= Rivière du Sud-Ouest =

Rivière du Sud-Ouest may refer to:

- Rivière du Sud-Ouest (Saint Lawrence River tributary), Quebec, Canada
- Rivière du Sud-Ouest (Yamaska River tributary), Quebec, Canada

== See also ==
- Rivière du Sud (disambiguation)
