= Laurentian Pilotage Authority =

- Company type: Crown corporation
- Industry: Maritime transport
- Headquarters: Montreal, Quebec, Canada
- Area served: All Canadian waters in and around the province of Quebec north of the Saint-Lambert Lock, excluding Chaleur Bay south of Cap d'Espoir
- Key people: Fulvio Fracassi (CEO)
- Services: Pilotage
- Revenue: ▲CA$105.902 million (2018)
- Net income: ▼CA$−0.609 million (2018)
- Owner: Government of Canada
- Number of employees: 49 (2018)
- Website: pilotagestlaurent.gc.ca

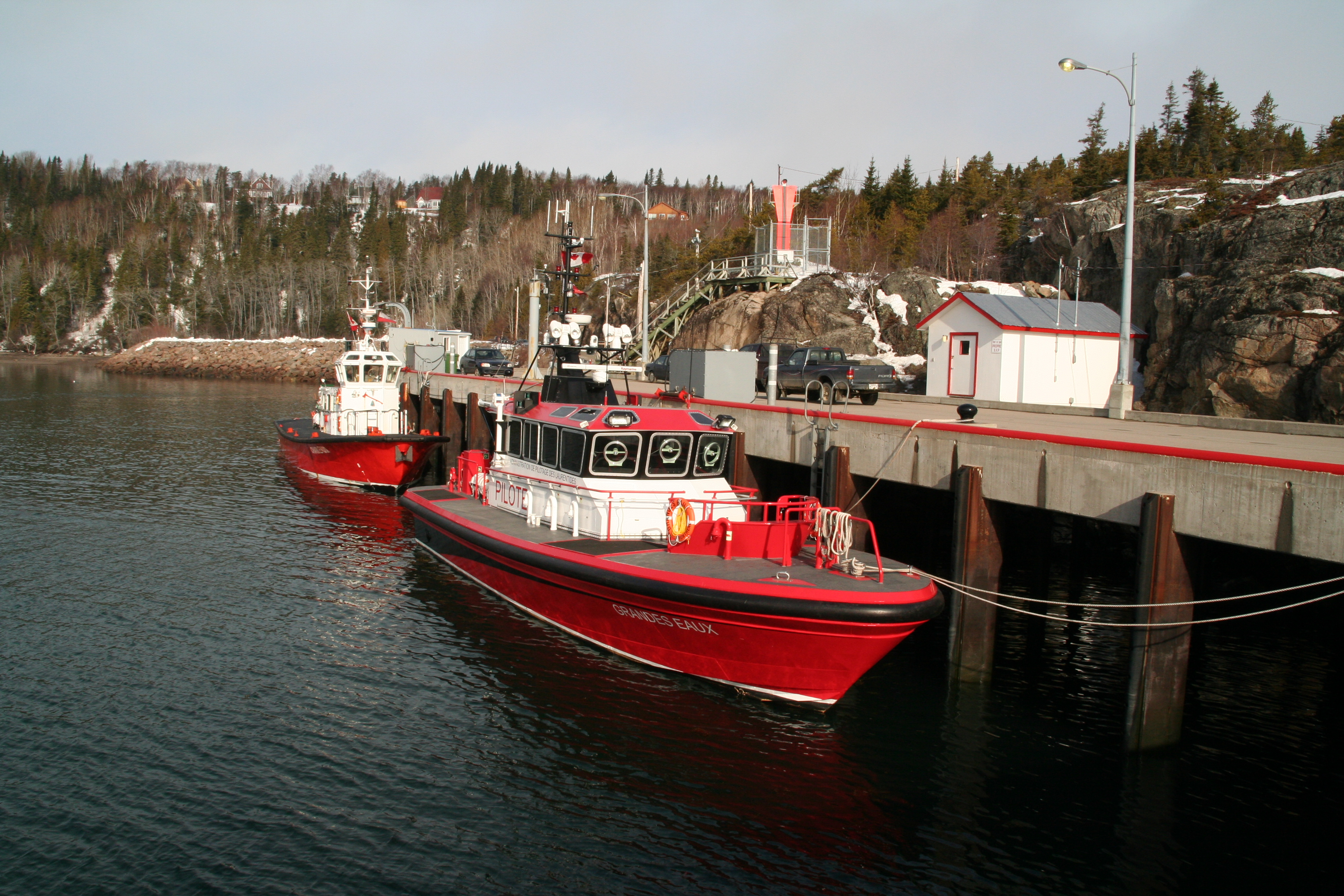
Grandes Eaux, pilot vessels Anse-aux-Basques, Les Escoumins, maritime estuary of St. Lawrence

The Laurentian Pilotage Authority (French: Administration de pilotage des Laurentides) is a Crown corporation of the Government of Canada, which was established as a result of recommendations made by the Royal Commission on Pilotage in Canada, by the Pilotage Act in February 1972. The corporation is responsible for pilotage through Canadian waters in Quebec north of the Saint-Lambert Lock, excluding Chaleur Bay south of Cap d'Espoir.
