= Rivière du Sud (La Sarre River tributary) =

Location
- Country: Canada
- Province: Quebec
- Region: Montérégie
- Regional County Municipality: Le Haut-Richelieu Regional County Municipality, Brome-Missisquoi Regional County Municipality et Rouville Regional County Municipality

Physical characteristics
- Source: Confluence of two forest streams
  - location: Farham
  - coordinates: 48.73304°N 79.11683°W
  - elevation: 290 m (950 ft)
- Mouth: La Sarre River
  - location: Saint-Césaire
  - coordinates: 48°48′20″N 78°49′32″W
  - elevation: 266 m (873 ft)
- Length: 26.4 km (16.4 mi)

Basin features
- Tributaries
  - left: (Upstream)
  - right: (Upstream) Perron stream, Bergeron stream, Christmas stream, Bordeleau stream, Chemin stream, Goulet stream, Morin stream.

The rivière du Sud (French pronunciation: [ʁivjɛʁ dy syd], "River of the South") is a tributary of the La Sarre River, flowing in the municipalities of Macamic and La Sarre, in the Abitibi-Ouest Regional County Municipality, in the administrative region of Abitibi-Témiscamingue, in Quebec, in Canada.

The Rivière du Sud flows mainly in agricultural areas and crosses some forest areas. Besides the lower part of this river (downtown La Sarre), agriculture is the main economic activity in this watershed; forestry, second.

The Rivière du Sud watershed is served by route 111 (east-west direction) and chemin des 6e et 7e rang Est (east-west direction).

Annually, the surface of the river is usually frozen from mid-November to mid-April, however the safe circulation on the ice is generally made from mid-December to the end of March. The water level of the river varies with the seasons and the precipitation.

== Geography ==
The South River rises at the confluence of two streams on the northeast side of the Fred Mountain, the summit of which reaches an altitude of 321 metres (1,053 ft). Located in a forest zone in Macamic, this source is located 3.8 kilometres (2.4 mi) south of the Canadian National railway; 9.0 kilometres (5.6 mi) south-east of the village center of La Sarre; and 8.7 kilometres (5.4 mi) south-east of the center of the village of Macamic.

The main neighboring watersheds are:

- north side: La Sarre river, Portage River, Méloizes River;
- east side: Macamic Lake, Hatherly Creek;
- south side: La Sarre river, Lièvre stream, Palmarolle River, Cachée River;
- west side: La Sarre River, Abitibi Lake, La Reine River, Méloizes River.

From its source, the South River flows over 26.4 kilometres (16.4 mi) according to the following segments:

- 3.8 kilometres (2.4 mi) to the west, then to the north by crossing Chemin Langlois twice, to Chemin du 2e and 3e rang Est (east-west direction);
- 8.6 kilometres (5.3 mi) towards the northeast by crossing the Canadian National Railway, then towards the northwest, up to route 111 (east-west direction);
- 7.2 kilometres (4.5 mi) towards the north-west, then towards the west, forming numerous small streamers up to the railway;
- 4.1 kilometres (2.5 mi) towards the northwest by winding and cutting the railway again, then entering the city center of La Sarre, up to the bridge of the route 393 (north-south direction);
- 2.7 kilometres (1.7 mi) north-west, then west, out of La Sarre town center, to its mouth.

The mouth of the South River is located at:

- 11.8 kilometres (7.3 mi) north-east of the mouth of the La Sarre river (confluence with Lake Abitibi);
- 17.3 kilometres (10.7 mi) west of the center of the village of Macamic;
- 21.7 kilometres (13.5 mi) east of the Ontario border;
- 69.5 kilometres (43.2 mi) northeast of the mouth of Lac Abitibi (in Ontario);
- 65.2 kilometres (40.5 mi) north-west of Rouyn-Noranda town center.

The mouth of the Rivière du Sud is located in a bend on the east bank of the La Sarre river. From there, the course of the La Sarre river descends south on 7.6 kilometres (4.7 mi) to drain onto the northeast shore of La Sarre bay in the Quebec part of Lake Abitibi. From there, the current crosses Lake Abitibi west on 83.4 kilometres (51.8 mi) to its mouth, bypassing five large peninsulas advancing north and several islands.

From the mouth of Lake Abitibi, the current flows along the Abitibi River, then the Moose River to discharge onto the south shore of the James Bay.

== Toponymy ==
This acronym is indicated in the Dictionary of Rivers and Lakes of the Province of Quebec of 1925.

The toponym Rivière du Sud was formalized on December 5, 1968 at the Commission de toponymie du Québec, that is, at the creation of this commission.

== Appendices ==
=== Related articles ===
- La Sarre River, a stream
- Lake Abitibi, a body of water
- Abitibi River, a stream
- Moose River, a stream
- Macamic, a municipality
- La Sarre, a city
- List of rivers of Quebec
