= Lake Macamic =

Lake in Quebec, Canada

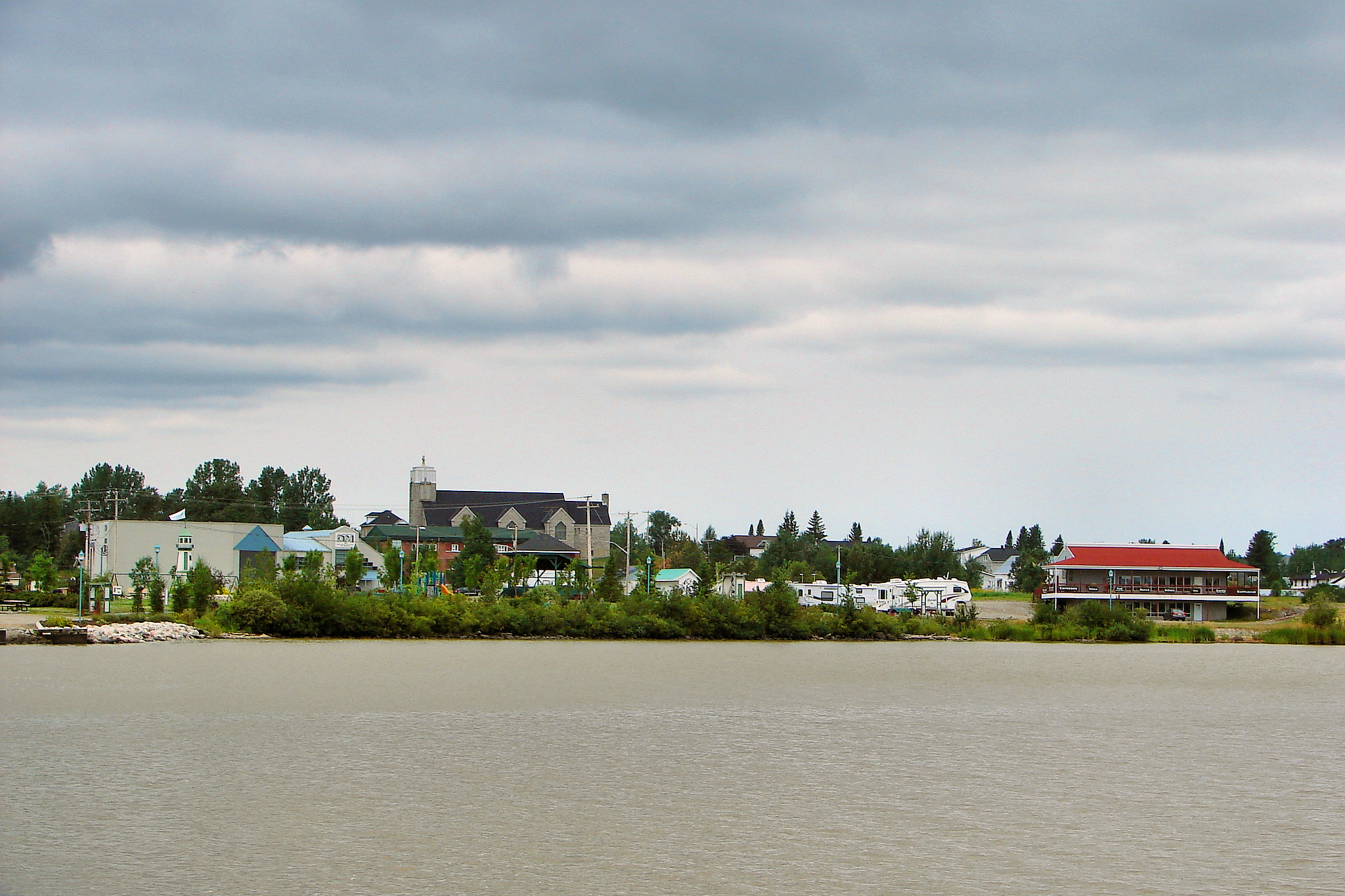
- Macamic village, seen from the lake

- Location within Quebec
- Location: Abitibi
- Coordinates: 48°47′56″N 78°57′55″W
- Lake type: Natural
- Primary inflows: Loïs River, Macamic River, Bellefeuille River (lake Macamic), Royal-Roussillon creek.
- Primary outflows: La Sarre River
- Basin countries: Canada
- Max. length: 9.8 km (9,800 m)
- Max. width: 9.7 km (9,700 m)
- Surface elevation: 278 m (912 ft)
- Islands: "À l'Épine", "À Fortin", "À Babineau", "À Croteau"

Macamic Lake (French pronunciation: [makamik]) is a freshwater body of the municipalities of Macamic, Authier-Nord and Chazel in the Regional County Municipality (MRC) of Abitibi-Ouest, in the administrative region of Abitibi-Témiscamingue, in Quebec, in Canada.

Lake Macamic is surrounded by a mainly agricultural area. The surface of this body of water is generally frozen from mid-November to the end of April; however, the period of safe ice traffic is usually from mid-December to the end of March.

The arrival of the Transcontinental Railway to Macamic in 1916 (passing south of Macamic Lake) and La Sarre, Quebec in 1917 contributed greatly to the colonization of this area. Pioneers of lots awarded in the area usually arrived by train from the Mauricie or the Capitale-Nationale region. For example, the pioneers were getting off the train at Macamic, south of Macamic Lake, with their livestock, settlements and provisions. Then, they used boats to cross Macamic Lake and take the La Sarre River to their respective lot in the area of Chazel. These pioneers were generally supplied by the train by their extended family who lived in Mauricie.

== Geography ==
Lake Macamic is supplied with water by:

- East side (Bellefeuille Bay): Macamic River, Little Bellefeuille River, Royal-Roussillon Creek;
- East side (Perron Bay): a small unnamed river;
- South side: Lois River which flows to the village of Macamic.

On the north side of the lake, the lakes "De Courval" and "Piton" are surrounded by marsh areas that drain into the La Sarre River. The mouth of Lake Macamic is located at the bottom of a bay on the north side. Its outfall is the La Sarre River which runs 3.3 km to the northwest, 22 kilometres (14 mi) to the west, then 23 kilometres (14 mi) to the south to flow into the La Sarre Bay, of Abitibi Lake.

== Toponymy ==
The geographer Hormisdas Magnan attests that the name "Macamic" is of Algonquin origin meaning "amazing ". Other historians attribute to it rather the meaning of "lame beaver" to this name; the component "mak" means "disabled" and "amik" is associated with "beaver". The graph "Makamik" has long been in use.

The toponym "Macamic Lake" was formalized on December 5, 1968, at the Bank of Place Names of the Commission de toponymie du Québec.

== See also ==
- Macamic, a municipality
- Authier-Nord, a municipality
- Chazel, Quebec, a municipality
- La Sarre River, a watercourse
- Loïs River, a watercourse
- Macamic River, a watercourse
- Bellefeuille River (Macamic Lake), a watercourse
- Abitibi-Ouest, a Regional County Municipality (RCM)
