= Rivière du Sud =

Rivière du Sud (French pronunciation: [ʁivjɛʁ dy syd], "River of the South") may refer to:

== Canada ==
- Rivière du Sud (Montmagny), a tributary of the south shore of the Saint Lawrence River in Montmagny Regional County Municipality, Chaudière-Appalaches, Quebec
- Rivière du Sud (Richelieu River tributary) in Le Haut-Richelieu Regional County Municipality, Montérégie, Quebec
- Rivière du Sud (La Sarre River tributary), in Abitibi-Ouest Regional County Municipality, Abitibi-Témiscamingue, Quebec

== See also ==
- Rivière du Sud-Ouest (disambiguation)
