= Clerval =

Clerval may refer to:

== Places ==
- Clerval, Doubs, France
- Clerval, Quebec, Canada

== People and fictional characters ==
- Henry Clerval, a character in Frankenstein
