= Pont de l'Île =

Covered bridge in Quebec, Canada

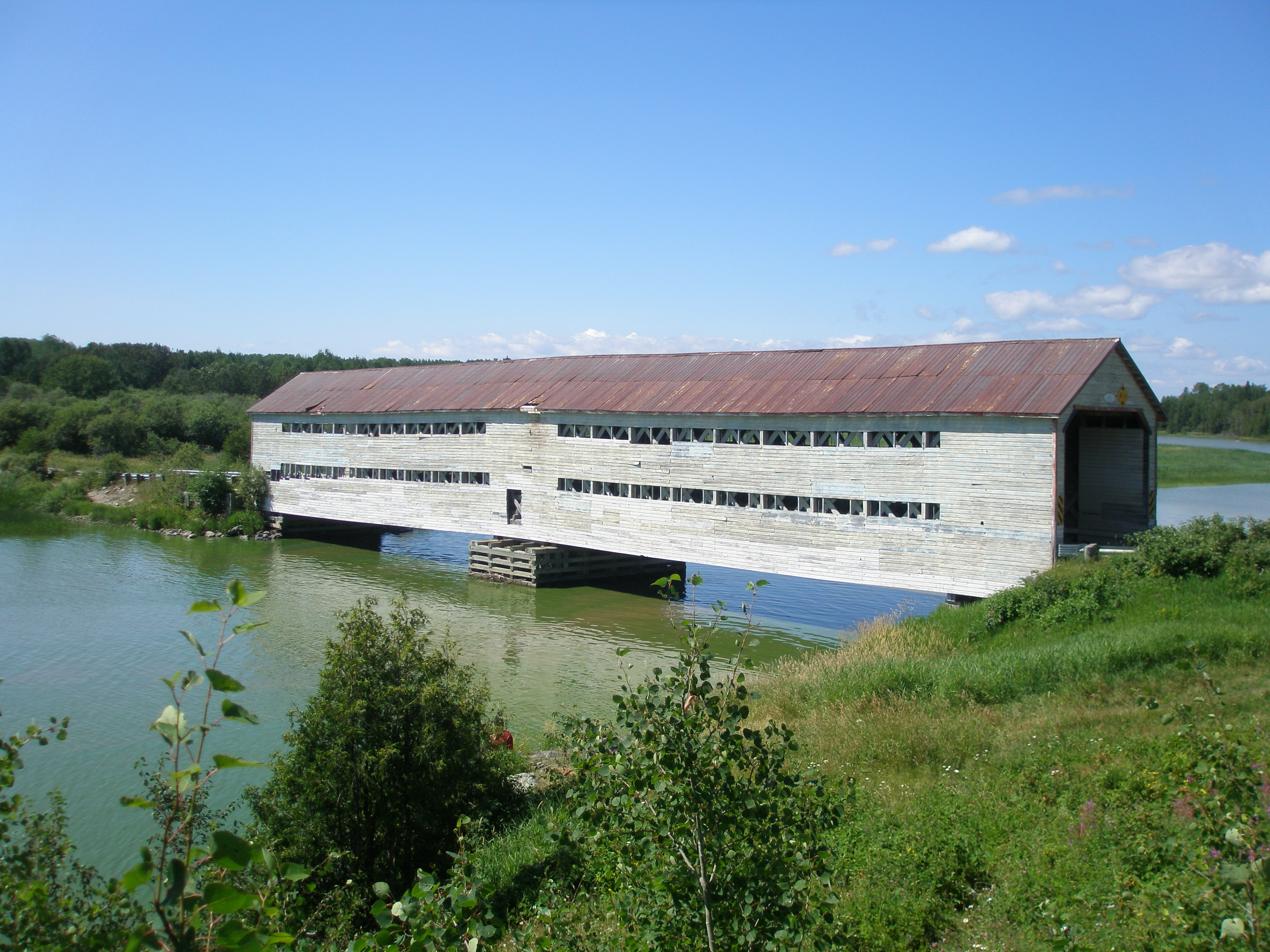
- Coordinates: 48.691667°N 79.4075°W
- Carries: Road Bridge
- Crosses: Lake Abitibi
- Locale: Clerval, Quebec, Canada

Characteristics
- Design: Town lattice
- Material: Wood
- Total length: 52m
- Clearance above: 4.10m

History
- Opened: 1946

The pont de l'Île is a covered bridge near the municipality of Clerval, Quebec, Canada. It connects an island, L'Île-Nepawa, in Lake Abitibi to the mainland.

The single-lane bridge is of Lattice truss bridge design. This design was modified by the Quebec Ministry of Colonisation and was used for more than 500 covered bridges in Quebec. Thirty-four covered bridges were built in Abitibi, during the colonisation of the region. Today fewer than half of them are extant.

Built in 1946, a metal pillar was added in 1997. In 2012 the bridge was restored, including a new roof, new woodwork, and it was painted red, having been beige.

The weight capacity is 12 tonnes. It does not benefit from any provincial or municipal protection.

== See also ==
- List of covered bridges in Quebec
