= Estuary of St. Lawrence =

Body of water at the mouth of the St. Lawrence river, in Quebec, Canada

St. Lawrence River Estuary Estuaire du Saint-Laurent (in French)
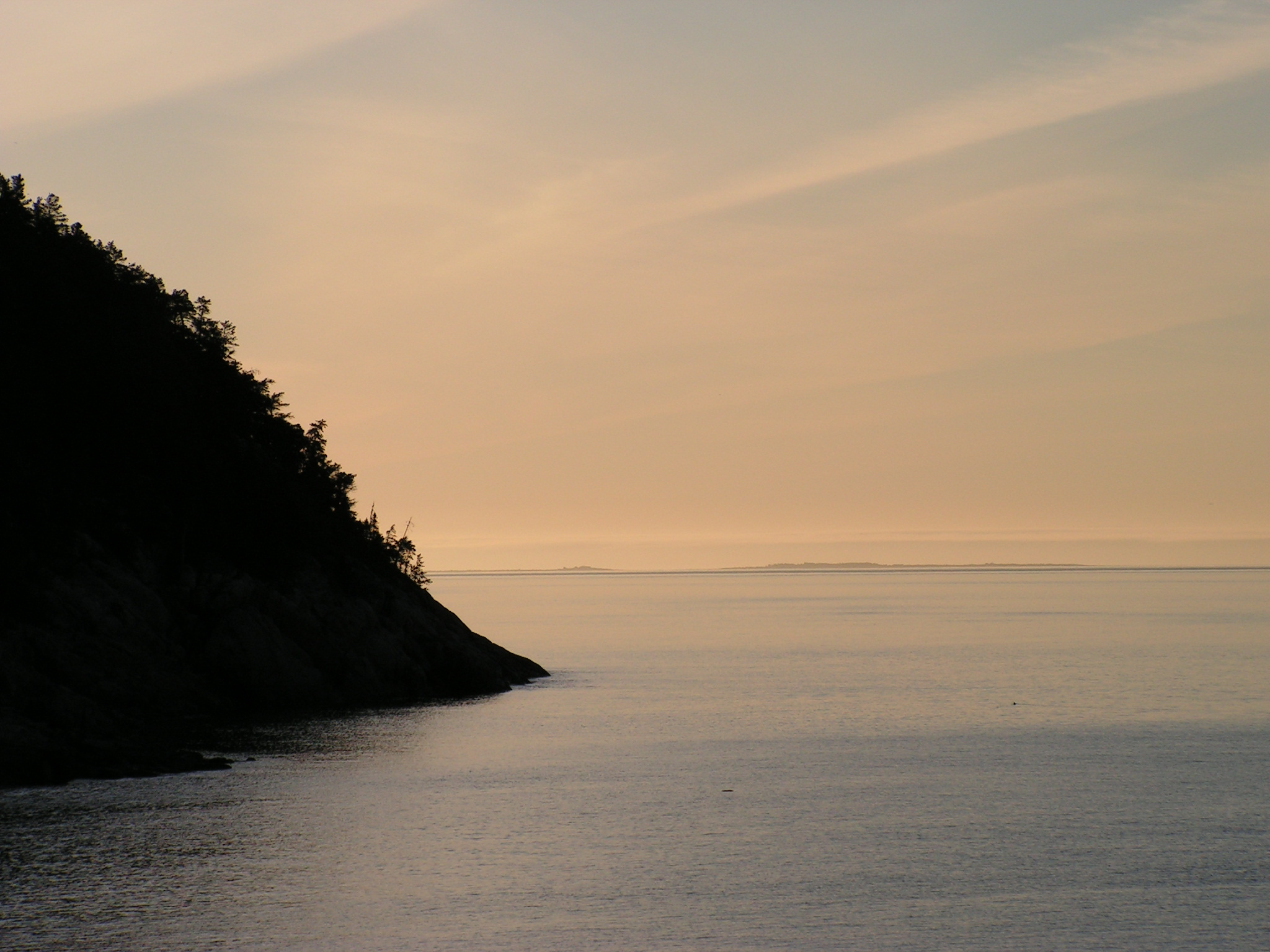
- Maritime section at Port-au-Saumon

- Location within Quebec Location within Canada
- Etymology: Saint Lawrence of Rome

Location
- Country: Canada
- Province: Quebec

Physical characteristics
- Source: Saint Lawrence River
  - location: Lake Saint-Pierre, Trois-Rivières
  - coordinates: 46°16′17″N 72°38′5″W
- Mouth: Gulf of St. Lawrence / Atlantic Ocean
  - location: Pointe des Monts
  - coordinates: 49°19′N 67°23′W
  - elevation: 0 m (0 ft)
- Discharge
  - location: below the Saint Lawrence River

The St. Lawrence River Estuary is an estuary at the mouth of the St. Lawrence River. It stretches 655 km from west to east, from the outlet of Lake Saint Pierre to Pointe-des-Monts, where it becomes the Gulf of St. Lawrence, in Quebec, Canada.

The estuary is divided into 3 parts: the fluvial estuary, the middle estuary and the maritime estuary. The waters coming from the north shore of the St. Lawrence and Labrador come mainly from the Canadian Shield.

Among the deepest and largest estuaries in the world, the St. Lawrence maritime estuary extends nearly 250 km before it widens at Pointe-des-Monts into the Gulf of St. Lawrence. This enclosed sea is connected to the Atlantic Ocean by Cabot Strait and the Strait of Belle-Isle.

== Navigation ==
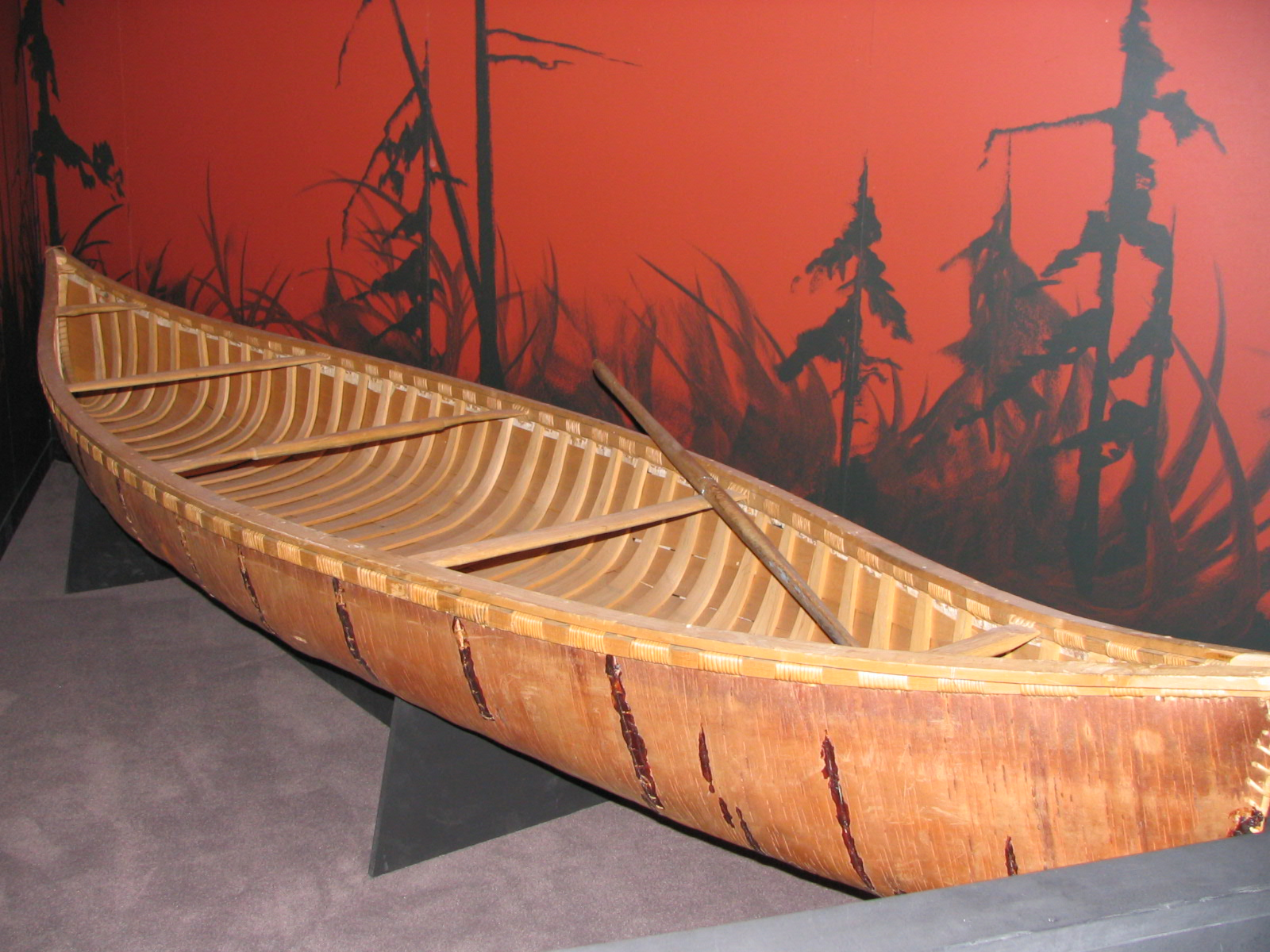
Birch bark canoe, Ilnu Museum in Mashteuiatsh, Saguenay–Lac-Saint-Jean

The culture of the First Nations in Canada was largely based on birch, and the birch bark canoe provided these hunting peoples with the mobility essential to this way of life.

After crossing the Gulf of St. Lawrence, the itinerary of the first Europeans (whalers, fishermen, explorers and navigators) enters the waters of the Estuary, where the most difficult manoeuvres of the voyage begin: reefs, shoals, diagonal currents, fog and the presence of shallow channels, often narrow and winding, not to mention winter and ice and its unpredictable and fearsome storms. Throughout its history, the estuary of St. Lawrence River is not easily domesticated.

=== St. Lawrence Pilots ===
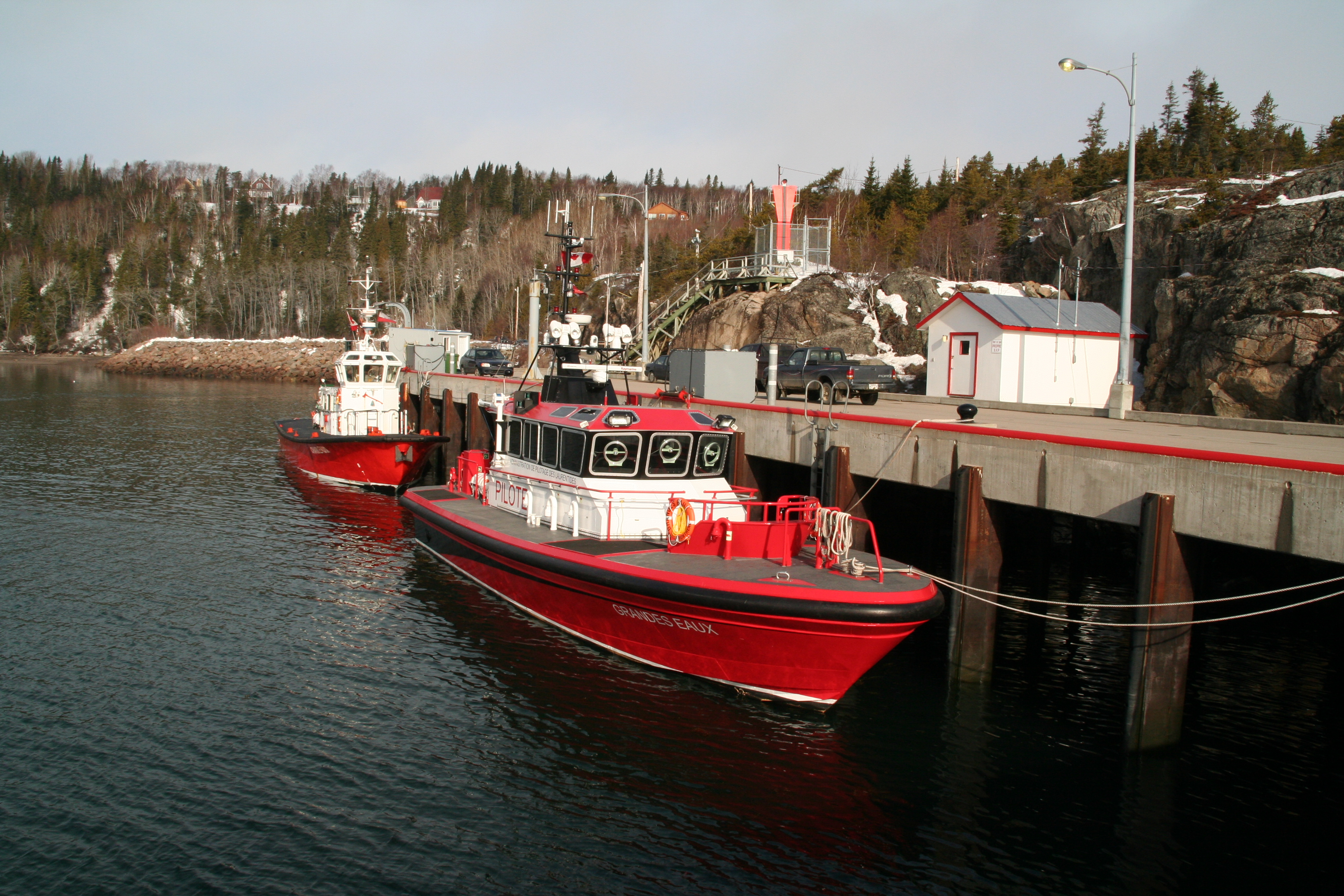
Grandes Eaux, pilot vessels at their homeport, Anse aux Basques, Les Escoumins

From Les Escoumins to the Great Lakes, St. Lawrence maritime pilots experts in navigating specific sectors of the River ensure the safe efficient passage of the vessels under their care.

== Fluvial estuary ==
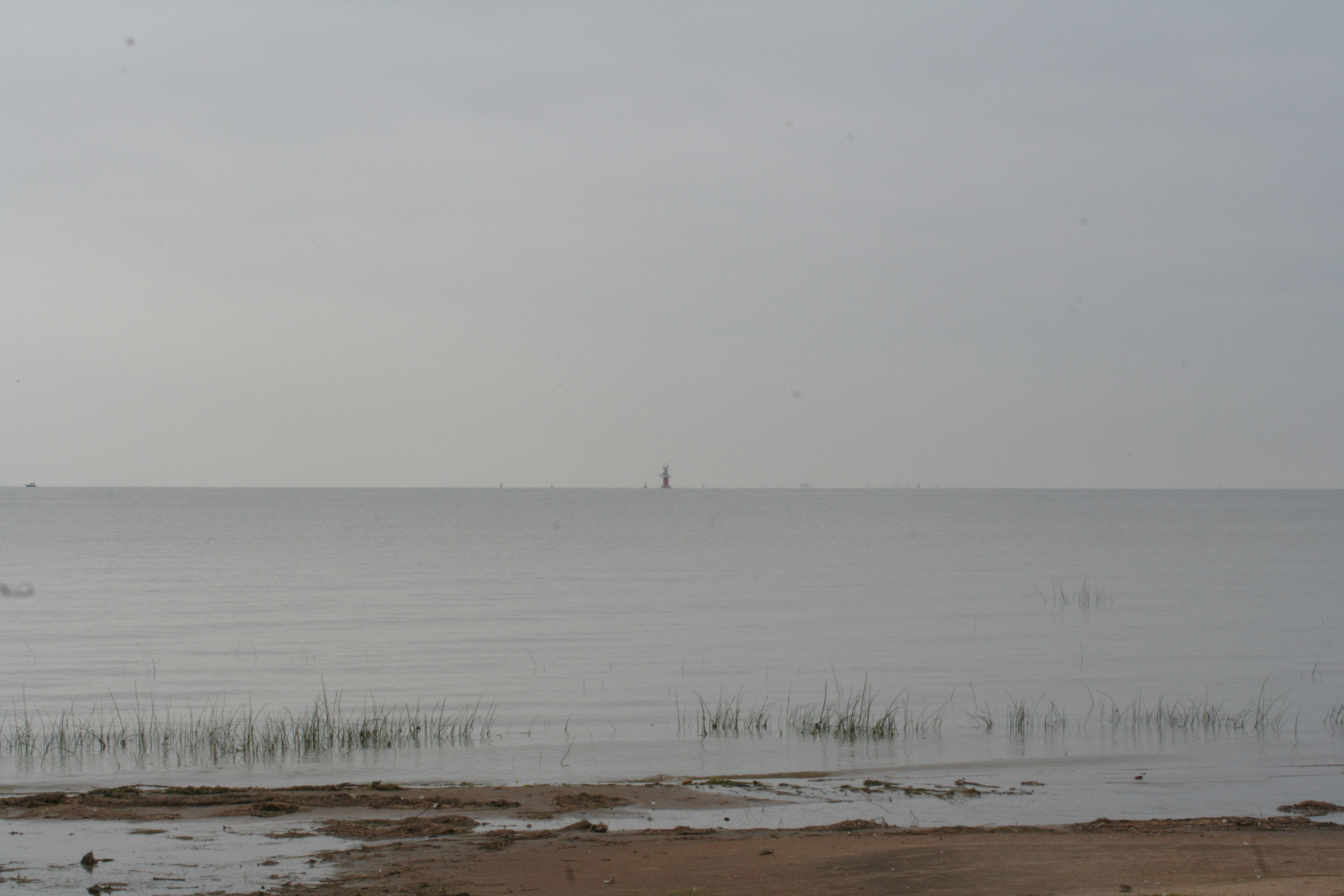
Lake Saint-Pierre, lighthouse, shoreline, Pointe-du-Lac

Running for about 160 km, the fluvial estuary or estuarine section of the river extends from the outlet of lake Saint-Pierre to the RCM L'Islet; the portion of the river under the power of freshwater tides.

The average depth of the main channel varies from 13 to 40 m, with pools of 21 m in Trois-Rivières-Ouest and 60 m in Quebec City.

Starting with lake Saint-Pierre, the ecological conditions of the St. Lawrence underwent a radical change. The slow and continuous advance of the great mass of fresh water gradually gives way to the regime of the upflow tide, where twice every twenty-four hours the shores undergo a short alternation of emersion and immersion.

The waters of the streams and rivers that flow into the river differ from those of the St. Lawrence in terms of temperature, chemical composition and suspended solids. The main rivers of the fluvial estuary, on the south shore, are the Bécancour, Chaudière, Rivière du Sud rivers, on the north shore: St. Maurice Champlain, Batiscan, Sainte-Anne, Jacques-Cartier, Saint-Charles, Montmorency rivers and several secondary watercourses.

The waters retain their distinctiveness over a relatively long course before mixing. Those in the Rivière des Outaouais keep their properties up to 25 km downstream from the mouth of the Saint-Maurice. Downstream of Grondines, the currents of the rising tide (flood) reverse the direction of the river's flow. The result is an increasingly homogeneous stirring and mixing of fresh water from different sources.

=== Flora ===
Extending along seven kilometres of shoreline in the St. Lawrence River's fluvial estuary, the Grondines and Sainte-Anne-de-la-Pérade swamp is one of the last, large, treed swamps on the river.

Between Saint-Augustin-de-Desmaures and Île aux Grues, from 2008 to 2012, three plants characteristic of the St. Lawrence freshwater estuary and in a precarious situation were monitored annually: Victorin's gentian (Gentianopsis virgata ssp. victorinii), Victorin's water-hemlock (Cicuta maculata var. victorinii) and Parker's Buckwheat (Eriocaulon parkeri).

== Middle estuary ==
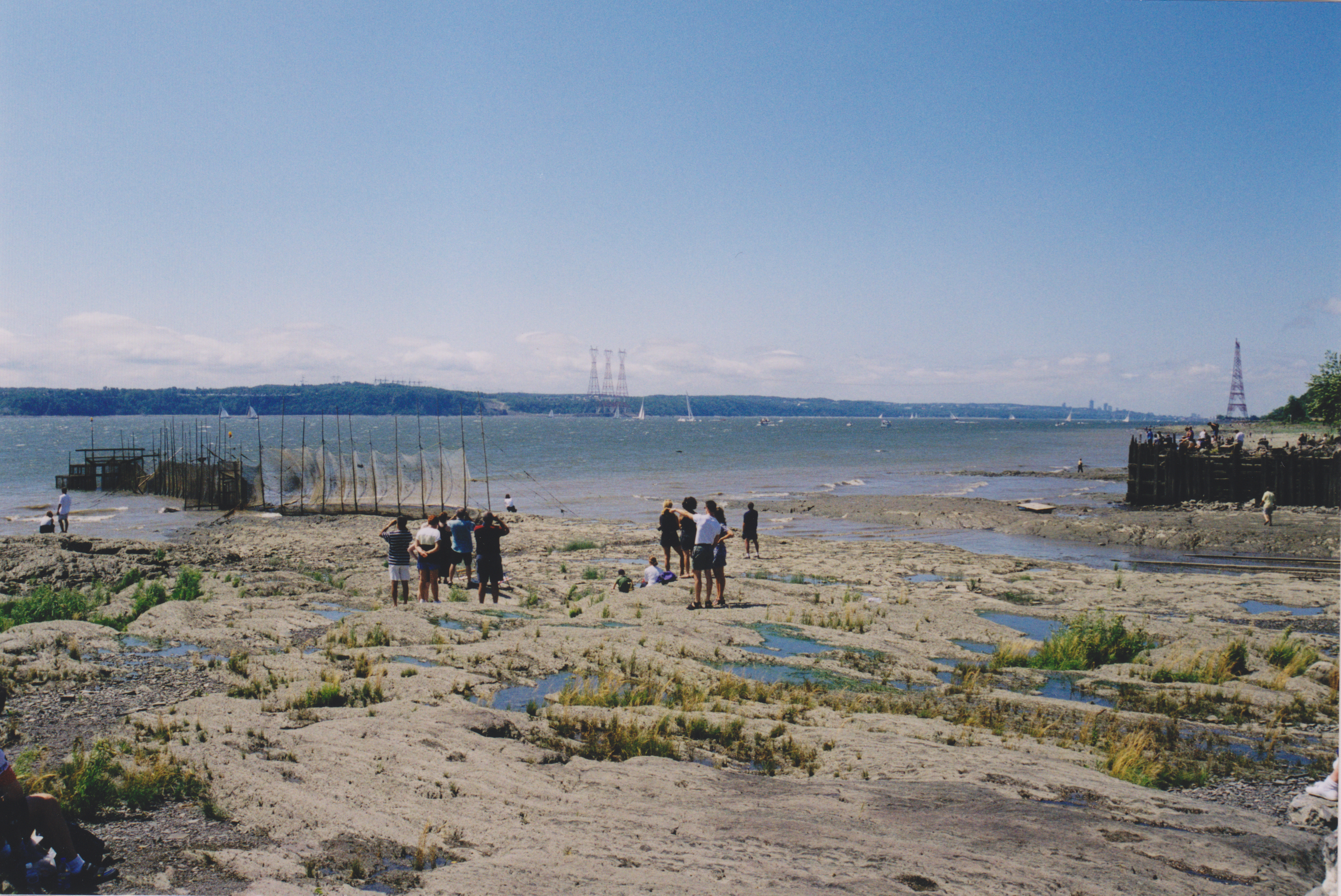
Passage of couriers from Transat Quebec Saint-Malo, Saint-Laurent-de-l'Île-d'Orléans 2000

Running for about 195 km, the middle estuary of the St. Lawrence extends, according to the authors, from the eastern tip of Île d'Orléans or Saint-Jean-Port-Joli, to the mouth of the Saguenay River. This estuary section widens rapidly from a few kilometres to 10 km, then to 20 km upstream of Île aux Coudres and the archipelago of L'Isle-aux-Grues.

The middle estuary is mainly characterized by the mixing of freshwater-influenced waters with salt water and high turbidity (turbid water). The hydrodynamic conditions, mainly the reversal of tidal currents and the increase in the salinity gradient, are such that a large amount of suspended solids is trapped and forms a muddy plug (turbidity zone). At ebb tide, the average water flow reaches 90,000 m3/s (fresh and salt water) in Montmagny.

=== Geomorphology ===
Over the millennia, several geomorphological events have shaped the landscape of the territory on the south shore of the middle estuary.

The tectonic movements responsible for the genesis of the Appalachian Mountains explain the nature and configuration of the bedrock. Ice and interglacial periods led to glaciations, melts, and marine invasions, ice movements level the Appalachian Mountains. The large layers of sediment in the territory are the legacy of tectonic movements combined with glacial and interglacial periods.

== Maritime estuary ==
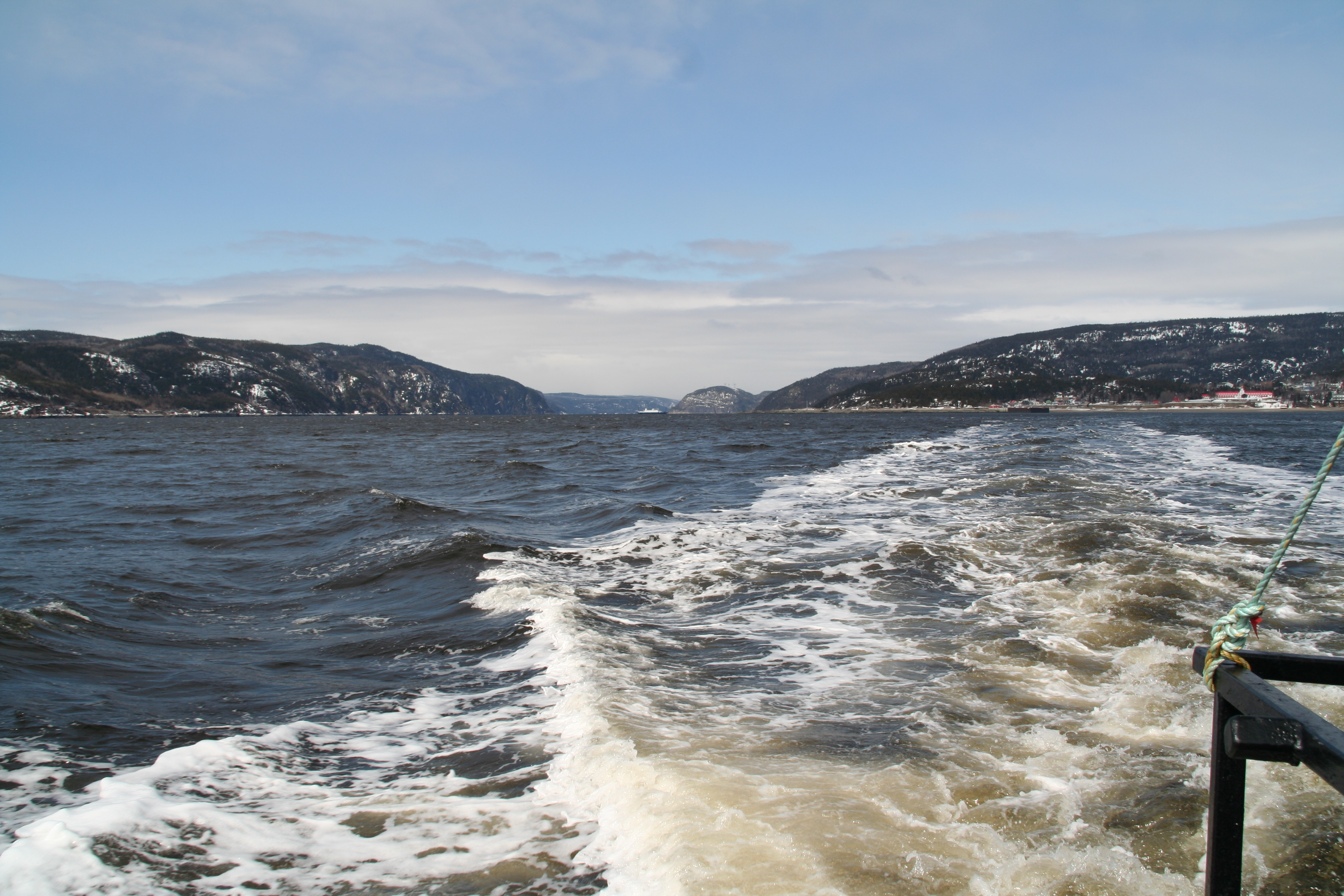
Saguenay–St. Lawrence Marine Park, Maritime estuary of St. Lawrence River, Tadoussac

Among the deepest and largest estuaries in the world, running for about 300 km, the maritime Estuary of the St. Lawrence extends from the mouth of Saguenay River at Tadoussac to Pointe-des-Monts where the Gulf begins.

=== The Whale Route ===
Along the shore, the Whale Route (Route 138), stretches from Tadoussac to Labrador. There, the two bodies of water that mix off the coast of Tadoussac give the Maritime Estuary characteristics that distinguish it from other reaches of the St. Lawrence. Nutrient-rich surface waters throughout the summer and upwellings of deep, cold water that favour the formation of krill (euphausiids). Those organisms rise towards the surface near the shore, providing vast food stores for Baleen whales, and many others variety of whales and seals. It is home to the southernmost Beluga whale population in the world.

This section is connected to the Gulf of St. Lawrence, an enclosed sea leading to the Atlantic Ocean by Cabot Strait and the Strait of Belle-Isle.

== Fauna and flora ==
=== Habitats ===
The zone of contact between fresh and salt water corresponds to a region of high concentrations of suspended matter causing a zone of maximum turbidity (MTZ) of a length that can vary from 70 to 120 kilometres (43 to 75 mi), depending on the flow of the river. This zone of maximum turbidity is located between Île d'Orléans (salinity greater than 0 PSU) and Île aux Coudres (salinity below 10 PSU). The mechanisms of estuarine circulation associated with this environment make it a privileged site of primary and secondary production which shelters many fish nurseries. High environmental turbidity provides shelter against predators while larvae are maintained under optimum temperature and salinity conditions. Large variations in salinity and turbidity result in a wide variety of physicochemical conditions and planktonic communities on the river.

An emblematic species is the beluga (beluga whale), but many other species are present. An identification guide for marine fishes of the estuary and northern Gulf of St. Lawrence was completed in 2008.
