= Abitibi-De-Troyes Provincial Park =

Provincial park in Northern Ontario, Canada

- IUCN category III (natural monument or feature)
- Location within Ontario
- Interactive map of Abitibi-De-Troyes Provincial Park
- Location: Cochrane District, Ontario, Canada
- Nearest town: Iroquois Falls
- Coordinates: 48°45′07″N 80°02′44″W
- Area: 4,340 ha (16.8 sq mi)
- Designation: Cultural Heritage
- Established: 1985
- Named for: Pierre de Troyes
- Governing body: Ontario Parks
- Website: www.ontarioparks.com/park/abitibidetroyes

Abitibi-De-Troyes Provincial Park is in Cochrane District of Northern Ontario, Canada. It was established in 1985 and provides backcountry canoeing, camping, hunting, fishing and nature viewing activities. The park is named after Pierre de Troyes who may have portaged across Long Point during his Hudson Bay expedition in 1686.

It is a non-operating park, meaning that there are no facilities or services, and is only accessible via air or water.

== Extent ==
Abitibi-De-Troyes Provincial Park protects Long Point Peninsula – a 12-kilometre-long (7.5 mi) peninsula extending into Lake Abitibi – and a small section of the Abitibi River from the lake's outlet to Couchching Falls, as well as the lake's southern shore between the peninsula and outlet.

This park was reconfigured and reclassified in April 2005. It was formerly a waterway-class park and included the public lands along the Abitibi River all the way to Iroquois Falls. Most of these lands were deregulated because they were interspersed with significant amounts of private land that complicated park management. The islands in Lake Abitibi were also formerly part of this park but were transferred to Lake Abitibi Islands Provincial Park when it was created in 2005. The park's classification was then changed to historical-class park.

== Features ==
Notable features of the park include coniferous forest, swamps, eskers, kettle basins, and waterfowl nesting areas. It contains 14 documented archaeological sites on Long Point and at the lake's outlet at the Abitibi River. The Long Point peninsula also has two sites of historic significance. One site is the portage trail that was likely used by indigenous people and fur traders, as well as by de Troyes' expedition to Hudson Bay in 1686. The other site is that of "The Lonely Tombstone", which marks the grave of a voyageur who shot himself while taking his gun out of his canoe in 1865.

== Flora ==
In mesic habitats, the dominant trees are coniferous species, such as balsam fir, white spruce, white cedar, and sporadically black spruce.

Wet sites are characterized by black spruce and white cedar, mixed at times with upland species such as white birch, white spruce, and balsam fir. Trembling aspen and mixedwood stands with predominantly birch can be found along the banks of the Abitibi River and shores of Lake Abitibi, as well as in the central portion of Long Point Peninsula.

The drier locations, such as crests of eskers, old beach ridges, and high bluffs, are marked by intolerant hardwood and occasional pine stands, with red pine, jack pine, and very rarely, white pine present in small isolated patches.
