= Saint-Simon-de-Rimouski =

- Municipality
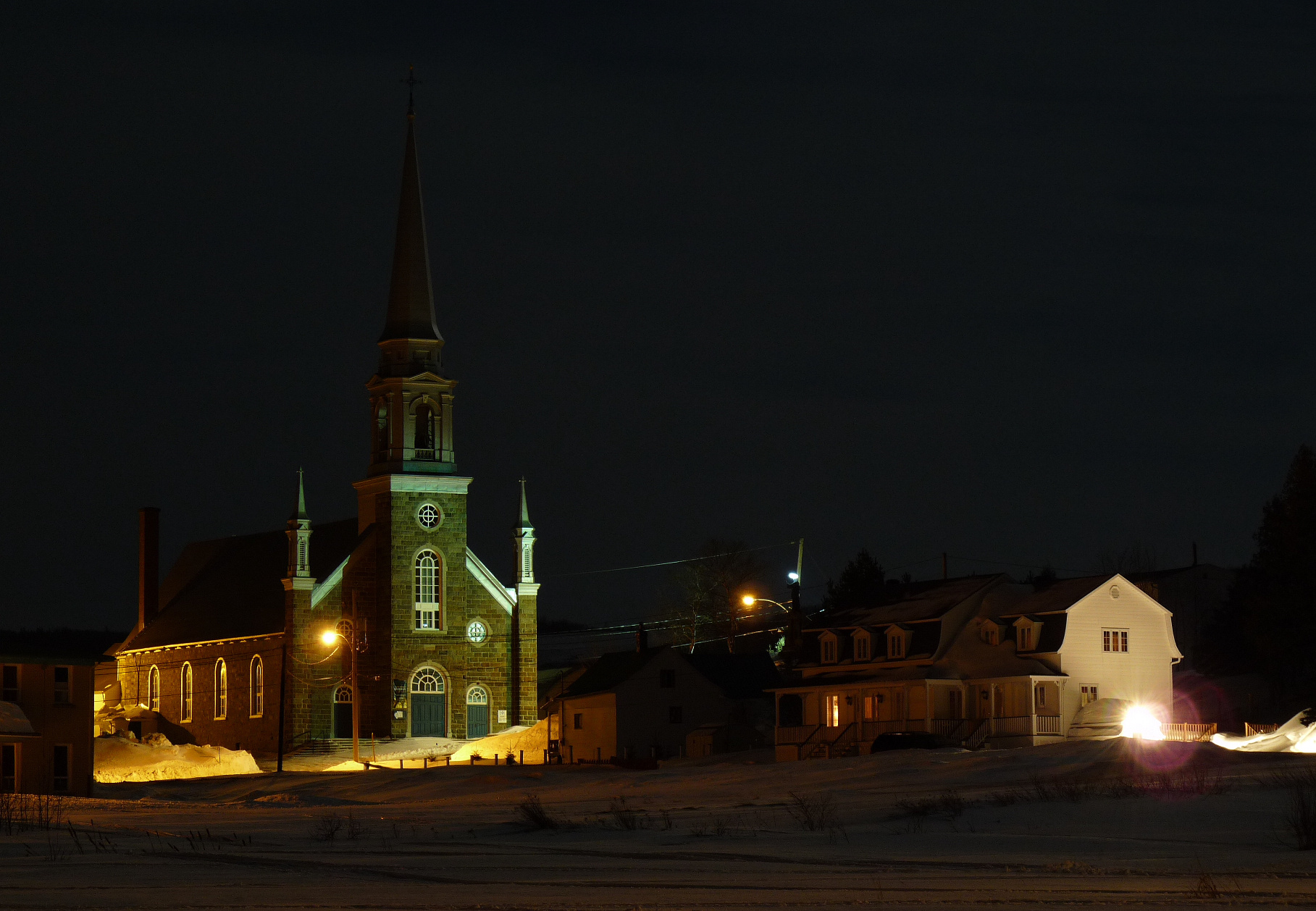

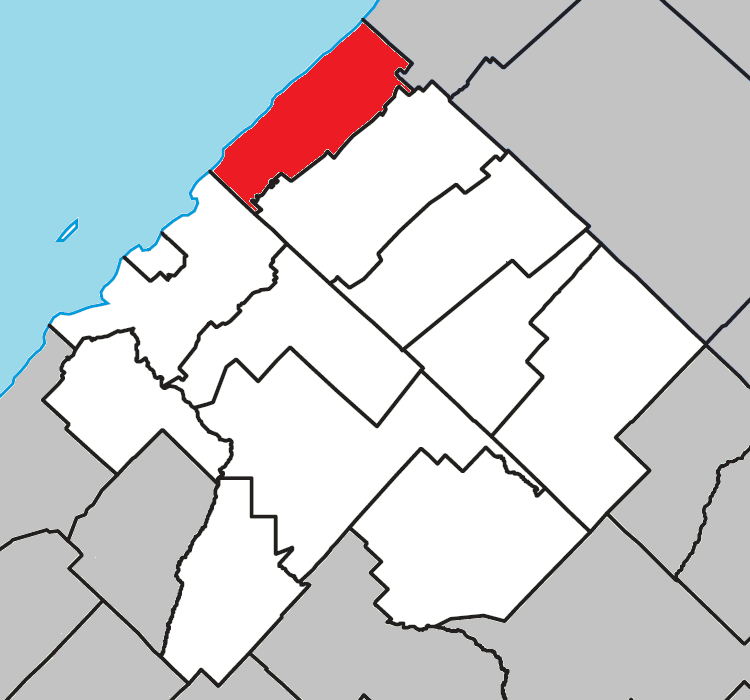
- Location within Les Basques RCM

- Location in eastern Quebec
- Coordinates: 48.2°N 69.05°W
- Country: Canada
- Province: Quebec
- Region: Bas-Saint-Laurent
- RCM: Les Basques
- Constituted: July 1, 1855

Government
  - Mayor: Francis Beaulieu
  - Federal riding: Rimouski-Neigette—Mitis—Matapédia—Les Basques
  - Prov. riding: Rivière-du-Loup–Témiscouata–Les Basques

Area
  - Total: 74.30 km^{2} (28.69 sq mi)
  - Land: 74.84 km^{2} (28.90 sq mi)
- There is an apparent contradiction between two authoritative sources

Population (2021)
  - Total: 455
  - Density: 6.1/km^{2} (16/sq mi)
  - Pop 2016-2021: ▲6.8%
  - Dwellings: 333
- Time zone: UTC−5 (EST)
  - Summer (DST): UTC−4 (EDT)
- Postal code(s): G0L 4C0
- Area codes: 418 and 581
- Highways: R-132
- Website: www.st-simon.qc.ca

Saint-Simon-de-Rimouski (French pronunciation: [sɛ̃ simɔ̃ də ʁimuski]) is a municipality in the Les Basques Regional County Municipality in the Bas-Saint-Laurent region of Quebec, Canada. Its population in the Canada 2021 Census was 455. Before 2020 it was known as Saint-Simon.

== History ==
The first settler in the area was Régis Jean, originally from Port-Joli, who settled there in 1796. In 1823, the christian parish of Saint-Simon was founded. Until 1827, it was served by the parish priests of Trois-Pistoles. It received its first resident parish priest in 1827. On 10 December 1828, the parish was canonically established. It was civilly established on 12 February 1835. Its parish registers were opened in 1836. Abbé Germain Siméon Marceau was the first parish priest of Saint-Simon from 1838 to 1872. The present church is the parish’s first church and is the oldest church in the Archdiocese of Rimouski.

In 1855, the municipality of Saint-Simon-de-la-Baie-Ha! Ha! was officially founded. In 1865, the municipality of Saint-Mathieu-de-Rioux was established by separating away from Saint-Simon-de-la-Baie-Ha! Ha!. During the early 20th century, the name of the municipality was shortened to become simply Saint-Simon.

On 21 March 2020, the parish municipality of Saint-Simon changed its name to ‘Saint-Simon-de-Rimouski’ and changed its status to that of a regular municipality.

== Demographics ==
=== Population ===
Canada census – Saint-Simon-de-Rimouski community profile

	2021	2016	2011
Population	455 (+6.8% from 2016)	426 (-2.7% from 2011)	438 (+0.2% from 2006)
Land area	74.84 km^{2} (28.90 sq mi)	75.01 km^{2} (28.96 sq mi)	75.07 km^{2} (28.98 sq mi)
Population density	6.1/km^{2} (16/sq mi)	5.7/km^{2} (15/sq mi)	5.8/km^{2} (15/sq mi)
Median age	60.8 (M: 60.4, F: 61.2)	57.6 (M: 57.8, F: 57.4)	54.1 (M: 53.9, F: 54.3)
Private dwellings	333 (total)	330 (total)	332 (total)
Median household income	$57,200	$45,056	$41,466

References: 2021 2016 2011

Historical Census Data - Saint-Simon-de-Rimouski, Quebec
Year	Pop.	±%
1861	1,951	—
1871	1,186	−39.2%
1881	1,266	+6.7%
1891	998	−21.2%
1901	798	−20.0%
1911	766	−4.0%
1921	805	+5.1%
1931	905	+12.4%
1941	911	+0.7%
1951	905	−0.7%
1956	880	−2.8%
1961	888	+0.9%
1966	906	+2.0%
1971	763	−15.8%
1976	675	−11.5%
1981	602	−10.8%
1986	502	−16.6%
1991	491	−2.2%
1996	504	+2.6%
2001	451	−10.5%
2006	437	−3.1%
2011	438	+0.2%
2016	426	−2.7%
2021	455	+6.8%

=== Language ===
Canada Census Mother Tongue - Saint-Simon-de-Rimouski, Quebec
Census	Total	French			English			French & English			Other		
Year	Responses	Count	Trend	Pop %	Count	Trend	Pop %	Count	Trend	Pop %	Count	Trend	Pop %
2021	455	450	▲7.1%	98.9%	5	0.0%	1.1%	5	▲ n/a%	1.1%	0	0.0%	0.0%
2016	425	420	▼3.4%	98.8%	5	0.0%	1.2%	0	0.0%	0.0%	0	0.0%	0.0%
2011	440	435	▲4.6%	98.9%	5	▲ n/a%	1.1%	0	0.0%	0.0%	0	▼100.0%	0.0%
2006	435	415	▼6.7%	95.4%	0	0.0%	0.0%	0	0.0%	0.0%	20	▲ n/a%	4.6%
2001	0	445	▼11.9%	100.0%	0	0.0%	0.0%	0	0.0%	0.0%	0	0.0%	0.0%
1996	505	505	n/a	100.0%	0	n/a	0.0%	0	n/a	0.0%	0	n/a	0.0%

== See also ==
- List of municipalities in Quebec
