= Les Escoumins =

- Municipality
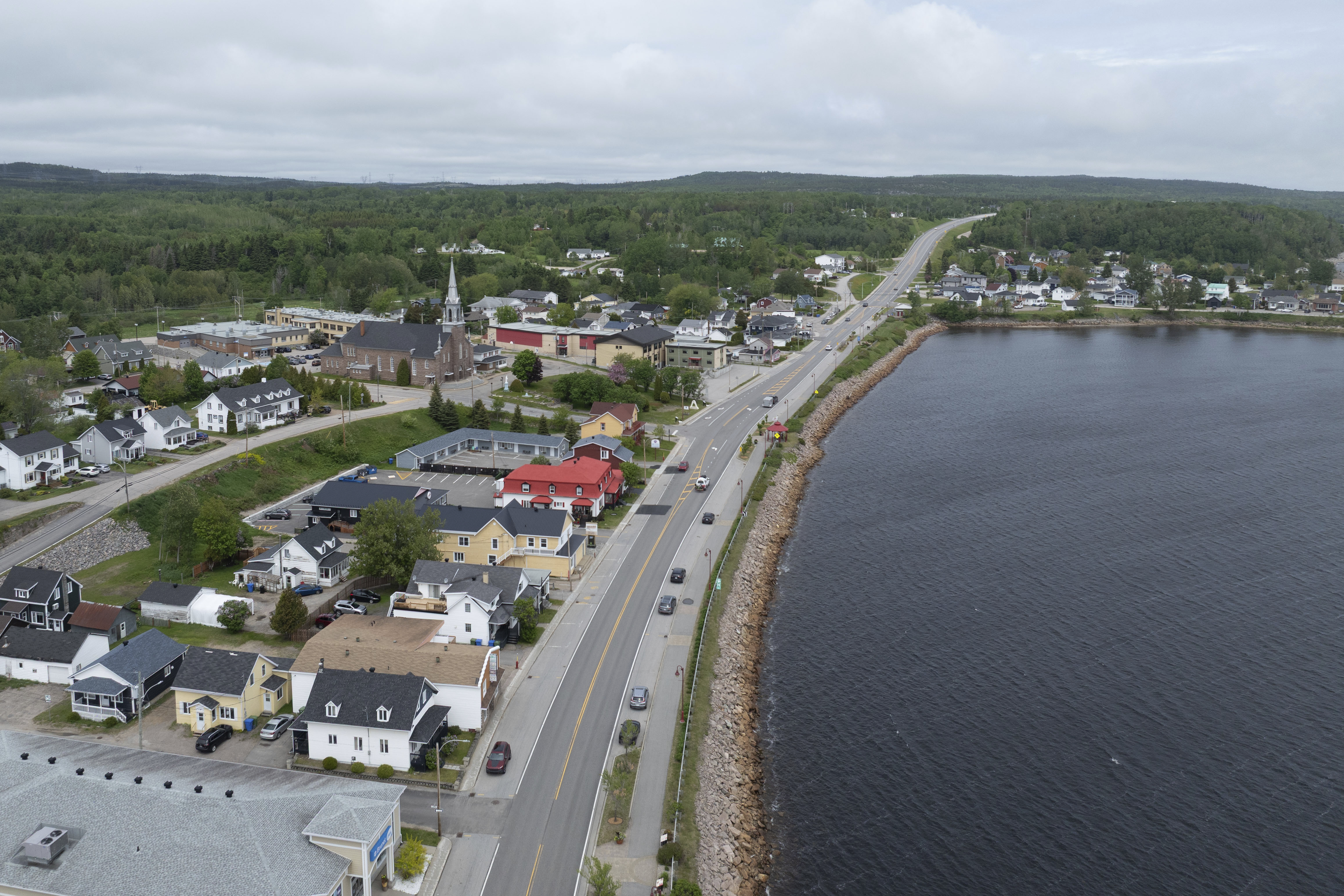
- Les Escoumins in 2026

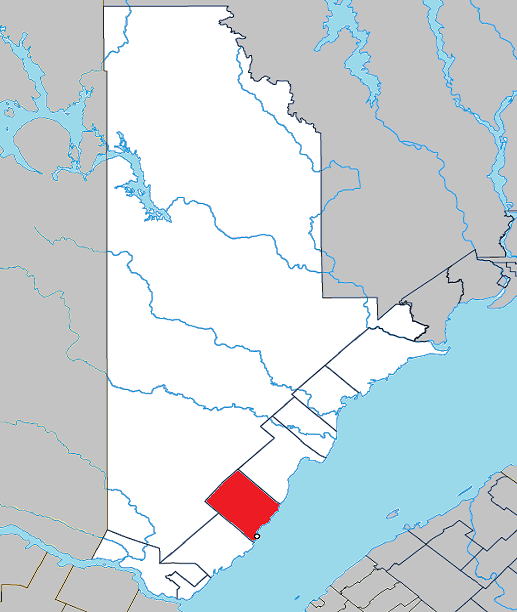
- Location within La Haute-Côte-Nord RCM

- Location in Côte-Nord region of Quebec
- Coordinates: 48°21′05″N 69°24′27″W
- Country: Canada
- Province: Quebec
- Region: Côte-Nord
- RCM: La Haute-Côte-Nord
- Settled: 1825
- Constituted: 5 May 1863

Government
  - Mayor: André Desrosiers
  - Federal riding: Côte-Nord—Kawawachikamach—Nitassinan
  - Prov. riding: René-Lévesque

Area
  - Municipality: 284.79 km^{2} (109.96 sq mi)
  - Land: 265.89 km^{2} (102.66 sq mi)
  - Urban: 1.61 km^{2} (0.62 sq mi)

Population (2021)
  - Municipality: 1,794
  - Density: 6.7/km^{2} (17/sq mi)
  - Urban: 1,274
  - Urban density: 792.4/km^{2} (2,052/sq mi)
  - Pop (2016-21): ▼5.1%
  - Dwellings: 983
- Time zone: UTC−05:00 (EST)
  - Summer (DST): UTC−04:00 (EDT)
- Postal code(s): G0T 1K0
- Area codes: 418 and 581
- Highways: R-138
- Website: escoumins.ca

Les Escoumins (French pronunciation: [lez‿ɛskumɛ̃]) is a municipality in La Haute-Côte-Nord Regional County Municipality in the Côte-Nord region of Quebec, Canada. It is located on the north shore of the maritime estuary of the St. Lawrence River.

Its name has traditionally been recognized to come from the Innu-aimun iskomin, meaning "where there are many seeds" or "there are fruits or seeds", in turn from the roots isko or ishko ("as far as this/that") and min (red seeds, or wild berries in general). According to more recent theory, it could also be a variation of the Mi'kmaq term eskumunaak, meaning "lookout place". In addition, other sources say that the place is named Essipit in Innu-aimun, meaning "river of shells".

Several spellings have been used over the centuries such as Uscamin, Les Escoumains, Essuie-Mains, L'Esquemin, Lesquemin, Leschemin (Champlain, 1629), L'Esquemain, and Lesquemain (1611 map of Champlain and other texts of 1626). The oldest reference to this name dates back to the map of Levasseur of 1601, that shows Escanimes; and to a contract of 1604 that included the rare spelling Esguenim.

== History ==
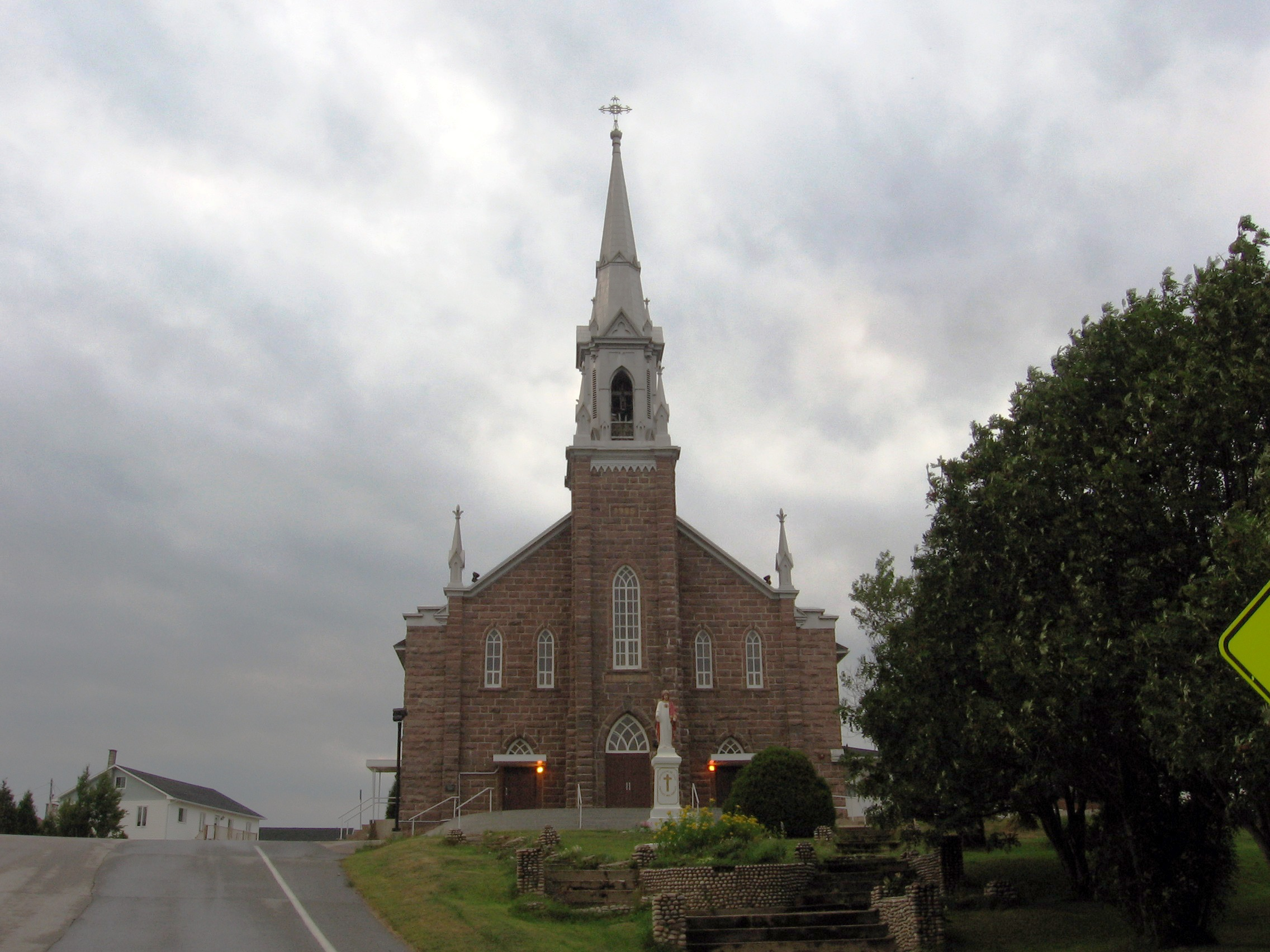
St. Marcelin, Catholic parish church

The area is considered the cradle of the Côte-Nord Amerindian, who have lived there for thousands of years. The Innu (Montagnais) and Mi'kmaq frequented the area, particularly in the spring to gather berries that covered the rocks and adorned the mossy plains.

The first Europeans in the area were the Basques around the 1630s. In 1723, a cross was erected in honour of Our Dame of Bon-Désir, thereafter the place was also known as Bon-Desir. That same year the Mission of Saint-Marcellin was founded. But the first permanent European settler in Escoumins was Joseph Moreau, an employee of the Hudson's Bay Company, who arrived in 1825. It wasn't until 1845 that a real village began to form when many families from the south shore of the St. Lawrence River, especially from Trois-Pistoles, Rivière-Ouelle, Rimouski, and a group of Charlevoix settled there.

In 1853, the local post office opened. The timber trade caused the village to grow rapidly when logs were floated down the Escoumins River from the cutting area to the Bay des Escoumins where they were loaded in barges. In 1863, the Municipality of Les Escoumains was formed. In the beginning of 1957, the spelling of the municipality's name was corrected to the current form.

== Geography ==
On the north shore of the St. Lawrence River, surrounded by a multitude of bodies of water and vast expanses of sand, Les Escoumins is located approximately 40 km northeast of Tadoussac, between Bergeronnes and Saint-Paul-du -North.

From its docks, it is even possible to observe marine mammals and even the largest living being on earth, the blue whale.

- Balaenoptera musculus. — Baleine bleue, Rorqual bleu. — (Blue whale).
Vessels and docks overview

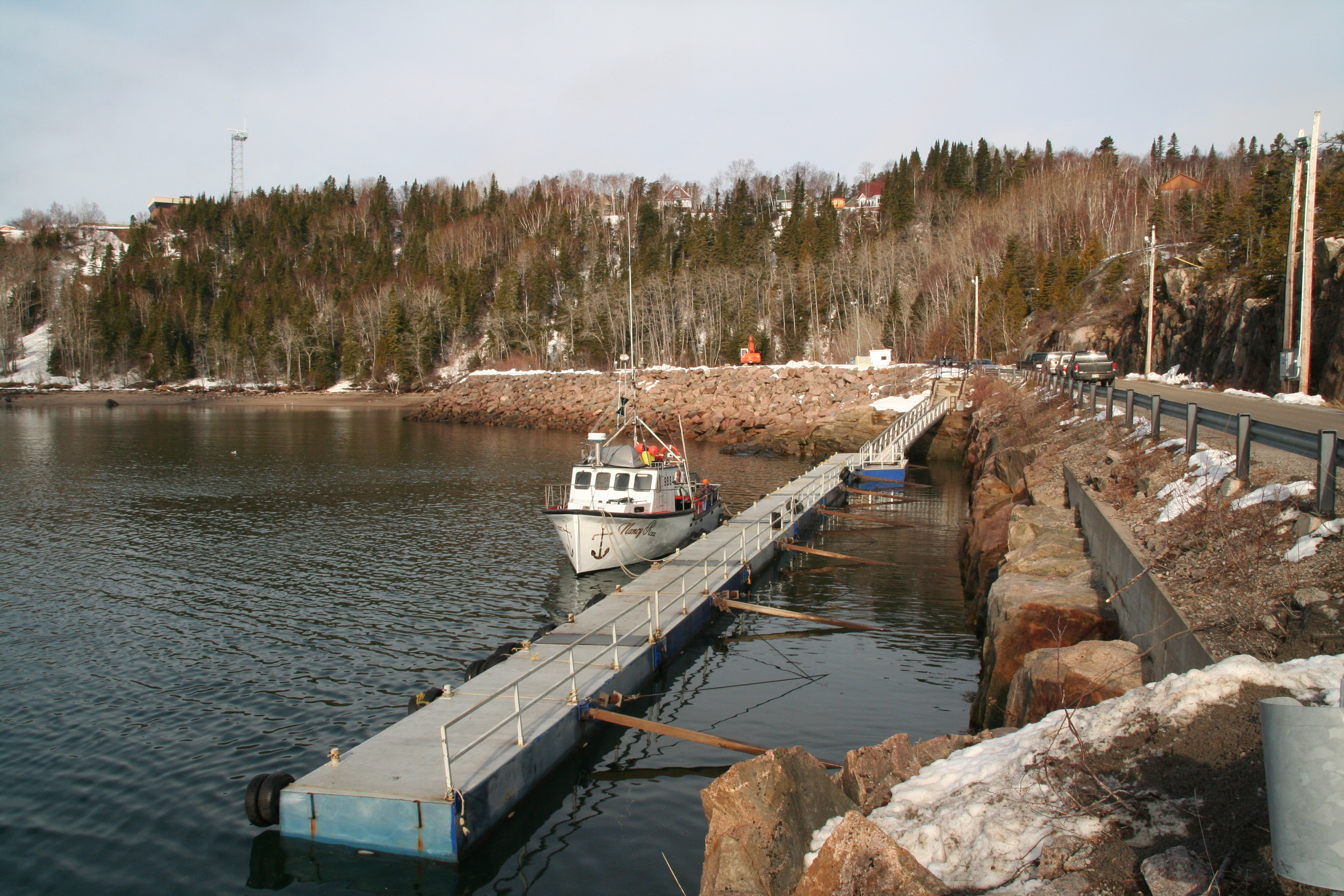
Crab fishing boat at Fisheries and Oceans Canada’s pontoons, Anse aux Basques

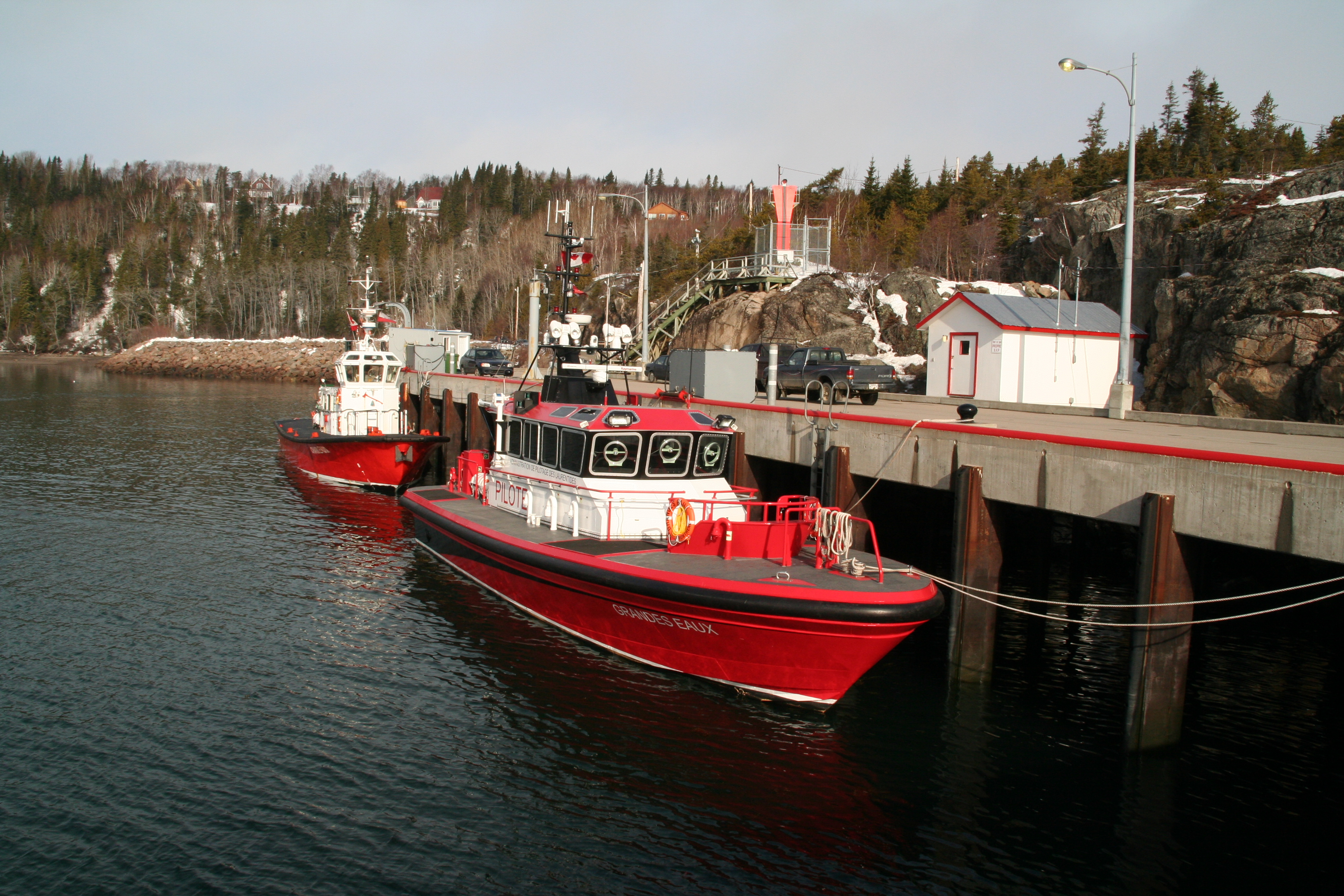
Grandes Eaux, pilot boat, Anse aux Basques

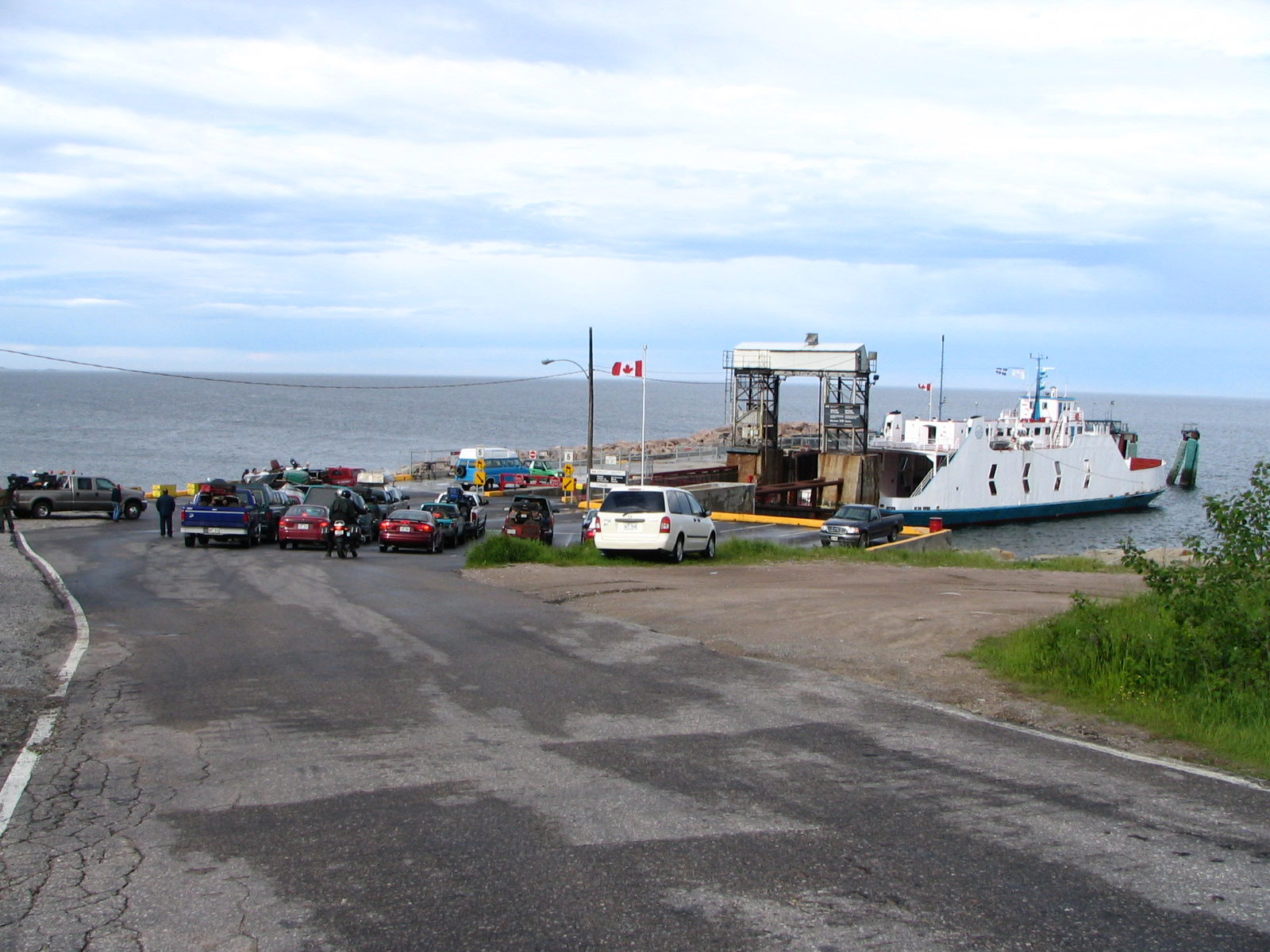
Heritage 1, Ferry embarkation of vehicles from the Escoumins marine terminal to Trois-Pistoles

Year-round service is available from Laurentian Pilotage Authority. A ferry service runs between Les Escoumins and Trois-Pistoles.

The Marine Environment Discovery Centre is the main diving attraction in the region. It is also an interpretation centre for the fauna and flora of the Saguenay–St. Lawrence Marine Park, allowing you to discover the subarctic underwater ecosystem and hear the divers-biologists describe its particularities.

== Demographics ==
In the 2021 Canadian census conducted by Statistics Canada, Les Escoumins had a population of 1,794 living in 856 of its 983 total private dwellings, a change of −5.1% from its 2016 population of 1,891. With a land area of 265.89 km^{2} (102.66 sq mi), it had a population density of 6.7/km^{2} (17.5/sq mi) in 2021.

The median age of the population in 2021 was 54.8 and 92% of the people were over 15. At the same census 14.86% reported being Indigenous, almost evenly divided between Métis and First Nations.

Languages spoken at the 2021 census, as a mother tongue were French (99.71%), English (0.29%), and other languages (0.29%).

Federal census population history of Les Escoumins

Year	Pop.	±%
1871	1,023	—
1881	520	−49.2%
1891	667	+28.3%
1901	490	−26.5%
1911	949	+93.7%
1921	986	+3.9%
1931	1,173	+19.0%
1941	1,252	+6.7%

Year	Pop.	±%
1951	1,766	+41.1%
1956	1,928	+9.2%
1961	2,223	+15.3%
1966	2,573	+15.7%
1971	2,420	−5.9%
1976	2,324	−4.0%
1981	2,394	+3.0%
1986	2,340	−2.3%

Year	Pop.	±%
1991	2,212	−5.5%
1996	2,136	−3.4%
2001	2,106	−1.4%
2006	2,073	−1.6%
2011	2,000	−3.5%
2016	1,891	−5.4%
2021	1,794	−5.1%

Source: Statistics Canada

== Economy ==
Its economy is mostly based on the service sectors, especially education, health, and tourism.

== Attractions ==
The Marine Environment Discovery Centre in Les Escoumins offers snorkelling and scuba diving, and observation areas for seals, seabirds, and whales, within the Saguenay–St. Lawrence Marine Park.

== Infrastructure ==
The village is currently the largest of the so-called "Secteur BEST" (i.e. the municipalities of Bergeronnes, Escoumins, Sacré-Coeur, Tadoussac). It is home to a hospital (The Centre de santé de la Haute-Côte-Nord, previously known as Hôpital St-Alexandre), an Indian reserve (Essipit, an Innu community), an FM radio station, CHME, is located within Essipit.

It is accessible via The Whale Route (Route 138).

With 33 000 km of trails, The Federation of Snowmobile Clubs of Quebec and La Minganie Snowmobile Club, based in Les Escoumins, offer detailed interactive maps on the different circuits and their points of services.

=== Transportation ===
It is accessible via The Whale Route (Route 138) and by the sea.

Year-round service is available from Laurentian Pilotage Authority. A ferry service runs between Les Escoumins and Trois-Pistoles.

== Media ==
CHME-FM is a radio station in the community.

== See also ==
- List of municipalities in Quebec
