= Essipit =

- Indian reserve
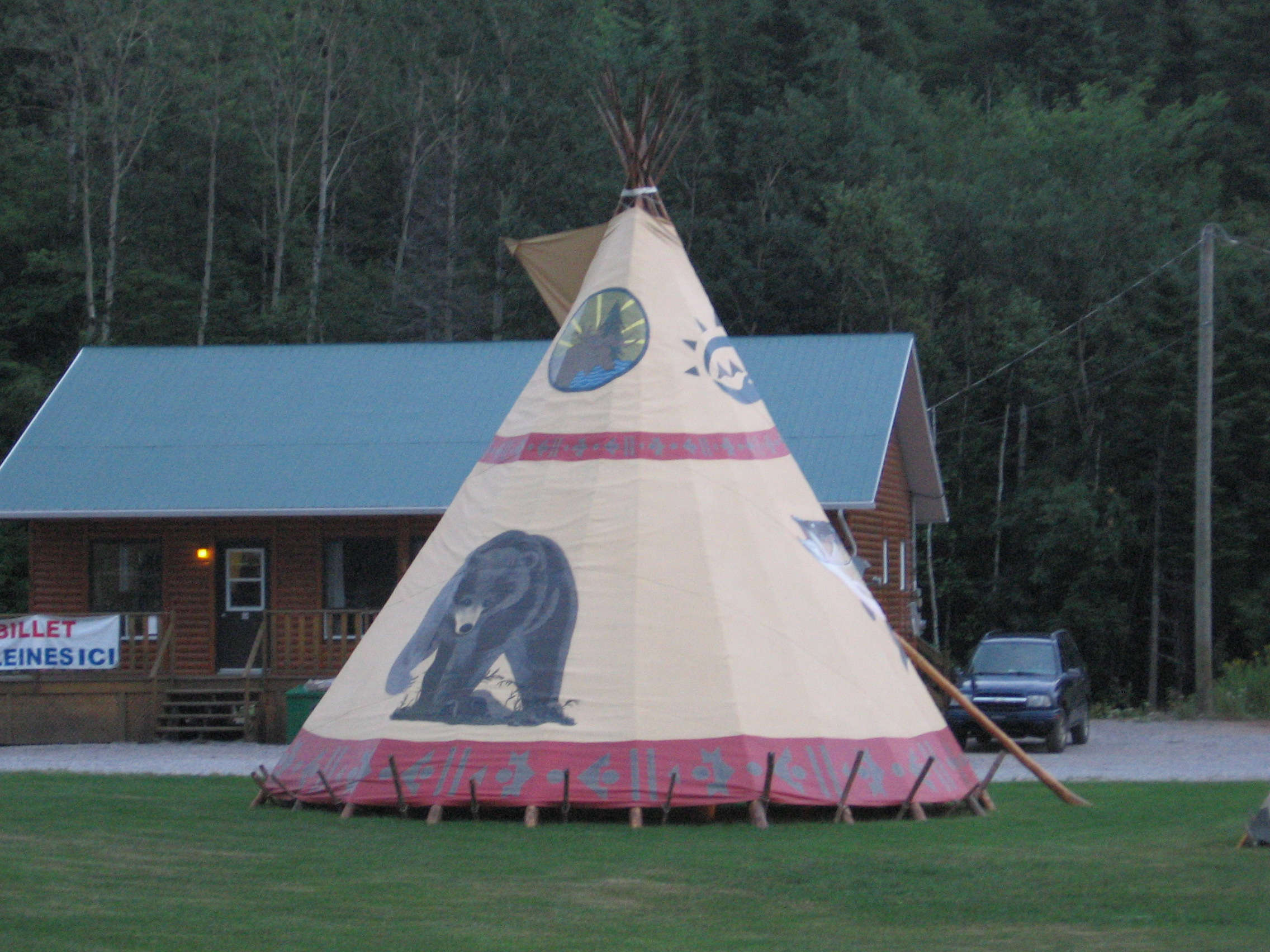

- Location within Côte-Nord region, Quebec
- Coordinates: 48°20′N 69°24′W
- Country: Canada
- Province: Quebec
- Region: Côte-Nord
- Regional county: None
- Formed: 1892 (reserve)

Government
  - Chief: Martin Dufour
  - Federal riding: Côte-Nord—Kawawachikamach—Nitassinan
  - Prov. riding: René-Lévesque

Area
  - Land: 1.13 km^{2} (0.44 sq mi)

Population (2021)
  - Total: 310
  - Density: 274.5/km^{2} (711/sq mi)
- Time zone: UTC-5 (EST)
  - Summer (DST): UTC-4 (EDT)
- Postal Code: G0T 1K0
- Area codes: 418 and 581
- Website: www.innu-essipit.com

Essipit (known as Les Escoumins until 1996) is an Innu Indian reserve in the Canadian province of Quebec, located on the north shore of the Gulf of Saint Lawrence in the Côte-Nord region. It belongs to the Innue Essipit First Nation.

The reserve is named after the historical name of the Escoumins River, that around 1664, was known as Esseigiou. Charles Arnaud, who spent many years of his life among the Innu stated that the river was also called Etshipi, meaning "river of shells".

== History ==
The Innu have frequented the place for thousands of years, gathering berries that covered the rocks and adorned the mossy plains in the spring. The Jesuit Relations reported on the presence of "Excomminquois" in the region since 1611. It presented them however as an enemy nation of the French and distinguished them from the Innu of the region who were recognized as friends. It is assumed that they likely were Mi'kmaq tribes that from the middle of the 16th century onwards sporadically left their territory around Chaleur Bay and visited the North Shore of the Saint Lawrence Gulf.

In 1863, about 40 Innu people were counted at the Mission of Escoumins. In 1881, the Superintendent of Indian Affairs appointed surveyor Elzéar Boivin to delineate the land occupied by them. On July 23, 1892, the Government of Canada purchased the land and the Réserve indienne des Escoumins (Escoumins Indian Reserve) was formed.

In 1994, the reserve changed its name to Communauté montagnaise Essipit, made official by Commission de toponymie du Québec on June 7, 1996. On August 7, 2003, the name was changed again, and it is now known as Innue Essipit.

== Demographics ==
Reserve population trend:

- Population in 2021: 310 (2016 to 2021 population change: 4.4%)
- Population in 2016: 297
- Population in 2011: 268
- Population in 2006: 247
- Population in 2001: 258
- Population in 1996: 252
- Population in 1991: 237

Private dwellings occupied by usual residents: 128 (total dwellings: 134)

The total population of the Essipit First Nation is 1,050, with only 228 band members living on the reserve.
