= Macamic =

- City
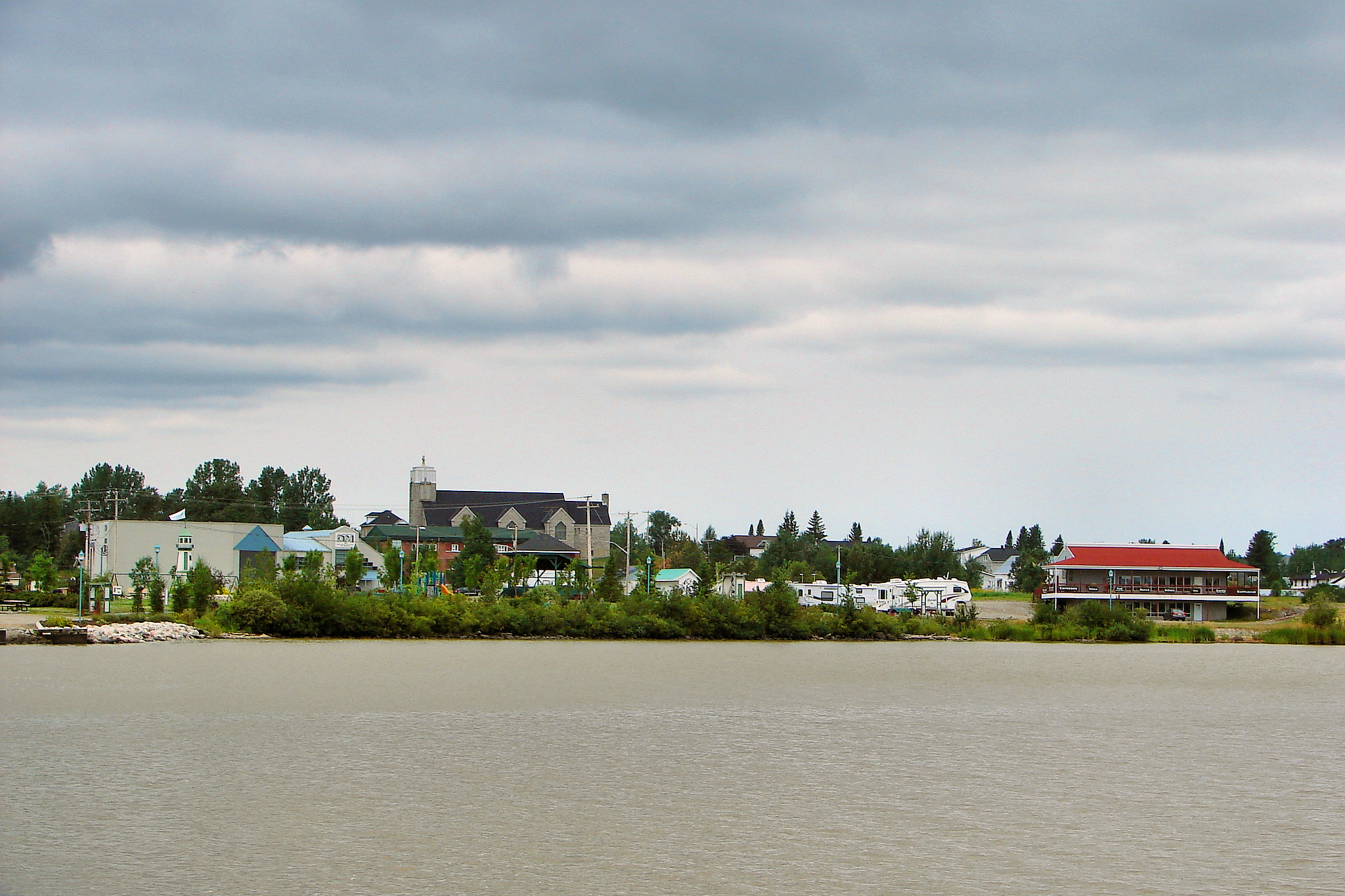
- Motto(s): Vois juste, probité engendre honneur ("Do right, integrity begets honour")
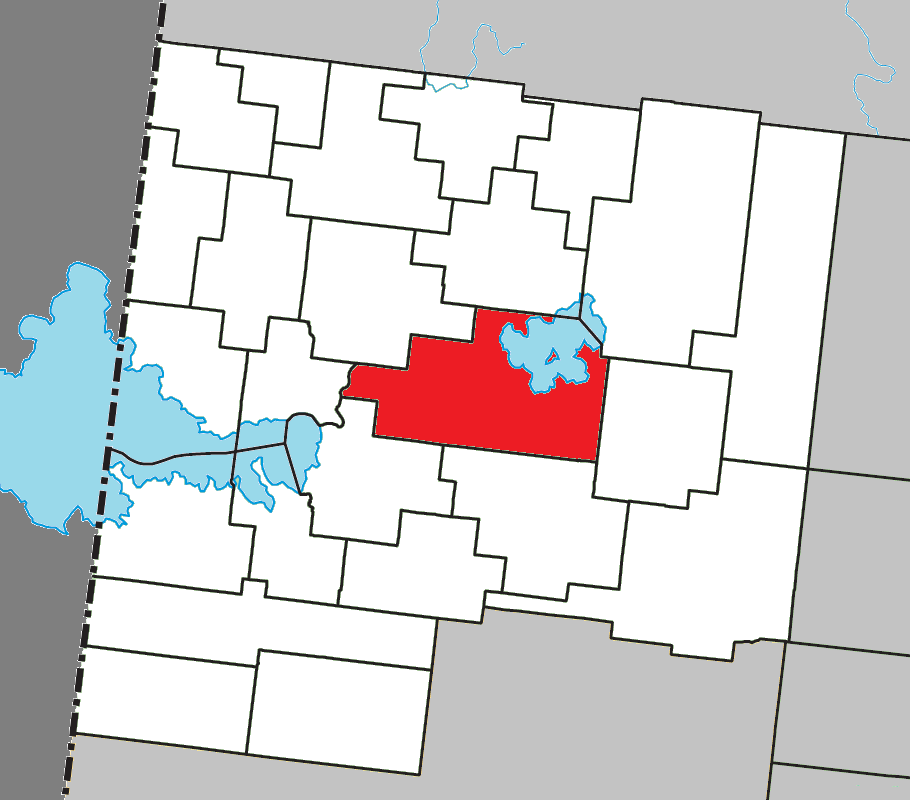
- Location within Abitibi-Ouest RCM

- Location in western Quebec
- Coordinates: 48°45′N 79°00′W
- Country: Canada
- Province: Quebec
- Region: Abitibi-Témiscamingue
- RCM: Abitibi-Ouest
- Settled: 1913
- Constituted: March 6, 2002

Government
  - Mayor: Tony Boudreau
  - Federal riding: Abitibi—Témiscamingue
  - Prov. riding: Abitibi-Ouest

Area
  - Total: 240.62 km^{2} (92.90 sq mi)
  - Land: 202.05 km^{2} (78.01 sq mi)
  - Urban: 2.00 km^{2} (0.77 sq mi)

Population (2021)
  - Total: 2,744
  - Density: 13.5/km^{2} (35/sq mi)
  - Urban: 1,352
  - Urban density: 676/km^{2} (1,750/sq mi)
  - Pop (2016-2021): ▼0.3%
  - Dwellings: 1,188
- Time zone: UTC−5 (EST)
  - Summer (DST): UTC−4 (EDT)
- Postal code(s): J0Z 2S0
- Area code: 819
- Highways: R-101; R-111; R-393
- Website: www.villemacamic.qc.ca

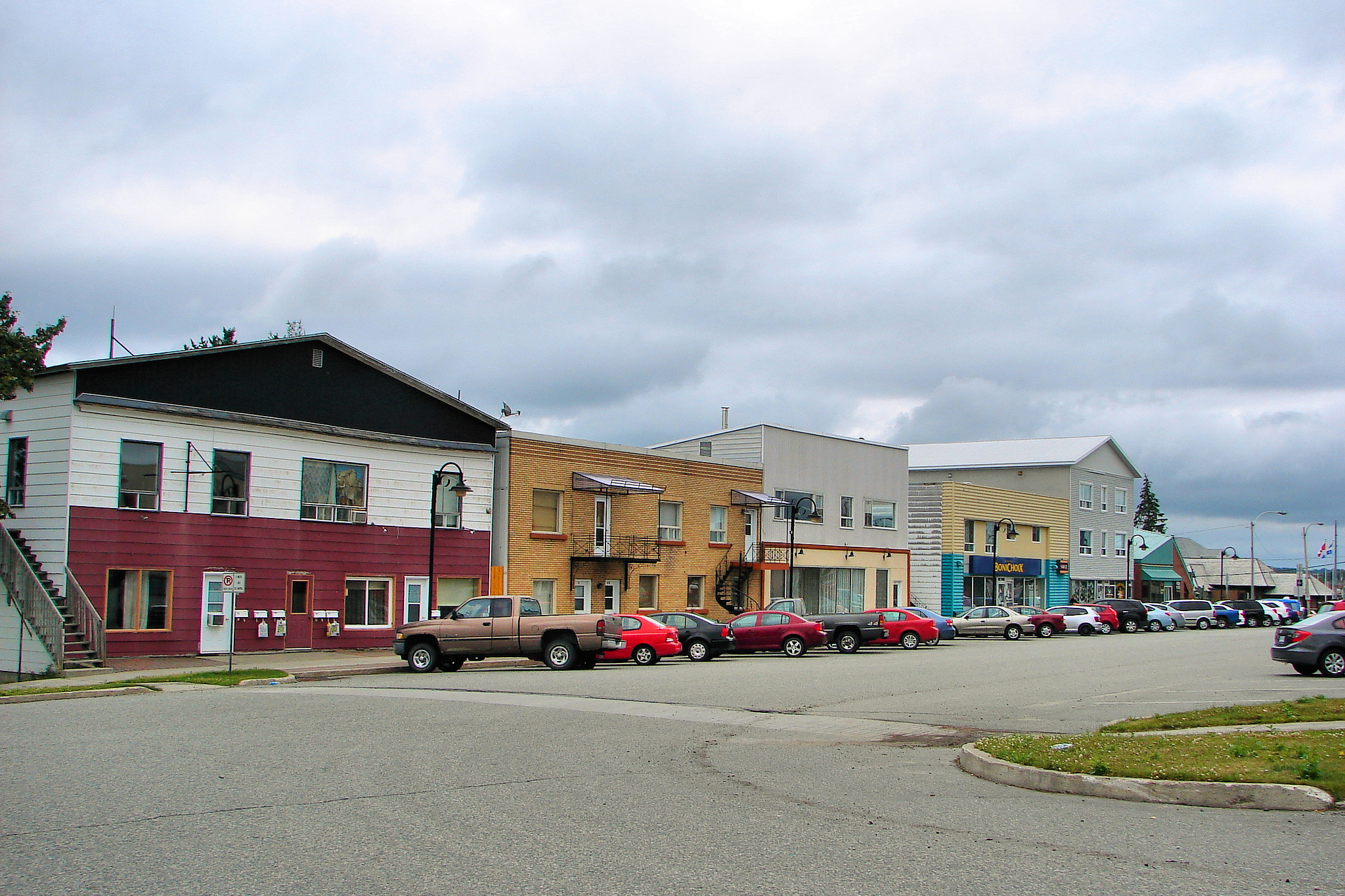
Rue Principale

Macamic (French pronunciation: [makamik]) is a ville in northwestern Quebec, Canada, in the Abitibi-Ouest Regional County Municipality. It covers 202 km² and had a population of 2,744 in the 2021 Canadian census. It is located on the shores of the namesake Lake Macamic.

In addition to Macamic itself, the town's territory also includes the community of Colombourg.

== History ==
Colonization began at the time when the National Transcontinental Railway running through the Abitibi region was completed. The first pioneers, arriving circa 1913, were originally from Saint-Ignace-du-Lac, Pierreville, Stanfold, Nicolet, and Shawinigan. They settled south of Lake Macamic and the new settlement took the lake's name, often written also as Makamik. In the Algonquin language, the name Makamik means "limping beaver", from makis (crippled or disabled) and amik (beaver).

In 1914, Makamik had 100 residents. In 1915, the year the post office opened, it had grown to 300, and the following year, when the Parish of Saint-Jean-l'Évangéliste-de-Macamic was formed, there were 500 persons. By 1918, the population had jumped to 1750 and the area was incorporated as the United Township Municipality of Royal-Roussillon-et-Poularies, named after the Royal-Roussillon Regiment of Montcalm's army and after lieutenant-colonel François-Médard de Poularies, commander of this regiment.

In 1919, the village itself separated from the united township and was incorporated as Village Municipality of Macamic, having a population of 2300 persons by 1920. In 1924, Poularies Township also separated from Royal-Roussillon-et-Poularies, which became the Parish Municipality of Royal-Roussillon-de-Macamic in 1952, and officially shortened to just Macamic in 1961.

In 1955, the Village Municipality of Macamic changed its status to town (ville), and was regrouped with the Parish Municipality of Macamic on June 13, 2001, to form the new Town of Macamic. On March 2, 2002, the Municipality of Colombourg (incorporated in 1926) was merged into Macamic.

== Demographics ==
In the 2021 Census of Population conducted by Statistics Canada, Macamic had a population of 2,744 living in 1,142 of its 1,188 total private dwellings, a change of −0.3% from its 2016 population of 2,751. With a land area of 202.05 km^{2} (78.01 sq mi), it had a population density of 13.6/km^{2} (35.2/sq mi) in 2021.

Canada census – Macamic community profile

	2021	2016	2011
Population	2,744 (-0.3% from 2016)	2,751 (+0.6% from 2011)	2,734 (+0.3% from 2006)
Land area	202.05 km^{2} (78.01 sq mi)	202.70 km^{2} (78.26 sq mi)	202.34 km^{2} (78.12 sq mi)
Population density	13.6/km^{2} (35/sq mi)	13.6/km^{2} (35/sq mi)	13.5/km^{2} (35/sq mi)
Median age	43.6 (M: 43.6, F: 43.6)	45.8 (M: 44.6, F: 46.8)	46.5 (M: 46.6, F: 46.3)
Private dwellings	1,188 (total) 1,142 (occupied)	1,179 (total)	1,148 (total)
Median household income	$73,500	$62,763	$60,961

References: 2021 2016 2011

Historical census populations – Macamic

Year	Pop.	±%
1921	1,104	—
1931	821	−25.6%
1941	645	−21.4%
1951	1,123	+74.1%
1956	1,388	+23.6%
1961	1,614	+16.3%

Year	Pop.	±%
1966	1,770	+9.7%
1971	1,705	−3.7%
1976	1,733	+1.6%
1981	1,791	+3.3%
1986	1,821	+1.7%
1991	1,833	+0.7%

Year	Pop.	±%
1996	1,711	−6.7%
2001	1,519	−11.2%
2006	2,726	+79.5%
2011	2,734	+0.3%
2016	2,751	+0.6%
2021	2,744	−0.3%

Between 2001 and 2006, the parish of Macamic and the municipality of Colombourg merged with the city of Macamic.

=== Language ===
Canada Census Mother Tongue - Macamic, Quebec
Census	Total	French			English			French & English			Other		
Year	Responses	Count	Trend	Pop %	Count	Trend	Pop %	Count	Trend	Pop %	Count	Trend	Pop %
2021	2,680	2,650	▲1.5%	98.9%	15	0.0%	0.6%	5	▼50.0%	0.2%	10	▲100.0%	0.4%
2016	2,645	2,610	▲1.4%	98.7%	15	▲50.0%	0.6%	10	▲100.0%	0.4%	5	▼50.0%	0.2%
2011	2,600	2,575	▲1.6%	99.0%	10	▲ n/a%	0.4%	5	▼50.0%	0.2%	10	▲ n/a%	0.4%
2006	2,550	2,535	▲5.5%	99.4%	0	0.0%	0.0%	10	▲ n/a%	0.4%	0	0.0%	0.0%
2001	1,375	1,380	▼7.7%	100.0%	0	0.0%	0.0%	0	0.0%	0.0%	0	0.0%	0.0%
1996	1,500	1,495	n/a	99.7%	0	n/a	0.0%	0	n/a	0.0%	0	n/a	0.0%

== Government ==
Municipal council (as of 2024):

- Mayor: Tony Boudreau
- Councillors: Gaétan Morin, Francine Néron, Cindy Boucher, Miriam Bruneau, Ghislain Brunet, Michel Deschênes

List of former mayors (since formation of current municipality):

- Daniel Rancourt (2002–2013)
- Claude Nelson Morin (2013–2017)
- Lina Lafrenière (2017–2023)
- Tony Boudreau (2024–present)

=== Political representation ===
Macamic federal election results
Year	Liberal		Conservative		Bloc Québécois		New Democratic		Green	
2021	24%	303	16%	202	43%	538	6%	74	2%	27
2019	19%	272	30%	431	38%	556	7%	105	3%	43
2015	28%	223	4%	33	22%	175	44%	349	2%	14
2011	6%	60	10%	102	27%	284	56%	592	1%	12
2008	22%	202	18%	168	47%	432	10%	92	3%	25
2006	12%	117	28%	279	48%	481	11%	109	2%	24
2004	32%	308	6%	61	56%	533	2%	20	3%	30

Macamic provincial election results
Year	CAQ		Liberal		QC solidaire		Parti Québécois	
2022	42%	375	4%	33	18%	157	26%	227
2018	43%	668	14%	220	16%	245	22%	344
2014	17%	265	36%	541	7%	104	36%	539
2012	21%	226	24%	262	6%	60	44%	471

Federally, Macamic is part of the federal riding of Abitibi—Témiscamingue. In the 2021 Canadian federal election, the incumbent Sébastien Lemire of the Bloc Québécois was re-elected to represent the population Macamic in the House of Commons of Canada.

Provincially it is part of the riding of Abitibi-Ouest. In the 2022 Quebec general election the incumbent MNA Suzanne Blais, of the Coalition Avenir Québec, was re-elected to represent the population of Macamic in the National Assembly of Quebec.
