= Lake Abitibi =

Lake on Ontario / Quebec border, Canada

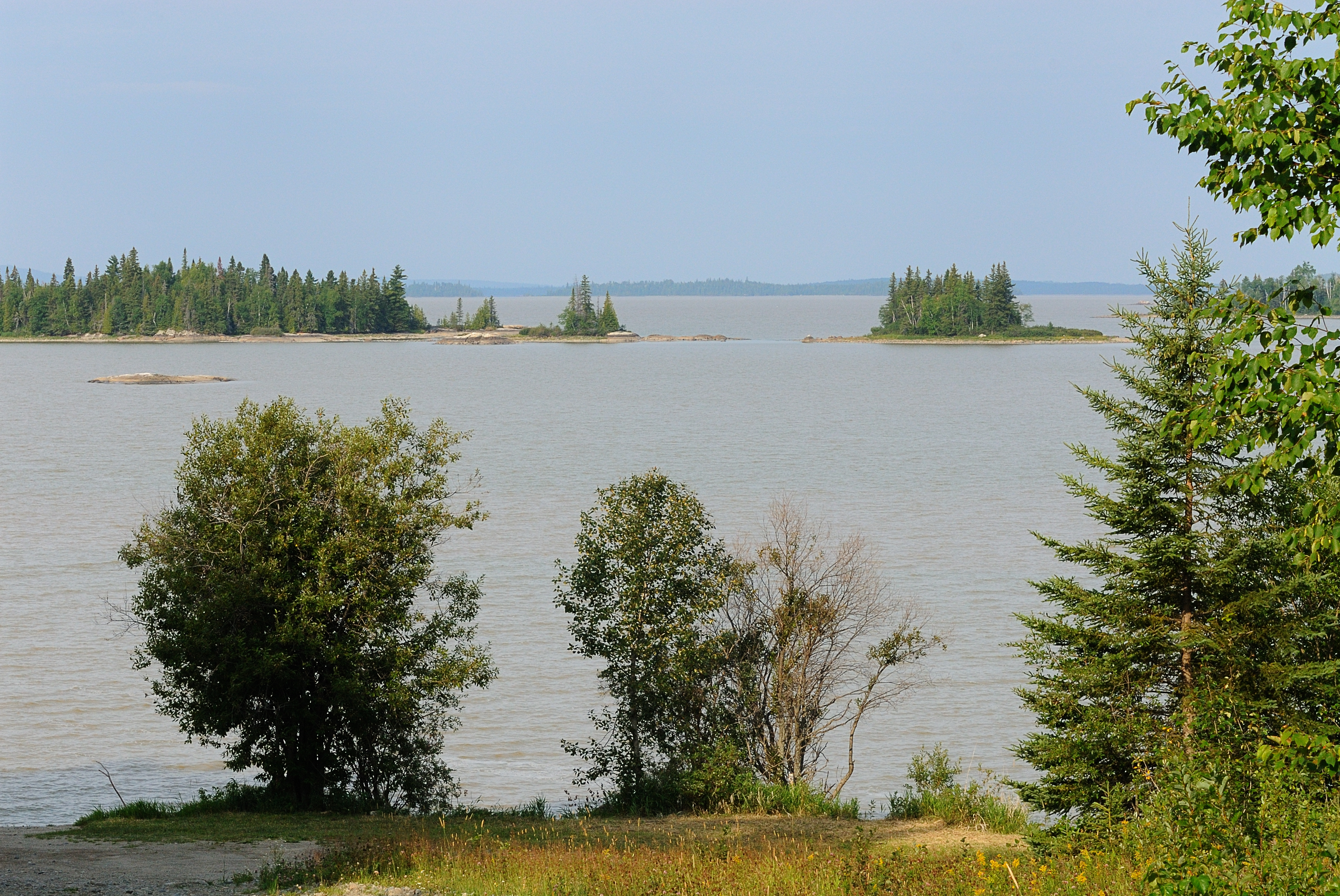
- Lake Abitibi seen from Nepawa Island

- Location in Ontario and Quebec
- Location: Cochrane District, Ontario / Abitibi-Ouest Regional County Municipality, Quebec
- Coordinates: 48°40′N 79°45′W
- Primary inflows: Dagenais River, Duparquet River, La Reine River, La Sarre River, Low Bush River
- Primary outflows: Abitibi River
- Basin countries: Canada
- Surface area: 931 km^{2} (359 sq mi)
- Average depth: 3.5 m (11 ft)
- Max. depth: 15.0 m (49.2 ft)
- Surface elevation: 265 m (869 ft)
- Islands: over 900

Lake Abitibi (French: Lac Abitibi, Ojibwe: Aabitibiiwi-zaaga’igan) is a shallow lake in northeastern Ontario and western Quebec, Canada.

The lake, which lies within the vast Clay Belt, takes its name from the river. "Abitibi" comes from the Algonquin words abitah, meaning middle and nipi meaning water, possibly a reference to its geographic location between the Harricana (from the Algonquin word Nanikana, meaning "the main way") to the east and the Kapuskasing–Mattagami river system to the west.

Portions of Lake Abitibi's southern shores and a section of the Abitibi River are part of the Abitibi-de-Troyes Provincial Park. The islands in Ontario's portion of the lake are protected in the Lake Abitibi Islands Provincial Park. The entire McDougall Point Peninsula, that separates the lake in two, is part of the 6,036 hectares (14,920 acres) Mcdougal Point Peninsula Conservation Reserve.

Pointe Abitibi at the mouth of the Duparquet River (today part of Gallichan municipality) is a National Historic Site of Canada. This 272 hectares (670 acres) site, known as Apitipik National Historic Site of Canada, was a summer gathering place for the Abitibiwinnik until 1956 and the location of several trading posts between 1686 and 1922.

== Geography ==
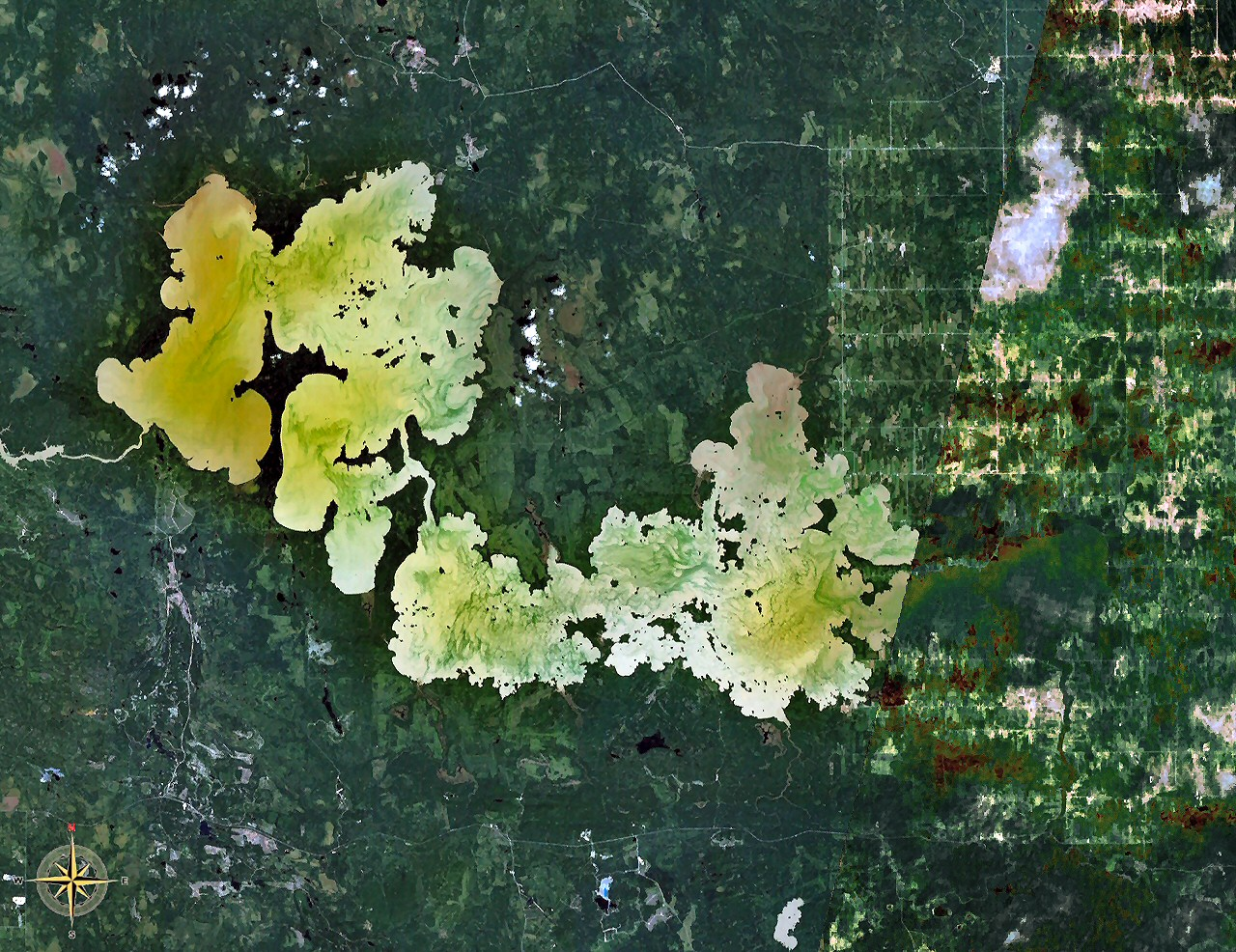
Satellite view. The Ontario–Quebec border is visible as a vertical line between undeveloped land in Ontario (left side) and the rectangular agricultural patterns in Quebec (right side).

Abitibi Lake is separated in two distinct portions by a short narrows, making it actually two lakes. Its total area is 931 square kilometres (359 sq mi), and net area 903 square kilometres (349 sq mi). The lake is shallow and studded with islands. Its shores and vicinity are covered with small timber.

Its outlet is the Abitibi River, a tributary of the Moose River, which empties into James Bay. Water levels on the lake are influenced by the Twin Falls Dam on the Abitibi River.

== History ==
Artifacts dating to the Late Archaic period have been found at Lake Abitibi.

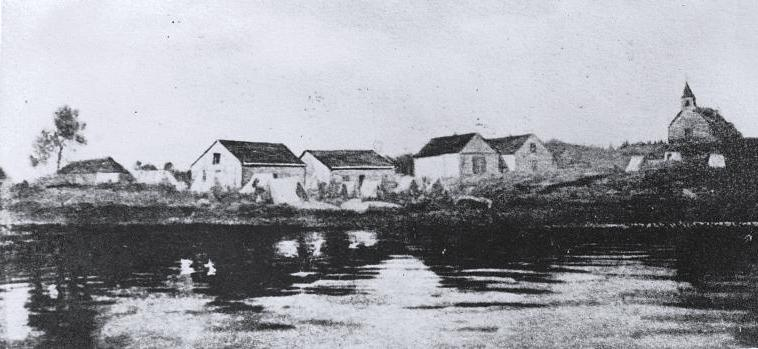
Hudson's Bay Company post on Lake Abitibi, c. 1910

Application of Abitibi to describe the lake and the people living in the area around it was first noted in The Jesuit Relations in 1640. One of the first Europeans in this area was Pierre de Troyes, who built a post on Lake Abitibi when he was on his way to capture English HBC posts on James Bay in 1686. The Abitibi Post lay halfway between trading posts on James Bay and those on the Ottawa River and was in continuous existence throughout the French period.

The lake was part of the canoe route from James Bay to Montreal, via the Moose and Abitibi Rivers, then a series of intermediate streams and portages to Lake Temiskaming and the Ottawa River.

After the British conquered Canada in 1763, free traders either took over the French fort or built another post on the lake, providing strong trading competition to the main Hudson's Bay Company (HBC) fort at Moose Factory and the HBC outpost at Frederick House. This moved the HBC to set up a post, called Abitibi House, on Lake Abitibi in 1794, located on the peninsula at the mouth of the Duparquet River. In subsequent decades this post, as well as competing posts of the North West Company, were rebuilt or moved to various locations around the lake and its islands. Being unproductive due to competition, the HBC abandoned Abitibi House in 1811. When two companies merged in 1821, the HBC took over the trading post of the North West Company on Lake Abitibi.

The construction of the Grand Trunk Pacific Railway (now Canadian National Railway) through this district made it of some importance at the start of the 20th century.

== Lake Abitibi Islands ==
Lake Abitibi Islands Provincial Park
- IUCN category Ia (strict nature reserve)
- Coordinates: 48°45′43″N 79°55′22″W
- Area: 2,721 ha (10.51 sq mi)
- Designation: Nature reserve
- Established: 2005
- Governing body: Ontario Parks

The Lake Abitibi Islands Provincial Park protects nearly all the islands on the Ontario side of Lake Abitibi. It includes 786 islands, from tiny shoals to large islands of up to 550 hectares (1,400 acres). Some of the larger islands are Deer, Dominion, and St. Patrick, as well as the Mistaken Islands (the largest island in the lake, Nepawa Island, is not part of the park since it is in Clerval, Quebec). The park was created in 2005 when the Abitibi-De-Troyes Provincial Park was reconfigured.

The park is an important nesting habitat for many bird species, including great blue heron, bald eagle, osprey, and double-crested cormorant. The vegetation is characterized by intolerant hardwood and mixedwood forests, with black spruce, white spruce, and white birch as the common tree species.

It is a non-operating park, meaning that there are no facilities or services, and only accessible via air or water.

== See also ==
- Pont de l'Île - covered bridge connecting Nepawa Island to the mainland
- Wahgoshig First Nation
- Blake River Megacaldera Complex
- List of lakes in Ontario
