= Saint-Mathieu-de-Rioux =

- Municipality
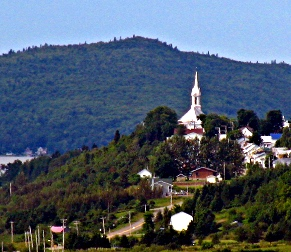
- A view of Saint-Mathieu-de-Rioux

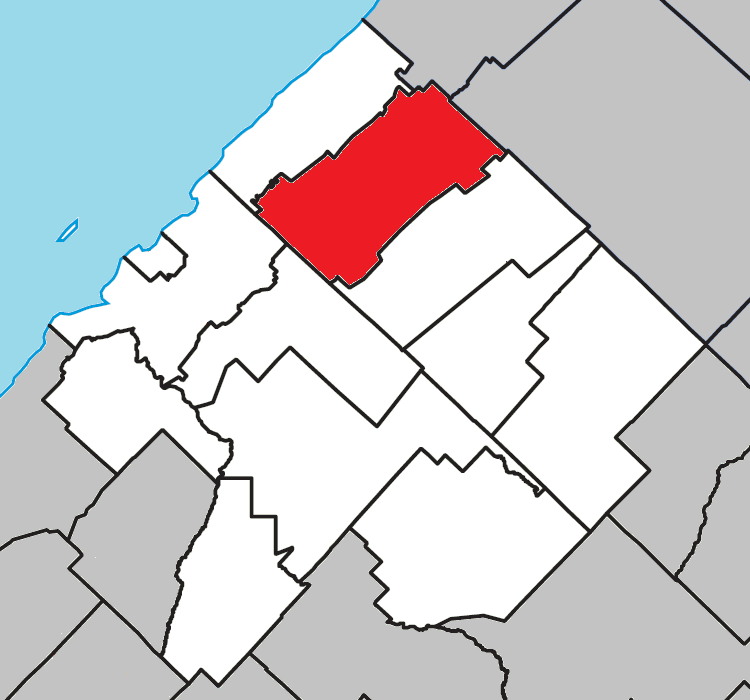
- Location within Les Basques RCM

- Location in eastern Quebec
- Coordinates: 48.18°N 68.98°W
- Country: Canada
- Province: Quebec
- Region: Bas-Saint-Laurent
- RCM: Les Basques
- Constituted: August 18, 1865

Government
  - Mayor: Marc Brunelle
  - Federal riding: Rimouski-Neigette—Mitis—Matapédia—Les Basques
  - Prov. riding: Rivière-du-Loup–Témiscouata–Les Basques

Area
  - Total: 115.20 km^{2} (44.48 sq mi)
  - Land: 107.27 km^{2} (41.42 sq mi)

Population (2021)
  - Total: 691
  - Density: 6.4/km^{2} (17/sq mi)
  - Pop 2016-2021: ▲8.1%
  - Dwellings: 573
- Time zone: UTC−5 (EST)
  - Summer (DST): UTC−4 (EDT)
- Postal code(s): G0L 3T0
- Area codes: 418 and 581
- Highways: No major routes
- Website: www.st-mathieu-de-rioux.ca

Saint-Mathieu-de-Rioux (French pronunciation: [sɛ̃ matjø də ʁju]) is a municipality in the Canadian province of Quebec, located in the Les Basques Regional County Municipality.

== Demographics ==
=== Population ===
Canada census – Saint-Mathieu-de-Rioux community profile

	2021	2016	2011
Population	691 (+8.1% from 2016)	639 (-5.8% from 2011)	678 (+0.9% from 2006)
Land area	107.27 km^{2} (41.42 sq mi)	107.82 km^{2} (41.63 sq mi)	107.77 km^{2} (41.61 sq mi)
Population density	6.4/km^{2} (17/sq mi)	5.9/km^{2} (15/sq mi)	6.3/km^{2} (16/sq mi)
Median age	54.8 (M: 55.2, F: 54.4)	56.3 (M: 57.2, F: 54.8)	52.0 (M: 52.9, F: 51.3)
Private dwellings	340 (total)	559 (total)	556 (total)
Median household income	$63,600	$54,336	$48,419

References: 2021 2016 2011

Historical Census Data - Saint-Mathieu-de-Rioux, Quebec
Year	Pop.	±%
1871	896	—
1881	1,175	+31.1%
1891	846	−28.0%
1901	893	+5.6%
1911	842	−5.7%
1921	781	−7.2%
1931	858	+9.9%
1941	1,056	+23.1%
1951	1,089	+3.1%
1956	1,193	+9.6%
1961	1,113	−6.7%
1966	1,097	−1.4%
1971	813	−25.9%
1976	723	−11.1%
1981	667	−7.7%
1986	621	−6.9%
1991	560	−9.8%
1996	565	+0.9%
2001	601	+6.4%
2006	672	+11.8%
2011	678	+0.9%
2016	639	−5.8%
2021	691	+8.1%

=== Language ===
Canada Census Mother Tongue - Saint-Mathieu-de-Rioux, Quebec
Census	Total	French			English			French & English			Other		
Year	Responses	Count	Trend	Pop %	Count	Trend	Pop %	Count	Trend	Pop %	Count	Trend	Pop %
2021	690	670	▲5.5%	97.1%	5	0.0%	0.7%	5	▲ n/a%	0.7%	5	0.0%	0.7%
2016	635	635	▼4.5%	100.0%	5	0.0%	0.8%	0	0.0%	0.0%	5	0.0%	0.8%
2011	675	665	▼0.7%	98.5%	5	▲ n/a%	0.7%	0	0.0%	0.0%	5	▲ n/a%	0.7%
2006	670	670	▲5.2%	100.0%	0	▼100.0%	0.0%	0	0.0%	0.0%	0	0.0%	0.0%
2001	645	635	▲11.0%	98.5%	10	▲ n/a%	1.6%	0	0.0%	0.0%	0	0.0%	0.0%
1996	565	565	n/a	100.0%	0	n/a	0.0%	0	n/a	0.0%	0	n/a	0.0%

== See also ==
- List of municipalities in Quebec
