= Clerval, Quebec =

Clerval
- Municipality
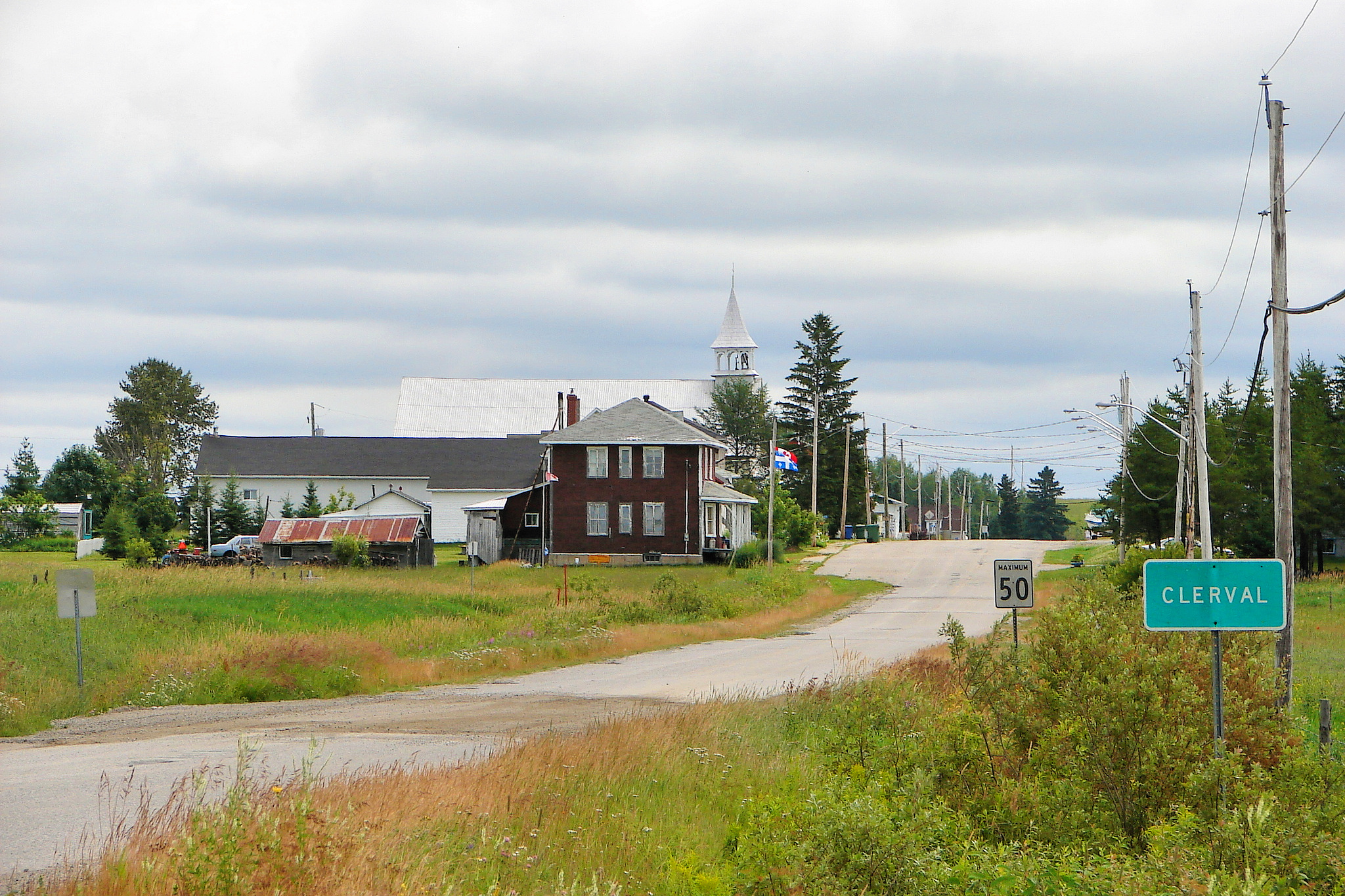

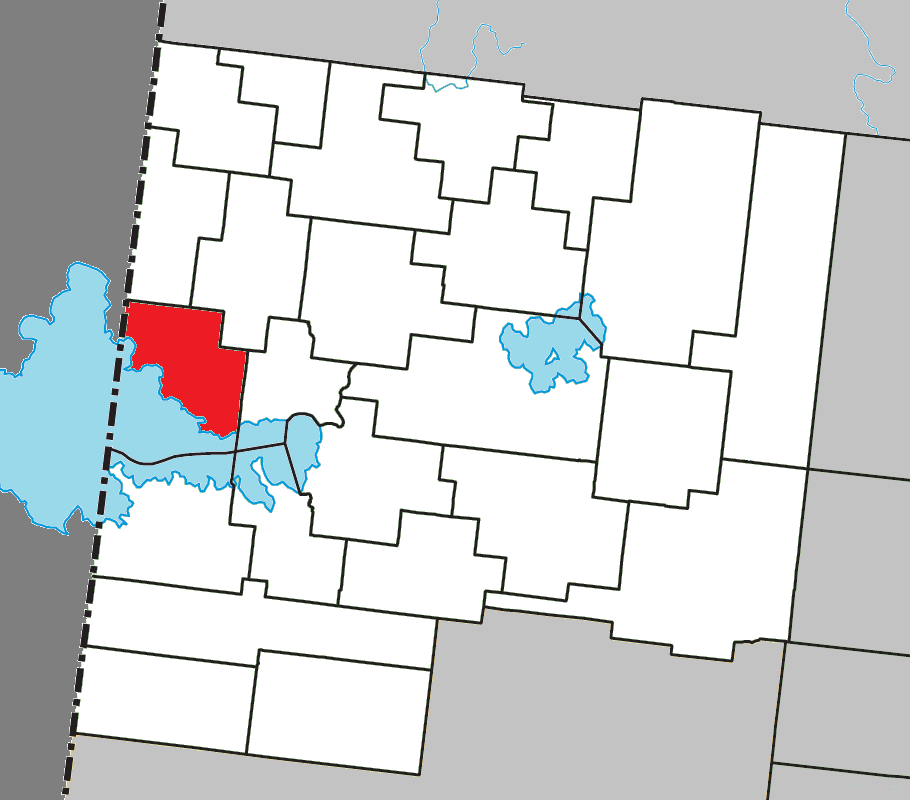
- Location within Abitibi-Ouest RCM

- Location in western Quebec
- Coordinates: 48°45′N 79°26′W
- Country: Canada
- Province: Quebec
- Region: Abitibi-Témiscamingue
- RCM: Abitibi-Ouest
- Settled: 1916
- Constituted: September 12, 1927

Government
  - Mayor: Michel Cliche
  - Federal riding: Abitibi—Témiscamingue
  - Prov. riding: Abitibi-Ouest

Area
  - Total: 130.93 km^{2} (50.55 sq mi)
  - Land: 99.17 km^{2} (38.29 sq mi)

Population (2021)
  - Total: 373
  - Density: 3.8/km^{2} (9.8/sq mi)
  - Pop (2016-21): ▲0.5%
  - Dwellings: 291
- Time zone: UTC−5 (EST)
  - Summer (DST): UTC−4 (EDT)
- Postal code(s): J0Z 1R0
- Area code: 819
- Highways: No major routes
- Website: clerval.ao.ca/fr/

Clerval (French pronunciation: [klɛʁval]) is a municipality in northwestern Quebec, Canada, in the Abitibi-Ouest Regional County Municipality. It covers 101.6 km² and had a population of 373 as of the 2021 Canadian census.

The municipality was incorporated on September 12, 1927, and originally called Sainte-Jeanne-d'Arc-de-Clerval. Likely the current name, adopted in 1951, is a portmanteau from the French words claire vallée, meaning "clear valley".

In addition to Clerval itself, the municipality also includes the community of L'Île-Nepawa (48°41′12″N 79°27′22″W), located on Nepawa Island in Lake Abitibi. Nepawa comes from the Algonquin language meaning "where one camps in passing" or "large island".

== Demographics ==
Historical census populations – Clerval, Quebec

Year	Pop.	±%
1931	486	—
1941	765	+57.4%
1951	845	+10.5%
1956	852	+0.8%
1961	775	−9.0%
1966	666	−14.1%

Year	Pop.	±%
1971	481	−27.8%
1976	374	−22.2%
1981	380	+1.6%
1986	365	−3.9%
1991	346	−5.2%
1996	356	+2.9%

Year	Pop.	±%
2001	351	−1.4%
2006	358	+2.0%
2011	364	+1.7%
2016	371	+1.9%
2021	373	+0.5%

Source: Statistics Canada

Private dwellings occupied by usual residents (2021): 180 (total dwellings: 291)

Mother tongue (2021):

- English as first language: 1.3%
- French as first language: 96%
- English and French as first language: 1.3%
- Other as first language: 0%

== Government ==
Municipal council (as of 2023):

- Mayor: Michel Cliche
- Councillors: Gaétan St-Jean, Claire Paquet, Mathilde Lévesque, Chantal Melançon, Nancy Gosselin, Nicole Therrien
