= Berthiaume Lake =

Lake in Lac-Jacques-Cartier, Quebec, Canada

- Location in Quebec
- Location: Lac-Jacques-Cartier (TNO), La Côte-de-Beaupré Regional County Municipality, Capitale-Nationale
- Coordinates: 47.81194°N 71.87527°W
- Lake type: Natural
- Primary inflows: (clockwise from the mouth) Décharge du lac des Pruches et Robillard, décharge du lac Pérusse, Métascouac River, décharge du lac Dyotte, décharge du lac Atlas.
- Primary outflows: Métascouac River
- Basin countries: Canada
- Max. length: 8.5 km (5.3 mi)
- Max. width: 1.2 km (0.75 mi)
- Surface elevation: 465 m (1,526 ft)

The lac Berthiaume (English: Berthiaume lake) is a freshwater body crossed by the Métascouac River, in the unorganized territory of Lac-Jacques-Cartier, in the La Côte-de-Beaupré Regional County Municipality, in the administrative region of Capitale-Nationale, in the province from Quebec, to Canada. Lac Berthiaume is located in the northwestern part of the Laurentides Wildlife Reserve.

Lac Berthiaume is located between route 169 (connecting Quebec to Alma) and route 155 (connecting La Tuque and Chambord). Some secondary forest roads serve this area for forestry and recreational tourism activities.

Forestry is the main economic activity in the sector; recreational tourism, second.

The surface of Berthiaume Lake is usually frozen from the beginning of December to the end of March, however the safe circulation on the ice is generally done from mid-December to mid-March.

== Geography ==
The main watersheds near Berthiaume Lake are:

- north side: lac aux Montagnais, lac Sérigny, lac de la Liberté, lac aux Écorces, Rivière aux Écorces, Lac Carbonneau;
- east side: Métascouac Lake, lac Tomachiche, lac Samson, lac Citoleux, lac de la Montagne, lac Érin, rivière aux Écorces;
- south side: Lac des Néréides, Métascouac River, Métabetchouane River, Saint-Henri Lake;
- west side: Robillard Lake, Métabetchouane River, Long Creek, Lac Saint-Jean.

Lac Berthiaume has a length of 8.5 km (5.3 mi), a width of 1.2 km (0.75 mi) and an altitude of 465 m (1,526 ft). This lake is mainly fed by the outlet (coming from the west) from Lac des Pruches and Robillard, the outlet (coming from the north) from Lake Pérusse, the Métascouac river (coming from the northeast), the outlet from Lake Dyotte, outlet of Atlas Lake. A kilometer-long strait (width: between 100 and 200 meters) separates the northern and southern parts of the lake. On the east side of Lac Berthiaume, a strip of 4.0 km (2.5 mi) (north–south direction) separates it from Métascouac Lake. In the southern part, a bay stretches to the northwest over 1.1 km (0.68 mi) and another stretches over 0.5 km (0.31 mi) to the east.

The mouth of Berthiaume Lake is located at the bottom of a bay, the extreme southeast of the lake, at:

- 3.4 km (2.1 mi) north-east of a curve on the course of the Métabetchouane River;
- 4.3 km (2.7 mi) south of Métascouac Lake;
- 4.6 km (2.9 mi) north of Saint-Henri Lake;
- 8.4 km (5.2 mi) east of Corneillier Lake;
- 10.7 km (6.6 mi) north-west of the confluence of the Métascouac River and Lac Ouelette which is contiguous to Petit lac Métascouac;
- 11.4 km (7.1 mi) south-west of a curve in the course of the rivière aux Écorces;
- 27.4 km (17.0 mi) east of the village center of Van Bruyssel located along the Canadian National railway;
- 72.3 km (44.9 mi) south-east of Lac Saint-Jean at the mouth of the Métabetchouane River.

From the mouth of Berthiaume Lake, the current follows the course of:

- Métascouac River on generally towards the southeast;
- Petit lac Métascouac on 3.7 km (2.3 mi) towards the south;
- Métabetchouane River on 126.6 km (78.7 mi) generally towards the northeast;
- Lac Saint-Jean on 22.25 km (13.83 mi) north-east until la petite Décharge;
- Saguenay River via the La Petite Décharge on 172.3 km (107.1 mi) eastwards to Tadoussac where it merges with the Saint Lawrence estuary.

== Toponymy ==
The toponym "Lac Berthiaume" was formalized on December 5, 1968, by the Commission de toponymie du Québec.

== Appendices ==
=== Related articles ===
- La Côte-de-Beaupré Regional County Municipality, a MRC
- Lac-Jacques-Cartier, a TNO
- Laurentides Wildlife Reserve.
- Métascouac Lake
- Métascouac River
- Métabetchouane River
- Lac Saint-Jean
- Saguenay River
- St. Lawrence River
- List of lakes in Canada
