= Lac aux Montagnais =

Lake in Quebec, Canada

- Location in Quebec
- Location: Lac-Jacques-Cartier (TNO), La Côte-de-Beaupré Regional County Municipality, Capitale-Nationale
- Coordinates: 47.88472°N 71.87556°W
- Lake type: Natural
- Primary inflows: (clockwise from the mouth) Ruisseaux riverains, décharge du lac Houlette, rivière aux Montagnais, ruisseau de l’Amitié..
- Primary outflows: Rivière aux Montagnais
- Basin countries: Canada
- Max. length: 4.0 km (2.5 mi)
- Max. width: 1.0 km (0.62 mi)
- Surface elevation: 494 m (1,621 ft)

The Lac aux Montagnais is a freshwater body at the head of the rivière aux Montagnais, in the unorganized territory of Lac-Jacques-Cartier, in the La Côte-de-Beaupré Regional County Municipality, in the administrative region of Capitale-Nationale, in the province, in Quebec, Canada. "Lac aux Montagnais" is located in the northwestern part of the Laurentides Wildlife Reserve.

Lac aux Montagnais is located between route 169 (connecting Quebec (city) to Alma) and route 155 (connecting La Tuque and Chambord). A forest road bypasses the northern part of the lake. Some secondary forest roads serve this area for forestry and recreational tourism activities.

Forestry is the main economic activity in the sector; recreational tourism, second.

The surface of "Lac aux Montagnais" is usually frozen from the beginning of December to the end of March, however the safe circulation on the ice is generally made from mid-December to mid-March.

== Geography ==
The main watersheds neighboring Lac aux Montagnais are:

- north side: Moufettes lake, Carbonneau lake, rivière aux Écorces;
- east side: Métascouac Lake, lac Tomachiche, lac Monbrion, lac aux Écorces, rivière aux Écorces;
- south side: lac aux Cailloux, Berthiaume Lake, Métascouac River, Métabetchouane River, Saint-Henri Lake;
- west side: Montagnais River, Moncouche River, Métabetchouane River, ruisseau Contourné, Lac Saint-Jean.

Lac aux Montagnais has a length of 4.0 kilometres (2.5 mi), a width of 1.0 kilometre (0.62 mi) and an altitude of 494 metres (1,621 ft). This lake is mainly fed by riverside streams, the outlet of Lake Houlette, the Montagnais river (coming from the south) and the Friendship stream. A peninsula attached to the north shore stretches 1.3 kilometres (0.81 mi) to the south. A strip of land 1.3 kilometres (0.81 mi) long on the east bank separates it from the Lac de l'Amitié.

The mouth of Lac aux Montagnais is located at the bottom of a bay at the extreme southeast of the lake, at:

- 5.4 kilometres (3.4 mi) north-west of Métascouac Lake;
- 8.1 kilometres (5.0 mi) south-east of the confluence of the Montagnais River and the Moncouche River;
- 9.2 kilometres (5.7 mi) south-east of the confluence of the Moncouche River and Métabetchouane River;
- 10.8 kilometres (6.7 mi) south-west of Lac aux Écorces;
- 20.5 kilometres (12.7 mi) east of the village center of Van Bruyssel located along the Canadian National railway;
- 59.0 kilometres (36.7 mi) south-east of lac Saint-Jean at the mouth of the Métabetchouane river.

From the mouth of Lac aux Montagnais, the current follows the course of:

- rivière aux Montagnais on 20.7 kilometres (12.9 mi) generally towards the northeast;
- Moncouche River on 5.0 kilometres (3.1 mi) generally towards the southwest;
- Métabetchouane River on 83.9 kilometres (52.1 mi) generally towards the northwest;
- lac Saint-Jean on 22.25 kilometres (13.83 mi) north-east until la petite Décharge;
- Saguenay River via the Petite Décharge on 172.3 kilometres (107.1 mi) eastwards to Tadoussac where it merges with the Saint Lawrence estuary.

== Toponymy ==
The specific term “Montagnais” designates one of the indigenous nations of the Algonquian family in eastern Canada, today known as “Innu”. Before the arrival of the first French settlers, the Innu occupied a huge territory of 600 kilometres (370 mi) in depth extending, on the north bank of the St. Lawrence River, the city of Quebec (city) at Labrador Sea. On the south shore, their territory included the hydrographic basins of the Rivière du Loup and the Matane River. Already in 1892, the surveyor Henry O'Sullivan described the lake in these terms: “Lac Montagnais. It is a magnificent sheet of water with a circumference of more than six miles. Well provided with spotted trout ”. Today, permanent installations welcome vacationers, hunters and fishermen to this lake formerly frequented, no doubt, by the Innu in the vicinity of Lac Saint-Jean.

The toponym lac aux Montagnais was formalized on December 5, 1968, by the Commission de toponymie du Québec.

== See also ==
- La Côte-de-Beaupré Regional County Municipality
- Lac-Jacques-Cartier, a TNO
- Laurentides Wildlife Reserve
- Rivière aux Montagnais
- Moncouche River
- Métabetchouane River
- Lac Saint-Jean
- Saguenay River
- St. Lawrence River
- List of lakes of Canada
