= Jacqueline Lake =

Lac Jacqueline
- Location in Quebec
- Location: Lac-Jacques-Cartier, La Côte-de-Beaupré Regional County Municipality
- Coordinates: 47.73667°N 71.36945°W
- Lake type: Natural
- Primary inflows: Ruisseaux riverains et décharge du lac Lory
- Primary outflows: Discharge going to rivière aux Écorces North-East
- Basin countries: Canada
- Max. length: 2.9 km (1.8 mi)
- Max. width: 0.75 km (0.47 mi)
- Surface elevation: 791 m (2,595 ft)

The Jacqueline Lake (French: Lac Jacqueline) is a fresh body of water from the catchment area of the Rivière aux Écorces, of the Pikauba River and Saguenay River, in the unorganized territory of Lac-Jacques-Cartier, in the La Côte-de-Beaupré Regional County Municipality, in the administrative region of Capitale-Nationale, in the province of Quebec, in Canada.

The area around the lake is served indirectly by the route 175 which passes on the east side, for the needs of recreational tourism activities, especially vacationing. A secondary forest road passes between Lake Jacqueline and Lake Germain.

Forestry is the main economic activity in the sector; recreational tourism, second.

The surface of Lake Jacqueline is usually frozen from the beginning of December to the end of March, however the safe circulation on the ice is generally made from mid-December to mid-March.

== Geography ==
The main watersheds near Lake Jacqueline are:

- north side: Rivière aux Écorces North-East, Simard stream, Madeleine stream, Pikauba River;
- east side: Pies stream, Hell stream, Pikauba River, rivière aux Écorces North-East;
- south side: Launière River, Launière lake, Cavée River, Jacques-Cartier North-West River;
- west side: Delphis brook, Joyal brook, rivière aux Écorces du Milieu, rivière aux Écorces North-East, Kane brook, Gravel brook.

Lac Jacqueline has a length of 2.9 kilometres (1.8 mi), a width of 0.75 kilometres (0.47 mi) and an altitude of 791 metres (2,595 ft). This lake is mainly fed by riparian streams, by the outlet (coming from the east) of Lory Lake and by a stream (coming from the southeast). This lake is surrounded by mountains on the east and south sides, whose summits reach 963 metres (3,159 ft) to the northeast, 896 metres (2,940 ft) to the east and 990 metres (3,250 ft) to the south. The dam at the mouth of Jacqueline Lake is located to the northwest, at:

- 4.1 kilometres (2.5 mi) south-east of the confluence of the outlet of Lake Jacqueline and the Rivière aux Écorces North-East;
- 4.6 kilometres (2.9 mi) north-east of Franchère Lake;
- 6.0 kilometres (3.7 mi) north-west of the dam at the mouth of Honorine Lake which is the head lake of the Launière River;
- 7.8 kilometres (4.8 mi) south-west of the course of the Pikauba River;
- 12.2 kilometres (7.6 mi) south-west of route 175;
- 25.1 kilometres (15.6 mi) north-east of the confluence of the Rivière aux Écorces North-East and the Rivière aux Écorces.

From the mouth of Lake Jacqueline, the current follows the course of the rivière aux Écorces North-East consecutively over 42.7 kilometres (26.5 mi) generally west, the course of the rivière aux Écorces on 98.5 kilometres (61.2 mi) generally west, then north, the course of the Pikauba River on 35.0 kilometres (21.7 mi) generally towards the northeast, crosses Kenogami Lake on 17.6 kilometres (10.9 mi) towards the northeast until barrage de Portage-des-Roches, then follows the course of the Chicoutimi River on 26.2 kilometres (16.3 mi) to the east, then the northeast and the course of the Saguenay River on 114.6 kilometres (71.2 mi) east to Tadoussac where it merges with the Saint Lawrence estuary.

== Toponymy ==
The term "Jacqueline" is a first name of French origin.

The toponym "Lac Jacqueline" was formalized on December 5, 1968, by the Commission de toponymie du Québec.

== See also ==
- La Côte-de-Beaupré Regional County Municipality
- Lac-Jacques-Cartier, a TNO
- Saguenay River
- Chicoutimi River
- Kenogami Lake
- Pikauba River
- Rivière aux Écorces
- Rivière aux Écorces North-East
- List of lakes of Canada
