= Hugh Lake =

Lake in Lac-Croche, Quebec, Canada

- Location in Quebec
- Location: Lac-Croche (TNO), La Jacques-Cartier Regional County Municipality, Capitale-Nationale
- Coordinates: 47.70889°N 71.92972°W
- Lake type: Natural
- Primary inflows: (clockwise from the mouth) La décharge du lac Lavoie, rivière Métabetchouane, la décharge des lacs Rocand, Apollon et Esculape, la décharge du second lac Demuth et Demuth, la décharge du lac de la Douve.
- Primary outflows: Métabetchouane River
- Basin countries: Canada
- Max. length: 7.0 km (4.3 mi)
- Max. width: 1.15 km (0.71 mi)
- Surface elevation: 413 m (1,355 ft)

The Hugh Lake is a freshwater body crossed by the Métabetchouane River, in the unorganized territory of Lac-Croche, in the La Jacques-Cartier Regional County Municipality, in the administrative region of Capitale-Nationale, in the province of Quebec, in Canada. This lake is located in the Laurentides Wildlife Reserve.

Lake Hugh is indirectly served by route 155 (connecting La Tuque and Chambord). The forest road R0410 passes north of the lake. A few secondary forest roads serve this area for the purposes of forestry and recreational tourism activities.

Forestry is the main economic activity in the sector; recreational tourism, second.

The surface of Lake Hugh is usually frozen from the beginning of December to the end of March, however safe circulation on the ice is generally done from mid-December to mid-March.

== Geography ==
The main watersheds near Lake Hugh are:

- north side: Canuck stream, Métabetchouane River, Métascouac River, Saint-Henri Lake;
- east side: Petit lac Métascouac, Métascouac River, Métascouac South River, Métabetchouane East River;
- south side: Métabetchouane River, Rivière de la Place, Métabetchouane East River;
- west side: Ventadour Lake.

Lake Hugh has a length of 5.1 kilometres (3.2 mi), a width of 0.9 kilometres (0.56 mi) and an elevation of 424 metres (1,391 ft). This lake is mainly fed by the outlet of Lake Lavoie, Métabetchouane River, the outlet of Lakes Rocand, Apollon and Esculape, the outlet of the second lake Demuth and Demuth, the outlet of Lake Douve. This lake has a narrowing in its middle because of a peninsula attached to the south shore which stretches to the northwest on 0.5 kilometres (0.31 mi) one from the other. The Métabetchouane River crosses this lake to the northwest over its entire length.

The mouth of Hugh Lake is located at the bottom northwest of the lake, at:

- 6.2 kilometres (3.9 mi) south of the road bridge of the forest road R0279 which spans the Métabetchouane River;
- 9.4 kilometres (5.8 mi) east of Ventadour Lake;
- 27.7 kilometres (17.2 mi) south-east of Grand lac Bostonnais;
- 21.1 kilometres (13.1 mi) east of the Canadian National railway.

From the mouth of Lake Hugh, the current follows the course of:

- Métabetchouane River on 116 kilometres (72 mi) generally towards the northwest;
- lac Saint-Jean on 22.25 kilometres (13.83 mi) north-east until la petite Décharge;
- Saguenay River via La Petite Décharge on 172.3 kilometres (107.1 mi) east to Tadoussac where it merges with the Saint Lawrence Estuary.

== Toponymy ==
The toponym "Lake Hugh" was formalized on December 5, 1968, by the Commission de toponymie du Québec.

== Appendices ==
=== Related articles ===
- La Jacques-Cartier Regional County Municipality
- Lac-Croche, a TNO
- Laurentides Wildlife Reserve
- Métabetchouane River
- Lac Saint-Jean
- Saguenay River
- St. Lawrence River
- List of lakes in Canada
