= Métascouac =

Métascouac can refer to:

- Métascouac Lake, lake in Lac-Jacques-Cartier, Quebec, Canada
- Petit lac Métascouac, lake in Lac-Croche, Quebec, Canada
- Métascouac River, a tributary of Métabetchouane River in Quebec, Canada
- Métascouac South River, river in Lac-Croche, Quebec, Canada
