= Métascouac South River =

- Location within Quebec

Location
- Country: Canada
- Province: Quebec
- Region: Capitale-Nationale
- Regional County Municipality: La Côte-de-Beaupré Regional County Municipality, La Jacques-Cartier Regional County Municipality
- Unorganized territory: Lac-Jacques-Cartier Lac-Croche

Physical characteristics
- Source: Lac des Lynx
  - location: Lac-Jacques-Cartier
  - coordinates: 47.71732°N 71.72183°W
  - elevation: 623 m (2,044 ft)
- Mouth: Métascouac River
  - location: Lac-Croche
  - coordinates: 47.69889°N 71.83361°W
  - elevation: 445 m (1,460 ft)
- Length: 14.6 km (9.1 mi)
- Discharge
  - location: Lac-Croche

Basin features
- Tributaries
  - left: (upward from the mouth) Décharge d'un petit lac non identifié, ruisseau non identifié, ruisseau non identifié.
  - right: (upward from the mouth) Décharge du Lac Pois, décharge du lac Lemaine.

The Métascouac South River is a tributary of the eastern bank of the Métascouac River, flowing in the central west part of the Laurentides Wildlife Reserve, in the administrative region of Capitale-Nationale, in the province of Quebec, in Canada. The river flows through the regional county municipalities of:

- La Côte-de-Beaupré Regional County Municipality: in the unorganized territory of Lac-Jacques-Cartier;
- La Jacques-Cartier Regional County Municipality: in the unorganized territory of Lac-Croche.

Forestry is the main economic activity in this valley; recreational tourism, second.

The surface of the Métascouac South River (except the rapids areas) is usually frozen from the end of November to the beginning of April, however the safe circulation on the ice is generally done from mid-December to the end of March.

== Geography ==
The main watersheds near the Métascouac Sud river are:

- north side: Canuck stream, Corneillier lake, rivière aux Écorces;
- east side: rivière aux Écorces North-East, Métabetchouane East River;
- south side: Métabetchouane River, Métabetchouane East River and rivière de la Place;
- west side: Métascouac River, Métabetchouane River, Saint-Henri Lake.

The Métascouac South river has its source at the mouth of Lac des Lynx (length: 2.3 kilometres (1.4 mi); altitude: 623 metres (2,044 ft)). This landlocked lake has a marsh area in the southeast and another in the north. It is fed by the outlet (coming from the south-east) from Lyre lake and the outlet (coming from the north) from an unidentified lake.

From its source (mouth of Lac des Lyns), the course of the South Métascouac River flows over 14.6 kilometres (9.1 mi), with a drop of 178 metres (584 ft) according to the following segments:

- 1.6 kilometres (0.99 mi) towards the west by forming a curve towards the north and crossing Lac des Grements (length: 1.7 kilometres (1.1 mi); altitude: 608 metres (1,995 ft)) over its full length to its mouth;
- 2.9 kilometres (1.8 mi) towards the west by forming a loop towards the south at the end of the segment, up to the outlet (coming from the north) of Lac Lemaine);
- 2.5 kilometres (1.6 mi) south-west, to a stream (coming from the north);
- 1.9 kilometres (1.2 mi) to the south, up to a bend in the river;
- 2.0 kilometres (1.2 mi) westwards, to a bend in the river;
- 2.1 kilometres (1.3 mi) towards the south by forming a loop towards the south-east, then a hook towards the west, up to a bend in the river;
- 1.6 kilometres (0.99 mi) to the west by winding and crossing a marsh zone at the end of the segment.

From the confluence of the Métascouac South river, the current flows over:

- 4.9 kilometres (3.0 mi) towards the south by the course of the Métascouac River;
- 83.9 kilometres (52.1 mi) north along the course of the Métabetchouane River to the south shore of lac Saint-Jean;
- 22.8 kilometres (14.2 mi) towards the northeast by crossing lac Saint-Jean;
- 172.3 kilometres (107.1 mi) towards the east by taking the course of the Saguenay River via la Petite Décharge, until Tadoussac where it merges with the Saint Lawrence estuary.

== Toponymy ==
The toponym Rivière Métascouac Sud was formalized on December 5, 1968, at the Place Names Bank of the Commission de toponymie du Québec.

== See also ==
- St. Lawrence River
- List of rivers of Quebec
