= Métascouac River =

- Location within Quebec

Location
- Country: Canada
- Province: Quebec
- Region: Capitale-Nationale
- Regional County Municipality: La Côte-de-Beaupré Regional County Municipality, La Jacques-Cartier Regional County Municipality
- Unorganized territory: Lac-Jacques-Cartier Lac-Croche

Physical characteristics
- Source: Lac Goulet
  - location: Lac-Jacques-Cartier
  - coordinates: 47.77284°N 71.82907°W
  - elevation: 471 m (1,545 ft)
- Mouth: Petit lac Métascouac (going to Métabetchouane River)
  - location: Lac-Croche
  - coordinates: 47.67472°N 71.83833°W
  - elevation: 439 m (1,440 ft)
- Length: 17.4 km (10.8 mi)
- Discharge
  - location: Lac-Croche

Basin features
- Tributaries
  - left: (upward from the mouth) Métascouac South River, ruisseau Canuck, discharge of lac Blanchette.
  - right: (upward from the mouth) Discharge of lac Dejeté, unidentified stream, discharge of lakes des Néréides, Thétis, Goizel, Berthiaume and Métascouac.

The Métascouac River is a tributary of the east bank of the Métabetchouane River (via the Petit lac Métascouac), flowing in the central west part of the Laurentides Wildlife Reserve, in the administrative region of Capitale-Nationale, in the province of Quebec, in Canada. The course of the river crosses the regional county municipalities of:

- La Côte-de-Beaupré Regional County Municipality: unorganized territory of Lac-Jacques-Cartier;
- La Jacques-Cartier Regional County Municipality: unorganized territory of Lac-Croche.

Forestry is the main economic activity in this valley; recreational tourism, second.

The surface of the Métascouac River (except the rapids zones) is usually frozen from the end of November to the beginning of April, however the safe circulation on the ice is generally done from mid-December to the end of March.

== Geography ==
The main watersheds neighboring the Métascouac River are:

- north side: Métascouac Lake, Berthiaume Lake, Lac aux Écorces, Rivière aux Écorces;
- east side: Canuck stream, rivière aux Écorces North-East, Métascouac South River;
- south side: Petit lac Métascouac, Métabetchouane River, Métabetchouane East River and Rivière de la Place;
- west side: Métabetchouane River, Saint-Henri Lake.

The Métascouac river has its source at the mouth of Lac Goulet (length: 2.0 kilometres (1.2 mi) in the shape of a Y whose mouth (south side) is at the base of the letter; altitude: 471 metres (1,545 ft)). This landlocked lake is fed by: the outlet (coming from the southwest) from the Ocre and Linaigrettes lakes; the outlet (coming from the west) of Lac Chaillot; the outlet (coming from the northwest) from Lac de la Marge; the outlet (coming from the north-east) from Affatt Lake.

From its source (mouth of Lac Goulet), the course of the Métascouac river flows over 17.4 kilometres (10.8 mi), with a drop of 32 metres (105 ft) according to the following segments:

- 0.9 kilometres (0.56 mi) south-east, to the outlet (coming from the west) of Lac Blanchette;
- 4.2 kilometres (2.6 mi) towards the south in a deep valley, until the discharge (coming from the west) of the lakes of Néréides, Thétis, Goizel, Berthiaume and Métascouac;
- 4.5 kilometres (2.8 mi) towards the south-east, in particular by crossing Lake Montreuil (altitude: 441 metres (1,447 ft)) on 0.8 kilometres (0.50 mi), up to Canuck brook (coming from the north);
- 2.9 kilometres (1.8 mi) towards the south-east, meandering at the end of the segment crossing a marsh zone, until the confluence of the Métascouac South River (coming from the east);
- 4.9 kilometres (3.0 mi) to the south by crossing small areas of marshland and forming some serpentines, then crossing Lake Ouellette (altitude: 439 metres (1,440 ft)) on 1.5 kilometres (0.93 mi), and continuing to the mouth of the river.

From the confluence of the Métascouac river, the current flows over:

- 3.8 kilometres (2.4 mi) southwards crossing Petit lac Métascouac;
- 83.9 kilometres (52.1 mi) north along the course of the Métabetchouane River to the south shore of lac Saint-Jean;
- 22.8 kilometres (14.2 mi) towards the northeast by crossing lac Saint-Jean;
- 172.3 kilometres (107.1 mi) towards the east by taking the course of the Saguenay River via la Petite Décharge, until Tadoussac where it merges with the Saint Lawrence estuary.

== Toponymy ==
The toponym "rivière Métascouac" was formalized on December 5, 1968, at the Place Names Bank of the Commission de toponymie du Québec.

== See also ==
- St. Lawrence River
- List of rivers of Quebec
