= Trompeuse River =

River in Lac-Jacques-Cartier, Quebec, Canada

- Location within Quebec

Location
- Country: Canada
- Province: Quebec
- Region: Saguenay-Lac-Saint-Jean
- Regional County Municipality: Lac-Saint-Jean-Est Regional County Municipality
- Unorganized territory: Lac-Jacques-Cartier

Physical characteristics
- Source: Lac Trompeur
  - location: Lac-Jacques-Cartier
  - coordinates: 47.91121°N 71.58537°W
  - elevation: 612 m (2,008 ft)
- Mouth: Rivière aux Écorces
  - location: Lac-Jacques-Cartier
  - coordinates: 47.83305°N 71.68584°W
  - elevation: 398 m (1,306 ft)
- Length: 17.5 km (10.9 mi)
- Discharge
  - location: Lac-Jacques-Cartier

Basin features
- Tributaries
  - left: (from the mouth) Ruisseau Cloutier, discharge of lakes Mafflé and du Festin, ruisseau Fortin.
  - right: (from the mouth) Discharge of lac Festonné, discharge of lac du Chasseur.

The Rivière Trompeuse is a tributary of the rivière aux Écorces, flowing in the unorganized territory of Lac-Jacques-Cartier, in the La Côte-de-Beaupré Regional County Municipality, in the administrative region of Capitale-Nationale, in the province of Quebec, in Canada. The course of the Trompeuse River crosses the northwestern part of the Laurentides Wildlife Reserve.

The Trompeuse river valley is located between route 169 connecting Quebec (city) to Chicoutimi and route 155 connecting La Tuque to Chambord. This valley is also served by some secondary forest roads of the Laurentides Wildlife Reserve, especially for forestry and recreational tourism activities.

Forestry is the main economic activity in this valley; recreational tourism, second. On the rivière aux Écorces, downstream from the confluence of the Trompeuse river and at the head of the lac aux Écorces des spawning grounds are recognized as one of the best spring fishing sites in the territory of the Laurentides Wildlife Reserve.

The surface of the Trompeuse River is usually frozen from the beginning of December to the end of March, however the safe circulation on the ice is generally made from mid-December to mid-March.

== Geography ==
The main watersheds neighboring the Trompeuse River are:

- north side: lac aux Écorces, lac à la Culotte, Pikauba River, rivière aux canots, Panache Lake;
- east side: Fortin stream, Cloutier stream, Huit lake, Charland lake, rivière aux Canots;
- south side: Araigne brook, Gros-Jos brook, rivière aux Écorces North-East, rivière aux Écorces,
- west side: rivière aux Écorces, Lac Érin, Lac Samson, Lac Monbrion, lac aux Écorces, Salvail stream.

The Trompeuse River originates at Trompeur Lake (length: 1.7 kilometres (1.1 mi); altitude: 612 metres (2,008 ft)) in a forest area in the Laurentides Wildlife Reserve. This source is located at:

- 2.2 kilometres (1.4 mi) east of Lac du Chasseur;
- 5.1 kilometres (3.2 mi) south-east of a curve in the course of the rivière aux Canots;
- 8.5 kilometres (5.3 mi) east of Lac à la Culotte;
- 10.6 kilometres (6.6 mi) north-east of lac aux Écorces which is crossed by the rivière aux Écorces;
- 11.5 kilometres (7.1 mi) north-west of the confluence of the Rivière Trompeuse and rivière aux Écorces;
- 9.7 kilometres (6.0 mi) north-west of the course of the rivière aux Écorces North-East;
- 14.5 kilometres (9.0 mi) of the hamlet Mont-Apica where the route 169 passes.

From its source (Trompeur Lake), the Trompeuse River flows over 17.5 kilometres (10.9 mi) with a drop of 214 metres (702 ft) entirely in the forest zone, according to the following segments:

- 1.0 kilometre (0.62 mi) towards the south in particular by crossing Lake Tiffaut (length: 0.9 kilometres (0.56 mi); altitude: 612 metres (2,008 ft)) over its full length, up to its mouth. Note: Lac Tiffaut receives the outlet (coming from the east) from Lac Rousseau;
- 0.5 kilometres (0.31 mi) south to Fortin stream (coming from the east);
- 2.7 kilometres (1.7 mi) first towards the west, towards the northwest, then towards the west by crossing an area of marsh, until the discharge (coming from the north) of the lake of Chasseur;
- 2.4 kilometres (1.5 mi) first towards the southwest by crossing a marsh area at the start of the segment, then towards the south in particular by crossing Second Lake Thivierge (length: 0.5 kilometres (0.31 mi); altitude: 548 metres (1,798 ft)), then Thivierge Lake (length: 0.9 kilometres (0.56 mi); altitude: 545 metres (1,788 ft)) on 0.7 kilometres (0.43 mi), to the mouth of the latter;
- 2.4 kilometres (1.5 mi) south, to Cloutier stream (coming from the east);
- 8.5 kilometres (5.3 mi) towards the south by forming a loop towards the west and collecting around twenty streams, to its mouth.

The Trompeuse river flows on the northeast bank of the rivière aux Canots. This confluence is located at:

- 1.9 kilometres (1.2 mi) north-east of Lac Érin;
- 5.1 kilometres (3.2 mi) south-east of lac aux Écorces;
- 8.0 kilometres (5.0 mi) east of Métascouac Lake;
- 19.3 kilometres (12.0 mi) north-east of a curve of the Métabetchouane River;
- 24.9 kilometres (15.5 mi) south-west of route 169;
- 52.2 kilometres (32.4 mi) south of the confluence of the Pikauba River and the rivière aux Écorces;
- 57.6 kilometres (35.8 mi) south-east of the confluence of the Pikauba River and Kenogami Lake;
- 80.5 kilometres (50.0 mi) southwest of the confluence of the Chicoutimi River and the Saguenay River in the Chicoutimi sector of the city of Saguenay (city).

From the mouth of the Trompeuse river, the current successively follows the course of the rivière aux Écorces on 52.8 kilometres (32.8 mi) generally towards the north, the course of the Pikauba River on 10.6 kilometres (6.6 mi) generally to the north, crosses Kenogami Lake on 17.6 kilometres (10.9 mi) north-east to barrage de Portage-des-Roches, then follows the course of the Chicoutimi River on 26.2 kilometres (16.3 mi) towards the east, then the northeast and the course of the Saguenay river on 114.6 kilometres (71.2 mi) towards the east until Tadoussac where it merges with the Saint Lawrence estuary.

== Toponymy ==
The toponym “Rivière Trompeuse” appears on a 1928 map. Two theses can explain the meaning of this toponym:

- According to the first thesis, this toponym was attributed by the fact that the body of water at its confluence, generated by the widening of the river, comprising five islands, leads to confuse the discharge of the Trompeuse river and the main course de la rivière aux Écorces. This body of water also receives the Spider Creek (coming from the east).
- According to the second thesis, when going up the river upstream of Second Thivierge Lake, navigators arriving at a marsh area (located on the east side of the watercourse), confuse the discharge (coming from the north) of Lac du Chasseur, which is wider, and the outlet (coming from the east) from Trompeur and Tiffaut lakes. This confusion is accentuated in this place by the presence of an island on the course of the outlet of Lac Trompeur, in the marsh area.

The toponym “Rivière Trompeuse” was formalized on December 5, 1968, at the Place Names Bank of the Commission de toponymie du Québec.

=== See also ===
- List of rivers of Quebec
