= Franchère Lake =

Fresh water body in Quebec, Canada

- Location in Quebec
- Location: Lac-Jacques-Cartier (TNO), La Côte-de-Beaupré Regional County Municipality, Capitale-Nationale, Quebec, Canada
- Coordinates: 47.73528°N 71.44389°W
- Lake type: Natural
- Primary inflows: Rivière aux Écorces du Milieu, discharge of lac Ballon.
- Primary outflows: Rivière aux Écorces du Milieu
- Basin countries: Canada
- Max. length: 2.7 km (1.7 mi)
- Max. width: 0.9 km (0.56 mi)
- Surface elevation: 803 m (2,635 ft)

The Franchère Lake (French: Lac Franchère) is a fresh water body located in the head zone of the rivière aux Écorces du Milieu, in the unorganized territory of Lac-Jacques-Cartier, in the La Côte-de-Beaupré Regional County Municipality, in the administrative region of Capitale-Nationale, in Quebec, Canada. Lac Franchère is part of the Laurentides Wildlife Reserve.

The area around the lake is served by secondary forest roads for forestry and recreational tourism activities. Forestry is the main economic activity in the sector; recreational tourism, second.

The surface of Lac Franchère is usually frozen from the beginning of December to the end of March, however the safe circulation on the ice is generally done from mid-December to mid-March.

== Geography ==
The main watersheds near Lac Franchère are:

- north side: rivière aux Écorces North-East, Delphis stream;
- east side: Honorine River, Jacques-Cartier River;
- south side: rivière aux Écorces du Milieu, rivière aux Écorces;
- west side: rivière aux Écorces du Milieu, Kane stream.

Lac Franchère has a length of 2.7 kilometres (1.7 mi), a width of 0.9 kilometres (0.56 mi) and an altitude of 803 metres (2,635 ft). This lake is mainly supplied by the outlet of Lac Ballon, as well as the outlet of Lakes Day and Germain. The mouth of Lac Franchère is located at:

- 16.5 kilometres (10.3 mi) north-east of the confluence of the rivière aux Écorces du Milieu and the rivière aux Écorces;
- 66.7 kilometres (41.4 mi) south-east of the mouth of the Pikauba River (confluence with the Kenogami Lake);
- 18.9 kilometres (11.7 mi) north-west of Jacques-Cartier Lake.

From the mouth of Lac Franchère, the current follows the course of:

- the rivière aux Écorces du Milieu on 24.7 kilometres (15.3 mi) generally towards the southwest;
- the rivière aux Écorces on 98.5 kilometres (61.2 mi) generally towards the northeast;
- the Pikauba River on 35.0 kilometres (21.7 mi) generally towards the northeast;
- the Kenogami Lake on 17.6 kilometres (10.9 mi) towards the northeast to barrage de Portage-des-Roches;
- the Chicoutimi River on 26.2 kilometres (16.3 mi) to the east, then the northeast;
- the Saguenay River on 114.6 kilometres (71.2 mi) eastward to Tadoussac where it merges with the Saint Lawrence estuary.

== Toponymy ==
The toponym Lac Franchère was formalized on December 5, 1968, by the Commission de toponymie du Québec.
