= Rivière aux Écorces =

Rivière aux Écorces (English: Bark River) may refer to:

- Rivière aux Écorces (Pikauba River), a tributary of the Pikauba River, in Saguenay-Lac-Saint-Jean, Quebec, Canada
- Rivière aux Écorces North-East, a tributary of the rivière aux Écorces, in Lac-Jacques-Cartier, La Côte-de-Beaupré Regional County Municipality, Capitale-Nationale, Quebec, Canada
- Rivière aux Écorces du Milieu, a tributary of the rivière aux Écorces, in Lac-Jacques-Cartier, La Côte-de-Beaupré Regional County Municipality, Capitale-Nationale, Quebec, Canada
