= Rivière aux Écorces du Milieu =

- Location within Quebec

Location
- Country: Canada
- Province: Quebec
- Region: Saguenay-Lac-Saint-Jean
- Regional County Municipality: La Côte-de-Beaupré Regional County Municipality
- Unorganized territory: Lac-Jacques-Cartier

Physical characteristics
- Source: Lac Chavigny
  - location: Lac-Jacques-Cartier
  - coordinates: 47.72686°N 71.40745°W
  - elevation: 824 m (2,703 ft)
- Mouth: Rivière aux Écorces
  - location: Lac-Jacques-Cartier
  - coordinates: 47.71472°N 71.65945°W
  - elevation: 564 m (1,850 ft)
- Length: 29.3 km (18.2 mi)
- Discharge
  - location: Lac-Jacques-Cartier

Basin features
- Tributaries
  - left: (from the mouth) Décharge du lac de la Bicoque et du lac de la Bibecière, ruisseau Chaperon, décharge du lac Monette, ruisseau Gravel, décharge du ruisseau Dei, décharge du lac Bourget, décharge du lac Cithare.
  - right: (from the mouth) Décharge du lac Sénécal, décharge du lac Brison, décharge des lacs Marcelin, François et Prune, décharge du lac Germain et du lac du Brouillard.

The rivière aux Écorces du Milieu is a tributary of the rivière aux Écorces, flowing in the unorganized territories of Lac-Jacques-Cartier, the La Côte-de-Beaupré Regional County Municipality, in the administrative region of Capitale-Nationale, in the province from Quebec, to Canada. The course of the Rivière aux Écorces du Milieu crosses the western part of the Laurentides Wildlife Reserve.

The valley of the Rivière aux Écorces du Milieu is served indirectly by the route 169 and directly by the forest road R0261 which goes up the valley of the rivière aux Écorces and the Rivière aux Écorces du Milieu. This valley is also served by some secondary forest roads, especially for forestry and recreational tourism activities.

Forestry is the main economic activity in this valley; recreational tourism, second.

The surface of the Rivière aux Écorces du Milieu is usually frozen from the beginning of December to the end of March, however safe circulation on the ice is generally done from mid-December to mid-March.

== Geography ==
The main watersheds neighboring the Rivière aux Écorces du Milieu are:

- north side: Lac Frenette, Rivière aux Écorces, Trompeuse River, rivière aux Écorces North-East, Lake Paris;
- east side: Jacqueline Lake, Pikauba River, Pikauba Lake, lac des Pas Perdus;
- south side: Rivière aux Écorces, Emures lake, Gratia stream, Métabetchouane East River;
- west side: rivière aux Écorces, Eugène lake, Corneillier lake, Métascouac River.

The rivière aux Écorces du Milieu rises at Lake Chavigny (length: 2.5 kilometres (1.6 mi); altitude: 824 metres (2,703 ft)) in a forest area in the Laurentides Wildlife Reserve. This source is located at:

- 1.3 kilometres (0.81 mi) east of Lake Germain;
- 2.5 kilometres (1.6 mi) east of Franchère Lake;
- 5.7 kilometres (3.5 mi) west of the mouth of the head lake of Launière River;
- 15 kilometres (9.3 mi) south-west of the Pikauba River;
- 16.0 kilometres (9.9 mi) south-west of the junction of route 169 and route 175;
- 26.5 kilometres (16.5 mi) south-east of the summit of the center of the hamlet Mont-Apica;
- 18.9 kilometres (11.7 mi) north-east of the confluence of the middle Écorces river and the Écorces river.

From its source (Petit lac Vézina), the rivière aux Écorces du Milieu flows over 29.3 kilometres (18.2 mi) with a drop of 260 metres (850 ft) entirely in the forest zone, according to the following segments:

Upper course of the rivière aux Écorces du Milieu (segment of 4.6 kilometres (2.9 mi))

- 1.2 kilometres (0.75 mi) southwards crossing Petit Lac Chavigny (altitude: 822 metres (2,697 ft)), up to the outlet (coming from the east) of Lake Zither;
- 2.8 kilometres (1.7 mi) towards the west by forming a loop towards the south, then a curve towards the north in the marsh zone, and crossing Day Lake (length: 0.6 kilometres (0.37 mi); altitude: 811 metres (2,661 ft)) over its full length, to its mouth. Note: Day Lake receives the discharge from Lake Germain and Lake Brouillard on the north side;
- 0.6 kilometres (0.37 mi) towards the southwest crossing for about 200 metres (660 ft) the southern part of Lac Franchère (length: 2.8 kilometres (1.7 mi); altitude: 803 metres (2,635 ft)), to its mouth;

Middle course of the rivière aux Écorces du Milieu (segment of 13.9 kilometres (8.6 mi))

- 2.8 kilometres (1.7 mi) to the west by crossing two series of rapids, then by forming a curve towards the north by crossing Lake Arteau (altitude: 788 metres (2,585 ft)) formed by a widening of the river, up to the outlet (coming from the south) of Lac Bourget;
- 4.0 kilometres (2.5 mi) to the west, forming a curve towards the north, bypassing a mountain whose summit reaches 874 metres (2,867 ft), up to Dei stream (coming from the south- East);
- 0.8 kilometres (0.50 mi) towards the west by forming a loop towards the north around an island, up to Gravel stream (coming from the southeast);
- 2.1 kilometres (1.3 mi) towards the west by forming a curve towards the north crossing a marsh zone, up to the outlet (coming from the south) of Lac Monette;
- 4.2 kilometres (2.6 mi) to the west, forming a curve to the north, then a large curve to the south to go around a mountain whose summit reaches 834 metres (2,736 ft), and crossing over a hundred meters the southern part of Lake Sénécal (length: 0.9 kilometres (0.56 mi); altitude: 703 metres (2,306 ft)) to its mouth;

Lower course of the rivière aux Écorces du Milieu (segment of 10.8 kilometres (6.7 mi))

- 2.5 kilometres (1.6 mi) south-west in a deep valley, up to Chaperon stream (coming from the south-east);
- 2.3 kilometres (1.4 mi) towards the northwest by forming a curve towards the south, then passing on the northeast side of a mountain whose summit reaches 696 metres (2,283 ft);
- 2.6 kilometres (1.6 mi) south-west, up to a bend in the river;
- 3.4 kilometres (2.1 mi) towards the south by forming a curve towards the west in the marsh zone, forming a loop towards the south, curving towards the west, forming another loop towards the west, then towards the south, to its mouth.

The “rivière aux Écorces du Milieu” flows on the northeast bank of the rivière aux Écorces. This confluence is located at:

- 2.7 kilometres (1.7 mi) south of Lac Frenette;
- 8.8 kilometres (5.5 mi) east of the course of the Métascouac River;
- 8.9 kilometres (5.5 mi) east of Corneillier Lake;
- 18.1 kilometres (11.2 mi) south-east of lac aux Écorces;
- 64.5 kilometres (40.1 mi) south-east of the confluence of the Pikauba River and the rivière aux Écorces;
- 69.7 kilometres (43.3 mi) south-east of the confluence of the Pikauba River and Kenogami Lake;
- 90.7 kilometres (56.4 mi) south of the confluence of the Chicoutimi River and the Saguenay River in the Chicoutimi sector of the city of Saguenay (city).

From the mouth of the rivière aux Écorces du Milieu, the current successively follows the course of the rivière aux Écorces on 98.5 kilometres (61.2 mi) generally north, the course of the Pikauba River on 10.6 kilometres (6.6 mi) generally towards the north, crosses Kenogami Lake on 17.6 kilometres (10.9 mi) towards the northeast until barrage de Portage-des-Roches, then follows the course of the Chicoutimi River on 26.2 kilometres (16.3 mi) to the east, then the northeast and the course of the Saguenay river on 114.6 kilometres (71.2 mi) east to Tadoussac where it merges with the Saint Lawrence estuary.

== Toponymy ==
The toponym “Rivière aux Écorces du Milieu” was formalized on December 5, 1968, at the Place Names Bank of the Commission de toponymie du Québec.

== See also ==
- List of rivers of Quebec
