= De La Place =

De La Place may refer to:

== Surnames ==
- Pierre de la Place (c. 1520–1572), French Protestant magistrate, writer and philosopher;
- Josué de la Place (v. 1596–1655), French Protestant theologian;
- Frédérick Deschamps de La Place (17th century), French governor of Île de la Tortue;
- Pierre-Antoine de La Place (1707–1793), French writer and dramatist;
- Jean Baptiste Meusnier de la Place (1754–1793), surveyor, French general engineer.

== Names ==
- Rivière de la Place, a tributary of the Métabetchouane River, in the Laurentides Wildlife Reserve, in the Capitale-Nationale, in Quebec, in Canada.
