= Saint-Henri Lake =

Lake in Lac-Croche, Quebec, Canada

- Location in Quebec
- Location: Lac-Croche (TNO), La Jacques-Cartier Regional County Municipality, Capitale-Nationale
- Coordinates: 47.70889°N 71.92972°W
- Lake type: Natural
- Primary inflows: (clockwise from the mouth) Métabetchouane River (coming from the south-east via Hugh Lake), des ruisseaux riverains, la décharge du lac Desève, la décharge du lac Gagné et la décharge du lac Roublard.
- Primary outflows: Métabetchouane River
- Basin countries: Canada
- Max. length: 7.0 km (4.3 mi)
- Max. width: 1.15 km (0.71 mi)
- Surface elevation: 413 m (1,355 ft)

The lac Saint-Henri is a freshwater body crossed by the Métabetchouane River, in the unorganized territory of Lac-Croche, in the La Jacques-Cartier Regional County Municipality, in the administrative region of Capitale-Nationale, in the province of Quebec, in Canada. This lake is located in the Laurentides Wildlife Reserve.

Lac Saint-Henri is indirectly served by the route 155 (connecting La Tuque and Chambord). The forest road R0410 passes north of the lake. A few secondary forest roads serve this area for the purposes of forestry and recreational tourism activities.

Forestry is the main economic activity in the sector; recreational tourism, second.

The surface of Lake Saint-Henri is usually frozen from the beginning of December to the end of March, however the safe circulation on the ice is generally made from mid-December to mid-March.

== Geography ==
The main watersheds near Lake Saint-Henri are:

- north side: Métabetchouane River, Métascouac Lake, Métabetchouane Lake, Moncouche River;
- east side: Corneillier Lake, Frenette Lake, Métascouac River, Métascouac South River, Métabetchouane East River, Jacques-Cartier Lake, Jacques-Cartier River;
- south side: rivière de la Place, Métabetchouane River, Métabetchouane East River;
- west side: Ventadour Lake, Lescarbot Lake, Grand Bostonnais River, Aberdeen River.

Lac Saint-Henri has a length of 7.0 kilometres (4.3 mi), a width of 1.15 kilometres (0.71 mi) and an altitude of 413 metres (1,355 ft). This lake is mainly fed by the outlet of the Métabetchouane River (coming from the southeast by Lake Hugh), riparian streams, the outlet of Lake Desève, the outlet of Lake Gagné and the outlet of Lake Roublard. This lake has a narrowing in the middle because of two peninsulas which approximates approximately 170 metres (560 ft) one from the other. The Métabetchouane River crosses this lake for 6.1 kilometres (3.8 mi) to the north.

The mouth of Lac Saint-Henri is located at the far north end of the lake, at:

- 0.4 kilometres (0.25 mi) south of the road bridge of the forest road R0410;
- 8.9 kilometres (5.5 mi) east of Ventadour Lake;
- 13.3 kilometres (8.3 mi) east of Lescarbot Lake;
- 4.6 kilometres (2.9 mi) west of the course of the Métascouac River;
- 22.1 kilometres (13.7 mi) east of the Canadian National railway;
- 20.2 kilometres (12.6 mi) south-west of lac aux Écorces;
- 28.5 kilometres (17.7 mi) north-east of the center of the village of lac-Édouard;
- 75.8 kilometres (47.1 mi) south-east of the mouth of the Métabetchouane River, on the south shore of lac Saint-Jean.

From the mouth of Lac Saint-Henri, the current follows the course of:

- Métabetchouane River on 109.8 kilometres (68.2 mi) generally towards the northwest;
- lac Saint-Jean on 22.25 kilometres (13.83 mi) north-east until la petite Décharge;
- Saguenay River via the Petite Décharge on 172.3 kilometres (107.1 mi) eastwards to Tadoussac where it merges with the Saint Lawrence estuary.

== Toponymy ==
The toponym "Lac Saint-Henri" was formalized on December 5, 1968, by the Commission de toponymie du Québec.

=== See also ===
- List of lakes of Canada
