= Lac aux Rognons (Lac-Croche) =

Lake in Lac-Croche, Quebec, Canada

- Location in Quebec
- Location: Lac-Croche, La Jacques-Cartier, Capitale-Nationale, Québec, Canada
- Coordinates: 47.51417°N 71.73361°W
- Lake type: Natural
- Primary inflows: (clockwise from the mouth) Décharge des lacs Narval, Serré et Coquille, décharge des lacs Ombrelle et Chalifoux, Métabetchouane River, décharge d'un lac non identifié, décharge des lacs Fauve, Lebrun, Magnan, Mutrecy, Baribeau et Petit lac Baribeau.
- Primary outflows: Métabetchouane River
- Basin countries: Canada
- Max. length: 5.0 km (3.1 mi)
- Max. width: 0.9 km (0.56 mi)
- Surface elevation: 589 m (1,932 ft)

The Lac aux Rognons is crossed to the northwest by the Métabetchouane River, in the unorganized territory of Lac-Croche, in the La Jacques-Cartier Regional County Municipality, in the administrative region of Capitale-Nationale, in the province of Quebec, in Canada.

Lac aux Rognons is located in the west central part of the Laurentides Wildlife Reserve.

This small valley is served by a few secondary roads serving this area for the needs of forestry, recreational tourism activities.

Forestry is the main economic activity in the sector; recreational tourism, second.

The surface of "Lac aux Rognons" is usually frozen from the beginning of December to the end of March, however safe circulation on the ice is generally done from mid-December to mid-March.

== Geography ==
The main watersheds near Lac aux Rognons are:

- north side: rivière de la Place, F.-X.-Lemieux Lake;
- east side: Métabetchouane River;
- south side: Métabetchouane River;
- west side: Métabetchouane River, Rivière à Moïse.

Lac aux Rognons has a length of 5.0 kilometres (3.1 mi), a width of 0.9 kilometres (0.56 mi) and an altitude of 589 metres (1,932 ft). This lake takes the shape of a large U because of a peninsula attached to the West shore, which stretches in the lake to the southeast. The Métabetchouane River crosses this lake to the north on 3.7 kilometres (2.3 mi).

This lake is mainly fed by the outlet (coming from the south) of the Métabetchouane River.

From the mouth of Lac aux Rognons, the current flows in the following segments:

- 146.9 kilometres (91.3 mi) northwards following the current of the Métabetchouane River, to the south shore of lac Saint-Jean;
- 22.8 kilometres (14.2 mi) towards the northeast by crossing lac Saint-Jean;
- 172.3 kilometres (107.1 mi) towards the east by following the course of the Saguenay River via La Petite Décharge on 172.3 kilometres (107.1 mi) to Tadoussac where it merges with the Saint Lawrence estuary.

== Toponymy ==
Lac aux Rognons is part of the upper course of the Métabetchouane river, at the northern limit of the MRC of La Jacques-Cartier Regional County Municipality. The shape of the lake in U roughly associates the shape of a kidney of a butchered beast.

This lake is reported in a surveyor E. Casgrain in 1887.

In the prehistory of this region, this lake proved to be an inescapable milestone of the waterways used by the Amerindians between the St. Lawrence Valley and Lac Saint-Jean. The legendary 17th century Jesuit trail turned out to be the Innu winter road; the missionaries passed by the Lac aux Rognons to go to Lac Saint-Jean and Hudson Bay. The Huron Wendats who settled in the region of Quebec (city) in the middle of the 17th century, had to break into the natural hunting and fishing territories of other Aboriginal nations. The Algonquins agreed to entrench themselves west of the Batiscan River. In addition, the Innu lost interest in the region north of Quebec (city), where game was declining due to the presence of French settlers. Located on the borders of the Innu and Wendat territories, Lac aux Rognons was frequented by both groups. In the 19th century, the Gros-Louis Wendate family, to whom the clan had allocated this territory, still maintained a camp on the banks of Lac aux Rognons; however, this family gradually had to abandon it after the creation in 1895 of the Parc des Laurentides, which later became the Laurentides Wildlife Reserve.

The Quebec toponymy includes several geographic entities designated by the specific element Rognon, in particular a lake and an important river which feed the Batiscan River.

The toponym "lac aux Rognons" was formalized on December 5, 1968, by the Commission de toponymie du Québec.

== See also ==
- List of lakes of Canada
