= Métascouac Lake =

Lake in Quebec, Canada

- Location in Quebec
- Location: Lac-Jacques-Cartier, La Côte-de-Beaupré Regional County Municipality
- Coordinates: 47.8375°N 71.83833°W
- Lake type: Natural
- Primary inflows: (Clockwise from the mouth) Décharge d’un ensemble de lacs dont Durocher, des Mûres, Taillefer et Themers, décharge des lacs Isabelle et Flynn, décharge du lac Tomochiche et du lac Sérigny, décharge du lac Lescarbeau.
- Primary outflows: Métascouac River
- Basin countries: Canada
- Max. length: 8.5 km (5.3 mi)
- Max. width: 3.2 km (2.0 mi)
- Surface elevation: 471 m (1,545 ft)

The lac Métascouac is a fresh body of water crossed by the Métascouac River, in the unorganized territory of Lac-Jacques-Cartier, in the La Côte-de-Beaupré Regional County Municipality, in the administrative region of Capitale-Nationale, in the province of Quebec, in Canada. Lac Métascouac is part of the Laurentides Wildlife Reserve.

The area around the lake is served indirectly by the route 169 (connecting Quebec (city) to Alma) and by the route 155 (connecting La Tuque and Chambord). A few secondary forest roads serve this area for the purposes of forestry and recreational tourism activities.

Forestry is the main economic activity in the sector; recreational tourism, second.

The surface of Lac Métascouac is usually frozen from the beginning of December to the end of March, however the safe circulation on the ice is generally made from mid-December to mid-March.

== Geography ==
The main watersheds near Lac Métascouac are:

- north side: Lac Sérigny, Lac de la Liberté, Lac aux Écorces, Rivière aux Écorces, Carbonneau Lake;
- east side: Lac Tomachiche, Lac Samson, Lac Citoleux, Lac de la Montagne, Lac Érin, rivière aux Écorces;
- south side: Berthiaume Lake, lac des Néréides, Métascouac River, Métabetchouane River;
- west side: Berthiaume Lake, Lac aux Montagnais, Métabetchouane River, Long stream.

Lac Métascouac has a length of 8.5 km (5.3 mi), a width of 3.2 km (2.0 mi) and an altitude of 471 m (1,545 ft). This lake is mainly fed by the discharge of a set of lakes including Durocher, des Mûres, Taillefer and Themers, discharge from Isabelle and Flynn lakes, discharge from Lake Tomochiche and Lake Sérigny, discharge from Lake Lescarbeau. A dam was erected at the mouth of Lac Métascouac which is located on the west shore, at:

- 2.9 km (1.8 mi) south-east of Lac aux Montagnais;
- 8.8 km (5.5 mi) south-west of Lac aux Écorces;
- 39.1 km (24.3 mi) south-east of lac des Commissaires;
- 24.9 km (15.5 mi) east of the village of Van Bruyssel located along the Canadian National railway;
- 38.4 km (23.9 mi) north-east of the center of the village of Lac-Édouard;
- 63.8 km (39.6 mi) south-east of lac Saint-Jean.

From the mouth of Lac Métascouac, the current follows the course of:

- Métascouac River on generally towards the south;
- Petit lac Métascouac on 3.7 km (2.3 mi) towards the south;
- Métabetchouane River on 126.6 km (78.7 mi) generally towards the northeast;
- Lac Saint-Jean on 22.25 km (13.83 mi) north-east until la Petite Décharge;
- Saguenay River via the la Petite Décharge on 172.3 m (565 ft) eastwards to Tadoussac where it merges with the Saint Lawrence estuary.

== Toponymy ==
The term “Métascouac” would a priori have been attributed to the river into which Lac Métascouac discharges. Surveyor Frederic William Blaiklock explored in 1847 the territory between Stoneham, near Quebec (city), and Métabetchouan–Lac-à-la-Croix, at Lac-Saint-Jean, with a view to the possible construction of a road connecting these two points. He identifies and describes this watercourse under the name of “Rivière Metasquiac”. The toponym appeared in 1870 in the form "Grand L. Metasquéag" on the "Map of the province of Quebec" by Eugène Taché. Surveyor Henry O'Sullivan explored the site in 1892 and described the lake as one of the most beautiful in the entire Métabetchouane river basin, dotted with green islands and bordered on each side by gently sloping hills.

Two distinct sources attributed to the Oblate missionary and philologist Georges Lemoine attribute different meanings to the toponym. The first makes “Métascouac” come from the Innu words “matau” and “iskwewak” which we translate by “lac aux belles femmes”, however, casting some doubt as to this interpretation. The second relates to it the meaning of "where there is only green wood". However, when he published his "Dictionnaire montagnais-français" in 1901, Father Lemoine himself gave the toponym the meaning of "place where three streams meet". This etymology seems the most plausible given the appearance of the surrounding places. The Métascouac River, into which the lake flows, joins in fact, some twenty kilometers below, with the Métabetchouane River. This junction is made at a right angle, in the shape of a T, so that at this precise place, one has the impression of observing three watercourses which join.

The toponym "Lac Métascouac" was formalized on December 5, 1968, by the Commission de toponymie du Québec.

== See also ==
- St. Lawrence River
- List of lakes of Canada
