= F.-X.-Lemieux Lake =

Lake in Quebec, Canada

F.X.-Lemieux Lake
- Location in Quebec
- Location: Lac-Croche, MRC La Jacques-Cartier, Capitale-Nationale, Québec, Canada
- Coordinates: 47.54083°N 71.664171°W
- Lake type: Natural
- Primary inflows: (clockwise from the mouth) Décharge des lacs Raoul, Melchior et Laquerre, décharge du lac Bizette.
- Primary outflows: Métabetchouane River
- Basin countries: Canada
- Max. length: 4.7 km (2.9 mi)
- Max. width: 0.9 km (0.56 mi)
- Surface elevation: 674 m (2,211 ft)

The Lac F.X.-Lemieux is located in the unorganized territory of Lac-Croche, in the La Jacques-Cartier Regional County Municipality, in the administrative region of Capitale-Nationale, in the province of Quebec, in Canada.

F.X.-Lemieux is located in the west central part of the Laurentides Wildlife Reserve.

This small valley is served by a few secondary roads serving this area for the needs of forestry, recreational tourism activities.

Forestry is the main economic activity in the sector; recreational tourism, second.

The surface of Lac F.X.-Lemieux is usually frozen from the beginning of December to the end of March, however safe circulation on the ice is generally done from mid-December to mid-March.

== Geography ==
The main lakes near Lake F.-X.-Lemieux are:

- Lac aux Rognons, located 4.5 kilometres (2.8 mi) to the southeast, which is crossed by the Métabetchouane River;
- Henri-Mercier Lake, located 4.3 kilometres (2.7 mi) to the southeast;
- Laquerre Lake, located 3.5 kilometres (2.2 mi) to the northeast.

Lake F.-X.-Lemieux has a length of 4.7 kilometres (2.9 mi), a width of 0.9 kilometres (0.56 mi) and its surface is at an altitude of 674 metres (2,211 ft). This lake encased between the mountains has an atypical shape resembling a long-tailed beaver. This misshapen lake has a bay stretching east on 2.5 kilometres (1.6 mi) and a dozen islands. A diamond-shaped peninsula is attached to the north shore and stretches south to the center of the lake.

Lake F.-X.-Lemieux receives the waters:

- from the northeast by the discharge of a set of lakes including Laquerre, Raoul and Fa;
- from the north, by the outlet of Lake Bizette.

From the mouth of Lake F.-X.-Lemieux, located on the south shore in the middle of the lake, the current descends on first towards the south following the course of the discharge from the lake crossing the Cluse, Verneuil, Oblong and Minime lakes. Then the current veers westwards zigzagging to go to flow on the east bank of the lac aux Rognons which is crossed by the Métabetchouane River. From there, the current generally goes north following on 151.9 kilometres (94.4 mi) the course of the Métabetchouane River. From the mouth of the Métabetchouane river on the south shore of Lac Saint-Jean, the current crosses the latter on 22.8 kilometres (14.2 mi) towards the northeast, then follows the course of the Saguenay river via La Petite Décharge on 172.3 kilometres (107.1 mi) until Tadoussac where it merges with the Saint Lawrence estuary.

== Toponymy ==
This toponym designation evokes the memory of François-Xavier Lemieux, Deputy Minister of Lands and Forests of Quebec from 1924 to 1936. The road between Quebec (city) and Lac Saint-Jean was opened during his tenure. Born in Quebec in 1877, Lemieux studied at the Jesuit college in Montreal. At the age of 23, at the end of his studies, Lemieux began a career in the Quebec public service. He was first secretary to Adélard Turgeon from 1900 to 1909, then to Jules Allard from 1909 to 1919 and, finally, to Honoré Mercier son until 1924, all three having successively occupied the post of minister des Terres et Forêts.

The toponym "Lac F.X.-Lemieux" was formalized on December 5, 1968, by the Commission de toponymie du Québec.

== See also ==
- La Jacques-Cartier Regional County Municipality
- Lac-Croche, a TNO
- Métabetchouane River
- Saguenay River
- Lac Saint-Jean
- List of lakes of Canada
