= Brûlé Lake (Lac-Jacques-Cartier) =

Lake in Capitale-Nationale, Quebec, Canada

- Location within Quebec
- Location: Lac-Jacques-Cartier, La Côte-de-Beaupré Regional County Municipality, Capitale-Nationale, Quebec, Canada
- Coordinates: 47°18′18″N 70°53′49″W
- Primary inflows: (Clockwise from the mouth) Lac des Vases outlet, an unidentified stream and the Lac à Chiens outlet
- Primary outflows: Outlet of Brûlé Lake
- Basin countries: Canada
- Max. length: 4.2 km (2.6 mi)
- Max. width: 1.7 km (1.1 mi)
- Surface elevation: 841 m (2,759 ft)

Lac Brûlé (English: Burnt Lake) is a body of fresh water located northeast of the city of Quebec, in the unorganized territory of Lac-Jacques-Cartier, in the La Côte-de-Beaupré Regional County Municipality, in the administrative region of Capitale-Nationale, in the province, in Quebec, in Canada.

Lac Brûlé is served by a few secondary forest roads for forestry purposes. Forestry is the main economic activity in this valley; recreational tourism, second.

Because of the altitude, the surface of Lac Brûlé is generally frozen from the end of November until the beginning of April; however, safe circulation on the ice is generally done from the beginning of December until the beginning of April.

== Geography ==
Lac Brûlé which is set between the mountains. Its mouth is located at:

- 24.0 kilometres (14.9 mi) west of the northwest shore of the St. Lawrence River;
- 54 kilometres (34 mi) west of the summit of Mont Raoul-Blanchard;
- 12.2 kilometres (7.6 mi) north-west of the confluence of the Sainte-Anne and Brûlé rivers;
- 33.0 kilometres (20.5 mi) southwest of downtown Baie-Saint-Paul.

Lac Brûlé has a length of 4.2 kilometres (2.6 mi), a width of 1.7 kilometres (1.1 mi) and an altitude of 841 metres (2,759 ft). This misshapen body of water looks like a mushroom, the stem of which leans west. Lac Savane is mainly supplied by the outlet of Lac des Vases, an unidentified stream and the outlet of Lac à Chiens. Lac Brûlé is a body of water artificially enhanced by the construction of a dam at its mouth.

From the dam at the mouth of Brûlé Lake, the current descends following the outlet of Brûlé Lake on 3.4 kilometres (2.1 mi), then the course of the Brûlé River on 18.6 kilometres (11.6 mi), then flows on 53.9 kilometres (33.5 mi) first towards the south-east, then the south-west, following the course of the Sainte-Anne River, which crosses downtown Beaupré, to the northwest shore of the Saint Lawrence River.

== Toponymy ==
Probably born around 1592 in Champigny-sur-Marne in France, Étienne Brûlé became an explorer and an interpreter in the Wendat (Huron) language. He arrived in the colony at the same time as Samuel de Champlain, with whom he enlisted in 1608. Brûlé was possibly the first European to have entered Huronia. He explored several territories including Georgian Bay and Lakes Huron, Ontario, Superior and Erie, where he traded furs for the French. During the illegal capture of Quebec by the Kirke brothers in 1629, in a context of war between England and France, Étienne Brulé went to the service of the English. Finally, the Treaty of Saint-Germain-en-Laye put an end to the conflict by restoring New France to France, in 1632. Samuel de Champlain returned to the colony and accuses Étienne Brûlé of treason in these terms: "Here are those who betrayed their Roy & sold their homeland […]". Étienne Brulé then took refuge in Huronia where he was killed, in the year 1633.

The toponym "Lac Savane" was formalized on March 25, 1997, at the Place Names Bank of the Commission de toponymie du Québec.

== See also ==
=== Related article ===
- La Côte-de-Beaupré Regional County Municipality
- Lac-Jacques-Cartier, an unorganized territory
- Brûlé River (Sainte-Anne River tributary)
- Sainte-Anne River (Beaupré)
- St. Lawrence River
