= Rivière aux Canots (Métabetchouane River tributary) =

- Location within Quebec

Location
- Country: Canada
- Province: Quebec
- Region: Saguenay-Lac-Saint-Jean
- Regional County Municipality: Lac-Saint-Jean-Est Regional County Municipality
- Unorganized territory: Belle-Rivière

Physical characteristics
- Source: Lac Staffieri
  - location: Belle-Rivière
  - coordinates: 48.04129°N 71.78718°W
  - elevation: 435 m (1,427 ft)
- Mouth: Métabetchouane River
  - location: Belle-Rivière
  - coordinates: 48.16222°N 71.87917°W
  - elevation: 330 m (1,080 ft)
- Length: 27.3 km (17.0 mi)
- Discharge
  - location: Belle-Rivière

Basin features
- Tributaries
  - left: (from the mouth) Discharge of lac Morainique, discharge of lac Hogue, discharge of lac des Massettes.
  - right: (from the mouth) Discharge of lac Madore, discharge of Lac Sous-le-Vent, ruisseau Gendreau.

The rivière aux Canots is a tributary of the east bank of the Métabetchouane River, flowing in the unorganized territory of Belle-Rivière, in the Lac-Saint-Jean-Est Regional County Municipality, in the administrative region of Saguenay–Lac-Saint-Jean, in the province of Quebec, in Canada. The upper part of this river crosses the Laurentides Wildlife Reserve.

The surface of the Rivière aux Canots (except the rapids areas) is usually frozen from the end of November to the beginning of April, however the safe circulation on the ice is generally done from mid-December to the end of March.

== Geography ==
The main watersheds neighboring the Rivière aux Canots are:

- north side: Métabetchouane River, rivière à la Carpe (Métabetchouane River), La Belle Rivière (Lac Saint-Jean), Saguenay River;
- east side: Gendreau stream, Pika River, rivière aux Écorces;
- south side: Huard lake, Métabetchouane River;
- west side: Métabetchouane River, Bruyante River, Fouet River.

The Rivière aux Canots rises at the mouth of Lake Staffieri (length: 0.9 kilometres (0.56 mi); altitude: 435 metres (1,427 ft)) in the shape of a U due to almost island attached to the north shore and stretching 0.3 kilometres (0.19 mi) to the south.

From its source, the course of Rivière aux Canots descends on 27.3 kilometres (17.0 mi), with a drop of 105 metres (344 ft), according to the following segments:

- 4.6 kilometres (2.9 mi) to the north by forming three hooks to the east, up to Gendreau stream (coming from the east);
- 2.4 kilometres (1.5 mi) north-west, up to the outlet (coming from the south) of "Lac des Massettes";
- 5.5 kilometres (3.4 mi) north-west, then west, winding, then west, until the outlet (coming from the south) of lakes Hogue, Glun, Castagnet and Gingras;
- 2.9 kilometres (1.8 mi) towards the north by snaking to the outlet (coming from the north) of "Lac Sous-le-Vent";
- 3.0 kilometres (1.9 mi) towards the northwest by first forming a hook towards the south, up to the outlet (coming from the south) of Morainique lake;
- 8.9 kilometres (5.5 mi) towards the northwest by winding at the end of the segment, to its mouth, located on the east bank of the Métabetchouane River.

From the confluence of the Aux Canots river, the current descends the Métabetchouane River north on 38.3 kilometres (23.8 mi) to the south shore of lac Saint-Jean; from there, the current crosses the latter on 22.8 kilometres (14.2 mi) towards the northeast, then borrows the course of the Saguenay River via La Petite Décharge on 172.3 kilometres (107.1 mi) until Tadoussac where it merges with the Saint Lawrence estuary.

== Toponymy ==
The toponym "Rivière aux Canots" is associated with the use of this watercraft and body of water

The toponym “Rivière aux Canots” was formalized on December 5, 1968, at the Place Names Bank of the Commission de toponymie du Québec.

== See also ==
- St. Lawrence River
- List of rivers of Quebec
