= Petit lac Métascouac =

Body of water in Quebec, Canada

- Location in Quebec
- Location: Lac-Croche (TNO), La Jacques-Cartier Regional County Municipality, Capitale-Nationale
- Coordinates: 47.65778°N 71.85167°W
- Lake type: Natural
- Primary inflows: (clockwise from the mouth) Discharge of an unidentified lake, Métascouac River.
- Primary outflows: Métabetchouane River
- Basin countries: Canada
- Max. length: 3.6 km (2.2 mi)
- Max. width: 0.5 km (0.31 mi)
- Surface elevation: 439 m (1,440 ft)

The Petit lac Métascouac is a freshwater body crossed by the Métascouac River, in the unorganized territory of Lac-Croche, in the La Jacques-Cartier Regional County Municipality, in the administrative region of Capitale-Nationale, in the province of Quebec, in Canada. This lake is located in the Laurentides Wildlife Reserve, very close to the limit of the administrative region of Mauricie.

Petit lac Métascouac is indirectly served by a few secondary forest roads for the needs of forestry and recreational tourism activities.

Forestry is the main economic activity in the sector; recreational tourism, second.

The surface of Petit lac Métascouaci is usually frozen from the beginning of December to the end of March, however the safe circulation on the ice is generally made from mid-December to mid-March.

== Geography ==
The main neighboring watersheds of "Petit lac Métascouac" are:

- north side: Métascouac River, Métabetchouane River;
- east side: Métabetchouane East River, Liane stream, rivière de la Place;
- south side: Métabetchouane River, Métabetchouane East River, rivière à Moïse;
- west side: Métabetchouane River, Saint-Henri Lake.

Petit lac Métascouac has a length of 3.6 kilometres (2.2 mi), a width of 0.5 kilometres (0.31 mi) and an altitude of 439 metres (1,440 ft). This lake is mainly fed by the outlet of the Métascouac River (coming from the north by Lake Ouelette) and an unidentified stream. This lake has five narrowing due to peninsulas that are close to each other. The Métascouac River crosses this lake over its full length.

The mouth of Petit lac Métascouac is located at the far south end of the lake, at the confluence of the Métabetchouane River, either:

- 10.8 kilometres (6.7 mi) south-east of the mouth of Saint-Henri Lake which is crossed by the Métabetchouane River;
- 27.5 kilometres (17.1 mi) east of the Canadian National railway;
- 104 kilometres (65 mi) west of downtown Baie-Saint-Paul;
- 1.2 kilometres (0.75 mi) north-east of the center of the village of Lac-Édouard;
- 86.6 kilometres (53.8 mi) south-east of the mouth of the Métabetchouane River, on the south shore of lac Saint-Jean.

From the mouth of "Petit lac Métascouac", the current follows the course of:

- Métabetchouane River on 123.6 kilometres (76.8 mi) generally towards the northwest;
- lac Saint-Jean on 22.25 kilometres (13.83 mi) north-east until la petite Décharge;
- Saguenay River via the La Petite Décharge on 172.3 kilometres (107.1 mi) eastwards to Tadoussac where it merges with the Saint Lawrence estuary.

== Toponymy ==
The toponym "Petit lac Métascouac" was formalized on December 5, 1968, by the Commission de toponymie du Québec.

== See also ==
- St. Lawrence River
- List of lakes of Canada
