= Sawine River =

- Location within Quebec
- Native name: Rivière Sawine (French)

Location
- Country: Canada
- Province: Quebec
- Region: Saguenay-Lac-Saint-Jean
- Regional County Municipality: Le Fjord-du-Saguenay Regional County Municipality
- Unorganized territory: Lac-Ministuk

Physical characteristics
- Source: Lac du Virage
  - location: Lac-Ministuk
  - coordinates: 48.07917°N 71.57594°W
  - elevation: 511 m (1,677 ft)
- Mouth: Rivière aux Écorces
  - location: Lac-Ministuk
  - coordinates: 48.21194°N 71.55972°W
  - elevation: 339 m (1,112 ft)
- Length: 20.4 km (12.7 mi)
- Discharge
  - location: Lac-Ministuk

Basin features
- Tributaries
  - left: (from the mouth) Discharge of lac Chouinard, discharge of lac Chartrand, discharge of petit lac Morin.
  - right: (from the mouth) Discharge of lac Daoust, discharge of an unidentified lake, discharge of lac Riendeau and of lac de la Ravenelle.

The Sawine River is a tributary of the Rivière aux Écorces, flowing in the unorganized territory of Lac-Ministuk, in the Le Fjord-du-Saguenay Regional County Municipality, in the administrative region of Saguenay–Lac-Saint-Jean, in the province from Quebec, to Canada. The course of the Sawine River crosses the northwestern part of the Laurentides Wildlife Reserve.

The small valley of the Sawine River is located near route 169. This valley is also served by a few secondary forest roads, especially for forestry and recreational tourism activities.

Forestry is the main economic activity in this valley; recreational tourism, second.

The surface of the Sawine River is usually frozen from the beginning of December to the end of March, however the safe circulation on the ice is generally made from mid-December to mid-March.

== Geography ==
The main watersheds adjacent to the Sawine River are:

- north side: Bras des Angers, Pikauba River, Plessis stream, ruisseau L'Abbé, Rivière aux Écorces;
- east side: Pika River, Pikauba River, Le Grand Ruisseau, Damasse brook, Petite rivière Pikauba, Cyriac River;
- south side: Écluse stream, Blanc stream, Gabrielle stream, Lac aux Écorces, Pika River;
- west side: Morin River, Thom stream, Belle Rivière lake, Métabetchouane River.

The Sawine River rises at the confluence of Lac du Virage (length: 0.4 kilometres (0.25 mi); altitude: 511 metres (1,677 ft)) in a forest area in the Laurentides Wildlife Reserve. This source is located at:

- 0.7 kilometres (0.43 mi) north of lac Morin;
- 3.9 kilometres (2.4 mi) south-west of route 169;
- 7.2 kilometres (4.5 mi) east of the Rivière aux Écorces;
- 14.8 kilometres (9.2 mi) south-east of the confluence of the Sawine river and the Rivière aux Écorces;
- 3.9 kilometres (2.4 mi) west of Custeau Lake, which is crossed by Pika River;
- 45.1 kilometres (28.0 mi) south-east of lac Saint-Jean.

From its source, the Sawine River flows over 20.4 kilometres (12.7 mi) with a drop of 172 metres (564 ft) entirely in the forest zone, according to the following segments:

- 0.9 kilometres (0.56 mi) north across Lac du Cabanon (altitude: 511 metres (1,677 ft)), up to the outlet (coming from the west) of Petit Lac Morin;
- 6.0 kilometres (3.7 mi) northerly collecting a stream (coming from the south-east) and curving towards the north-west, up to the bridge of the route 169;
- 4.9 kilometres (3.0 mi) towards the northwest by snaking to the outlet (coming from the northeast) of Lac Chartrand;
- 0.6 kilometres (0.37 mi) northwards, to a stream (coming from the south-west);
- 3.6 kilometres (2.2 mi) north to Daoust stream (coming from the east);
- 4.4 kilometres (2.7 mi) towards the north by forming a hook towards the east, then by bending towards the northwest, until its mouth.

The Sawine river flows on the southeast bank of the Rivière aux Écorces. This confluence is located at:

- 0.3 kilometres (0.19 mi) north-east of the confluence of the Morin River and the Rivière aux Écorces;
- 7.6 kilometres (4.7 mi) west of the course of the Pikauba River;
- 8.8 kilometres (5.5 mi) north-east of Belle Rivière lake;
- 9.7 kilometres (6.0 mi) south of the confluence of the Pikauba River and the Rivière aux Écorces;
- 15.3 kilometres (9.5 mi) south-east of the confluence of the Pikauba River and Kenogami Lake;
- 43.4 kilometres (27.0 mi) southwest of the confluence of the Chicoutimi River and the Saguenay River in the Chicoutimi sector of the city of Saguenay.

From the mouth of the Sawine river, the current successively follows the course of the Rivière aux Écorces on 13.3 kilometres (8.3 mi) towards the northeast, the course of the Pikauba River on 10.6 kilometres (6.6 mi) generally towards the north, crosses Kenogami Lake on 17.6 kilometres (10.9 mi) towards the northeast until at Barrage de Portage-des-Roches, then follows the course of the Chicoutimi River on 26.2 kilometres (16.3 mi) towards the east, then the northeast and the course of the Saguenay River on 114.6 kilometres (71.2 mi) eastward to Tadoussac where it merges with the Saint Lawrence estuary.

== Toponymy ==
The toponymic designation “Sawine River” appears on a 1947 map of Laurentian National Park. This acronym evokes the memory of an Abenaki family, more particularly that of Ambroise O'Bomsawin and her son Amable. In the 1850s, this family would have settled in Mashteuiatsh, in Lac-Saint-Jean. The specific “Sawine” would therefore be the shortened form of the surname O'Bomsawin.

The toponym “Sawine River” was formalized on December 5, 1968, at the Place Names Bank of the Commission de toponymie du Québec.

== Appendices ==
=== Related articles ===
- Le Fjord-du-Saguenay Regional County Municipality
- Lac-Ministuk, a TNO
- Laurentides Wildlife Reserve
- Rivière aux Écorces
- Pikauba River
- Kenogami Lake
- Chicoutimi River
- Saguenay River
- List of rivers of Quebec
