= Rivière aux Écorces North-East =

River in Lac-Jacques-Cartier, Canada

- Location within Quebec
- Native name: Ruisseau Tremblay (French)

Location
- Country: Canada
- Province: Quebec
- Region: Capitale-Nationale
- Regional County Municipality: La Côte-de-Beaupré Regional County Municipality
- Unorganized territory: Lac-Jacques-Cartier

Physical characteristics
- Source: Petit lac Vézina
  - location: Lac-Jacques-Cartier
  - coordinates: 47.72245°N 71.32321°W
  - elevation: 857 m (2,812 ft)
- Mouth: Rivière aux Écorces
  - location: Lac-Jacques-Cartier
  - coordinates: 47.79306°N 71.70917°W
  - elevation: 477 m (1,565 ft)
- Length: 54.3 km (33.7 mi)
- Discharge
  - location: Lac-Jacques-Cartier

Basin features
- Tributaries
  - left: (from the mouth) Ruisseau non identifié, décharge du lac Safrane, décharge du lac Frenette, décharge du lac Alonne, décharge du lac Saint-Georges, ruisseau Kane, ruisseau non identifié, ruisseau Martel, décharge du lac Duchâtelets, décharge du lac Gineau, ruisseau Joyal, ruisseau Delphis, ruisseau Madeleine, décharge du lac aux Loups, discharge of Jacqueline Lake.
  - right: (from the mouth) Ruisseau non identifié, décharge du lac Paul-Eugène, décharge des lacs Portelance, Petit lac du Midi et Montraye, décharge des lacs Maher et Dupin, ruisseau du Portage, décharge des lacs Dreux, des Calypsos, Gagnon et Étang des Aréthuses, ruisseau Simard.

The rivière aux Écorces North-East is a tributary of the rivière aux Écorces, flowing in the unorganized territories of Lac-Jacques-Cartier, the La Côte-de-Beaupré Regional County Municipality, in the administrative region of Capitale-Nationale, in the province of Quebec, Canada. The course of the rivière aux Écorces North-East crosses the western part of the Laurentides Wildlife Reserve.

The valley of the rivière aux Écorces Nord-Est is served indirectly by the route 169 and directly by the forest road R0261 which goes up the valley of the rivière aux Écorces and the Rivière aux Écorces Nord-East. This valley is also served by some secondary forest roads, especially for forestry and recreational tourism activities.

Forestry is the main economic activity in this valley; recreational tourism, second.

The surface of the rivière aux Écorces North-East is usually frozen from the beginning of December to the end of March, however the safe circulation on the ice is generally made from mid-December to mid-March.

== Geography ==
The main watersheds neighboring the rivière aux Écorces North-East are:

- north side: rivière aux Écorces, Trompeuse River, Cloutier stream, Fortin stream, rivière aux Canots, Portage stream, Madeleine stream;
- east side: Pikauba River, Pikauba Lake, Talbot Lake, Black stream;
- south side: rivière aux Écorces du Milieu, Frenette Lake, Saint-Georges Lake, Germain Lake, Jacqueline Lake;
- west side: rivière aux Écorces, Corneillier Lake, Métascouac Lake.

The rivière aux Écorces North-East has its source at Petit lac Vézina (length: 0.6 kilometres (0.37 mi); altitude: 857 metres (2,812 ft)) in the forest zone in the Laurentides Wildlife Reserve. This source is located at:

- 2.4 kilometres (1.5 mi) north of Honorine Lake;
- 2.6 kilometres (1.6 mi) east of Jacqueline Lake;
- 8.5 kilometres (5.3 mi) south-west of route 175;
- 12.6 kilometres (7.8 mi) north-west of Jacques-Cartier Lake;
- 12.7 kilometres (7.9 mi) south of the junction of route 169 and route 175;
- 27.8 kilometres (17.3 mi) south-east of the summit of the hamlet Mont-Apica;
- 30.1 kilometres (18.7 mi) east of the confluence of the Rivière aux Écorces North-East and the rivière aux Écorces.

From its source (Petit lac Vézina), the rivière aux Écorces North-East flows over 54.3 kilometres (33.7 mi) with a drop of 380 metres (1,250 ft) entirely in the forest zone, depending on the segments following:

Upper course of the Rivière aux Écorces North-East (segment of 23.5 kilometres (14.6 mi))

- 1.7 kilometres (1.1 mi) towards the northwest in particular by crossing Lake Vézina (length: 1.1 kilometres (0.68 mi); altitude: 821 metres (2,694 ft)) on 1.0 kilometre (0.62 mi), to its mouth;
- 9.9 kilometres (6.2 mi) towards the northeast by meandering, until the outlet (coming from the southeast) of Jacqueline Lake;
- 1.5 kilometres (0.93 mi) to the west, forming a curve towards the north, up to the outlet (coming from the south) of Lac aux Loups;
- 4.4 kilometres (2.7 mi) north-west across rapids, to Madeleine stream (coming from the north-east);
- 1.3 kilometres (0.81 mi) towards the south-west crossing three series of rapids and curving towards the north-west, up to Delphis stream (coming from the south);
- 4.7 kilometres (2.9 mi) towards the northwest by forming a loop towards the east in the middle of the segment and another towards the south at the end of the segment, up to the Portage stream (coming from the north);

Intermediate course of the Rivière aux Écorces North-East (segment of 17.7 kilometres (11.0 mi))

- 2.2 kilometres (1.4 mi) south passing between two mountains, to Joyal stream (coming from the south);
- 2.1 kilometres (1.3 mi) north-west curving west, to a bend in the river;
- 2.9 kilometres (1.8 mi) towards the southwest, curving towards the west, collecting the outlet (coming from the southwest) from lac Gineau and the Martel stream (coming from the south) to the outlet (coming from the north) from Lac Duchâtelets;
- 2.3 kilometres (1.4 mi) south-west, to the outlet (coming from the north) of lakes Charland, Joibert, Maher and Dupin;
- 8.2 kilometres (5.1 mi) towards the south by forming a curve towards the west, by collecting the discharge (coming from the west) of the Paul-Eugène lake, by collecting the brook Kane (coming from the east ) and crossing Lake Rancourt for a hundred meters (length: 0.7 kilometres (0.43 mi); altitude: 574 metres (1,883 ft)), to its mouth. Note: this lake is fed by the outlet of lakes Saint-Georges and Sayer. A marsh area characterizes the entire northern area of this lake;

Lower reaches of the North East Bark River (segment of 13.1 kilometres (8.1 mi))

- 8.9 kilometres (5.5 mi) south-west in a deep valley, forming a large curve towards the north to go around a mountain whose summit reaches 779 metres (2,556 ft) and crossing several rapids, to a stream (coming from the east);
- 4.2 kilometres (2.6 mi) towards the northwest by crossing some rapids and bending towards the west at the end of the segment, until its mouth.

The northeastern rivière aux Écorces North-East flows on the northeast bank of the rivière aux Écorces. This confluence is located at:

- 9.2 kilometres (5.7 mi) east of Métascouac Lake;
- 8.6 kilometres (5.3 mi) south-east of lac aux Écorces;
- 9.4 kilometres (5.8 mi) north-west of the mouth of the rivière aux Écorces du Milieu;
- 34.4 kilometres (21.4 mi) southwest of the junction of rout 169;
- 33.2 kilometres (20.6 mi) east of the Canadian National railway;
- 57 kilometres (35 mi) south-east of the confluence of the Pikauba River and the rivière aux Écorces;
- 62.4 kilometres (38.8 mi) south-east of the confluence of the Pikauba River and Kenogami Lake;
- 85.1 kilometres (52.9 mi) southwest of the confluence of the Chicoutimi River and the Saguenay River in the Chicoutimi sector of the town of Saguenay (city).

From the mouth of the rivière aux Écorces North-East, the current successively follows the course of the rivière aux Écorces on 83.6 kilometres (51.9 mi) generally towards the north, the course of the Pikauba River on 10.6 kilometres (6.6 mi) generally towards the north, crosses Kenogami Lake on 17.6 kilometres (10.9 mi) north-east until barrage de Portage-des-Roches, then follows the course from the Chicoutimi River on 26.2 kilometres (16.3 mi) east, then the northeast and the course of the Saguenay River on 114.6 kilometres (71.2 mi) east to Tadoussac where it merges with the Saint Lawrence estuary.

== Toponymy ==
The toponym “Rivière aux Écorces Nord-Est” was formalized on December 5, 1968, at the Place Names Bank of the Commission de toponymie du Québec.

=== See also ===
- List of rivers of Quebec
