= Lac aux Écorces =

- Location in Quebec
- Location: Lac-Jacques-Cartier (TNO), La Côte-de-Beaupré Regional County Municipality, Capitale-Nationale
- Coordinates: 47.90889°N 71.73861°W
- Lake type: Natural
- Primary inflows: (clockwise from the mouth) rivière aux Écorces, des ruisseaux riverains, la décharge du lac Labelle, par la décharge des lacs à la Culotte et Bina, le ruisseau Salvail et la décharge du lac Tréteau
- Primary outflows: rivière aux Écorces
- Basin countries: Canada
- Max. length: 7.1 km (4.4 mi)
- Max. width: 0.6 km (0.37 mi)
- Surface elevation: 398 m (1,306 ft)

The lac aux Écorces (English: bark lake) is a freshwater body crossed by the Rivière aux Écorces, in the unorganized territory of Lac-Jacques-Cartier, in the La Côte-de-Beaupré Regional County Municipality, in the administrative region of Capitale-Nationale, in the province from Quebec, to Canada. Lac aux Écorces is part of the Laurentides Wildlife Reserve.

The area around the lake is served indirectly by the route 169 (connecting Quebec (city) to Alma) and by the route 155 (connecting La Tuque and Chambord). Some secondary forest roads serve this area for forestry and recreational tourism activities.

Forestry is the main economic activity in the sector; recreational tourism, second.

The surface of Lac aux Écorces is usually frozen from the beginning of December to the end of March, however the safe circulation on the ice is generally from mid-December to mid-March.

== Geography ==
The main watersheds near Lac aux Écorces are:

- north side: rivière aux Écorces, Sawine River, lac de la Belle Rivière, Kenogami Lake;
- east side: Lac à la Culotte, Trompeuse River, rivière aux Canots, Apica River, Pikauba River;
- south side: rivière aux Écorces, Samson Lake, Corneillier Lake, Métabetchouane East River;
- west side: Lac aux Montagnais, Métascouac Lake, Métabetchouane River.

Lac aux Écorces turns out to be a widening of the rivière aux Écorces.

Lac aux Écorces has a length of 7.1 kilometres (4.4 mi), a width of 0.6 kilometres (0.37 mi) and an altitude of 398 metres (1,306 ft). This lake is mainly fed by the Pikauba River which crosses this lake towards the northeast, by riparian streams, by the outlet (coming from the east) of Labelle lake, by the outlet (coming from the north) from lakes to Culotte and Bina, Salvail stream (coming from the east) and the outlet (coming from the west) from Tréteau lake. The mouth of Lac aux Écorces is located to the north, at:

- 4.7 kilometres (2.9 mi) north of Croche stream;
- 4.7 kilometres (2.9 mi) south of the mouth of the rivière aux Canots;
- 8.4 kilometres (5.2 mi) west of the mouth of Lake Harvey which is the head lake of the Trompeuse River;
- 22.7 kilometres (14.1 mi) south-west of route 169;
- 24.6 kilometres (15.3 mi) south-west of the ex-hamlet of Mont-Apica;
- 47.6 kilometres (29.6 mi) south of the confluence of the Pikauba River and Kenogami Lake.

From the mouth of Lac aux Écorces, the current follows the course of:

- the rivière aux Écorces on 60.8 kilometres (37.8 mi) generally towards the northeast;
- the Pikauba River on 35.0 kilometres (21.7 mi) generally towards the northeast;
- the Kenogami Lake on 17.6 kilometres (10.9 mi) towards the northeast to barrage de Portage-des-Roches;
- the Chicoutimi River on 26.2 kilometres (16.3 mi) to the east, then the northeast;
- the Saguenay River on 114.6 kilometres (71.2 mi) eastward to Tadoussac where it merges with the Saint Lawrence estuary.

== Toponymy ==
The toponym lac aux Écorces was formalized on December 5, 1968, by the Commission de toponymie du Québec.

=== See also ===
- St. Lawrence River
- List of lakes of Canada
