= Rivière de la Place =

- Location within Quebec

Location
- Country: Canada
- Province: Quebec
- Region: Capitale-Nationale
- Regional County Municipality: La Côte-de-Beaupré Regional County Municipality, La Jacques-Cartier Regional County Municipality
- Unorganized territory: Lac-Jacques-Cartier Lac-Croche

Physical characteristics
- Source: Lac des Buttes
  - location: Lac-Jacques-Cartier
  - coordinates: 47.61773°N 71.67547°W
  - elevation: 747 m (2,451 ft)
- Mouth: Métabetchouane River
  - location: Lac-Croche
  - coordinates: 47.58916°N 71.82389°W
  - elevation: 470 m (1,540 ft)
- Length: 21.8 km (13.5 mi)
- Discharge
  - location: Lac-Croche

Basin features
- Tributaries
  - left: (upward from the mouth) Décharge du Lac des Gerbes, décharge du lac des Souches, décharge du lac Narval, décharge des lacs Gimaudière et de la Grande Ourse, lac des Fourrés, décharge du lac du Talweg.
  - right: (upward from the mouth) Décharge du lac Bernier.

The Rivière de la Place is a tributary of the east bank of the Métabetchouane River, flowing in the Laurentides Wildlife Reserve, in the administrative region of the Capitale-Nationale, in the province of Quebec, in Canada. The river flows through the regional county municipalities (MRC) of:

- La Côte-de-Beaupré Regional County Municipality: the unorganized territory of Lac-Jacques-Cartier;
- La Jacques-Cartier Regional County Municipality: the unorganized territory of Lac-Croche.

Forestry is the main economic activity in this valley; recreational tourism, second.

The "rivière de la Place" surface (except rapids) is usually frozen from late November to early April, however safe circulation on the ice is generally from mid-December to late March.

== Geography ==
The main watersheds neighboring the "rivière de la Place" are:

- north side: Métabetchouane East River, Liane stream, Sansoucy lake;
- east side: F.-X.-Lemieux Lake, rivière Jacques-Cartier Nord-Ouest;
- south side: Métabetchouane River, Lac Croche;
- west side: Métabetchouane River, Passes stream.

The "rivière de la Place rises at the mouth of Lac des Buttes (length: 0.3 kilometres (0.19 mi); altitude: 747 metres (2,451 ft)). Enclosed between mountains, this lake has a single small stream feeding it. The mouth of Lac des Buttes is located: 11.6 kilometres (7.2 mi) north-east of the confluence of the Place river and the Métabetchouane River, at 10.8 kilometres (6.7 mi) north of lac aux Rognons and 34 kilometres (21 mi) west of Jacques-Cartier Lake.

From its source, the course of the Place River descends on 21.8 kilometres (13.5 mi), with a drop of 277 metres (909 ft), according to the following segments:

Upper course of the Place river (from its source) (segment of 10.1 kilometres (6.3 mi))

- 1.2 kilometres (0.75 mi) southwards crossing 0.3 kilometres (0.19 mi) on Lake Lafavry (altitude: 734 metres (2,408 ft)), then on 0.4 kilometres (0.25 mi) Lac du Terrier (altitude: 729 metres (2,392 ft)), to its mouth;
- 5.0 kilometres (3.1 mi) south to the outlet (coming from the east) of Talweg lake;
- 0.8 kilometres (0.50 mi) towards the south by forming a hook towards the west by cutting for a hundred meters the southern part of the Lac des Fourrés, up to its mouth;
- 1.8 kilometres (1.1 mi) to the south by forming a hook towards the east at the end of the segment, to the east shore of Lake Neuville;
- 1.3 kilometres (0.81 mi) westward across Lake Neuville (altitude: 658 metres (2,159 ft)) over a full-length, to its mouth;

Lower course of the Place River (segment of 11.7 kilometres (7.3 mi))

- 2.0 kilometres (1.2 mi) to the west, branching south to a stream (coming from the south);
- 6.1 kilometres (3.8 mi) westwards crossing three series of rapids at the start of the segment, up to a bend in the river;
- 2.3 kilometres (1.4 mi) to the west, forming a large curve to the south to go around a mountain, up to a bend in the river;
- 1.3 kilometres (0.81 mi) towards the southwest by crossing a series of rapids, until its confluence with the Métabetchouane River (coming from the southeast).

From the confluence of the Place river, the current descends the Métabetchouane river north on 131.5 kilometres (81.7 mi) to the south shore of lac Saint-Jean; from there, the current crosses the latter on 22.8 kilometres (14.2 mi) towards the northeast, then borrows the course of the Saguenay River via la Petite Landfill on 172.3 kilometres (107.1 mi) to Tadoussac where it merges with the Saint Lawrence estuary.

== Toponymy ==
The expression "de la Place" refers to the family name "De La Place" of French origin.

The toponym "Place River" was formalized on December 5, 1968, at the Place Names Bank of the Commission de toponymie du Québec.

== See also ==
- St. Lawrence River
- List of rivers of Quebec
