= Métabetchouane East River =

Metabetchouan East River Old name: Rivière de la Place
- Location within Quebec
- Native name: Rivière Métabetchouane Est (French)

Location
- Country: Canada
- Province: Quebec
- Region: Capitale-Nationale, Saguenay–Lac-Saint-Jean
- Regional County Municipality: La Côte-de-Beaupré Regional County Municipality
- Unorganized territory: Lac-Jacques-Cartier

Physical characteristics
- Source: Lac de la Hauteur des Terres
  - location: Lac-Jacques-Cartier, Capitale-Nationale
  - coordinates: 47.64089°N 71.49988°W
  - elevation: 819
- Mouth: Métabetchouane River
  - location: Lac-Jacques-Cartier
  - coordinates: 47.60139°N 71.86056°W
  - elevation: 444 m (1,457 ft)
- Length: 54 km (34 mi)

Basin features
- Tributaries
  - left: (from the mouth) Ruisseau Liane, décharge du lac Legault, décharge des lacs du Bocage et des Nourrains, décharge du Petit lac Missip (via le lac Missip), décharge des lacs Badaillac, Lime et Frêle, décharge du lac des Margouilies, décharge des lac Frétin, Tentant et du Petit lac Tentant, décharge du lac Bourbier.
  - right: (from the mouth) Décharge du Lac du Raidillon, décharge des lacs Florissant, Dunoyon et Boisseau, ruisseau Maria, décharge du Lac Amphore, ruisseau Gratia, décharge des lacs des Fourmis, Carrelet, Cybèle, Saturne, Bonnier, Niguet, Petit lac Ninguet et l'Étang des Brindilles, décharge du lac Sigma, décharge des lacs Athos et Porthos.

The Métabetchouane East river is a tributary of the northeast shore of the Métabetchouane River, flowing in the Laurentides Wildlife Reserve, in the unorganized territory of Lac-Jacques-Cartier, in the La Côte-de-Beaupré Regional County Municipality, in the administrative region of Capitale-Nationale, in the province from Quebec, to Canada.

Forestry is the main economic activity in this valley; recreational tourism, second.

The surface of the Métabetchoune River (except the rapids zones) is usually frozen from the end of November to the beginning of April, however the safe circulation on the ice is generally done from mid-December to the end of March.

== Geography ==
The main watersheds neighboring the Métabetchouane Est river are:

- north side: Métabetchouane River, Rivière aux Écorces du Milieu;
- east side: Cavée River, Launière River;
- south side: Liane stream, Rivière de la Place, Métabetchouane River, Jacques-Cartier River;
- west side: Métabetchouane River, Brûlé Lake.

The Métabetchouane Est River takes its source at the mouth of "Lac des Hautes des Terres" (length: 1.1 km (0.68 mi); altitude: 819 m (2,687 ft)). Enclosed between mountains, this lake is linked on the north side by a small stream with the "Lac de la Hauteur" which turns out to be the head lake of the rivière aux Écorces du Milieu. The mouth of "Lac des Hauts des Terres" is located: 2.5 km (1.6 mi) south of the source of the source of rivière aux Écorces du Milieu, at 2.9 km (1.8 mi) northwest of Lac Chagnon, 4.3 km (2.7 mi) northeast of Lac Tentant and 37.4 km (23.2 mi) northeast.

From its source, the course of the Métabetchouane East river descends on 54 km (34 mi), with a drop of 375 m (1,230 ft), according to the following segments:

Upper course of the Métabetchouane East River (from its source) (segment of 18.4 km (11.4 mi))

- 1.8 km (1.1 mi) southwards crossing 0.7 km (0.43 mi) on Lake Mousseau, then Lake Aramis, to the outlet (coming from the north-west) from Lakes Athos and Porthos;
- 1.5 km (0.93 mi) to the south, forming a large S, up to the outlet (coming from the east) of Lac Bourbier;
- 2.4 km (1.5 mi) towards the west by forming a hook towards the south and meandering, until the outlet (coming from the southwest) of lakes Fretin, Tentant and Petit lac Tentant;
- 2.6 km (1.6 mi) north-east, to the outlet (coming from the north-east) from Lake Sigma;
- 4.6 km (2.9 mi) to the west, collecting the outlet (coming from the south) from Lac des Margouilies, and branching northwest to the Gratia stream (coming from the north);
- 5.5 km (3.4 mi) south-east, then south by collecting the discharge (coming from the east) from Badaillac, Lime and Frêle lakes, to the north shore of Missip lake;

Intermediate course of the Métabetchouane East river (segment of 19.3 km (12.0 mi))

- 6.5 km (4.0 mi) to the west, sometimes winding and collecting the discharge (coming from the south-east) from the Nourrains and Bocage lakes;
- 2.6 km (1.6 mi) south-west, then north-west, up to Maria stream (coming from the north);
- 4.6 km (2.9 mi) north-west, up to a bend in the river;
- 5.6 km (3.5 mi) south-west, to the outlet (coming from the north-west) from lakes Boisseau, Dunoyon and Étang Florissant;

Lower course of the Métabetchouane Est river (segment of 16.3 km (10.1 mi))

- 3.9 km (2.4 mi) first on 1.8 km (1.1 mi) towards the south-west in a deep valley up to a bend of the river; then on 2.1 km (1.3 mi) towards the south-east, then the south-west, up to the Liane stream (coming from the south-east);
- 7.8 km (4.8 mi) towards the southwest by forming a large S, crossing a few series of rapids then forming a loop towards the southeast, until the outlet (coming from the north) from the Lake Raidillon;
- 4.6 km (2.9 mi) to the southwest by forming serpentines at the end of the segment near a marsh area, until it meets the Métabetchouane River (coming from the southeast).

From the confluence of the Métabetchouane East river, the current descends the Métabetchouane North River on 131.5 km (81.7 mi) to the south shore of lac Saint-Jean; from there, the current crosses the latter on 22.8 km (14.2 mi) towards the northeast, then borrows the course of the Saguenay River via La Petite Landfill on 172.3 km (107.1 mi) until Tadoussac where it merges with the Saint Lawrence estuary.

== Toponymy ==
The term "Métabetchouane" is associated with two rivers, a lake, a city and an archaeological site.

The toponym “Rivière Métabetchouane Est” was formalized on December 5, 1968, at the Place Names Bank of the Commission de toponymie du Québec.

=== See also ===
- St. Lawrence River
- List of rivers of Quebec
