= Rivière aux Écorces (Pikauba River tributary) =

- Location within Quebec

Location
- Country: Canada
- Province: Quebec
- Region: Capitale-Nationale and Saguenay-Lac-Saint-Jean
- Regional County Municipality: La Côte-de-Beaupré Regional County Municipality, Lac-Saint-Jean-Est Regional County Municipality and Le Fjord-du-Saguenay Regional County Municipality
- Unorganized territory: Lac-Jacques-Cartier and Lac-Ministuk

Physical characteristics
- Source: Lac de la Hauteur des Terres
  - location: Lac-Jacques-Cartier
  - coordinates: 47.64690°N 71.50111°W
  - elevation: 818
- Mouth: Pikauba River
  - location: Lac-Ministuk
  - coordinates: 48.32472°N 71.44083°W
  - elevation: 230 m (750 ft)
- Length: 120.3 km (74.8 mi)
- Discharge
  - location: Lac-Ministuk

Basin features
- Tributaries
  - left: (from the mouth) Ruisseau Normand, ruisseau l'Abbé, décharge de l'Étang des Élans, décharge des lacs Pelasse et de la Reine, décharge du lac Currie, ruisseau à Thom, ruisseau à Paul, ruisseau Croche, ruisseau Fructus, ruisseau Gabrielle, le Gros Ruisseau, décharge du lac Salloir, décharge des lacs Samson et Érin, ruisseau Mater, décharge du lac des Centaines, décharge du lac Belzébuth, ruisseau Eugène, décharge du lac Verdâtre, décharge des lacs Mineur et Lorgnon.
  - right: (from the mouth) Décharge du lac de la Ligne, Sawine River, Morin River, décharge du lac Achouakan, ruisseau Dufour, ruisseau à la Raquette, ruisseau de l'écluse, ruisseau Blanc, rivière aux Canots, décharge du lac Lacombe, décharge du lac Labelle, décharge du lac à la Culotte (via le lac aux Écorces), ruisseau Salvail (via le lac aux Écorces), Trompeuse River, ruisseau de l'Araignée, ruisseau du Gros-Jos, rivière aux Écorces Nord-Est, décharge du lac du Ruisselet, rivière aux Écorces du Milieu, ruisseau des Sept Chutes, ruisseau Beaudoin.

The Rivière aux Écorces is a tributary of the Pikauba River, in the province of Quebec, in Canada. Its course successively crosses the regional county municipalities (MRC) of:

- La Côte-de-Beaupré Regional County Municipality (administrative region of Capitale-Nationale): unorganized territory Lac-Jacques-Cartier;
- Lac-Saint-Jean-Est Regional County Municipality (administrative region of Saguenay–Lac-Saint-Jean): unorganized territory of Lac-Moncouche, Belle-Rivière and Lac-Achouakan;
- Le Fjord-du-Saguenay Regional County Municipality (administrative region of Saguenay–Lac-Saint-Jean): unorganized territory of Lac-Ministuk.

The Rivière aux Écorces valley is mainly accessible by the route 169 (route d'Iberville); other secondary forest roads have been developed in the sector for forestry and recreational tourism activities.

Forestry is the primary economic activity in the sector; recreational tourism, second.

The surface of the Rivière aux Écorces is usually frozen from the end of November to the beginning of April, however the safe circulation on the ice is generally done from mid-December to the end of March.

== Geography ==
Taking its source at some 820 metres (2,690 ft) altitude, in the "lac de la Hauteur des Terre", the Rivière aux Écorces crosses the lake of the same name. Its course over 120.3 kilometres (74.8 mi) is generally oriented towards the north, almost entirely included in the Laurentides Wildlife Reserve.

The main watersheds neighboring the Morin River are:

- north side: Bras des Angers, Pikauba River, Plessis stream, Barnabé stream, ruisseau L'Abbé, Kenogami Lake;
- east side: Sawine River, Morin River, rivière aux Écorces North-East, Pikauba River, Pika River, Petite rivière Pikauba, Cyriac River;
- south side: Métabetchouane River, Métabetchouane East River, Cavée River, Moïse River;
- west side: Métabetchouane River, Moncouche River, Chaine River, Rivière aux Canots.

The Rivière aux Écorces rises at the mouth of the "Lac de la Hauteur des Terres" (length: 1.1 kilometres (0.68 mi); altitude:818 metres (2,684 ft)) in the forest zone in the Laurentides Wildlife Reserve. This source is located at:

- 2.0 kilometres (1.2 mi) west of a fire watchtower, located at the top of a mountain (altitude: 1,004 metres (3,294 ft));
- 2.7 kilometres (1.7 mi) north-east of the course of the Métabetchouane East River;
- 19.7 kilometres (12.2 mi) south-west of route 175;
- 20.4 kilometres (12.7 mi) west of Jacques-Cartier Lake;
- 70.7 kilometres (43.9 mi) south-east of the confluence of Rivière aux Écorces and Pikauba River;
- 91.4 kilometres (56.8 mi) south-east of lac Saint-Jean.

From its source, the Rivière aux Écorces flows over 120.3 kilometres (74.8 mi) with a drop of 588 metres (1,929 ft) entirely in the forest zone, according to the following segments:

Upper course of the Rivière aux Écorces (segment of 36.7 kilometres (22.8 mi))

- 2.3 kilometres (1.4 mi) towards the north by forming a curve towards the east to bypass a mountain (summit at 911 metres (2,989 ft)), then crossing the Lac de la Valeur (length: 1.1 kilometres (0.68 mi)); altitude: 803 metres (2,635 ft));
- 1.6 kilometres (0.99 mi) first towards the north crossing Lake Marceau (altitude: ), then branching west, to the outlet (coming from the north Lac Écureuil);
- 6.7 kilometres (4.2 mi) to the west passing between the mountains, then the southwest, to the outlet (coming from the south) of Lac Villier;
- 3.6 kilometres (2.2 mi) towards the west by winding, up to the Sept Chutes stream (coming from the northeast);
- 2.7 kilometres (1.7 mi) towards the south-west by collecting the discharge (coming from the north) of the Lac de la Gemme, up to a bend of the river corresponding to the discharge (coming from the south-east) of the lake Thunay and Petit Lac Thunay;
- 4.9 kilometres (3.0 mi) north-west until the confluence of the rivière aux Écorces du Milieu (coming from the north);
- 14.9 kilometres (9.3 mi) towards the north-west by collecting the Eugène stream (coming from the south) and the outlet (coming from the north) of the Ruisselet lake, as well as by bending towards the north by going around mountains, and collecting the discharge (coming from the west) from Lac Beelzebub, up to the confluence of the Rivière aux Écorces North-East;

Intermediate course of the Rivière aux Écorces, in front of the Rivière aux Écorces North-East (segment of 30.8 kilometres (19.1 mi))

- 3.3 kilometres (2.1 mi) to the north, forming a large S and collecting Mater stream (coming from the northwest);
- 4.5 kilometres (2.8 mi) by first forming a hook towards the east, then towards the north by collecting the Gros-Jos stream (coming from the south-east) and the Araignée stream (coming from the east), to the confluence of the Trompeuse River (coming from the north);
- 8.9 kilometres (5.5 mi) towards the northwest by forming some serpentines in the marsh area, to the south shore of Cadieux Lake;
- 6.1 kilometres (3.8 mi) north-west across lac aux Écorces (length: 7.1 kilometres (4.4 mi); altitude: 398 metres (1,306 ft)), to its mouth;
- 8.0 kilometres (5.0 mi) towards the north, forming small serpentines up to the Rivière aux Canots (coming from the east);

Intermediate course of the Rivière aux Écorces, downstream from the Rivière aux Canots (segment of 31.0 kilometres (19.3 mi))

- 10.3 kilometres (6.4 mi) towards the north by forming a loop towards the west, up to Fructus stream;
- 4.8 kilometres (3.0 mi) to the north by collecting the Éclume stream (coming from the south-east), then bending towards the east, to the Raquette stream (coming from the south-east) );
- 2.8 kilometres (1.7 mi) to the north by collecting the Dufour stream (coming from the east), to the Croche stream (coming from the west);
- 7.9 kilometres (4.9 mi) to the north by collecting the outlet (coming from the east) from Lac Muskeg, then crossing the Rapides Deux Milles, to the stream at Paul (coming from the southwest);
- 3.9 kilometres (2.4 mi) to the northwest, then north to the outlet (coming from the northwest) of Lac Currie;
- 1.3 kilometres (0.81 mi) towards the north by crossing route 169, to the outlet (coming from the northwest) of Queen's and Pelasse lakes;

Lower course of the Rivière aux Écorces (segment of 21.8 kilometres (13.5 mi))

- 3.8 kilometres (2.4 mi) northwards forming a large S, to the outlet (coming from the west) of Lac Latreuille and des Élans;
- 4.4 kilometres (2.7 mi) towards the northeast by forming a large curve towards the northwest to go around a mountain whose summit reaches until the confluence of the Morin River (coming from the south);
- 0.3 kilometres (0.19 mi) north-east to the confluence of the Sawine River (coming from the south-east);
- 5.6 kilometres (3.5 mi) first towards the north-east on up to a bend in the river, then towards the north-west crossing rapids, until the outlet (coming from the east) from Lac au Bouleau (Mont-Élie);
- 7.7 kilometres (4.8 mi) towards the north by forming a curve towards the West to go around a mountain whose summit reaches 426 metres (1,398 ft), then crossing a series of rapids, until its mouth.

The Rivière aux Écorces flows on the west bank of the Pikauba River. This confluence is located at:

- 5.7 kilometres (3.5 mi) south-west of the confluence of the Pikauba River and Kenogami Lake;
- 16.1 kilometres (10.0 mi) north-east of lac de la Belle Rivière;
- 17.1 kilometres (10.6 mi) west of route 175;
- 32.4 kilometres (20.1 mi) south-east of lac Saint-Jean;
- 34.4 kilometres (21.4 mi) southwest of the confluence of the Chicoutimi River and the Saguenay River in the Chicoutimi sector of the city of Saguenay (city).

From the confluence of the Rivière aux Écorces with the Pikauba River, the current successively descends the Pikauba River on 35.0 kilometres (21.7 mi) toward north-east, then the current crosses the Kenogami Lake on 17.6 kilometres (10.9 mi) toward north-east up to the Barrage de Portage-des-Roches, then follows the course of the Chicoutimi River on 26.2 kilometres (16.3 mi) to the east, then the northeast, and the course of the Saguenay River on 114.6 kilometres (71.2 mi) east to Tadoussac where it merges with the Saint Lawrence estuary.

== Toponymy ==
On the map of Eugène Taché (1880), the Rivière aux Écorces was only a segment of about 15 kilometres (9.3 mi) in length, south of Kenogami Lake, then merging with the Chicoutimi River; the rest of the river to the south, being designated "R. Upicauba". However, in 1886, the surveyor J. Maltais clarified and attributed to the watercourse a length of 80 kilometres (50 mi). In the 1950s, the toponym "Rivière aux Écorces" was finally used alone to designate this river, whereas at the beginning of the century, and even until 1942, the identification, still ambiguous, was Rivière aux Écorces or Upikaubau.

The toponym "Rivière aux Écorces" was formalized on December 5, 1968, at the Place Names Bank of the Commission de toponymie du Québec.
