= Métabetchouane River =

Metabetchouan River
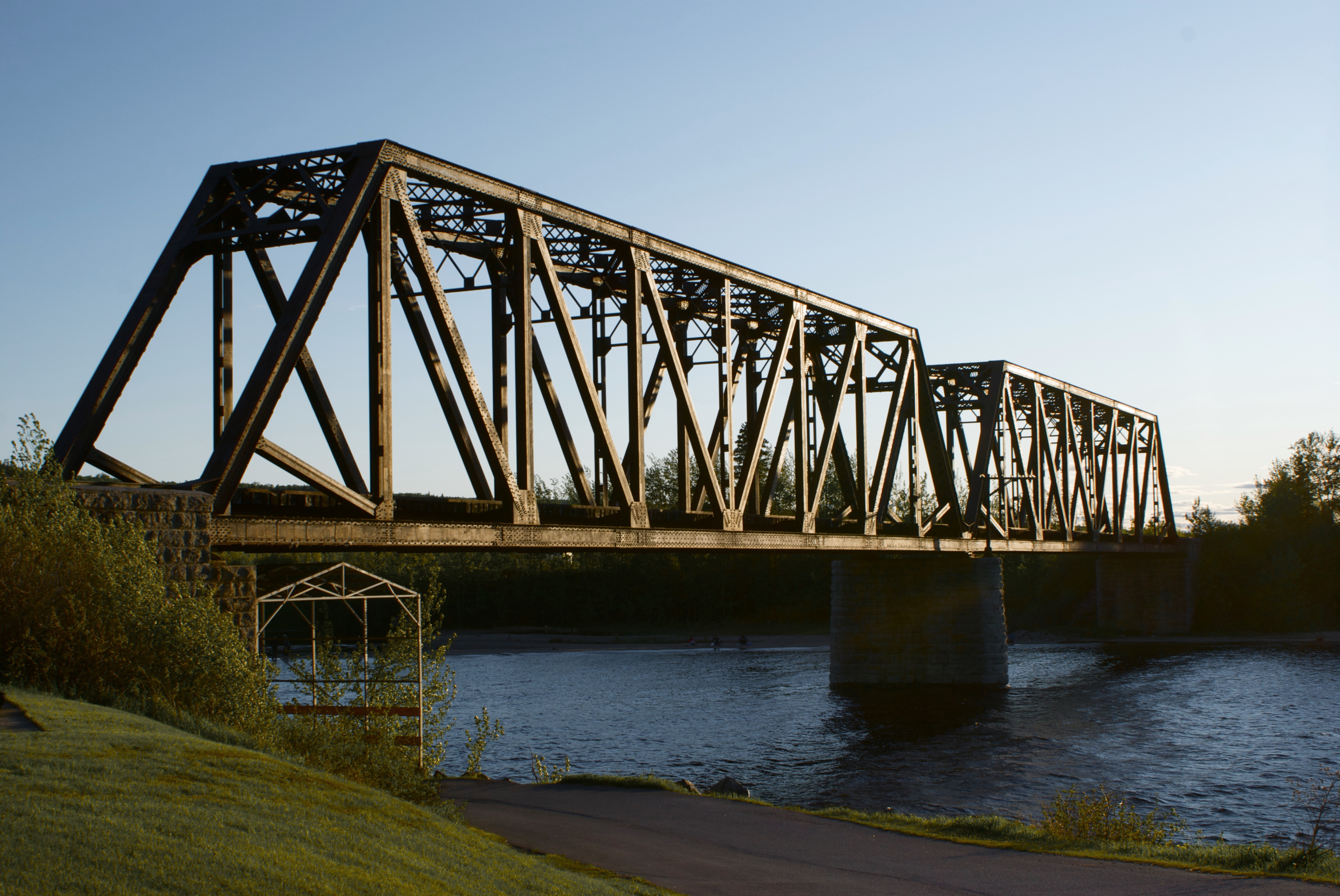
- Native name: Rivière Métabetchouane (French)

Location
- Country: Canada
- Province: Quebec
- Region: Capitale-Nationale, Saguenay–Lac-Saint-Jean

Physical characteristics
- Source: Mâles and Bouteille Lakes
  - location: Lac-Croche, Capitale-Nationale
  - coordinates: 47°26′09″N 71°41′07″W
  - elevation: 701
- Mouth: Lac Saint-Jean
  - location: Chambord / Desbiens, Saguenay–Lac-Saint-Jean
  - coordinates: 48°25′15″N 71°57′55″W
  - elevation: 99 m (325 ft)
- Length: 169.4 km (105.3 mi)
- Basin size: 2,245 km^{2} (867 sq mi)
- Discharge
  - average: 47 m^{3}/s (1,700 cu ft/s)

Basin features
- Tributaries
  - left: (from the mouth) grande rivière Désir, rivière Prudent, ruisseau du Carcajou, ruisseau Noir, décharge du lac Pichou, décharge des lacs des Deux Clubs et Rond, rivière de la Chaine, décharge du lac Rousseau, décharge du lac de Fol Orignal, rivière à la Chute, décharge du lac Les Mares, décharge du lac à Renard, décharge du lac Rat Musqué et du lac du Vison, décharge du lac Bohémier, décharge du lac Guêpe, décharge du lac Voisard, décharge du lac Monbleau, décharge des lacs Teraux et des Couvains, décharge du lac des Lobélies, décharge des lacs Bastien et du Duc, décharge du lac Fleury, décharge du lac Roublard, décharge du lac Gagné, décharge du lac de la Douve, décharge du Petit lac Rocand, décharge du lac Arène, décharge d'un ensemble de lacs dont Lessard, Miron, Manseau et Lamarre, décharge du lac Esmery, décharge du lac Baribeau, décharge du lac des Morilles et Étang de Rétention.
  - right: (from the mouth) rivière MacDonald, décharge du Le Réservoir, rivière L'Abbé, décharge d'un ensemble de lacs dont Brûlé, Saint-Patrice, Eire, de la Place, ruisseau du Cimetière, rivière à la Carpe, ruisseau des Femmes (décharge du Petit lac à la Carpe), ruisseau Louise, Partie intermédiaire (en amont de la rivière aux Canots) rivière aux Canots, décharge du lac Huard, décharge du lac des Luzules, décharge du lac Bacchus, décharge du lac Pélée, décharge des lacs Hervieux, Ossian et Michaud, décharge du lac Rollin, décharge du lac du Brion, décharge du lac Joly, décharge du lac du Boucan et du lac Topping, décharge du lac des Félins, décharge du lac Levin, décharge du lac de la Branloire, décharge du lac du Sillon, décharge du lac Mallette, Partie intermédiaire (en amont de la rivière Moncouche); Moncouche River, décharge du lac de l'Aigail, décharge du lac Tourlay, ruisseau Long, décharge des lacs Cérès, Taylor et Turmaine, décharge du lac Pélichy, décharge du lac Goudard et du lac Dulong, décharge du lac Gemme, décharge du lac Bureau, décharge des lacs Théophile et Desève, décharge du lac Lavoie et Oudant, Métascouac River, Métascouac South River, Partie supérieure Métabetchouane East River, rivière de la Place, décharge du lac de la Giboulée, décharge des lacs Serré et Coquille, décharge du lac Ombrelle, décharge des lacs Oblong et Minime, décharge du lac Laberge, décharge du lac Bourette et Henri-Mercier, décharge du Petit lac Companay et du lac Compagnay, décharge du lac Gazaille.

The Metabetchouan River (French: Métabetchouane) is a tributary of Lac Saint-Jean in the centre of the province of Quebec, Canada. The course of this river successively crosses the regional county municipalities (MRC) of:

- La Jacques-Cartier Regional County Municipality (administrative region of Capitale-Nationale): in the unorganized territory of Lac-Croche;
- La Tuque (administrative region of Mauricie):
- Lac-Saint-Jean-Est Regional County Municipality (administrative region of Saguenay–Lac-Saint-Jean): in the unorganized territory of Lac-Moncouche;
- Le Domaine-du-Roy Regional County Municipality (administrative region of Saguenay–Lac-Saint-Jean): in the municipality of Saint-André-du-Lac-Saint-Jean.

It ends at Desbiens, where a cave called Le trou de la Fée is located. Its source are the Mâles and Bouteille Lakes in the Laurentides Wildlife Reserve and it is 128 kilometres (80 mi) long.

The river has been dammed for hydroelectric power. Now, it is also a tourist river with rafting, canoeing, and fishing opportunities. It is known for its reserve of fresh-water salmon. In the region of Saguenay-Lac-Saint-Jean, this fish is known as Ouananiche.

This watercourse begins in the Laurentides Wildlife Reserve. The course of this river constitutes:

- the western limit of the territory of the Laurentides Wildlife Reserve, between Lac Long and Métabetchouane Lake;
- the eastern limit of the controlled harvesting zone Zec Kiskissink and the Laurentides Wildlife Reserve;
- the boundary between the municipalities of Lac-Bouchette and Saint-André-du-Lac-Saint-Jean.

The Métabetchouane river valley is mainly accessible by:

- intermediate part: forest road R0279 passing north of Saint-Henri Lake;
- lower part: route 169 along the south shore of lac Saint-Jean, the Trou-de-la-Fée road, the Chambord road, the rang path Saint-Hilaire.

The surface of the Métabetchoune River (except the rapids zones) is usually frozen from the end of November to the beginning of April, however the safe circulation on the ice is generally done from mid-December to the end of March.

== Geography ==
With an average flow of 47 m^{3}/s, it takes its source in the Laurentides Wildlife Reserve. It has several falls, including the "chute à l'Épouvante" (Fall to the Horror) and the Martine Fall.

The main watersheds neighboring the Métabetchouane River are:

- north side: lac Saint-Jean;
- east side: Métabetchouane East River, rivière aux Écorces, Pikauba River, Saguenay River;
- south side: Batiscan River, Jacques-Cartier River;
- west side: Bouchette Lake, Lac des Commissaires, Ouiatchouan River, Ouellet River.

The Métabetchouane river rises at the mouth of Lac des Mâles (length: 1.8 km (1.1 mi); altitude: 701 m (2,300 ft)). This lake is enclosed between mountains, one peak of which 820 m (2,690 ft) to the east and another to 875 m (2,871 ft) in the southwest. This lake is mainly fed by the outlet (coming from the west) of lakes Hansel, Gretel, Petit lac Matteau and lac Matteau. Its mouth is located north at: 9.3 km (5.8 mi) south-east of lac aux Rognons, 10.6 km (6.6 mi) west of Petit lac Jacques-Cartier, 16.1 km (10.0 mi) northeast of Batiscan Lake, 50.7 km (31.5 mi) east of Lac-Édouard, 39.1 km (24.3 mi) northeast of Beaudet station on the Canadian National railway, 8.8 km (5.5 mi) northwest of fire tower which was built at the top of Mont McKinney and 20.9 km (13.0 mi) west of the course of the Jacques-Cartier River.

From its source, the course of the Métabetchouane river descends on 169.4 km (105.3 mi), with a drop of 600 m (2,000 ft), according to the following segments:

Upper course of the Métabetchouane river (from its source) (segment of 45.8 km (28.5 mi))

- 1.2 km (0.75 mi) first towards the north, then on 0.15 km (0.093 mi) towards the east by crossing the south-eastern part of Lac de la Bouteille (length: 1.8 km (1.1 mi); altitude: 679 m (2,228 ft)), to its mouth;
- 6.2 km (3.9 mi) towards the north by collecting (coming from the south-east) the outlet of Lac Gazaille, up to the outlet (coming from the east) of Lac Compagnay and Petit Lac Compagnay;
- 15.1 km (9.4 mi) first towards the west while winding, then towards the northwest, and crossing lac aux Rognons (length: 5.0 km (3.1 mi); altitude: 589 m (1,932 ft)) on 3.7 km (2.3 mi) to the north, bypassing a peninsula from the east, to its mouth;
- 11.1 km (6.9 mi) towards the northwest by forming serpentines in the middle of the segment, until the confluence of the rivière de la Place (coming from the east);
- 4.3 km (2.7 mi) towards the west by forming a narrow loop towards the west in the marsh area, until the confluence of the Métabetchouane East River (coming from the northeast);
- 7.9 km (4.9 mi) to the north by collecting the discharge (coming from the west) from Lac de la Place, crossing Clairière lake in the marsh area, and crossing on 1.6 km (0.99 mi) north-west the southern part of Petit lac Métascouac (length: 6.5 km (4.0 mi); altitude: 439 m (1,440 ft)), up to its mouth. Note: The small Métascouac lake receives from the north the Métascouac River;

Upper course of the Métabetchouane river (downstream of Petit lac Métascouac) (segment of 53.6 km (33.3 mi))

- 7.6 km (4.7 mi) towards the northwest by forming a loop towards the south at the beginning of the segment, then crossing Hugh Lake (length: 5.2 km (3.2 mi); altitude: 424 km (263 mi)) over its full length, to its mouth;
- 6.2 km (3.9 mi) northwards crossing Saint-Henri Lake (length: 7.0 km (4.3 mi); altitude: 413 m (1,355 ft)), to its mouth;
- 9.6 km (6.0 mi) first towards the north passing under the bridge of the forest road R0279, then curving towards the west, and the northwest crossing Lake Long (length: 5.0 km (3.1 mi); altitude: 412 m (1,352 ft)) to its mouth;
- 16.3 km (10.1 mi) towards the northwest by bending to the east at the end of the segment, until the confluence of the Rivière aux Montagnais (coming from the northeast);
- 3.4 km (2.1 mi) to the west by forming two detours to the north, up to Naquagami bay (eastern part of Métabetchouane Lake);
- 10.5 km (6.5 mi) towards the northwest by crossing Métabetchouane Lake (altitude: 382 m (1,253 ft)) over its full length, up to its mouth;

Intermediate course of the Métabetchouane river (downstream of Métabetchouane lake) (segment of 31.7 km (19.7 mi))

- 7.6 km (4.7 mi) to the north by collecting the discharge (coming from the northwest) from Lac du Vison, Georgette and Muskrat, forming a loop to the north to go around a mountain by crossing rapids, and a second loop where it collecting the discharge (coming from the east) of the lake of Félins, and collecting at the end of the segment the discharge (coming from the southwest) of the lakes Honorat and the Mares, up to the confluence of the rivière à la Chute (coming from the northwest);
- 8.8 km (5.5 mi) towards the south-east by forming a curve towards the north to bypass a mountain, then curving towards the north-east by forming a detour towards the west where it crosses rapids, making a curve towards the east, to the confluence of the Rivière de la Chaîne (coming from the northwest);
- 10.0 km (6.2 mi) first towards the north, then by bending towards the northeast, collecting at the end of the segment the discharge (coming from the west) from Lake Pichou and the discharge from Lac des Two Clubs, up to the outlet of Lake Huard (coming from the southeast);
- 5.3 km (3.3 mi) northwards to Rivière aux Canots (coming from the east);

Intermediate course of the Métabetchouane river (downstream of the Rivière aux Canots) (segment of 19.2 km (11.9 mi))

- 5.4 km (3.4 mi) towards the northwest by collecting the Black stream (coming from the southwest) at the beginning of the segment, curving towards the west crossing a long series of rapids and forming a loop towards the north, up to the Carcajou stream (coming from the south);
- 4.0 km (2.5 mi) towards the northwest by forming a hook towards the north crossing the White Fall and several rapids, up to the Louise stream (coming from the northeast);
- 5.6 km (3.5 mi) towards the northwest by forming a loop towards the southwest at the start of the segment, up to the outlet (coming from the northeast) from Petit lac à la Carpe;
- 4.2 km (2.6 mi) north-west until the confluence of the Carpe River;

Lower course of the Métabetchouane river (segment of 19.1 km (11.9 mi))

- 2.6 km (1.6 mi) north-east passing in front of the village of Saint-André-du-Lac-Saint-Jean, up to the Prudent River (coming from South);
- 8.0 km (5.0 mi) first towards the north-east until mid-segment, then towards the north passing in front of the hamlet "La Martine" and bypassing Île à Ringuette, to the confluence of the Grande Rivière Désir (coming from the west);
- 1.8 km (1.1 mi) to the east by crossing a dike, then a few rapids, to a bend in the river;
- 6.7 km (4.2 mi) to the north in a deep valley crossing Martine Falls, forming a detour west to go around a mountain, passing on the east side of the Twin Mountains and crossing on 1.7 km (1.1 mi) the bay of Villa-des-Érables, passing under the bridge of route 169 and under the railway bridge of Canadian National, up to at its mouth. Note: The MacDonald River flows onto the east shore of this bay.

At its mouth on the south shore of lac Saint-Jean, the Métabetchouane river forms a small lake, between the village of Chambord to the west and Desbiens to the east.

From the mouth of the Métabetchouane river on the south shore of lac Saint-Jean, the current crosses the latter on 22.8 km (14.2 mi) towards the northeast, then follows the course of the Saguenay River via La Petite Décharge on 172.3 km (107.1 mi) until Tadoussac where it merges with the Saint Lawrence estuary.

== Toponymy ==
Its name is of Innu origin, but cognates exist in other Cree and Anishinabe dialects. From the roots matabi and djiwan (spelled matapetshuan in the modern Innu orthography), it can be translated as "river that empties into a lake".

== History ==
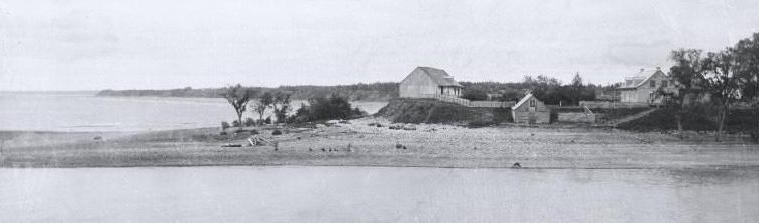
Hudson's Bay Company trading post, circa 1890

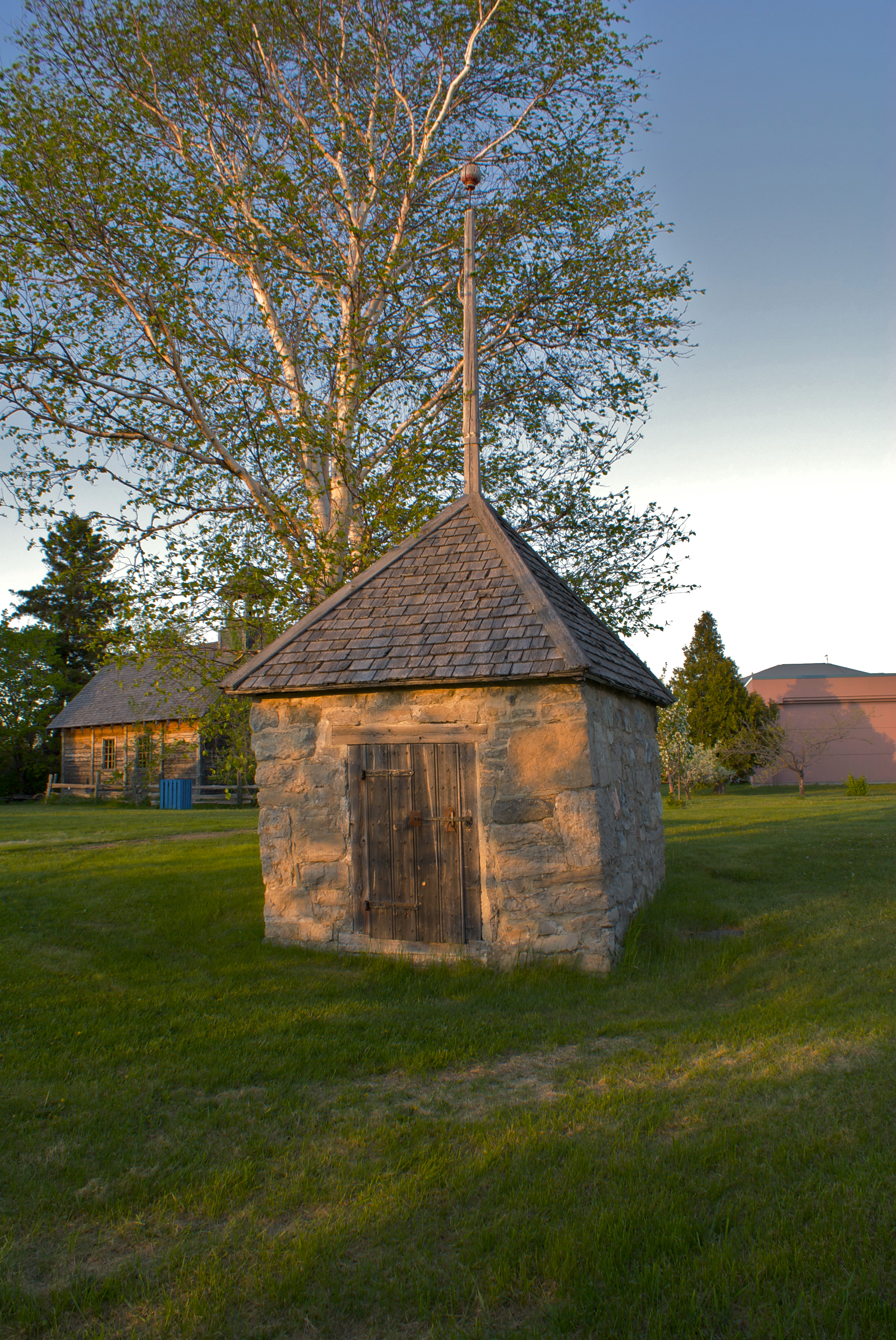
Powder magazine of the 18th century built along the Métabetchouane River

The mouth of the river may have been a seasonal Innu camp for thousands of years and the river itself was used as a route between Lake Saint-Jean and the Quebec City region. Important archaeological excavations on the banks of the river led, in the 1960s, to the discovery of a site frequented by the Amerindians since approximately 5000 years. In 1647, Jean de Quen was the first European to visit the place but his report did not make mention of the river. Some two decades later in 1676, the first reference was made of this river as Metabeki8an in the second register of Tadoussac. A French trading post was erected at its mouth in 1676. That same year, Jesuits established the Saint-Charles Mission at the river's mouth. In the mid 19th century, William Price began logging along the length of the river and it was used for a long time for log driving.

== See also ==
- List of rivers of Quebec
