= Lac-Croche =

- Unorganized territory
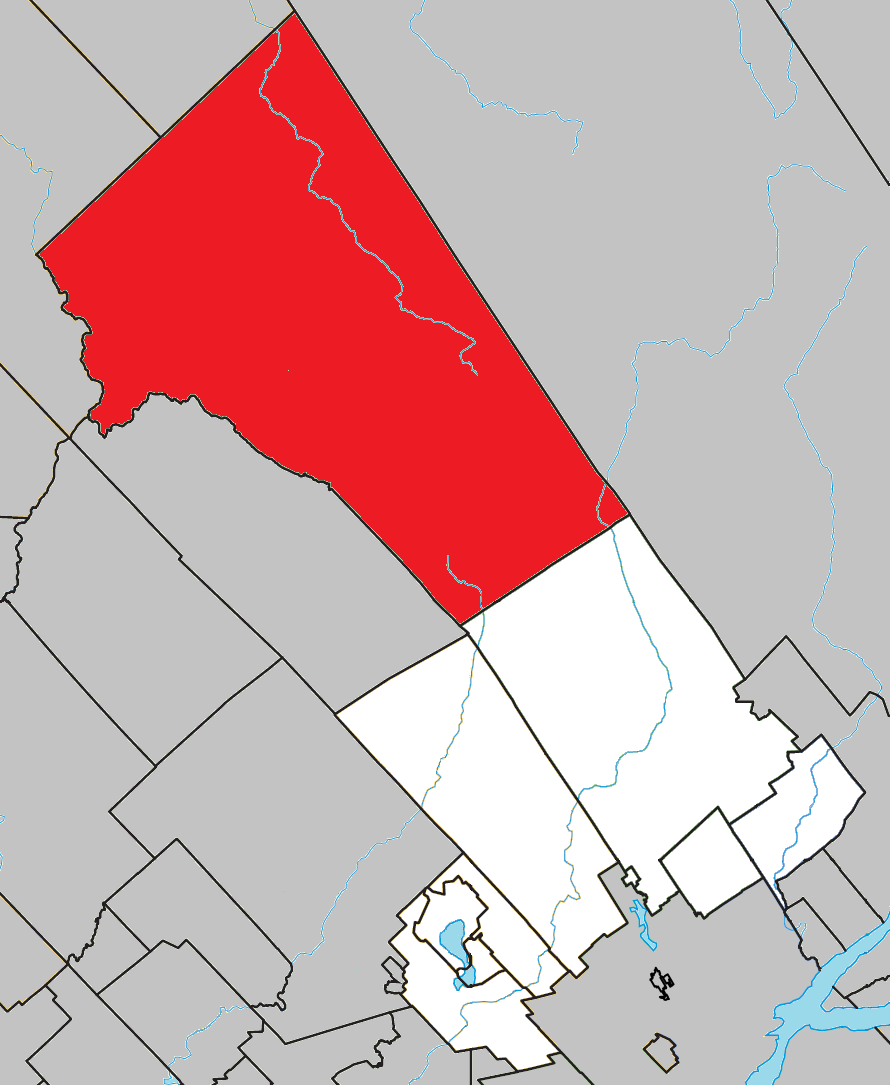
- Location within La Jacques-Cartier RCM

- Location in central Quebec
- Coordinates: 47°24′N 71°47′W
- Country: Canada
- Province: Quebec
- Region: Capitale-Nationale
- RCM: La Jacques-Cartier
- Constituted: January 1, 1986

Government
  - Fed. riding: Saint-Augustin—Portneuf—Jacques-Cartier
  - Prov. riding: Chauveau

Area
  - Total: 1,782.54 km^{2} (688.24 sq mi)
  - Land: 1,679.99 km^{2} (648.65 sq mi)

Population (2021)
  - Total: 0
  - Density: 0/km^{2} (0/sq mi)
  - Pop (2016-21): 0.0%
  - Dwellings: 0
- Time zone: UTC−5 (EST)
  - Summer (DST): UTC−4 (EDT)
- Highways: No major routes

Lac-Croche (French pronunciation: [la kʁɔʃ]) is an unorganized territory in the Capitale-Nationale region of Quebec, Canada, in the north of La Jacques-Cartier Regional County Municipality, taking up more than 50% of this regional county. It is unpopulated and undeveloped, almost entirely part of the Laurentides Wildlife Reserve.

It is named after Lake Croche, roughly located in the centre of the territory. The name "Croche", French for crooked or hook, refers to the curved shape of the lake.

== Demographics ==
Historical census populations – Lac-Croche

Year	Pop.	±%
1981	0	—
1986	0	0.00%
1991	8	—
1996	0	−100.0%
2001	0	0.00%

Year	Pop.	±%
2006	0	0.00%
2011	0	0.00%
2016	0	0.00%
2021	0	0.00%

Source: Statistics Canada

Private dwellings occupied by usual residents: 0 (total dwellings: 0)

== See also ==
- List of unorganized territories in Quebec
