= Lac-Jacques-Cartier, Quebec =

Lac-Jacques-Cartier
- Unorganized territory
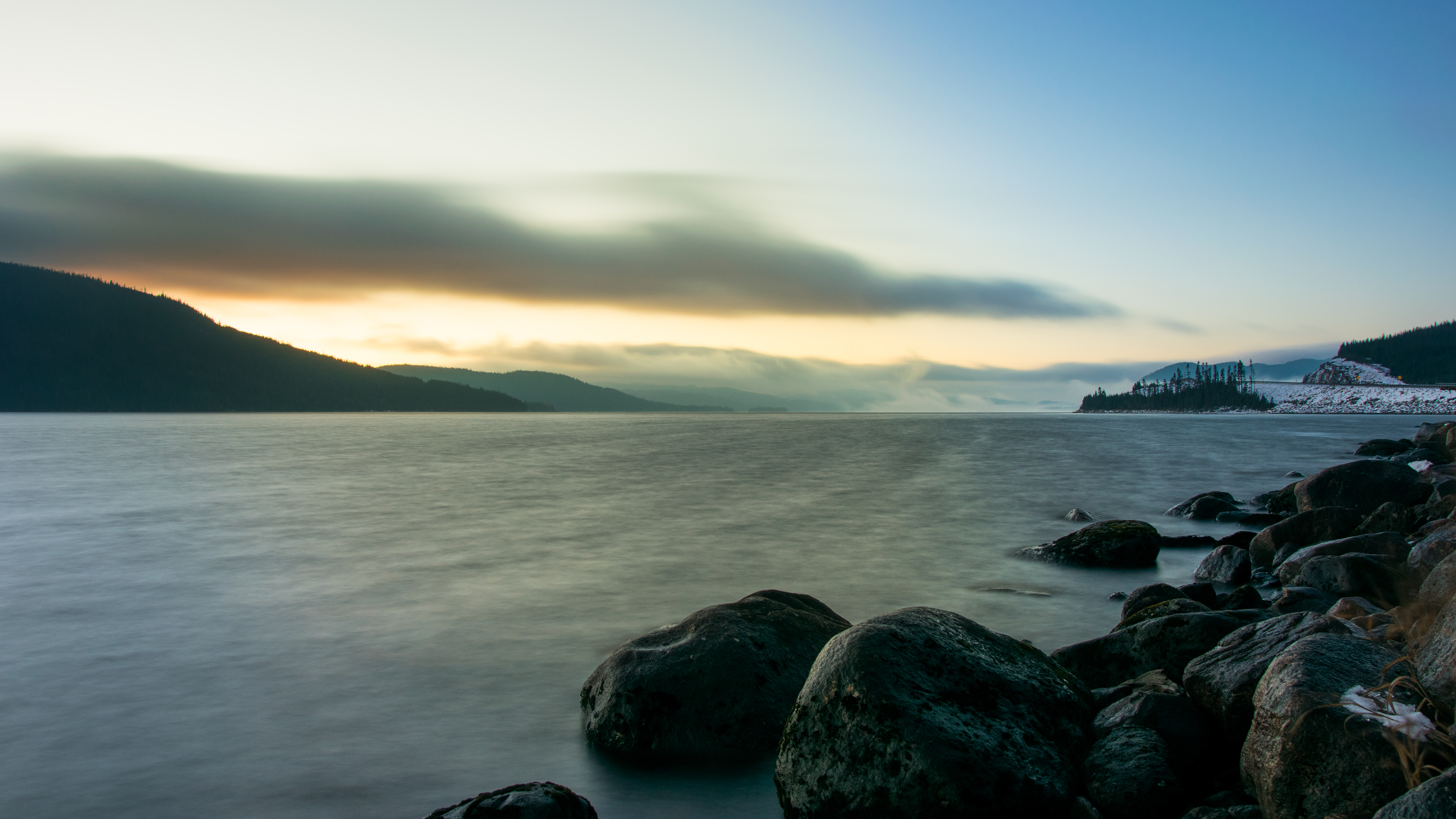
- Lake Jacques Cartier

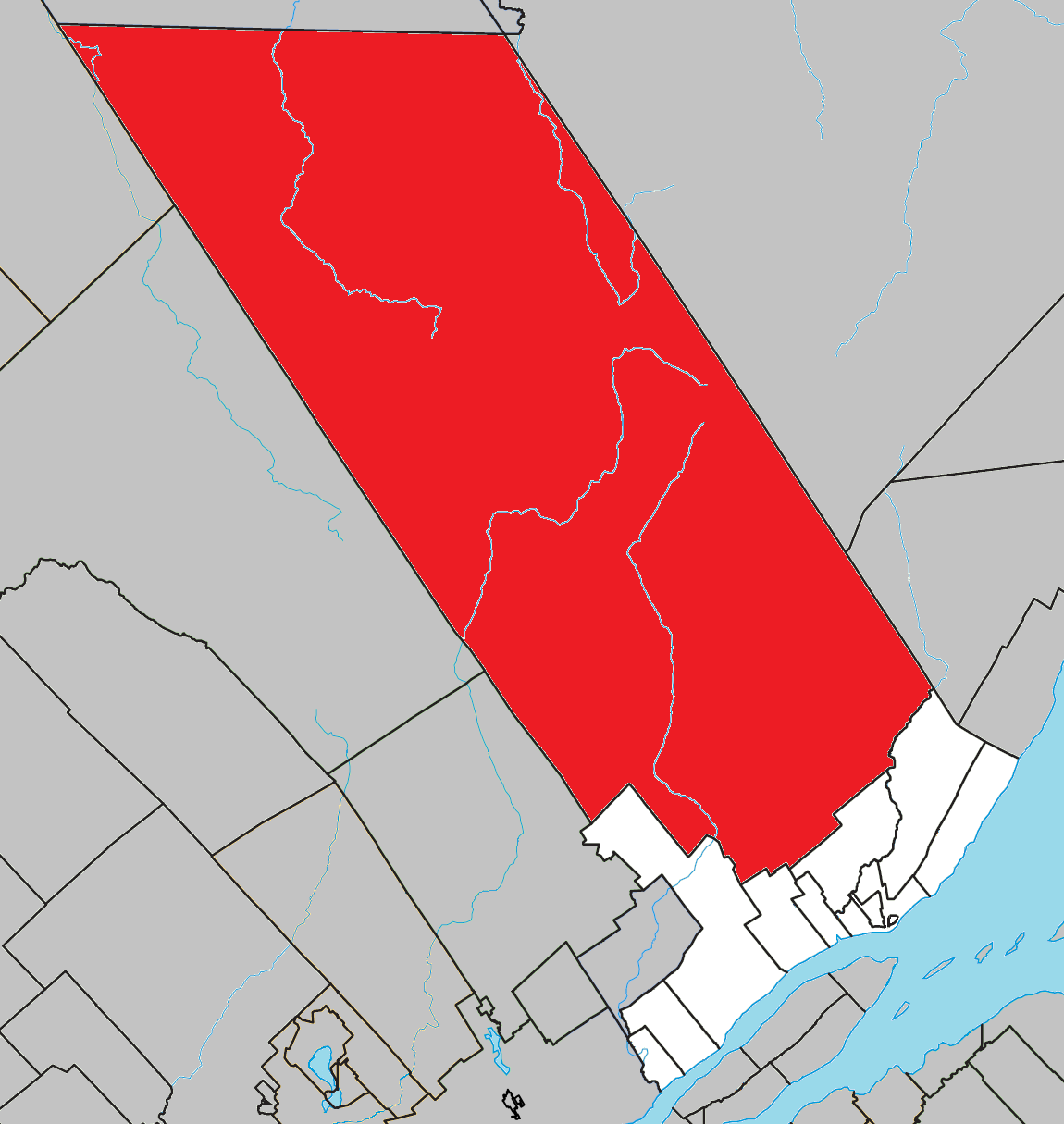
- Location within La Côte-de-Beaupré RCM

- Location in central Quebec
- Coordinates: 47°35′N 71°13′W
- Country: Canada
- Province: Quebec
- Region: Capitale-Nationale
- RCM: La Côte-de-Beaupré
- Constituted: January 1, 1986

Government
  - Federal riding: Montmorency—Charlevoix
  - Prov. riding: Charlevoix–Côte-de-Beaupré

Area
  - Total: 4,416.71 km^{2} (1,705.30 sq mi)
  - Land: 4,131.62 km^{2} (1,595.23 sq mi)

Population (2021)
  - Total: 0
  - Density: 0/km^{2} (0/sq mi)
- Time zone: UTC−5 (EST)
  - Summer (DST): UTC−4 (EDT)
- Highways: R-175

Lac-Jacques-Cartier (French pronunciation: [lak ʒak kaʁtje]) is a large unorganized territory in the Capitale-Nationale region of Quebec, Canada, in the La Côte-de-Beaupré Regional County Municipality, making up more than 85% of this regional county. It is unpopulated and undeveloped, almost entirely part of the Jacques-Cartier National Park and the Laurentides Wildlife Reserve.

Quebec Route 175 bisects the territory, and passes on the western shore of Jacques-Cartier Lake, after which the territory is named and source of the Jacques-Cartier River.

== Demographics ==
Historical census populations – Lac-Jacques-Cartier, Quebec

Year	Pop.	±%
1991	3	—
1996	0	−100.0%
2001	0	0.00%
2006	0	0.00%

Year	Pop.	±%
2011	0	0.00%
2016	0	0.00%
2021	0	0.00%

Source: Statistics Canada

== See also ==
- List of unorganized territories in Quebec
