= La Côte-de-Beaupré Regional County Municipality =

La Côte-de-Beaupré
- Regional county municipality
- Coordinates: 47°03′N 70°54′W
- Country: Canada
- Province: Quebec
- Region: Capitale-Nationale
- Effective: January 1, 1982
- County seat: Château-Richer

Government
  - Type: Prefecture
  - Prefect: Pierre Lefrançois

Area
  - Total: 5,065.16 km^{2} (1,955.67 sq mi)
  - Land: 4,845.19 km^{2} (1,870.74 sq mi)

Population (2021)
  - Total: 30,240
  - Density: 6.2/km^{2} (16/sq mi)
  - Change (2016-21): ▲7.2%
  - Dwellings: 15,487
- Time zone: UTC−5 (EST)
  - Summer (DST): UTC−4 (EDT)
- Area codes: 418 and 581
- Website: www.mrc cotedebeaupre.com

La Côte-de-Beaupré (French pronunciation: [la kot də bopʁe]) is a regional county municipality in the Capitale-Nationale region of Quebec, Canada. The seat is Château-Richer. Its most populous community is the municipality of Boischatel.

== Subdivisions ==
There are 11 subdivisions within the RCM:

Cities & Towns (3)

- Beaupré
- Château-Richer
- Sainte-Anne-de-Beaupré

Municipalities (4)

- Boischatel
- L'Ange-Gardien
- Saint-Ferréol-les-Neiges
- Saint-Tite-des-Caps

Parishes (2)

- Saint-Joachim
- Saint-Louis-de-Gonzague-du-Cap-Tourmente

Unorganized Territory (2)

- Lac-Jacques-Cartier
- Sault-au-Cochon

== Demographics ==
Canada census – La Côte-de-Beaupré Regional County Municipality community profile

	2021	2016
Population	30,240 (+7.2% from 2016)	28,199 (+7.7% from 2011)
Land area	4,845.19 km^{2} (1,870.74 sq mi)	4,865.97 km^{2} (1,878.76 sq mi)
Population density	6.2/km^{2} (16/sq mi)	5.8/km^{2} (15/sq mi)
Median age	45.6 (M: 45.2, F: 45.6)	45.0 (M: 44.6, F: 45.5)
Private dwellings	15,487 (total) 13,027 (occupied)	14,244 (total) 11,851 (occupied)
Median household income	$84,000	$71,277

References: 2021 2016

Historical census populations – La Côte-de-Beaupré Regional County Municipality

Year	Pop.	±%
1986	20,563	—
1991	21,214	+3.2%
1996	21,632	+2.0%
2001	20,984	−3.0%

Year	Pop.	±%
2006	23,015	+9.7%
2011	26,172	+13.7%
2016	28,199	+7.7%
2021	30,240	+7.2%

Source: Statistics Canada

== Transportation ==
=== Access Routes ===
Highways and numbered routes that run through the municipality, including external routes that start or finish at the county border:

- Autoroutes
  - None
- Principal Highways
  - R-138
  - R-175
- Secondary Highways
  - R-360
- External Routes
  - None

== See also ==
- List of regional county municipalities and equivalent territories in Quebec
