= List of Via Rail routes =

A route map of Via Rail frequencies from 2013.

Via Rail operates 497 trains per week over nineteen routes. Via groups these routes into three broad categories:

- Rapid Intercity Travel: daytime services over the Corridor between Ontario and Quebec. The vast majority of Via's trains–429 per week–operate here.
- Long-distance travel and tourism: the famous Canadian and Ocean, providing traditional transcontinental service.
- Mandatory Services: rural services mandated by the Canadian Government for areas which otherwise lack reasonable year-round transportation.

== Current routes ==
Name	Route	Route numbers	Notes
Canadian	Toronto – Vancouver	Westbound: 1 Eastbound: 2	
Ocean	Montreal – Quebec City (Charny) – Halifax	Westbound: 15; Eastbound: 14	
Québec City–Windsor Corridor	Toronto – Kingston – Montreal	Westbound: 61, 63, 65, 67, 69, 669; Eastbound: 60, 62, 64, 66, 68, 668	
Québec City–Windsor Corridor	Toronto – Kingston – Ottawa	Westbound: 41, 45, 47, 53, 55, 59, 643, 645; Eastbound: 40, 42, 44, 46, 48, 50, 52, 54	
Québec City–Windsor Corridor	Ottawa – Montreal – Quebec City	Westbound: 29, 31, 33, 35, 37, 39, 633; Eastbound: 20, 22, 24, 26, 28, 38, 622	
Québec City–Windsor Corridor	Toronto – Niagara Falls – New York (Maple Leaf)	Southbound: 97; Northbound: 98	Operated by Amtrak while in the US
Québec City–Windsor Corridor	Sarnia – London – Toronto	Westbound: 87; Eastbound: 84	
Québec City–Windsor Corridor	Windsor – London – Toronto	Westbound: 71, 73, 75, 79; Eastbound: 70, 72, 76, 78	
Jasper–Prince Rupert	Jasper – Prince Rupert	Westbound: 5 Eastbound: 6	Formerly the Skeena and Panorama
Montreal–Jonquière	Montreal – Jonquière	Southbound: 600, 602; Northbound: 601	Formerly the Saguenay
Montreal–Senneterre	Montreal – Senneterre	Southbound: 604, 606; Northbound: 603	Formerly the Abitibi
Sudbury–White River	Sudbury – White River	Westbound: 186; Eastbound: 185	Formerly the Lake Superior
Winnipeg–Churchill	Winnipeg – Churchill	Southbound: 690, 692; Northbound: 691, 693	Formerly the Hudson Bay and Northern Spirits
The Pas–Pukatawagan	The Pas – Pukatawagan	Southbound: 290; Northbound: 291	Operated by the Keewatin Railway

== Full listing ==
=== Intercity routes ===
Transferred from Canadian National Railway (CN) Transferred from CP Rail (now Canadian Pacific Kansas City) Active route

Name(s)	Route	First service	Last service	Notes
Atlantic Limited	Montreal – Sherbrooke – Saint John	October 29, 1978	June 16, 1979	Renamed as Atlantic
Atlantic	Montreal – Sherbrooke – Saint John	June 17, 1979	October 27, 1979	Extended to Halifax
Atlantic	Montreal – Sherbrooke – Saint John – Moncton – Halifax	October 28, 1979	November 14, 1981	
Atlantic	Montreal – Sherbrooke – Saint John – Moncton – Halifax	June 1, 1985	December 16, 1994	
Bras d'Or	Halifax – Sydney	2000	2004	Weekly summer tourist train
Calgary–South Edmonton	Calgary – Edmonton	October 29, 1978	October 26, 1985	
Campbellton–Moncton	Campbellton – Moncton	October 28, 1979	January 14, 1990	
Capreol–Winnipeg	Capreol – Hornepayne – Nakina	April 1, 1978	September 28, 1980	
Capreol–Winnipeg	Sioux Lookout – Winnipeg	April 1, 1978	September 28, 1980	Extended to Armstrong
Capreol–Winnipeg	Armstrong – Sioux Lookout – Winnipeg	September 29, 1980	November 14, 1981	
Capreol–Winnipeg	Capreol – Hornepayne – Nakina – Armstrong – Sioux Lookout – Winnipeg	October 28, 1979	May 31, 1981	Briefly rolled into the Super Continental during 1981
Capreol–Winnipeg	Capreol – Hornepayne – Nakina – Armstrong – Sioux Lookout – Winnipeg	November 15, 1981	January 14, 1990	Subsumed by the Canadian
Capreol–Winnipeg	Capreol – Hornepayne	June 1, 1981	November 14, 1981	
Capreol–Winnipeg	Farlane – Winnipeg			Seasonal train
Chambord–Dolbeau	Chambord – Dolbeau	April 1, 1978	June 16, 1979	
Chaleur	Montreal – Gaspé	April 1, 1978	April 30, 2009	Name dropped
Montreal–Gaspé	Montreal – Gaspé	May 1, 2009	August 2013	
Edmonton–Drumheller	Edmonton – Drumheller	April 1, 1978	November 14, 1981	Now partially served by Alberta Prairie Railway Excursions
Edmundston–Sainte-Foy	Edmundston – Sainte-Foy	April 1, 1978	October 27, 1979	
Enterprise	Toronto – Montreal	January 16, 2000	October 29, 2005	Night train
Evangeline	Halifax – Yarmouth	October 29, 1978	January 14, 1990	
Flin Flon–Osborne Lake	Flin Flon – Osborne Lake	April 1, 1978	October 27, 1979	
Halifax–Fredericton	Moncton – Saint John	April 1, 1978	October 27, 1979	Extended to Halifax
Halifax–Fredericton	Halifax – Moncton – Saint John	October 28, 1979	November 14, 1981	Extended to Fredericton
Halifax–Fredericton	Halifax – Moncton – Saint John	June 1, 1985	January 14, 1990	
Halifax–Fredericton	Halifax – Moncton – Saint John – Fredericton	November 15, 1981	May 31, 1985	Truncated back to Saint John
Halifax–Sydney	Halifax – Sydney	April 1, 1978	January 14, 1990	
Havelock–Toronto	Havelock – Peterborough – Toronto	October 29, 1978	January 14, 1990	
Hearst–Nakina	Hearst – Nakina	April 1, 1978	May 31, 1986	
Hornepayne–Manitouwadge	Hornepayne – Manitouwadge	April 1, 1978	April 26, 1980	
International Limited	Toronto – Chicago	October 31, 1982	June 12, 1983	Operated by Amtrak in the US. Renamed as International
International	Toronto – Chicago	June 13, 1983	April 23, 2004	Operated by Amtrak in the US
Jasper–Prince Rupert	Jasper – Prince Rupert	April 1, 1978	June 16, 1979	Named as Skeena
Jasper–Prince Rupert	Jasper – Prince Rupert	May 1, 2009	Present	
Skeena	Jasper – Prince Rupert	June 17, 1979	November 14, 1981	Extended to Edmonton
Skeena	Jasper – Prince Rupert	April 30, 1989	April 30, 2009	Name dropped
Skeena	Edmonton – Jasper – Prince Rupert	November 15, 1981	June 2, 1984	Extended to Winnipeg and renamed as Panorama
Skeena	Edmonton – Jasper – Prince Rupert	June 1, 1985	April 29, 1989	Truncated back to Jasper
Panorama	Winnipeg – Saskatoon – Edmonton – Jasper – Prince Rupert	June 3, 1984	May 31, 1985	Reverted to Skeena name and route
Limoilou–Rivière-à-Pierre	Limoilou, Quebec City – Rivière-à-Pierre	April 1, 1978	June 16, 1979	Replaced by Sainte-Foy–Rivière-à-Pierre train
Sainte-Foy–Rivière-à-Pierre	Sainte-Foy – Rivière-à-Pierre	October 28, 1979	February 2, 1980	
Toronto–Niagara Falls	Toronto – Niagara Falls	April 1, 1978	January 18, 1992	Renamed as General Brock
Toronto–Niagara Falls	Toronto – Niagara Falls	November 23, 1997	December 9, 2012	Service continued by the Maple Leaf and Lakeshore West line
General Brock	Toronto – Niagara Falls	January 19, 1992	November 22, 1997	Name dropped
Toronto–North Bay	Toronto – North Bay	April 1, 1978	January 14, 1990	
Maple Leaf	Toronto – Niagara Falls – New York	April 26, 1981	Present	Operated by Amtrak in the US
Moncton–Edmundston	Moncton – Edmundston	April 1, 1978	November 14, 1981	
Moncton–Edmundston	Moncton – Edmundston	October 28, 1984	January 14, 1990	
Montreal–Chicoutimi	Montreal – Hervey – Rivière-à-Pierre – Chambord – Jonquière – Chicoutimi	April 1, 1978	April 30, 1988	Truncated to Jonquière
Saguenay	Montreal – Hervey – Rivière-à-Pierre – Chambord – Jonquière	April 25, 1993	April 30, 2009	Name dropped
Montreal–Jonquière	Montreal – Hervey – Rivière-à-Pierre – Chambord – Jonquière	May 1, 1988	April 24, 1993	Named as Saguenay
Montreal–Jonquière	Montreal – Hervey – Rivière-à-Pierre – Chambord – Jonquière	May 1, 2009	Present	
Sainte-Foy–Cochrane	Sainte-Foy – Senneterre – Cochrane	April 1, 1978		
Abitibi	Montreal – Hervey – Senneterre	April 25, 1993	April 30, 2009	Name dropped
Montreal–Senneterre	Montreal – Hervey – Senneterre	May 1, 2009	Present	
Montreal–Sherbrooke	Montreal – Sherbrooke	April 1, 1978	October 30, 1982	
Ocean	Montreal – Halifax	April 1, 1978	Present	
Ottawa–Sudbury	Ottawa – Sudbury	November 15, 1981	May 31, 1985	Replaced a section of the Canadian when it was rerouted through Toronto following the first cancellation of the Super Continental
Saint-Laurent	Montreal – Mont-Joli	October 28, 1979	May 28, 1983	
Saint-Laurent	Quebec City – Mont-Joli	June 1, 1985	January 14, 1990	
Regina–Prince Albert	Regina – Saskatoon – Prince Albert	April 1, 1978	November 14, 1981	
Winnipeg–Saskatoon	Winnipeg – Regina – Saskatoon	November 15, 1981	June 2, 1984	Replaced a section of the cancelled Super Continental. Subsumed by the Panorama
Saskatoon–Edmonton	Saskatoon – Edmonton	November 15, 1981	June 2, 1984	Replaced a section of the cancelled Super Continental. Subsumed by the Panorama
Saskatoon–The Pas	Saskatoon – The Pas	April 1, 1978	April 26, 1980	
Scotian	Montreal – Campbellton – Halifax	April 1, 1978	October 27, 1979	Same route as the Ocean but with more stops
Senneterre–Rouyn-Noranda	Senneterre – Rouyn-Noranda	April 1, 1978	June 16, 1979	
Lake Superior	Sudbury – White River	April 28, 1996	April 30, 2009	Name dropped
Sudbury–White River	Sudbury – White River	October 29, 1978	April 27, 1996	Named as Lake Superior
Sudbury–White River	Sudbury – White River	May 1, 2009	Present	
Canadian	Toronto – Sudbury – White River – Winnipeg – Regina – Calgary – Banff – Vancouver	October 29, 1978	June 16, 1979	Exchanged sleeper cars with the Super Continental at Winnipeg
Canadian	Montreal – Ottawa – Sudbury – White River – Winnipeg – Regina – Calgary – Banff – Vancouver	June 17, 1979	October 27, 1979	Exchanged sleeper cars with the Super Continental at Winnipeg
Canadian	Montreal – Toronto – Sudbury – White River – Winnipeg – Regina – Calgary – Banff – Vancouver	November 15, 1981	May 31, 1985	
Canadian	Montreal – Ottawa – Sudbury – / Toronto – Sudbury – White River – Winnipeg – Regina – Calgary – Banff – Vancouver	June 1, 1985	January 14, 1990	Montreal and Toronto sections, divided at Sudbury
Canadian	Toronto – Sudbury Junction – Sioux Lookout – Winnipeg – Saskatoon – Edmonton – Jasper – Vancouver	January 15, 1990	Present	
Super Continental	Montreal – Ottawa – Sioux Lookout – Winnipeg – Saskatoon – Edmonton – Jasper – Vancouver	April 1, 1978	June 16, 1979	Exchanged sleeper cars with the Canadian at Winnipeg
Super Continental	Toronto – Sioux Lookout – Winnipeg – Saskatoon – Edmonton – Jasper – Vancouver	June 17, 1979	October 27, 1979	Exchanged sleeper cars with the Canadian at Winnipeg
Super Continental	Toronto – Sioux Lookout – Winnipeg – Saskatoon – Edmonton – Jasper – Vancouver	June 1, 1981	November 14, 1981	Exchanged sleeper cars with the Canadian at Winnipeg. Discontinued for the first time
Super Continental	Toronto – Sudbury – White River – Winnipeg – Saskatoon – Edmonton – Jasper – Vancouver	October 28, 1979	May 31, 1981	Combined with the Canadian between Sudbury and Winnipeg. Exchanged sleeper cars with the Canadian at Winnipeg
Super Continental	Winnipeg – Vancouver	June 1, 1985	January 14, 1990	Discontinued for the second and final time
The Pas–Lynn Lake	The Pas – Pukatawagan – Lynn Lake	April 1, 1978	May 22, 2004	Truncated to Pukatawagan
The Pas–Pukatawagan	The Pas – Pukatawagan	May 23, 2004	Present	Runs over the Keewatin Railway
Thunder Bay–Sioux Lookout	Thunder Bay – Sioux Lookout	April 1, 1978	May 31, 1986	
Toronto–Barrie	Toronto – Barrie	April 1, 1978	September 3, 1982	Replaced by the Bradford line (now the Barrie line)
Toronto–Stouffville	Toronto – Stouffville	April 1, 1978	September 3, 1982	Replaced by the Stouffville line
Malahat	Victoria – Courtenay	October 29, 1978	April 30, 2009	Name dropped
Victoria–Courtenay	Victoria – Courtenay	May 1, 2009	March 19, 2011	
Winnipeg–Churchill, Hudson Bay, Northern Spirits	Winnipeg – The Pas – Churchill	April 1, 1978	Present	

=== Commuter routes ===
Via operated some grandfathered commuter passenger routes from CN and CP from 1977 until financial constraints led to cuts in 1981. A few became provincial commuter rail lines after transfer from Canadian National Railways or Canadian Pacific Railway.

Route	Original Operator	Notes
CN Uxbridge Subdivision (Stouffville line)	CN	Toronto to Stouffville service by CN from 1971 to 1977, Via until 1981 and was restored by GO Transit in 1982
Guelph Subdivision(Toronto - Stratford/Georgetown)	CN	Never transferred to Via in 1977 but became GO Georgetown line in 1974. Extended to Guelph 1990 to 1993 (cut back to Georgetown by provincial cuts) and extended to Kitchener (line renamed) since 2011
Barrie line	CN	Began by CN Toronto-Barrie from 1972 to 1977, transferred to Via 1977 and became GO line to Bradford/Newmarket only from 1982 to 1990 and again from 1993 to 2008, extended to Barrie from 1990 to 1993 and since 2008 (now to Allendale)
CP Havelock Subdivision (Havelock/Peterborough)	CP	Retained as CP freight subdivision and now used by Kawartha Lakes Railway
Streetsville	CP	Abandoned in 1971 and partially restored as GO Milton line 1981
Lakeshore West	CP	Transferred from Via to STCUM in 1982 and then to AMT in 1996, now Exo
Deux-Montagnes line	CN	Transferred from Via to STCUM in 1982 and then to AMT in 1996. Last operated by Exo. Ceased operations in 2020 and replaced in 2023 by Réseau express métropolitain (REM) light metro line.
Saint-Jérôme line	CP	Transferred from CP to Via in 1977 but abandoned 1981. Restored by AMT in 1997, now Exo.
Mont-Saint-Hilaire line	CN	Never transferred to Via and operated by CN until 1988 and later restored by AMT in 2000, now Exo.
