= List of named passenger trains of Canada =

This article contains a list of named passenger trains in Canada.

Train Name	Railroad	Train Endpoints in a typical [year]	Operated
Abitibi	Via Rail	Montreal, QC – Senneterre, QC [1998]	1993-2009 (train still operates)
Acadian	Canadian National	Montreal, QC – Halifax, NS [1928]	1927-1930
Adirondack	Amtrak	New York, NY – Montreal, QC [1980]	1974–present
Adirondack and Montreal Express	New York Central	New York, NY – Montreal, QC [1916]	1893-1895; 1902-1922
Afternoon Puget Sounder	Great Northern	Seattle, WA – Vancouver, BC [1948]	1946-1950
Alberta Express	Canadian Northern Railway	Winnipeg, MB – Edmonton, AB [1910]	1910-1915
Alouette	Boston & Maine, Canadian Pacific	Boston, MA – Montreal, QC [1934]	1926-1964
The Ambassador	Canadian National, Central Vermont, Boston & Maine, and New Haven	Montreal, QC – Boston, MA [1963]	1927-1966
Ambassador	Via Rail	Toronto, ON – Windsor, ON [1982]	1982-1984
American	Great Northern	Seattle, WA – Vancouver, BC [1927]	1919-1946
Apple Blossom Special	Via Rail	Halifax, HS – Kentville, NS [1987]	1987
Atlantic	Via Rail	Halifax, NS – Montreal, QC [1993]	1979–1981; 1985-1994
Atlantic Express	Canadian Pacific	Vancouver, BC – Montreal, QC (eastbound) [1910]	1886-1911
Atlantic Express	Canadian National Railway	Chicago, IL – Toronto, ON [1928]	1926-1930
Atlantic Express	Grand Trunk Western	Chicago, IL – Montreal, QC [1913]	1879-1917
Atlantic Limited	Canadian Pacific; Via Rail	Saint John, NB – Montreal, QC [1956]	CPR: 1955–1978; Via: 1978-1979
Atlantic Limited	Minneapolis, St. Paul and Sault Ste. Marie, Canadian Pacific	Minneapolis–Saint Paul – Montreal, QC [1908]	1902-1909
Bluenose	Canadian National	Edmonton, AB – Halifax, NS	1956-?
Bonaventure	Canadian National, Via Rail from 1977	Toronto, ON – Montreal, QC	1965-1997
Boston Express	Minneapolis, St. Paul and Sault Ste. Marie, Canadian Pacific	Minneapolis–Saint Paul, MN – Montreal, QC [1908]	1898-1910
Bras d'Or	Via Rail	Halifax, NS – Sydney, NS [2000]	2000-2004
Buffalo Express	Lehigh Valley Railroad, Grand Trunk Western Railroad	Toronto, ON – Buffalo, NY [1905]	1902-1914
Buffalo – Toronto Express	New York Central, Canadian Pacific	New York, NY – Toronto, ON [1945]	1943-1963
Bytowner	Canadian National	Montreal, QC – Ottawa, ON [1965]	1965-1967
Cabot	Canadian National	Truro, NS – Sydney, NS [1975]	1967-1979
Canadian	New York Central, Toronto, Hamilton and Buffalo Railway	New York, NY – Toronto, ON [1916]	1913-1942
Canadian	New York Central; Canadian Pacific	Chicago, IL – Toronto, ON [1963]	1961-1964
Canadian	Great Northern	Seattle, WA - Vancouver, BC [1930]	1919-1946
The Canadian	Canadian Pacific; Via Rail	Montreal, QC/Toronto, ON – Vancouver, BC [1995]	CPR: 1955–1978; Via: 1978–present
Canadian-Niagara	New York Central	Chicago, IL – Toronto, ON [1948]	1946-1961
Capital	Canadian National, Via Rail from 1978	Toronto, ON – Ottawa, ON [1970]	1968-1971; 1978-2009
Capital Cities Express	Canadian Northern Railway, then Canadian National Railway	Winnipeg, MB – Prince Albert, SK [1915]	1911-1920
Capital City	Canadian National	Toronto, ON – Ottawa, ON [1925]	1921-1927
Cariboo Prospector	Pacific Great Eastern BC Rail	Vancouver, BC – Prince George, BC (aka 'Cariboo Dayliner') [1965]	1956-2002
The Caribou	Canadian National	Port aux Basques, NL – St. John's, NL	1950-1969
Cascades (group of trains)	Amtrak	Portland, OR – Vancouver, BC	1995–present
Cavalier	Canadian National; Via Rail from 1978	Toronto, ON – Montreal, QC [1966]	1965-1989
Chaleur	Canadian National	Montreal, QC – Campbellton, NB [1965]	1964-1974
Chaleur	Via Rail	Montreal, QC – Gaspé, QC [1985]	1982-2009 (service suspended in 2013)
Champlain	Canadian National/Canadian Pacific; Via Rail from 1982	Montreal, QC – Quebec City, QC [1965]	1964-1966; 1982-2009
Chateau Champlain	Canadian Pacific	Toronto, ON – Montreal, QC [1965]	1965
Chaudière	Via Rail	Montreal, QC – Quebec City, QC [1995]	1993-2009
Chicago Express	New York Central; Canadian Pacific	Chicago, IL – Montreal, QC [1950]	1903-1910; 1931-1960
Chicago – Toronto Express	Lehigh Valley Railroad, Grand Trunk Western Railroad	New York, NY - Philadelphia, PA - Toronto, ON - Chicago, IL [1908]	1908-1915; 1925-1928
Chinook	Canadian Pacific	Calgary, AB – Edmonton, AB [1945]	1942-1954
Citadel	Canadian National	Montreal, QC – Quebec City, QC [1930]	1926-1934
Citadelle	Via Rail	Montreal, QC – Quebec City, QC [1985]	1982-2009
Cleveland Mail	New York Central	Cleveland, OH – Toronto, ON [1945]	1942-1948
Connecticut Yankee	Boston and Maine, New York, New Haven and Hartford, Quebec Central Railway	Boston, MA & New York, NY - Sherbrooke, QC - Quebec City, QC [1946]	1936-ca. 1952
Continental Limited	Canadian National	Montreal, QC – Vancouver, BC [1948]	1921-1955
Continental	Canadian National	Montreal, QC – Vancouver, BC [1960]	1955-1963
Day Express	Canadian Pacific	Toronto, ON – Montreal, QC [1940]	1939-1944
Dominion	Canadian Pacific, Michigan Central Railroad	Montreal, QC/Toronto, ON – Chicago, IL [1916]	1915-1920
The Dominion	Canadian Pacific	Montreal, QC/Toronto, ON – Vancouver, BC [1948]	1929-1966
Dominion-Overseas	Michigan Central Railroad, Canadian Pacific	Chicago, IL - Montreal, QC [1937]	1923-1942
Down Easter	New Haven, Boston & Maine, Maine Central, Canadian Pacific, and Canadian National	New York, NY - Portland, ME (with through cars to Halifax, NS) [1927]	1927-1942; 1949-1950
Duluth Express	Canadian Northern Railway	Winnipeg, MB – Duluth, MN [1912]	1911-1914
Eastern Flyer	Grand Trunk Railway, Canadian National	Montreal, QC – Detroit, MI [1926]	1902-1906; 1926-1930
Enterprise	Via Rail	Toronto, ON – Montreal, QC	2000-2005
Erie	Via Rail	Toronto, ON – Windsor, ON [1985]	1982-2009
Eskimo	Canadian Pacific	Calgary, AB – Edmonton, AB [1955]	1950-1960
Evangeline Dayliner	Dominion Atlantic Railway	Yarmouth, NS – Halifax, NS [1958]	1956-1978
Evangeline	Via Rail	Yarmouth, NS – Halifax, NS [1983]	1978-1990
Exec	Via Rail	Ottawa, ON – Toronto, ON [1983]	1981-1989
Executive	Canadian National; Via Rail from 1978	Ottawa, ON – Toronto, ON [1975]	1973-1980
Expedo	Canadian National	Port aux Basques, NL – St. John's, NL [1970]	1969-1974
Expo Limited	Canadian Pacific	Montreal, QC/Toronto, ON – Vancouver, BC [1967]	1967
Flying Bluenose	Dominion Atlantic Railway	Halifax, NS – Yarmouth, NS [1920]	1891-1936
Foreign Express	Newfoundland Railway	Port aux Basques, NL – St. John's, NL [1920]	1898-1928
Forest City	Canadian National, Via Rail	Toronto, ON – Sarnia, ON [1960] Toronto, ON – London, ON [1990]	1956-1961 1988-1997
Fort Macleod	Canadian Pacific	Calgary, AB – Lethbridge, AB [1967]	1967-1971
Fraser Executive	White Pass and Yukon Route	Skagway, AK – Fraser, BC [1982]	1982
Frontenac	Canadian Pacific; Via Rail from 1982	Montreal, QC – Quebec City, QC [1925]	1921-1971, 1982-1997
Gatineau	Canadian National Railway, Via Rail from 1991	Montreal, QC – Ottawa, ON [1993]	1965-1967, 1991-1997
General Brock	Via Rail	Toronto, ON – Niagara Falls, ON [1994]	1992-1997
Great Laker	Via Rail	Toronto, ON – Windsor, ON [1982]	1982
Great Lakes Special	Canadian National	Winnipeg, MB – Port Arthur, ON [1935]	1935-1936, 1940
Great West	Canadian Pacific	Winnipeg, MB – Edmonton, AB [1940]	1939-1960
Green Mountain Flyer	Boston & Maine, New York Central Railroad, Rutland, and Canadian National	Boston, MA/New York, NY - Montreal, QC [1930]	1892-1896; 1900–1917; 1928-1953
The Gull	Canadian National; Canadian Pacific; Maine Central; Boston & Maine	Halifax, NS – Boston, MA [1933]	1929-1960
Halifax Express	Canadian Pacific	Montreal, QC – Halifax, NS [1904]	1903-1910
Highlander	Canadian National	Toronto, ON – Haliburton, ON [1952]	before and after 1952
Hudson Bay	Via Rail	Winnipeg, MB – Churchill, MB [2006]	1979-2009 (train still operates)
Huron	Via Rail	Sarnia, ON – Toronto, ON [1991]	1991-1997
Imperial Limited	Canadian Pacific	Montreal, QC/Toronto, ON – Vancouver, BC (called 'Imperial' from 1919) [1912]	1899-1933
Inter-City Limited	Grand Trunk Western; Canadian National	Chicago, IL – Montreal, QC [1948]	1929-1963
International	Amtrak and Via Rail	Chicago, IL – Toronto, ON (aka 'International Limited') [1985]	1982-2004
International	Great Northern	Seattle, WA – Vancouver, BC [1955]	1950-1971
International Limited	Grand Trunk Western, Canadian National	Chicago, IL – Toronto, ON [1955]	1901-1910; 1919-1971
International Limited	Great Northern	Portland, OR – Vancouver, BC [1945]	1911-1924, 1931-1946
Jasper Park Special	Canadian National, Chicago and North Western	Chicago, IL – Vancouver, BC – Prince Rupert, BC [1932]	1932
Kettle Valley Express	Canadian Pacific	Medicine Hat, AB – Vancouver, BC [1935]	1931-1964
Kootenay Express	Canadian Pacific	Medicine Hat, AB – Vancouver, BC [1935]	1931-1964
The La Salle	Canadian National	Chicago, IL – Montreal, QC [1940]	1937-1963
La Salle	Via Rail	Toronto, ON – Montreal, QC [1986]	1982-1997
Lake Shore Express	Canadian National	Montreal, QC – Toronto, ON [1952]	1952-1955
Lake Superior	Via Rail	Greater Sudbury, ON - White River, ON [2000]	2000-2009 (train still operates)
Lake Superior Express	Canadian Northern Railway	Winnipeg, MB – Port Arthur, ON [1912]	1911-1915
Lakeshore	Canadian National Railway, Via Rail from 1978	Montreal, QC – Toronto, ON [1983]	1965-1997
Laurentian	Delaware & Hudson, New York Central, Canadian Pacific	New York, NY – Montreal, QC [1948]	1923-1971
Laurier	Canadian National Railway, Via Rail from 1982	Montreal, QC – Ottawa, ON [1985]	1965-1967, 1982-1997
Little Bear	Ontario Northland Railway	Cochrane, ON – Moosonee, ON [1955]	1932-2007
Malahat	Via Rail	Victoria, BC – Courtenay, BC [1989]	1987-2009 (service suspended 2011)
Manitoba Express	Minneapolis, St. Paul and Sault Ste. Marie and Canadian Pacific	Minneapolis–St. Paul, MN – Winnipeg, MB [1905]	1904-1918
Manitoba Limited	Northern Pacific Railway	St. Paul, Minnesota – Winnipeg, MB [1930]	1914-1915, 1921-1946
Maple Leaf	Grand Trunk Western and Canadian National	Montreal, QC/Toronto, ON – Chicago, IL [1938]	1927-1971
Maple Leaf	Lehigh Valley, Reading Company; Canadian National	New York, NY – Philadelphia, PA – Toronto, ON [1940]	1937-1960
Maple Leaf	Amtrak and Via Rail	New York, NY – Toronto, ON [1985]	1981–present
Maritime Express	Intercolonial (1898-1918); Canadian National (1918-1965)	Montreal, QC – Halifax, NS [1948]	1898-1965
Meridian	Via Rail	Toronto, ON – Montreal, QC [1982]	1982-1997
Metropolis	Via Rail	Montreal, QC – Toronto, ON [1993]	1992-1997
Michigan	Canadian Pacific, New York Central Railroad	Chicago, Illinois – Toronto, ON [1934]	1928-1957
Midnight	Dominion Atlantic Railway	Halifax, NS – Yarmouth, NS	?
Mohawk	Grand Trunk Western	Chicago, IL – Detroit, MI [1970]	1967-1971
Mohawk	Via Rail	Toronto, ON – Windsor, ON [1986]	1982-1997
Montreal	Canadian National	Montreal, QC – Quebec City, QC [1925]	1923-1934
Montreal and Boston Express	Soo Line Railroad, Canadian Pacific, Boston and Maine	Minneapolis–Saint Paul, MN – Boston, MA [1916]	1890-1893; 1903-1916
Montreal Express	New York Central, Rutland Railroad, Delaware and Hudson Railway	NY – Montreal, QC [1916]	1902-1924
Montreal Express	Canadian Pacific, Wabash Railroad	Chicago, IL – Toronto, ON – Montreal, QC [1903]	1903-1909
Montreal Express	Grand Trunk Western Railroad, Boston and Maine	Chicago, IL – Montreal, QC – Boston, MA [1916]	1908-1917
Montreal Limited	Delaware & Hudson, New York Central	New York, NY – Montreal, QC [1948]	1925-1971
Montrealer	Canadian National Railways, Central Vermont, Boston and Maine; New Haven, Pennsylvania Railroad	Montreal, QC – Washington, DC (the southbound name is the 'Washingtonian') [1952]	1924-1966
Montrealer	Amtrak	Montreal, QC – Washington, DC (the southbound name is the 'Washingtonian') [1981]	1972-1995
Moose Jaw Express	Canadian Pacific	Winnipeg, MB – Moose Jaw, SK [1911]	1911-1913
Morning Puget Sounder	Great Northern	Seattle, WA – Vancouver, BC [1947]	1946-1950
Mount Baker International	Amtrak	Seattle, WA – Vancouver, BC [1996]	1996-1997
Mount Royal	New York Central, Boston & Maine, Rutland, and Canadian National	New York, NY – Montreal, QC – Boston, MA [1952]	1925-1953
Mount Royal	Canadian National	Montreal, QC – Quebec City, QC [1925]	1925-1934
The Mountaineer	Soo Line	Minneapolis–Saint Paul, MN – Vancouver, BC	1920-1960
National	Grand Trunk Railway, then Canadian National Railway	Toronto, ON – Windsor, ON [1918]	1915-1931
New England Express	Boston and Maine, Canadian Pacific	Boston, MA–Montreal, QC [1903]	1903-1910
New England States Limited	Central Vermont Railway, Boston and Maine, New York, New Haven and Hartford Railroad	New York, NY–Montreal, QC–Boston, MA [1916]	1906-1917
New Englander	Central Vermont Railway, Boston and Maine, Canadian National Railway	Boston, MA–Montreal, QC [1948]	1927-1953
New York Express	New York Central, Rutland Railroad	New York, NY–Montreal, QC [1916]	1913-1918
New Yorker	Dominion Atlantic Railway	Halifax, NS – Yarmouth, NS [1930]	1927-1942
Niagara Rainbow	Amtrak	New York, NY–Detroit, MI (in later years the endpoint was Niagara Falls or Toronto) [1967]	1974-1995
Night Express	New York Central, Rutland Railroad, Canadian Pacific	New York, NY–Montreal, QC (with through cars to Ottawa, ON) [1903]	1900-1912
Night Express	Central Vermont, Boston and Maine	Boston, MA–Montreal, QC [1916]	1911-1918
Night Express	Canadian Northern Railway	Regina, SK – Prince Albert, SK [1913]	1913-1914
Night Express	Canadian Pacific	Montreal, QC – Quebec City, QC [1935]	1932-1938
North Shore Limited	New York Central	New York, NY–Chicago, IL; Toronto, ON-Chicago, IL [1948]	1884-1897; 1902–1905; 1921-1963
Northern Express	New York Central, Delaware and Hudson Railway, Central Vermont Railway	New York, NY–Montreal, QC [1892]	1890-1901
Northland	Canadian National; Via Rail (from 1978)	Toronto, ON – Kapuskasing, ON [1948]	1937-1989
Northlander	Ontario Northland Railway	Toronto, ON – Cochrane, ON [1983]	1976-2012
Ocean			see 'Ocean Limited'
Ocean Limited	Intercolonial, Canadian Government Railways, then Canadian National. Via Rail from 1978. Called 'Ocean' from 1966	Montreal, QC – Halifax NS [2013]	1904–present
Ontarian	New York Central, Toronto, Hamilton and Buffalo Railway, Canadian Pacific	New York, NY–Toronto, ON [1966]	1938-1960; 1964-1967
Ontarian	Canadian National; Via Rail from 1978	Toronto, ON – Kingston, ON[1966]	1966-1989
Ontarian-Lake Erie	New York Central, Toronto, Hamilton and Buffalo Railway, Canadian Pacific	New York, NY–Toronto, ON–Cleveland, OH [1942]	1942-1946
Ontario Limited	Canadian National	Montreal, QC – Toronto, ON [1933]	1930-1936
Ottawa Express	Canadian National	Montreal, QC – Ottawa, ON [1926]	1897-1899, 1926-1928
Overland Limited	Newfoundland Railway	Port aux Basques, NL – St. John's, NL [1935]	1928-1949
Overseas	New York Central; Canadian Pacific	Montreal, QC–Detroit, MI [1952]	1929-1960
Owl	Great Northern	Vancouver, BC–Portland, OR [1925]	1910-1930
Owl	Canadian National	Saskatoon, SK – Regina, SK [1928]	1926-1957
Pacific Coast Express	Soo Line Railroad, Canadian Pacific	Chicago, IL – Vancouver, BC [1916]	1911-1916
Pacific Express	Canadian Pacific	Montreal, QC – Vancouver, BC (westbound) [1903]	1886-1911, 1924
Pacific International	Amtrak	Seattle, WA – Vancouver, BC [1975]	1972-1981
Pacific Limited	Grand Trunk Western	Chicago, IL – Montreal, QC [1971]	1971
Panorama	Canadian National	Montreal, QC/Toronto, ON – Vancouver, BC [1965]	1964-1969
Panorama	Via Rail	Winnipeg, MB – Prince Rupert, BC [1984]	1984
Pine Tree Acadian	Boston & Maine, Maine Central, Canadian Pacific, Canadian National	Boston, MA – Halifax, NS [1929]	1929
Point Pelee	Via Rail	Toronto, ON – Windsor, ON [1988]	1985-1997
Polar Bear Express	Ontario Northland Railway	Cochrane, ON – Moosonee, ON [1975]	1964–present
Premier	Canadian National	Montreal, QC – Toronto, ON [1965]	1965-1966
Prince Albert Express	Canadian Northern Railway	Winnipeg, MB – Prince Albert, SK [1910]	1910
Quebec	Canadian National	Montreal, QC – Quebec City, QC [1930]	1923-1934
Queen City	Canadian National	Ottawa, ON – Toronto, ON [1924]	1921-1927
Rapido (group of trains)	Canadian National; Via Rail from 1978	Montreal, QC – Toronto, ON [1965]	1965-1981
Red Wing	Boston and Maine, Canadian Pacific	Boston, MA–Montreal, QC [1953]	1927-1958
Renaissance	Via Rail	Montreal, QC – Toronto, ON [1985]	1982-1997
Rideau	Via Rail	Ottawa, ON – Montreal, QC [1968] Ottawa, ON – Toronto, ON [1989]	1966-1970, 1982–1984, 1989-1997
Rocky Mountaineer (excursion train)	Rocky Mountaineer	Four routes in the Rocky Mountains	1990–present
Royal Canadian Pacific (excursion train)	Canadian Pacific	Calgary, AB – Rocky Mountains	2000–present
Royal Hudson (excursion train)	BC Rail	North Vancouver, BC – Squamish, BC	1974-2001
Royal York	Canadian Pacific	Montreal, QC – Toronto, ON – Detroit, MI [1952]	1929-1965
St. Clair	Via Rail	Toronto, ON – Sarnia, ON [1985]	1982-1999
Saint-Laurent	Via Rail	Montreal, QC – Mont-Joli, QC [1981]	1980-1982, 1993-2009
St. Lawrence Special	Canadian National; Canada and Gulf Terminal Railway	Montreal, QC – Metis Beach, QC [1952]	1921–1922, 1935–1937, 1952-1957
St. Paul Express	Canadian Pacific	Sault Ste. Marie, MI – Montreal, QC [1900]	1898-1902
St. Paul-Minneapolis-Montreal Express	Minneapolis, St. Paul and Sault Ste. Marie Railroad, Canadian Pacific	Minneapolis, MN–Montreal, QC [1919]	1918-1925
St. Paul, Minneapolis and Duluth Express	Minneapolis, St. Paul and Sault Ste. Marie Railroad, Canadian Pacific	Minneapolis, MN–Montreal, QC [1903]	1903-1910
Saguenay	Via Rail	Montreal, QC – Jonquière, QC [1995]	1993–present
Saskatchewan Express	Canadian Northern Railway, then Canadian National Railway	Prince Albert, SK – Regina, SK – Saskatoon, SK [1910]	1910-1920
Scenic	Canadian Pacific	Montreal, QC/Toronto, ON – Vancouver, BC [1955]	1955
The Scotian	Canadian National; Via Rail	Montreal, QC – Halifax, NS	1941-1979; 1979-1985
Senator	Via Rail	Ottawa, ON – Toronto, ON [1997]	1997
Shore Line Express	Great Northern	Portland, OR–Vancouver, BC [1915]	1911-1918
Simcoe	Via Rail	Montreal, QC – Toronto, ON [1985]	1982-1997
Skeena	Via Rail	Prince Rupert, BC – Edmonton, AB [1980]	1980–present
Soo Express	Soo Line and Canadian Pacific	Montreal, QC–Minneapolis–Saint Paul, MN [1915]	1911-1918; 1929-1933
Soo-Dominion	Soo Line and Canadian Pacific	Minneapolis–Saint Paul, MN–Vancouver, British Columbia [1948]	1932-1960
Soo-Pacific Express	Soo Line and Canadian Pacific	Minneapolis–Saint Paul, MN – Moose Jaw, SK [1920]	1919-1931
Stampeder	Canadian Pacific	Calgary, AB – Edmonton, AB [1955]	1950-1960
Steamboat Express	Canadian National	Toronto, ON – Sarnia, ON [1938]	1935-1940
Super Continental	Canadian National; Via Rail from 1977	Montreal, QC/Toronto, ON – Vancouver, BC [1958]	1955–1981; 1985-1990
Toronto Express	Canadian Pacific	Toronto, ON – Vancouver, BC [1913]	1909-1913
Toronto Express	Canadian National	Toronto, ON – London, ON [1940]	1938-1941
Toronto Limited	New York Central, Toronto, Hamilton and Buffalo Railway, Canadian Pacific	New York, NY–Toronto, ON (with through cars to other destinations) [1930]	1925-1931
Toronto-Buffalo Express	New York Central, Toronto, Hamilton and Buffalo Railway, Canadian Pacific	New York, NY–Toronto, ON (1952]	1943-1963
Trans-Canada	Canadian Pacific	Toronto, ON – Vancouver, BC [1918]	1915-1922
Trent	Via Rail	Toronto, ON – Kingston, ON [1997]	1997
Trillium	Via Rail	Toronto, ON – Windsor, ON [1988]	1982-1997
Vancouver Express	Canadian Pacific	Toronto, ON – Vancouver, BC [1912]	1911-1914, 1919-1928
Vanier	Via Rail	Montreal, QC – Ottawa, ON [1994]	1992-1997
Viger	Canadian Pacific	Montreal, QC – Quebec City, QC [1930]	1921-1971
Ville-Marie	Via Rail	Montreal, QC – Ottawa, ON [1994]	1982-1997
Vulcan	Canadian Pacific	Calgary, AB – Lethbridge, AB [1968]	1967-1971
Washingtonian	Canadian National Railways, Central Vermont, Boston and Maine; New Haven, Pennsylvania Railroad	Montreal, QC – Washington, DC (the northbound name is the 'Montrealer') [1952]	1924-1966
Washingtonian	Amtrak	Montreal, QC – Washington, DC (the northbound name is the 'Montrealer') [1981]	1972-1995
Western Express	Canadian Pacific	Montreal, QC/Toronto, ON – Chicago, IL [1903]	1903-1906
Whistler Sea to Sky Climb	Rocky Mountaineer	North Vancouver, BC - Whistler, BC	2006–2015; formerly known as the Whistler Mountaineer
Winnipeg Express	Minneapolis, St. Paul and Sault Ste. Marie and Canadian Pacific	Minneapolis–St. Paul, MN – Winnipeg, MB [1925]	1909-1928
Winnipeg Limited	Great Northern	Minneapolis–St. Paul, MN – Winnipeg, MB [1948]	1906-1971
The Winnipeger	Minneapolis, St. Paul and Sault Ste. Marie (1928–1960), Soo Line (1961–1967) and Canadian Pacific	Minneapolis–St. Paul, MN – Winnipeg, MB [1935]	1928-1967
Wolverine	New York Central	Chicago, IL – Detroit, MI – Windsor, ON - St. Thomas, ON - New York, NY [1948]	1906-1967
York	Via Rail	Montreal, QC – Toronto, ON [1985]	1982-1997
