= Ouiatchouan Lake =

Lake in Quebec, Canada

- Location within Quebec
- Location: Lac-Bouchette, Le Domaine-du-Roy Regional County Municipality, Saguenay-Lac-Saint-Jean, Quebec, Canada
- Coordinates: 48°16′22″N 72°11′02″W
- Type: Natural
- Primary inflows: (clockwise from the mouth) Ouiatchouan River
- Primary outflows: Ouiatchouan River
- Basin countries: Canada
- Max. length: 2.1 kilometres (1.3 mi)
- Max. width: 0.9 kilometres (0.56 mi)
- Surface elevation: 307 metres (1,007 ft)
- Settlements: Baie-Comeau

The Lac Ouiatchouan (old appellation: Lac Ouiatchouane) is a body of fresh water located in ranges V and V1, in the municipality of Lac-Bouchette, in the MRC Le Domaine-du-Roy Regional County Municipality, in the administrative region Saguenay–Lac-Saint-Jean, in the province of Quebec, in Canada. This lake located in the heart of the village of Lac-Bouchette is characterized by recreational and tourist activities, in an agricultural and forestry environment.

== Geography ==
Located in the township of Dablon, lac Ouiatchouan extends from ranges V to range VI. With a length of 2.1 km (1.3 mi) in the north–south direction and a maximum width of 0.9 km (0.56 mi), Ouiatchouane Lake turns out to be a bulge of the Ouiatchouan River. It receives its water through the channel located to the southwest which connects it to lac Bouchette. End to end, these two twinned lakes form a body of water 6.3 km (3.9 mi) long. A narrow 0.5 km isthmus which is crossed on the west side by a channel of about 250 m long designated the "Pass", separates the lakes Bouchette and Ouiatchouane. The Hermitage road crosses this isthmus from East to West, towards the Ermitage Saint-Antoine located west of the lake, near the Ouiatchouan River.

The waters supplying Lake Ouiatchouan come from Lac des Commissaires, which flows into the Rivière des Commissaires which flows for 3 km north-east at the limit of ranges V1 and V11. The plans of the Mapping Service of the Ministry of Energy and Resources of the Government of Quebec indicate this segment of the river as the Ouiatchouan River. This river flows into the lac Bouchette, which flows into Lake Ouiatchouane.

Lake Ouiatchouane has three islands, the main of which is Montmorency Island located in the northern part of the lake, facing the mouth of the lake. The Qui-Mène-du-Train river flows on the eastern shore of Lake Ouiatchouan, in the heart of the village of Lac-Bouchette.

Ouiatchouan River

The mouth of Lake Ouiatchouan drains from the northwest to the bottom of a bay (0.7 km deep) in the Ouiatchouan River. This river flows 28 km north to reach Lac Saint-Jean, 6.5 km northwest of the intersection of route 155 and route 169. The Ouiatchouan river flows mainly in the woods, except the last two kilometres of its route which are agricultural in nature.

Route 155 and Railway

The route 155, connecting La Tuque and Chambord (Lac Saint-Jean), runs along the eastern part of lakes Bouchette and Ouiatchouan. This road crosses the village of Lac-Bouchette, which is located on the east shore of these two lakes. The path to Lake Ouiatchouan bypasses North Lake Yesatchouan. The Canadian National railroad runs along Lake Ouiatchouan on the west side, between the village and the north end of the lake.

== Toponymy ==
This toponym was registered on September 5, 1985, at the Place Names Bank of the Commission de toponymie du Québec.

== See also ==
- Lac Saint-Jean
- Ouiatchouan River
- Lac-Bouchette, municipality
- Le Domaine-du-Roy Regional County Municipality
- Lac des Commissaires
- Lac Bouchette
