= Ouananiche River =

Location
- Country: Canada
- Province: Quebec
- Region: Saguenay-Lac-Saint-Jean
- MRC: Le Domaine-du-Roy Regional County Municipality
- TNO or Municipality: Roberval

Physical characteristics
- Source: Brassard Lake
  - location: Roberval
  - coordinates: 48°27′41″N 72°17′13″W
  - elevation: 301 m (988 ft)
- Mouth: Lac Saint-Jean
  - location: Roberval
  - coordinates: 48°27′35″N 72°11′06″W
  - elevation: 101 m (331 ft)
- Length: 10.8 km (6.7 mi)

Basin features
- Progression: Lac Saint-Jean, Saguenay River
- Tributaries
  - left: (upstream)
  - right: (upstream) unidentified stream, outlet of Lac des Soeurs, outlet of two unidentified lakes, outlet of Lac du Quatre and Lac Parent.

The Ouananiche River is a tributary of lac Saint-Jean, flowing the territory of the town of Roberval, in the Le Domaine-du-Roy Regional County Municipality, in the administrative region of Saguenay–Lac-Saint-Jean, in the province of Quebec, in Canada.

The upper part of the Ouananiche river valley is served by chemin du 4e rang and chemin du 3e rang; the lower part via route Harry-Gagnon and boulevard de l'Anse (route 169).

Forestry is the main economic activity in most of this valley; nevertheless, agriculture is practiced in the lower part.

The surface of the Ouananiche River is usually frozen from the beginning of December to the end of March, except the rapids areas; however, traffic on the ice is generally safe from mid-December to mid-March.

== Geography ==
The Ouananiche River originates from Lac Brassard (length: 0.375 km (0.233 mi); altitude: 291 m (955 ft)). This lake takes the form of a birch leaf. The mouth of Lac Brassard is located southeast of the lake, either:

- 9.3 km (5.8 mi) west of the course of the Ouiatchouan River;
- 9.4 km (5.8 mi) west of the village center of Val-Jalbert;
- 7.5 km (4.7 mi) south-west of the mouth of the Ouananiche river.

From the mouth of Lac Brassard, the Ouananiche river flows over 10.8 km (6.7 mi) with a drop of 200 m (660 ft), according to the following segments:

- 3.6 km (2.2 mi) first towards the south-east to the outlet (coming from the south) of Lac du Quatre; northeasterly, crossing two small lakes and passing north of a mountain, to a bend in the river; then south-east by collecting the outlet (coming from the southwest) from two unidentified lakes, up to the outlet (coming from the southeast) from Lac des Soeurs;
- 3.2 km (2.0 mi) north-east, up to a bend in the river;
- 4.0 km (2.5 mi) to the east, then to the northeast, winding heavily in an agricultural area, cutting the route 169, and cutting the road to iron at the end of the segment, to its mouth.

The Ouananiche river flows at the bottom of a small narrow bay (length: 0.18 km (0.11 mi), on the southwest shore of lac Saint-Jean. This confluence is located at 3.5 km (2.2 mi) west of the entrance to Anse de Chambord which is delimited between Pointe de Chambord (to the north) and Pointe aux Pins (to the south) The confluence of the Ouaniche river is located at:

- 33.6 km (20.9 mi) south-west of the mouth of Lac Saint-Jean;
- 10.1 km (6.3 mi) west of the village center of Chambord;
- 6.0 km (3.7 mi) southeast of downtown Roberval.

From the mouth of the Ouananiche river, the current crosses Lac Saint-Jean to the east for 33.6 km (20.9 mi) to the northeast, follows the course of the Saguenay River (via the Little Landfill) on 172.3 km (107.1 mi) eastwards to Tadoussac where it merges with the Estuary of Saint Lawrence.

== Toponymy ==
The term Ouananiche (English: landlocked salmon) refers to a species of freshwater salmon from the northeast lakes of United States, Ontario, Canada Atlantic and Quebec.

The toponym "Ouananiche river" was formalized on December 5, 1968, at the Bank of Place Names of the Commission de toponymie du Québec.

== See also ==
- Saguenay River, a stream
