= Ouiatchouan River =

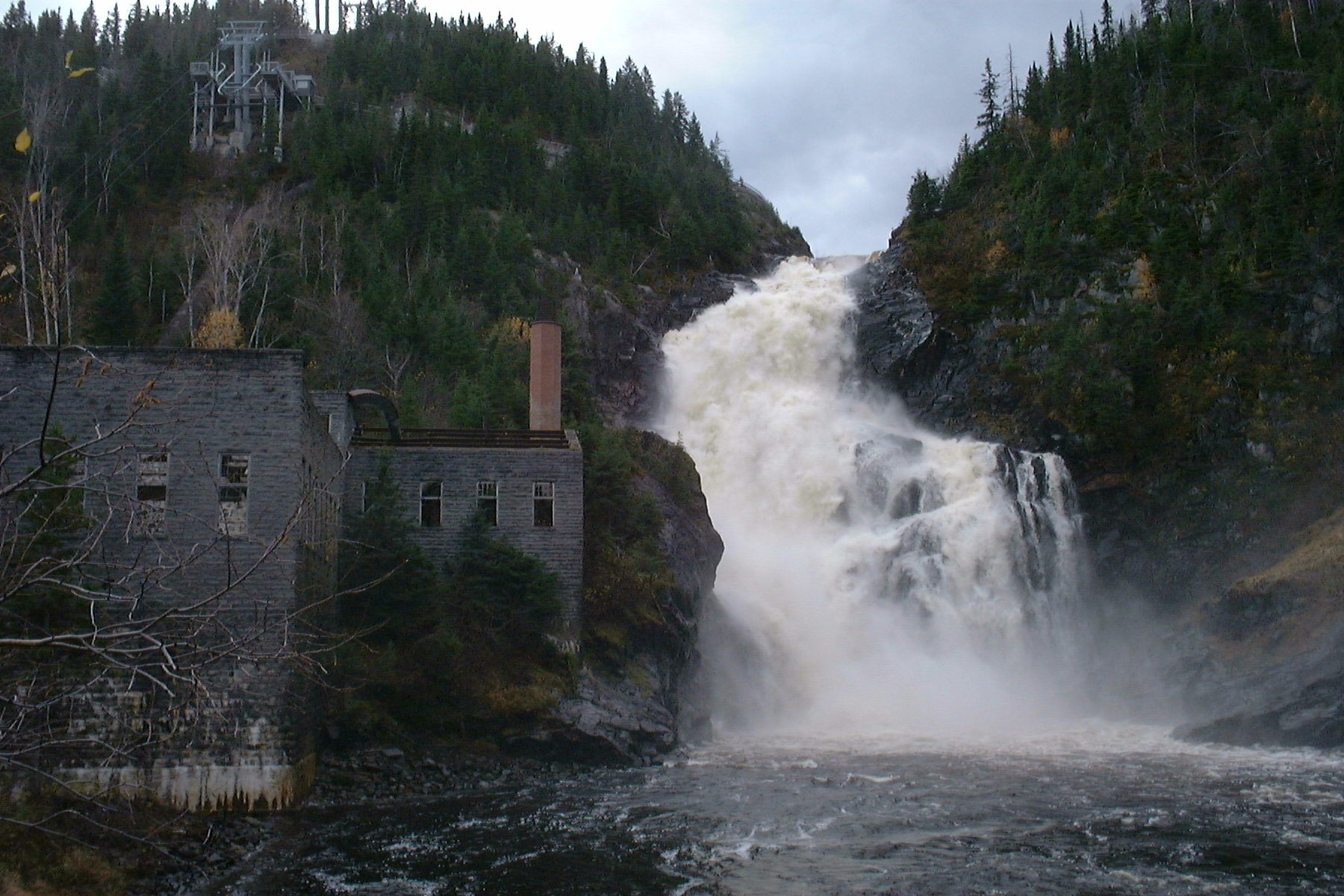

Location
- Country: Canada
- Province: Quebec
- Region: Saguenay–Lac-Saint-Jean
- MRC: Le Domaine-du-Roy Regional County Municipality

Physical characteristics
- Source: Lac des Commissaires
  - location: Lac-Bouchette
  - coordinates: 48°12′12″N 72°14′32″W
  - elevation: 331 m (1,086 ft)
- Mouth: Lac Saint-Jean
  - location: Chambord
  - coordinates: 48°26′53″N 72°09′33″W
  - elevation: 101 m (331 ft)
- Length: 35 km (22 mi)

Basin features
- Progression: Lac Saint-Jean, Saguenay River
- Tributaries
  - left: (upstream) Ouellet River, 3 lakes outlet, 5 lakes outlet, Petite rivière Ballantyne, Sergerie River, Noire River.
  - right: (upstream) ruisseau non-identifié, Petite rivière de la Savane, décharge du Lac des Bouleaux, Le Faux Canal.

La rivière Ouiatchouan (formerly Ouiatchouane) is a tributary of lac Saint-Jean, flowing in the municipalities of Lac-Bouchette and Chambord, in the Le Domaine-du-Roy Regional County Municipality, in the administrative region of Saguenay–Lac-Saint-Jean, from province of Quebec, to Canada.

Apart from the lower zone, forestry is the main economic activity in this valley.

The surface of the Ouiatchouan River is usually frozen from the beginning of December to the end of March, except the rapids areas; however, safe circulation on the ice is generally from mid-December to mid-March.

== Geography ==
Flowing towards North, this river of about 25 km (16 mi) has its source in the Ouiatchouan Lake, the Bouchette Lake and Lac des Commissaires. The Ouiatchouan River receives its water directly from the Lac des Commissaires, which flows into the Bouchette Lake. This last lake flows through a small channel in Ouiatchouan Lake.

The mouth of Ouiatchouan Lake flows north-west to the bottom of a bay (0.7 km (0.43 mi) deep) in the Ouiatchouan River, in range VI, of Canton Dublon, from Lac-Bouchette; then this river crosses range IV flowing north. Then, the river crosses ranges III, II and I of the Canton of Dablon of the municipality of Saint-François-de-Sales; in range I, it receives water from Martin stream on the west side.

The river continues its course to the north in the Canton of Charlevoix where it receives on the east side the waters of the Petite Rivière de la Savane. The latter flows in ranges II and I of the Dablon township; its mouth crosses the Ouiatchane river in range VII of the township of Charlevoix. A little further, the Ouiatchane river receives on the west side the waters of the Little Ballantyne river at range VI, where the river branches off to the East. The waters then cross several rapids of row VI: rapids of the islet, rapids Ballantyne and rapids of the Devil. In Chambord, the river crosses ranges V, IV, III, II and I; the waters then cross several obstacles: pine rapid (range IV), Grands Rapides (range II) and the Ouiatchouan waterfall (range II at Val Jalbert). At the end of its course, the river generates majestic falls in the heritage village of Val Jalbert, then the waters flow into a cove south of lac Saint-Jean.

The Ouiatchouan River flows for 28 km (17 mi) north to reach Lac Saint-Jean, 6.5 km (4.0 mi) northwest of the intersection of route 155 and route 169. The Ouiatchouan river flows mainly in wooded areas, except the last two kilometers of its route which are agricultural in nature.

== Harnessing project ==
In the early 2010s, the Ouiatchouan River was the subject of a harnessing project). This hydroelectric development project is provoking a debate between promoters of the work and supporters of the "protection" of the river.

== Toponymy ==
The toponym "rivière Ouiatchouan" was formalized on December 5, 1968, at the Bank of Place Names of the Commission de toponymie du Québec, that is to say at the creation of this commission.

== See also ==
- Val-Jalbert
- List of rivers of Quebec
