= Lac des Commissaires =

Lake in Quebec, Canada

- Location in Quebec
- Location: Lac-Ashuapmushuan, Le Domaine-du-Roy Regional County Municipality, Saguenay–Lac-Saint-Jean
- Coordinates: 48.18722°N 72.26417°W
- Lake type: Natural
- Primary inflows: (clockwise from the mouth) Décharge du lac Léandre et du lac des Deux Îles, ruisseau non identifié, ruisseau non identifié, rivière des Commissaires, décharge du Petit lac Caché, décharge du lac Caché, décharge d'un lac non identifié, décharge du lac de l'Épinette Rouge, décharge des lacs Gabriel et Malfait, décharge du lac Raquette, décharge du lac Cageux, ruisseau Jourdain, décharge du Grand lac Thaddé, décharge des lacs Isabeau et Gilbert, décharge du lac Miville, décharge du lac Pot, Goddard River, Goéland River (lac des Commissaires), décharge du lac à Roger.
- Primary outflows: Ouiatchouane River
- Basin countries: Canada
- Max. length: 29 km (18 mi)
- Max. width: 4 km (2.5 mi)
- Surface area: 29 km^{2} (11 sq mi)
- Average depth: 46 m (151 ft)
- Max. depth: 46 m (151 ft)
- Surface elevation: 331 m (1,086 ft)

The lac des Commissaires flows in the municipality of Lac-Bouchette, in the MRC Le Domaine-du-Roy Regional County Municipality, in the administrative region Saguenay–Lac-Saint-Jean, in Quebec, in Canada. The lake is popular for recreational and tourist activities.

The surface of "Lac des Commissaires" is usually frozen from the beginning of December to the end of March, however the safe circulation on the ice is generally made from the end of December to mid-March.

== Geography ==
The "Lac des Commissaires" is located 26 kilometres (16 mi) south of Roberval, 22 kilometres (14 mi) south of Lac Saint-Jean and 84 km (52 mi) northeast of La Tuque. Covering an area of 29 square kilometres (11 sq mi) and a length of 29 kilometres (18 mi), the lake stretches from north to south. Its maximum width is 2 kilometres (1.2 mi). Its shape has two parts, roughly of similar length. The southern end of the southern part of the lake ends in a narrow bay six kilometers long, curving west. The route 155 connecting La Tuque and Chambord runs along the southern part of the lake.

In the middle of the lake, in the northern part, the lake forms a bulge towards the East, designated "Hail Bay" or "Mirage Lake" (former name "Lac Quaquakamaksis"). The "Commissioners Dam" belongs to the Government of Quebec and is found at the outlet of Lac des Commissaires, which is the main source supplying the Ouiatchouan River. The emissary of the Commissioners lake is the "Commissioners river".

The rivière des Commissaires flows at the limit of ranges 6 and 7, 3 kilometres (1.9 mi) northeast to reach the south of Bouchette Lake; the current flows opposite Île Bouchette (triangular island located near the west shore of the lake). The Bouchette Lake is 4.2 kilometres (2.6 mi) long in the north–south direction and a maximum width of 1.4 kilometres (0.87 mi). The village of Lac-Bouchette is located on its eastern shore of lakes Bouchette and Ouiatchouane. The mouth of Bouchette Lake is located in its northern part and flows into the southern part of Lake Ouiatchouane. The latter flows from the north into the Ouiatchouan River which flows 28 kilometres (17 mi) north to reach Lac Saint-Jean, 6.5 kilometres (4.0 mi) northwest of the intersection of route 155 and route 169. The Ouiatchouan River flows mainly in wooded areas, except the last two kilometers of its route which are agricultural in nature.

Dam of Lac des Commissaires

Built in 1971, the Lac des Commissaires dam has a height of 8.2 metres (27 ft) and a retention height of 6.6 metres (22 ft). The dam has a holding capacity of 186,960,000 m^{3} (6.602×10^{9} cu ft). This "Concrete-gravity" type dam on a rock foundation has a length of 198.7 m. The area of the reservoir retained by the dam is 2,849 hectares (7,040 acres) and the area of the catchment area is 562 km^{2} (217 sq mi). This dam is operated by the "Center d 'expertise hydrique du Québec".

== Toponymy ==
In 1828, the land surveyor, Joseph Bouchette, assigned the toponym "Lac des Commissaires", in honor of Commissioners Andrew and David Stuart, responsible for an expedition to explore the Saguenay territory. In his Journal of 1732, the surveyor Joseph-Laurent Normandin designates this lake Eskaskouakama, that is to say a word of the Montagnais language which he translates as follows: wood". This surveyor adds: "Indeed this Lake of Costé du Nord is bordered by a fairly high and well wooded land and Costé du Sud is a low land without any wood". In 1890, the land surveyor Elzéar Laberge, in his report on the township of Crespieul, used the toponym "Lac des Commissaires" to identify this body of water.

The toponym "Lac des Commissaires" was registered on December 5, 1968, in the Place Names Bank of the Commission de toponymie du Québec.

== See also ==
- List of lakes of Canada
