= Winnipeg Limited =

Former overnight passenger train between St. Paul and Winnipeg

The Winnipeg Limited
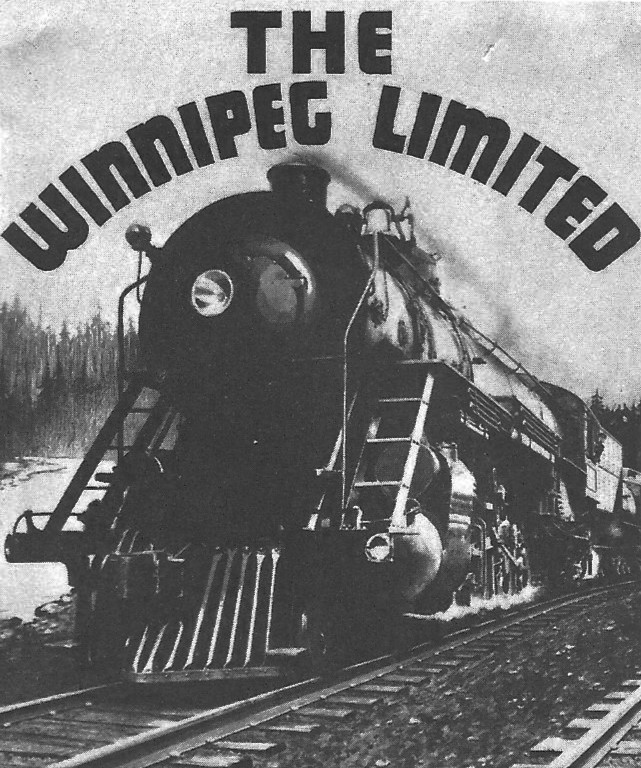
- The train in 1939

Overview
- Service type: Overnight passenger service
- Last service: April 30, 1971
- Current operator(s): Great Northern Railway

Route
- Termini: St. Paul, Minnesota, United States; Winnipeg, Manitoba, Canada
- Stops: 28
- Distance travelled: 735 kilometres (457 mi)
- Average journey time: 12 hours 20 minutes
- Train number(s): 9, 10 (1886-1913) 7, 8 (1913-1970) 47, 48 (1970-1971)

The Winnipeg Limited was an overnight named passenger train operated by the Great Northern Railway 457 miles (735 km) between St. Paul-Minneapolis and Winnipeg. It competed on the route with the overnight Winnipeger of the Minneapolis, St. Paul and Sault Ste. Marie Railway ("Soo Line"), and the Northern Pacific Railway's unnamed daytime passenger train.

== History ==
The train was among the first operated by the St Paul, Minneapolis and Manitoba as train numbers 9 and 10, changing to 7 and 8 by 1913. It originally ran via Willmar to Fargo and Crookston, but was later moved to the main line that ran via St. Cloud. The service was truncated to run between Manitoba and Grand Forks after February 2, 1970. Burlington Northern continued to operate the train as numbers 47 and 48, although they did not retain the name, with it informally being known as the "Winnipeg Connection". It was not retained by Amtrak, and made its last run April 30, 1971.

== Rolling stock ==
The Great Northern Railway's Winnipeg Limited was a train that evolved into a streamliner rather than becoming streamlined all at once. The Winnipeg Limited carried neither an observation car nor a dome car, but it did have a club car. A typical consist of the period used streamlined head-end cars, 48-revenue-seat leg-rest coaches handed down from the Western Star, a Pass-series 6-roomette, 5-double bedroom, 2-compartment sleeping car, a Glacier-series 16-duplex roomette, 4-double bedroom sleeping car both handed down from the Western Star. A Canadian National Railway Green-series 6-section, 6-roomette, 4-double-bedroom sleeping car was carried between St. Paul and Winnipeg nightly in the summer season that continued on to Vancouver, British Columbia, in the Super Continental west of Winnipeg. The only two cars exclusive to the Winnipeg Limited were the two Club-series cars rebuilt by Pullman in February 1956 from Glacier-series sleeping cars. These two Club-series cars retained their 8 duplex roomettes at one end and two of the double bedrooms. The space formerly occupied by the other two bedrooms was replaced by a buffet, and where the remaining eight duplex roomettes had been became a 12-seat dinette and 12-seat lounge area. These two cars were numbered and named 1198 Manitoba Club and 1099 Winnipeg Club and were operated one per consist. With the addition of these cars to the Winnipeg Limited on March 1, 1956, the trains were streamlined with the following consists:

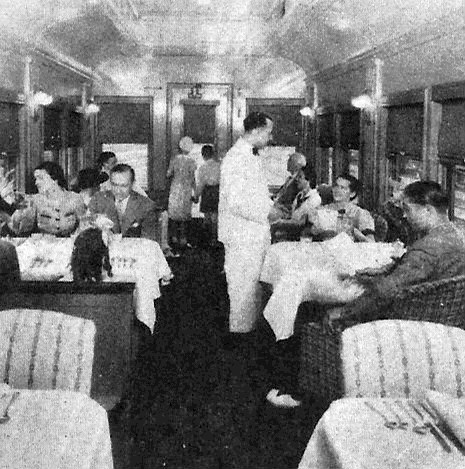
The dining-club-observation car in 1939.

=== First consist ===
- 504 EMD E7A 2,000 hp (1.5 MW) diesel passenger cab unit
- 505 EMD E7A 2,000 hp diesel passenger cab unit
- 1102 baggage 30-foot (9.1 m) railway post office car
- 246 baggage express car
- 1131 48-revenue-seat leg-rest coach
- 1127 48-revenue-seat leg-rest coach
- 1133 48-revenue-seat leg-rest coach
- 1198 Manitoba Club 8-duplex roomette 2-double bedroom buffet 12-seat dinette 12-seat lounge car
- 1376 Hart Pass 6-roomette 5-double bedroom 2-compartment sleeping car
- 1183 Hudson Glacier 16-duplex roomette 4-double bedroom sleeping car

=== Second consist ===
- 507 EMD E7A 2,000 hp (1.5 MW) diesel passenger cab unit
- 502 EMD E7A 2,000 hp diesel passenger cab unit
- 1103 baggage 30-foot railway post office car
- 249 baggage express car
- 1129 48-revenue-seat leg-rest coach
- 1121 48-revenue-seat leg-rest coach
- 1126 48-revenue-seat leg-rest coach
- 1199 Winnipeg Club 8-duplex roomette 2-double bedroom buffet 12-seat dinette 12-seat lounge car
- 1383 Inuya Pass 6-roomette 5-double bedroom 2-compartment sleeping car
- 1184 Chaney Glacier 16-duplex roomette 4-double bedroom sleeping car

== See also ==
- List of named passenger trains of Canada
