= Campbellton–Moncton train =

Canadian passenger train service

Overview
- Service type: Inter-city rail
- Status: Discontinued
- Locale: New Brunswick, Canada
- Predecessor: Scotian
- First service: October 28, 1979
- Last service: January 14, 1990
- Current operator(s): Via Rail

Route
- Termini: Campbellton; Moncton
- Stops: 8
- Distance travelled: 300 km (190 mi)
- Average journey time: 4 hours
- Service frequency: Daily
- Train number(s): 617, 618

Technical
- Track gauge: 1,435 mm (4 ft 8 1/2 in)
- Track owner(s): Canadian National Railway

The Campbellton–Moncton train was a daily Canadian passenger train service operated by Via Rail between Campbellton and Moncton, New Brunswick. Intermediate stops were in Charlo, Jacquet River, Petit-Rocher, Bathurst, Newcastle, and Nouvelle-Arcadie.

The service was established in 1979 to supplement the Ocean following the cancellation of the Scotian. It was discontinued in 1990.

== History ==
The Canadian National Railway historically operated two daily trains between Montreal and Halifax via Mont-Joli, Campbellton, and Moncton: the Ocean and the Scotian.

On October 28, 1979, the Scotian was discontinued in favor of extending the Atlantic, a former Canadian Pacific train, from Saint John to Halifax. To ensure twice-daily train service remained between Campbellton and Moncton, an unnamed round-trip bearing train numbers 617 and 618 was added on that corridor. Similarly in Quebec, the Saint-Laurent was added between Montreal and Mont-Joli.

Service was discontinued on January 15, 1990, during a round of severe cuts to the Via Rail network overseen by Benoît Bouchard due to the 1989 budget. Since then, the long-distance Ocean has remained the only passenger train operating between Campbellton and Moncton.
