= Chambord meteorite =

Meteorite found in Quebec, Canada

Chambord
- Type: Iron
- Structural classification: Medium octahedrite
- Group: IIIAB
- Country: Canada
- Region: Quebec, Canada
- Coordinates: 48°25′00″N 72°02′00″W
- Observed fall: no
- Found date: 1904
- TKW: 6.6 kilograms (15 lb)

Chambord is an iron meteorite found in Quebec.

== History ==
It was found in 1904 by a farmer about 3 kilometres (1.9 mi) from the village of Chambord, Quebec. The exact location and the name of the farmer are unknown. When the meteorite was found, it was brought to the attention of the superintendent of Mines for the Province of Quebec who then loaned it to the Geological Survey of Canada for analysis.

== Classification ==
It is a medium octahedrite, IIIAB.

== Fragments ==
The recovered fragment is an irregularly shaped block about 19 centimetres (7.5 in) x 9 centimetres (3.5 in) x 15 centimetres (5.9 in). The entire mass is in the Canadian Meteorite Collection, Geological Survey of Canada, Ottawa.

== See also ==
- Glossary of meteoritics
- Meteorite
