= Val-Jalbert =

Ghost town in the province of Québec, Canada

Coordinates: 48°26′40.7″N 72°9′51.7″W

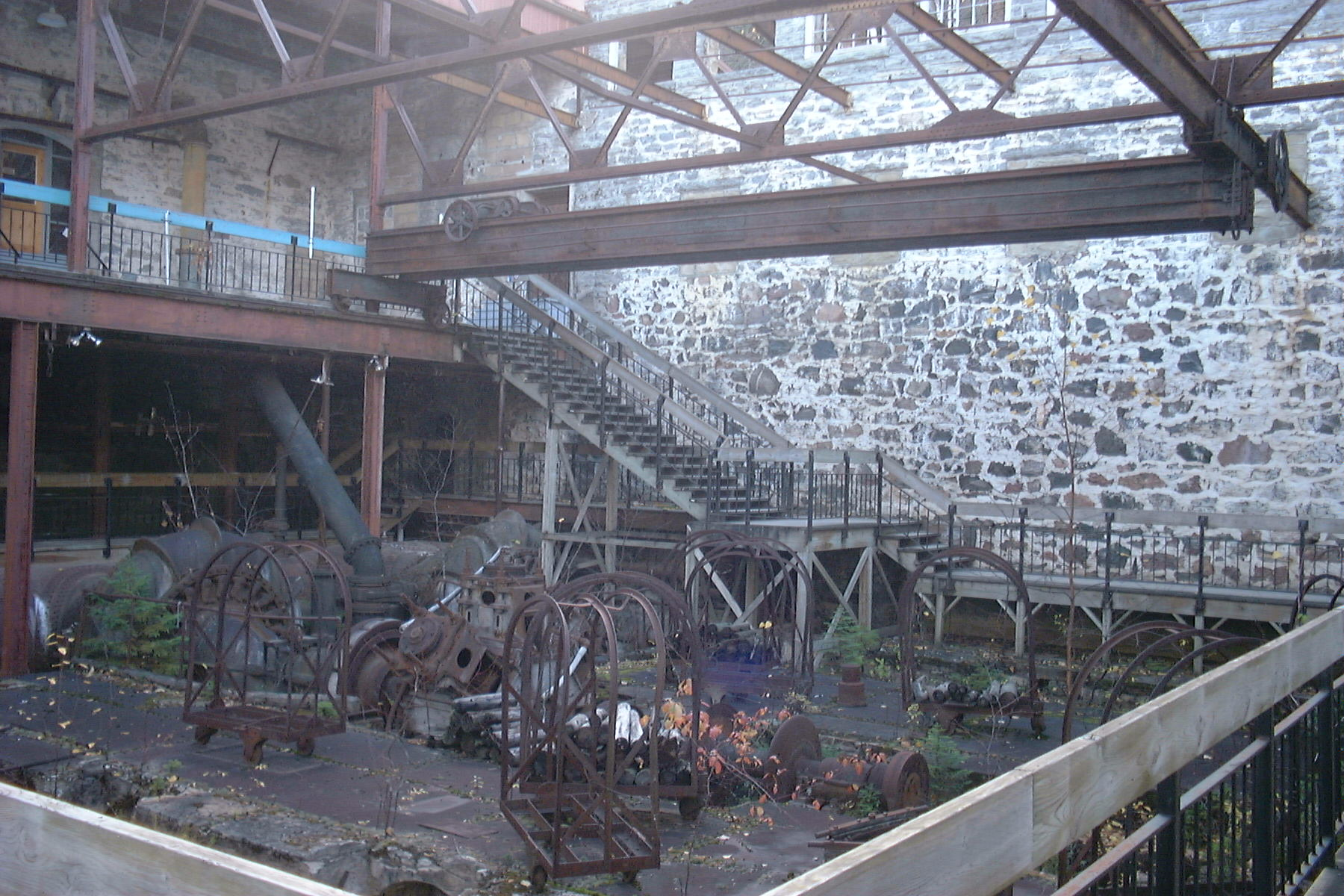
Abandoned papermill, Val Jalbert, 2000.

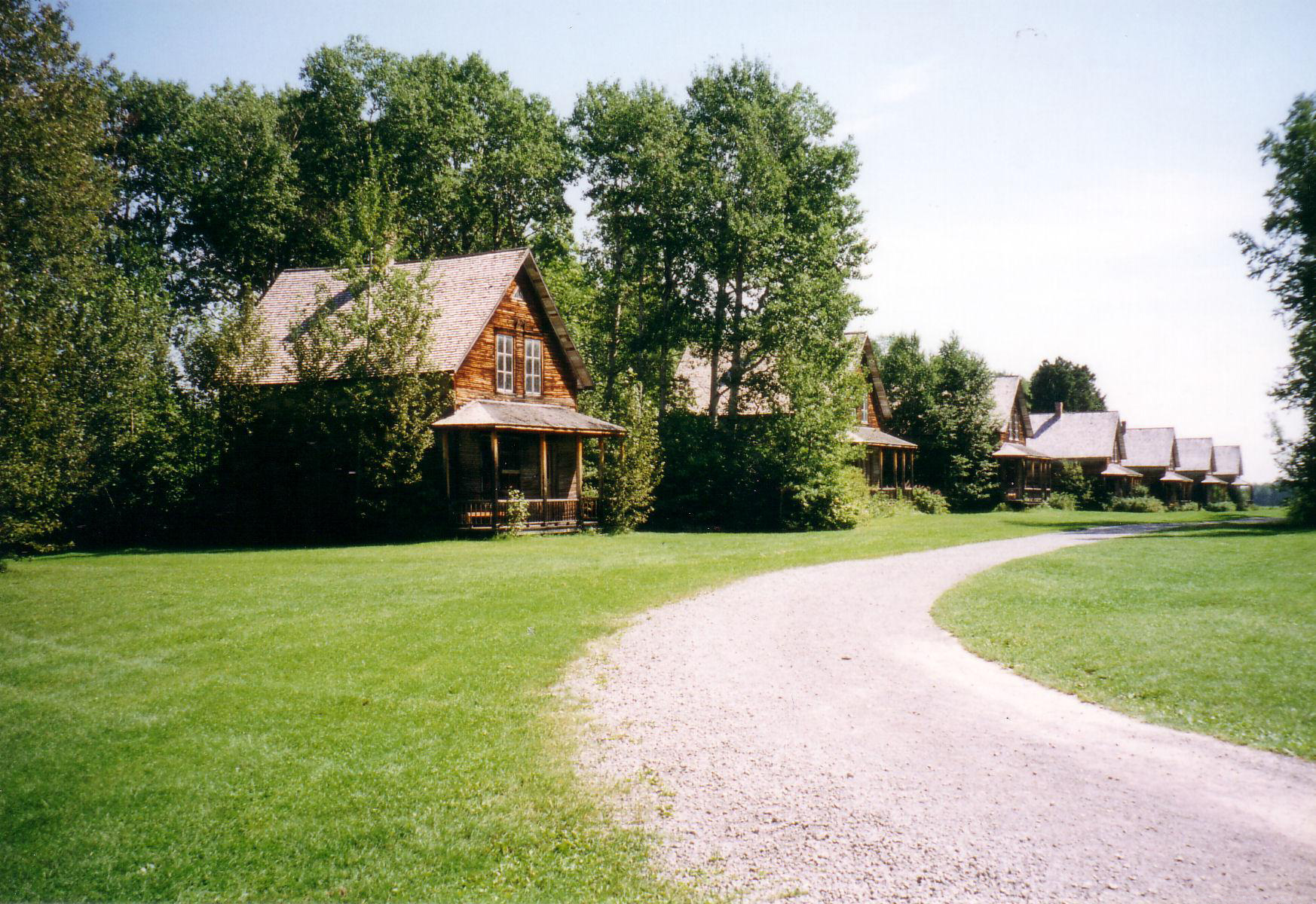
Houses in Val Jalbert, 2006

Val-Jalbert (French pronunciation: [val ʒalbɛʁ]) is a ghost town in the Saguenay-Lac-Saint-Jean region of Quebec, Canada. It is located 8 km (5 mi) northwest of the town of Chambord.

The village was founded in 1901 and soon saw success in the pulp mill created by Damase Jalbert at the base of the Ouiatchouan Falls. However, the success was fleeting as the abrupt closure of the mill in 1927 led the desertion of the entire village.

It became a park in 1960. With over 70 original abandoned buildings, Val-Jalbert has been described as the best-preserved ghost town in Canada.

== Toponymy ==
The village was founded by Damase Jalbert (1842–1904) which in 1901 also created the Ouiatchouan Pulp Company; that same year the village was first named Saint-Georges-de-Ouiatchouan, after the river that runs through it. It was later renamed Val-Jalbert in 1913 by the Chicoutimi Pulp Company in honour of its founder.

== History ==
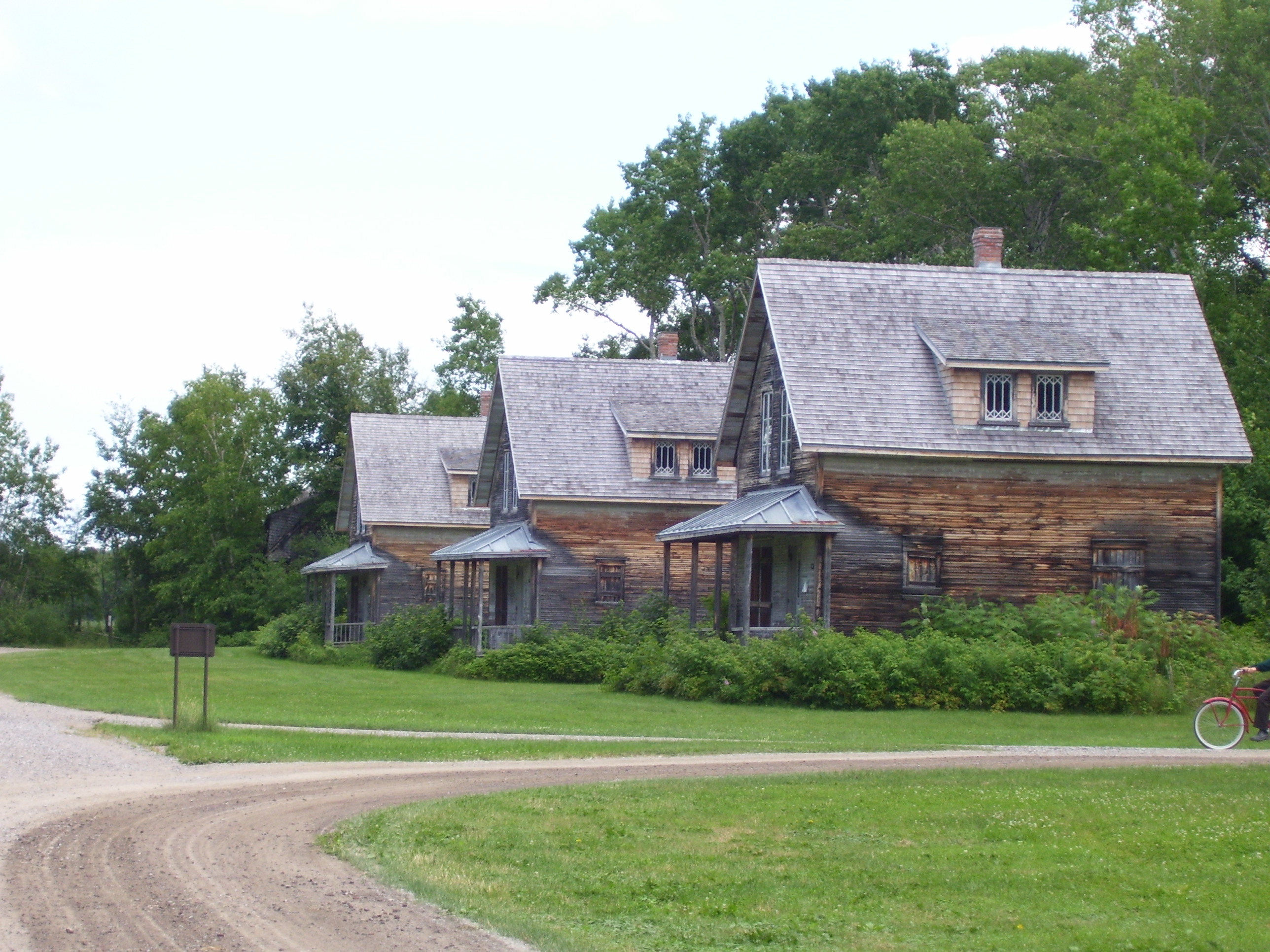
Workers dwellings at Val-Jalbert.

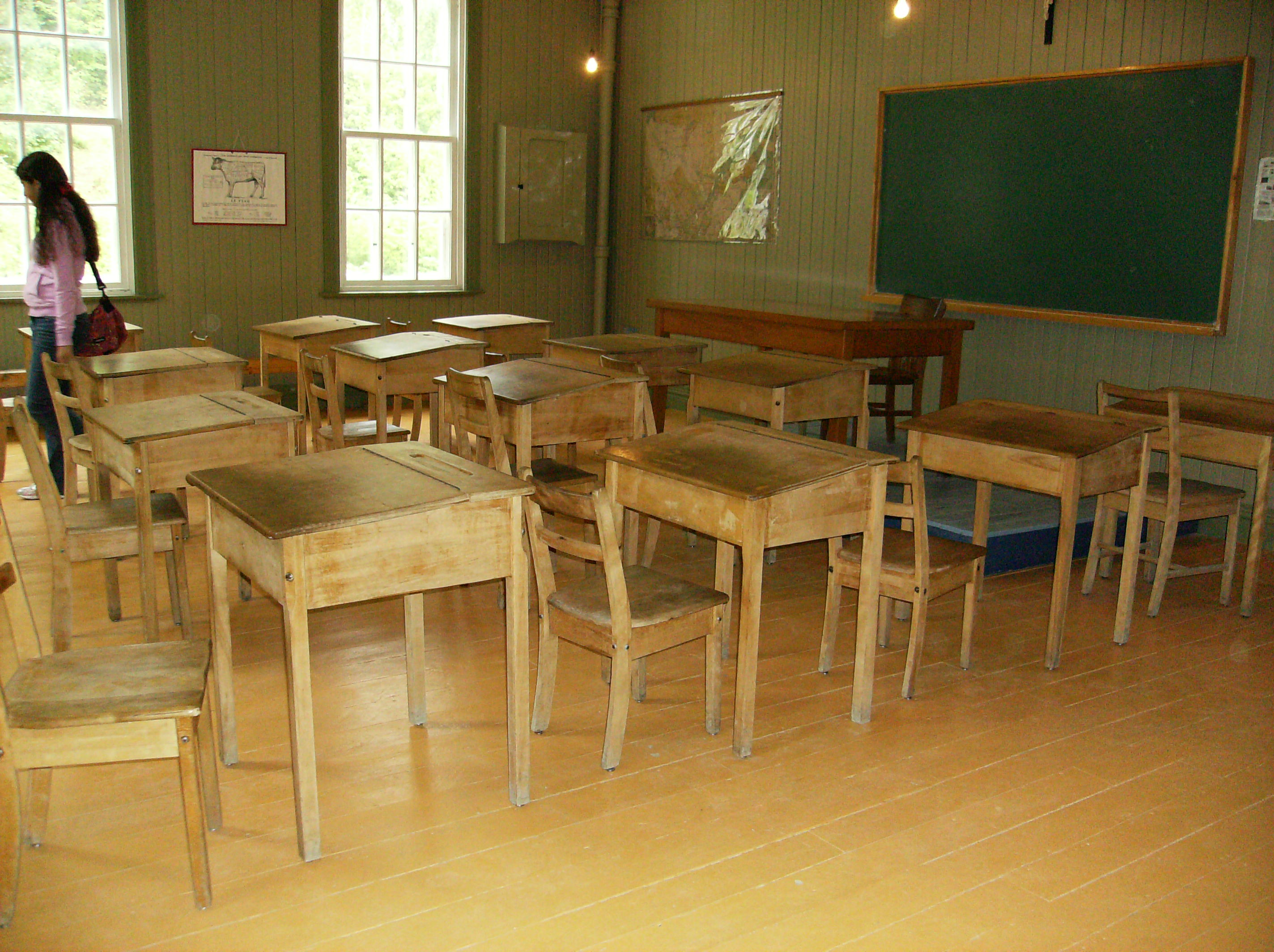
Inside the schoolhouse.

=== Company town ===
Located between the borders of the municipalities of Chambord and Roberval, Val-Jalbert was founded in 1901 when Damase Jalbert from Lac-Bouchette built a pulp and paper mill to meet growing demand for newsprint in Britain and America. The location was ideal since the energy required to operate the machinery could be produced by two waterfalls on the Ouiatchouan river, respectively 72 and 35 metres (236 and 115 ft) in height.

Following Jalbert's death in April 1904, the company was bought by American investors. The Ouiatchouan Falls Paper Company laid out the foundations of urban planning in the new community, with four types of dwellings for workers. The planned community separated workers housing located uptown, from the core business functions, located downhill. The company also built state of the art infrastructure in the remote community, including electricity, sewer, water works and telephone service.

The company was sold in 1909 to Julien-Édouard-Alfred Dubuc's Chicoutimi Pulp Company, who continued the planned development of the community.

Almost ten years later, the Spanish flu wreaked havoc among its small population.

=== Ghost town ===
In 1927, the Quebec Pulp and Paper Mills Ltd., which owned the plant for only a year, ceased all activities due to the lower demand for non-transformed mechanical pulp. Hoping for a reversal of the market, many unemployed workers remained in town until 1929, when the company ordered all homes boarded up. The local priest, Joseph-Edmond Tremblay, and the nuns from Chicoutimi who came to Val-Jalbert in 1915 to teach in the local school, definitively left the community on September 15, 1929.

The company went bankrupt in 1949 and the Quebec government gained title on the land, buildings and the hydraulic forces of the former village.

=== Tourist attraction ===
The site is first developed opened to the public in the 1960s by the tourism office and was transferred to the parks agency SEPAQ with a view to develop the full potential of the village in 1987.

In 1996, the Quebec Ministry of Culture and Communications designated the village as a heritage site and classify it as such. The site now falls under the municipality of Chambord.

In the 2000s, the site controlled was transferred to the Domaine-du-Roy regional county municipality. The new administration applied and was granted a $17 million subsidy by the Quebec and federal governments in 2009 to overhaul the facilities in order to increase the annual patronage.

== The hydroelectric dam project on the Ouiatchouan river ==
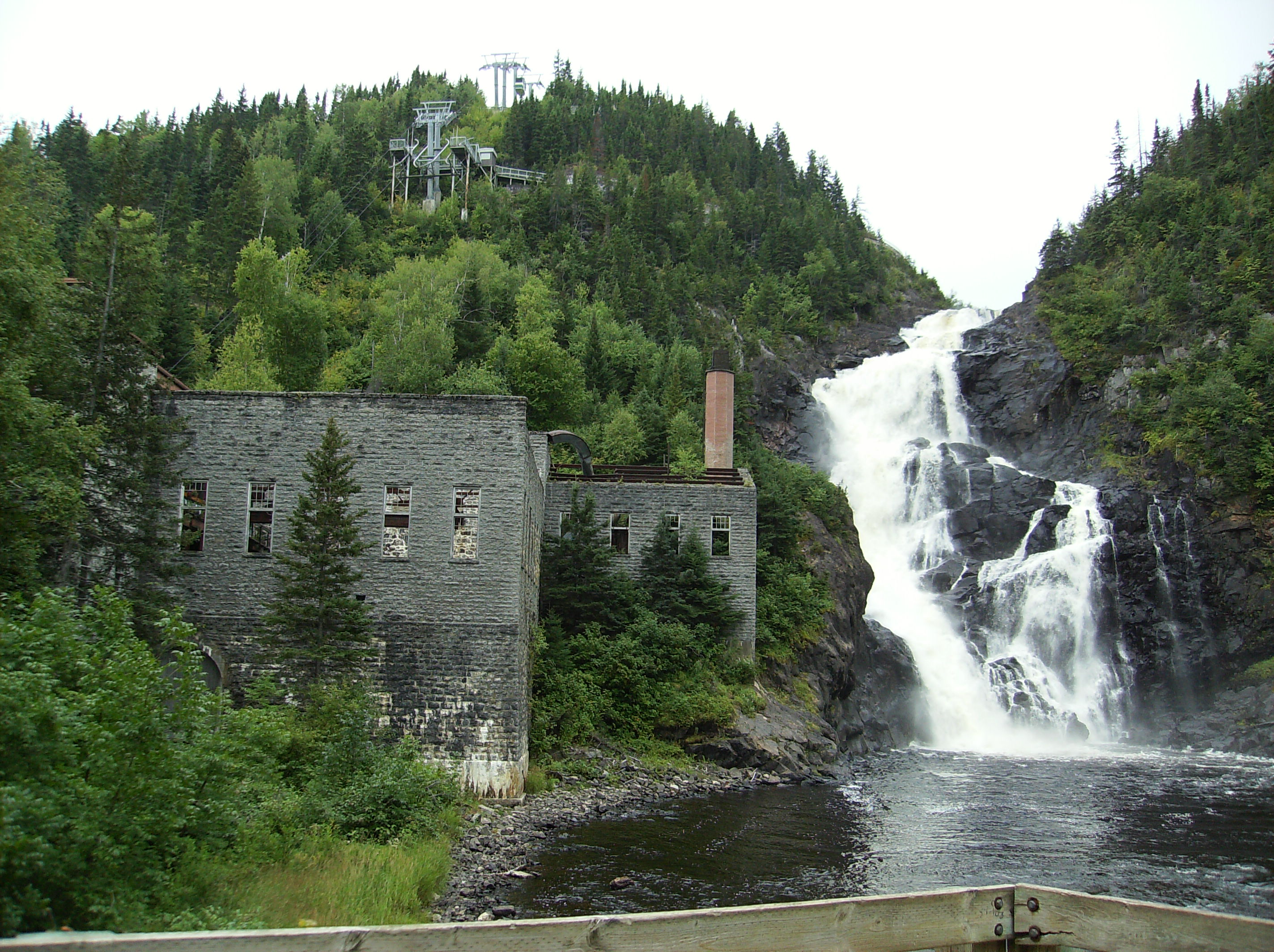
Ouiatchouan Falls, 2007

In October 2009, the "Energy Community Society of Lac St-Jean" announced plans to build an 18.3 megawatt hydroelectric plant near the historic mill, and build a dam upstream of the Ouiatchouan falls. The "Bureau of Environmental Public Hearings" (BAPE) heard concerns of the citizens of Roberval and surrounding areas during the months of March and April 2012. 75% of the interventions submitted were against the dam project. On July 13, 2012, the BAPE gave a favourable report to the developer.

The historical village of Val-Jalbert is the second most visited tourist attraction in the Lac St-Jean region after the zoo of St-Félicien. The majority of tourists go to Val-Jalbert to see its waterfall. The developer intended to provide an aesthetic flow of 7 m^{3} (250 cu ft) per second during daytime operational hours, which is half the average rate at which summer tourists are accustomed to. At night and during the six winter months, the developer offered to ensure a mere ecological flow of 0.3 m^{3} (11 cu ft) per second, which is equivalent to a standard domestic hot water tank.

In September 2012, the Coalition to Safeguard Ouiatchouan Val-Jalbert (CSOV) and the Fondation Rivières challenged the merits of the project, and attempted to preserve the Ouiatchouan River and its falls. On December 5, 2012, the Quebec Council of Ministers adopted the decree authorizing the construction of the hydroelectric station and dam at Val-Jalbert. In early 2013 a survey conducted by an independent firm found that 53% of the population of Lac St-Jean opposed the dam project. On February 5, 2013, Martine Ouellet, Minister of Natural Resources terminated the controversial small hydroelectric dams program with the exception of the Val-Jalbert project, which prompted much dismay among the opposition. Two days later on February 7, 2013, the Quebec Ministry of Sustainable Development, Environment, Wildlife and Parks issued the certificate of authorization which allowed the developer to perform preliminary work.

On February 11, 2013, the start of construction of the power station began with machinery and workers arriving on site. A survey performed by Léger Marketing on February 15/16, 2013 found that 51% of survey respondents opposed the project and 40% supported it. Additionally, 61% of respondents wanted to terminate or suspend construction.

On February 16, the Innu of the Masteuiatsh community were never consulted by referendum and filed a petition signed by nearly a quarter of the population of Masteuiatsh forcing the present Band Council (itself a 45% shareholder in the project) into early elections on May 27, 2013. On April 8, 2013, five members of the Front for the Liberation of Ouiatchouan barricaded themselves inside two sky cabins which serve as a lift for tourists to access the top of the falls. All were arrested by the police the same day.

== Bibliography ==
- Bureau d'audiences publiques sur l'environnement (June 28, 2012). Projet de mise en valeur hydroélectrique de la rivière Ouiatchouan au village historique de Val-Jalbert: Rapport d'enquête et d'audiences publiques (N° 289) (PDF) (in French). Quebec City: BAPE. ISBN 978-2-550-65126-0. Archived from the original (PDF) on March 4, 2016.
- Quebec (1997). Commission d'enquête sur la politique d'achat par Hydro-Québec d'électricité auprès de producteurs privés (Commission Doyon): Rapport final (in French). Quebec City: Quebec [Department of the Executive Council]. ISBN 2-551-17686-7.
- Bureau d'audiences publiques sur l'environnement (August 30, 1994). Projet d'aménagement hydroélectrique de Val-Jalbert: Rapport d'enquête et d'audiences publiques (N° 82) (PDF) (in French). Quebec City: BAPE. ISBN 2-550-29799-7. Archived from the original (PDF) on March 4, 2016.
