= Moncton–Edmundston train =

Passenger train service operated by Via Rail

Overview
- Service type: Inter-city rail
- Status: Discontinued
- Locale: New Brunswick, Canada
- Last service: January 14, 1990
- Current operator(s): Via Rail
- Former operator(s): Canadian National Railway

Route
- Termini: Moncton; Edmundston
- Stops: 9
- Distance travelled: 372 km (231 mi)
- Average journey time: 4 hr 30 min
- Service frequency: 3 round trips per week
- Train number(s): 619, 620, 625, 626, 628

Technical
- Track gauge: 1,435 mm (4 ft 8 1/2 in)
- Track owner(s): Canadian National Railway

The Moncton–Edmundston train was a passenger train service operated by Via Rail between Moncton and Edmundston, New Brunswick. Intermediate stops were in Chipman, McGivney, Napadogan, Juniper, Tobique Valley, Grand Falls, and Saint-Léonard.

Discontinued in 1990, this was the last passenger train route to serve Edmundston. Moncton is still served by the Ocean.

== History ==
The Moncton–Edmundston train was operated by the Canadian National Railway until 1977, when CN's passenger rail services were spun off into Via Rail. Service consisted of one daily round trip.

The route disappeared from the timetable on November 15, 1981.

On October 28, 1984, the service resumed on a reduced schedule. Wednesdays and Fridays saw one round trip each. A third trip departed Moncton on Sundays and returned from Edmundston on Mondays.

Service was discontinued on January 15, 1990, during a round of severe cuts to the Via Rail network overseen by Benoît Bouchard due to the 1989 budget. This marked the end of passenger rail service to Edmundston.

== Proposed restoration ==
In 2014, Via Rail considered rerouting the Ocean between Edmundston and Moncton rather than pay CA$10 million to rebuild 70 km (43 mi) of track from Miramichi to Bathurst. The rerouting was estimated to cost CA$50 million and involve construction of five new stations.
