= Saint-Laurent (train) =

Overview
- Service type: Inter-city rail
- Status: Discontinued
- Locale: Quebec, Canada
- Predecessor: Scotian
- First service: October 28, 1979; June 1, 1985
- Last service: May 28, 1983; January 14, 1990
- Current operator(s): Via Rail

Route
- Termini: Mont-Joli; Montreal (1979–1983); Sainte-Foy (1985); Quebec City (1985–1990)
- Stops: 15 (1979); 12 (1989)
- Distance travelled: 578 km (359 mi) (1979); 357 km (222 mi) (1989)
- Service frequency: Daily
- Train number(s): 18, 19 (1979–1983); 631, 632 (1985–1990)

Technical
- Track gauge: 1,435 mm (4 ft 8 1/2 in)
- Track owner(s): Canadian National Railway

The Saint-Laurent (French: Le Saint–Laurent) was a daily passenger train service operated by Via Rail along the St. Lawrence River from Mont-Joli to Montreal and later Quebec City.

The train was first established in 1979 to supplement the Ocean in eastern Quebec following the cancellation of the Scotian. Service lasted until 1990, with a hiatus from 1983 to 1985.

== History ==
The Canadian National Railway historically operated two daily passenger trains between Montreal and Halifax via Mont-Joli, Campbellton, and Moncton: the Ocean and the Scotian.

On October 28, 1979, Via Rail discontinued the Scotian in favor of extending the Atlantic, a former Canadian Pacific train, from Saint John to Halifax. To ensure twice-daily train service remained between Mont-Joli and Montreal, the Saint-Laurent was added with train numbers 18 and 19. Similarly in New Brunswick, an unnamed Campbellton–Moncton train was added.

From May 1983 to June 1985 the Saint-Laurent was replaced with an extension of the Chaleur. Before and after this time, the Chaleur and the Ocean ran together as one train from Montreal that divided at Matapédia station.

On June 1, 1985, the Saint-Laurent returned with a southern terminus in Quebec City (briefly in Sainte-Foy), coinciding with the reopening of the Gare du Palais as the endpoint of the Quebec City–Windsor Corridor. Timed transfers connected Saint-Laurent passengers with Corridor trains serving Montreal and points south. This version of the Saint-Laurent carried train numbers 631 and 632.

Service was discontinued on January 15, 1990, during a round of severe cuts to the Via Rail network overseen by Benoît Bouchard due to the 1989 budget.
