= Bouchette Lake =

Lake in Lac-Bouchette, Quebec, Canada

- Location in Quebec
- Location: Lac-Bouchette, Le Domaine-du-Roy Regional County Municipality, Saguenay–Lac-Saint-Jean
- Coordinates: 48.24222°N 72.20583°W
- Lake type: Natural
- Primary inflows: (clockwise from the mouth) Ruisseau Thibault, Ouiatchouaniche River, discharge of lac à Pit.
- Primary outflows: Ouiatchouane Lake
- Basin countries: Canada
- Max. length: 4.4 km (2.7 mi)
- Max. width: 1.4 km (0.87 mi)
- Surface elevation: 311 m (1,020 ft)

The Lac Bouchette is a fresh water body located in the municipality of Lac-Bouchette, in the MRC Le Domaine-du-Roy Regional County Municipality, in the administrative region Saguenay–Lac-Saint-Jean, in Quebec, in Canada. The main vocation of the lake relates to recreational and tourist activities, in an agricultural environment.

The surface of Lac Bouchette is usually frozen from the beginning of December to the end of March, however the safe circulation on the ice is generally made from the end of December to mid-March.

== Geography ==
Lac Bouchette is located in the township of Dablon, covering a large area from range V to range VII. The lake is 4.2 kilometres (2.6 mi) long in the north–south direction and a maximum width of 1.4 kilometres (0.87 mi). Lac Bouchette receives by its southern point the waters of the rivière des Commissaires which flows for 3 kilometres (1.9 mi) towards the northeast at the limit of ranges V1 and V11, from lac des Commissaires. The plans of the Mapping Service of the Ministry of Energy and Resources, of the Government of Quebec, indicate this segment of river as the Ouiatchouane River. This river receives on its right the waters of the trout river.

With a length of 2.1 kilometres (1.3 mi) (in a north–south direction), Ouiatchouane Lake is located adjacent north of Bouchette Lake, in ranges V and V1. End to end, these two lakes form a body of water 6.3 kilometres (3.9 mi) long. An isthmus 0.5 km long which is crossed on the west side by a channel about 250 m long designated the "Pass", separates the lakes Bouchette and Ouiatchouane. The Hermitage road crosses this isthmus from East to West, to head towards the Ermitage Saint-Antoine. The waters of Lake Bouchette flow from the north into Lake Ouiatchouane, via this "Pass".

The route 155, connecting La Tuque and Chambord (Lac Saint-Jean), runs along the eastern part of the Bouchette lakes and Ouiatchouane. This road crosses the village of Lac-Bouchette, which is located on the eastern shore of these two lakes. A road goes around Lac Bouchette.

The main tributaries of the eastern shore of Lac Bouchette are: 7e rang stream, Bouchard-Cloutier stream and Ruisseau Thibault which feeds on Lac Castor. While the Qui-Mène-du-Train River flows on the eastern shore of Lake Ouiatchouane. Lac Trévis is located parallel to Lac Bouchette (distance of 1.1 km for the southern part of each lake), to the west, in range 7.

Lac Bouchette has wetlands on the west shore. This zone begins at Baie de la Grèle, located at the mouth of lac des Commissaires and extends in range V11 from lot 40 to lot 23. This wetland covers part of Bouchette Island (triangular), located on Lake Bouchette, near the mouth of the rivière des Commissaires.

Lac des Commissiaires

Covering an area of 29 km^{2} (11 sq mi) and a length of 29 km (18 mi), the lac des Commissioners stretches from north to south. Its maximum width is 2 km (1.2 mi). Its shape has two parts, roughly of similar length. The southern end of the southern part of the lake ends in a narrow bay six kilometers long, curving west. The route 155 connecting La Tuque and Chambord runs along the southern part of the lake. In the middle of the lake, in the northern part, the lake forms a bulge towards the East, designated "Hail Bay" or "Mirage Lake" (former name "Lac Quaquakamaksis"). The "dam of the Commissioners" belongs to the Government of Quebec and is found at the outlet of the Lac des Commissaires, which constitutes the main source supplying the Ouiatchouane River.

Ouiatchouane River

The mouth of Ouiatchouane Lake drains from the northwest to the bottom of a bay (0.7 kilometres (0.43 mi) deep) in the Ouiatchouane River. This river flows 28 km (17 mi) north to reach Lac Saint-Jean, 6.5 kilometres (4.0 mi) northwest of the intersection of route 155 and route 169. The Ouiatchouane River flows mainly in the woods, except the last two kilometers of its route which are agricultural in nature.

== Toponymy ==
The toponym "Lac Bouchette" was established in 1828, during an expedition to explore the territory. This expedition follows the vote on a plan by the Legislative Assembly of Lower Canada to establish new places of colonization. In 1828, the surveyor Joseph Bouchette (1774-1841) who led an expedition in the Lac-Saint-Jean region, was accompanied by commissioners Andrew and David Stuart. The Surveyor General's team had left Trois-Rivières in the summer of 1828, going up the Saint-Maurice River to La Tuque. Then, they borrowed the Bostonnais River to go up to the head lakes where it is possible to change the catchment area in particular by using the Métabetchouan river, to descend to Lac Saint-Jean. In Quebec, several place names include the surname "Bouchette" in his memory, including a canton located south of Maniwaki and the La Vérendrye Wildlife Reserve.

The toponym "Lac Bouchette" was registered on December 5, 1968, at the Place Names Bank of the Commission de toponymie du Québec.

== Appendices ==
=== Related articles ===
- Lac Saint-Jean
- Ouiatchouane River
- Lac-Bouchette, municipality
- Le Domaine-du-Roy Regional County Municipality
- Lac des Commissaires
