= Winnipeger =

Former passenger rail service

Overview
- First service: October 1904
- Last service: March 23, 1967
- Former operators: Minneapolis, St. Paul and Sault Ste. Marie Railroad and Canadian Pacific Railway

Route
- Termini: Twin Cities; Winnipeg, Manitoba
- Stops: 27
- Distance travelled: 464 miles (747 km)
- Service frequency: Daily
- Train number: 109/110, later 9/10

In October 1904 the Minneapolis, St. Paul and Sault Ste. Marie Railway (Soo Line) and Canadian Pacific Railway began overnight passenger service between the Twin Cities and Winnipeg, Manitoba. The train consisted of a mail and baggage cars, two coaches, a sleeper and dining car. The train went by several names over its 62 years: Manitoba Express (1904–1909), Winnipeg Express (1919–1928) and the Winnipeger (1928–1967). It commonly was called the Winnipeg Flyer.

Diesel locomotives replaced steam between Saint Paul and Thief River Falls, Minnesota from May 1951, and diesels took over the entire route in April of the following year. Originally numbered 109 and 110, the Winnipeger was renumbered 9 and 10 in the general renumbering of Soo Line passenger trains at the end of August 1952, but remained Trains 109 and 110 on Canadian Pacific. From January 1954, the Winnipeger was combined with Trains 13 and 14, the Soo-Dominion/Mountaineer, from Saint Paul to Glenwood, Minnesota, where the trains split, with the Soo-Dominion/Mountaineer continuing on to Canada via Portal, North Dakota. The Soo-Dominion terminated at Portal from late 1960 and came off entirely in December 1963, and through service to western Canada ran via Winnipeg on the Winnepeger.

The last season of two-section operation was 1964, when between June 26–27 and September 8–9, the Winnipeger ran as one section to Glenwood, where a meal stop was taken, dining car service having been dispensed with by 1961. The train was switched into two sections for the remainder of run to Winnipeg. Soo first 9 / Canadian Pacific 111 and CP 112 / Soo second 10 ran to/from Winnipeg (non-stop while in Canada), while Soo second 9 / CP 107 and CP 108 / Soo first 10 carried the Vancouver cars and did the local work from Emerson to Winnipeg. Saint Paul to Vancouver though service was discontinued the following year.

In May 1965, the train lost the Canada Post mail contract for the Emerson–Winnipeg run, and the following month the United States Post Office pulled the US mail off the train as well. The express contract was lost in October 1966, and the train struggled on until the night of March 23/24, 1967, when the Winnipeger made its last run.

Train 109	The Winnipeger		Train 110
Northbound (read down)	Miles	City	Southbound (read up)
8.00 p.m.	0.0	Saint Paul (Union Depot)	
8:40 p.m.	10.9	Minneapolis (Milwaukee Road depot)	8:00 a.m.
10:12 p.m.	68.0	South Haven	—
11:30 p.m. (Ar); 11:42 p.m. (Lv)	132.6	Glenwood, Minnesota	4:40 a.m. (Lv); 4:30 a.m. (Ar)
12:08 a.m.	149.2	Alexandria	4:06 a.m.
12:18 a.m.	156.3	Carlos	—
12:37 a.m.	169.1	Parker's Prairie	3:37 a.m.
12:55 a.m.	182.6	Henning	3:18 a.m.
1:57 a.m.	226.1	Detroit Lakes	2:21 a.m.
2:32 a.m.	252.4	Waubun	1:34 a.m.
2:43 a.m. (Ar); 2:56 p.m. (Lv)	261.6	Mahnomen	1:22 a.m. (Lv); 1:08 a.m. (Ar)
3:08 a.m.	270.2	Bejou	12:56 a.m.
3:18 a.m.	276.8	Winger	12:45 a.m.
3:55 a.m.	286.1	Erskine	12:31 a.m.
3:49 a.m.	296.1	Brooks	12:14 a.m.
4:00 a.m.	303.1	Plummer	12:03 a.m.
4:20 a.m. (Ar); 4:40 a.m. (Lv)	318.8	Thief River Falls	11:40 p.m. (Lv); 11:18 p.m. (Ar)
5:05 a.m.	336.7	Newfolden	10:50 p.m.
5:21 a.m.	347.4	Strandquist	10:35 p.m.
5:30 a.m.	354.3	Karlstad	10:25 p.m.
5:40 a.m.	361.3	Halma	10:15 p.m.
5:59 a.m.	367.3	Lake Bronson	9:55 p.m.
6:15 a.m.	378.0	Lancaster	9:40 p.m.
6:26 a.m.	385.6	Orleans	9:28 p.m.
6:45 a.m. (Ar)	398.9	Noyes, Minnesota	9:10 p.m.
7:30 a.m.	399.0	Emerson, Manitoba	8:55 p.m.
9:20 a.m. (Ar)	464.0	Winnipeg	6:50 p.m.
Source: Soo Line Passenger Time Table, September 1950

== See also ==
- Winnipeg Limited
