= Scotian (train) =

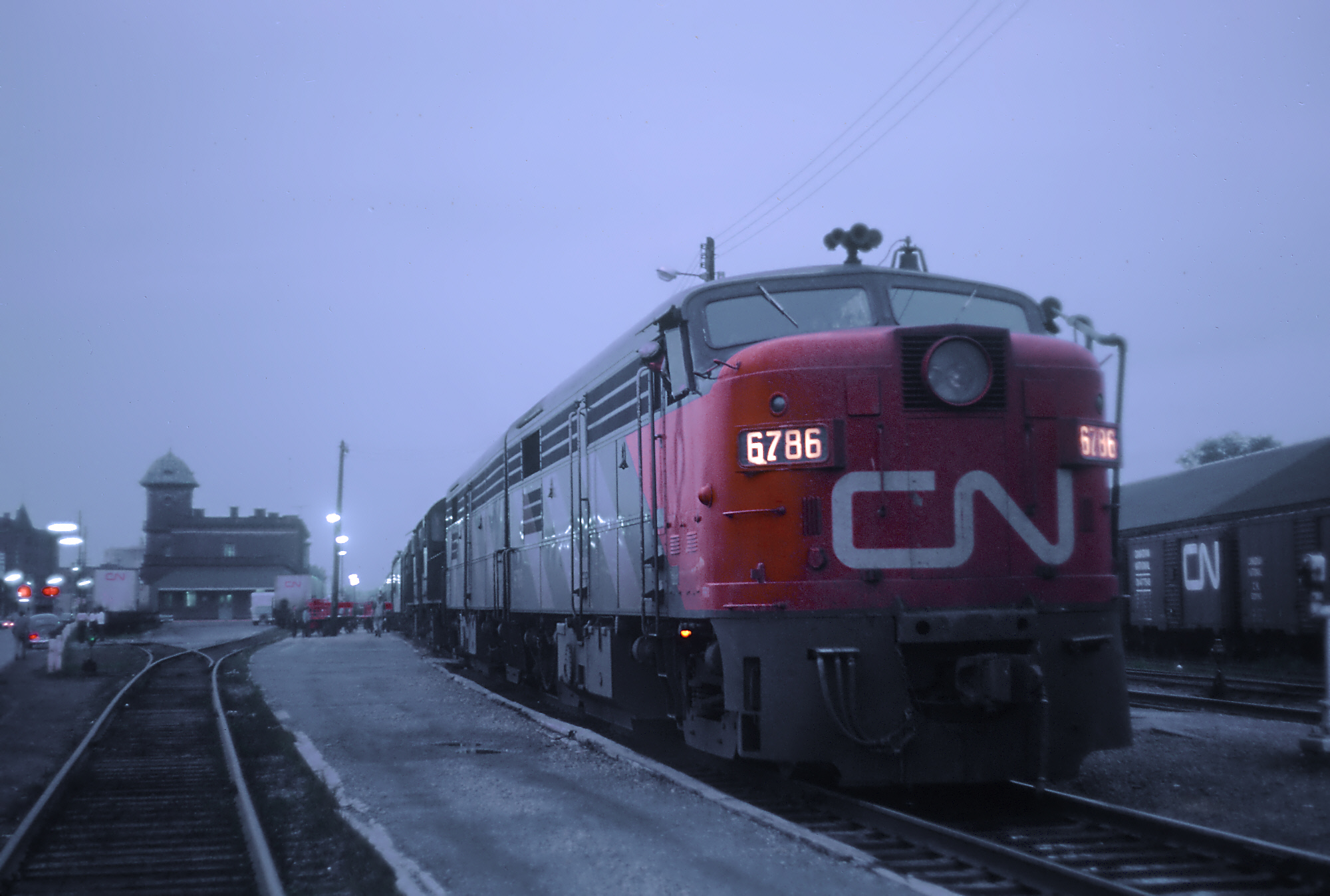
- The Scotian in 1970 heading to Halifax at Truro, Nova Scotia

Overview
- Service type: Inter-city rail
- Status: Non-operating
- Locale: Quebec, New Brunswick, Nova Scotia Canada
- First service: March 16, 1941
- Last service: October 27, 1979
- Successor: Atlantic, Saint-Laurent, Campbellton–Moncton
- Current operator: Via Rail (1978–1979)
- Former operator: CN (1941–1978)

Route
- Termini: Montreal, Quebec; Halifax, Nova Scotia
- Distance travelled: 1,346 km (836 mi)
- Service frequency: daily
- Train numbers: Canadian National Railways 59, 60; Canadian National Railways/Via Rail Canada 11, 12

On-board services
- Classes: Coach, Dayniter and Sleeper class
- Seating arrangements: Reserved Economy seating
- Catering facilities: Dining car, Service car (takeout counter)

Technical
- Track gauge: 1,435 mm (4 ft 8 1/2 in)

The Scotian was a named Canadian passenger train service that ran between Montreal, Quebec, and Halifax, Nova Scotia, and was operated by Canadian National Railways and later Via Rail Canada. The Scotian's inaugural run was March 16, 1941.

Whereas the Ocean Limited, which ran the same route, was an express train with few stops (as the "limited" name suggested) the Scotian serviced many more communities between the two cities.

== History ==
=== Discontinuance ===
In 1978, Via Rail took control of CN passenger service and began negotiations with Canadian Pacific Railway to obtain their passenger service. The takeover was complete by the summer of 1979. The decision was made to discontinue the Scotian and replace it with the Atlantic which Canadian Pacific routed through the United States. The Atlantic used the original train numbers (11 and 12) of the Scotian.

Via Rail also added two new trains to supplement the Ocean with local service on parts of the Scotian's former route. Le Saint-Laurent (trains 18 and 19) ran between Montreal and Mont-Joli, Quebec, while Rail Diesel Car service (trains 617 and 618) ran between Campbellton and Moncton, New Brunswick.
