= Lac-Bouchette =

- Municipality
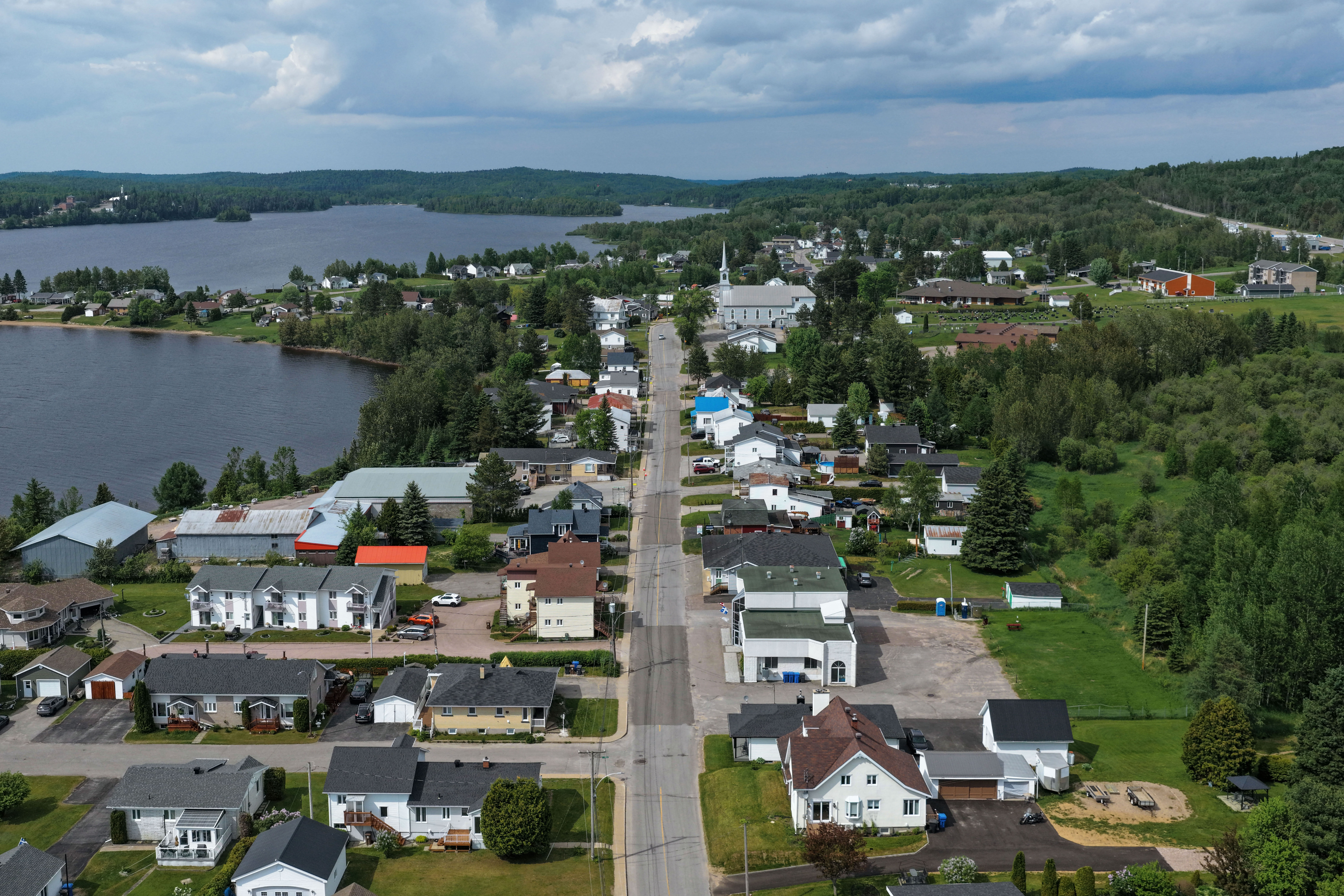

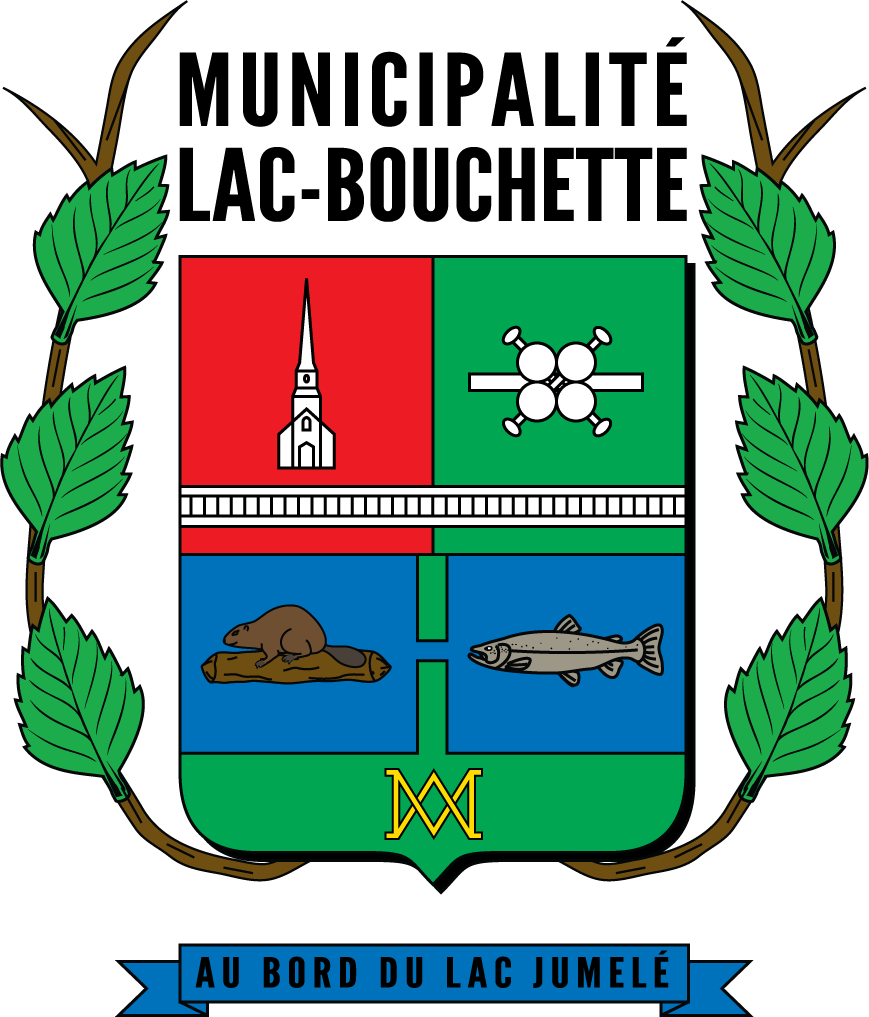
- Coat of arms

- Location in Saguenay–Lac-Saint-Jean Quebec
- Coordinates: 48°15′N 72°11′W
- Country: Canada
- Province: Quebec
- Region: Saguenay–Lac-Saint-Jean
- RCM: Le Domaine-du-Roy
- Settled: 1882
- Constituted: September 25, 1971

Government
  - Mayor: Ghislaine M.-Hudon
  - Federal riding: Lac-Saint-Jean
  - Member: Alexis Brunelle-Duceppe (BQ)
  - Prov. riding: Roberval
  - MNA: Nancy Guillemette (CAQ)

Area
  - Total: 972.20 km^{2} (375.37 sq mi)
  - Land: 904.26 km^{2} (349.14 sq mi)

Population (2021)
  - Total: 1,183
  - Density: 1.3/km^{2} (3.4/sq mi)
  - Pop (2016–21): ▼1.1%
  - Dwellings: 956
- Time zone: UTC−5 (EST)
  - Summer (DST): UTC−4 (EDT)
- Postal code(s): G0W 1V0
- Area codes: 418 and 581
- Website: municipalites-du-quebec.org/lac-bouchette/

Lac-Bouchette (French pronunciation: [lak buʃɛt]) is a municipality in Quebec, Canada. The town is located on the eastern shore of the eponymous Bouchette Lake, along Quebec Route 155 and the Canadian National Railway.

In addition to Lac-Bouchette itself, the municipality also includes the population centres of Lac-des-Commissaires and Lizote.

The municipality and lake were named in honour of Surveyor General of Lower Canada Joseph Bouchette (1774-1841).

== Geography ==
=== Climate ===
Climate data for Lac-Bouchette, Quebec (1981-2010): 358m
Month	Jan	Feb	Mar	Apr	May	Jun	Jul	Aug	Sep	Oct	Nov	Dec	Year
Record high °C (°F)	12.5 (54.5)	11.1 (52.0)	17.0 (62.6)	27.0 (80.6)	32.2 (90.0)	33.5 (92.3)	35.0 (95.0)	36.1 (97.0)	32.0 (89.6)	26.1 (79.0)	20.0 (68.0)	11.1 (52.0)	36.1 (97.0)
Mean daily maximum °C (°F)	−10.3 (13.5)	−7.5 (18.5)	−1.3 (29.7)	7.0 (44.6)	15.2 (59.4)	20.6 (69.1)	22.7 (72.9)	21.4 (70.5)	16.3 (61.3)	8.6 (47.5)	1.1 (34.0)	−6.5 (20.3)	7.3 (45.1)
Daily mean °C (°F)	−16.2 (2.8)	−13.7 (7.3)	−7.4 (18.7)	1.6 (34.9)	9.1 (48.4)	14.7 (58.5)	17.3 (63.1)	16.1 (61.0)	11.4 (52.5)	4.7 (40.5)	−2.5 (27.5)	−11.2 (11.8)	2.0 (35.6)
Mean daily minimum °C (°F)	−22.1 (−7.8)	−20.0 (−4.0)	−13.6 (7.5)	−3.8 (25.2)	2.9 (37.2)	8.7 (47.7)	11.9 (53.4)	10.7 (51.3)	6.5 (43.7)	0.7 (33.3)	−6.1 (21.0)	−15.9 (3.4)	−3.3 (26.0)
Record low °C (°F)	−47.8 (−54.0)	−46.1 (−51.0)	−38.0 (−36.4)	−30.0 (−22.0)	−12.2 (10.0)	−9.4 (15.1)	−1.1 (30.0)	−1.1 (30.0)	−8.9 (16.0)	−15.0 (5.0)	−30.0 (−22.0)	−43.9 (−47.0)	−47.8 (−54.0)
Average precipitation mm (inches)	71.8 (2.83)	55.8 (2.20)	59.6 (2.35)	72.2 (2.84)	83.9 (3.30)	88.8 (3.50)	121.4 (4.78)	107.1 (4.22)	106.0 (4.17)	86.3 (3.40)	80.2 (3.16)	82.9 (3.26)	1,016 (40.01)
Average snowfall cm (inches)	62.5 (24.6)	48.2 (19.0)	44.1 (17.4)	31.4 (12.4)	5.7 (2.2)	0.0 (0.0)	0.0 (0.0)	0.0 (0.0)	0.2 (0.1)	9.4 (3.7)	44.0 (17.3)	69.7 (27.4)	315.2 (124.1)
Average precipitation days (≥ 0.2 mm)	13.7	10.8	10.4	11.7	14.3	13.9	16.6	15.4	16.6	14.8	14.9	14.8	167.9
Average snowy days (≥ 0.2 cm)	13.0	10.0	8.3	5.0	0.9	0.0	0.0	0.0	0.1	2.3	9.2	13.4	62.2
Source: Environment Canada

== Demographics ==
Population trend:

- Population in 2021: 1,183 (2016 to 2021 population change: -1.1%)
- Population in 2016: 1,196
- Population in 2011: 1,174
- Population in 2006: 1,311
- Population in 2001: 1,370
- Population in 1996: 1,445
- Population in 1991: 1,485
- Population in 1986: 1,654
- Population in 1981: 1,703
- Population in 1976: 1,685

Private dwellings occupied by usual residents: 641 (total dwellings: 956)

Mother tongue:

- English as first language: 0.4%
- French as first language: 98.7%
- English and French as first language: 0%
- Other as first language: 0.4%
