= Atlantic (train) =

Canadian passenger train

Overview
- Service type: Inter-city rail
- Status: Discontinued
- Locale: Quebec / Maine / Maritime Provinces
- Predecessor: Atlantic Limited
- First service: October 28, 1978
- Last service: / December 16, 1994
- Former operator: Via Rail

Route
- Termini: Montreal; Halifax
- Distance travelled: 1,207 kilometres (750 mi)
- Service frequency: Thrice-weekly
- Train number: 11,12

Technical
- Track gauge: 4 ft 8 1/2 in (1,435 mm)
- Track owner: CPR

Atlantic Limited
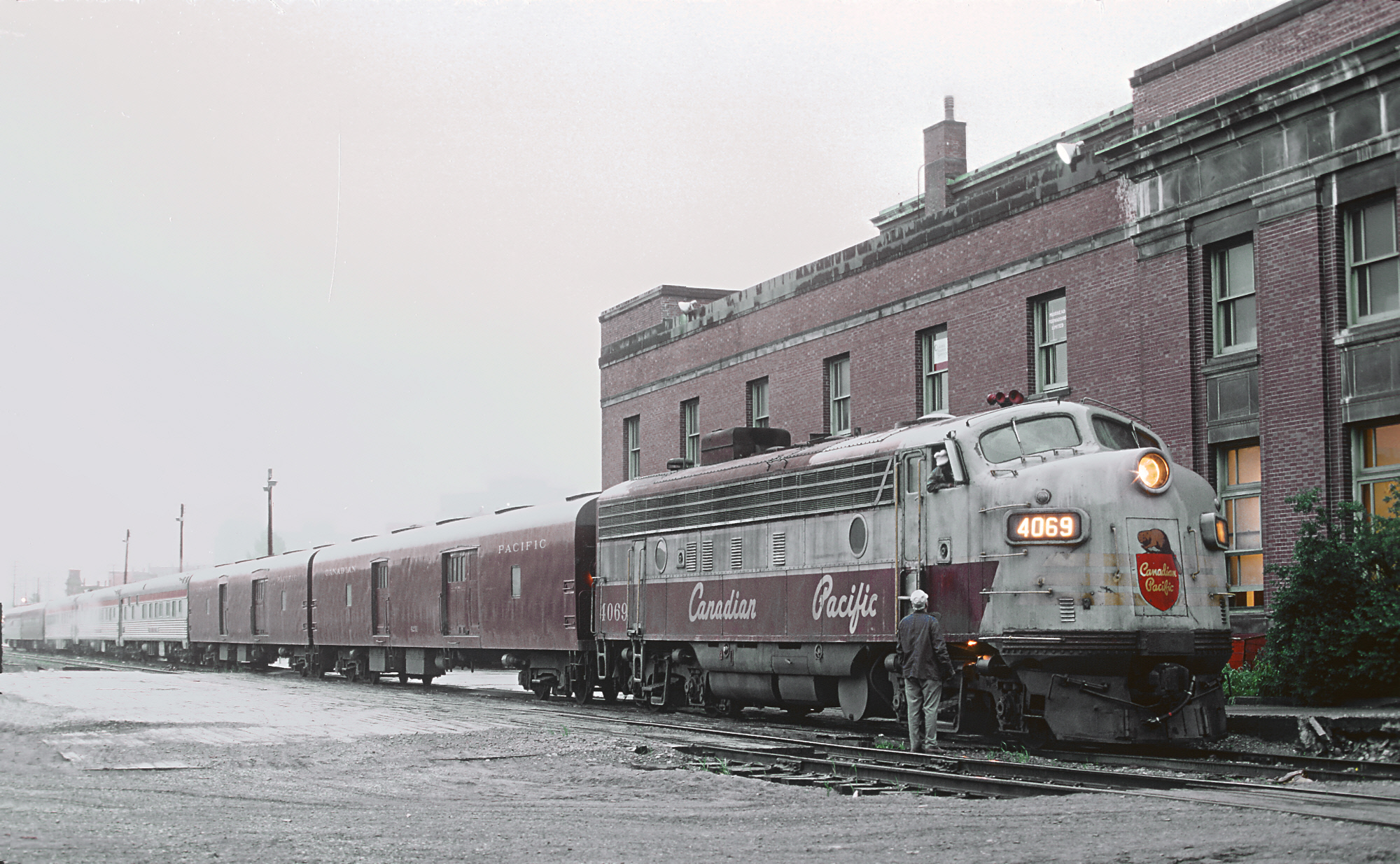
- Canadian Pacific Atlantic Limited at Saint John, NB 4 July 1970

Overview
- Service type: Inter-city rail
- Status: Discontinued
- Locale: Quebec / Maine / Maritime Provinces
- First service: September 25, 1955
- Last service: October 27, 1978
- Successor: Atlantic
- Former operator: Canadian Pacific Railway

Route
- Termini: Montreal; Saint John
- Distance travelled: 776 kilometres (482 mi)
- Train number: 41,42

On-board services
- Seating arrangements: Coaches
- Sleeping arrangements: Sections, roomettes and double bedrooms
- Catering facilities: Dining car
- Observation facilities: lounge parlor car

Technical
- Track gauge: 4 ft 8 1/2 in (1,435 mm)

The Atlantic (French: L'Atlantique) was a passenger train operated by Via Rail, serving both Canadian and U.S. territory between Montreal, Quebec, and Halifax, Nova Scotia. It was previously operated by Canadian Pacific Railway as The Atlantic Limited between Montreal and Saint John, New Brunswick. It formed part of the transcontinental service for both systems.

The Atlantic and its predecessor The Atlantic Limited (along with several other CPR local trains) was the only passenger rail service in the U.S. state of Maine from the late 1960s until discontinuance of operations in December 1994. (Maine is now served by Amtrak's Downeaster.) The Atlantic also holds a unique spot in U.S. railroading history as it operated the last regular-service steam-heated passenger train in the United States until Via converted its trainsets to "head end power" in 1993.

Since its cancellation, citizen's groups in southern New Brunswick and the Eastern Townships of Quebec have periodically organized petitions or lobbied to have Via Rail Canada reinstate passenger service to this route.

== The Atlantic Limited ==
Inaugurated by the Canadian Pacific Railway (CPR) as a "limited stop" service on September 25, 1955, The Atlantic Limited used numbers 41/42 (westbound/eastbound) and took the schedule and equipment for what were previously numbered trains between Montreal, Quebec (Windsor Station) and Saint John, New Brunswick (Union Station). The service operated overnight using the CPR's former International Railway of Maine line which formed the direct route between Saint John and Montreal. Although this was CPR's first named passenger train to the Maritimes, daily passenger service had been offered since 1889.

The Atlantic Limited saw the first major change to its route around 1970 when the Saint John Union Station was demolished and CPR's Mill Street yard redeveloped to accommodate the Saint John Throughway and associated urban redevelopment. A new passenger station was built on the city's west side in the former city of Lancaster where new rail yards were developed. During the 1970s, CPR operated the service at minimal levels with usually a single 1800-class E8 locomotive (one of only three, later two, operated in Canada, both by CPR) and a baggage, coach, diner, and sleeper car. Some of the stainless steel Budd Company cars originally ordered for The Canadian also made their way onto this train and there was infrequent availability of a dome car as well.

While The Atlantic Limited name was only used officially after 1955 on the Montreal-Saint John service, the name, or a variation of it, has possibly seen use for a service which operated on CPR and CPR-subsidiary Soo Line between Minneapolis, Minnesota, via Sault Ste. Marie, Ottawa, Ontario, and Montreal, Quebec, to Saint John, New Brunswick, beginning in 1889 following the completion of the line to Saint John. It is possible that the name "Atlantic Limited" was officially used on the Soo Line portion between Minneapolis-Sault Ste. Marie, although only numbered trains officially existed east of Montreal between 1889 and 1955. An extension to the Minneapolis-Montreal-Saint John service operated between Montreal and Boston, Massachusetts (in partnership with the Boston and Maine Railroad), possibly using the name Atlantic Express.

== Atlantic ==
In 1978, Via Rail was created out of a Canadian National Railway subsidiary to become Canada's national passenger rail service. In October of that year, Via negotiated the take-over of CPR passenger service, although routes, equipment and schedules did not change until the summer of 1979. Thus for the first few months after Via was created, the company included The Atlantic Limited in its timetable and the service continued to operate using the same CPR equipment and crews. In the summer of 1979, this was changed with the name The Atlantic Limited shortened to the bilingually appropriate Atlantic/Atlantique.

At the same time, service was extended effective October 1979 with a new eastern terminus at Halifax, Nova Scotia and the 1970s-era CPR passenger station in Saint John was closed in lieu of a new station in that city's downtown. The extension of the train to Halifax was made possible by Via's decision to not continue a CN train named the Scotian, thus the Atlantic assumed that train's numbers of 11/12 (westbound/eastbound) and equipment.

Under Via, the Atlantic became a well-used train, given the shorter route (by 150 miles) over the Ocean, and the fact that the Atlantic served the cities of Saint John and Sherbrooke, in addition to a number of smaller towns and villages in between.

However increased patronage of the Atlantic did not meet Via targets, although some might say it did not cross as much politically crucial territory in Quebec as the Ocean. Thus in the Via budget cuts by the Trudeau government in 1981, the Atlantic was terminated in lieu of Budd RDC service between Halifax-Moncton-Saint John-Fredericton. During this time, Fredericton saw its first passenger trains since the early 1960s when Rail Diesel Cars were instituted from Halifax via Moncton and Saint John to replace the Atlantic's connections.

Southwestern New Brunswickers were incensed at the cutting of the Atlantic's route, one which had seen daily passenger rail service in both directions between Saint John and Montreal since the International Railway of Maine opened in 1889. Community leaders along the route, led by rookie Saint John mayor Elsie Wayne, quickly rallied local populations to lobby the federal government. After several years and a personal promise by Brian Mulroney that his government would reinstate Via service on the route, the PC Party won election in 1984 and that December it was announced that the Atlantic would be returning to the rails.

In August 1985 the train was reinstated on its former route between Halifax and Montreal, although Via made some changes to its operations in the Maritimes to accommodate the Atlantic. The Ocean service was actually downgraded to just a Montreal-Moncton train with a platform connection to them through Atlantic. This lasted until the 1989 budget cuts to Via which saw service on both routes reduced to 3 days/week in each direction (alternating days) beginning on January 15, 1990. From 1990 until December 16, 1994, the Atlantic operated consistently on its 3 day/week service which saw it share an equipment pool with the Ocean.

In 1993, the owner of the tracks between Saint John and Montreal, CPR, began to look for potential buyers of its former International Railway of Maine and associated lines. When it became apparent by summer 1994 that a buyer would not be found, CPR began the formal process of applying to abandon the entire route. Faced with uncertainty about the continuance of the operation after the abandonment date of December 31, Via announced in October of that year that it would terminate the Atlantic effective December 17 (last trains leaving December 16) and switch its equipment to the Ocean which would jump to a 6 day/week schedule in each direction. Prior to the discontinuance of the Atlantic, CPR announced that it had made an agreement in principle with J.D. Irving Limited to buy the line and operate it as a shortline to be called New Brunswick Southern Railway, however, Via was not permitted at this time to operate on a shortline railway. Federal regulations stated that it must operate on one of the two national railways of Canada.

Abandonment of passenger service for the second time on this route (by the same political party) was especially controversial for southwestern New Brunswickers who viewed it as a convenient excuse by the federal government to cut the service for both shortsighted fiscal and strategic political reasons. Paul Martin was making aggressive budget cuts throughout the federal government, thus concentrating service on the Ocean's route would likely save some money. The Ocean also travelled a route that passed through then-Minister of Transport Doug Young's riding of Acadie-Bathurst. The Atlantic also passed through the only two ridings in the country which elected Progressive Conservatives - Elsie Wayne in Saint John and Jean Charest in Sherbrooke. It also didn't help that the Atlantic passed through Maine (U.S. territory) on its short route between Montreal and Saint John.

== Route ==
=== Canadian Pacific Railway ===
The route taken by The Atlantic Limited operated entirely on CPR trackage and passed through a scenic portion of eastern Canada and northern New England including the Island of Montreal and the city's skyline and suburbs, the Richelieu River valley, the hills of the Eastern Townships, the Appalachian Mountains of western and central Maine, the level plateau and forests of eastern Maine, and the forests and mixed farmland in the Saint John River valley. The route taken by the Atlantic Limited between Saint John and Montreal is the most direct rail link between the two cities.

In the final mid-20th century peak level of passenger service, connections with Bangor & Aroostook trains were available in Greenville, Maine and with the Aroostook Flyer in Brownville Junction.

=== Via Rail ===
Following the assumption of service by Via Rail in 1979 until discontinuance in 1981 and restoration of service in 1985 until discontinuance in 1994, the Atlantic followed a somewhat different route, with the most obvious change being the extension over CN trackage east of Saint John to Halifax. There was a subtle change between Montreal and Lennoxville too, where Via wished to consolidate its trains at the former CN Central Station in Montreal. Leaving Montreal, the Atlantic followed the route of the Ocean on CN trackage through Saint-Hyacinthe, where it turned south and followed the Saint-François River valley into the Eastern Townships to Sherbrooke where it regained CP tracks. From Sherbrooke to Saint John, the Atlantic followed the same route as its predecessor The Atlantic Limited. East of Saint John, the train regained CN tracks and followed a similarly scenic route through the Kennebecasis River valley and its mixed farmland to Moncton and then followed the same route as the Ocean crossing the Tantramar Marshes, the Wentworth Valley, the edge of Cobequid Bay and mixed farmland through central Nova Scotia to Halifax.

== See also ==
- Ocean (train)
- The Scotian (train)
