= Chambord, Quebec =

Chambord
- Municipality
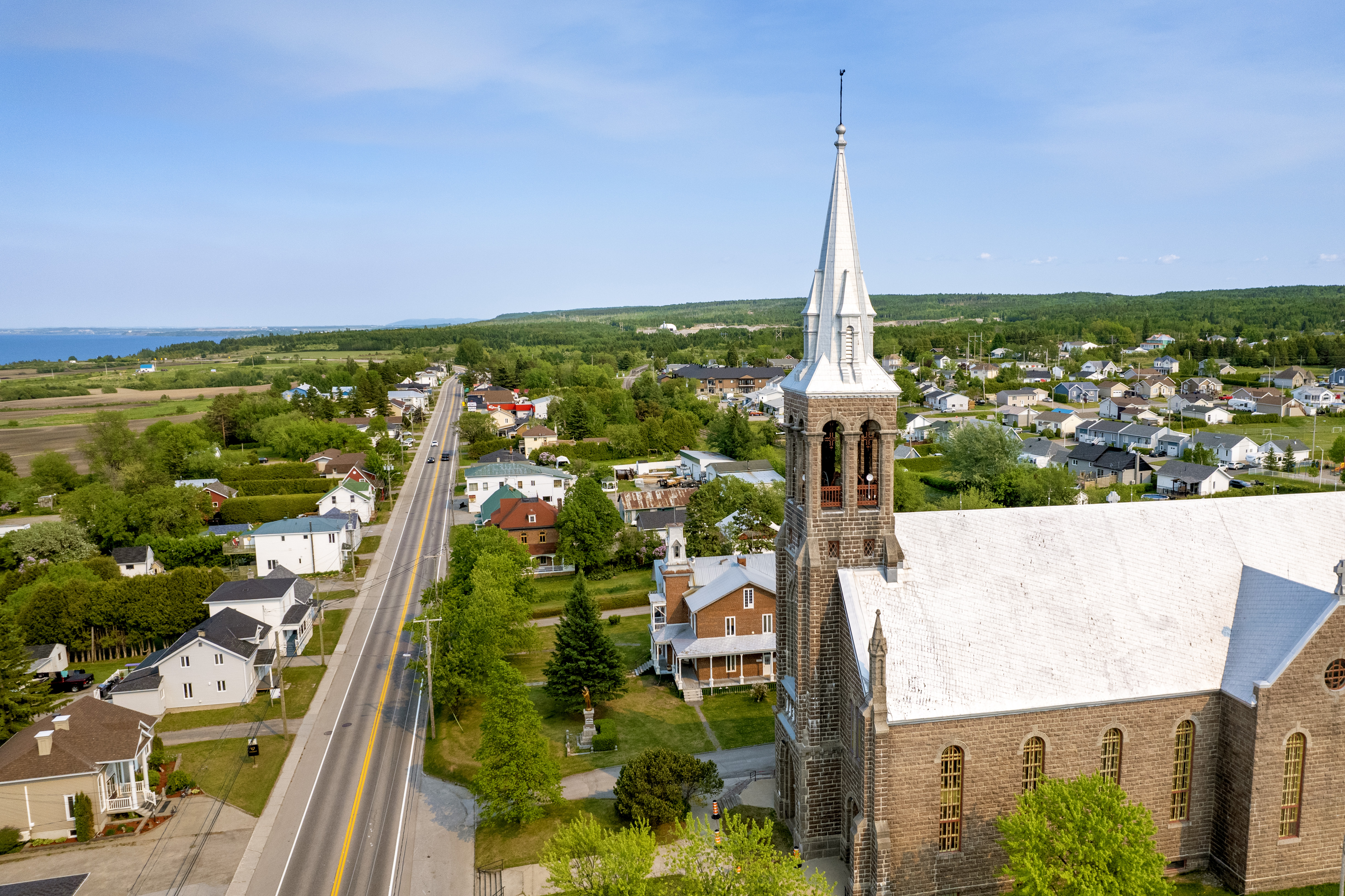
- Aerial view of Chambord

- Coat of arms

- Location in Saguenay–Lac-Saint-Jean Quebec.
- Coordinates: 48°26′N 72°04′W
- Country: Canada
- Province: Quebec
- Region: Saguenay–Lac-Saint-Jean
- RCM: Le Domaine-du-Roy
- Settled: 1857
- Constituted: December 8, 1973

Government
  - Mayor: Luc Chiasson
  - Federal riding: Lac-Saint-Jean
  - Prov. riding: Roberval

Area
  - Total: 170.90 km^{2} (65.98 sq mi)
  - Land: 120.85 km^{2} (46.66 sq mi)

Population (2021)
  - Total: 1,748
  - Density: 14.5/km^{2} (38/sq mi)
  - Pop (2016–21): ▼1.0%
  - Dwellings: 1,186
- Time zone: UTC−5 (EST)
  - Summer (DST): UTC−4 (EDT)
- Postal code(s): G0W 1G0
- Area codes: 418 and 581
- Climate: Dfb
- Website: www.chambord.ca

Chambord (French pronunciation: [ʃɑ̃bɔʁ]) is a municipality in Le Domaine-du-Roy Regional County Municipality in the Saguenay–Lac-Saint-Jean region of Quebec, Canada. The Chambord meteorite was found near here in 1904.

The municipality also includes the community of Val-Jalbert, located along Quebec Route 169 between the village of Chambord itself and Roberval.

== Demographics ==
Population trend:

- Population in 2021: 1,748 (2016 to 2021 population change: -0.1%)
- Population in 2016: 1,765
- Population in 2011: 1,773
- Population in 2006: 1,690
- Population in 2001: 1,693
- Population in 1996: 1,784
- Population in 1991: 1,739
- Population in 1986: 1,705
- Population in 1981: 1,723
- Population in 1976: 1,755

Private dwellings occupied by usual residents: 849 (total dwellings: 1,186)

Mother tongue:

- English as first language: 0.3%
- French as first language: 98.9%
- English and French as first language: 0%
- Other as first language: 0.3%

== Attractions ==
The historical village of Val-Jalbert is Chambord's main tourist attraction. There is also an annual cowboy festival.

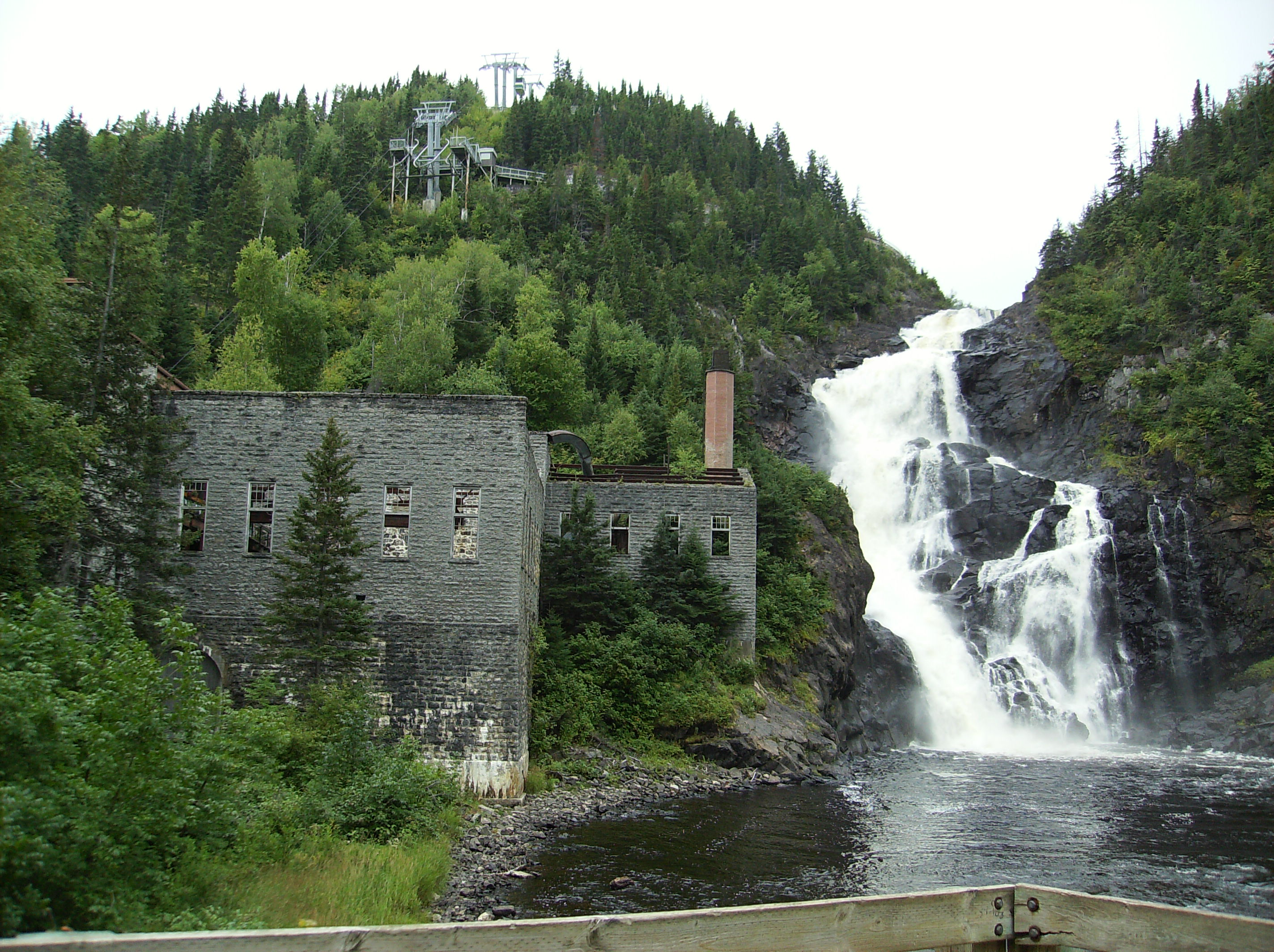
Old mill and waterfall on the Ouiatchouane River in Val-Jalbert.

== Infrastructure ==
Chambord is at the intersection of Quebec highways 155 and 169, and is also served by the Montreal – Jonquière train passenger train of Via Rail Canada, which operates between Montreal and Jonquière.
