= Starr Lake (Lac-Saint-Jean-Est) =

Lake in Quebec, Canada

- Location in Quebec
- Location: Belle-Rivière (TNO), Lac-Saint-Jean-Est Regional County Municipality, Saguenay–Lac-Saint-Jean
- Coordinates: 48.01472°N 71.915°W
- Lake type: Natural
- Primary inflows: Discharge of 13 mountain streams, one of which drains Falcon Lake.
- Primary outflows: Moncouche River (via Moncouche Lake)
- Basin countries: Canada
- Max. length: 3.0 km (1.9 mi)
- Max. width: 1.0 km (0.62 mi)
- Surface elevation: 491 m (1,611 ft)

The lac Starr (English: Starr Lake) is a freshwater body in the head area of the Moncouche River (via the lac Moncouche), in the unorganized territory of Belle-Rivière, in the Lac-Saint-Jean-Est Regional County Municipality, in the administrative region from Saguenay–Lac-Saint-Jean, in the province of Quebec, in Canada. Lac Starr is located just north of the northwestern limit of the Laurentides Wildlife Reserve. Its location is almost at the limit of the administrative regions of Saguenay–Lac-Saint-Jean and Capitale-Nationale.

Many forest roads surround the Starr Lake area for forestry and recreational tourism activities.

Forestry is the main economic activity in the sector; recreational tourism, is second.

The surface of Lake Starr is usually frozen from the beginning of December to the end of March. However, the safe circulation on the ice is generally done from mid-December to mid-March.

== Geography ==
The main hydrographic slopes near Lake Starr are:

- North side: Huard Lake, Métabetchouane River, rivière aux Canots;
- East side: Contourné stream, rivière aux Canots;
- South side: Lac aux Écorces, Métascouac Lake, Contourné stream, rivière aux Montagnais;
- West side: Métabetchouane River, Rivière de la Chaine.

Lake Starr features is landlocked between the mountains. It has a length of 3.0 kilometres (1.9 mi), a width of 1.0 kilometre (0.62 mi), an altitude of 491 metres (1,611 ft). Its mouth is located to the southeast at the bottom of a narrow bay 0.8 kilometres (0.50 mi) long, ie:

- 7.3 kilometres (4.5 mi) north-east of the mouth of Moncouche Lake;
- 11.3 kilometres (7.0 mi) north-east of the confluence of the Moncouche River and the Métabetchouane River;
- 11.9 kilometres (7.4 mi) north-east of Métabetchouane Lake;
- 19.1 kilometres (11.9 mi) north-east of Kiskissink station of the Canadian National railway;
- 26.8 kilometres (16.7 mi) to the east of route 155, connecting La Tuque to Chambord;
- 47.1 kilometres (29.3 mi) south-east of the confluence of the Métabetchouane River and Lac Saint-Jean.

From the mouth of lake Starr, the current descends Moncouche River on 14.7 kilometres (9.1 mi) generally southward, the Métabetchouane River northward on 83.9 kilometres (52.1 mi) to the south shore of lac Saint-Jean; then, the current crosses the latter on 22.8 kilometres (14.2 mi) towards the northeast, then follows the course of the Saguenay River via La Petite Décharge on 172.3 kilometres (107.1 mi) to Tadoussac where it merges with the Saint Lawrence estuary.

== Toponymy ==
The toponym "lac Starr" was formalized on August 28, 1973, by the Commission de toponymie du Québec.

== See also ==
- Saint-Véran Lake
- List of lakes of Canada
