= Lac Pika =

Lake in Lac-Achouakan, Quebec, Canada

- Interactive map of Lac Pika
- Location: Lac-Achouakan
- Coordinates: 48°1′24″N 71°34′14″W
- Lake type: Natural
- Primary inflows: Décharge du lac Audubon, la décharge des lacs Pluton, Neptune de l’Arsin et de la Ravine, ainsi que la décharge du lac Riffon.
- Primary outflows: Pika River
- Basin countries: Canada
- Max. length: 2.4 km (1.5 mi)
- Max. width: 0.7 km (0.43 mi)
- Surface elevation: 557 m (1,827 ft)

The Lac Pika is a fresh body of water constituting the main head lake of the Pika River on the watershed of the Saguenay River. Lac Pika is located in the unorganized territory of Lac-Achouakan, in the Lac-Saint-Jean-Est Regional County Municipality, in the administrative region of the Saguenay–Lac-Saint-Jean, in the province of Quebec, in Canada. This lake is located in the Laurentides Wildlife Reserve.

This small valley is served indirectly by the route 169 and some secondary roads for the needs of forestry, recreational tourism activities.

Forestry is the main economic activity in the sector; recreational tourism is the second.

The surface of Lac Pika is usually frozen from the beginning of December to the end of March, however the safe circulation on the ice is generally made from mid-December to mid-March.

== Geography ==
The main watersheds near Lac Pika are:

- north side: Pika River, Riendeau Lake, Scott Lake, Clarence-Gagnon Lake, Pikauba River;
- east side: Hocquart Lake, Gobeil stream, Gobeil lake, Rivière aux Canots Est;
- south side: Riffon lake, Panache lake, rivière aux Canots, Girard stream;
- west side: Neptune lake, Cadieux lake, Audubon lake, Raquette stream, Écluse stream, Sancto stream, rivière aux Écorces.

Lac Pika has a length of 2.4 km (1.5 mi) in the shape of an inverted V, a width of 0.7 km (0.43 mi) and an altitude of 557 m (1,827 ft). This lake is narrowing due to a peninsula attached to the southwest shore. This lake is mainly fed by the outlet of Lake Audubon (coming from the northwest), the outlet (coming from the West) of Lakes Pluto, Neptune de l'Arsin and Ravine, as well as the outlet of Lake Riffon ( coming from the south). The mouth of this lake is located at:

- 0.3 km (0.19 mi) west of Hocquart Lake (formerly known as "Petit lac Pika");
- 2.1 km (1.3 mi) north-west of Lac du Panache (slope of the Rivière aux Canots);
- 5.3 km (3.3 mi) southeast of Lac Morin;
- 6.4 km (4.0 mi) north-west of the confluence of the Rivière aux Canots and Rivière aux Canots Est;
- 7.9 km (4.9 mi) south-west of route 169;
- 13.5 km (8.4 mi) south of the confluence of the Pika river and the Pikauba River;
- 11.3 km (7.0 mi) east of Rivière aux Écorces.

From the mouth of Lac Pika, the current follows the course of the Pika River on 20.5 km (12.7 mi) consecutively, the course of the Pikauba River on 35.0 km (21.7 mi) north to the confluence with Kenogami Lake; it crosses this lake for 17.6 km (10.9 mi) north-east until dam of Portage-des-Roches; it follows the course of the Chicoutimi River on 26.2 km (16.3 mi) to the east, then the northeast and the course of the Saguenay River on 114.6 km (71.2 mi) east to Tadoussac where it merges with the Saint Lawrence estuary.

== Toponymy ==
The toponym "Lac Pika" was formalized on December 5, 1968, by the Commission de toponymie du Québec.

== Appendices ==
=== Related articles ===
- Lac-Saint-Jean-Est Regional County Municipality
- Lac-Achouakan, a TNO
- Saguenay River
- Chicoutimi River
- Kenogami Lake
- Pikauba River
- Pika River
- List of lakes in Canada
