= Morin River =

River in Canada

- Location within Quebec

Location
- Country: Canada
- Province: Quebec
- Region: Saguenay-Lac-Saint-Jean
- Regional County Municipality: Le Fjord-du-Saguenay Regional County Municipality
- Unorganized territory: Lac-Ministuk

Physical characteristics
- Source: Mountain stream
  - location: Lac-Ministuk
  - coordinates: 48.02054°N 71.62894°W
  - elevation: 590 m (1,940 ft)
- Mouth: Rivière aux Écorces
  - location: Lac-Ministuk
  - coordinates: 48.21194°N 71.55972°W
  - elevation: 340 m (1,120 ft)
- Length: 33.1 km (20.6 mi)
- Discharge
  - location: Lac-Ministuk

Basin features
- Tributaries
  - left: (from the mouth) Décharge du Lac des Trois Îles, décharge du lac Choquette, décharge du lac des Panicauts.
  - right: (from the mouth) Décharge du lac Fermé et du lac du Couloir, décharge du lac Morin, décharge des lacs de l'Éminence, Supra et Annelet, décharge du lac Cadieux.

The Morin river is a tributary of the Rivière aux Écorces, flowing in the unorganized territory of Lac-Ministuk, in the Le Fjord-du-Saguenay Regional County Municipality, in the administrative region of Saguenay–Lac-Saint-Jean, in the province of Quebec, in Canada. The course of the Morin River crosses the northwestern part of the Laurentides Wildlife Reserve.

The small Morin River valley is located near route 169. This valley is also served by some secondary forest roads, especially for forestry and recreational tourism activities.

Forestry is the main economic activity in this valley; recreational tourism, second.

The surface of the Morin River is usually frozen from the beginning of December to the end of March, however safe circulation on the ice is generally made from mid-December to mid-March.

== Geography ==
This watercourse flows parallel to the Rivière aux Écorces before flowing into it, near the Sawine River. It drains in particular Lake Morin and Lake Cadieux, formerly called Petit Lake Morin, whose respective areas are 0.98 square kilometres (0.38 sq mi) and 0.05 square kilometres (0.019 sq mi). The Morin River crosses the road connecting Quebec (city) to Lac-Saint-Jean, in the northern part of the Laurentides Wildlife Reserve; both the lake and the river are used for speckled trout fishing.

The main watersheds neighboring the Morin River are:

- north side: Alexis lake, Bras des Angers, Pikauba River, Plessis stream, Barnabé stream, ruisseau L'Abbé, Rivière aux Écorces;
- east side: Sawine River, Pika River, Pikauba River, Le Grand Ruisseau, Damasse stream, Petite rivière Pikauba, Cyriac River;
- south side: Girard stream, Blanc stream, Pika River, Rivière aux Canots;
- west side: Rivière aux Écorces, Thom stream, Paul stream, Lac de la Belle Rivière, Carpe lake, Métabetchouane River.

The Morin River originates from a mountain stream (altitude: 590 metres (1,940 ft)) in a forest area in the Laurentides Wildlife Reserve. This source is located at:

- 6.0 kilometres (3.7 mi) south of Morin Lake;
- 3.8 kilometres (2.4 mi) west of Pika Lake;
- 5.2 kilometres (3.2 mi) west of Hocquart Lake;
- 5.0 kilometres (3.1 mi) north of Rivière aux Canots;
- 6.6 kilometres (4.1 mi) east of the Rivière aux Écorces;
- 10.6 kilometres (6.6 mi) south-west of route 169;
- 22.0 kilometres (13.7 mi) south of the confluence of the Morin river and the Rivière aux Écorces;
- 49.2 kilometres (30.6 mi) south-east of lac Saint-Jean.

From its source, the Morin river flows over 33.1 kilometres (20.6 mi) with a drop of 250 metres (820 ft) entirely in the forest zone, according to the following segments:

Upper course of the Morin River (segment of 9.5 kilometres (5.9 mi))

- 4.3 kilometres (2.7 mi) towards the north, curving towards the northwest at the end of the segment up to the outlet (coming from the northwest) of Lac des Panicauts;
- 1.6 kilometres (0.99 mi) towards the north-east, forming a hook towards the east, up to the outlet (coming from the south) of Lac Cadieux;
- 1.9 kilometres (1.2 mi) northwards to the outlet (coming from the south-east) of the lakes of Eminence, Gareau and the Ephemera;
- 1.7 kilometres (1.1 mi) to the north, forming small coils up to the outlet (coming from the southeast) of Lac Morin;

Intermediate course of the Morin River (segment of 13.7 kilometres (8.5 mi))

- 7.1 kilometres (4.4 mi) towards the northwest by forming small streamers at the end of the segment up to the outlet (coming from the west) of Choquette Lake;
- 4.9 kilometres (3.0 mi) first towards the east, then towards the north by forming a large curve towards the east, then forming a loop towards the west at the end of the segment, up to a stream (coming from the east);
- 1.7 kilometres (1.1 mi) towards the northwest by forming a hook towards the north, up to the highway 169 bridge;

Lower course of the Morin River (segment of 9.9 kilometres (6.2 mi))

- 0.5 kilometres (0.31 mi) north-west, to the outlet (coming from the south-west) of the Lac des Trois Îles;
- 3.9 kilometres (2.4 mi) towards the north-west, meandering through a plain comprising three areas of marshes to the east shore of Lac Gatien;
- 0.9 kilometres (0.56 mi) towards the north-east, bypassing a peninsula from the west across the lake in Gatien (length: 1.2 kilometres (0.75 mi); altitude: 351 metres (1,152 ft)) formed by the widening of the river, up to its mouth. Note: this lake is surrounded by marshes. It is fed by the Toupillons pond and Lor lake;
- 3.7 kilometres (2.3 mi) north-east in the marsh zone at the start of the segment, forming a large S, then crossing the lake in Arche (length: 1.5 kilometres (0.93 mi); altitude: 341 metres (1,119 ft)) formed by the widening of the river, up to its mouth;
- 0.9 kilometres (0.56 mi) north-east, to its mouth.

The Morin River flows onto the south bank of the Rivière aux Écorces. This confluence is located at:

- 0.3 kilometres (0.19 mi) south-west of the confluence of the Sawine River and the Rivière aux Écorces;
- 7.9 kilometres (4.9 mi) west of the Pikauba River;
- 8.4 kilometres (5.2 mi) north-east of lac de la Belle Rivière;
- 9.9 kilometres (6.2 mi) south of the confluence of the Pikauba and the Écorces rivers;
- 15.5 kilometres (9.6 mi) south-west of the confluence of the Pikauba River and Kenogami Lake;
- 43.6 kilometres (27.1 mi) southwest of the confluence of the Chicoutimi River and the Saguenay River in the Chicoutimi sector of the city of Saguenay (city).

From the mouth of the Morin river, the current successively follows the course of the Rivière aux Écorces on 13.6 kilometres (8.5 mi) towards the northeast, the course of the Pikauba River on 10.6 kilometres (6.6 mi) generally towards the north, crosses Kenogami Lake on 17.6 kilometres (10.9 mi) towards the northeast until barrage de Portage-des-Roches, then follows the course of the river Chicoutimi on 26.2 kilometres (16.3 mi) to the east, then the northeast and the course of the Saguenay river on 114.6 kilometres (71.2 mi) east to Tadoussac where it merges with the Saint Lawrence estuary.

== Toponymy ==
In 1914, this watercourse appeared on a map under the name of "Rivière Vaseuse"; in 1928, the same name appears on another card accompanied by the variant "Rivière Morin". This last toponym is indicated later on maps of 1943 and 1954.

The name of Morin evokes the life work of Joseph Morin (Baie-Saint-Paul, 1854 - Québec, 1915), merchant, farmer and secretary-treasurer of the Charlevoix municipality, before embarking on active politics. He was elected Liberal MP for the riding of Charlevoix from 1886 to 1897, then re-elected in 1900. Not having stood in the 1904 election, he was appointed governor of the prison in Quebec (city) two years later, a post he held from 1906 to 1915.

More than a hundred geographic entities, essentially lakes and small rivers, evoke various people of this patronym in different regions of Quebec territory.

The toponym "Rivière Morin" was formalized on December 5, 1968, at the Place Names Bank of the Commission de toponymie du Québec.

== See also ==
- Saguenay Regional County Municipality
- Lac-Ministuk, Quebec
- Laurentides Wildlife Reserve
- Rivière aux Écorces
- Pikauba River
- Kenogami Lake
- Chicoutimi River
- Saguenay River
- List of rivers of Quebec
