= Moncouche =

Moncouche may refer to:

- Lac-Moncouche, Quebec, an unorganized territory in Lac-Saint-Jean-Est Regional County Municipality, Saguenay–Lac-Saint-Jean, Quebec, Canada
- Moncouche Lake (Mont-Valin), Mont-Valin, Le Fjord-du-Saguenay Regional County Municipality, Saguenay–Lac-Saint-Jean, Quebec, Canada
- Moncouche Lake (Lac-Saint-Jean-Est), Lac-Moncouche, Lac-Saint-Jean-Est Regional County Municipality, Saguenay–Lac-Saint-Jean, Quebec, Canada
- Moncouche River, a tributary of Métabetchouane River in Lac-Jacques-Cartier, Quebec, Canada

== See also ==
- Monocouche renders, a type of decorative finish applied to the outside of buildings to provide both decoration and weather protection
- Simoncouche River, Saguenay, Saguenay–Lac-Saint-Jean, Quebec, Canada
