= Pika River =

River in Saguenay-Lac-Saint-Jean, Quebec, Canada

- Location within Quebec

Location
- Country: Canada
- Province: Quebec
- Region: Saguenay-Lac-Saint-Jean
- Regional County Municipality: Le Fjord-du-Saguenay Regional County Municipality
- Unorganized territory and a city: Lac-Achouakan and Lac-Ministuk

Physical characteristics
- Source: Pika Lake
  - location: Lac-Achouakan
  - coordinates: 48.01222°N 71.56714°W
  - elevation: 557
- Mouth: Pikauba River
  - location: Lac-Ministuk
  - coordinates: 48.11694°N 71.48°W
  - elevation: 410 m (1,350 ft)
- Length: 20.5 km (12.7 mi)
- Discharge
  - location: Lac-Ministuk

Basin features
- Tributaries
  - left: (from the mouth) Décharge du lac Janvry, décharge du lac Scott, du lac Clarence Gagnon, du lac du Merle et du lac de la Niche, décharge (via Pika Lake) du lac Audubon, décharge (via Pika Lake) des lacs Neptune et Pluton.
  - right: (from the mouth) Ruisseau Savard, ruisseau Gobeil (via Hocquart Lake), décharge (via Hocquart Lake) du lac Larivière.

The Rivière Pika is a freshwater tributary of the Pikauba River, flowing in the administrative region of Saguenay–Lac-Saint-Jean, in the province of Quebec, in Canada. This watercourse successively crosses the regional county municipalities of:

- MRC Lac-Saint-Jean-Est Regional County Municipality, in the unorganized territory of Lac-Achouakan;
- MRC du Le Fjord-du-Saguenay Regional County Municipality, in the unorganized territory of Lac-Ministuk.

The upper part of the Pika River valley is accessible by route 169 (route d'Hébertville); other secondary forest roads have been developed in the sector for forestry and recreational tourism activities.

Forestry is the primary economic activity in the sector; recreational tourism, second.

The surface of the Pika River is usually frozen from late November to early April, however safe circulation on the ice is generally from mid-December to late March.

== Geography ==
Draining small lakes in the northern part of the Laurentides wildlife reserve, the Pika river, a small tributary of the left bank of the Pikauba river, flows over approximately 16.37 km from Little Pika lake and Pika Lake.

The main watersheds neighboring the Pika River are:

- north side: Pikauba River, Bras des Angers, Dominus stream, Sauce stream, Petite rivière Pikauba;
- east side: Pikauba river, Savard brook, Little Pikauba river, Suzor-Côté lake, Bousquet lake, Sekaw lake, Gobeil brook, Cyriac River;
- south side: Lac du Panache, Rivière aux Canots, Rivière aux Canots Est, Riffon Lake, Girard stream;
- west side: Rivière aux Écorces, Pika Lake, Lac Audubon, Lac Cadieux, Morin River, Lac Morin.

The Pika River rises at the mouth of Pika Lake (altitude: 557 km (346 mi)). The mouth which is on the north shore of this head lake is located at:

- 0.3 km (0.19 mi) west of Hocquart Lake (formerly known as "Petit lac Pika");
- 2.1 km (1.3 mi) north-west of Lac du Panache (slope of rivière aux Canots);
- 5.3 km (3.3 mi) southeast of Lac Morin;
- 6.4 km (4.0 mi) north-west of the confluence of rivière aux Canots and Rivière aux Canots Est;
- 7.9 km (4.9 mi) south-west of route 169;
- 13.5 km (8.4 mi) south of the confluence of the Pika and Pikauba rivers;
- 11.3 km (7.0 mi) east of rivière aux Écorces.

From the mouth of Pika Lake, the course of the Pika River flows over 20.5 km (12.7 mi) entirely in the forest zone, with a drop of 147 m (482 ft), according to the following segments :

- 2.7 km (1.7 mi) first towards the east, bending towards the northeast crossing Hocquart Lake (length: 2.3 km (1.4 mi); altitude: 555 m (1,821 ft)) to the dike at its mouth;
- 4.7 km (2.9 mi) towards the north, first by forming a loop towards the west, then a hook of 0.8 km (0.50 mi) towards the northeast, up to a stream (coming from the east);
- 1.4 km (0.87 mi) towards the north by forming a small hook towards the west at the end of the segment, up to the south shore of lac Custeau;
- 1.5 km (0.93 mi) towards the north crossing Lake Custeau (altitude: 513 m (1,683 ft)) over its full length and bending towards the east in the bay north of the lake, to its mouth. Note: Lac Custeau receives on the north side the outlet from Lac Scott, Lac de la Niche, Lac Clarence-Gagnon and Lac du Merle;
- 2.0 km (1.2 mi) eastward, bending northwards around a mountain whose summit reaches 619 m (2,031 ft), up to route 169;
- 2.2 km (1.4 mi) towards the north by collecting the Savard stream (coming from the south-east) to the outlet (coming from the west) of Lac Janvry;
- 6.0 km (3.7 mi) towards the north by forming a hook towards the east, then towards the north, until its mouth.

== Toponymy ==
The course of the Pika River crosses route 169 (connecting the town of Quebec (city) and Lac Saint-Jean) a little south of the Gîte-du-Berger. By the end of the 19th century, this forest road was already used, well before the construction of the current road; it was then dotted with relays for travelers traveling on foot on a route called "Chemin du Gouvernement". In 1869, a camp known as Abri Pika was established there.

The name "Pika" is of Innu origin and to which the word "Apica" is attached. This appellation appears on a map of the Laurentides Park in 1942. "Pik" has the meaning of "small", "menu", "delicate" which is well suited to the size of the river.

The toponym "Rivière Pika" was formalized on December 5, 1968, at the Place Names Bank of the Commission de toponymie du Québec.

== See also ==
- Lac-Saint-Jean-Est Regional County Municipality
- Lac-Achouakan, a TNO
- Le Fjord-du-Saguenay Regional County Municipality
- Lac-Ministuk, a TNO
- Hocquart Lake
- Pikauba River
- Kenogami Lake
- Chicoutimi River
- Saguenay River
- St. Lawrence River
- List of rivers of Quebec
