= Rivière aux Canots Est =

- Location within Quebec

Location
- Country: Canada
- Province: Quebec
- Region: Saguenay-Lac-Saint-Jean
- Regional County Municipality: Lac-Saint-Jean-Est Regional County Municipality
- Unorganized territory: Lac-Achouakan and Lac-Moncouche

Physical characteristics
- Source: Lac Bonjour
  - location: Lac-Achouakan
  - coordinates: 47.99514°N 71.45355°W
  - elevation: 669 m (2,195 ft)
- Mouth: Rivière aux Canots
  - location: Lac-Moncouche
  - coordinates: 47.95778°N 71.53833°W
  - elevation: 560 m (1,840 ft)
- Length: 10.2 km (6.3 mi)
- Discharge
  - location: Lac-Moncouche

Basin features
- Tributaries
  - left: (from the mouth) Ruisseau Bergeron, discharge of lac Plutus, ruisseau Gauthier, discharge of lac Chartrain.
  - right: (from the mouth) Discharge of lac des Pâturins.

The Rivière aux Canots Est is a tributary of the Rivière aux Canots, flowing in the unorganized territories of Lac-Achouakan and Lac-Moncouche, the Lac-Saint-Jean-Est Regional County Municipality, in the administrative region of Saguenay–Lac-Saint-Jean, in the province of Quebec, in Canada. The course of the Rivière aux Canots Est crosses the Laurentides Wildlife Reserve.

The valley of the Rivière aux Canots Est is served indirectly by the route 169. This valley is also served by a few secondary forest roads, especially for forestry and recreational tourism activities.

Forestry is the main economic activity in this valley; recreational tourism, second.

The surface of the Rivière aux Canots Est is usually frozen from the beginning of December to the end of March, however the safe circulation on the ice is generally done from mid-December to mid-March.

== Geography ==
The main watersheds neighboring the Rivière aux Canots Est are:

- north side: Suzor-Côté lake, Bousquet lake, Pikauba River, Pika River;
- east side: Gauthier brook, Bergeron brook, Pikauba River, Apica River, Mignault Lake, Leboeuf brook;
- south side: Rivière aux Canots, Lampron Lake, Caché Creek, Jubinville Lake, Caché Lake, Willie Lake, Apica River;
- west side: Rivière aux Canots, Rivière aux Écorces, Lac à la Culotte.

The Rivière aux Canots Est rises at Lac Bonjour (length: 0.9 kilometres (0.56 mi); altitude: 669 metres (2,195 ft)) in a forest area in the Laurentides Wildlife Reserve. This lake is mainly fed by the outlet (coming from the northeast) from Lake Calderly and the outlet (coming from the north) from Lac des Hannetons. This source is located at:

- 1.7 kilometres (1.1 mi) south-west of route 169;
- 2.6 kilometres (1.6 mi) northwest of the summit of mount Apica (altitude: 886 metres (2,907 ft));
- 3.7 kilometres (2.3 mi) south of lac Suzor-Côté;
- 4.7 kilometres (2.9 mi) north-west of the hamlet Mont-Apica;
- 6.7 kilometres (4.2 mi) east of the Pika River;
- 7.6 kilometres (4.7 mi) north-east of the confluence of the east Aux Canots river and the Aux Canots river.

From its source (Bonjour lake), the Rivière aux Canots Est flows over 10.2 kilometres (6.3 mi) with a drop of 109 metres (358 ft) entirely in the forest zone, according to the following segments:

- 1.4 kilometres (0.87 mi) to the south by collecting the discharge (coming from the east), to the Gauthier stream (coming from the east). Note: the first half of this segment is in the marsh area;
- 4.1 kilometres (2.5 mi) to the south in particular by collecting the discharge (coming from the east) from Lake Plutus, by collecting the discharge (coming from the northwest) from Lac des Pâturins and by crossing a lake not identified (length: 0.5 kilometres (0.31 mi); altitude: 639 metres (2,096 ft)) over its full length, up to its mouth. Note: This lake receives the discharge from Bergeron stream on the south side;
- 4.7 kilometres (2.9 mi) towards the south-west, forming a loop towards the south in the marsh area, to its mouth.

The Rivière aux Canots Est flows into the northeast bank of the Rivière aux Canots. This confluence is located at:

- 1.4 kilometres (0.87 mi) north-west of Lac Lampron;
- 2.7 kilometres (1.7 mi) south-east of Lac du Panache;
- 9.3 kilometres (5.8 mi) south-west of route 169;
- 13.3 kilometres (8.3 mi) east of the confluence of Rivière aux Canots and Rivière aux Écorces;
- 36.4 kilometres (22.6 mi) south-east of the confluence of the Pikauba River and the Rivière aux Écorces;
- 41.5 kilometres (25.8 mi) south-east of the confluence of the Pikauba River and Kenogami Lake;
- 62.8 kilometres (39.0 mi) southwest of the confluence of the Chicoutimi River and the Saguenay River in the Chicoutimi sector of the city of Saguenay (city).

From the mouth of the Rivière aux Canots Est, the current successively follows the course of the Rivière aux Canots on 24.1 kilometres (15.0 mi) generally west, the course of the Rivière aux Écorces on 52.8 kilometres (32.8 mi) generally north, the course of the Pikauba River on 10.6 kilometres (6.6 mi) generally north, crosses Kenogami Lake on 17.6 kilometres (10.9 mi) north-east to barrage de Portage-des-Roches, then follows the course of the Chicoutimi River on 26.2 kilometres (16.3 mi) to the east, then the northeast and the course of the Saguenay River on 114.6 kilometres (71.2 mi) east to Tadoussac where it merges with the Saint Lawrence estuary.

== Toponymy ==
The toponym "Rivière aux Canots Est" was formalized on December 5, 1968, at the Bank of Place Names of the Commission de toponymie du Québec.

== Appendices ==
=== Related articles ===
- Lac-Saint-Jean-Est Regional County Municipality
- Lac-Moncouche, a TNO
- Lac-Achouakan, a TNO
- Laurentides Wildlife Reserve
- Rivière aux Canots
- Rivière aux Écorces
- Pikauba River
- Kenogami Lake
- Chicoutimi River
- Saguenay River
- List of rivers of Quebec
