= Ruisseau Contourné =

- Location within Quebec

Location
- Country: Canada
- Province: Quebec
- Region: Saguenay–Lac-Saint-Jean and Capitale-Nationale
- Regional County Municipality: Lac-Saint-Jean-Est Regional County Municipality and La Côte-de-Beaupré Regional County Municipality
- Municipalities: Lac-Moncouche and Lac-Jacques-Cartier

Physical characteristics
- Source: Étoile Lake
  - location: Lac-Moncouche
  - coordinates: 47.95985°N 71.88336°W
  - elevation: 462 m (1,516 ft)
- Mouth: Rivière aux Montagnais
  - location: Lac-Jacques-Cartier
  - coordinates: 47.92258°N 71.91633°W
  - elevation: 4,444 m (14,580 ft)
- Length: 6.1 km (3.8 mi)
- Discharge
  - location: Lac-Jacques-Cartier

Basin features
- Tributaries
  - left: (upward from the mouth) Discharge of lac Louisette and lac Pinsonneault, discharge of lac Dépatie.
  - right: (upward from the mouth) Discharge of lac Delaunais.

The ruisseau Contourné is a tributary of the north shore of the rivière aux Montagnais, flowing near the northern limit in the Laurentides Wildlife Reserve, in the province from Quebec, to Canada. The course crosses:

- MRC Lac-Saint-Jean-Est Regional County Municipality, in administrative region of Saguenay–Lac-Saint-Jean, in the unorganized territory of Lac-Moncouche;
- MRC La Côte-de-Beaupré Regional County Municipality, in administrative region of Capitale-Nationale, in the unorganized territory of Lac-Jacques-Cartier.

Forestry is the main economic activity in this valley; recreational tourism, second.

The surface of Contourné Creek (except the rapids areas) is usually frozen from the end of November to the beginning of April, however the safe circulation on the ice is generally done from mid-December to the end of March.

== Geography ==
The main watersheds adjacent to "Ruisseau Contourné" are:

- north side: Huard Lake, Métabetchouane River, Rivière aux Canots;
- east side: rivière aux Écorces, lac aux Écorces;
- south side: Métabetchouane River, Lac aux Montagnais, Métascouac Lake;
- west side: Métabetchouane River, Métabetchouane Lake.

The ruisseau Contourné rises at Lac Étoile (length: 2.2 kilometres (1.4 mi); altitude: 462 metres (1,516 ft)). This misshapen lake has four bays; its mouth is located at the bottom of the south bay. Star Lake is located 4.1 kilometres (2.5 mi) southeast of Starr Lake. The shape of these two lakes is similar.

From its source (mouth of Magny Lake), the course of Contourné stream descends on 27.4 kilometres (17.0 mi), with a drop of 99 metres (325 ft) according to the following segments:

- 0.8 kilometres (0.50 mi) south, to the outlet (coming from the northeast) of Dépatie Lake;
- 3.4 kilometres (2.1 mi) south, to the outlet (coming from the east) of lakes Louisette and Pinsonneault;
- 1.9 kilometres (1.2 mi) southward to its mouth.

From the confluence of the Contourné stream, the current descends on:

- 9.2 kilometres (5.7 mi) south, then northeast, the course of the rivière aux Montagnais;
- 5.0 kilometres (3.1 mi) to the south, the course of the Moncouche River to its mouth;
- 83.9 kilometres (52.1 mi) northerly the Métabetchouane River to the south shore of lac Saint-Jean;
- 22.8 kilometres (14.2 mi) towards the north-east by crossing lac Saint-Jean;
- 172.3 kilometres (107.1 mi) towards the east by taking the course of the Saguenay River via la Petite Décharge to Tadoussac where it merges with the Saint Lawrence estuary.

== Toponymy ==
The toponym "ruisseau Contourné" was formalized on December 5, 1968, at the Place Names Bank of the Commission de toponymie du Québec.

== See also ==
- Lac-Jacques-Cartier, an unorganized territory
- Lac-Saint-Jean-Est Regional County Municipality
- Lac-Moncouche, an unorganized territory
- La Côte-de-Beaupré Regional County Municipality
- Laurentides Wildlife Reserve
- Rivière aux Montagnais
- Moncouche River
- Métabetchouane River
- Lac Saint-Jean, a body of water
- Saguenay River
- St. Lawrence River
- List of rivers of Quebec
