= Saint-Véran Lake =

Lake in Quebec, Canada

- Location in Quebec
- Location: Lac-Moncouche (TNO), Lac-Saint-Jean-Est Regional County Municipality, Saguenay–Lac-Saint-Jean
- Coordinates: 47.97166°N 71.92944°W
- Lake type: Natural
- Primary inflows: (clockwise from the mouth) Décharge des lacs Martinbeault, Dostaler et Étang Fétide, ruisseau non identifié, décharge du Lac des Polypores, décharge d'un ensemble de lacs dont le Starr Lake, décharge du Lac du Coteau et du Lac Meilleur.
- Primary outflows: Moncouche River (via Moncouche Lake)
- Basin countries: Canada
- Max. length: 2.9 km (1.8 mi)
- Max. width: 0.6 km (0.37 mi)
- Surface elevation: 399 m (1,309 ft)

The Saint-Véran Lake is a fresh body of water in the head area of the Moncouche River (via the Moncouche Lake), in the unorganized territory of Lac-Moncouche, in the Lac-Saint-Jean-Est Regional County Municipality, in the administrative region of Saguenay–Lac-Saint-Jean, in the province of Quebec, in Canada. Lac Saint-Véran is located in the western part of the Laurentides Wildlife Reserve. Its location is almost at the limit of the administrative regions of Saguenay–Lac-Saint-Jean and Capitale-Nationale.

A forest road runs along the southeast shore of Lac Moncouche. A few secondary forest roads serve this area for the needs of forestry and recreational tourism activities.

Forestry is the main economic activity in the sector; recreational tourism, second.

The surface of Lake Saint-Véran is usually frozen from the beginning of December to the end of March, however the safe circulation on the ice is generally made from mid-December to mid-March.

== Geography ==
The main hydrographic slopes near Lake Saint-Véran are:

- North side: Starr Lake, Huard Lake, Métabetchouane River;
- East side: Étoile lake, Contourné stream;
- South side: Moncouche Lake, Contourné stream, rivière aux Montagnais;
- West side: Métabetchouane River.

The lake Saint-Véran is connected (on southwest side) to Moncouche Lake and is landlocked between the mountains. Lac Saint-Véran has a length of 2.9 kilometres (1.8 mi), a width of 0.6 kilometres (0.37 mi), an altitude of 399 metres (1,309 ft). Its mouth located to the southwest is located at:

- 7.0 kilometres (4.3 mi) north-east of the confluence of the Moncouche River and the Métabetchouane river;
- 8.1 kilometres (5.0 mi) north-east of Métabetchouane Lake;
- 16.0 kilometres (9.9 mi) north-east of the Canadian National railway station Kiskissink;
- 26.5 kilometres (16.5 mi) to the east of route 155, connecting La Tuque to Chambord;
- 50.1 kilometres (31.1 mi) south-east of the confluence of the Métabetchouane river and Lac Saint-Jean.

From the mouth of Lac Saint-Véran, the current descends the Moncouche River over 9.3 kilometres (5.8 mi) generally towards the south, the Métabetchouane River generally towards the north over 83.9 kilometres (52.1 mi) to the south shore of lac Saint-Jean; then the current crosses the latter on 22.8 kilometres (14.2 mi) towards the northeast, then follows the course of the Saguenay River via La Petite Décharge on 172.3 kilometres (107.1 mi) to Tadoussac where the current merges with the Estuary of Saint Lawrence.

== Toponymy ==
The toponym "Lac Saint-Véran" was formalized on December 5, 1968, by the Commission de toponymie du Québec.

== See also ==
- Lac-Saint-Jean-Est Regional County Municipality
- Lac-Moncouche, an unorganized territory
- Laurentides Wildlife Reserve
- Moncouche Lake
- Moncouche River
- Métabetchouane River
- Lac Saint-Jean
- Saguenay River
- St. Lawrence River
- List of lakes of Canada
