= Rivière à la Carpe =

- Location within Quebec

Location
- Country: Canada
- Province: Quebec
- Region: Saguenay-Lac-Saint-Jean
- Regional County Municipality: Le Domaine-du-Roy Regional County Municipality and Lac-Saint-Jean-Est Regional County Municipality
- Municipalities: Belle-Rivière and Saint-André-du-Lac-Saint-Jean

Physical characteristics
- Source: Neuf Lake
  - location: Belle-Rivière
  - coordinates: 48.246375°N 71.81354°W
  - elevation: 375 m (1,230 ft)
- Mouth: Métabetchouane River
  - location: Saint-André-du-Lac-Saint-Jean
  - coordinates: 48.29861°N 71.97833°W
  - elevation: 250 m (820 ft)
- Length: 20.2 km (12.6 mi)
- Discharge
  - location: Saint-André-du-Lac-Saint-Jean

Basin features
- Tributaries
  - left: (upward from the mouth) Décharge du Lac à la Carpe, décharge du Lac à la Vache, décharge d'un lac non identifié.
  - right: (upward from the mouth) Décharge d'un lac non identifié, décharge d'un lac non identifié, décharge d'un lac non identifié, ruisseau non identifié, décharge d'un lac non identifié, décharge d'un lac non identifié.

The rivière à la Carpe is a tributary of the eastern shore of the Métabetchouane River, in the administrative region of Saguenay–Lac-Saint-Jean, in the province of Quebec, in Canada. Entirely in a forest zone, the course of this river crosses the unorganized territory of Belle-Rivière, in the Lac-Saint-Jean-Est Regional County Municipality and the municipality of Saint-André-du-Lac-Saint-Jean, in the Le Domaine-du-Roy Regional County Municipality.

Forestry is the main economic activity in this area; recreational tourism, second.

The surface of the "rivière à la Carpe" (except the rapids zones) is usually frozen from the end of November to the beginning of April, however the safe circulation on the ice is generally done from mid-December to the end of March.

== Geography ==
The main watersheds neighboring the "rivière à la Carpe" are:

- north side: Métabetchouane River, l'Abbé River, MacDonald River, Lac Saint-Jean;
- east side: La Belle Rivière, Barnabé stream, Lac de la Belle Rivière, and rivière du Milieu;
- south side: Métabetchouane River and lac à la Carpe;
- west side: Métabetchouane River, Bruyante River and Prudent River.

The Carp River takes its source at the mouth of Lac Neuf (length: 1.4 km (0.87 mi); altitude: 375 m (1,230 ft)). This lake receives two streams which are surrounded by marshes.

From its source, the course of the "rivière à la Carp" descends on 20.2 km (12.6 mi), with a drop in level of 125 m (410 ft), according to these segments:

- 4.4 km (2.7 mi) towards the northwest by collecting two discharges from small unidentified lakes, up to a bend of a river where a stream pours into it;
- 4.0 km (2.5 mi) toward the west it forms very small coils and by collecting the outlet of "Lac à la Vache", until the discharge of Lac à la Carpe
- 7.5 km (4.7 mi) toward the west, it forms small streamers and by collecting two discharges from small unidentified lakes, as well as by crossing three series of rapids, up to a bend in the river;
- 4.3 km (2.7 mi) toward northwest, bending west at the end of the segment and collecting a stream, to its mouth, located on the east bank of the Métabetchouane River.

From the confluence of the Carpe river, the current descends the Métabetchouane River north on 11.9 km (7.4 mi) to the south shore of Lac Saint-Jean; from there, the current crosses the latter on 22.8 km (14.2 mi) towards the northeast, then borrows the course of the Saguenay River via la Petite Landfill on 172.3 km (107.1 mi) until Tadoussac where it merges with the Saint Lawrence estuary.

== Toponymy ==
The toponym "rivière à la Carpe" was formalized on December 5, 1968, at the Place Names Bank of the Commission de toponymie du Québec.

== See also ==
- Belle-Rivière, an unorganized territory
- Saint-André-du-Lac-Saint-Jean, a municipality
- Lac à la Carpe (rivière à la Carpe), a body of water
- Laurentides Wildlife Reserve
- Métabetchouane River
- Lac Saint-Jean, a body of water
- Saguenay River
- St. Lawrence River
- List of rivers of Quebec
