= Apica River =

River in Capitale-Nationale, Canada

- Location within Quebec

Location
- Country: Canada
- Province: Quebec
- Region: Saguenay-Lac-Saint-Jean
- Regional County Municipality: Le Fjord-du-Saguenay Regional County Municipality
- Unorganized territory and a city: Lac-Ministuk

Physical characteristics
- Source: Lac Micoine
  - location: Lac-Ministuk
  - coordinates: 48.32845°N 71.67960°W
  - elevation: 739
- Mouth: Pikauba River
  - location: Lac-Ministuk
  - coordinates: 47.97889°N 71.41028°W
  - elevation: 502 m (1,647 ft)
- Length: 19.5 km (12.1 mi)
- Discharge
  - location: Lac-Ministuk

Basin features
- Tributaries
  - left: (from the mouth) Décharge du lac Molson, décharge du lac Dagenay, décharge du lac du Carnier (via le lac Lemay), décharge du petit lac Micoine (via le lac Micoine).
  - right: (from the mouth) Décharge du lac du Lédon.

The Apica River is a freshwater tributary of the Pikauba River, flowing in the unorganized territory of Lac-Ministuk, in the Le Fjord-du-Saguenay Regional County Municipality, in the administrative region of Saguenay–Lac-Saint-Jean, in the province of Quebec, in Canada.

The Apica River flows through a narrow, steep valley. Visitors can admire the panorama from a rest area located a few kilometers north of the route 169 bridge over it. This river turns out to be the outlet of a series of small aligned lakes, located to the south, Lake Micoine constituting its head. At the end of the route, the Apica river flows at the foot of Apica mountain, culminating at 884 m (2,900 ft). The lake of the same name is located to the southwest of Mount-Apica; however, this lake is integrated into the watershed of the rivière aux Écorces.

The upper part of the Apica valley is accessible by the route 169 (route d'Iberville); other secondary forest roads have been developed in the sector for forestry and recreational tourism activities.

Forestry is the primary economic activity in the sector; recreational tourism, second.

The surface of the Apica River is usually frozen from late November to early April, however safe circulation on the ice is generally from mid-December to late March.

== Geography ==
The Apica River intersects the route 169 connecting Quebec (city) to Lac Saint-Jean, halfway between Jacques-Cartier Lake and the northwest limit of the Laurentides Wildlife Reserve. The main watersheds adjacent to the Apica River are:

- north side: Pikauba River, Félix stream, Damasse stream, Suzor Côté lake, Petite rivière Pikauba;
- east side: Pikauba River, Lac Godin, Petite rivière Pikauba, Cyriac River;
- south side: Mignault Lake, Madeleine Creek, Pikauba River, Rivière aux Écorces North-East;
- west side: Rivière aux Écorces, Lake Paris, Jacqueline Lake.

The Apica River rises at the mouth of Lake Micoine (altitude: 752 km (467 mi)). The mouth which is on the north shore of this head lake is located at:

- 3.6 km (2.2 mi) south-west of a curve in the course of the Pikauba River;
- 3.7 km (2.3 mi) east of the source of the rivière aux Canots;
- 8.4 km (5.2 mi) north-east of rivière aux Écorces North-East;
- 5.4 km (3.4 mi) south-west of route 169;
- 13.4 km (8.3 mi) south-east of the confluence of the Apica river and the Pikauba River;
- 15.4 km (9.6 mi) south-east of the confluence of the rivière aux Canots Est and the Rivière aux Canots.

From the mouth of Lake Micoine, the course of the Apica River flows over 19.5 km (12.1 mi) entirely in the forest zone, with a drop of 237 m (778 ft), according to the following segments :

- 5.5 km (3.4 mi) north-west crossing Mitchell Lake (altitude: 752 m (2,467 ft)) over its full length, up to its mouth. Note: Mitchell Lake is contiguous to Micoine Lake and has a bay extending 2.2 km (1.4 mi) to the southeast on the west shore. A mountain (summit at 857 km (533 mi)) is located on the east side; another mountain located on the peninsula forming the west bank rises to the summit at 836 m (2,743 ft); a third summit located south of Lac Mignault is 884 m (2,900 ft). A breakwater is built at the mouth on the northwest bank;
- 4.5 km (2.8 mi) towards the north-west notably by crossing Lake Lemay (length: 2.3 km (1.4 mi); altitude: 719 m (2,359 ft)) to its mouth. Note: About 90% of the area of this lake constitutes a marsh area;
- 3.3 km (2.1 mi) north-west, to the outlet (coming from the south-west) of Lake Dagenay;
- 0.4 km (0.25 mi) north-west, to the outlet (coming from the south-west) of Molson Lake;
- 0.7 km (0.43 mi) towards the north, meandering, to the outlet (coming from the northeast) of Lac du Lédon;
- 3.8 km (2.4 mi) towards the north by forming a loop towards the east by crossing the zone of the old village of Mont-Apica, until route 169;
- 1.3 km (0.81 mi) north, to its mouth.

The Apica river flows on the west bank of the Pikauba River. This confluence is located at:

- 0.6 km (0.37 mi) north-east of route 169;
- 1.6 km (0.99 mi) north of the village center of Mont-Apica;
- 20.6 km (12.8 mi) north-west of the junction of route 169 and route 175;
- 38.6 km (24.0 mi) south-east of the confluence of the Pikauba River and Kenogami Lake;
- 56.0 km (34.8 mi) south-west of the confluence of the Chicoutimi River and the Saguenay River;
- 61.0 km (37.9 mi) south-east of the shore of lac Saint-Jean.

From the confluence of the Apica river with the Pikauba River, the current descends successively the Pikauba river on 61.6 km (38.3 mi) to the northeast, then the current crosses the Kenogami Lake on 17.6 km (10.9 mi) north-east to Barrage de Portage-des-Roches, then follows the course of the Chicoutimi River on 26.2 km (16.3 mi) to the east, then the northeast, and the course of the Saguenay River on 114.6 km (71.2 mi) east to Tadoussac where it merges with the Saint Lawrence estuary.

== Toponymy ==
The Dictionary of Rivers and Lakes of the Province of Quebec (1914 and 1925) calls this stream "Upika River". The toponymic designation of this river appears under the spelling "Upica" on the map of the province of Quebec by Eugène Taché (1870), in Studies by Stanislas Drapeau on the developments of the colonization of Lower Canada (1863), and in an 1850 report from the Commissioner of Crown Lands, JH Price, with the spelling "Upika". The Innu term "upica" means "it is constricted" when speaking of a watercourse. This term could also mean "carrying strap", according to an interpretation known formerly. Long used, the name "Upica" was changed in 1961 to "Apica" as was the new designation "Mount Apica". This mountain then acquired a certain notoriety following the installation, nearby, of a radar station, today disused.

The toponym "Apica river" was formalized on June 6, 1973, at the Place Names Bank of the Commission de toponymie du Québec.

=== See also ===
- Le Fjord-du-Saguenay Regional County Municipality
- Lac-Ministuk, a TNO
- Pikauba River
- Kenogami Lake
- Chicoutimi River
- Saguenay River
- St. Lawrence River
- List of rivers of Quebec
