= Mitchell Lake (Apica River) =

Lake in Quebec, Canada

- Location in Quebec
- Location: Lac-Jacques-Cartier
- Coordinates: 47.86805°N 71.39861°W
- Lake type: Natural
- Primary inflows: (from the mouth) Ruisseaux riverains, décharge (venant du sud-est) du lac Micoine et décharge (venant du sud) des lacs des Groseillers et de la Fourmillière.
- Primary outflows: Apica River
- Basin countries: Canada
- Max. length: 5.5 km (3.4 mi)
- Max. width: 0.5 km (0.31 mi)
- Surface elevation: 752 m (2,467 ft)

Lac Mitchell is a freshwater body from the watershed of the Apica River, the Pikauba River and Saguenay River, in the unorganized territory of Lac-Jacques-Cartier, in the La Côte-de-Beaupré Regional County Municipality, in the administrative region of Capitale-Nationale, in the province of Quebec, in Canada.

Recreational and tourist activities, especially vacationing, are the main economic activities in this area; agriculture and forestry, second.

The surface of Lake Mitchell is usually frozen from the beginning of December to the end of March, however the safe circulation on the ice is generally done from mid-December to mid-March.

== Geography ==
The main watersheds adjacent to Lake Mitchell are:

- north side: Apica River, Pikauba River;
- east side: Côté stream, Leboeuf stream, Pikauba River, Croche stream, Talbot Lake;
- south side: Mignault Lake, Madeleine Creek, Rivière aux Écorces North-East;
- west side: rivière aux Canots, Lac Oligny, Lac Jubinville, Willie Creek.

Lake Mitchell is5.5 km (3.4 mi) long, 0.5 km (0.31 mi) wide and 752 m (2,467 ft) elevated. This lake is mainly fed by riparian streams, by the outlet (coming from the south-east) from Lake Micoine and by the outlet (coming from the south) from the lakes of Groseillers and La Fourmillière. This lake has an appendix of 0.9 km (0.56 mi) stretching towards the south, forming a peninsula extending towards the north, which comprises a mountain whose summit reaches 835 m (2,740 ft). The mouth of Lake Mitchell is located to the northwest, at:

- 1.1 km (0.68 mi) northeast of Lac Oligny;
- 2.0 km (1.2 mi) southeast of Lac Lemay;
- 4.3 km (2.7 mi) south-west of route 169;
- 7.6 km (4.7 mi) north of the course of the Rivière aux Écorces North-East;
- 9.7 km (6.0 mi) south-east of the center of the village of Mont-Apica;
- 11.3 km (7.0 mi) south-east of the confluence of the Apica River and the Pikauba River;
- 49.8 km (30.9 mi) south-east of the confluence of the Pikauba River and Kenogami Lake.

From the mouth of Lake Mitchell, the current follows the course of the Apica River on 14.0 km (8.7 mi) consecutively, the course of the Pikauba River on 61.6 km (38.3 mi) generally towards the north, crosses Kenogami Lake on 17.6 km (10.9 mi) towards the northeast until Barrage de Portage-des-Roches, then follows the course of the Chicoutimi River on 26.2 km (16.3 mi) to the east, then the northeast and the course of the Saguenay River on 114.6 km (71.2 mi) east to Tadoussac where it merges with the Saint Lawrence estuary.

== Toponymy ==
The term "Mitchell" is a family name of English origin.

The toponym "Lac Mitchell" was formalized on December 5, 1968, by the Commission de toponymie du Québec.

== See also ==
- List of lakes in Canada
