= MacDonald River (Métabetchouane River tributary) =

River in Canada

- Location within Quebec

Location
- Country: Canada
- Province: Quebec
- Region: Saguenay-Lac-Saint-Jean
- Regional County Municipality: Lac-Saint-Jean-Est Regional County Municipality
- Municipalities: Métabetchouan–Lac-à-la-Croix and Desbiens

Physical characteristics
- Source: Confluence of two agricultural and forestry streams
  - location: Métabetchouan–Lac-à-la-Croix
  - coordinates: 48°23′05″N 71°53′24″W
  - elevation: 170 m (560 ft)
- Mouth: Métabetchouane River
  - location: Desbiens
  - coordinates: 48°24′57″N 71°57′31″W
  - elevation: 101 m (331 ft)
- Length: 8.0 km (5.0 mi)
- Discharge
  - location: Desbiens

The MacDonald River is a tributary of the east bank of the Métabetchouane River, flowing in the municipalities of Métabetchouan–Lac-à-la-Croix and Desbiens, in the Lac-Saint-Jean-Est Regional County Municipality, in the administrative region of Saguenay–Lac-Saint-Jean, in the province, in Quebec, Canada.

Agriculture is the main economic activity in this area; recreational tourism, second.

The surface of the MacDonald River (except the rapids) is usually frozen from late November to early April, however safe circulation on the ice is generally from mid-December to late March.

== Geography ==
The main watersheds adjacent to the MacDonald River are:

- north side: lac Saint-Jean;
- east side: Couchepaganiche River, la Belle Rivière;
- south side: the Métabetchouane River, L'Abbé River, rivière à la Carpe;
- west side: Métabetchouane River.

The MacDonald River originates at the confluence of two agricultural and forestry streams, located west of Chemin du 4e rang de Métabetchouan–Lac-à-la-Croix.

From its source, the course of the MacDonald River descends on 8.0 km (5.0 mi), with a drop of 69 m (226 ft), according to the following segments:

- 4.1 km (2.5 mi) first towards the north-west, then towards the west, up to a stream (coming from the south);
- 3.9 km (2.4 mi) westwards passing south of the village of Quebec, to its mouth, located on the east bank of Métabetchouane harbor which is crossed northward by the Métabetchouane River.

From the confluence of the MacDonald River, the current crosses 0.8 km (0.50 mi) northwest to Métabetchouane harbor, to the south shore of lac Saint-Jean; from there, the current crosses the latter on 22.8 km (14.2 mi) towards the northeast, then borrows the course of the Saguenay River via la Petite Décharge on 172.3 km (107.1 mi) until Tadoussac where it merges with the Saint Lawrence estuary.

== Toponymy ==
The toponym "MacDonald River" was formalized on December 5, 1968, at the Place Names Bank of the Commission de toponymie du Québec.

== Appendices ==
=== Related articles ===
- Lac-Saint-Jean-Est Regional County Municipality
- Métabetchouan–Lac-à-la-Croix, a municipality
- Desbiens, a municipality
- Métabetchouane River
- Lac Saint-Jean, a body of water
- Saguenay River
- St. Lawrence River
- List of rivers of Quebec
