= Moncouche River =

- Location within Quebec

Location
- Country: Canada
- Province: Quebec
- Region: Saguenay-Lac-Saint-Jean
- Regional County Municipality: Le Domaine-du-Roy Regional County Municipality and Lac-Saint-Jean-Est Regional County Municipality
- Municipalities: Belle-Rivière and Saint-André-du-Lac-Saint-Jean

Physical characteristics
- Source: Starr Lake
  - location: Belle-Rivière
  - coordinates: 47.99951°N 71.91031°W
  - elevation: 477 m (1,565 ft)
- Mouth: Métabetchouane River
  - location: Lac-Jacques-Cartier
  - coordinates: 47.91972°N 72.005°W
  - elevation: 397 m (1,302 ft)
- Length: 14.7 km (9.1 mi)
- Discharge
  - location: Lac-Jacques-Cartier

Basin features
- Tributaries
  - left: (upward from the mouth) Décharge du lac des Agrions, rivière aux Montagnais, décharge du lac Constantineau, décharge des lacs Fourchets, Étel, Vulcain et du Daguet, décharge du lac Purpurin.
  - right: (upward from the mouth) Décharge d'un lac non identifié, décharge de trois lacs non identifiés, décharge du Petit lac Moncouche (via le Moncouche Lake), décharge des lacs Maggis et Martinbeault (via Saint-Véran Lake), décharge du lac des Polypores (via le Saint-Véran Lake).

The Moncouche River (French: rivière Moncouche) is a tributary of the east bank of the Métabetchouane River, crossing the Laurentides Wildlife Reserve, flowing in the province from Quebec, to Canada. The course of this river crosses the:

- unorganized territory of Belle-Rivière, in the Lac-Saint-Jean-Est Regional County Municipality, in the administrative region of Saguenay–Lac-Saint-Jean;
- unorganized territory of Lac-Jacques-Cartier, in the MRC of La Côte-de-Beaupré Regional County Municipality, in the administrative region of Capitale-Nationale.

Forestry is the main economic activity in this valley; recreational tourism, second.

The surface of the Moncouche River (except the rapids zones) is usually frozen from the end of November to the beginning of April, however the safe circulation on the ice is generally done from mid-December to the end of March.

== Geography ==
The main watersheds near the Moncouche river are:

- north side: Métabetchouane River, Huard lake and rivière à la Carpe;
- east side: rivière aux Écorces, rivière aux Montagnais, ruisseau Contourné;
- south side: Métabetchouane River;
- west side: Métabetchouane River, Métabetchouane Lake.

The Moncouche River rises at the mouth of Starr Lake (length: 3.3 kilometres (2.1 mi); altitude: 477 metres (1,565 ft)). This misshapen lake looks like a big X or a star; it has two large bays to the north, two in the center and two to the south.

From its source (mouth of Lake Starr), the course of the Moncouche River descends on 14.7 kilometres (9.1 mi) with a drop of 80 metres (260 ft), according these segments:

- 2.5 kilometres (1.6 mi) southward, to the northeast shore of Saint-Véran Lake;
- 2.9 kilometres (1.8 mi) to the southwest crossing Saint-Véran (altitude: 399 metres (1,309 ft)) over its full length;
- 3.3 kilometres (2.1 mi) to the southwest crossing Moncouche Lake (altitude: 399 metres (1,309 ft)) over its full length. Note: Saint-Véran Lake and Moncouche Lake are interconnected, thus providing 6.2 kilometres (3.9 mi) for pleasure boating.
- 1.0 kilometre (0.62 mi) to the south, until the confluence of the rivière aux Montagnais (coming from the east);
- 5.0 kilometres (3.1 mi) to the southwest, in particular by bypassing an island and crossing Lake Méandre, until it meets the Métabetchouane River.

From the confluence of the Moncouche river, the current descends the Métabetchouane River northward on 83.9 kilometres (52.1 mi) to the south shore of lac Saint-Jean; thence, the current crosses the latter on 22.8 kilometres (14.2 mi) towards the northeast, then follows the course of the Saguenay River via La Petite Décharge on 172.3 kilometres (107.1 mi) to Tadoussac where it merges with the Saint Lawrence estuary.

== Toponymy ==
The toponym "rivière Moncouche" was formalized on December 5, 1968, at the Place Names Bank of the Commission de toponymie du Québec.

== See also ==
- Belle-Rivière, an unorganized territory.
- Lac-Saint-Jean-Est Regional County Municipality
- Lac-Jacques-Cartier, an unorganized territory.
- La Côte-de-Beaupré Regional County Municipality
- Laurentides Wildlife Reserve
- Rivière aux Montagnais
- Métabetchouane River
- Lac Saint-Jean, a body of water
- Saguenay River
- St. Lawrence River
- List of rivers of Quebec
