= Moncouche Lake (Lac-Saint-Jean-Est) =

Lake in Lac-Moncouche, Quebec, Canada

- Location in Quebec
- Location: Lac-Moncouche (TNO), Lac-Saint-Jean-Est Regional County Municipality, Saguenay–Lac-Saint-Jean
- Coordinates: 47.95778°N 71.95722°W
- Lake type: Natural
- Primary inflows: (clockwise from the mouth) Discharge of Lac Saint-Véran and discharge of lac Constantineau.
- Primary outflows: Moncouche River
- Basin countries: Canada
- Max. length: 3.4 km (2.1 mi)
- Max. width: 1.0 km (0.62 mi)
- Surface elevation: 399 m (1,309 ft)

The Moncouche Lake is a freshwater body at the head of the Moncouche River, in the unorganized territory of Lac-Moncouche, in the Lac-Saint-Jean-Est Regional County Municipality, in the administrative region of Saguenay–Lac-Saint-Jean, in province of Quebec, in Canada. Moncouche Lake is located in the western part of the Laurentides Wildlife Reserve. Its location is almost at the limit of the administrative regions of Saguenay–Lac-Saint-Jean and Capitale-Nationale.

A forest road runs along the southeast shore of Moncouche Lake. Some secondary forest roads serve this area for forestry and recreational tourism activities.

Forestry is the main economic activity in the sector; recreational tourism, second.

The surface of lake Moncouche is usually frozen from the beginning of December to the end of March, however the safe circulation on the ice is generally made from mid-December to mid-March.

== Geography ==
The main hydrographic slopes near Lake Moncouche are:

- North side: Saint-Véran Lake, Starr Lake, Huard Lake, Métabetchouane River;
- East side: Étoile lake, Contourné stream;
- South side: Contourné stream, rivière aux Montagnais;
- West side: Métabetchouane River.

Lac Moncouche comprises is connected (southwest side) to Saint-Véran Lake and is landlocked between the mountains. Lac Moncouche has a length of 3.1 kilometres (1.9 mi), a width of 0.9 kilometres (0.56 mi), an altitude of 399 metres (1,309 ft). The Moncouche River (coming from Saint-Véran Lake) crosses this lake for 2.9 kilometres (1.8 mi) to the southwest. The mouth of the lake is located to the southwest and is located at:

- 3.9 kilometres (2.4 mi) north-east of the confluence of the Moncouche River and the Métabetchouane River;
- 5.0 kilometres (3.1 mi) northeast of Métabetchouane Lake;
- 13.1 kilometres (8.1 mi) north-east of the Canadian National Kiskissink station;
- 25 kilometres (16 mi) to the east of route 155, connecting La Tuque to Chambord;
- 52.6 kilometres (32.7 mi) south-east of the confluence of the Métabetchouane River and Lac Saint-Jean.

From the mouth of Lake Moncouche, the current successively descends the Moncouche River over 6.0 kilometres (3.7 mi) generally towards the south; the Métabetchouane River generally north on 83.9 kilometres (52.1 mi) to the south shore of Lac Saint-Jean; the current crosses the latter on 22.8 kilometres (14.2 mi) towards the northeast, then follows the course of the Saguenay River via la Petite Décharge on 172.3 kilometres (107.1 mi) to Tadoussac where the current merges with the Estuary of Saint Lawrence.

== Toponymy ==
The toponym Lac Moncouche was formalized on December 5, 1968, by the Commission de toponymie du Québec.

== See also ==
- Lac-Saint-Jean-Est Regional County Municipality
- Lac-Moncouche, a TNO
- Laurentides Wildlife Reserve
- Rivière aux Montagnais
- Moncouche River
- Métabetchouane River
- Lac Saint-Jean
- Saguenay River
- St. Lawrence River
- List of lakes of Canada
