= Lac à la Carpe =

Lake in Belle-Rivière, Quebec, Canada

- Location in Quebec
- Location: Belle-Rivière
- Coordinates: 48.21944°N 71.86222°W
- Lake type: Natural
- Primary inflows: (clockwise from the mouth) Décharge du lac Larouche, décharge du lac au Canard.
- Primary outflows: discharge going to rivière à la Carpe
- Basin countries: Canada
- Max. length: 8.3 km (5.2 mi)
- Max. width: 2.0 km (1.2 mi)
- Surface elevation: 359 m (1,178 ft)

The lac à la Carpe (English: Carp Lake) is the most important freshwater body on the hydrographic side of the rivière à la Carpe on the watershed Lac Saint-Jean, in the unorganized territory of Belle-Rivière, in the Lac-Saint-Jean-Est Regional County Municipality, in the administrative region of Saguenay–Lac-Saint-Jean, in the province of Quebec, in Canada.

Lac à la Carpe is located a few kilometers from the northern limit of the Laurentides Wildlife Reserve.

This small valley is served by the forest road along the east bank of the Métabetchouane River. A few secondary roads serve this area for the needs of forestry, recreational tourism activities.

Forestry is the main economic activity in the sector; recreational tourism, second.

The surface of Carp Lake is usually frozen from the beginning of December to the end of March, however the safe circulation on the ice is generally done from mid-December to mid-March.

== Geography ==
The main watersheds neighboring Lac à la Carpe are:

- north side: rivière à la Carpe, Lac Saint-Jean;
- east side: lac de la Belle Rivière, La Belle Rivière, Grand lac des Cèdres, rivière du Milieu;
- south side: Métabetchouane River, rivière aux Canots, Huard Lake;
- west side: Métabetchouane River, petit lac à la Carpe.

The "Lac à la Carpe" has a length of 8.3 kilometres (5.2 mi), a width of 2.0 kilometres (1.2 mi) and an altitude of 359 metres (1,178 ft). This lake includes a peninsula advancing towards the northwest, creating a bay at the mouth of the outlet of "Lac au Canard".

The "Lac à la Carpe" is mainly fed by the discharge (coming from the southeast) of Lac au Canard and Lac Madore, as well as by the discharge of Lac Larouche. The mouth of this lake is located to the northwest, at the bottom of a small bay, at:

- 2.0 kilometres (1.2 mi) north-east of the course of the Métabetchouane River;
- 3.0 kilometres (1.9 mi) south-east of the confluence of the outlet of the lake and the rivière à la Carpe;
- 7.3 kilometres (4.5 mi) south-west of a bay on lac de la Belle Rivière;
- 20.0 kilometres (12.4 mi) south-east of lac Saint-Jean.

From the mouth of "Lac à la Carpe", the current flows in the following segments:

- 3.6 kilometres (2.2 mi) towards the north following the discharge until its confluence with the rivière à la Carpe;
- 11.8 kilometres (7.3 mi) westward down the rivière à la Carpe;
- 19.1 kilometres (11.9 mi) northwards following the current of the Métabetchouane River, to the south shore of lac Saint-Jean;
- 22.8 kilometres (14.2 mi) towards the north-east by crossing lac Saint-Jean;
- 172.3 kilometres (107.1 mi) towards the east by following the course of the Saguenay River via La Petite Décharge on 172.3 kilometres (107.1 mi) to Tadoussac where it merges with the Saint Lawrence estuary.

== Toponymy ==
The toponym "lac à la Carpe" was formalized on December 5, 1968, by the Commission de toponymie du Québec.

== See also ==
- Lac-Saint-Jean-Est Regional County Municipality
- Belle-Rivière, a TNO
- Rivière à la Carpe
- Métabetchouane River
- Saguenay River
- Lac Saint-Jean
- List of lakes of Canada
