= Hocquart Lake =

Lake in Quebec, Canada

- Location in Quebec
- Location: Lac-Achouakan
- Coordinates: 48.01278°N 71.55083°W
- Lake type: Natural
- Primary inflows: Pika River, ruisseau Gobeil et par la décharge du lac Larivière.
- Primary outflows: Pika River
- Basin countries: Canada
- Max. length: 2.3 km (1.4 mi)
- Max. width: 0.6 km (0.37 mi)
- Surface elevation: 555 m (1,821 ft)

The lac Hocquart is a freshwater body crossed by the Pika River on the watershed of the Pikauba River and the Saguenay River. Lac Hocquart is located in the unorganized territory of Lac-Achouakan, in the Lac-Saint-Jean-Est Regional County Municipality, in the administrative region of the Saguenay-Lac-Saint-Jean, in the province of Quebec, in Canada. This lake is located in the Laurentides Wildlife Reserve.

This small valley is served indirectly by the route 169 and a few secondary routes for forestry, recreational tourism activities.

Forestry is the main economic activity in the sector; recreotourism activities, in second.

The surface of Lake Hocquart is usually frozen from the beginning of December to the end of March, but safe circulation on the ice is generally made from mid-December to mid-March.

== Geography ==
The main watersheds near Lake Hocquart are:

- north side: Pika Lake, Pika River, Custeau Lake, Scott Lake, Clarence-Gagnon Lake, Pikauba River;
- east side: Gobeil stream, Gobeil lake, rivière aux Canots Est;
- south side: Lac Larivière, Lac du Panache, rivière aux Canots;
- west side: Pika lake, Neptune Lake, Pluto Lake, Cadieux Lake, Audubon Lake, Raquette Creek, Écluse Creek, Sancto Creek, Rivière aux Écorces.

Hocquart Lake is 2.3 km (1.4 mi) in the shape of a pallet hat, a width of 0.6 km (0.37 mi) and an altitude of 555 m (1,821 ft).

This lake is mainly fed by the Pika River (coming from the west), by the Gobeil stream (coming from the east) and by the outlet (coming from the south) of Lac Larivière. The mouth of this lake is located at:

- 1.9 km (1.2 mi) north-east of Pika Lake;
- 2.7 km (1.7 mi) north of Lac du Panache (slope of the Rivière aux Canots);
- 5.3 km (3.3 mi) southeast of Lac Morin;
- 6.6 km (4.1 mi) north-west of the confluence of the Rivière aux Canots and Rivière aux Canots Est;
- 6.2 km (3.9 mi) southwest of route 169;
- 6.8 km (4.2 mi) south of the confluence of the Hocquart river and the Pikauba River;
- 12.7 km (7.9 mi) east of the Rivière aux Écorces.

From the mouth of Lake Hocquart, the current follows the course of the Pika River consecutively on 17.8 km (11.1 mi) to the north, the course of the Pikauba River on 35.0 m (114.8 ft) north to the confluence with Kenogami Lake; it crosses this lake on 17.6 km (10.9 mi) north-east to Barrage de Portage-des-Roches; the course of the Chicoutimi River on 26.2 km (16.3 mi) to the east, then the northeast and the course of the Saguenay River on 114.6 km (71.2 mi) east to Tadoussac where it merges with the Saint Lawrence estuary.

== Toponymy ==
This toponym evokes the life work of Gilles Hocquart (1694-1783), born in Mortagne-au-Perche (France). After having been controller of the port of Rochefort, he came in 1729 to settle in Quebec (city), as authorizing commissioner and interim intendant of New France, in order to replace Claude -Thomas Dupuy; he was confirmed in his functions in 1731. In about twenty years, Gilles Hocquart advanced settlement and agriculture, notably by granting seigneuries in the region of lac Champlain and in Nouvelle-Beauce. He ensured the completion of chemin du Roi, on the left bank of St. Lawrence River, in addition to encouraging shipbuilding, export development, industrial production at Forges du Saint-Maurice, while maintaining a fairly good balance in public finances. Returning to France in 1748, he was first, until 1763, steward of the port of Brest and, as such, he remained in contact with the colony by helping several Acadians deported to establishing themselves in France and ensuring the fitting out of ships bound for Quebec (city) during the Seven Years' War. Gilles Hocquart was appointed State Councilor in 1764 and, until his death, he was entrusted with the stewardship of the Navy classes.

One of his main achievements was the construction of a depot at the Intendant's palace in Quebec (city), where all of the colony's timed registers and documents are stored. Despite the refusal of the king of France, Gilles Hocquart arranged for this place to keep the official documents of the colony in a safe place. Several historians of French Canada emphasize that his stubbornness in front of the king would have made it possible to preserve a substantial part of the archives written in the XVIIth and XVIIIth centuries.

The toponym "Lac Hocquart" was formalized on December 5, 1968, by the Commission de toponymie du Québec.

== Appendices ==
=== Related articles ===
- Lac-Saint-Jean-Est Regional County Municipality
- Lac-Achouakan, a TNO
- Saguenay River
- Chicoutimi River
- Kenogami Lake
- Pikauba River
- Pika River
- Gilles Hocquart
- List of lakes in Canada
