= Through colour render =

Through colour render is a sand/cement/lime based render that is made from White Portland cement (WOPC) and added pigment to produce a coloured effect that is throughout the body of the material. The pigment is preblended into the product as part of the manufacturing process to produce a prebagged product. Another name for these types of materials is monocouche renders.

Various mix designs can be produced in renders according to the published Code of Practice for External Renderings, BS5262 1991. The through colour render market within Europe produces a class 3 mix design as per the Code of Practice by the manufacturing companies listed below;
