= Hocquart =

Hocquart may refer to:

- Gilles Hocquart (1694–1783), Intendant of New France from 1731 to 1748
- Hocquart Lake, a body of water in Quebec, Canada
- Prix Hocquart, a horse race
