= Starr Lake =

Starr Lake may refer to:

- Starr Lake (McMurdo Station), a small meltwater lake which is a source of water for McMurdo Station on Ross Island, Antarctica
- Starr Lake (Lac-Saint-Jean-Est), a freshwater body in the head area of the Moncouche River in Quebec, Canada
