= L'Abbé River (Métabetchouane River tributary) =

Tributary of the Métabetchouane River

- Location within Quebec

Location
- Country: Canada
- Province: Quebec
- Region: Saguenay-Lac-Saint-Jean
- Regional County Municipality: Le Domaine-du-Roy Regional County Municipality
- Municipalities: Saint-André-du-Lac-Saint-Jean and Chambord

Physical characteristics
- Source: L'Abbé Lake
  - location: Saint-André-du-Lac-Saint-Jean
  - coordinates: 48.33240°N 71.95868°W
  - elevation: 259 m (850 ft)
- Mouth: Métabetchouane River
  - location: Chambord
  - coordinates: 48.37555°N 71.98805°W
  - elevation: 198 m (650 ft)
- Length: 6.4 km (4.0 mi)
- Discharge
  - location: Chambord

The L'Abbé river is a tributary of the east bank of the Métabetchouane River, flowing in the municipalities of Saint-André-du-Lac-Saint-Jean and Chambord, in the Le Domaine-du-Roy Regional County Municipality, in the administrative region of Saguenay–Lac-Saint-Jean, in the province of Quebec, in Canada.

Forestry is the main economic activity in this area; recreational tourism, second.

The surface of the L'Abbé River (except the rapids zones) is usually frozen from the end of November to the beginning of April, however the safe circulation on the ice is generally done from mid-December to the end of March.

== Geography ==
The main watersheds adjacent to the L'Abbé River are:

- North side: Métabetchouane River, MacDonald River, Lac Saint-Jean;
- East side: la Belle Rivière, Couchepaganiche River;
- South side: Métabetchouane River, rivière à la Carpe;
- West side: Métabetchouane River, Grande rivière Désir, Bruyante River, Prudent River.

The L'Abbé River rises at the mouth of Lac L'Abbé (length:1.1 km (0.68 mi); altitude: 259 m (850 ft)). This lake, entirely surrounded by forest, has a marsh area near the mouth.

From its source, the course of the L'Abbé river descends on 6.4 km (4.0 mi), with a drop in level of 61 m (200 ft). The first segment is 0.7 km (0.43 mi) in length and flows north to a stream. Then, it flows over a length of 5.7 km (3.5 mi) towards the northwest, to its mouth, located on the east bank of the Métabetchouane River in the middle of a rapid zone, facing an island and 0.4 km (0.25 mi) upstream of the mouth of the Grande Désir river.

From the confluence of the L'Abbé river, the current descends the Métabetchouane River to the north on 8.9 km (5.5 mi) crossing Martine Falls, to the south shore of Lac Saint-Jean; from there, the current crosses the latter on 22.8 km (14.2 mi) towards the northeast, then borrows the course of the Saguenay River via la Petite Décharge on 172.3 km (107.1 mi) until Tadoussac where it merges with the Saint Lawrence estuary.

== Toponymy ==
The toponym Rivière L'Abbé was formalized on December 5, 1968, at the Place Names Bank of the Commission de toponymie du Québec.

== See also ==
=== Related articles ===
- Saint-André-du-Lac-Saint-Jean, a municipality
- Chambord, a municipality
- Métabetchouane River
- Lac Saint-Jean, a body of water
- List of rivers of Quebec
