= Quebec Route 373 =

Highway in Quebec, Canada

Route 373

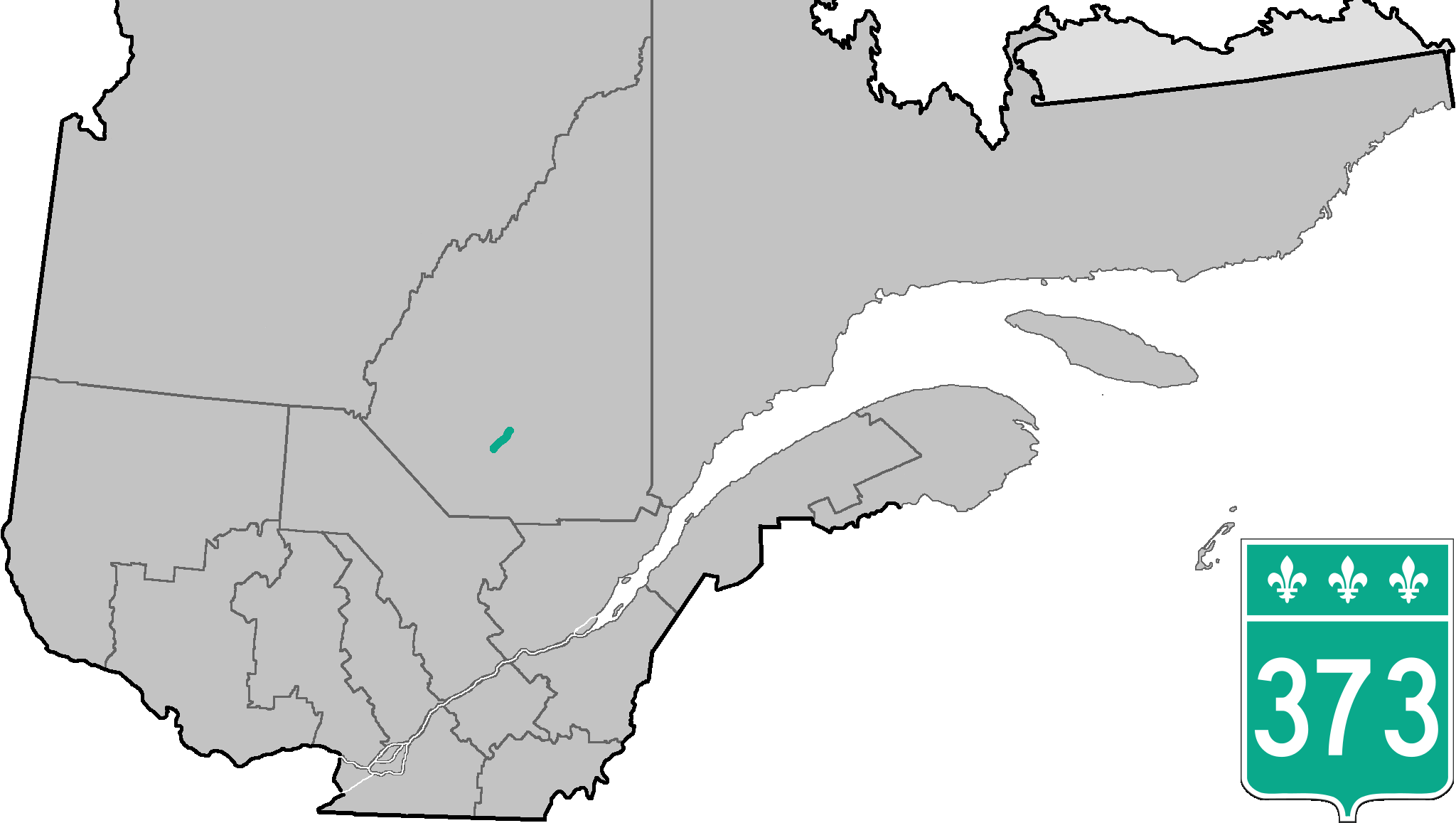

Route information
- Maintained by Transports Québec
- Length: 23 km (14 mi)

Major junctions
- South end: R-169 in Saint-Felicien
- North end: R-169 in Dolbeau-Mistassini

Location
- Country: Canada
- Province: Quebec
- Major cities: Dolbeau-Mistassini, Saint-Félicien

Highway system
- Quebec provincial highways; Autoroutes; List; Former
← R-372	→ R-381

Route 373 is a provincial highway located in the Saguenay–Lac-Saint-Jean region in central Quebec. The 23 km (14 mi) highway stretches from just northeast of Saint-Félicien to Dolbeau-Mistassini with both ends at junctions of Route 169. It also runs through most of the length along Lac Saint-Jean.

== Towns located along Route 373 ==
- Dolbeau-Mistassini
- Saint-Félicien

== Major intersections ==
RCM	Location	km	mi	Destinations	Notes
Le Domaine-du-Roy	Saint-Félicien	0	0.0	R-169 – Roberval, Normandin	Southern terminus
Maria-Chapdelaine	Dolbeau-Mistassini	14.3	8.9	R-169 (8th Avenue) – Alma, Normandin	Northern terminus
1.000 mi = 1.609 km; 1.000 km = 0.621 mi

== See also ==
- List of Quebec provincial highways
