= Labrecque, Quebec =

Labrecque
- Municipality
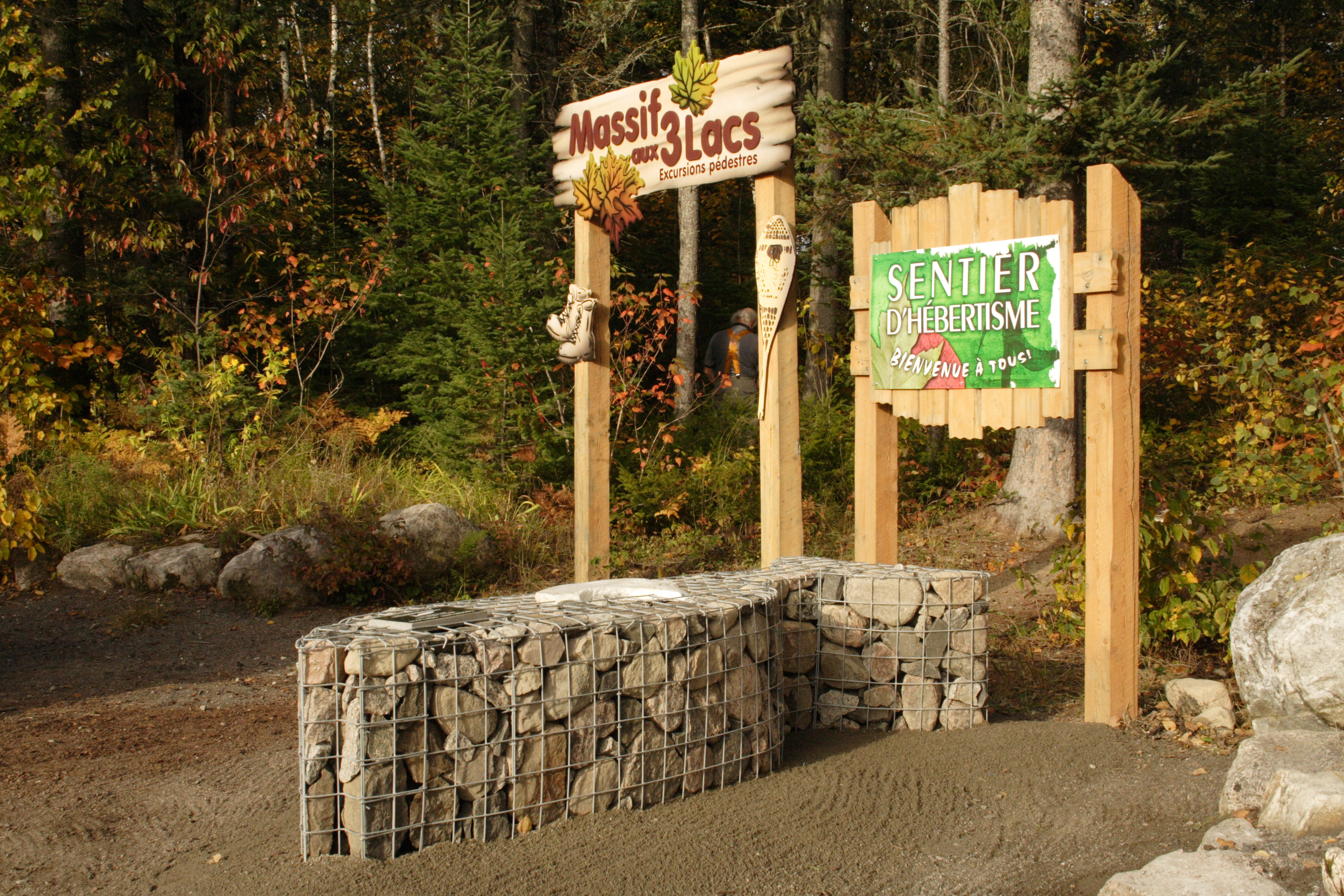

- Location in Saguenay–Lac-Saint-Jean Quebec.
- Coordinates: 48°40′N 71°32′W
- Country: Canada
- Province: Quebec
- Region: Saguenay–Lac-Saint-Jean
- RCM: Lac-Saint-Jean-Est
- Settled: 1917
- Constituted: October 6, 1925

Government
  - Mayor: Marie-Josée Larouche
  - Federal riding: Jonquière—Hébertville—Pays-des-Bleuets
  - Prov. riding: Lac-Saint-Jean

Area
  - Total: 157.30 km^{2} (60.73 sq mi)
  - Land: 152.67 km^{2} (58.95 sq mi)

Population (2021)
  - Total: 1,328
  - Density: 8.7/km^{2} (23/sq mi)
  - Pop 2016-2021: ▲0.5%
  - Dwellings: 766
- Time zone: UTC−5 (EST)
  - Summer (DST): UTC−4 (EDT)
- Postal code(s): G0W 2S0
- Area codes: 418 and 581
- Highways: No major routes
- Website: www.ville.labrecque.qc.ca

Labrecque (French pronunciation: [labʁɛk]) is a municipality in Quebec, Canada.

== History ==
The first settlers to Labrecque arrived in 1917. In 1920, the Labrecque Township was proclaimed, and in 1925 the municipality was incorporated, both named after Michel-Thomas Labrecque (1849-1932), who was the third bishop of Chicoutimi from 1892 to 1928. The first mayor was Jean-Batiste Maltais. The first industry, a sawmill, came into operation in 1921, and the post office opened in 1923.

== Demographics ==
Population trend:

- Population in 2021: 1,328 (2016 to 2021 population change: 0.5%)
- Population in 2016: 1,321
- Population in 2011: 1,215
- Population in 2006: 1,295
- Population in 2001: 1,288
- Population in 1996: 1,224
- Population in 1991: 1,179
- Population in 1986: 1,219
- Population in 1981: 1,152
- Population in 1976: 1,050
- Population in 1971: 1,014
- Population in 1966: 1,184
- Population in 1961: 1,320
- Population in 1956: 1,319
- Population in 1951: 1,297
- Population in 1941: 1,218
- Population in 1931: 700

Private dwellings occupied by usual residents: 575 (total dwellings: 766)

Mother tongue:

- English as first language: 0%
- French as first language: 100%
- English and French as first language: 0%
- Other as first language: 0.4%

== See also ==
- List of municipalities in Quebec
