= Rivière aux Canots (rivière aux Écorces) =

- Location within Quebec

Location
- Country: Canada
- Province: Quebec
- Region: Saguenay-Lac-Saint-Jean
- Regional County Municipality: Le Fjord-du-Saguenay Regional County Municipality
- Unorganized territory: Lac-Jacques-Cartier and Lac-Moncouche

Physical characteristics
- Source: Lac Fleuret
  - location: Lac-Jacques-Cartier
  - coordinates: 47.88385°N 71.43278°W
  - elevation: 828 m (2,717 ft)
- Mouth: Rivière aux Écorces
  - location: Lac-Moncouche
  - coordinates: 47.95778°N 71.53833°W
  - elevation: 390 m (1,280 ft)
- Length: 55.2 km (34.3 mi)
- Discharge
  - location: Lac-Ministuk

Basin features
- Tributaries
  - left: (from the mouth) Décharge des lacs Bricheau et Broussard, décharge de quelques lacs dont le lac Mamming, le lac des Mousserons et l’Étang Foliacé, décharge du Petit lac Oligny.
  - right: (from the mouth) Décharge du lac du Détour, ruisseau Sancto, ruisseau Girard, décharge du Lac du Panache, rivière aux Canots Est, décharge du lac Lampron, ruisseau Caché, décharge du lac Boulard, décharge du lac Jubinville, ruisseau Wellie, décharge du Lac en Chenille.

The Rivière aux Canots is a tributary of the Rivière aux Écorces, in the province of Quebec, in Canada. Rivière aux Canots crosses the MRC of:

- La Côte-de-Beaupré Regional County Municipality (administrative region of Capitale-Nationale): unorganized territory of Lac-Jacques-Cartier;
- Lac-Saint-Jean-Est Regional County Municipality (administrative region of Saguenay–Lac-Saint-Jean): in the unorganized territory of Lac-Moncouche.

The course of the Rivière aux Canots crosses the Laurentides Wildlife Reserve.

The small valley of the Rivière aux Canots is located near route 169. This valley is also served by some secondary forest roads, especially for forestry and recreational tourism activities.

Forestry is the main economic activity in this valley; recreational tourism, second.

The surface of the Rivière aux Canots is usually frozen from the beginning of December to the end of March, however the safe circulation on the ice is generally made from mid-December to mid-March.

== Geography ==
The main watersheds neighboring the Rivière aux Canots are:

- north side: White brook, Sancto brook, Girard brook, Panache lake, rivière aux Canots Est, Wellie brook, Apica River, Rivière aux Écorces;
- east side: Apica River, Mitchell Lake, Mignault Lake, Leboeuf Creek, Pikauba River;
- south side: Belley lake, Roy brook, Portage brook, rivière aux Écorces North-East, Rivière aux Écorces, Bolduc lake, Trompeur Lake, Rousseau Lake;
- west side: Rivière aux Écorces, Gabrielle stream.

The Rivière aux Canots rises at Lac Fleuret (length: 0.5 kilometres (0.31 mi); altitude: 828 metres (2,717 ft)) in the forest zone in the Laurentides Wildlife Reserve. This source is located at:

- 1.1 kilometres (0.68 mi) west of Lac Oligny;
- 1.3 kilometres (0.81 mi) north of the Rivière aux Canots;
- 2.1 kilometres (1.3 mi) south-west of Lemay Lake which is crossed by the Apica River;
- 5.4 kilometres (3.4 mi) southwest of the route 169 which runs along the Pikauba River in this segment;
- 9.2 kilometres (5.7 mi) south of Mont-Apica;
- 23.8 kilometres (14.8 mi) east of the confluence of Rivière aux Canots and Rivière aux Écorces;
- south-east of lac Saint-Jean.

From its source (Lac Fleuret), the Rivière aux Canots flows over 55.2 kilometres (34.3 mi) with a drop of 438 metres (1,437 ft) entirely in the forest zone, according to the following segments:

Upper course of the Rivière aux Canots (segment of 16.9 kilometres (10.5 mi))

- 0.8 kilometres (0.50 mi) south-east, then north-east across 0.2 kilometres (0.12 mi) across Thompson Lake (length: 0.5 kilometres (0.31 mi); altitude: 782 metres (2,566 ft)) to its mouth;
- 2.0 kilometres (1.2 mi) to the east, then south crossing Lake Oligny (length: 1.3 kilometres (0.81 mi); altitude: 757 metres (2,484 ft)) on its full length, to its mouth;
- 14.1 kilometres (8.8 mi) towards the west, by collecting at the beginning of the segment the discharge (coming from the east) of Petit lac Oligny, by collecting the discharge (coming from the north) of the lake in Chenille and by curving south to a stream (coming from the east);

Intermediate course of the Rivière aux Canots (segment of 14.2 kilometres (8.8 mi))

- 4.0 kilometres (2.5 mi) north-west to Willie Creek (coming from the north-east);
- 2.3 kilometres (1.4 mi) north-west, to the outlet (coming from the south) of a set of small lakes including Escarpment Lake and Foliaceous Pond;
- 2.5 kilometres (1.6 mi) to the north, successively forming four loops to the east, up to the Caché stream (coming from the north);
- 3.1 kilometres (1.9 mi) towards the north-east, forming a large curve towards the south-west, up to the outlet of Lac Lampron (coming from the east);
- 2.3 kilometres (1.4 mi) north-west, up to the rivière aux Canots Est (coming from the east);

Lower reaches of the Rivière aux Canots (segment of 24.1 kilometres (15.0 mi))

- 2.5 kilometres (1.6 mi) north-west, up to the outlet (coming from the north) of Lac du Panache;
- 4.6 kilometres (2.9 mi) south to a bend in the river, then north-west to the outlet (coming from the south-east) of a few lakes including Bolduc lake;
- 6.2 kilometres (3.9 mi) towards the west by collecting a stream (coming from the north) and the Girard stream (coming from the north) whose confluence is approximately on the limit of the regions Capitale-Nationale and Saguenay–Lac-Saint-Jean, to Sancto stream (coming from the north);
- 2.8 kilometres (1.7 mi) southward, to the outlet (coming from the southeast) of lakes Bricheau and Broussard;
- 8.0 kilometres (5.0 mi) north-east, east, then south while winding, to its mouth.

The Rivière aux Canots flows onto the east bank of Rivière aux Écorces. This confluence is located at:

- 21.0 kilometres (13.0 mi) east of the course of the Métabetchouane River;
- 18.0 kilometres (11.2 mi) south-west of route 169;
- 37.2 kilometres (23.1 mi) south of the confluence of the Pikauba River and the Rivière aux Écorces;
- 47.7 kilometres (29.6 mi) south of the confluence of the Pikauba River and Kenogami lake;
- 68.6 kilometres (42.6 mi) southwest of the confluence of the Chicoutimi River and the Saguenay River in the Chicoutimi sector of the city of Saguenay (city).

From the mouth of Rivière aux Canots, the current successively follows the course of Rivière aux Écorces on 52.8 kilometres (32.8 mi) generally towards the north, the course of Pikauba River on 10.6 kilometres (6.6 mi) generally towards the north, crosses Kenogami Lake on 17.6 kilometres (10.9 mi) towards the northeast until barrage de Portage-des-Roches, then follows the course of the Chicoutimi River on 26.2 kilometres (16.3 mi) towards the east, then the northeast and the course of the Saguenay River on 114.6 kilometres (71.2 mi) towards the east to Tadoussac where it merges with the Saint Lawrence Estuary.

== Toponymy ==
The toponym “Rivière aux Canots” was formalized on December 5, 1968, at the Place Names Bank of the Commission de toponymie du Québec.

== Appendices ==
=== Related articles ===
- La Côte-de-Beaupré Regional County Municipality
- Lac-Jacques-Cartier, a TNO
- Lac-Saint-Jean-Est Regional County Municipality
- Lac-Moncouche, a TNO
- Laurentides Wildlife Reserve
- Rivière aux Canots Est
- Rivière aux Écorces
- Pikauba River
- Kenogami Lake
- Chicoutimi River
- Saguenay River
- List of rivers of Quebec
