= Rivière aux Montagnais =

- Location within Quebec

Location
- Country: Canada
- Province: Quebec
- Region: Capitale-Nationale
- Regional County Municipality: La Côte-de-Beaupré Regional County Municipality
- Municipalities: Lac-Jacques-Cartier

Physical characteristics
- Source: Starr Lake
  - location: Lac-Jacques-Cartier
  - coordinates: 47.86651°N 71.90729°W
  - elevation: 499 m (1,637 ft)
- Mouth: Moncouche River
  - location: Lac-Jacques-Cartier
  - coordinates: 47.94056°N 71.97278°W
  - elevation: 400 m (1,300 ft)
- Length: 27.4 km (17.0 mi)
- Discharge
  - location: Lac-Jacques-Cartier

Basin features
- Tributaries
  - left: (upward from the mouth) ruisseau non identifié, ruisseau non identifié, ruisseau non identifié, décharge du lac Potvin, ruisseau de l'Amitié, ruisseau non identifié
  - right: (upward from the mouth) ruisseau non identifié, décharge du lac Corbeil, décharge des lacs Couillard, Coulombe et Petit lac Coulombe, ruisseau Contourné, décharge du lac Houlette (via le Lac aux Montagnais), trois ruisseaux non identifiés.

The Rivière aux Montagnais is a tributary of the southeast bank of the Moncouche River, flowing in the Laurentides Wildlife Reserve, in the unorganized territory of Lac-Jacques-Cartier, in the La Côte-de-Beaupré Regional County Municipality, in the administrative region of Capitale-Nationale, in the province from Quebec, to Canada.

Forestry is the main economic activity in this valley; recreational tourism, second.

The surface of the Montagnais river (except the rapids zones) is usually frozen from the end of November to the beginning of April, however the safe circulation on the ice is generally done from mid-December to the end of March.

== Geography ==
The main watersheds neighboring the "Rivière aux Montagnais" are:

- north side: Moncouche River and the Moncouche Lake, Saint-Véran Lake, the Métabetchouane River, the Huard lake and the ruisseau Contourné;
- east side: Rivière aux Écorces;
- south side: Métabetchouane River, Métascouac Lake;
- west side: Métabetchouane River, Lake Kiskissink le Métabetchouane Lake Grand Lake Bostonnais.

The Montagnais river rises at the mouth of Lac Magny (length: 0.6 kilometres (0.37 mi); altitude: 499 metres (1,637 ft)). This misshapen lake has four bays; its mouth is located at the bottom of the south-eastern bay.

From its source (mouth of Lake Magny), the course of the Montagnais river descends on 27.4 kilometres (17.0 mi), with a drop of 99 metres (325 ft), according to these segments:

Upper part of Rivière aux Montagnais (segment of 6.7 kilometres (4.2 mi))

- 0.5 kilometres (0.31 mi) south, to the north shore of Lac aux Cailloux;
- 0.5 metres (1 ft 8 in) eastward across Lac aux Cailloux (length: 0.9 kilometres (0.56 mi) in the shape of a boot; altitude: 494 metres (1,621 ft)) until its mouth;
- 2.4 metres (7 ft 10 in) towards the south-east, crossing across a large area of marsh, to the south shore of lac aux Montagnais;
- 3.3 kilometres (2.1 mi) north, then north-west across Lac aux Montagnais (length: 3.8 kilometres (2.4 mi); altitude: 494 metres (1,621 ft)) to its mouth located at the bottom of a bay on the west shore;

Lower part of the Rivière aux Montagnais (segment of 20.7 kilometres (12.9 mi))

- 0.7 kilometres (0.43 mi) towards the northwest, up to the Amitié stream;
- 10.8 kilometres (6.7 mi) towards the northwest in particular by collecting the discharge (coming from the southwest) of the Potvin lake and by forming some serpentines, until its confluence of the ruisseau Contourné;
- 2.6 kilometres (1.6 mi) south, then southwest up to a bend in the river;
- 4.0 kilometres (2.5 mi) towards the northwest by forming some large coils and collecting the discharge (coming from the north) from lakes Couillard, Coulombe and Petit lac Coulombe, up to the discharge of the lake Corbeil;
- 2.6 kilometres (1.6 mi) towards the northwest to a stream (coming from the north), then towards the west, forming a hook towards the northwest at the end of the segment, until its mouth.

From the confluence of the Montagnais river, the current descends:

- 5.0 kilometres (3.1 mi) the Moncouche River toward South up to its mouth;
- 83.9 kilometres (52.1 mi) the Métabetchouane River toward North up to the south shore of lac Saint-Jean;
- 22.8 kilometres (14.2 mi) towards the northeast crossing the lac Saint-Jean;
- 172.3 kilometres (107.1 mi) following the course of the Saguenay River via La Petite Décharge up to Tadoussac where it merges with the Saint Lawrence estuary.

== Toponymy ==
The toponym Rivière aux Montagnais was formalized on June 1, 1971, at the Place Names Bank of the Commission de toponymie du Québec.

== See also ==
- St. Lawrence River
- List of rivers of Quebec
