= Saint-Henri-de-Taillon =

- Municipality
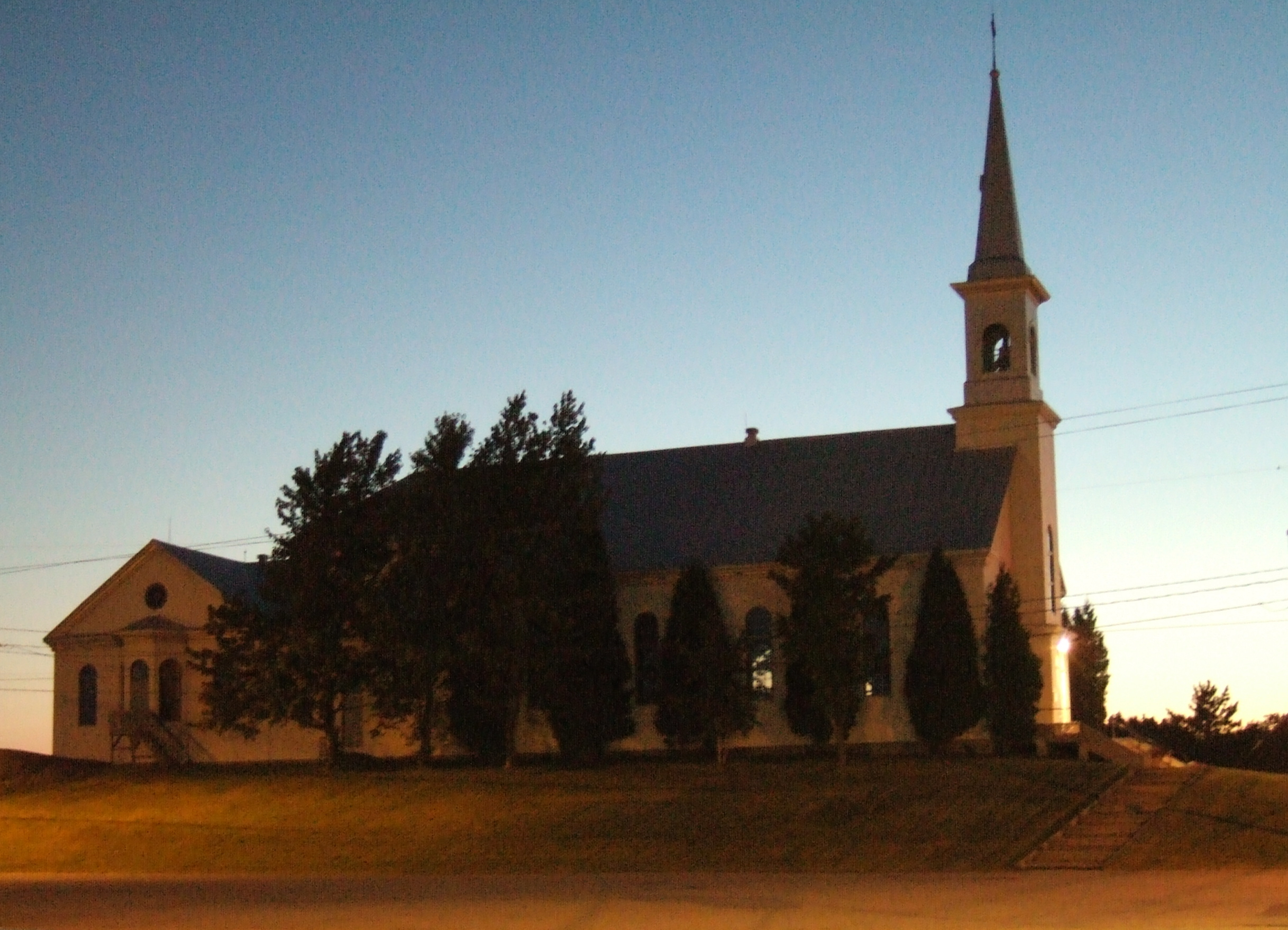
- Church of Saint-Henri-de-Taillon

- Location in Saguenay–Lac-Saint-Jean Quebec.
- Coordinates: 48°40′N 71°50′W
- Country: Canada
- Province: Quebec
- Region: Saguenay–Lac-Saint-Jean
- RCM: Lac-Saint-Jean-Est
- Settled: 1890s
- Constituted: August 12, 1903

Government
  - Mayor: Laval Fortin
  - Federal riding: Lac-Saint-Jean
  - Prov. riding: Lac-Saint-Jean

Area
  - Total: 62.20 km^{2} (24.02 sq mi)
  - Land: 61.74 km^{2} (23.84 sq mi)

Population (2021)
  - Total: 803
  - Density: 13/km^{2} (34/sq mi)
  - Pop 2016-2021: ▼2.8%
  - Dwellings: 504
- Time zone: UTC−5 (EST)
  - Summer (DST): UTC−4 (EDT)
- Postal code(s): G0W 2X0
- Area codes: 418 and 581
- Highways: R-169
- Website: www.ville.st-henri-de-taillon.qc.ca

Saint-Henri-de-Taillon (French pronunciation: [sɛ̃ ɑ̃ʁi də tajɔ̃]) is a municipality in Quebec, Canada.

== Demographics ==
Population trend:

- Population in 2021: 803 (2016 to 2021 population change: -2.8%)
- Population in 2016: 821 (2011 to 2016 population change: 8.0%)
- Population in 2011: 760 (2006 to 2011 population change: 2.8%)
- Population in 2006: 739
- Population in 2001: 776
- Population in 1996: 743
- Population in 1991: 714
- Population in 1986: 772
- Population in 1981: 738
- Population in 1976: 677
- Population in 1971: 740
- Population in 1966: 814
- Population in 1961: 907
- Population in 1956: 903
- Population in 1951: 871
- Population in 1941: 740
- Population in 1931: 709
- Population in 1921: 798
- Population in 1911: 626

Private dwellings occupied by usual residents: 362 (total dwellings: 504)

Mother tongue:

- English as first language: 0.6%
- French as first language: 99.4%
- English and French as first language: 0%
- Other as first language: 0%

== See also ==
- List of municipalities in Quebec
