= Desbiens, Quebec =

Desbiens
- City
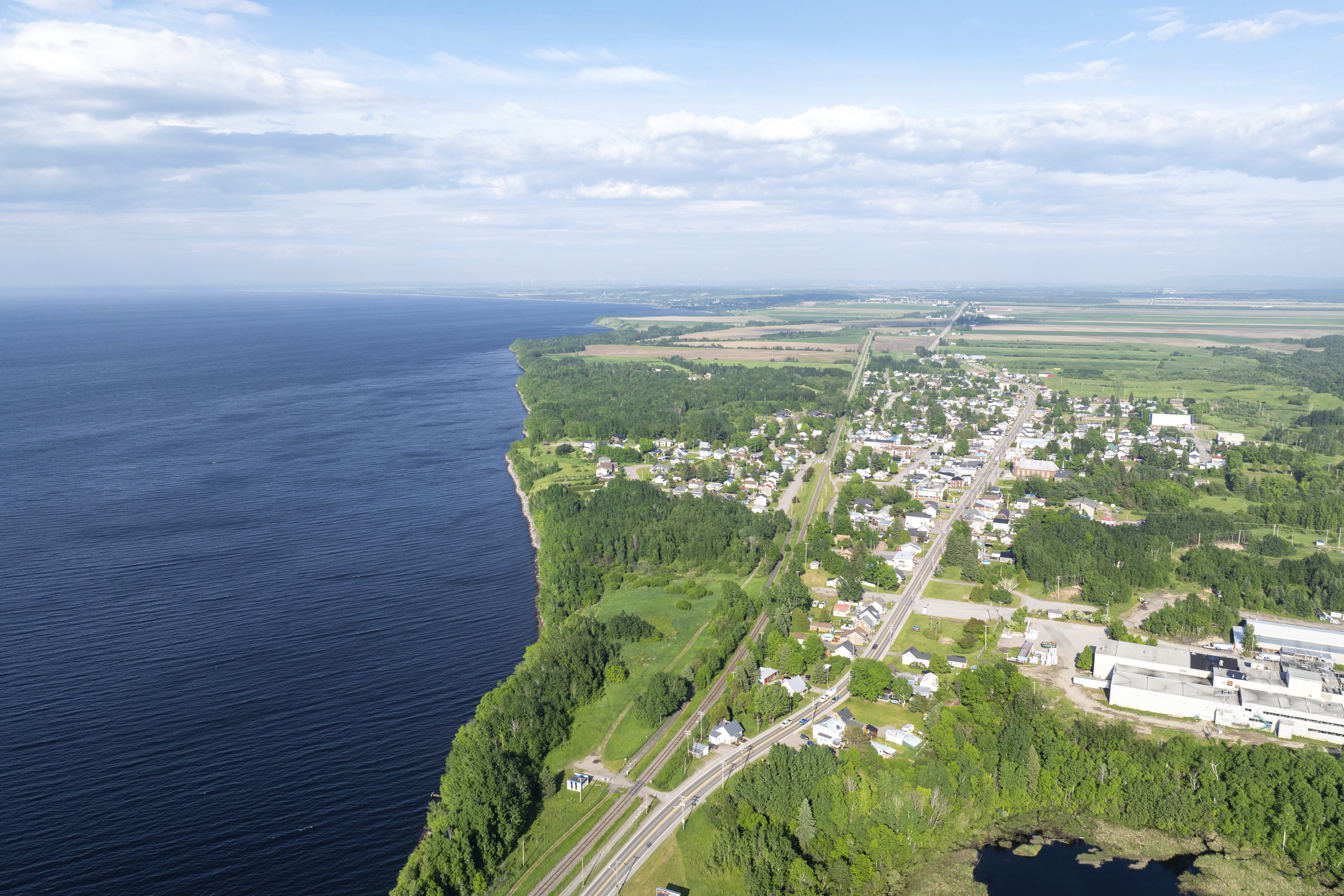
- Desbiens in 2026

- Location in Saguenay–Lac-Saint-Jean Quebec.
- Coordinates: 48°25′N 71°57′W
- Country: Canada
- Province: Quebec
- Region: Saguenay–Lac-Saint-Jean
- RCM: Lac-Saint-Jean-Est
- Constituted: August 16, 1926

Government
  - Mayor: Ginette Sirois
  - Federal riding: Lac-Saint-Jean
  - Prov. riding: Lac-Saint-Jean

Area
  - Total: 10.90 km^{2} (4.21 sq mi)
  - Land: 10.39 km^{2} (4.01 sq mi)

Population (2021)
  - Total: 995
  - Density: 95.7/km^{2} (248/sq mi)
  - Pop 2016-2021: ▼3.2%
  - Dwellings: 523
- Time zone: UTC−5 (EST)
  - Summer (DST): UTC−4 (EDT)
- Postal code(s): G0W 1N0
- Area codes: 418 and 581
- Highways: R-169
- Climate: Dfb
- Website: www.ville.desbiens.qc.ca

Desbiens (French pronunciation: [debjɛ̃]) is a ville in the Canadian province of Quebec, located in Lac-Saint-Jean-Est Regional County Municipality. It is on the shores of Lac Saint-Jean at the mouth of the Métabetchouane River.

== Demographics ==
In the 2021 Census of Population conducted by Statistics Canada, Desbiens had a population of 995 living in 475 of its 523 total private dwellings, a change of −3.2% from its 2016 population of 1,028. With a land area of 10.39 km^{2} (4.01 sq mi), it had a population density of 95.8/km^{2} (248.0/sq mi) in 2021.

Population trend:

- Population in 2021: 995 (2016 to 2021 population change: -3.2%)
- Population in 2016: 1028
- Population in 2011: 1053
- Population in 2006: 1074
- Population in 2001: 1128
- Population in 1996: 1202
- Population in 1991: 1265

Mother tongue:

- English as first language: 0%
- French as first language: 98.6%
- English and French as first language: 0%
- Other as first language: 1.4%

== See also ==
- List of cities in Quebec
