= White Portland cement =

Type of cement

White Portland cement or white ordinary Portland cement (WOPC) is similar to ordinary, gray Portland cement in all aspects except for its high degree of whiteness. Obtaining this color requires substantial modifications to the method of manufacturing. It requires a much lower content in colored impurities in the raw materials (essentially limestone and clay) used to produce clinker: low levels of Cr_{2}O_{3}, Mn_{2}O_{3}, and Fe_{2}O_{3}), but above all, a higher temperature is needed for the final sintering step in the cement kiln (1600 to 1700 °C in place of 1450 °C for ordinary Portland cement) because of the higher melting point of the mix depleted in iron oxides (serving as flux in Portland cement). Because of this, the process is more energy demanding and the white cement is somewhat more expensive than the gray product.

== Uses ==
White Portland cement is used in combination with white aggregates to produce white concrete for prestige construction projects and decorative work. White concrete usually takes the form of pre-cast cladding panels, since it is not economical to use white cement for structural purposes. White Portland cement is also used in combination with inorganic pigments to produce brightly colored concretes and mortars. Ordinary cement, when used with pigments, produces colors that may be attractive, but are somewhat dull. With white cement, bright reds, yellows and greens can be readily produced. Blue concrete can also be made, at some expense. The pigments may be added at the concrete mixer. Alternatively, to guarantee repeatable color, some manufacturers supply ready-blended colored cements, using white cement as a base. To be "white", the powdered material must have a reflectance value ("L value") in excess of 85%. A particular success in the use of WOPC and added pigments is monocouche renders.

In some countries an off-white clinker, which gives a reflectance value over 70 when ground, is produced at a cost only a little over normal gray clinker. When this is blended with ground blast furnace slag (up to 60% depending on use and early strength) a cement with reflectance over 80 can be produced. The blended cement can have a production cost less than General Purpose Portland cement (gray), but normally attracts a margin as it is sold to compete with white Portland cement.

== Manufacture ==
=== Raw mix formulation ===
The characteristic greenish-gray to brown color of ordinary Portland cement derives from a number of transition elements in its chemical composition. These are, in decreasing order of coloring effect, chromium, manganese, iron, copper, vanadium, nickel and titanium. The amount of these in white cement is minimized as far as possible. Cr_{2}O_{3} is kept below 0.003%, Mn_{2}O_{3} is kept below 0.03%, and Fe_{2}O_{3} is kept below 0.35% in the clinker. The other elements are usually not a significant problem. Portland cement is usually made from cheap, quarried raw materials, and these usually contain substantial amounts of Cr, Mn and Fe. For example, limestones used in cement manufacture usually contain 0.3-1% Fe_{2}O_{3}, whereas levels below 0.1% are sought in limestones for white manufacture. Typical clays used in gray cement rawmix may contain 5-15% Fe_{2}O_{3}. Levels below 0.5% are desirable, and conventional clays are usually replaced with kaolin. Kaolin is fairly low in SiO_{2}, and so a large amount of sand is usually also included in the mix. Iron and manganese usually occur together in nature, so that selection of low-iron materials usually ensures that manganese content is also low, but chromium can arise from other sources, notably from the wear of chrome steel grinding equipment during the production of rawmix. See rawmill. This wear is exacerbated by the high sand-content of the mix, which makes it extremely abrasive. Furthermore, to make a combinable rawmix, the sand must be ground to below 45 μm particle diameter. Often this is achieved by grinding the sand separately, using ceramic grinding media to limit the chromium contamination.

With off-white clinker the calculated Fe_{2}O_{3} level in clinker is higher (0.6-0.8%) Coal can be used (if the ash has little Fe_{2}O_{3} or other trace elements). The ash in the coal is helpful in the reaction because it is finer than the ground raw materials and it reaches higher temperatures and is molten in the flame. Kaolin is sometimes found in association with coal deposits. It may be possible to use coal washery waste, oil shale and spent oil shale ash. Off-white clinker has a calculated C_{3}A (tricalcium aluminate) of 7-9%. When blended with ground granulated blast furnace slag it can meet requirements for sulfate resistance and low heat.

=== Kiln operation ===
In general, the rotary kilns used to chemically combine the raw materials are operated at a higher peak temperature (1600°C) than that required for gray clinker manufacture (1450°C). This requires a higher fuel consumption (typically 20-50% more), and results in lower kiln output (typically 20-50% less) for a given sized kiln. The reason for this is the relatively small amount of molten liquid produced during sintering, because of the low iron-content of the mix. The final reaction in the kiln, conversion of belite to alite, requires the melt liquid as a solvent, and is slower if the amount of melt is low. This can be partially compensated by adding to the rawmix a combination of calcium and fluoride in the form of calcium fluoride or waste cryolite. This combination lowers the melting temperature. In cases where the clinker Fe_{2}O_{3} content is above 0.2% (which is almost always the case), the unique processes of "bleaching" and "quenching" are also employed. "Bleaching" involves directing a second flame (apart from that used to heat the kiln) onto the bed of clinker close to the kiln exit to reduce Fe(III) to Fe(II). This reduction is rigorously avoided in gray cement production, because of the deleterious effect it can have on clinker quality. But in white clinker production, where the iron content is low, this is not an issue. Subsequently, to prevent the re-oxidation of the iron, "quenching" is performed. This consists of rapidly lowering the clinker temperature from 1200°C to below 600°C in a few seconds, as it leaves the kiln. This usually involves dropping it into water and removing it quickly with a screw or passing it through a curtain of water sprays. This contributes to the relatively poor energy efficiency of the process, since the sensible heat of the clinker is not recycled as in normal clinker manufacturer.

The temperature in the kiln is not necessarily higher than gray clinker production but it appears higher due to the reflectance especially in gas fired kilns (which do have a higher flame temperature). With off-white clinker coal firing can be used which has many advantages for costs and output. It is important to finely grind the coal and have a burner which gives a very short bright flame (high velocity low primary air) so that the excess oxygen can be kept low close to zero with maybe 0.1% CO. There is no need for a second flame if combustion in the coal flame is rapid and controlled. The Off-white clinker has a light greenish colour due to Fe(II). Rotary kilns have limitations on output based on the surface area required for the heat transfer. Few old kiln process can reach the surface area limits due to limits in auxiliary equipment such as fuel input (e.g. lack of precalcination), grinding of coal and raw materials, exhaust fan capacity, chemical control of raw mix, burner quality, kiln control etc. With well operated off-white clinker production kiln output can be only a few percent lower than gray clinker production.

=== Clinker grinding and handling ===
The clinker is next ground to cement (perhaps after a drying stage). Here calcium sulfate is added to control set, in the form of a high-purity grade of gypsum or anhydrite. In some specifications (not ASTM), a small amount of titanium dioxide may be added to improve reflectance. At all stages, great care is needed to avoid contamination with colored materials.

== Specifications ==
White Portland cement differs physically from gray cement only in terms of its color. Its setting behavior and strength development are essentially the same as that expected in gray cement, and it meets standard specifications such as ASTM C 150 and EN 197. In practice, because much white cement is used in pre-cast concrete products, it is commonly made to a high-early strength specification such as ASTM C 150 Type III. This aids concrete manufacturers' production rate. Higher potential strength also helps to counteract the strength-diminishing effects of pigment addition. In addition to the usual specifications, manufacturers guarantee the whiteness of the product, typically in terms of a reflectance measurement, such as L*a*b L-value, or tristimulus. In the latter case, because off-color white cement tends to be greenish, the Tri-Y (green) value is used. Because the color so much depends upon the "bleaching" and "quenching" operations, merely specifying a low iron content does not guarantee good whiteness.

== See also ==
- Energetically modified cement
- Quenching
- Sintering
