= Monocouche renders =

Monocouche renders are a type of decorative finish applied to the outside of buildings to provide both decoration and weather protection.

Derived from the French, and meaning mono or single layer, Monocouche renders are modern single coat renders which can be applied by hand or machine. Colour pigmented throughout, meaning no building painting, monocouche renders provide a low maintenance, weather resistant, hard wearing and attractive finish to a large range of external brick and blockwork properties.

The French term monocouche has been adopted by the European render industry, in an attempt to distinguish modern renders and their application methods from those of traditional renders and their application methods. It refers to the development of more advanced render formulations that can be applied in one coat to form and cure as one monolithic layer on the elevation of a building.

There are other terms that can be used to refer to these types of decorative finishes. A through colour render and a scraped finish render are also indications that a monocouche product has been employed. They refer to the manufacturing process and the application process.

The formulation of a monocouche render is distinguished by the use of White Ordinary Portland Cement as a binder which then enables the formulation to be pigmented. The addition of pigments will give a manufacturer the opportunity to produce a colour range and employ the term through colour render as when the product is applied and finished the pigment will bind in place, all the way through the body of the render.

This factor marks the biggest difference between modern renders and traditional renders that use grey Ordinary Portland Cement and hence cannot be pigmented successfully. A traditional render would have to receive a mist coat of paint and several topcoats to achieve a thoroughly coloured decorative finish.
