= Saint-André-du-Lac-Saint-Jean =

- Village municipality

- Location in Saguenay–Lac-Saint-Jean Quebec
- Coordinates: 48°19′N 71°59′W
- Country: Canada
- Province: Quebec
- Region: Saguenay–Lac-Saint-Jean
- RCM: Le Domaine-du-Roy
- Constituted: November 29, 1969

Government
  - Mayor: Claire Desbiens
  - Federal riding: Lac-Saint-Jean
  - Prov. riding: Roberval

Area
  - Total: 146.50 km^{2} (56.56 sq mi)
  - Land: 145.43 km^{2} (56.15 sq mi)

Population (2021)
  - Total: 453
  - Density: 3.1/km^{2} (8.0/sq mi)
  - Pop (2016–21): ▼3.0%
  - Dwellings: 231
- Time zone: UTC−5 (EST)
  - Summer (DST): UTC−4 (EDT)
- Postal code(s): G0W 2K0
- Area codes: 418 and 581
- Highways: No major routes
- Website: municipalites-du-quebec.com/st-andre-du-lac-st-jean/

Saint-André-du-Lac-Saint-Jean (French pronunciation: [sɛ̃ ɑ̃dʁe dy lak sɛ̃ ʒɑ̃]) is a village municipality, in Le Domaine-du-Roy Regional County Municipality, in Quebec, in Canada.

== Demographics ==
In the 2021 Census of Population conducted by Statistics Canada, Saint-André-du-Lac-Saint-Jean had a population of 453 living in 208 of its 231 total private dwellings, a change of −3% from its 2016 population of 467. With a land area of 145.43 km^{2} (56.15 sq mi), it had a population density of 3.1/km^{2} (8.1/sq mi) in 2021.

Population trend:

- Population in 2021: 453 (2016 to 2021 population change: -3%)
- Population in 2016: 467
- Population in 2011: 488
- Population in 2006: 484
- Population in 2001: 554
- Population in 1996: 580
- Population in 1991: 606
- Population in 1986: 623
- Population in 1981: 582
- Population in 1976: 565
- Population in 1971: 610

Mother tongue:

- English as first language: 0%
- French as first language: 100%
- English and French as first language: 0%
- Other as first language: 0%
