= Métabetchouane Lake =

Lake in Canada

- Location within Quebec
- Location: Lac-Moncouche, Saguenay–Lac-Saint-Jean, Quebec
- Coordinates: 47.96056°N 72.08694°W
- Type: Naturel
- Primary inflows: Métabetchouane River
- Primary outflows: Métabetchouane River
- Basin countries: Canada
- Max. length: 12.5 km (7.8 mi)
- Max. width: 1.5 km (0.93 mi)
- Shore length^{1}: catchment
- Surface elevation: 382 m (1,253 ft)
- ^{1} Shore length is not a well-defined measure.

The lac Métabetchouane is a fresh body of water crossed by the Métabetchouane River, in the unorganized territory of Lac-Moncouche, in the Lac-Saint-Jean-Est Regional County Municipality, in the administrative region of Saguenay–Lac-Saint-Jean, in the province in Quebec, to Canada. This lake constitutes the demarcation between the Laurentides Wildlife Reserve (east side - administrative region of Saguenay–Lac-Saint-Jean) and zec Kiskissink (west side - administrative region of Mauricie - La Tuque).

The lake Métabetchouane is indirectly served by the route 155 (connecting La Tuque and Chambord). A few secondary forest roads serve this area for the purposes of forestry and recreational tourism activities.

Forestry is the main economic activity in the sector; recreational tourism, second.

The surface of Métabetchouane Lake is usually frozen from the beginning of December to the end of March, however the safe circulation on the ice is generally made from mid-December to mid-March.

== Geography ==
The main watersheds near lake Métabetchouane are:

- north side: Métabetchouane River, Chaîne River, Chute River, Fouet River;
- east side: Moncouche River, rivière aux Écorces, Lac aux Écorces;
- south side: Great Bostonnais Lake, Bostonnais River, Kiskissink Lake, Métabetchouane River;
- west side: Commissioners River, Perche river, Croche river.

The lake Métabetchouane has a length of 12.5 km (7.8 mi), a width of 1.5 km (0.93 mi) and an altitude of 382 m (1,253 ft). This lake is mainly fed by the outlet of the Métabetchouane River (coming from the east via Naquagami bay), riverside streams, the outlet of lakes Voisard, Bellevalle and Bohémier, the outlet of lakes Chaunard and Biliette, the outlet of Lac du Sillon and the outlet of Lac Mallette. The Métabetchouane River crosses this lake for 10.5 km (6.5 mi) to the northwest.

A peninsula stretching over 1.1 km (0.68 mi) to the north separates two bays: one (east side) stretches over 4.8 km (3.0 mi) towards the south. The other bay (west side) stretches for 1.5 km (0.93 mi) to the south. While Naquagami Bay stretches for 2.0 km (1.2 mi) to the east to collect the discharge from the Métabetchouane River.

The mouth of Métabetchouane Lake is located at the bottom of a bay at the far north of the lake, at:

- 8.1 km (5.0 mi) north-east of the bottom of a bay in Grand lac Bostonnais;
- 6.9 km (4.3 mi) north of Kiskissink Lake;
- 8.6 km (5.3 mi) north-east of the center of the village of Van Bruyssel located along the Canadian National railway;
- 15.4 km (9.6 mi) east of lac des Commissaires;
- 40.8 km (25.4 mi) north of the village center of Lac-Édouard;
- 48.1 km (29.9 mi) south of the mouth of the Métabetchouane river, on the south shore of lac Saint-Jean.

From the mouth of Métabetchouane Lake, the current follows the course of:

- the Métabetchouane river on 70.0 km (43.5 mi) generally towards the northwest;
- the lac Saint-Jean on 22.25 km (13.83 mi) north-east until la petite Décharge;
- the Saguenay River via the Petite Décharge on 172.3 km (107.1 mi) eastward to Tadoussac where it merges with the Saint Lawrence estuary.

== Toponymy ==
The toponym "lac Métabetchouane" was formalized on December 5, 1968, by the Commission de toponymie du Québec.

== Appendices ==
=== Related articles ===
- Lac-Saint-Jean-Est Regional County Municipality
- Lac-Moncouche, a TNO
- La Tuque, a city
- Zec Kiskissink, a controlled harvesting zone
- Laurentides Wildlife Reserve
- Métabetchouane River
- Lac Saint-Jean
- Saguenay River
- St. Lawrence River
- List of lakes in Canada
