= Belle-Rivière, Quebec =

Unorganized territory in Quebec, Canada

Belle-Rivière
- Unorganized territory

- Location in Saguenay–Lac-Saint-Jean Quebec.
- Coordinates: 48°10′N 71°46′W
- Country: Canada
- Province: Quebec
- Region: Saguenay–Lac-Saint-Jean
- RCM: Lac-Saint-Jean-Est
- Constituted: unspecified

Government
  - Federal riding: Lac-Saint-Jean
  - Prov. riding: Lac-Saint-Jean

Area
  - Total: 646.60 km^{2} (249.65 sq mi)
  - Land: 608.47 km^{2} (234.93 sq mi)

Population (2021)
  - Total: 10
  - Density: 0/km^{2} (0/sq mi)
  - Pop 2016-2021: N/A
  - Dwellings: 18
- Time zone: UTC−05:00 (EST)
  - Summer (DST): UTC−04:00 (EDT)
- Highways: R-169

Belle-Rivière (French pronunciation: [bɛl ʁivjɛʁ]) is an unorganized territory in the Canadian province of Quebec, located in the regional county municipality of Lac-Saint-Jean-Est. It had a population of 10 in the Canada 2021 Census, and covered a land area of 608.47 km^{2}. The Métabetchouane River forms its western boundary.

The territory is named after la Belle Rivière ("the beautiful river") that has its source at Lac de la Belle Rivière ("Beautiful River Lake") that is also within the territory. The river was historically an important route for the natives and explorers of the Lac Saint-Jean region.

== See also ==
- List of unorganized territories in Quebec
