= Lac-Achouakan, Quebec =

Lac-Achouakan
- Unorganized territory

- Location in Saguenay–Lac-Saint-Jean Quebec.
- Coordinates: 48°07′N 71°39′W
- Country: Canada
- Province: Quebec
- Region: Saguenay–Lac-Saint-Jean
- RCM: Lac-Saint-Jean-Est
- Constituted: January 1, 1986

Government
  - Federal riding: Lac-Saint-Jean
  - Prov. riding: Lac-Saint-Jean

Area
  - Total: 240.90 km^{2} (93.01 sq mi)
  - Land: 227.35 km^{2} (87.78 sq mi)

Population (2011)
  - Total: 0
  - Density: 0/km^{2} (0/sq mi)
  - Pop 2006-2011: N/A
  - Dwellings: 0
- Time zone: UTC-5 (EST)
  - Summer (DST): UTC-4 (EDT)
- Highways: R-169

Lac-Achouakan is an unorganized territory in the Canadian province of Quebec, located in the regional county municipality of Lac-Saint-Jean-Est. It had a population of zero in the Canada 2006 Census, and covered a land area of 227.35 km^{2}, entirely within the Laurentides Wildlife Reserve. The western boundary of the territory is Bark River (Rivière aux Écorces), while Quebec Route 169 forms the eastern boundary.

The eponymous Lake Achouakan (48°06′34″N 71°38′55″W) is near and drains into the Bark River. Its name comes from the Innu-aimun language and means "bridge lake".

== See also ==
- List of unorganized territories in Quebec
