= Mont-Apica, Quebec =

Mont-Apica
- Unorganized territory
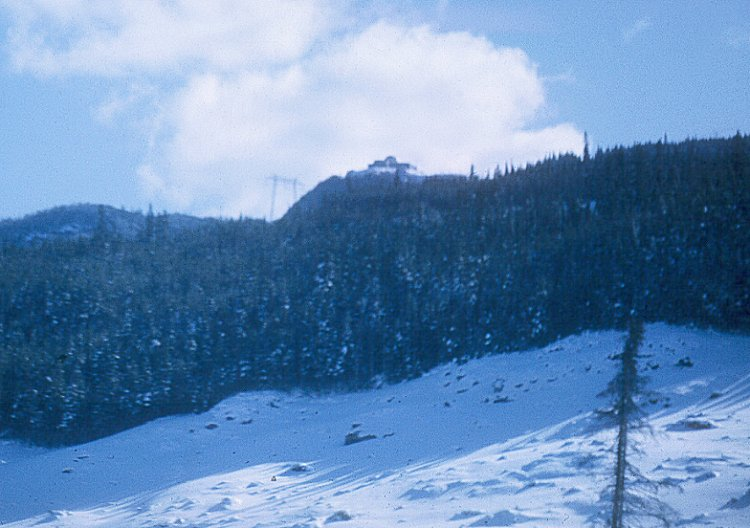
- Radar station on Mont Apica

- Location in Saguenay–Lac-Saint-Jean Quebec
- Coordinates: 47°59′N 71°26′W
- Country: Canada
- Province: Quebec
- Region: Saguenay–Lac-Saint-Jean
- RCM: Lac-Saint-Jean-Est
- Constituted: January 1, 1986

Government
  - Federal riding: Lac-Saint-Jean
  - Prov. riding: Lac-Saint-Jean

Area
  - Total: 12.70 km^{2} (4.90 sq mi)
  - Land: 12.68 km^{2} (4.90 sq mi)

Population (2011)
  - Total: 0
  - Density: 0/km^{2} (0/sq mi)
  - Pop 2006-2011: N/A
  - Dwellings: 0
- Time zone: UTC−05:00 (EST)
  - Summer (DST): UTC−04:00 (EDT)
- Highways: R-169

Mont-Apica is an unorganized territory in the Canadian province of Quebec, located in the regional county municipality of Lac-Saint-Jean-Est. It had a population of 0 in the Canada 2011 Census, and covered a land area of 12.68 km^{2}, entirely within the Laurentides Wildlife Reserve.

The territory was home to the former RCAF Station Mont Apica, located along Quebec Route 169 at the base of the namesake Mount Apica. Part of the Pinetree Line and NORAD, the station became operational in 1952 and had a staff of some 500 persons at its peak. Political and technological changes made the station redundant and it closed in 1990.

The Apica River, a small tributary of the Pikauba River, flows through the territory in a narrow and deep valley at the foot of the 884 metres (2,900 ft) high Mount Apica. The river and mountain were spelled as Upika or Upica until 1961, an Innu word meaning "narrowing river".

== Demographics ==
Population trend:

- Population in 2011: 0
- Population in 2006: 0
- Population in 2001: 0
- Population in 1996: 0
- Population in 1991: 5

== See also ==
- List of unorganized territories in Quebec
