= Lac-Moncouche, Quebec =

Lac-Moncouche
- Unorganized territory

- Location in Saguenay–Lac-Saint-Jean Quebec.
- Coordinates: 47°57′N 71°58′W
- Country: Canada
- Province: Quebec
- Region: Saguenay–Lac-Saint-Jean
- RCM: Lac-Saint-Jean-Est
- Constituted: January 1, 1986

Government
  - Federal riding: Lac-Saint-Jean
  - Prov. riding: Lac-Saint-Jean

Area
  - Total: 260.20 km^{2} (100.46 sq mi)
  - Land: 264.90 km^{2} (102.28 sq mi)
- There is an apparent contradiction between two authoritative sources

Population (2011)
  - Total: 0
  - Density: 0/km^{2} (0/sq mi)
  - Pop 2006-2011: N/A
  - Dwellings: 0
- Time zone: UTC-5 (EST)
  - Summer (DST): UTC−4 (EDT)
- Highways: R-169

Lac-Moncouche is an unorganized territory in the Canadian province of Quebec, located in the regional county municipality of Lac-Saint-Jean-Est. It had a population of 0 in the Canada 2011 Census and covers a land area of 264.90 km^{2}, entirely within the Laurentides Wildlife Reserve.

== See also ==
- List of unorganized territories in Quebec
