= Quebec Route 169 =

Highway in Quebec, Canada

Route 169

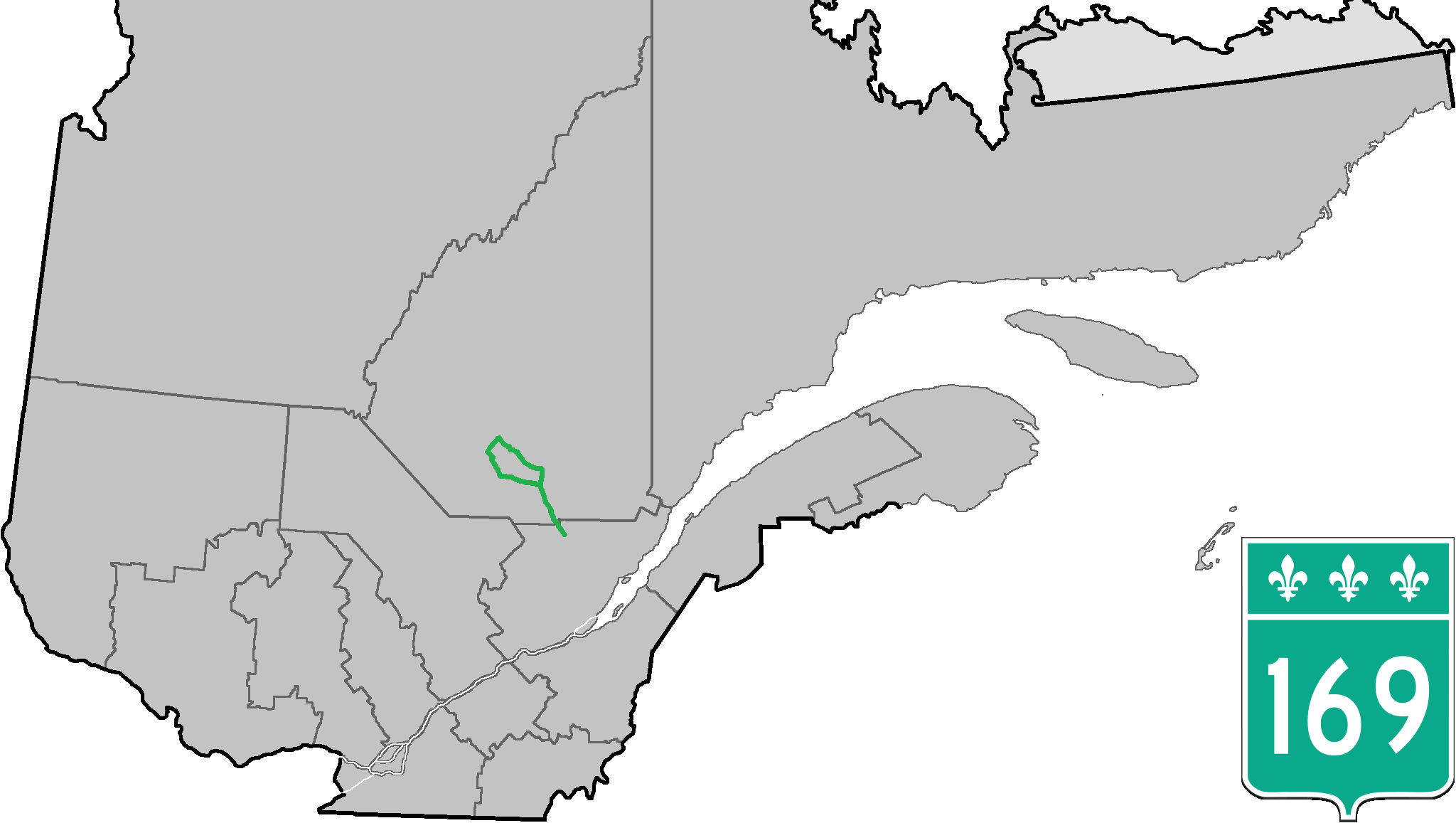

Route information
- Maintained by Transports Québec
- Length: 303.7 km (188.7 mi)

Major junctions
- South end: R-175 in Lac-Pikauba
- R-169 in Hébertville; R-170 in Métabetchouan–Lac-à-la-Croix; R-155 in Chambord; R-167 / R-373 in Saint-Félicien; R-373 in Dolbeau-Mistassini; R-172 in Alma; R-170 in Hébertville
- North end: R-169 in Hébertville

Location
- Country: Canada
- Province: Quebec
- Major cities: Alma, Dolbeau-Mistassini, Saint-Félicien

Highway system
- Quebec provincial highways; Autoroutes; List; Former
← R-167	→ R-170

Route 169 begins south of Lac Saint-Jean, Quebec, Canada, at Route 175. It proceeds north to Lac Saint-Jean at Alma and encircles the lake, returning to Alma and its terminus in Hebertville.

== Municipalities along Route 169 ==
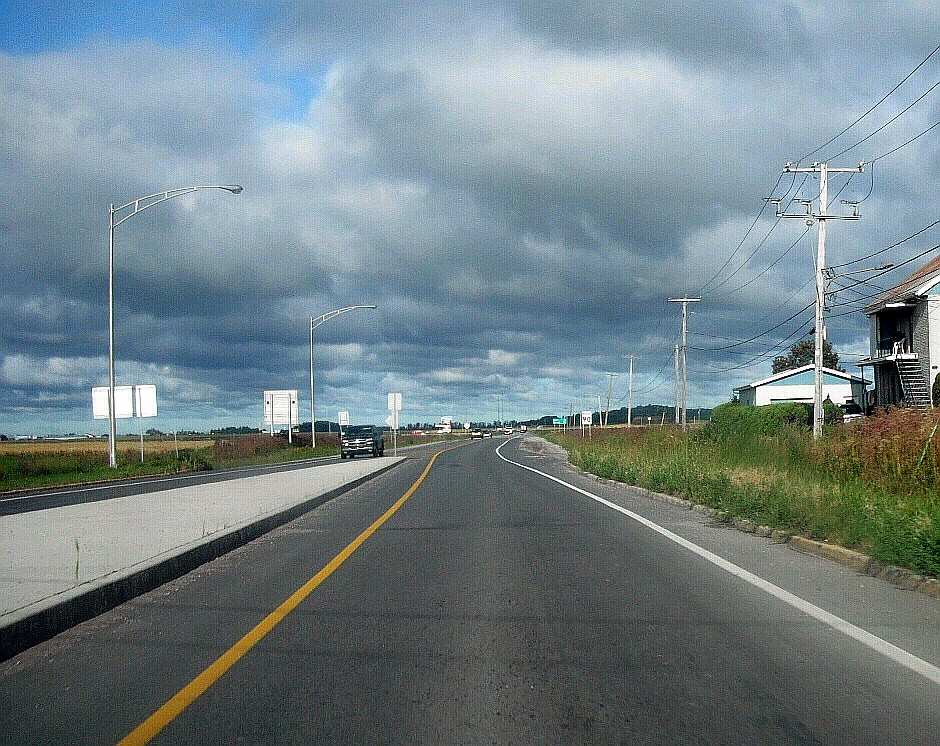
Quebec Route 169 in Métabetchouan–Lac-à-la-Croix

- Lac-Pikauba
- Lac-Jacques-Cartier
- Mont-Apica
- Lac-Achouakan
- Lac-Ministuk
- Belle-Rivière
- Hébertville
- Métabetchouan–Lac-à-la-Croix
- Desbiens
- Chambord
- Roberval
- Saint-Prime
- Saint-Félicien
- Normandin
- Albanel
- Dolbeau-Mistassini
- Sainte-Jeanne-d'Arc
- Peribonka
- Sainte-Monique
- Saint-Henri-de-Taillon
- Alma
- Hébertville

== See also ==
- List of Quebec provincial highways
