= Lac-Saint-Jean-Est Regional County Municipality =

Lac-Saint-Jean-Est
- Regional county municipality
- Coordinates: 48°33′N 71°39′W
- Country: Canada
- Province: Quebec
- Region: Saguenay–Lac-Saint-Jean
- Effective: January 1, 1982
- County seat: Alma

Government
  - Type: Prefecture
  - Prefect: André Paradis

Area
  - Total: 2,917.10 km^{2} (1,126.30 sq mi)
  - Land: 2,779.97 km^{2} (1,073.35 sq mi)

Population (2016)
  - Total: 52,741
  - Density: 19/km^{2} (49/sq mi)
  - Change 2011-2016: ▲0.4%
  - Dwellings: 25,450
- Time zone: UTC−5 (EST)
  - Summer (DST): UTC−4 (EDT)
- Area codes: 418 and 581
- Website: www.mrclacsaintjeanest.qc.ca

Lac-Saint-Jean-Est (French pronunciation: [lak sɛ̃ ʒɑ̃ ɛst]) is a regional county municipality in the Saguenay–Lac-Saint-Jean region of Quebec, Canada. The seat is Alma. In 2016, 99.3% reported that they spoke French most often at home, according to the census.

== Subdivisions ==
There are 18 subdivisions within the RCM:

Cities & Towns (3)

- Alma
- Desbiens
- Métabetchouan–Lac-à-la-Croix

Municipalities (8)

- Hébertville
- Labrecque
- Lamarche
- Sainte-Monique
- Saint-Gédéon
- Saint-Henri-de-Taillon
- Saint-Ludger-de-Milot
- Saint-Nazaire

Parishes (1)

- L'Ascension-de-Notre-Seigneur

Unorganized territory (4)

- Belle-Rivière
- Lac-Achouakan
- Lac-Moncouche
- Mont-Apica

== Demographics ==
=== Population ===
Canada census – Lac-Saint-Jean-Est community profile

| | 2021 | 2016 | 2011 |
| Population | 52,475 (-0.5% from 2016) | 52,741 (+0.4% from 2011) | 52,520 (+2.6% from 2006) |
| Land area | 2,767.51 km^{2} (1,068.54 sq mi) | 2,779.97 km^{2} (1,073.35 sq mi) | 2,781.44 km^{2} (1,073.92 sq mi) |
| Population density | 19/km^{2} (49/sq mi) | 19.0/km^{2} (49/sq mi) | 18.9/km^{2} (49/sq mi) |
| Median age | 47.2 (M: 46.4, F: 48.0) | 46.6 (M: 45.7, F: 47.6) | 45.3 (M: 44.2, F: 46.2) |
| Private dwellings | 25,764 (total) 23,497 (occupied) | 25,450 (total) | 24,653 (total) |
| Median household income | $69,500 | $58,076 | $52,048 |

References: 2021 2016 2011

Historical Census Data - Lac-Saint-Jean-Est Regional County Municipality, Quebec

| Year | Pop. | ±% |
|---|---|---|
| 1991 | 51,963 | — |
| 1996 | 52,401 | +0.8% |
| 2001 | 51,760 | −1.2% |

| Year | Pop. | ±% |
|---|---|---|
| 2006 | 51,170 | −1.1% |
| 2011 | 52,520 | +2.6% |
| 2016 | 52,741 | +0.4% |

=== Language ===
Canada Census Mother Tongue - Lac-Saint-Jean-Est Regional County Municipality, Quebec
| Census | Total | French | | | English | | | French & English | | | Other | | |
| Year | Responses | Count | Trend | Pop % | Count | Trend | Pop % | Count | Trend | Pop % | Count | Trend | Pop % |
| 2016 | 52,080 | 51,520 | ▲0.3% | 98.92% | 180 | ▼21.7% | 0.44% | 95 | ▲11.8% | 0.18% | 285 | ▲83.9% | 0.55% |
| 2011 | 51,835 | 51,365 | ▲2.7% | 99.09% | 230 | ▲24.3% | 0.44% | 85 | ▲88.9% | 0.16% | 155 | ▼61.3% | 0.30% |
| 2006 | 50,630 | 50,000 | ▼1.0% | 98.76% | 185 | ▼15.9% | 0.37% | 45 | ▼59.1% | 0.08% | 400 | ▲247.8% | 0.79% |
| 2001 | 50,935 | 50,490 | ▼1.6% | 99.13% | 220 | ▲12.8% | 0.43% | 110 | ▲29.4% | 0.22% | 115 | ▲21.1% | 0.23% |
| 1996 | 51,685 | 51,310 | n/a | 99.27% | 195 | n/a | 0.38% | 85 | n/a | 0.16% | 95 | n/a | 0.18% |

== Transportation ==
=== Access Routes ===
Highways and numbered routes that run through the municipality, including external routes that start or finish at the county border:

Autoroutes

- None

Principal Highways

- R-169
- R-170
- R-172

Secondary Highways

- None

External Routes

- None

== See also ==
- List of regional county municipalities and equivalent territories in Quebec
