= La Baie =

Borough of Saguenay, Quebec, Canada

- Borough
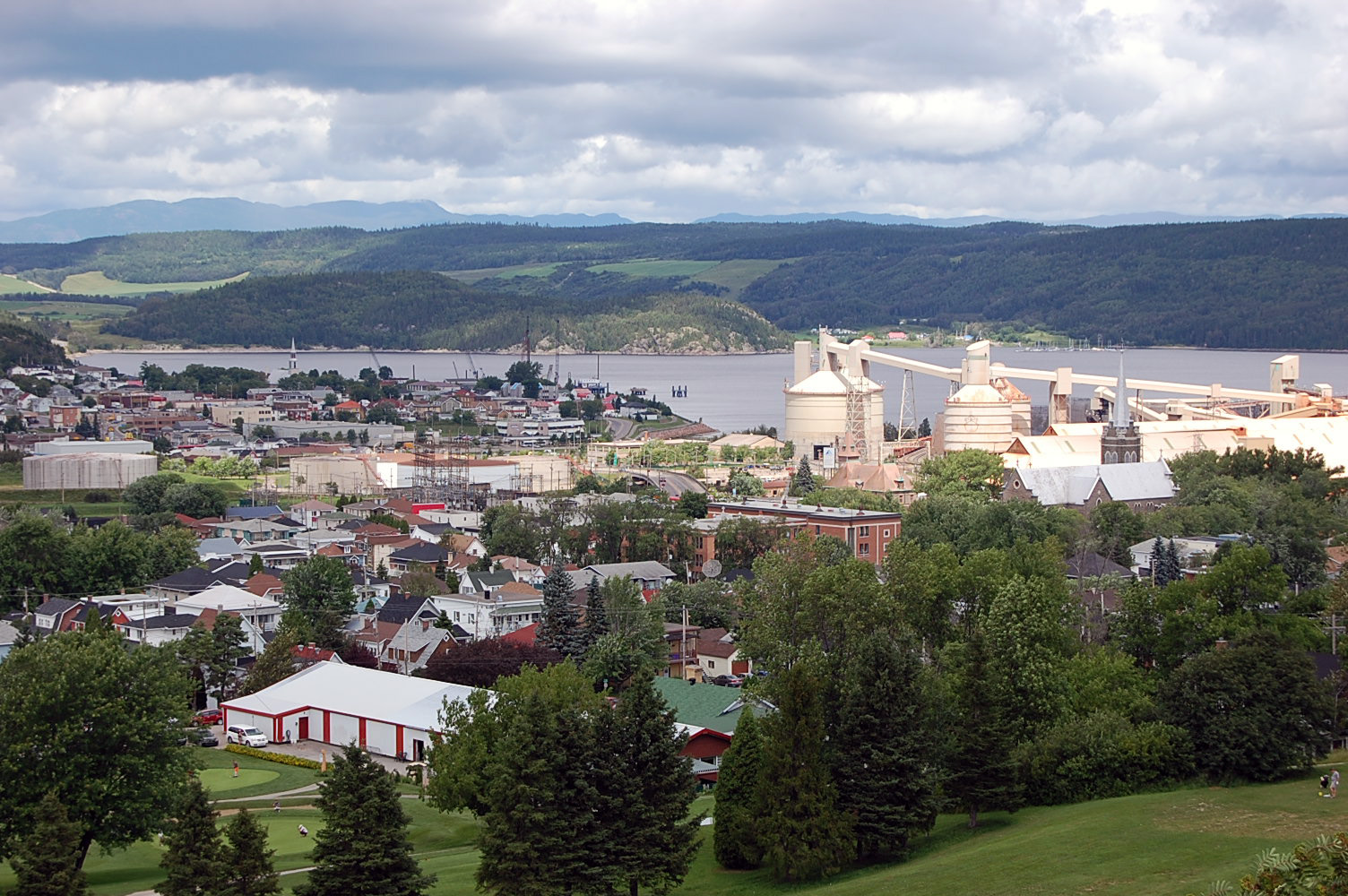
- Borough of La Baie (in blue) in the City of Saguenay

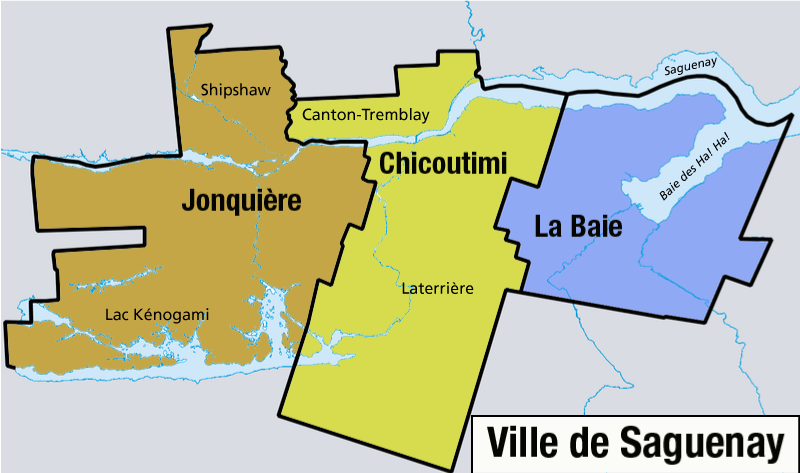
- Coordinates: 48°25′42″N 71°03′44″W
- Country: Canada
- Province: Quebec
- Region: Saguenay–Lac-Saint-Jean
- City: Saguenay

Government
  - Borough president: Éric Simard

Area
  - Total: 262.66 km^{2} (101.41 sq mi)

Population (2006)
  - Total: 19,639
  - Density: 74.770/km^{2} (193.65/sq mi)
- Time zone: UTC−5 (Eastern)
  - Summer (DST): UTC−4 (EDT)
- Area codes: 367/418/581
- Website: La Baie

La Baie (French pronunciation: [la bɛ], locally [la be]) is one of three boroughs in the city of Saguenay, Quebec, Canada. It was created during Quebec's municipal reorganization in 2002. From 1976 to 2001, it was known as the Town of La Baie, a municipality composed of the Grande-Baie, Bagotville and Port-Alfred sectors.

It is located on the bank of the Ha! Ha! Bay (French: baie des Ha! Ha!) at the mouths of the Ha! Ha! River (French: rivière Ha! Ha!) and the Mars River (French: rivière à Mars). La Baie was the first colony built in the Saguenay-Lac-St-Jean region. It was founded by the Société des Vingt et un who settled the area in 1838. The depth of the banks of the Ha! Ha! Bay's waterways facilitated the rapid development of the region's largest harbour facilities after the railways were built in 1910.

The borough's main sources of socio-economic development have been the logging and the pulp and paper industries since the nineteenth and twentieth centuries respectively. Aluminum production began in the early 1980s. After the Abitibi-Consolidated paper mill, one of the main employers of the borough, shut down in 2004, Saguenay's elected officials decided to invest in La Baie's tourism industry by building and operating a port of call for cruise ships in 2008.

Bagotville Airport, the main civilian airport in Saguenay-Lac-St-Jean, is also located in La Baie. The Canadian Forces Base Bagotville, which shares the same airfield, is one of only two Canadian military bases that use the Royal Canadian Air Force's CF-18 fighters. The military base is the borough's largest employer.

While Chicoutimi and Jonquière, the two boroughs that constitute the main urban core of Saguenay, are located close to each other, La Baie is at a moderate distance from the city centre. This has created some unique issues for the borough — for example, while a full-power television or radio station in Saguenay can serve the entire city from a single transmitter without difficulty, La Baie is distant enough from the city's urban core that some low-power broadcasters, such as CKAJ-FM, have had to add separate transmitters to rebroadcast their signals in La Baie.

== History ==
=== Exploration of Ha! Ha! Bay ===
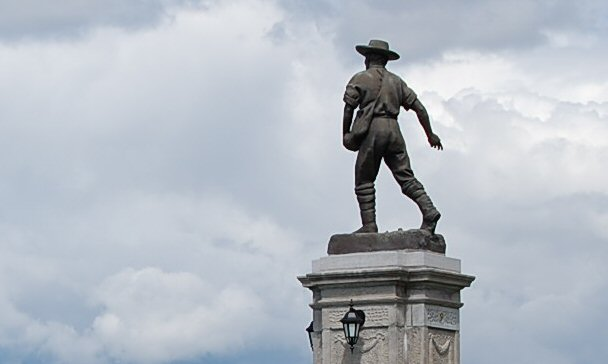
A monument dedicated to the Société des vingt et un

The Saguenay's nomadic Innu tribes once inhabited La Baie. The Chicoutimians lived on the banks of the Saguenay River well before European colonization. Unlike important meeting places like Chicoutimi, Ha! Ha! Bay was far from portages to Saint-Jean Lake (French: lac St-Jean) and was not frequented by First Nations or the region's first explorers.

Although it was not on eighteenth century fur trade routes, Ha! Ha! Bay was used by the Hudson's Bay Company's commercial fishing boats at the mouths of the Ha! Ha! (Wissuscoué) and Mars (Vasigamenke) Rivers.

In 1828, the Crown mandated land surveyor J.-B. Proulx to explore the bay area; he later reported on its hilly landscapes and logging potential. Colonization was impossible during this period since the Hudson's Bay Company held exclusive rights to natural resources in the region since 1821, a monopoly which would only expire in 1842. It was popular pressure from Charlevoix and especially La Malbaie that led to the tenuous beginnings of colonization in the Saguenay region. After an 1829 report demonstrating the fertility levels of the region's soil, a petition asking for permission to settle the Saguenay region began to circulate in La Malbaie. The government refused it and ordered further explorations of the region between 1829 and 1836, hoping to find a land link between Ha! Ha! Bay and Baie-Saint-Paul. A second petition was launched in 1835, which led to the government and the Hudson's Bay Company to finally cede cutting rights to a company from La Malbaie called the Société des Vingt et un.

The company's schooner sailed from La Malbaie on April 25, 1838, and made several stopovers along the banks of the Saguenay. After setting up temporary camps near Tadoussac, they built their first sawmill at L'Anse St-Jean. Their goal was to reach Ha! Ha! Bay to build a permanent facility.

=== Bagot Township and the evolution of Grande-Baie and Bagotville ===
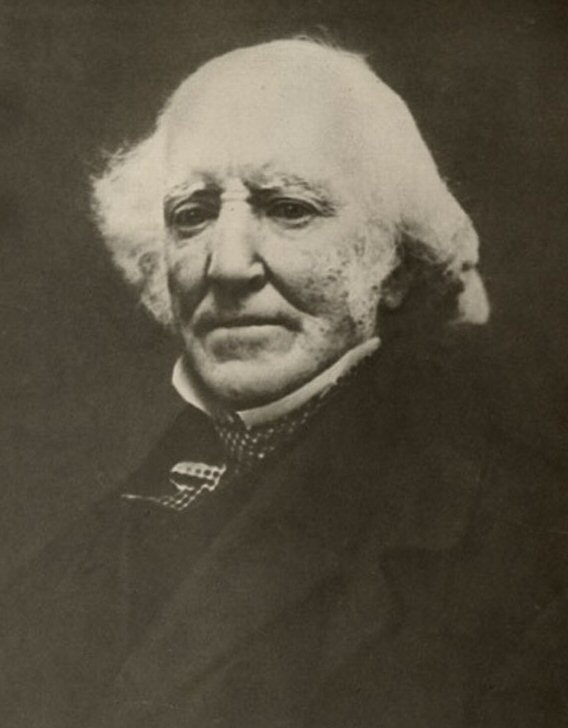
The "King of Wood" William Price

The Société des vingt et un arrived in what is now the Grande-Baie sector on June 11, 1838. After surveying the forest and assessing its potential, the colonists built the first lock on the Ha! Ha! River. In October of that same year, they completed the first sawmill and created the foundation of what would become Grande-Baie. The first families arrived during the fall, and jack pine and Eastern white pine logging operations began in 1839. The hydraulic power of the two main rivers, Ha! Ha! and Mars, and the bay's tributaries was used to run several sawmills. Mars Simard, a resident of Baie-Saint-Paul, opened his own sawmill on the Mars River and founded Bagotville, the bay's second settlement. Colonists from Baie-Saint-Paul moved to the new outpost, while those from La Malbaie preferred Grande-Baie, which had 110 inhabitants in 1839.

The Société des Vingt et un began to struggle after it lost two years worth of cutting when log-booms breached in 1840 and 1841. Their main purchaser, an English wood merchant named William Price, acquired all of the company's shares in 1842. He also bought the Mars Simard sawmill in 1843, making Price the owner of every sawmill in lower Saguenay.

The end of the Hudson's Bay Company's exclusive lease allowed the lawful colonization of the Saguenay region to begin. The territory organized itself independently and Jean-Baptiste Duberg was mandated to survey land for the new Bagot Township (named after Sir Charles Bagot) and divide county seats for the new constituency. Duberg was also responsible for mapping a road to Chicoutimi during the summer of 1842, which would eventually become Saint-Jean-Baptiste Boulevard and Grande-Baie Nord Boulevard.

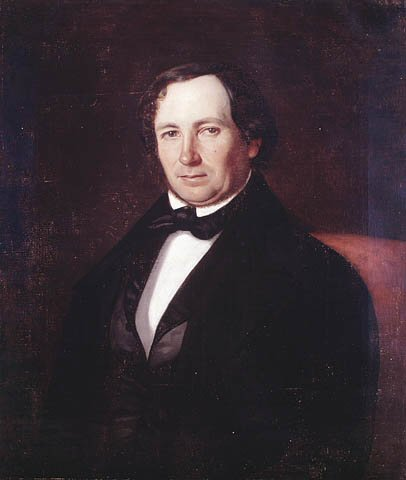
John Kane, the Bagot Township's first mayor

The Bagot Township was structurally unique since its population was concentrated in two areas: Bagot Village (Grande-Baie) and Bagot Town (Bagotville). John Kane, a land agent originally sent by the government to collect fees for use of Crown lands, became the township's first mayor in 1850. The Province of Canada created the counties of Tadoussac and Chicoutimi in 1844.

The region's first school was built between the Ha! Ha! and Mars Rivers to serve the bay's two population hubs. The clergy began to register the population of Grande-Baie in 1842 and Bagotville in 1845. On October 15, 1844, the Oblates arrived in Grande-Baie to found a mission. A fire destroyed most of the township in 1846. The parishes of Saint-Alexis-de-Grande-Baie and Saint-Alphonse-de-Bagotville were canonically erected in 1857 and 1861 respectively. In 1851, the population around Ha! Ha! Bay reached 2,438; they mostly depended on logging and agriculture for their livelihoods.

Grande-Baie built its first post office in 1855, and was proclaimed a municipality in 1860. Bagotville became incorporated in 1876 and Grande-Baie followed suit in 1908. Agriculture began to develop rapidly during the 1850s and focused mainly on cereal production. The blueberry harvest was also an important activity until the arrival of railways in Chambord near St-Jean Lake in 1888.

An economic downturn occurred during this period and demand decreased for Saguenay timber. In 1856, there were twenty-six small sawmills around the bay, in addition to the main ones on the Ha! Ha! and Mars Rivers. The slowdown during the 1870s led many mills to shut down or convert from pine to spruce. Even though the logging industry experienced difficulties, the dairy industry flourished; by 1894, the number of cheese factories had increased to six.

St-Urbain Road was opened in 1870 and connected Grande-Baie to Baie-Saint-Paul. Telegraphs linked the two towns in 1880. In 1859, the first jetty was built on Ha! Ha! Bay in Bagotville. Three years later its first quay was built, which was later purchased by the Canadian government in 1876. Bagotville's marine facilities, which were mainly used by Canada Steamship Lines, added a shipyard in 1853.

=== Industrialization of Port-Alfred and the development from 1900 to 1976 ===
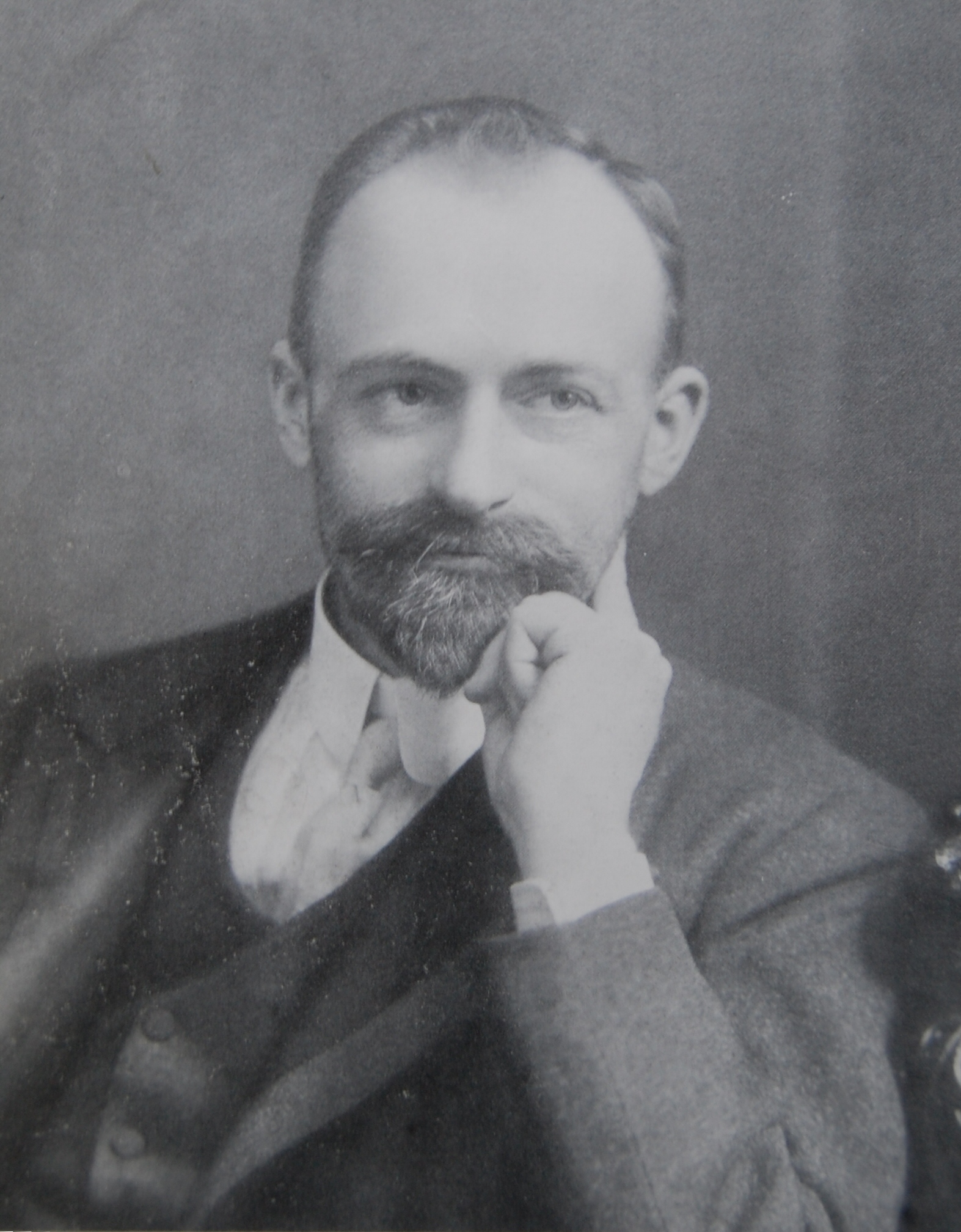
Businessman and politician Julien-Édouard-Alfred Dubuc

The Saguenay region experienced a new phase of economic development after the arrival of railways in Chicoutimi in 1893. Journalist Joseph-Dominique Guay and banker Julien-Édouard-Alfred Dubuc founded the Compagnie de Pulpe de Chicoutimi in 1898. Because its activities soon became too extensive for Chicoutimi's port facilities, the company's directors decided to build a loading port on the Ha! Ha! Bay to ship pulp. The Ha! Ha! Bay railway was built in 1909 to facilitate transport to the quay in Bagotville. The first train shipment was on December 13, 1910.

Some sawmills had difficulty staying afloat before the arrival of large industry. Price Sawmills, the largest on both the Ha! Ha! and Mars Rivers, closed their doors in 1904 and 1912 respectively. However, other sectors of the forest industry were booming. From 1902 to 1913, the Battle Island Company operated a pulp debarking factory in Anse-à-Benjamin.

Several municipal infrastructure projects were built in the 1910s. Bagotville's first water system was completed in 1913. Soon macadam was used to pave the roads around Bagotville's Saint-Alphonse Church. In 1915, the municipal council adopted a by-law that implemented the use of electric lights. Highway 381 was opened that same year.

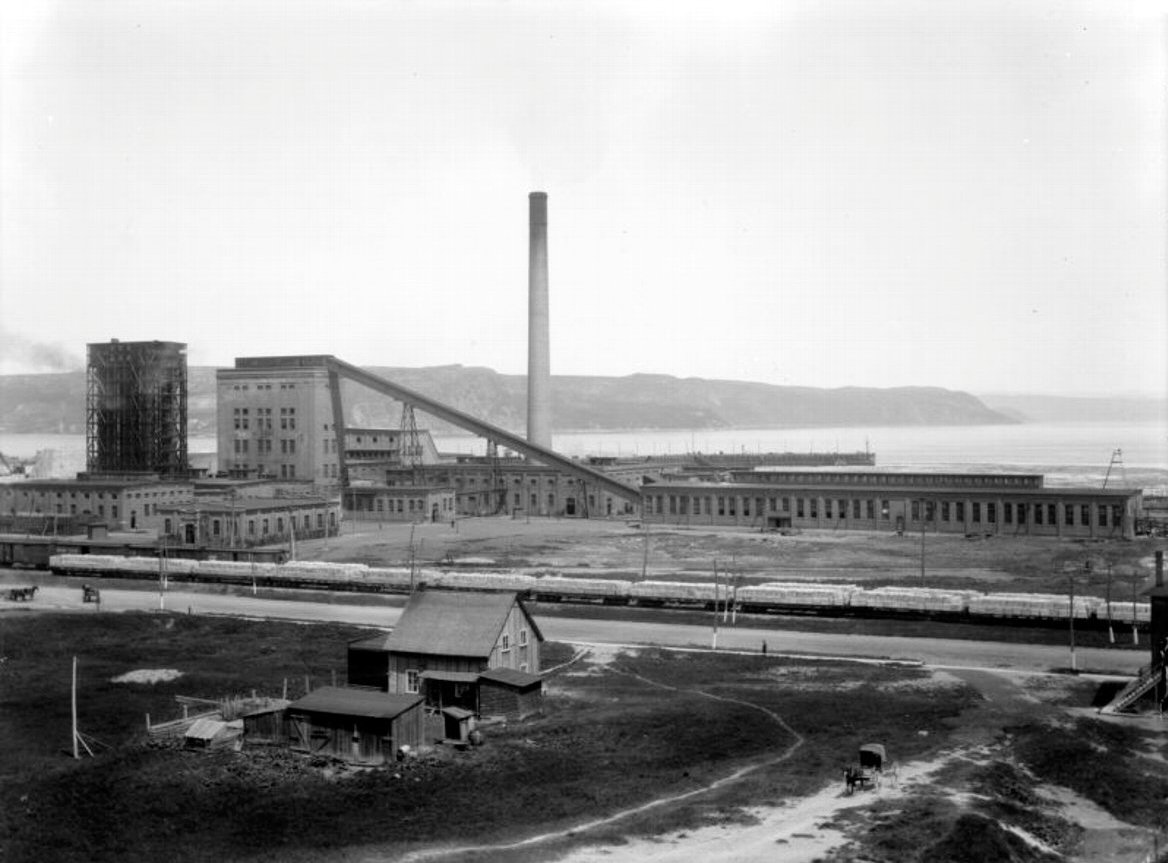
The Compagnie de Pulpe de Chicoutimi's Ha! Ha! Bay Sulphite plant, Port-Alfred, 1918

Plans for a chemical pulp plant on Ha! Ha! Bay were drawn up by the Compagnie de Pulpe de Chicoutimi in 1914. The company's director, J.-É.-A. Dubuc, travelled to Europe to attract capital. Although he found investors in England, the volatility caused by World War I delayed investment until 1916. Ha! Ha! Bay Sulphite Company Limited was founded that very year to make the chemical pulp plant a reality. Two hydroelectric power stations were built on the Ha! Ha! River to supply the plant. In 1917, the company purchased two lots from Grande-Baie totalling five square kilometres. Construction of the Port-Alfred plant began on June 12, 1916, and was completed August 30, 1917. On December 4 of that same year, the Saint-Édouard Parish was founded in Port-Alfred just prior to a formal request to separate the plant's land from Grande-Baie on December 29.

The plant began operating on April 18, 1918. Four days later, the village of Port-Alfred was founded. In 1918, Bagotville organized its own police force. Industrialization, urbanization, and the construction of over fifty homes in Port-Alfred officially changed the new village's status and it became Ha! Ha! Bay's first town on September 5, 1919. Bagotville obtained the same status on January 7, 1920.

Since the beginning of the 1910s, the bay area's population had doubled to 6,600 by 1921. Meanwhile, the pulp and paper industry suffered a crisis of overproduction, leading to the rapid bankruptcy of the Compagnie de Pulpe de Chicoutimi and the disposal of the Ha! Ha! Bay Sulfite Company on June 30, 1922. It was succeeded by the Bay Sulfites Company Limited, which was also disposed in 1923.

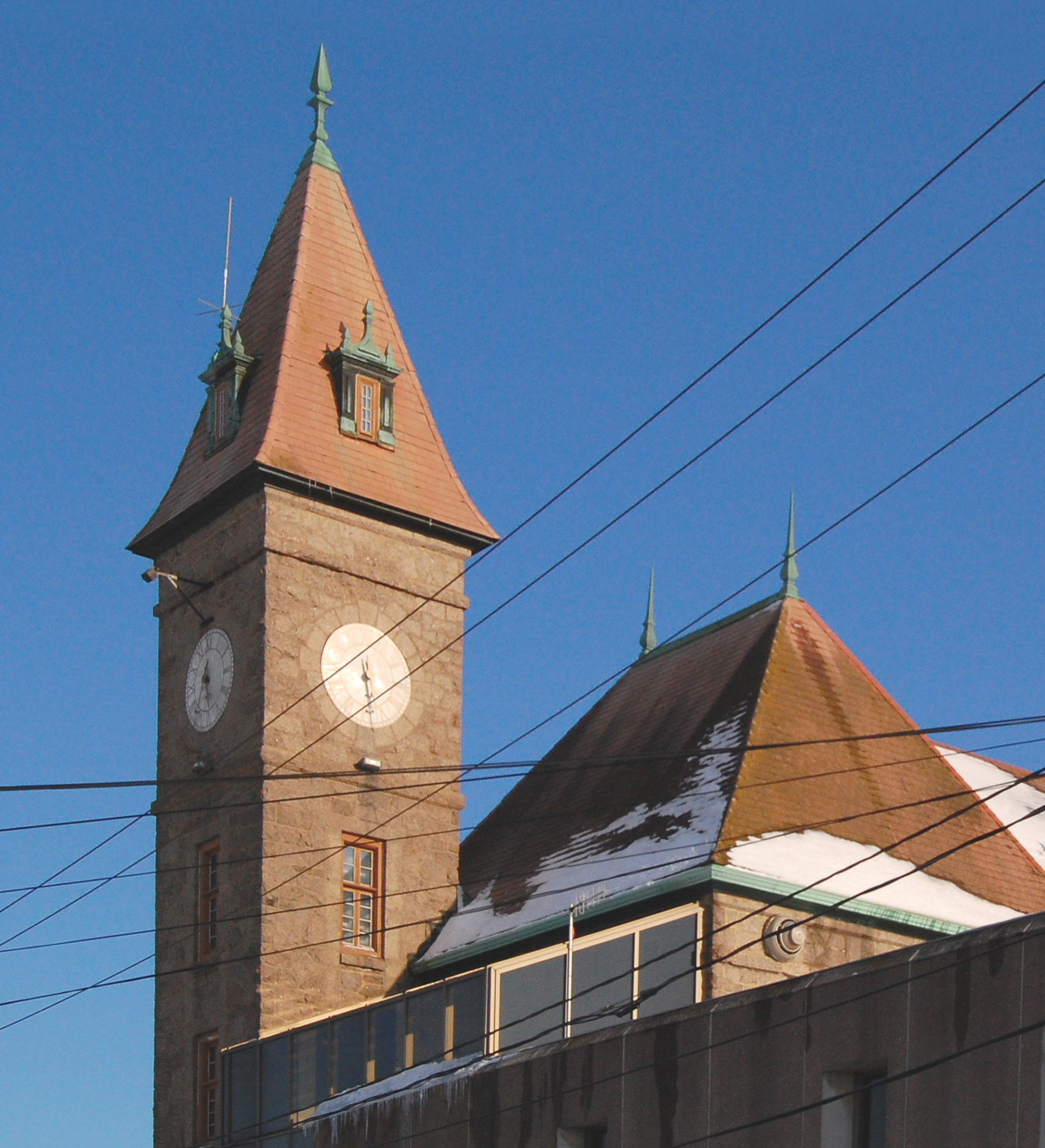
The old Port-Alfred Town Hall, which was built during the Great Depression

On July 26, 1924, the Port-Alfred Pulp and Paper Corporation acquired the plant and began converting its production from chemical to paper pulp in 1925. Alcan purchased Port-Alfred's port and rail facilities in 1926 after the disposal of the Compagnie de Pulpe de Chicoutimi. The docks were converted so they could load bauxite for the new aluminum smelter in Arvida.

The community continued to grow despite the economic difficulties of the Canadian pulp and paper industry in 1928. Canada Power and Paper Corporation acquired the Port-Alfred mill and suspended its activities on October 31, 1930. In 1927, the increasing population led to the opening of new schools in Port-Alfred such as the Bagotville Boys' Academy (French: Académie des garçons de Bagotville) and the Saint-Édouard College (French: Collège Saint-Édouard). The newly created Consolidated Paper Corporation bought the Port-Alfred paper mill on August 28, 1930, and reopened it on June 8, 1932. The mill was closed again from 1933 to 1934, which was followed by seventy years of stability. Another forest industry company, the Scieries Saguenay, opened a plant in Bagotville in 1935.

The Great Depression led to the construction of public works like the Port-Alfred and Bagotville Town Halls. Many bay area residents turned to agriculture during this period of economic uncertainty. Credit unions were established in Grande-Baie in 1927, Port-Alfred in 1933, and Bagotville in 1936. In addition to the maritime traffic in Alcan's Port-Alfred port facilities, Bagotville's quay became Canada Steamship Lines' water terminal in the Saguenay region from 1930 to 1938.

During the Second World War, the Canadian government and the Allies trained pilots and built several bases including one in Bagotville in 1942. The base was responsible for training pilots and protecting the Arvida aluminum smelter and the regions' dams until October 1944. The base was shut down in 1945. In 1945, Bagotville's civilian airport was run by Canadian Pacific Air Lines.

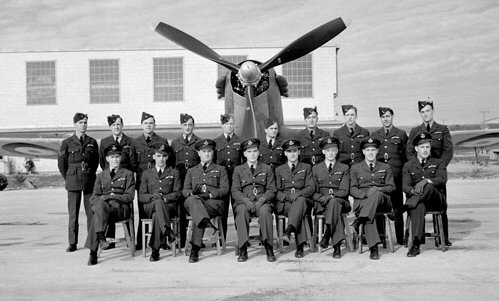
110th Royal Canadian Air Force Squadron, Bagotville, 1942

From 1946 onward, new services such as public transportation linked Ha! Ha! Bay communities from the Bagotville terminal. The Voice of La Baie (French: La Voix de la Baie) newspaper began publication in 1948. The uneven expansion and development of the bay's three urban centres and two rural sectors led to the first municipal mergers in 1953. The Village of Grande-Baie was absorbed by Port-Alfred. That same year, the new Saint-Marc-de-Bagotville Parish was established in Bagotville. Nearly a decade later, Notre-Dame-de-La-Baie Parish was founded in Port-Alfred in 1967. The Ha! Ha! Bay Hospital (French: Hôpital de la baie des Ha! Ha!) opened its doors in 1970.

The Cold War led to the reopening of the Bagotville military base in July 1951. Four chase squadrons were stationed there, including the 413th and 414th until 1953, the 440th until 1957, and the 432nd until 1961. Their mission was to intercept any intrusion in the Canadian northeast. In 1962, the 425th squadron was stationed in Bagotville with CF-101 Voodoo interceptors. It was responsible for protecting the 22nd NORAD. In 1958, Air Canada and Québec Air began scheduling flights from Bagotville Airport.

Municipal mergers in the Ha! Ha! Bay became an increasingly pressing issue and was the most important intermunicipal political debate of the 1960s. Bagotville and Port-Alfred's mayors, Hervé Tremblay and Laurier Simard, strongly opposed each other on the issue. It was ultimately the Quebec government that forced the merger in 1974 with the Act Concerning Certain Outaouais and Upper Saguenay Municipalities (French: Loi concernant certaines municipalités de l'Outaouais et du Haut-Saguenay). The letters patent were issued December 10, 1975, for the merger on January 1, 1976.

=== Town of La Baie (1976–2001) ===
The former Town of La Baie's logo

The Town of La Baie was founded on January 1, 1976. It was the result of the merger of the Towns of Bagotville and Port-Alfred and the Parish Municipalities of Grande-Baie and Bagotville. Since the first municipal elections were only scheduled for November 1977, a temporary municipal council was appointed. The leaders of the merged municipalities sat on an administrative council; city hall alternated between the mayors of Bagotville and Port-Alfred. After the 1977 elections, Laurier Simard, the former mayor of Port-Alfred, became the Town of La Baie's first mayor.

The Grande-Baie aluminum smelter was built between 1977 and 1982. Alcan spent nearly a billion dollars building the plant that opened on September 15, 1981. The Saguenay Fjord National Park was created in 1983 to open the Saguenay Fjord to tourists. That same year, the relocation of the Port of Chicoutimi to Grande-Anse began, moving the port from Ha! Ha! Bay to the Saguenay River. The Grande-Anse Maritime Terminal was inaugurated in October 1986. The Bagotville military base put its first CF-18s in operation in December 1984. These planes replaced the CF-101 Voodoos that had been used since the 1960s.

For La Baie's celebrations of the 150th anniversary of the first colony in Grande-Baie, the Théâtre du Palais municipal presented the first season of the historical extravaganza called The Amazing History of a Kingdom (French: La Fabuleuse Histoire d'un royaume). On November 25 of that same year, Quebec was hit by the Saguenay earthquake, measuring 6.25 on the Richter magnitude scale.

==== Saguenay Flood ====
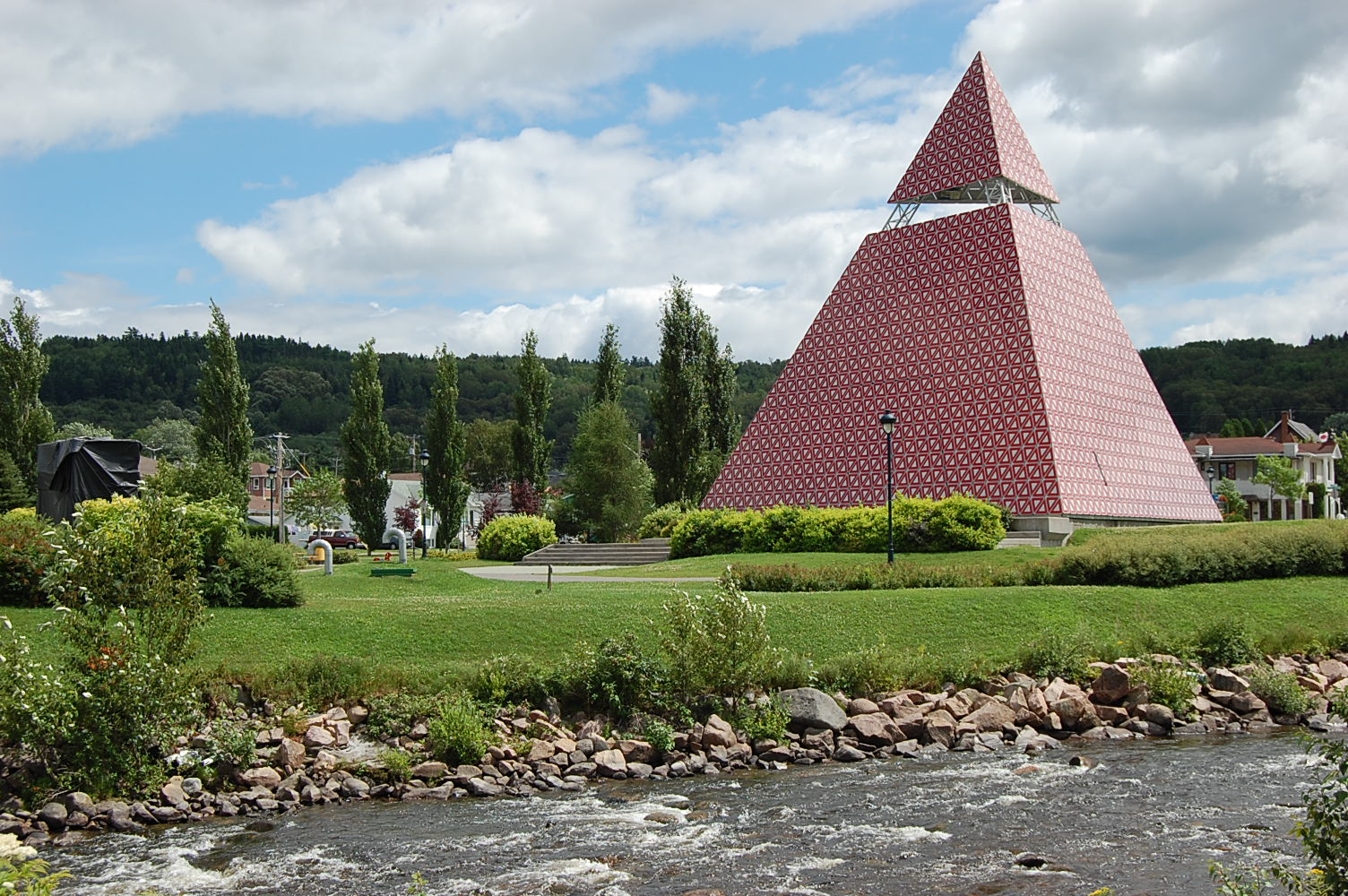
The Ha! Ha! Pyramid, a monument commemorating the 1996 Saguenay Flood

From July 18 to 21, 1996, a major depression resulted in 260 mm of rain falling within a fifty-hour period on the Laurentian Wildlife Reserve and the Saguenay-Lac-Saint-Jean region. The soil, which was already oversaturated after a particularly rainy month, could not absorb the excess water from the Saguenay River's drainage basins. The heavy rainfall rapidly increased the discharge from the Ha! Ha! Bay's tributaries' river basins and other Saguenay waterways. The first signs of disaster appeared on the night of July 18 to 19. Land erosion caused a house in Grande-Baie to be ripped apart and sewers located near the banks of the Ha! Ha! River began to back up. The Ha! Ha! and Mars Rivers' discharges quickly became dangerous and blocked access to the bridges that crossed them. The situation was at its lowest point when a dam on Ha! Ha! Lake ruptured and washed away central Grande-Baie.

La Baie, and especially the Grande-Baie sector, was the town that was the most heavily hit by the Saguenay Flood. Fifty million dollars were required to rebuild public infrastructure and an additional thirty million were needed to stabilize the Ha! Ha! and Mars riverbanks. The railways were heavily damaged, which paralyzed the city's economy, cut off drinking water supplies, and isolated areas east of the Mars River. Transportation to lower Saguenay was impossible, leaving sectors of Port-Alfred and Grande-Baie completely isolated.

Reconstruction of the Grande-Baie sector and the development of the commemorative Ha! Ha! Park began in 1997. The Ha! Ha! Pyramid was built in 1998 and officially inaugurated in 2000.

Uniboard built the Panneaux MDF La Baie Inc. plant in 1997, which made medium-density fibreboard out of wood residue. In 2001, rumours about the Abitibi-Consolidated mill in Port-Alfred shutting down began to surface after eighty-nine people were laid off.

As 2002 approached, the Town of La Baie began opposing the Quebec government's plan for municipal mergers after the Department of Municipal Affairs published a white paper called Municipal Reorganization: Changing the Way We Do Things to Better Serve Citizens (French: La Réorganisation municipale: changer les façons de faire pour mieux server les citoyens) on April 25, 2000. Some of La Baie's elected officials expressed opposition to the imminent municipal mergers in the Saguenay region by joining Laterrière in refusing to sit on transition committees. Despite this, the mergers were officialized and the November 25, 2001, municipal elections for borough representatives were held for the new city of Saguenay.

=== City of Saguenay and the La Baie Borough ===
City of Saguenay logo

La Baie was merged into the City of Saguenay on January 1, 2002.

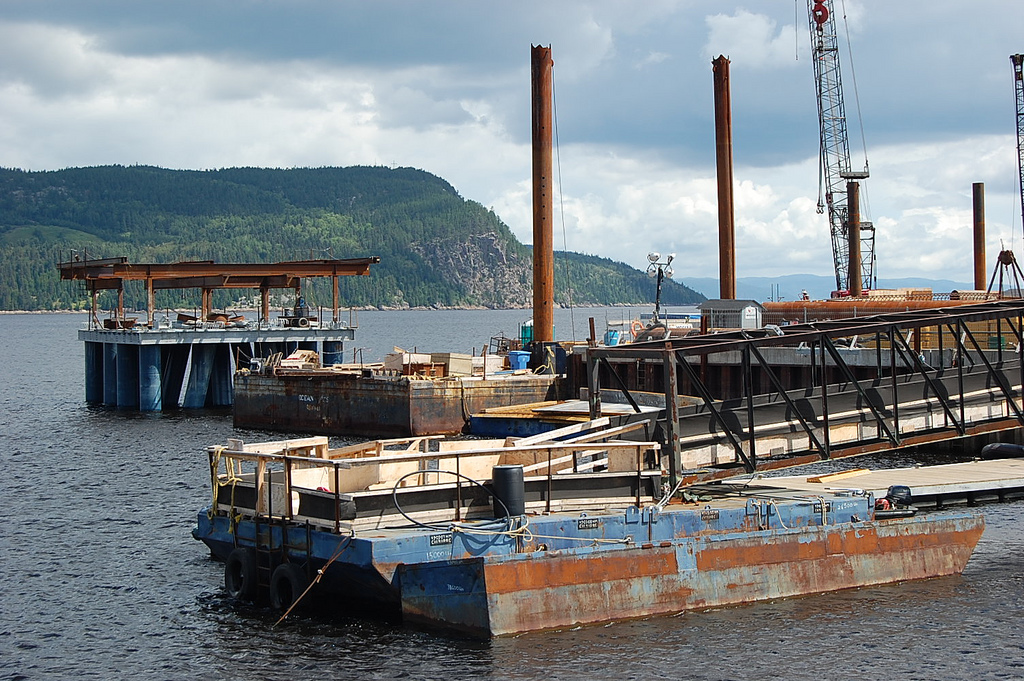
Construction of the A-Lepage Quay's port of call

Despite everything that was proposed and done to keep the Abitibi-Consolidated mill open in Port-Alfred, it was temporarily shut down on December 10, 2003, as part of a major restructuring plan. It was officially closed on January 26, 2004; 640 jobs were lost. Having learnt from its difficult and costly experience while trying to save the Gaspésia paper mill, the Quebec government withdrew from plans to reopen the plant in 2005. The mill was demolished in 2006.

Two years after the mergers, the Quebec government allowed merged municipalities to hold public consultations starting on May 16, 2004, to organize demerger referendums to be held on June 20, 2004. Although La Baie was the centre of demerger support in Saguenay at the time, demerger support was not widespread enough to affect the borough's status. By the May 21, 2004, deadline, only fifty of the required 1,502 signatures were missing to hold a referendum.

Since its creation in 2002, the City of Saguenay, Promotion Saguenay, and the Quebec government have worked together to increase tourism in the La Baie Borough by building port facilities for cruise ships. Originally, these groups had planned to develop Port-Alfred's Powell Quay and the Grande-Anse Maritime Terminal and set up a shuttle service. However, it was eventually Bagotville's Algélias-Lepage Quay that was selected for the installation of cruise ship facilities because of the shorter disembarkation distance and increased safety for the boat passengers. After the Office of Public Hearings on the Environment (French: Bureau d'audiences publiques sur l'environnement) held consultations, work began in August 2007 despite a small opposition movement to the project in 2006. The quay welcomed its first ships in September 2008.

== Geography ==
=== Territory ===
The urban core of the La Baie Borough

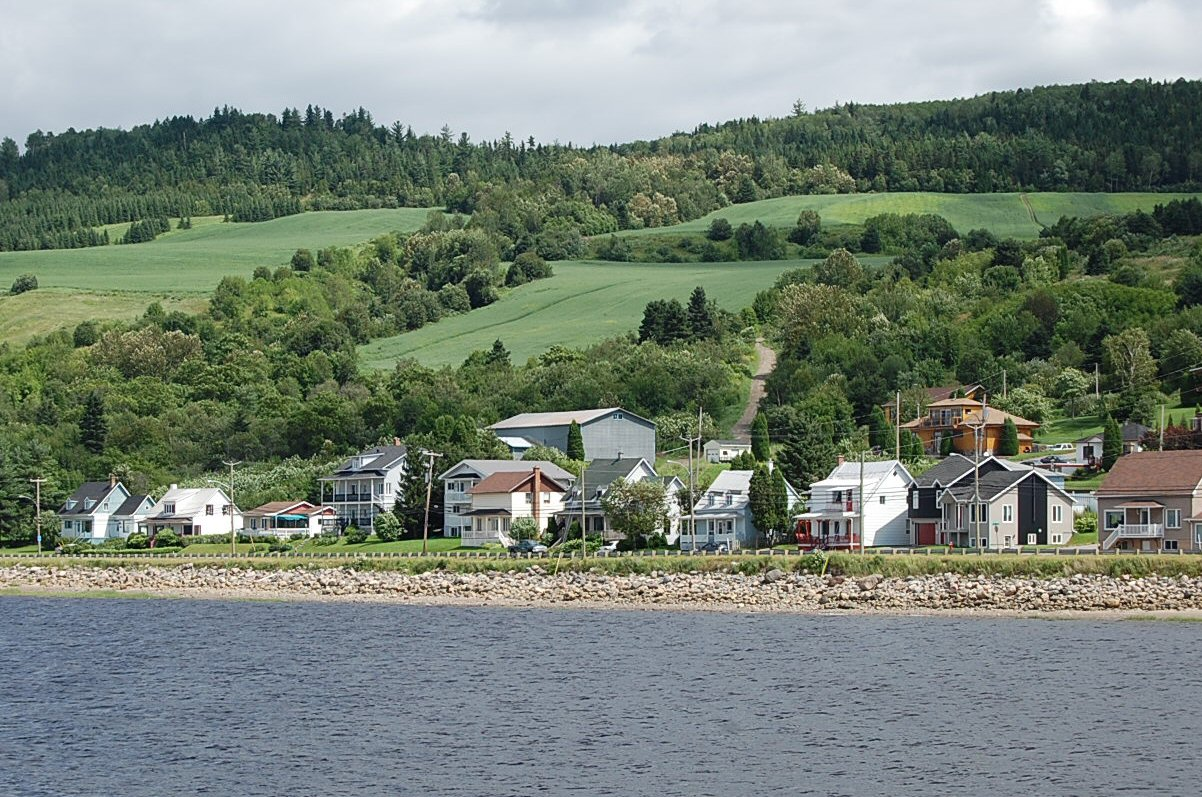
The southeast bank of Ha! Ha! Bay (Grande-Baie)

La Baie is located in the eastern part of the city of Saguenay. It lies between upper and lower Saguenay and surrounds Ha! Ha! Bay. The borough borders the Saguenay River to the north, Saint-Félix-d'Otis to the east, Ferland-et-Boilleau to the southeast, La Zec Mars-Moulin to the south, the Laterrière sector to the southwest, and the Chicoutimi Borough to the west.

La Baie is 262 km^{2} (101 sq mi) or 23% of Saguenay's total area. The urbanized zone is located on the mouths of the Ha! Ha! and Mars Rivers. Urbanized areas cover only a small part of the bay area and the neighbouring plateaus.

Like the Saguenay Fjord's steep relief, altitude rises sharply from the bay's shores, particularly on the northwest banks. Overlooking the bay, the Centennial Cross (French: Croix du centenaire) is 200 m (660 ft) from the shore and is located on the des Écorceurs Cove at an altitude of 170 m (560 ft). On the other side of the bay is Mount Bélu, which has an altitude of 200 m (660 ft). The town's outskirts stretch along a fluvial terrace down the Ha! Ha! and Mars Rivers toward Chicoutimi and Laterrière and go all the way to the Laurentians. The plateaus to the east and southeast are flat enough for both agriculture and large infrastructure such as the Bagotville Airport and the Grande-Baie aluminum smelter.

The borough's soil is clayey like much of the Saguenay region because of river-ice deposits in the ravines that face the bay. There are seventy-one scars from old landslides in the La Baie Borough's urban core.

=== Climate ===
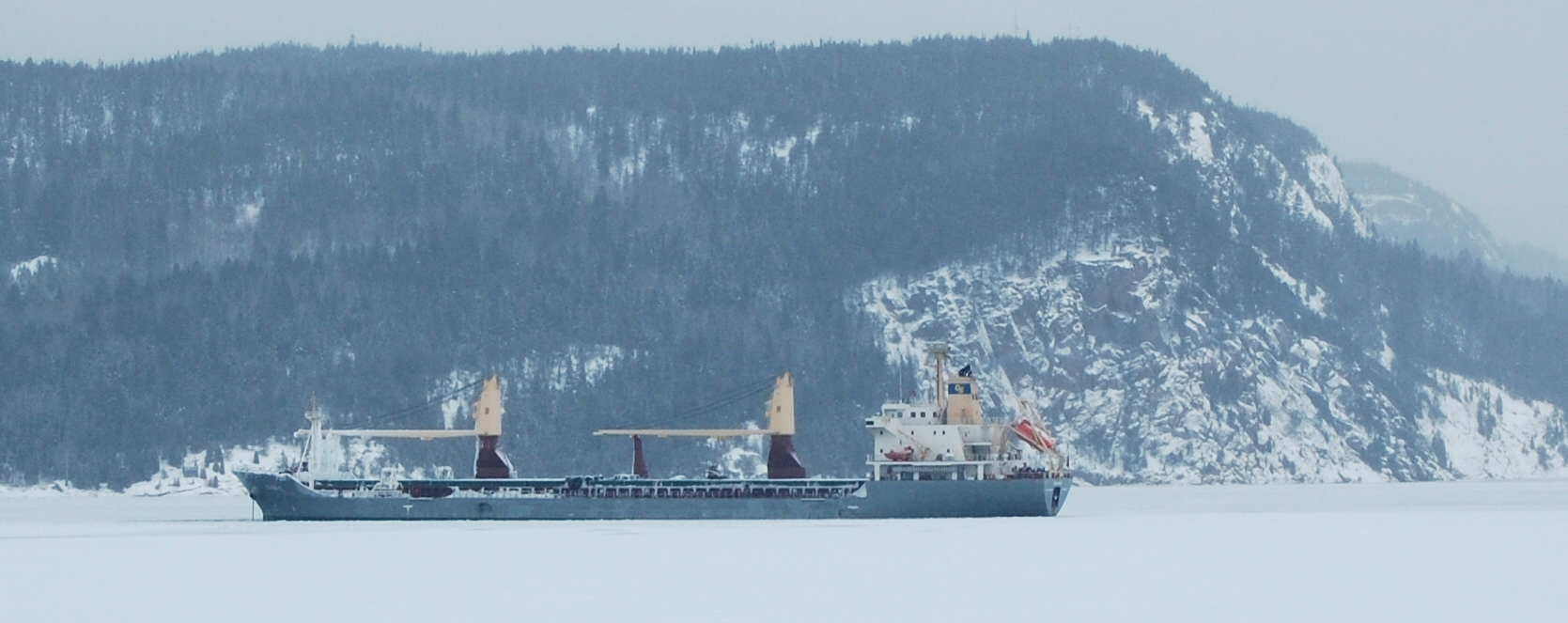
Ha! Ha! Bay and the des Écorceurs Bay in the wintertime

Like most cities alongside the Saguenay River and east of St-Jean Lake, La Baie has a continental climate that is milder than the surrounding Laurentian Plateau. La Baie has an average annual temperature of 2.3 °C (36.1 °F) with temperatures varying between −44 and 36 °C (−47 and 97 °F). Even though it is located on the same latitude as warmer European cities such as Paris or Vienna, La Baie has long, cold winters and short, mild summers.

The borough receives an average of 660 mm (26 in) of rain and 340 cm (130 in) of snow annually. July is the rainiest month while February is the driest. Skies are overcast 60 to 65% of the time; the borough has an average of 1,720 hours of sunshine per year.

During the winter, the average thickness of the ice on Ha! Ha! Bay is 75 cm (30 in). Icebreakers keep the Saguenay River open for ships until Port-Alfred, where tides can reach up to 6 m (20 ft).

Climate data for Bagotville, Quebec (1991–2020 normals, extremes 1942–present)
Month	Jan	Feb	Mar	Apr	May	Jun	Jul	Aug	Sep	Oct	Nov	Dec	Year
Record high humidex	14.7	13.4	21.1	31.0	40.6	43.2	43.9	43.2	40.8	30.7	25.5	12.9	43.9
Record high °C (°F)	15.2 (59.4)	13.6 (56.5)	25.2 (77.4)	30.4 (86.7)	34.4 (93.9)	36.3 (97.3)	38.4 (101.1)	36.1 (97.0)	33.3 (91.9)	28.3 (82.9)	23.6 (74.5)	14.4 (57.9)	38.4 (101.1)
Mean daily maximum °C (°F)	−9.7 (14.5)	−7.4 (18.7)	−0.7 (30.7)	7.4 (45.3)	16.6 (61.9)	22.3 (72.1)	24.5 (76.1)	23.4 (74.1)	18.2 (64.8)	9.9 (49.8)	2.3 (36.1)	−5.1 (22.8)	8.5 (47.2)
Daily mean °C (°F)	−15.1 (4.8)	−13.1 (8.4)	−6.3 (20.7)	2.1 (35.8)	10.2 (50.4)	16.0 (60.8)	18.7 (65.7)	17.6 (63.7)	12.6 (54.7)	5.7 (42.3)	−1.5 (29.3)	−9.5 (14.9)	3.1 (37.6)
Mean daily minimum °C (°F)	−20.4 (−4.7)	−18.7 (−1.7)	−11.8 (10.8)	−3.2 (26.2)	3.7 (38.7)	9.6 (49.3)	12.9 (55.2)	11.8 (53.2)	6.9 (44.4)	1.4 (34.5)	−5.4 (22.3)	−13.9 (7.0)	−2.3 (27.9)
Record low °C (°F)	−40.6 (−41.1)	−43.3 (−45.9)	−33.6 (−28.5)	−24.4 (−11.9)	−10.4 (13.3)	−2.6 (27.3)	0.9 (33.6)	0.8 (33.4)	−6.7 (19.9)	−12.2 (10.0)	−25.6 (−14.1)	−39.5 (−39.1)	−43.3 (−45.9)
Record low wind chill	−55.0	−54.8	−44.9	−34.3	−19.5	−7.2	1.7	−1.3	−9.6	−16.6	−32.9	−51.2	−55.0
Average precipitation mm (inches)	57.8 (2.28)	48.3 (1.90)	57.7 (2.27)	61.4 (2.42)	77.7 (3.06)	88.9 (3.50)	112.1 (4.41)	100.0 (3.94)	101.6 (4.00)	91.9 (3.62)	66.0 (2.60)	64.4 (2.54)	927.8 (36.54)
Average rainfall mm (inches)	6.5 (0.26)	5.7 (0.22)	13.8 (0.54)	39.9 (1.57)	77.6 (3.06)	88.0 (3.46)	111.8 (4.40)	91.2 (3.59)	102.6 (4.04)	77.0 (3.03)	37.8 (1.49)	11.8 (0.46)	663.7 (26.12)
Average snowfall cm (inches)	64.8 (25.5)	55.3 (21.8)	45.6 (18.0)	24.1 (9.5)	3.4 (1.3)	0.0 (0.0)	0.0 (0.0)	0.0 (0.0)	0.1 (0.0)	8.3 (3.3)	46.6 (18.3)	73.4 (28.9)	321.6 (126.6)
Average precipitation days (≥ 0.2 mm)	19.0	15.5	15.2	14.6	15.2	14.7	16.7	16.3	15.1	17.5	18.2	20.0	198.0
Average rainy days	1.7	1.7	3.7	9.8	14.8	14.9	16.6	15.5	16.1	15.4	8.6	3.2	122.1
Average snowy days (≥ 0.2 cm)	19.1	15.4	13.1	7.2	1.1	0.0	0.0	0.0	0.07	3.5	13.7	19.6	92.8
Average relative humidity (%)	75.4	72.9	64.5	55.3	48.2	50.6	56.0	56.3	60.7	65.9	76.5	79.1	63.5
Source: Environment Canada(rain/rain days, snow/snow days, humidex, wind chill, humidity 1981–2010)

== Demographics ==
Around Ville de La Baie

Year	Pop.	±%
1839	110	—
1851	2,438	+2116.4%
1861	3,142	+28.9%
1871	2,902	−7.6%
1881	3,328	+14.7%
1891	3,159	−5.1%
1901	2,787	−11.8%
1911	3,644	+30.7%
1921	6,599	+81.1%

Year	Pop.	±%
1931	8,201	+24.3%
1941	10,447	+27.4%
1951	13,096	+25.4%
1961	18,583	+41.9%
1971	19,801	+6.6%
1981	20,935	+5.7%
1991	20,995	+0.3%
2001	19,940	−5.0%
2006	19,639	−1.5%

Source: 1991-2006

The La Baie Borough is the fourth largest urban centre in Saguenay-Lac-Saint-Jean (after Chicoutimi, Jonquière, and Alma) with 7% of the region's total population. Over half of the region's population lived there before 1860. Upper Saguenay and Saint-Jean Lake were settled later and experienced much faster rates of population growth. The population of La Baie was soon surpassed by Chicoutimi, which eventually became the region's capital.

The La Baie Borough lost 6.5% of its population between 1991 and 2006. It experienced the largest demographic decline of the city of Saguenay; the entire city lost 4.4% of its population during the same period. Even though the Abitibi-Consolidated mill closed in 2003, the population decline has slowed since 2001. The population decreased by 5.3% from 1996 to 2001 and by 1.5% from 2001 to 2006. La Baie also contains the city's youngest families.

It is the most sparsely populated Saguenay borough with 75 inhabitants per km^{2}. According to the 2006 census, it had 19,639 inhabitants, 7,755 households, and 5,635 families. The most densely populated sector is Port-Alfred with 117.4 inhabitants per km^{2}.

According to Statistics Canada, 97.4% of the population is francophone and 0.7% of the population is anglophone. Immigrants make up less than 1% of the population.

In 2006, 9.9% of the population over the age of fifteen had a university diploma (bachelor's or higher), 38.8% had a CEGEP diploma, and 18.8% had a high school diploma. In 2001, 32.4% of the population over the age of fifteen had not completed high school, which is the highest percentage of all three of Saguenay's boroughs.

The average per capita income is $24,107. The average household income is $50,119. The sector with the highest per capita income is Grande-Baie at $28,319, and the sector with the lowest is Port-Alfred at $21,462.

"

Sociodemographic profile in 2006
Indicator:	La Baie	Saguenay (city)	Quebec
Men (%)	49.6	48.7	48.9
Women (%)	50.4	51.3	50.1
Median age	42.7	43.5	41.0
Population less than 15 years old (%)	15.9	15.2	16.6
Population 16 to 64 years (%)	69.9	69.4	69.1
Population 65 years and over (%)	14.2	15.4	14.3
Income per capita (CAD$)	24,107	23,288	24,430
Poverty rate (%)	10.5	14.5	17.2

== Borough ==
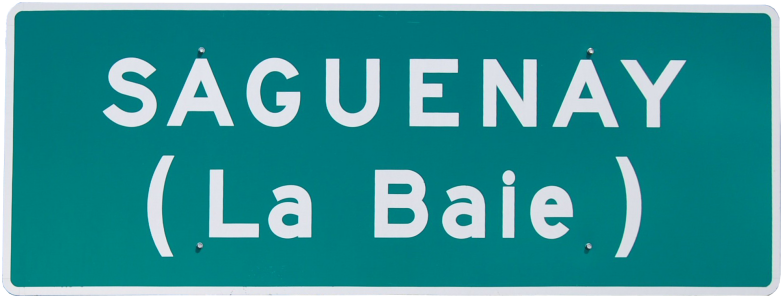
Since 2002, La Baie has been a borough of the City of Saguenay

The La Baie Borough, which was created on February 18, 2002, accounts for 3 of 19 electoral districts and 13.3% of the city's voters. It is governed by a borough council that elects a president who also serves as one of three municipal councillors. The borough's director and clerk of court hold the other two municipal council seats. Council meetings are held once a month and are open to the public. They are held at the La Baie Borough Office in the Bagotville sector, which once housed La Baie's town hall.

The La Baie Borough Council oversees urban planning, traffic flows, snow removal, the road system, firefighting, socioeconomic, community, and cultural development, parks, and recreation around the Ha! Ha! Bay.

City of Saguenay Mayor	Josée Néron
Borough President	Éric Simard
Municipal Councillor District 13	Raynald Simard
Municipal Councillor District 14	Éric Simard
Municipal Councillor District 15	Martin Harvey

=== Administrative history ===
==== Administrative history of Ha! Ha! Bay communities from colonization until today ====
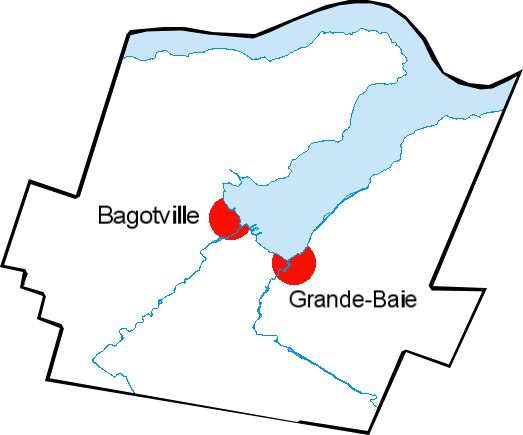
From 1837 Colonization was divided into two major areas: Grande-Baie and Bagotville.

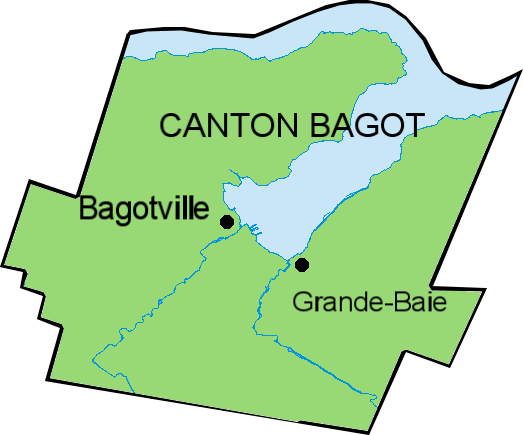
1855 Bagot Township was created; Grande-Baie became the county town and Bagotville was given a secondary status.

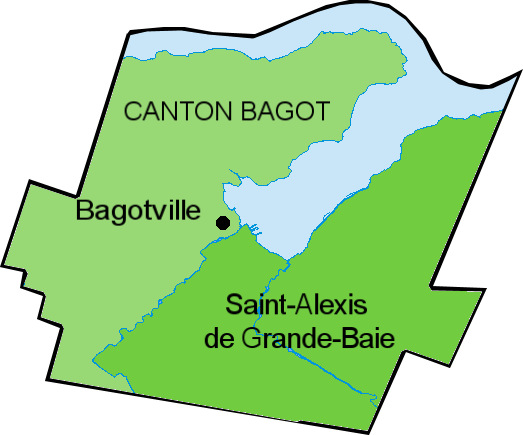
1860 The Saint-Alexis-de-Grande-Baie parish municipality was canonically erected; the Bagot Township was governed from Bagotville.

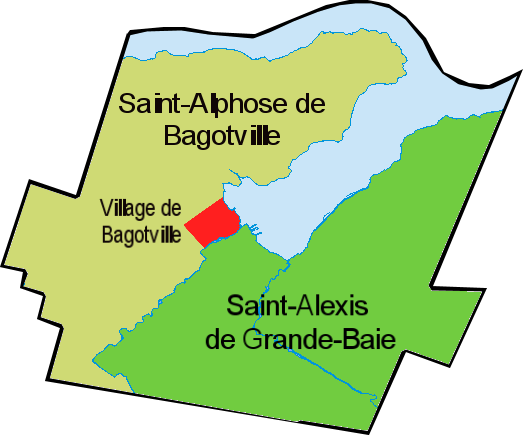
1876 Saint-Alphonse-de-Bagotville was canonically erected; Bagotville became a village.

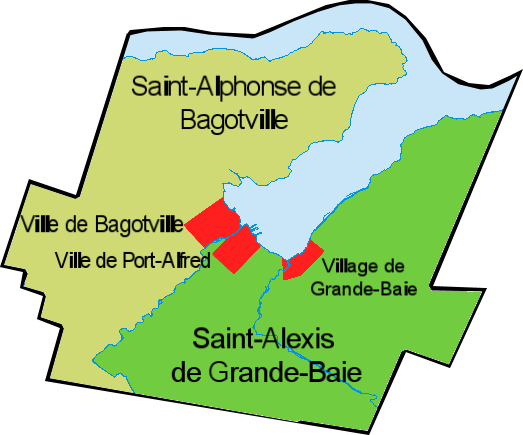
1908 Grande-Baie became a village.

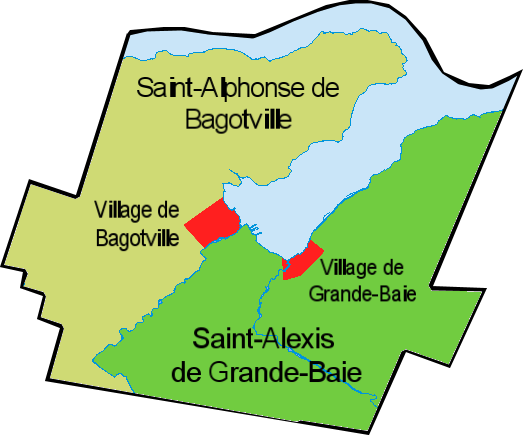
1917-1920 The Village of Port-Alfred was created within Grande-Baie's territory in 1917. Port-Alfred became a town in 1919 and Bagotville become one in 1920.

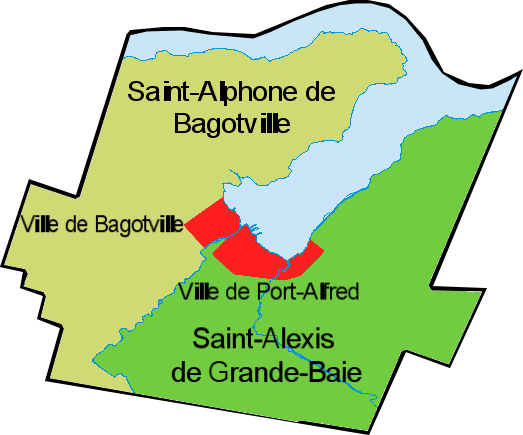
1953 The Town of Port-Alfred absorbed the Village of Grande-Baie.

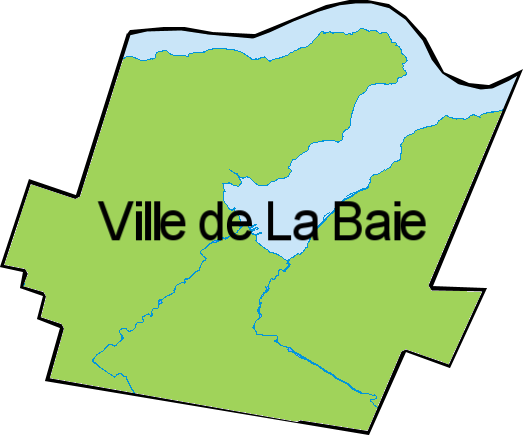
1976 The Towns of Port-Alfred and Bagotville and the Saint-Alphonse-de-Bagotville and Saint-Alexis-de-Grande-Baie parish municipalities merged and became the Town of La Baie.

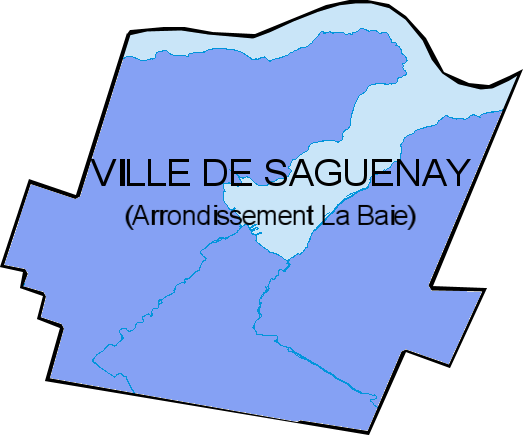
2002 The Town of La Baie became the City of Saguenay's La Baie Borough after the merger with Chicoutimi, Jonquière, Laterrière, Shipshaw, Lac-Kénogami, and Canton-Tremblay.

=== Mayors of La Baie since 1855 ===
Mayors of La Baie since 1855
Bagot Township (1855)
(1851–1860) John Kane
Bagot Township		Parish of Grande-Baie (1860)				
1859-1871 Abel Tremblay 1871-1872 Onésime Côté; 1872-1873 Thomas Tremblay; 1873-1875 J.-Aimé Gravel; 1875-1876 Abraham Tremblay		1860-1868 John Kane 1868-1870 Frédéric Fortin; 1870-1872 Louis-Joseph Forcade; 1872-1878 Philibert Gagnon; 1878-1881 Tite Dufour; 1881-1884 Louis-Didier Tremblay; 1884-1886 Johnny Savard; 1886-1889 Philippe Lavoie; 1889-1892 Auguste Lavoie; 1892-1893 Ernest Lavoie; 1893-1896 Louis Tremblay; 1896-1899 Johnny Savard; 1899-1903 L.-D. Tremblay; 1903-1908 Pitre Grenon				
Parish of Bagotville (1876)	Village of Bagotville (1876); Town of Bagotville (1920)	1860-1868 John Kane 1868-1870 Frédéric Fortin; 1870-1872 Louis-Joseph Forcade; 1872-1878 Philibert Gagnon; 1878-1881 Tite Dufour; 1881-1884 Louis-Didier Tremblay; 1884-1886 Johnny Savard; 1886-1889 Philippe Lavoie; 1889-1892 Auguste Lavoie; 1892-1893 Ernest Lavoie; 1893-1896 Louis Tremblay; 1896-1899 Johnny Savard; 1899-1903 L.-D. Tremblay; 1903-1908 Pitre Grenon				
1876-1878 Adolphe Tremblay 1878-1880 Omer Bouchard; 1880-1884 Gehu Perron; 1884-1885 Didyme Bouchard; 1885-1887 Pierre Paradis; 1887-1889 Joseph Bluteau; 1889-1892 Firmin Paradis; 1892-1898 Alfred Boivin; 1898-1907 Didyme Bouchard; 1907-1908 Pitre Gaudreault; 1908-1910 Herménégilde Girard; 1910-1913 Joseph Simard; 1913-1914 Xavier Villeneuve; 1914-1916 Philippe Simard; 1916-1917 Ben Maltais; 1917-1919 Alfred Boivin; 1919-1927 Xavier Bouchard; 1927-1933 Philippe Simard; 1933-1947 Alfred Tremblay; 1947-1955 Edouard Larouche; 1955-1957 Edgar Tremblay; 1957-1959 Louis-Joseph Simard; 1959-1962 Edgar Tremblay; 1962-1965 Anatole Simard; 1965-1968 Edgar Tremblay; 1969-1975 Jean-Baptiste Larouche	1876-1879 J.-Aimé Gravel 1879-1880 Alfred Potvin; 1880-1883 Onésime Côté; 1883-1888 J.-Aimé Gravel; 1888-1892 Elzéar Boivin; 1892-1893 Wilfrid Lévesque; 1893-1894 Wilfrid Côté; 1894-1896 Agésilas Lepage; 1896-1897 Pierre Chayer; 1897-1899 Abel Tremblay; 1899-1904 Wilfrid Côté; 1904-1905 Pitre Gauthier; 1905-1906 Hector Harvey; 1906-1908 J.-Emile Tremblay; 1908-1914 Wilfrid Lévesque; 1914-1916 Stanislas Minier; 1916-1917 Louis-Joseph Lévesque; 1917-1922 Pierre Chayer; 1922-1924 Odina Simard; 1924-1932 Louis-Joseph Lévesque; 1932-1933 Thomas-Louis Villeneuve; 1933-1937 Georges-Henri Lavoie; 1937-1939 J.-Louis Desbiens; 1939-1943 Georges-Henri Lavoie; 1943-1945 J.-Théo Tardif; 1945-1949 Georges-Henri Lavoie; 1949-1966 J.-C. Lévesque; 1966-1975 Hervé Tremblay	1860-1868 John Kane 1868-1870 Frédéric Fortin; 1870-1872 Louis-Joseph Forcade; 1872-1878 Philibert Gagnon; 1878-1881 Tite Dufour; 1881-1884 Louis-Didier Tremblay; 1884-1886 Johnny Savard; 1886-1889 Philippe Lavoie; 1889-1892 Auguste Lavoie; 1892-1893 Ernest Lavoie; 1893-1896 Louis Tremblay; 1896-1899 Johnny Savard; 1899-1903 L.-D. Tremblay; 1903-1908 Pitre Grenon				
		Village of Grande-Baie (1908)		Parish of Grande-Baie		
		ttt		1908-1914 Henry McNicoll 1914-1917 Omer Lavoie; 1917-1919 Johnny Lalancette; 1919-1925 Méridé Minier; 1925-1927 Johnny Lalancette; 1927-1935 Méridé Minier; 1935-1941 Philippe-Auguste Lavoie; 1941-1942 Georges Simard; 1942-1945 Joseph Dufour; 1945-1949 François Gagnon; 1949-1951 Joseph Dufour; 1951-1953 Liguori Bergeron; 1953-1956 Pierre-Alphonse Tremblay; 1956-1959 Adrien Simard; 1959-1968 Adrien Tremblay; 1968-1975 Adrien Simard		
		Village of Port-Alfred (1917); Town of Port-Alfred (1919)	Village of Grande-Baie	1908-1914 Henry McNicoll 1914-1917 Omer Lavoie; 1917-1919 Johnny Lalancette; 1919-1925 Méridé Minier; 1925-1927 Johnny Lalancette; 1927-1935 Méridé Minier; 1935-1941 Philippe-Auguste Lavoie; 1941-1942 Georges Simard; 1942-1945 Joseph Dufour; 1945-1949 François Gagnon; 1949-1951 Joseph Dufour; 1951-1953 Liguori Bergeron; 1953-1956 Pierre-Alphonse Tremblay; 1956-1959 Adrien Simard; 1959-1968 Adrien Tremblay; 1968-1975 Adrien Simard		
		(1917-) Adélard Grenon	Port-Alfred (1953)	1908-1914 Henry McNicoll 1914-1917 Omer Lavoie; 1917-1919 Johnny Lalancette; 1919-1925 Méridé Minier; 1925-1927 Johnny Lalancette; 1927-1935 Méridé Minier; 1935-1941 Philippe-Auguste Lavoie; 1941-1942 Georges Simard; 1942-1945 Joseph Dufour; 1945-1949 François Gagnon; 1949-1951 Joseph Dufour; 1951-1953 Liguori Bergeron; 1953-1956 Pierre-Alphonse Tremblay; 1956-1959 Adrien Simard; 1959-1968 Adrien Tremblay; 1968-1975 Adrien Simard		
		Town of Port-Alfred (1953)		1908-1914 Henry McNicoll 1914-1917 Omer Lavoie; 1917-1919 Johnny Lalancette; 1919-1925 Méridé Minier; 1925-1927 Johnny Lalancette; 1927-1935 Méridé Minier; 1935-1941 Philippe-Auguste Lavoie; 1941-1942 Georges Simard; 1942-1945 Joseph Dufour; 1945-1949 François Gagnon; 1949-1951 Joseph Dufour; 1951-1953 Liguori Bergeron; 1953-1956 Pierre-Alphonse Tremblay; 1956-1959 Adrien Simard; 1959-1968 Adrien Tremblay; 1968-1975 Adrien Simard		
		(19..-1976) Laurier Simard		1908-1914 Henry McNicoll 1914-1917 Omer Lavoie; 1917-1919 Johnny Lalancette; 1919-1925 Méridé Minier; 1925-1927 Johnny Lalancette; 1927-1935 Méridé Minier; 1935-1941 Philippe-Auguste Lavoie; 1941-1942 Georges Simard; 1942-1945 Joseph Dufour; 1945-1949 François Gagnon; 1949-1951 Joseph Dufour; 1951-1953 Liguori Bergeron; 1953-1956 Pierre-Alphonse Tremblay; 1956-1959 Adrien Simard; 1959-1968 Adrien Tremblay; 1968-1975 Adrien Simard		
Town of La Baie (1976)
(1976–1980) Laurier Simard (1980–1984) Claude Richard (1984–1988) Gérard-Raymond Morin (1988–1997) Claude Richard (1997–2002) Réjean Simard
Borough of La Baie (2002) (Borough presidents)
(2002–2008) Serge Simard, Jean Tremblay (2008–2009) Jean-Eudes Simard, Jean Tremblay (2009–2013) Jean-Eudes Simard, Jean Tremblay					(2013–2017) François Tremblay, Jean Tremblay	(2017–2021) Éric Simard, Josée Néron

=== Residential districts and urban planning ===
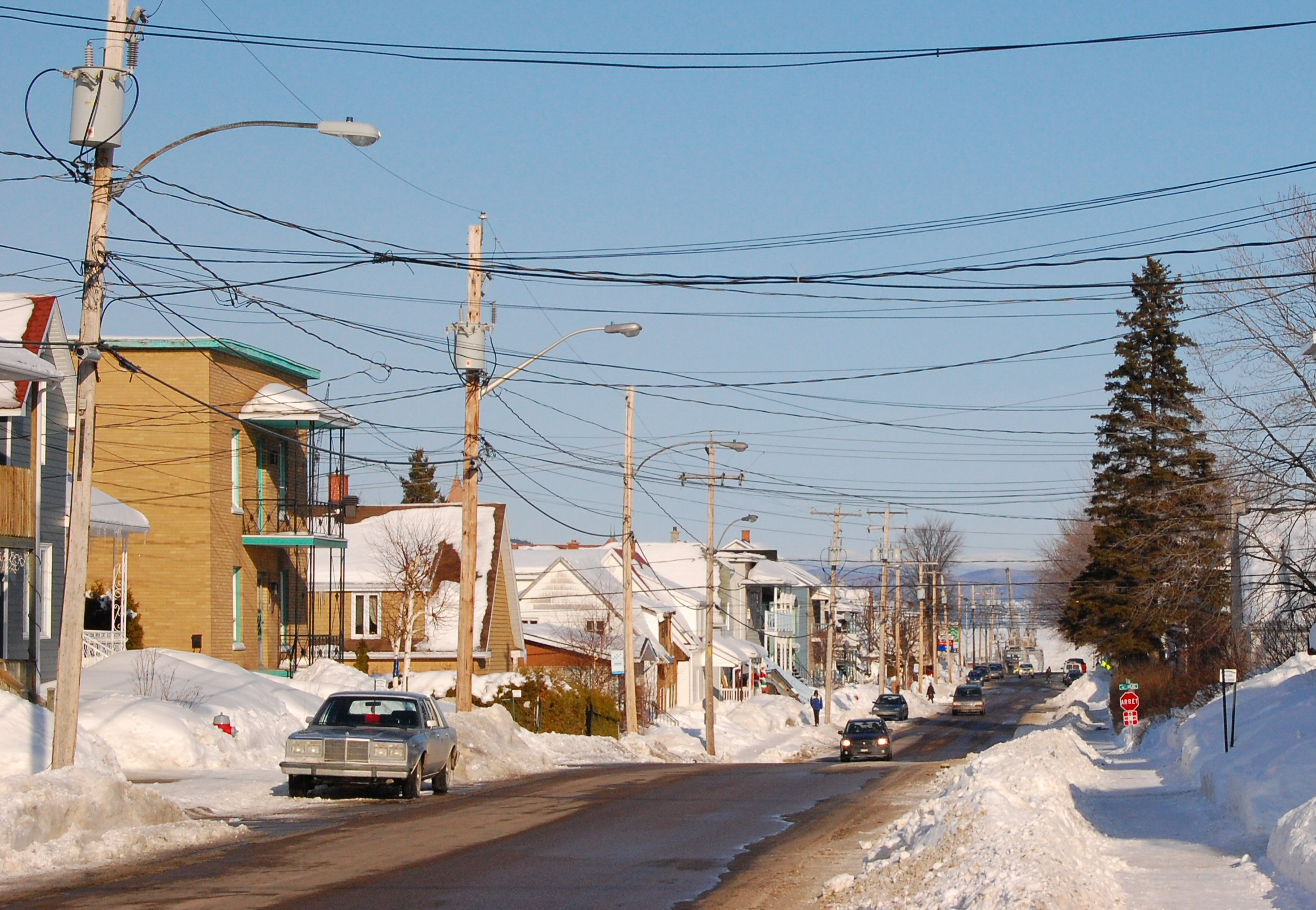
A Port-Alfred residential neighbourhood

According to Statistics Canada, in 2006 the La Baie Borough contained 8,112 dwellings, 7,763 or 95.7% of which were principal residences while 4.3% were second residences. The percentage of dwellings built after 1986 was 22.7% or 1,840 new dwellings, which is slightly above the Saguenay average of 22.1%. Among inhabited dwellings, 6.8% need major repairs, which is 0.1% higher than the city mean. The average value of the borough's dwellings is $103,131, which is lower than the city average of $116,559.

Most residences (45.8%) were single-family dwellings. Semidetached houses represented 6.8% of residences, while 2.9% were row houses and 18.2% were duplexes. Apartment buildings with less than five stories accounted for 23.2% and those with more than five stories were 0.2%. Rental units constituted 37% of dwellings (2,870) and owned dwellings made up 63% (4,890).

=== Politics ===
The federal riding of Chicoutimi—Le Fjord represents the borough's 15,051 voters. La Baie, which contains 20% of the riding's voters, has lost political clout to the more populous Chicoutimi Borough that shares the same Member of Parliament.

Chicoutimi—Le Fjord's current MP is Richard Martel of the Conservative Party.

At the provincial level, the La Baie Borough represents 41% of voters in the Dubuc riding.

The riding has been represented by the Quebec Liberal Party MNA Serge Simard since 2014.

=== Economics ===
Employment in the borough of La Baie (2006)
Sectors of activity	Number of jobs in 2006		Quebec
Agriculture and raw materials	305	3 %	4 %
Construction	565	6 %	5 %
Manufacturing	1,370	15 %	15 %
Wholesale trade	270	3 %	4 %
Retail	1,150	13 %	12 %
Finance and real estate	195	2 %	5 %
Health and social services	1,125	12 %	11 %
Education	580	6 %	7 %
Customer service	1,015	11 %	17 %
Other services	2,510	29 %	20 %
Total	9,085

La Baie's economy used to depend on logging and wood processing, which contributed the area's expansion during the twentieth century. Since the closure of Port-Alfred's Abitibi-Consolidated mill in 2004, the borough's main economic drivers have been the Rio Tinto Alcan aluminum smelter in Grande-Baie (684 employees) and the Bagotville military base (1,200 soldiers and 250 civilians). Overall, there are sixty-one businesses in thirty-four fields of activity. According to Statistics Canada, 56% or 9,085 of the borough's residents were part of the labour force in 2006. The 2006 unemployment rate was 8.5%. Workers from outside the borough come mainly from Chicoutimi, Jonquière, and the lower Saguenay region. More the half of the labour force of Saint-Félix-d'Otis and Ferland-et-Boilleau work in La Baie.

==== Primary and secondary sectors ====
===== Agriculture and the dairy industry =====
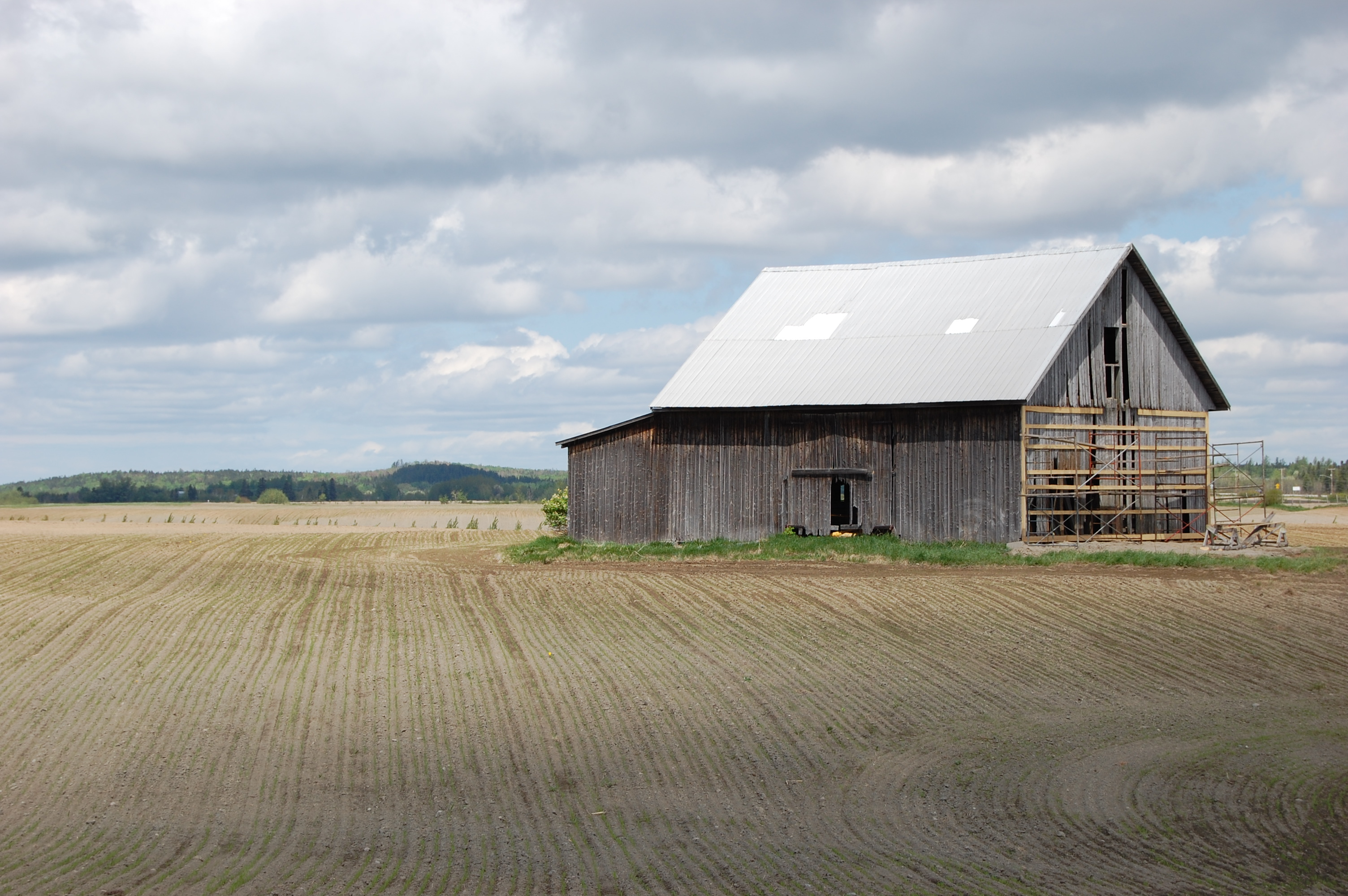
Arable land on the plateau between Chicoutimi and La Baie

Despite the harsh terrain around Ha! Ha! Bay, the plateaus that extend toward Laterrière and Chicoutimi and overhang Grande-Baie are fertile enough to produce small quantities of cereals and oleaginous plants. Truck farming is practised in fields and in greenhouses. La Baie also contains a tree nursery and a greenhouse for grass farming. Fodder crop production is important for supporting the borough's dairy industry. Deer and cattle farming are also practised.

L'écohameau de La Baie was founded in 1990 by the Groupe de recherches écologiques de la Batture (GREB). It includes an organic farm (Vallons de Chambreule) and six single-family ecological homes. For a long time, it was the only certified organic farm in Saguenay. In 2000, it was the first farm in Saguenay-Lac-Saint-Jean to offer Community-supported agriculture (community-supported agriculture) baskets.

Milk production is still the main agricultural activity. The borough contains twenty-one dairy farms that are members of the Fédération des producteurs de lait du Québec. There are two major milk processing companies in the borough: La Laiterie de La Baie, which employs seventy people and accounts for 25% of the region's dairy market and the Fromagerie Boivin which uses between 12 and 17 million litres of milk a year to manufacture Cheddar cheese. Les bergeries du Fjord make a sheep's milk cheese.

===== Logging =====
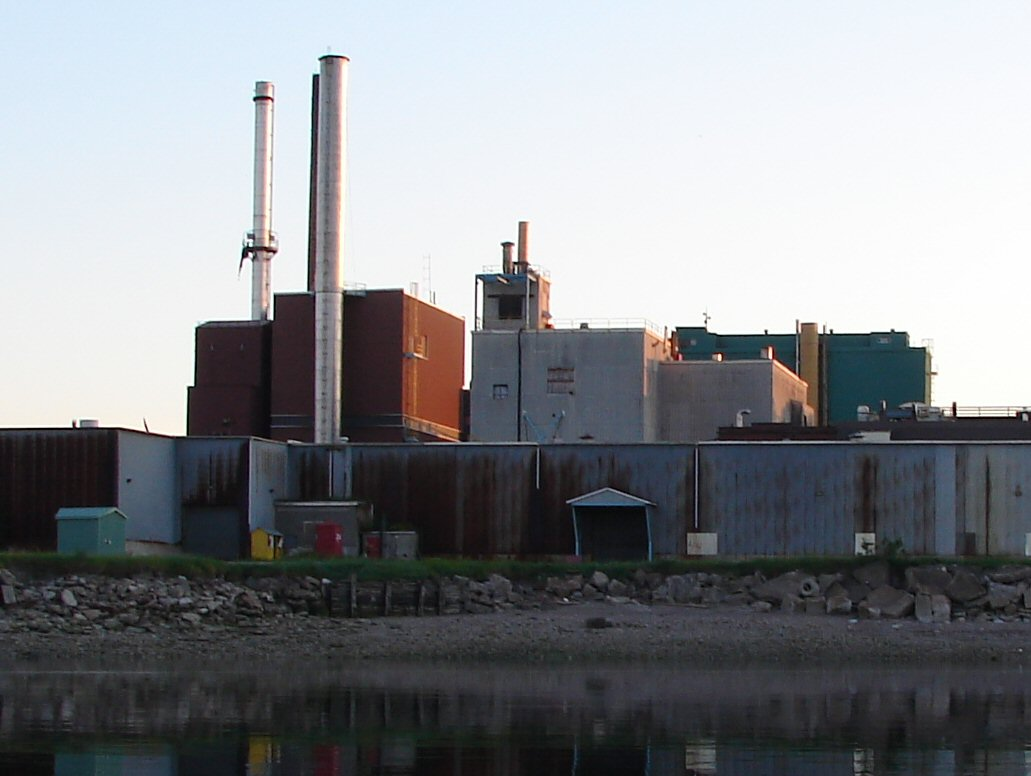
The Port-Alfred mill, which was demolished in 2006

The logging and wood substance processing industries generated 1,172 jobs in 2002. The 2004 closure of the Abitibi-Consolidated paper mill led to the direct or indirect loss of 780 jobs, totalling 30 million dollars in lost wages. The MDF La Baie plant, which was founded in 1996 and employs 120 people, had to cut eighty jobs in 2007 and 2008 because of the decreased demand for MDF panels.

Outside of large industry, La Baie's logging sector includes small- and medium-sized businesses involved in forest management and wood transportation. Some local sawmills include the Scierie Armand Tremblay & Fils and the Scierie Gauthier, which is the oldest business in the Saguenay-Lac-Saint-Jean region. After the Abitibi-Consolidated-owned Scierie Saguenay closed in 2005, it transferred most of its fifty employees to the Saint-Fulgence sawmill. Several small businesses manufacture wood into end items such as kitchen cabinetry, furniture, roof framing, and flooring.

===== Quarries, non-ferrous materials, and chemicals =====
Although La Baie does not have any mines, granitic rock is extracted in Grenville Province, particularly Laurentian granite and gneiss. These quarries contain polychrome, an architectural stone used in the World Financial Centre in New York, the Canadian Museum of Civilization in Ottawa, Ontario, Canada and the Ronald Reagan Building and International Trade Centre in Washington's Federal Triangle. The borough's other quarries specialize in crushed, building, and landscaping stone.

Other minor industrial activities include glass-cutting, the production of plastic and chemical derivatives (such as cleaners and industrial degreasers), PVC window frames, and asphalt.

===== Metals =====
In 2002, aluminum production at the Rio Tinto Alcan plant in Grande-Baie combined with metal fabrication and machining generated 1,147 jobs in the borough. The Grande-Baie aluminum smelter, which opened its doors in 1980, employs 684 people and produces 196,000 tonnes of aluminum annually. Nearly 40% of the plant's employees live in the borough. Related industries such as aluminum fabrication, structural framing, and iron frame production are also essential to La Baie's economy.

===== Commerce =====
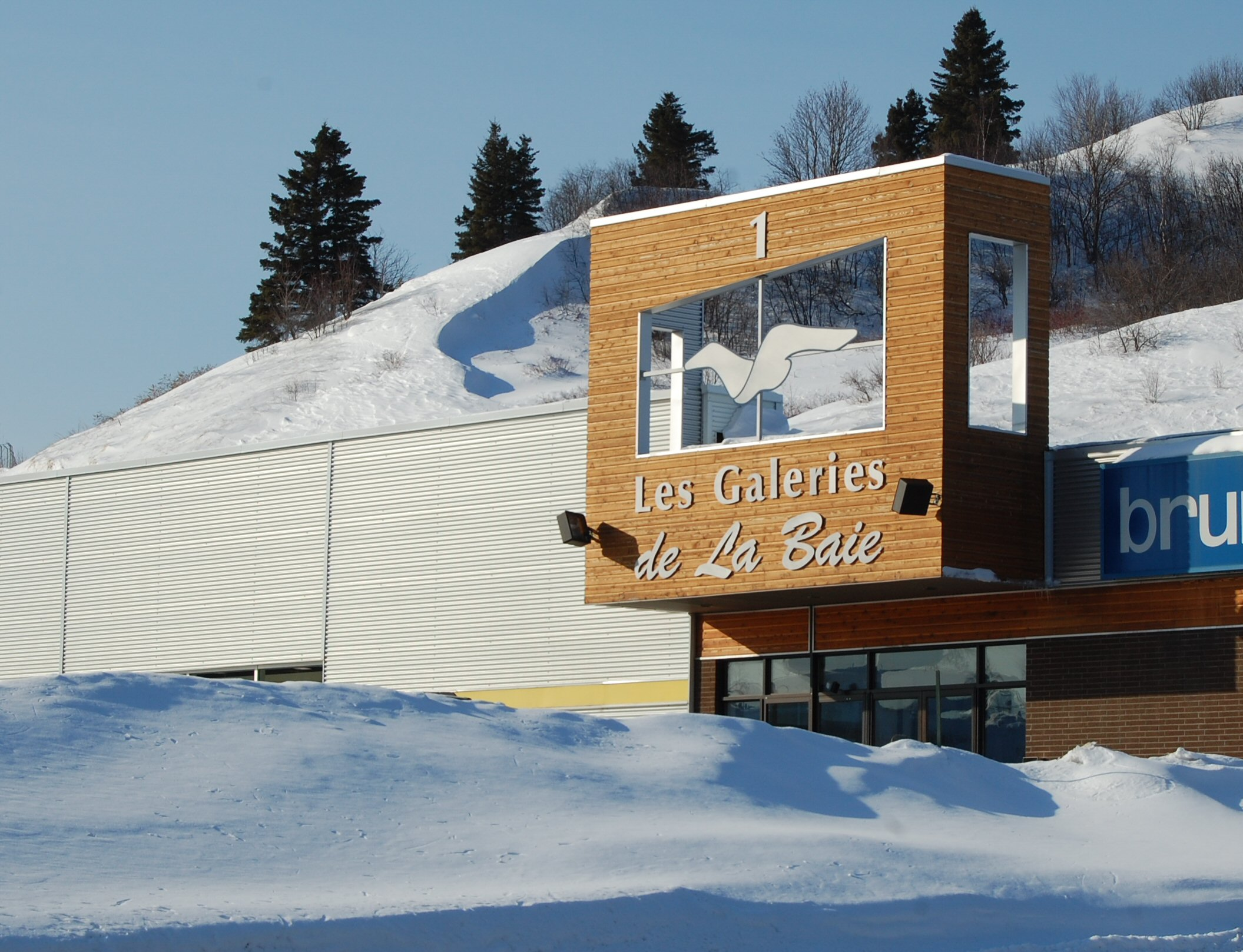
The Galeries de La Baie shopping centre

The borough's market potential is estimated at 220 million dollars. Despite the presence of the Galeries de La Baie shopping centre, which employs 185 people, and Victoria Street, the borough's main commercial artery, La Baie has the smallest area of commercial influence. Along with Dolbeau-Mistassini, La Baie's residents are the least likely in the region to shop in their own neighbourhood. Even though the borough is closer to the lower Saguenay area and is linked there by a direct road, Chicoutimi is the region's most popular shopping destination.

===== Institutions =====
The 425th tactical fighter squadron badge

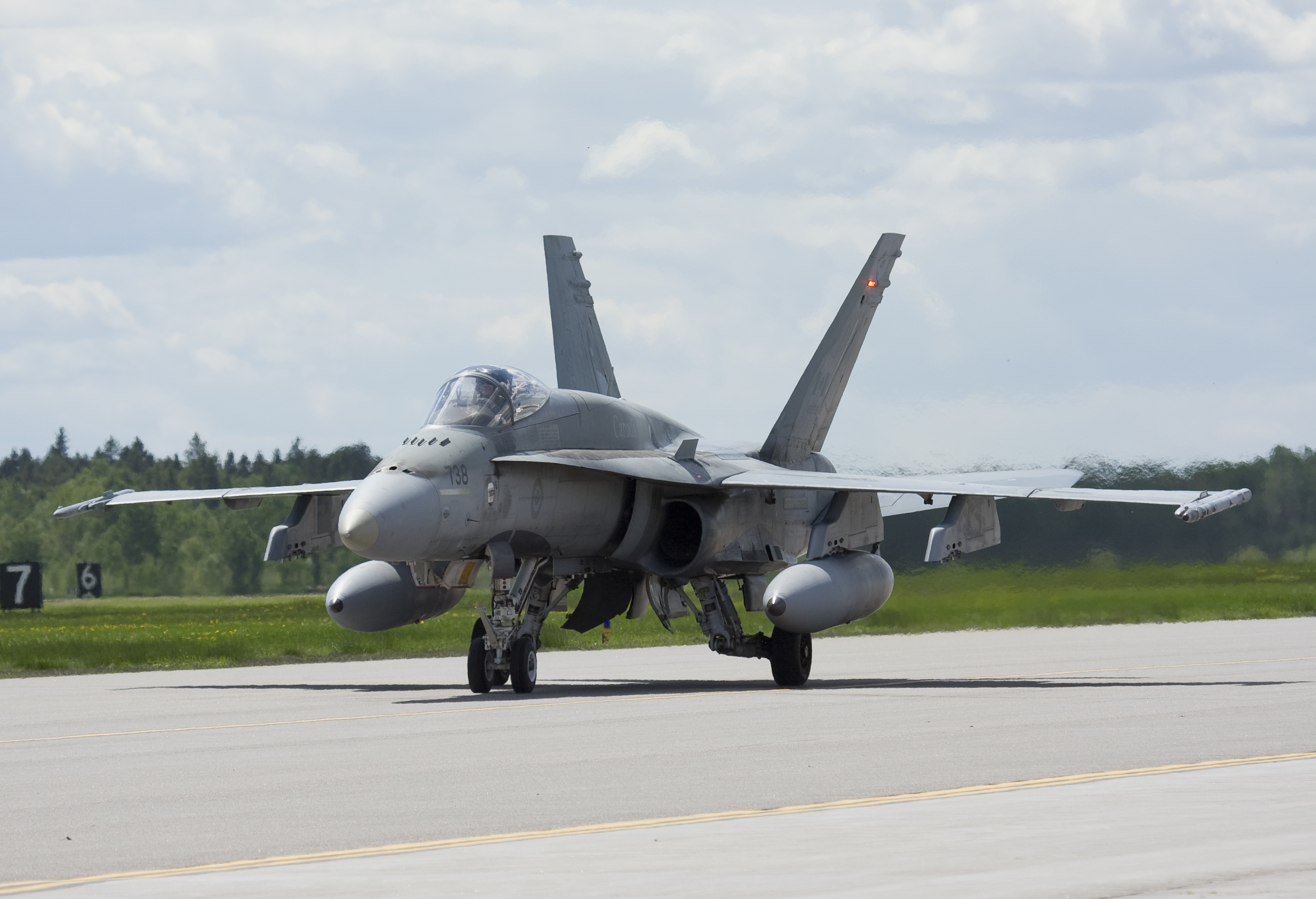
A CF-18 interceptor plane of the 425th tactical fighter squadron taking off from Bagotville

The Canadian Forces Base Bagotville is the borough's main employer. It has 1,584 permanent and temporary employees, including the 837 military families of 3 Wing. It brings 100 million dollars to the area, including 65 million dollars in salaries and 11 million dollars of federal investment in La Baie and the Saguenay-Lac-St-Jean region. The airbase's control tower is managed by Nav Canada, which also collects weather data.

Other federal institutions in the borough include a Department of Public Works and Government Services office inside the Bagotville base and a Human Resources and Skill Development office offering immigration and employment services. There is also a Community Futures Development Corporation office, an organization that focuses on community economic development.

The borough's provincial institutions include a Centre local d'emplois, a Carrefour jeunesse emploi, and a Société de l'assurance automobile du Québec branch. The Dubuc MNA's riding office is also located in the borough.

=== Transportation ===
==== Automobile ====
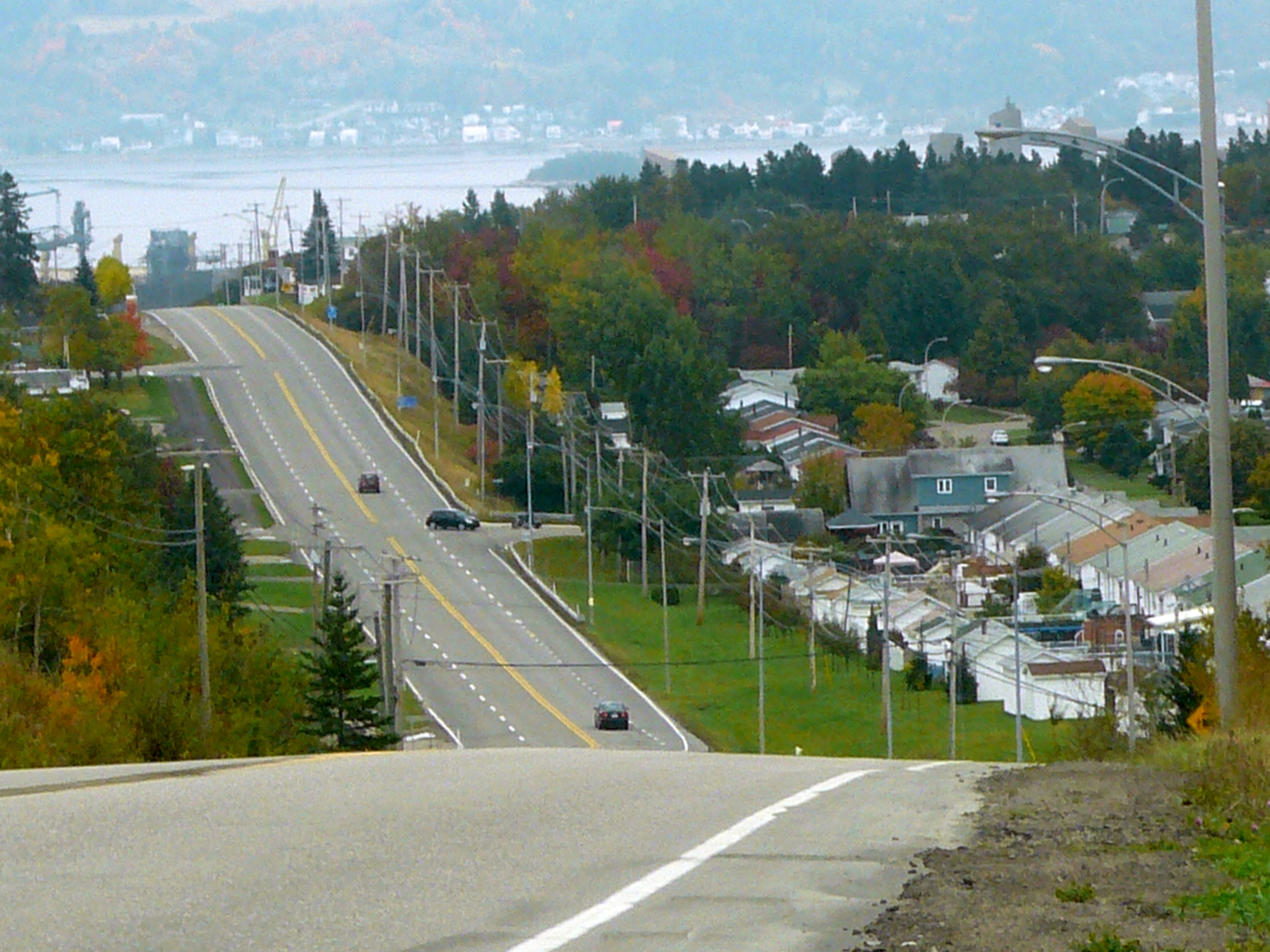
The De la Grande-Baie Nord Boulevard (Highway 372) toward downtown La Baie

A provincial highway and two interregional highways cross La Baie. The main road, Highway 170, runs from Highway 70 (which junctions with Highway 175) to Chicoutimi and Port-Alfred. It becomes an interregional highway along Ha! Ha! Bay toward lower Saguenay. The other interregional highway, the Route du petit Parc (Highway 381), begins at Port-Alfred and heads toward Ferland-et-Boilleau. These interregional roads both connect the Saguenay-Lac-Saint-Jean region to Charlevoix. The only intermunicipal highway is Saint-Jean-Baptiste Boulevard, which becomes Grande-Baie Nord Boulevard (Highway 372) on the eastern edge of the borough. It connects Rivière-du-Moulin in Chicoutimi to Bagotville.

Automobile traffic in the borough passes mostly on Highway 170. The stretch between Bagotville Airport and Grande-Baie is used by 10,000 automobiles daily. Between Grande-Baie and lower Saguenay, it drops to 2,500 to 5,000 automobiles. The Petit Parc (Highway 381) in direction of Ferland-et-Boilleau is used by 1,000 to 2,500 vehicles per day and the ligne Bagot (Grande-Anse Road) between Bagotville Airport and the Grande-Anse Maritime Terminal is travelled by fewer than 1,000 vehicles a day. In 2000, 5% of vehicles from outside the region came from the Laurentian Wildlife Reserve (Highway 175) and 30% from lower Saguenay using Highway 170. Over 1,000 heavy vehicles drive between La Baie and Chicoutimi every day using only this road. Fewer than 500 heavy vehicles a day come from lower Sagenay and Ferland-de-Boilleau.

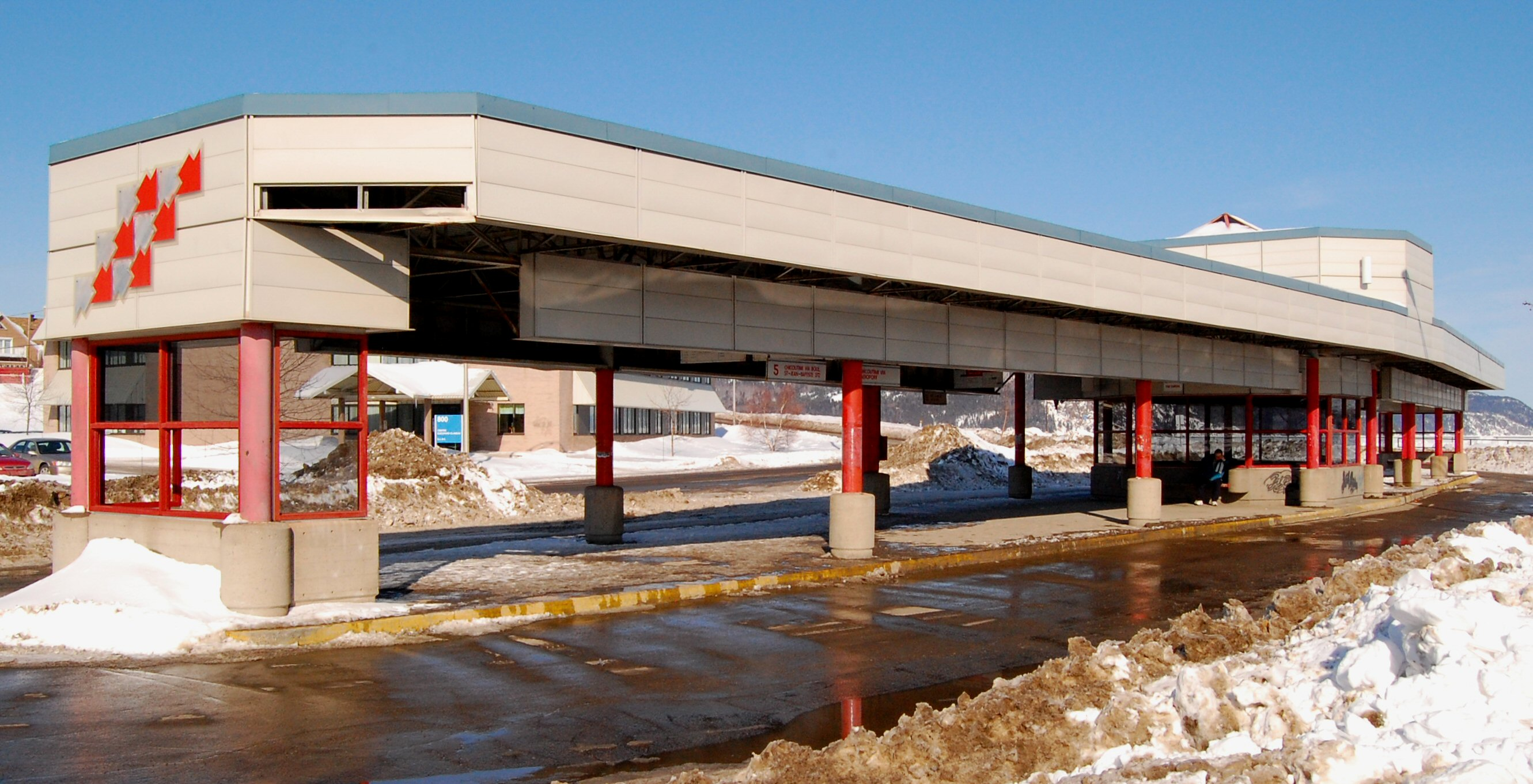
STS Terminal in La Baie

Public transportation in the borough is provided by the City-owned Société de transport du Saguenay (STS). Two bus lines link the Chicoutimi and La Baie terminals: the Via Saint-Jean-Baptiste line that uses Highway 372 and the Via Aéroport that goes by Highway 170. Three bus lines from the La Baie terminal serve the borough year-round and one during the winter. The Des Érables via Centre d'achats line travels to the Bagotville sector, the Polyvalente de La Baie via Avenue du Parc to Port-Alfred, and the Boulevard de la Grande-Baie Sud to Grande-Baie. The fourth bus line, Chemin Saint-Louis, travels along Saint-Louis Road during the wintertime.

Cyclists can travel through La Baie using Route Verte 8. The bicycle path enters La Baie by De la Grande-Baie Nord Boulevard and reaches Laurier-Simard Quay, where it stretches six kilometres along Ha! Ha! Bay.

==== Maritime ====
The La Baie Borough has two deep-water ports:

- The port facilities in Port-Alfred at the end of Ha! Ha! Bay; and
- The Grande-Anse Maritime Terminal (Port of Saguenay) located outside of Ha! Ha! Bay on the Saguenay River, on the north shore of Cap-à-l'ouest.

===== Port-Alfred =====
Traffic in Port-Alfred (2003)
Imported goods	3,800,000 t
Bauxite	3,030,000 t
Petroleum coke	350,000 t
Caustic soda	190,000 t
Fuel oil	160,000 t
Fluorite	70,000 t
Exported goods	930,000 t
Aluminum	930,000 t
Goods in transit	4,730,000 t

Port-Alfred is the largest port in the Saguenay-Lac-Saint-Jean region and has been owned by Alcan since 1924. It is the main entryway for the natural resources the region's aluminum smelters require. In 2006, 5.5 million tonnes of raw and manufactured material passed through these installations.

The Compagnie de Pulpe de Chicoutimi built the first port facilities on the Ha! Ha! Bay in the early twentieth century. Port-Alfred's mill and deep-water port made shipping pulp overseas much easier than Chicoutimi's port facilities, which were limited by the Saguenay River's shallow northern arm. The Port-Alfred Quay was opened in 1915. In 1924, the Compagnie de Pulpe de Chicoutimi's bankruptcy forced the company to sell its transportation infrastructure including the Port-Alfred port facilities to Alcan. The port was redeveloped to be able to receive bauxite and other materials needed for aluminum production and for shipping the Port-Alfred Pulp and Paper Corporation's newsprint. Duncan Quay was completed in 1938 and Powell Quay in 1948. Since 1976, icebreakers have kept Port-Alfred's port facilities accessible year-round. In 2000, Alcan entrusted the management of Powell Quay to the Saguenay Port Authority.

Port Alfred's Quays:

Duncan Quay: Rio Tinto Alcan has owned Duncan Quay since its construction in 1938. This quay imports raw material and exports aluminum. It is 386 metres long, has two berths, and is 11.9 metres deep at low tide. It is connected to a railway. It can accommodate ships of over 69,000 tonnes.

Powell Quay: The Saguenay Port Authority has owned Powell Quay since 2000. It mainly exports finished goods and secondary processing products overseas and imports Alcan's liquid bulk. Before Abitibi-Consolidated closed in 2003, the quay also exported newsprint. It is 347 metres long, has four berths, and is 10 to 10.9 metres deep at low tide. A railway also passes through the quay. It can accommodate ships of over 69,000 tonnes.

Between 130 and 140 ships dock at Port-Alfred each year. They mainly originate from bauxite-exporting countries like Brazil, Ghana, and Guinea and carry bauxite, petroleum coke, sodium hydroxide, fuel oil, and fluorite. The port also exports most of the aluminum ingots produced in the region's four smelters.

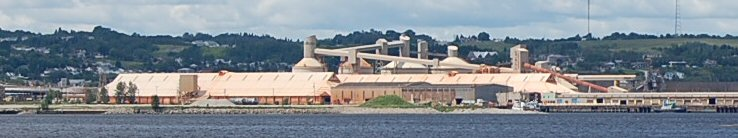
Port-Alfred's port facilities

===== Port of Grande-Anse =====
Traffic in the Port of Grande-Anse (2007)
Imported goods	141,814 t	Exported goods	98,082 t
▲ De-icing salt	63,371 t	▼ Wood pulp	69,033 t
▲ Pitch	32,681 t	▼ Aluminum	14,284 t
▲ Coal	30,391 t	▼ Timber	13,743 t
▲ Boxed goods	5,717 t	▼ Boxed goods	1,022 t
▲ Granite	4,956 t
▲ Bricks	4,698 t
		Goods in transit	239,896 t

The Grande-Anse Maritime Terminal (Port of Saguenay) is the only publicly owned port in Saguenay-Lac-Saint-Jean. It is a member of the Association of Canadian Port Authorities. It originally imported hydrocarbons but it progressively began transporting forest products, general merchandise, and liquid and dry bulk. In 2000, its annual total capacity increased to 600,000 tonnes.

It was originally built in 1985 to offset the closure of the port in Chicoutimi and to relocate oil tanks outside of the city's downtown area. The Grande-Anse Maritime Terminal received its letters patent in 1999 from the Canadian government and became the Saguenay Port Authority (Port of Saguenay).

Marcel-Dionne Quay: The quay was named after Marcel Dionne, the federal Member of Parliament for Chicoutimi—Le Fjord from 1979 to 1984. It is 286 metres long, has two berths and is 13.8 metres deep at low tide. It is open year-round and can accommodate ships of over 100,000 tonnes.

Since 2004, the Grande-Anse Maritime Terminal has complied with the International Ship and Port Facility Security Code, allowing it to receive foreign ships.

==== Rail ====
Although railways were built in Chicoutimi by 1893, locomotives did not arrive in Bagotville until 1910. The Compagnie de Pulpe de Chicoutimi created an affiliate in 1909, the Compagnie de chemin de fer de la Baie des Ha! Ha!, to build a railway linking the Chicoutimi pulp mill to the quay in Bagotville. The line was originally part of the Roberval-Saguenay rail network. Alcan bought the railway in 1925 after the Compagnie de Pulpe de Chicoutimi's bankruptcy the previous year. It used the railway to bring raw materials from Port-Alfred to its aluminum smelter in Arvida. The rail network expanded after the construction of new smelters in the region. Tracks were laid in the La Baie Borough to service plants in Grande-Baie and Laterrière.

Every year, 87,700 full boxcars rode to or from Port-Alfred on the Roberval-Saguenay network. The network employed 121 people and used eleven locomotives to transport 7,540,000 tonnes of materials annually.

==== Air ====
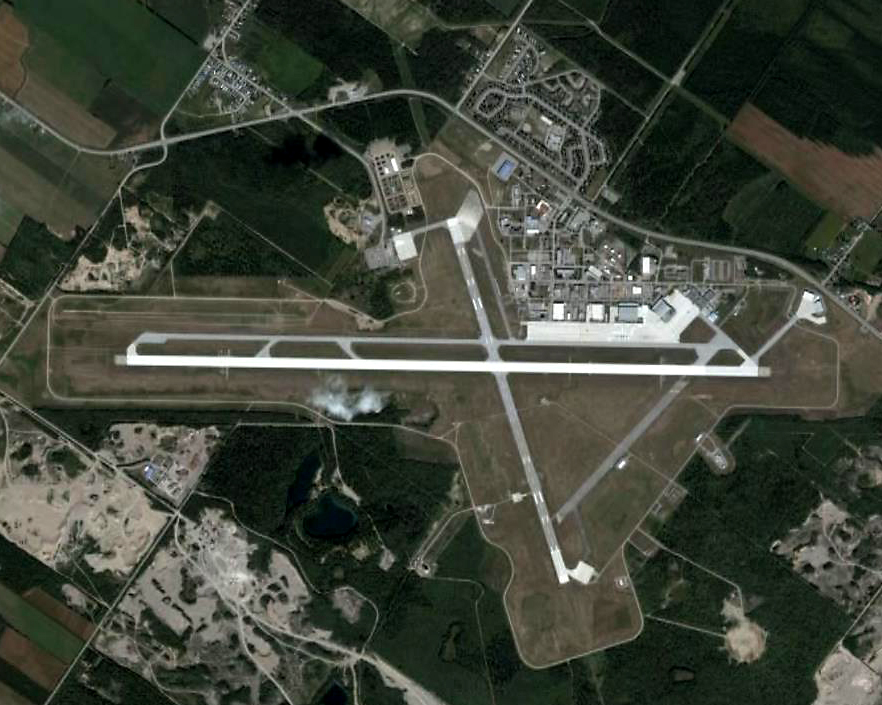
The Bagotville military base and airport

Bagotville Airport (YBG) is Saguenay-Lac-Saint-Jean's main civilian airport and shares its facilities with 3 Wing Bagotville. It handles 90,000 passengers a year. In 2000, the civilian facilities were given to the City of Saguenay by Transport Canada; Promotion Saguenay manages the airport. Flights to Montreal and other Quebec destinations take off daily. Since 2006 and 2008 respectively, Sunwing Airlines and Air Transat have offered international flights to southern destinations in the winter.

== Culture and society ==
=== Education ===
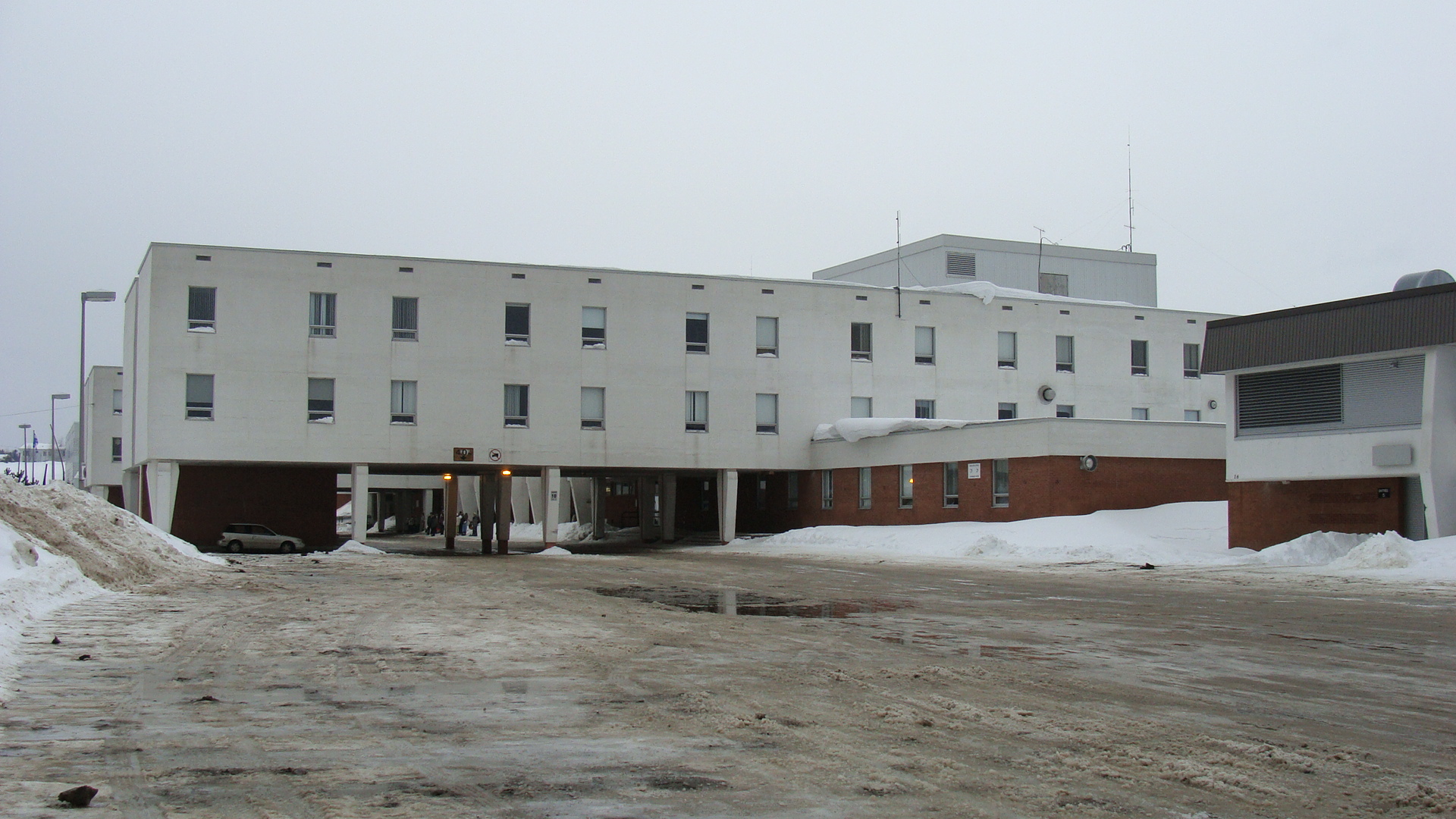
École Secondaire des Grandes Marées high school

La Baie's first schoolhouse opened in 1841. In the 1920s, these small country schools were replaced by larger institutions in villages and towns. According to authors Luc Noppen and Lucie K. Morisset, "There are still some rare examples, although not always in good shape, on the rural roads located on the town of La Baie's territory."

The first Ha! Ha! Bay school boards were created in the 1860s. The Bagotville School Board (French: Commission scolaire de Bagotville) was founded in 1862, followed by school boards in Grande-Baie in 1880 and Port-Alfred in 1918. These three school boards merged in 1960 and became the Ha! Ha! Bay Local School Board (French: Commission scolaire locale de la Baie-des-Ha! Ha!).

La Baie has been under the jurisdiction of the Saguenay Riverside School Board (French: Commission scolaire des Rives du Saguenay) since 1998. During the 2008–2009 academic year, there were four elementary schools in the borough: the George-Vanier and Sainte-Thérèse Schools in Bagotville, the Médéric-Gravel School in Port-Alfred, and the Saint-Joseph School in Grande-Baie. There are 1,085 elementary students enrolled in these schools. The only high school in the Ha! Ha! Bay area, the École Secondaire des Grandes Marées (formerly Polyvalente de La Baie), has 1,200 students. The Durocher adult education centre in the Grande-Baie sector has 575 students.

Vocational training is the highest level of education available within the borough. The Centre de formation professionnelle de La Baie offers its 138 students training programs in metallurgy, cabinetwork, forestry, and composite materials. The closest post-secondary institutions (CEGEPs and universities) are in Chicoutimi.

The borough also has a branch of the Saguenay public library network located in the same building as the Théâtre municipal.

=== Religion ===
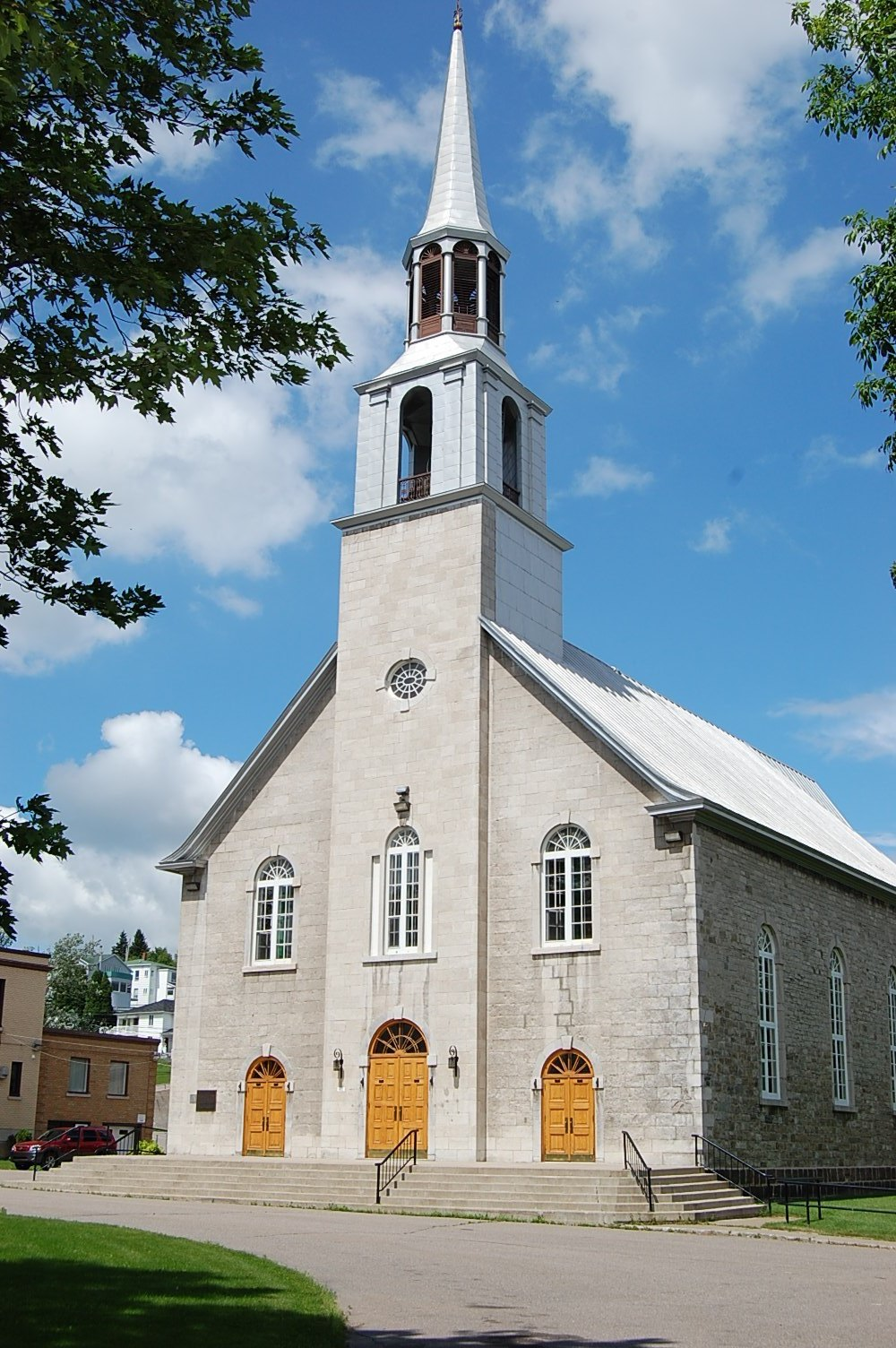
The Saint-Alphonse-de-Liguori Church in Bagotville

According to the Institut de la statistique du Québec, the Catholic Church had 18,865 adherents in the borough in 2001, or 96% of the population. The borough is divided into two parishes: Saint-Alexis and Saint-Alphonse, which includes the Saint-Édouard, Saint-Marc, and Notre-Dame-de-la-Baie Churches. Atheists were the second largest group with 460 (2%), followed by Protestants with 240 adherents (1.3%), and other Christian denominations at 135 (0.6%). Ha! Ha! Bay residents practising other religions make up less than 0.1% of the population. The borough has two cemeteries (Saint-Alphonse & Saint-Alexis and Saint-Édouard) managed by the Corporation des Cimetières Catholiques de La Baie.

==== Establishment of the Catholic Church in Ha! Ha! Bay ====
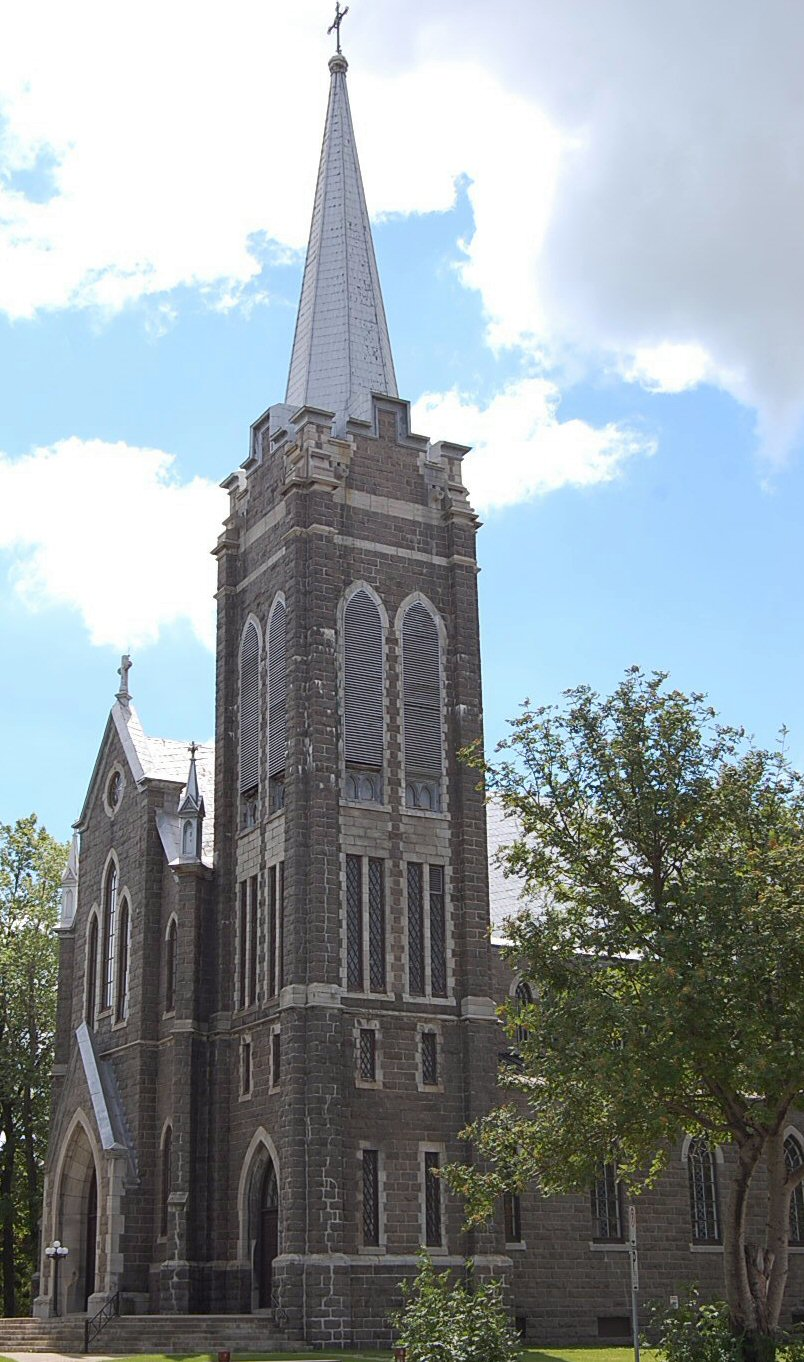
The Saint-Édouard Church in the Port-Alfred sector

Permanent outposts of the Catholic Church in Saguenay-Lac-Saint-Jean were limited to a few missions near Saint-Jean Lake and at the trading post in Chicoutimi until about 1840 when the first colonists arrived in Ha! Ha! Bay. The first chapel was erected in 1842 in Grande-Baie; its first regular priest was Reverend Charles Pouliot. The Catholic Church's role as a catalyst for colonization was strengthened with the arrival of the Oblates in 1844. The order repaired the Grande-Baie chapel and served the Chez Mars village (Bagotville). They advocated the building of a church in the Ha! Ha! Bay area, although they only actively participated in the establishment of the Grande-Baie parish council. The Oblates left the region in 1853.

Reverend Léandre Gill was sent by the Church in 1853 to continue where the Oblates left off. He was given a difficult mission: to merge all of the places of worship in Ha! Ha! Bay. Gill was tasked with countering any possible influence from the Protestants who came to work for William Price's sawmills. He settled in Saint-Alphose (Bagotville) and served at Saint-Alexis (Grande-Baie) twice a month. The Saint-Alphose-de-Liguori Parish in Bagotville was canonically established in 1857. The two parishes did not have any resident priests until 1858. Grande-Baie's Saint-Alexis Parish was founded in 1861.

==== Construction of churches ====
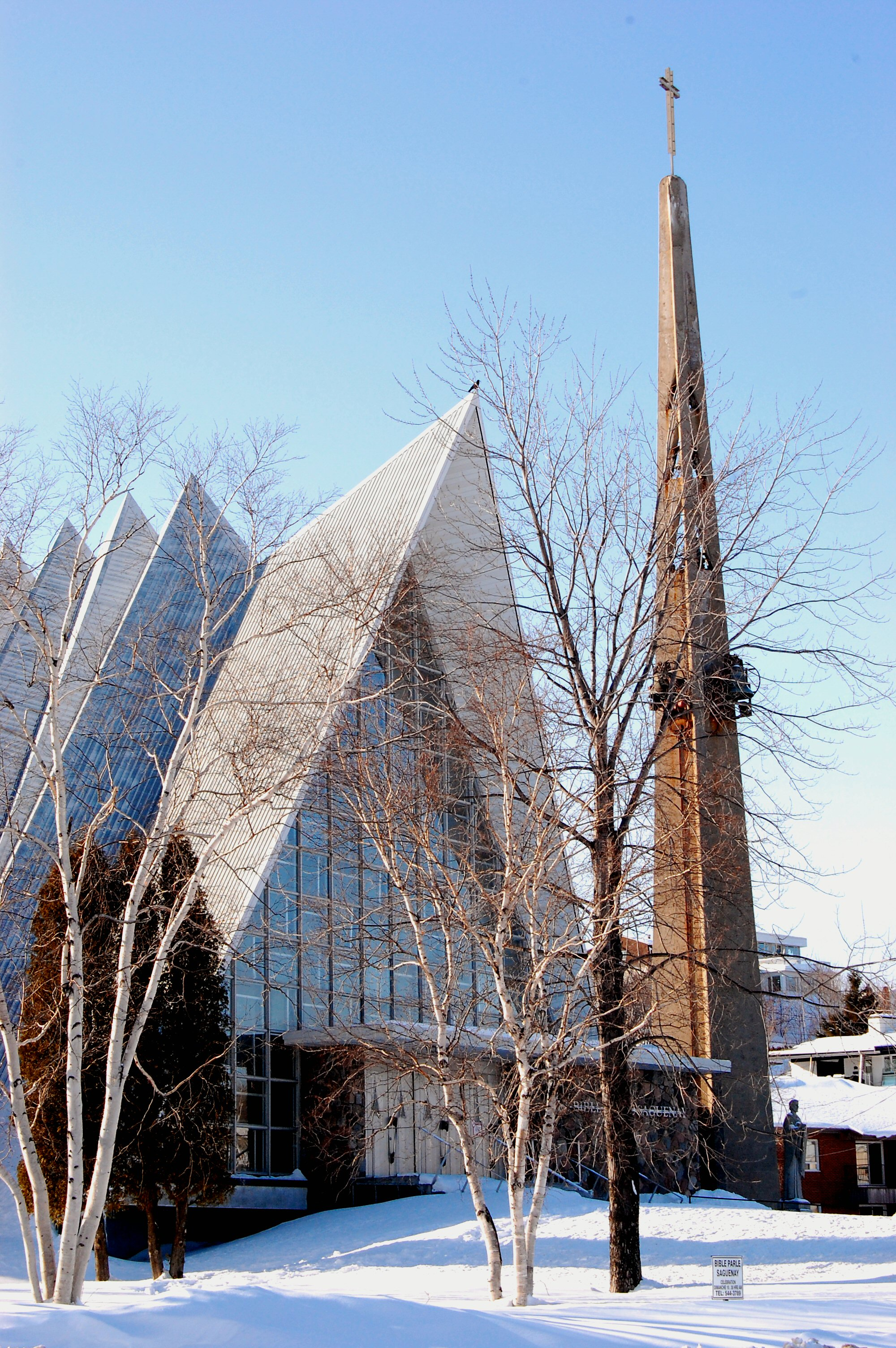
The Saint-Marc Church in the Bagotville sector

Saint-Alphose-de-Liguori is the first and oldest church in the Saguenay-Lac-Saint-Jean region. It was built in Bagotville between 1860 and 1862. The stone church tower was not built until 1867 and the interior was not completed until 1887. Grande-Baie's Saint-Alexis, Ha! Ha! Bay's second church, was completed in 1868. In 1902, the Marist Brothers took over the Sainte-Thérèse School in Bagotville, which was located at the northwest intersection of Victoria and De la Fabrique Streets before its current location was built in 1942. The soeurs du Bon-Conseil ran the newly rebuilt Médéric-Gravel School in 1922 after the 1918 original burned down. Two schools for boys were founded in 1927: the Saint-Alphose Academy (French: académie Saint-Alphose) in Bagotville and the Saint-Édouard College (French: collège Saint-Joseph) in Port-Alfred. They were administered by the Brothers of the Sacred Heart and the Brothers of the Christian Schools respectively.

The third church was opened in May 1930 to replace the Saint-Édouard Chapel in Port-Alfred, which was built for the canonical establishment of the new town in 1918. The Saint-Édouard Church was built in a thirteenth-century English style. A quarter of the construction costs were provided the London financiers that owned the Port Alfred Pulp and Paper Company. The Sisters of Sainte-Marie-de-la-Présentation, who arrived from France in 1934, opened a new convent in Grande-Baie in 1940. In 1948, the Brothers of the Sacred Heart built the Saint-Joseph College in Grande-Baie.

The Saint-Marc Parish in Bagotville, canonically established in 1953, blessed its new church in 1956. Saguenay architect Paul-Marie Côté conceptualized the building that "introduced modernism to Quebec religious architecture in a spectacular way." In February 2009, the church was named a Quebec historical site by Minister Christine St-Pierre. The decision was retroactive on June 25, 2008.

The fourth and final church built in the bay area was in the Notre-Dame-de-La-Baie Parish in Port-Alfred in 1962. Its wooden frame won a prize in the 1965 Canadian Aesthetic Competition.

=== Health and social services ===
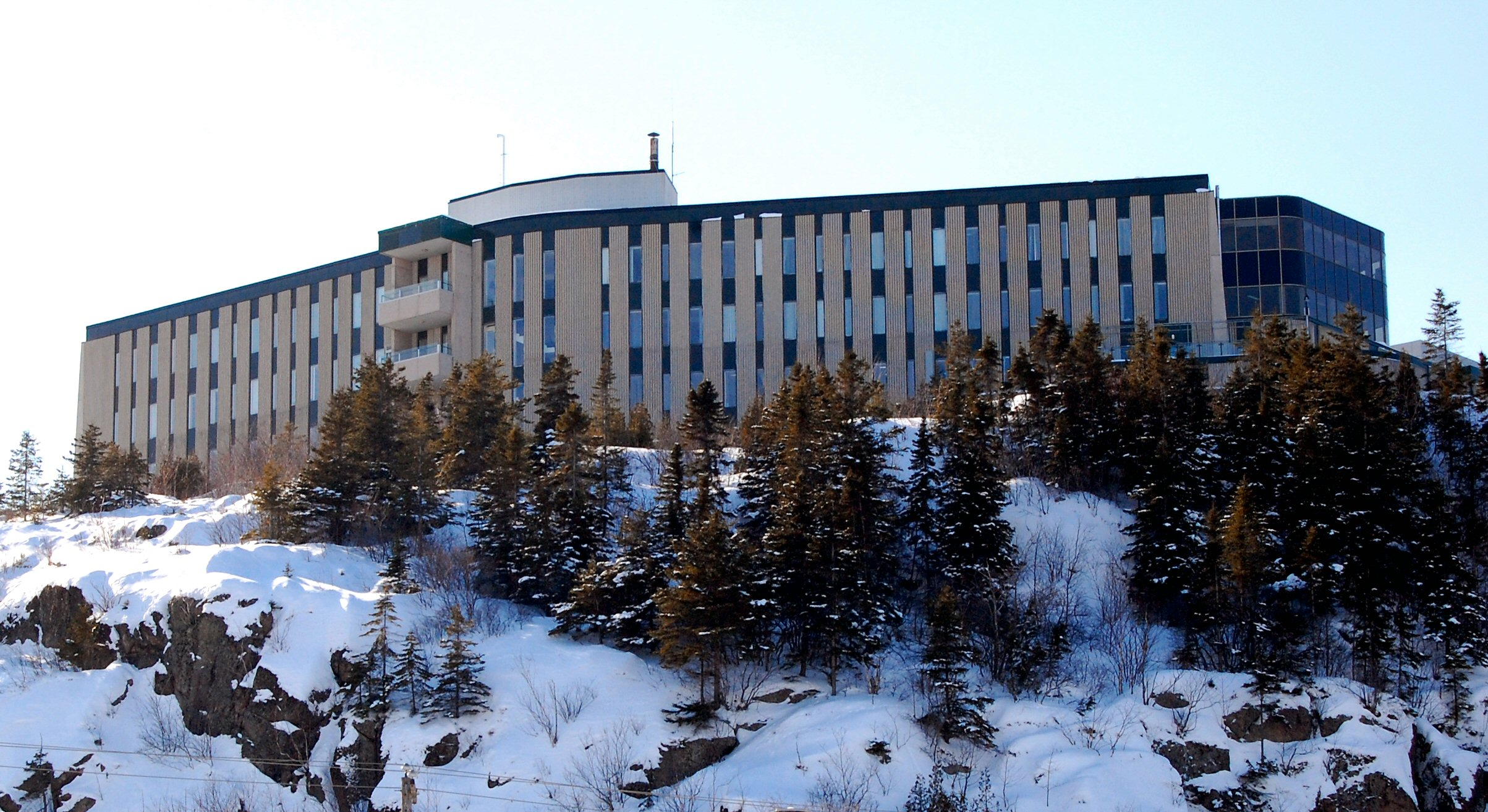
Ha! Ha! Bay hospital

The Ha! Ha! Bay Hospital (French: Hôpital de la baie des Ha! Ha!) in the Bagotville sector is the only health and social services centre (CSSS) in the borough. It includes the St-Joseph and Bagotville long-term care centres (CHSLD). It has twenty-five short-term beds and 127 long-term beds. The community clinic (CLSC), which is also in Bagotville, is known as the Centre Cléophas-Claveau.

La Baie has three medical clinics, four dental clinics, and a mental health treatment centre called Le centre de rencontre Le Phare. It also has Le havre du Fjord, a drug and alcohol abuse treatment centre. The Maison de l'espoir du Saguenay-Lac-Saint-Jean assist youths who have family difficulties or have dropped out of school.

=== Arts and entertainment ===
==== Museums ====
The borough contains two museums.

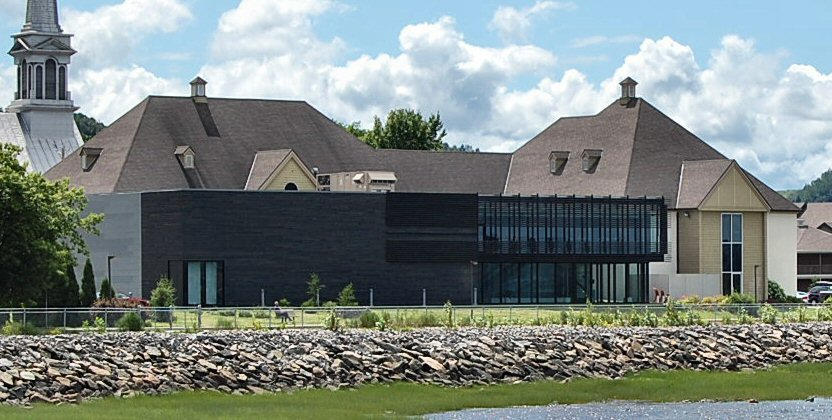
The musée du Fjord

===== Musée du Fjord =====
The Fjord Museum (French: musée du Fjord) in the Grande-Baie sector is dedicated to the Ha! Ha! Bay and Saguenay Fjord's historical, artistic, and environmental heritage. From 1967 to 1983, it was known as the Musée Monseigneur-Dufour. In 1996, the Saguenay Flood caused a considerable amount of damage to the museum. It was reopened in 2004 after being renovated and expanded.

===== The Air Defence Museum =====
The Air Defence Museum on the Bagotville military base is the only military aviation museum in Quebec. It was inaugurated on June 18, 1997, and is located in what was once a Protestant chapel. In the surrounding commemorative park, visitors can see an F-86 Sabre, a CF-100 Canuck, a CT-133 Silver Star, a CF-5 Freedom Fighter, a CF-101 Voodoo, a Piasecki H-21, and a Mig-23ML.

==== Entertainment ====
The borough's auditorium, the théâtre du Palais municipal, has a capacity of 2,300 people. It is the borough's largest amphitheatre and one of the most-used gathering places in Saguenay.

Since 1988, the historical extravaganza La Fabuleuse Histoire d'un royaume has been performed every summer. Music and comedy shows are also presented year-round.

== Sports, parks, and recreation ==
=== Fishing ===
==== Ice fishing ====
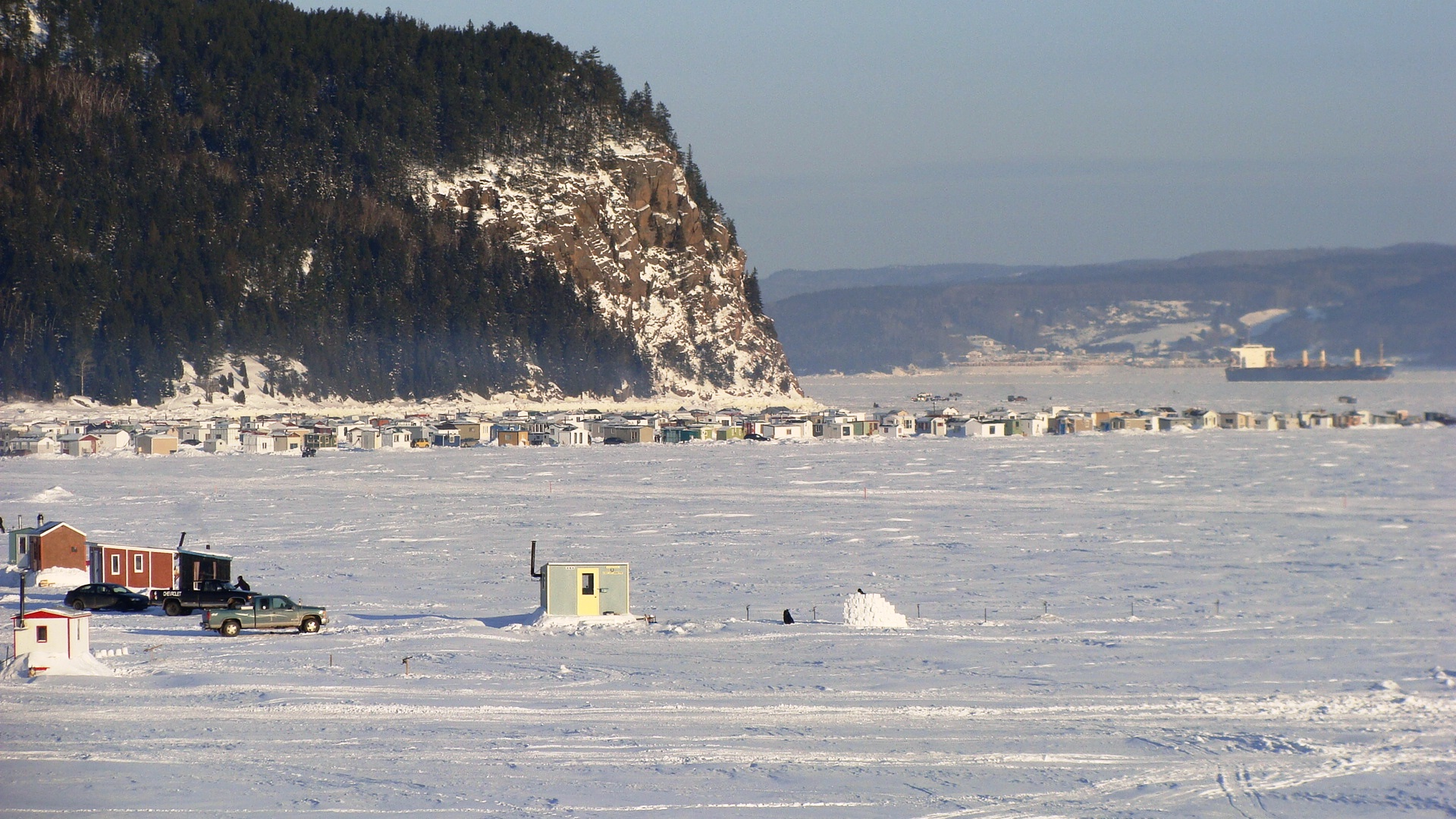
An ice village in L'Anse-à-Benjamin

Every winter, the ice on Ha! Ha! Bay becomes thick enough to support cabins and vehicles for ice fishing. At the height of the season, there are about 1,000 cabins mainly located around Grande-Baie, Les Battures, and L'Anse-à-Benjamin. Rockfish, lake smelt, ogac, Atlantic cod, and black turbot are fished there.

==== Salmon fly-fishing ====
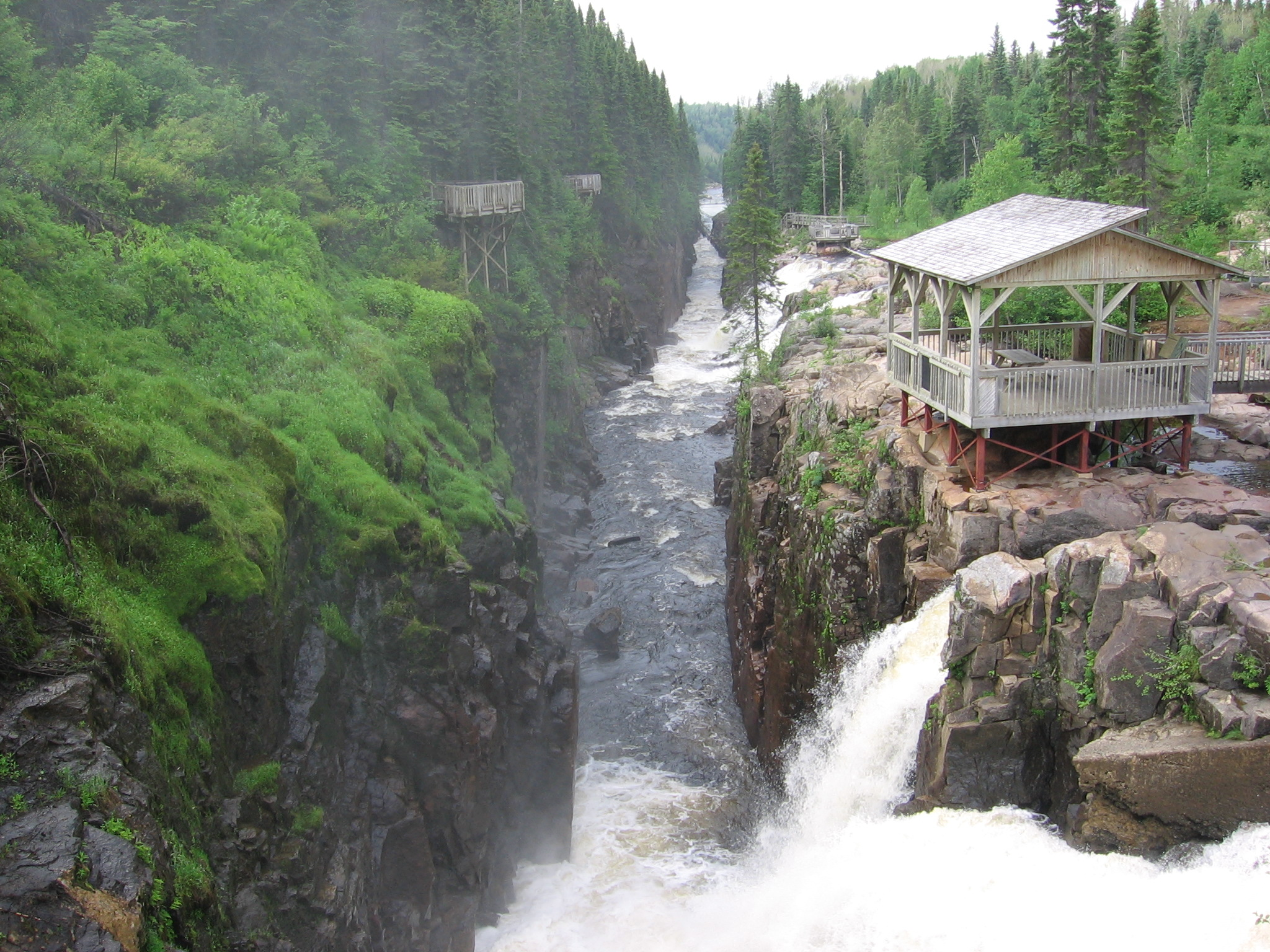
A canyon on the Mars River in the Centre plein-air Bec-Scie

The Mars River is located between Bagotville and Port-Alfred. It runs from the mouth of Ha! Ha! Bay to the edges of the Laurentian Wildlife Reserve. It is officially recognized as a salmon river by the federal government and is protected until it reaches the Bec-Scie Outdoors Centre (French: Centre plein-air Bec-Scie). It has ninety-two pools and about twenty potential spawning grounds.

Until it reaches the Laurentian Park, the river is maintained by the Mars River Sport Fishing Association (French: Association des pêcheurs sportifs de la Rivière-à-Mars Inc (APSRM)). It was founded in 1983 to protect, restore, and promote the Mars River's salmon population.

From 1894 to 1935, the Price Brothers Company ran a private club near the river. The construction of the Murailles Dam in 1930 and river driving until 1953 prevented the proliferation of salmon. The river was reseeded in 1976. It was closed to sport fishing in 1985, but was reopened again in 1992. A fishway was constructed after the 1996 deluge that destroyed the original one built in 1986.

Other than salmon, there are seven other fish species found in the river: brook trout, longnose dace, Northern sucker, white sucker, American eel, threespine stickleback, and northern pearl dace.

=== Hockey ===
The Jean-Claude-Tremblay Arena hosts the annual La Baie Pee-Wee hockey tournament. The arena was named after Jean-Claude Tremblay, a Bagotville native and former defenseman for the Montreal Canadiens and the Quebec Nordiques.

=== Parks ===
==== Ha! Ha! River Park ====
The Ha! Ha! River Park is located at the mouth of the Ha! Ha! River in the Grande-Baie sector. It was built three years after the 1996 floods. The park is best known for its main attraction, the Ha! Ha! Pyramid, which was created by artist Jean-Jules Soucy. The Place des Ha! Ha! is located on the river's eastern bank in the old riverbed. Many cultural events are held in this municipal park.

==== Mars Park ====
This park is located at the mouth of the Mars River along Mars Street in the Bagotville sector. It contains a six-kilometre pedestrian and bicycle path with a panoramic view of Ha! Ha! Bay.

==== Eucher Trail ====
Eucher (or Eusher) Trail is a walking path along the Philippe Cove and the main capes of the northern shore of Ha! Ha! Bay. The path runs at an altitude of 100 metres.

== Notable residents ==
- Louis de Gonzague Belley (1863–1930), politician
- Dean Bergeron (1969-), Paralympic athlete
- Paul-Edmond Gagnon (1909–1981), politician
- Jeannot Gilbert (1940-), hockey player
- Ghislain Harvey (1946-), politician
- Pierre Michaud (1936–2023), judge
- Gérard-Raymond Morin (1940-), politician
- Alfred Tremblay (Derfla) (1856–1921), journalist, professor, and poet
- Jean-Claude Tremblay (1939–1994), hockey player
- Valérie Maltais (1990-), Olympic athlete
- Orloge Simard (2012-), musical group, authors of the song "12 Pouces"
