= La Petite Rivière (Cami River tributary) =

- Location within Quebec

Location
- Country: Canada
- Province: Quebec
- Region: Saguenay-Lac-Saint-Jean
- Regional County Municipality: Le Fjord-du-Saguenay Regional County Municipality
- Municipalities: L'Anse-Saint-Jean and Rivière-Éternité

Physical characteristics
- Source: Lac non identifié
  - location: L'Anse-Saint-Jean
  - coordinates: 48.12069°N 70.71238°W
  - elevation: 489 m (1,604 ft)
- Mouth: Cami River
  - location: Rivière-Éternité
  - coordinates: 48.09028°N 70.63611°W
  - elevation: 330 m (1,080 ft)
- Length: 8.1 km (5.0 mi)
- Discharge
  - location: L'Anse-Saint-Jean

Basin features
- Tributaries
  - left: Outlet of "Lac de la Tente".

La Petite Rivière (French pronunciation: [la pətit ʁivjɛʁ], lit. 'The Little River') is a tributary of the Cami River, flowing in the unorganized territory of Lalemant and in the municipality from Rivière-Éternité, in the Fjord-du-Saguenay, in the administrative region of Saguenay-Lac-Saint-Jean, in the province of Quebec, in Canada. The course of "La Petite Rivière" crosses the zec du Lac-Brébeuf.

The valley of "La Petite Rivière" is served on most of its course by a forest road, for forestry and recreational tourism activities. Some secondary forest roads serve this valley.

Forestry is the main economic activity in the sector; recreational tourism, second.

The surface of "La Petite Rivière" is usually frozen from the beginning of December to the end of March, however the safe circulation on the ice is generally made from mid-December to mid-March.

== Geography ==
The main neighboring watersheds of "La Petite Rivière" are:

- north side: Lac de la Tente, Lac Belly, Lac Potvin, Brébeuf Lake, Lac des Cèdres, Éternity Lake, Éternité River, Truite Lake, Saguenay River;
- east side: Cami River, Saint-Jean River, Rivière à la Catin, Lac des Hauteurs;
- south side: Lac de la Grosse Femelle, Lac Charny, Lac Éloigné, Épinglette Stream, Malbaie River, Caribou brook, Desprez Lake, Porc-Épic River;
- west side: lac à la Boule, lac du Berger, lac Grand-Père, Ha! Ha! River, Bras d'Hamel, rivière à Mars.

"La Petite Rivière" rises at the confluence of an unidentified lake (length: 0.34 km (0.21 mi); altitude: 489 m (1,604 ft)) located between the mountains. This source is located at:

- 0.5 km (0.31 mi) southwest of a mountain peak which reaches 574 m (1,883 ft);
- 1.8 km (1.1 mi) east of Lac du Berger, which is a head water body of the Bras de Ross (Brébeuf Lake);
- 2.5 km (1.6 mi) north-west of "Lac de la Grosse Femelle";
- 6.6 km (4.1 mi) south-west of the confluence of "La Petite Rivière" and the Cami River;
- 10.8 km (6.7 mi) south-east of "Lac des Cèdres";
- 13.3 km (8.3 mi) north-east of the dike at the mouth of Lake Ha! Ha!;
- 13.6 km (8.5 mi) north-west of the confluence of the ruisseau à John and the Malbaie River.

From its source, the course of "La Petite Rivière" descends on 8.1 km (5.0 mi) in forest and mountainous areas, with a drop of 159 m (522 ft) according to the following segments:

- 0.6 km (0.37 mi) southward down a mountain, up to a bend in the river;
- 1.1 km (0.68 mi) to the east, to the outlet (coming from the north) of "Lac de la Tente";
- 3.2 km (2.0 mi) to the east in a deep valley, forming a detour south to the outlet (coming from the north) of a stream;
- 3.2 km (2.0 mi) to the east in a deep valley, forming a hook towards the south, to its mouth.

The "Petite Rivière" flows onto the west bank of the Cami River. This mouth is located at:

- 1.8 km (1.1 mi) southeast of Belly Lake;
- 4.6 km (2.9 mi) north-west of Desprez Lake which is the head lake of the Cami River;
- 9.5 km (5.9 mi) north of the confluence of John's Creek and the Malbaie River;
- 10.5 km (6.5 mi) south-west of the confluence of the Cami River with the Saint-Jean River;
- 24.8 km (15.4 mi) south-west of the village center of Rivière-Éternité;
- 36.4 km (22.6 mi) south-west of the confluence of the Saint-Jean River and the Saint-Jean Bay (Saguenay River);
- 49.1 km (30.5 mi) south-east of downtown Saguenay (city).

From the confluence of "La Petite Rivière", the current:

- follows the course of the Cami River on 15.8 km (9.8 mi) generally towards the northeast;
- follows the course of the Saint-Jean River on 37.7 km (23.4 mi) generally towards the northeast;
- crosses Anse Saint-Jean on 2.9 km (1.8 mi) to the north;
- follows the course of the Saguenay River on 42.8 km (26.6 mi) eastward to Tadoussac where it merges with the Saint Lawrence estuary.

== Toponymy ==
The toponym "La Petite Rivière" was formalized on November 9, 2000, by the Commission de toponymie du Québec.

== See also ==
- Le Fjord-du-Saguenay Regional County Municipality
- Lalemant
- Éternité River
- Zec du Lac-Brébeuf
- Cami River
- Saint-Jean River
- Saguenay River
- List of rivers of Quebec
