= Bras de Ross =

River in Quebec, Canada

- Location within Quebec

Location
- Country: Canada
- Province: Quebec
- Region: Saguenay-Lac-Saint-Jean
- Regional County Municipality: Le Fjord-du-Saguenay Regional County Municipality
- Municipalities: Rivière-Éternité

Physical characteristics
- Source
  - location: Rivière-Éternité
  - coordinates: 48.12835°N 70.73643°W
  - elevation: 438 m (1,437 ft)
- Mouth: Brébeuf Lake
  - location: Rivière-Éternité
  - coordinates: 48.19305°N 70.61861°W
  - elevation: 239 m (784 ft)
- Length: 21.6 km (13.4 mi)
- Discharge
  - location: Rivière-Éternité

Basin features
- Tributaries
  - left: (from the mouth) Outlet of Lac Bruno, outlet of "Lac de la Baie", outlet of "Lac de Sable", outlet of Lac Potvin, outlet of Lac Castor.
  - right: (from the mouth) Outlet of lac Pierre; outlet of Lac Benouche and "Petit lac Benouche"; outlet of a set of lakes such "Lac du Berger", "Lac à la Boule" and lac Long; outlet of a set of lakes.

The Bras de Ross (English: Ross's Arm) is a tributary of Brébeuf Lake, flowing in the municipality of Ferland-et-Boilleau and Rivière-Éternité, in the Le Fjord-du-Saguenay Regional County Municipality, in the administrative region of Saguenay–Lac-Saint-Jean, in the province of Quebec, in Canada. The lower part of the Ross Valley is integrated into the zec du Lac-Bébeuf.

The "Bras de Ross" Valley is served by Chemin du Lac-Brébeuf which serves the southwest shore of Brébeuf Lake, for forestry, agriculture and recreotourism activities. Some secondary forest roads serve this valley.

Forestry is the main economic activity in the sector; recreational tourism, second.

The surface of "Bras de Ross" is usually frozen from the beginning of December to the end of March, however the safe circulation on the ice is generally done from mid-December to mid-March.

== Geography ==
The main watersheds adjacent to "Bras de Ross" are:

- north side: lac Bruno, lac à la Balle, lac des Îlets, Brébeuf Lake ("anse à Bacalem" and "anse à la Balle"), Lac des Cèdres, Papinachois stream, Otis lake, Saguenay River;
- east side: Brébeuf Lake, Éternité Lake, Éternité River, Bailloquet Lake;
- south side: Pierre River, Pierre lake, Lac à la Lune, "Lac de la Rivière Pierre", "Lac des Canots";
- west side: Bras d'Hamel, Grand-Père lake, Méridé lake, Ha! Ha! River, rivière à Mars.

The "Bras de Ross" rises at the mouth of Lac du Berger (length: 1.4 km (0.87 mi); altitude: 438 m (1,437 ft)) in a valley between the mountains. This lake is fed on the south side by the outlet of "Lac en Trèfle", Lac Long and "Lac à la Boule". The mouth of "Lac du Berger" is located at:

- 5.6 km (3.5 mi) northeast of the course of the Ha! Ha! River;
- 8.6 km (5.3 mi) west of a curve in the course of the Cami River;
- 9.9 km (6.2 mi) south-west of "Lac des Cèdres";
- 10.1 km (6.3 mi) south-east of the center of the village of Ferland;
- 11.4 km (7.1 mi) south-west of the confluence of the Bras de Ross and Brébeuf Lake;
- 23.0 km (14.3 mi) south-east of the confluence of the Ha! Ha! and the Baie des Ha! Ha!.

From the mouth of "Lac du Berger", the course of "Bras de Ross" descends on 21.6 km (13.4 mi), according to a drop of 199 m (653 ft) according to the following segments:

Upper course of "Bras de Ross" (segment of 10.4 km (6.5 mi))

- 0.9 km (0.56 mi) north-west to a small lake (length: 0.4 km (0.25 mi); altitude: 410 m (1,350 ft)), then towards northeast by crossing it for 0.23 km (0.14 mi) to its mouth;
- 0.8 km (0.50 mi) north-east to the outlet (coming from the south-east) of two lakes;
- 4.0 km (2.5 mi) north-west to the outlet (coming from the south-west) of some lakes;
- 2.2 km (1.4 mi) north-east in a valley between two mountains and crossing on 0.3 km (0.19 mi) the southern part of Lake Potvin (length: 1.1 km (0.68 mi); altitude: 309 m (1,014 ft)), to the outlet (coming from the southeast) of Lake Benouche;
- 2.5 km (1.6 mi) towards the north-east by forming a curve towards the south-east to bypass a mountain and bending towards the north, until the outlet (coming from the west) of the "Lac de Sable";

Lower course of "Bras de Ross" (segment of 11.2 km (7.0 mi))

- 3.9 km (2.4 mi) towards the northeast in a deep valley by collecting the discharge (coming from the north) of a lake, by forming a curve towards the west to go around a mountain, by collecting the discharge (coming from the east) from a lake as well as the outlet (coming from the southwest) from a lake, to a stream (coming from the north);
- 1.1 km (0.68 mi) to the east by crossing a marsh area at the end of the segment, up to a stream (coming from the east);
- 3.6 km (2.2 mi) towards the north-east passing between two mountains, crossing three series of rapids and forming a curve towards the north-west, until the discharge (coming from the west) of a lake;
- 1.3 km (0.81 mi) to the east, forming a loop to the north and crossing an area of marsh, to the east shore of the lake?;
- 0.7 km (0.43 mi) east across the lake ? (altitude: 269 m (883 ft)) on its full length, to its mouth;
- 0.6 km (0.37 mi) east to its mouth.

The "Bras de Ross" pours into the bottom of a bay on the southwest shore of the western part of Brébeuf Lake. This mouth is located at:

- 3.2 km (2.0 mi) north-east of the hamlet "L'Écluse-à-Hilaire";
- 4.9 km (3.0 mi) south-east of the hamlet "Lac-à-la-Balle";
- 5.5 km (3.4 mi) south-west of a bay in Éternité Lake;
- 6.3 km (3.9 mi) west of the mouth of Brébeuf Lake;
- 7.0 km (4.3 mi) west of the confluence of the Cami river and the Saint-Jean River;
- 16.7 km (10.4 mi) south-west of the village center of Rivière-Éternité;
- 23.8 km (14.8 mi) south-west of the confluence of the Éternité River and the Baie Éternité (Saguenay River);
- 31.5 km (19.6 mi) south-west of the confluence of the Saint-Jean river and the Saint-Jean Bay (Saguenay River);
- 41.9 km (26.0 mi) south-east of downtown Saguenay (city).

From the confluence of "bras de Ross", the current:

- crosses Lac Brébeuf for 6.8 km (4.2 mi) to the east;
- follows the course of the Saint John River on 38.8 km (24.1 mi) generally towards the northeast;
- crosses Saint-Jean Bay on 2.9 km (1.8 mi) to the north;
- follows the course of the Saguenay River on 42.8 km (26.6 mi) eastward to Tadoussac where it merges with the Saint Lawrence estuary.

== Toponymy ==
The term "Ross" is a family name of English origin.

The toponym "bras de Ross" was formalized on December 5, 1968, by the Commission de toponymie du Québec.

== See also ==
- Le Fjord-du-Saguenay Regional County Municipality
- Ferland-et-Boilleau, a municipality
- Rivière-Éternité, a municipality
- Zec du Lac-Brébeuf, a controlled exploitation zone (zec)
- Brébeuf Lake
- Saint-Jean River
- Saguenay River
- List of rivers of Quebec
