= Épinglette Stream =

- Location within Quebec
- Native name: Ruisseau Épinglette (French)

Location
- Country: Canada
- Province: Quebec
- Region: Saguenay-Lac-Saint-Jean
- Regional County Municipality: Le Fjord-du-Saguenay Regional County Municipality
- Municipalities: L'Anse-Saint-Jean

Physical characteristics
- Source: Little unidentified lake
  - location: L'Anse-Saint-Jean
  - coordinates: 48.06278°N 70.48028°W
  - elevation: 773 m (2,536 ft)
- Mouth: Rivière à la Catin
  - location: L'Anse-Saint-Jean
  - coordinates: 48.15111°N 70.54028°W
  - elevation: 461 m (1,512 ft)
- Length: 15.3 km (9.5 mi)
- Discharge
  - location: L'Anse-Saint-Jean

Basin features
- Tributaries
  - right: Outlet of "lac Travers" and of "Petit lac Travers".

The "ruisseau Épinglette" (English: Épinglette stream) is a tributary of the Cami River, flowing in the municipality of L'Anse-Saint-Jean, in the Fjord-du-Saguenay, in the administrative region of Saguenay-Lac-Saint-Jean, in the province of Quebec, in Canada. The course of the "Épinglette steam" crosses the zec du Lac-Brébeuf.

The "lac à Épinglette" area is served by "Chemin du Lac-Travers". It is served indirectly by the "Chemin du Lac à la Catin" which connects to the west with the "Chemin du Lac Travers" and the "Chemin du Lac Desprez". The middle part of the rivière à la Catin valley is served by the Périgny road and the "Lac de la Souris road", for forestry and recreational tourism activities. The lower part is served by "Chemin du Lac Brébeuf". Some secondary forest roads serve this valley.

Forestry is the main economic activity in the sector; recreational tourism, second.

The surface of Lapel Creek is usually frozen from the beginning of December to the end of March, however safe circulation on the ice is generally done from mid-December to mid-March.

== Geography ==
The main watersheds adjacent to "Épinglette stream" are:

- north side: rivière à la Catin, bras à Pierre, Brébeuf Lake, Éternité Lake, Otis Lake, Saint-Jean River, Saguenay River;
- east side: Rivière à la Catin, Épinglette Lake, Bazile Lake, Bazile Creek Saint-Jean River, Emmuraillé Lake, Portage Creek;
- south side: Scott Lake, Porc-Épic Lake, Malbaie River, Malfait Lake;
- west side: John Creek, Cami River, Desprez Lake, Charny Lake, Ha! Ha! River, Huard River.

Épinglette stream rises at the mouth of an unidentified small lake (length: 0.1 km (0.062 mi); altitude: 773 m (2,536 ft)) in a deep valley. The mouth of this lake is located at:

- 2.7 km (1.7 mi) north of the course of the Malbaie River;
- 7.7 km (4.8 mi) north-west of the center of the hamlet "L’Épinglette-des-Lacs" which is on the west shore of Épinglette Lake;
- 7.8 km (4.8 mi) south of "Lac des Hauteurs";
- 6.3 km (3.9 mi) south-east of Desprez Lake;
- 9.3 km (5.8 mi) south-east of the confluence of "Épinglette stream" and Rivière à la Catin.

From its source, the course of the "Épinglette stream" descends on 15.3 km (9.5 mi) in forest and mountainous areas, with a drop of 312 km (194 mi) according to the following segments:

- 3.5 km (2.2 mi) towards the northeast by collecting the discharge (coming from the northwest) from an unidentified lake, to the discharge (coming from the northwest) from two lakes;
- 2.3 km (1.4 mi) towards the northeast, crossing a steep drop, to the outlet (coming from the northeast) of Lac Travers and Petit Lac Travers;
- 2.8 km (1.7 mi) by forming a small hook towards the west, then towards the north in a steep valley until a stream (coming from the east) of mountain;
- 4.8 km (3.0 mi) towards the north by winding and crossing an area of marsh in a deep valley, to the outlet (coming from the southwest) of an unidentified lake;
- 1.9 km (1.2 mi) north-east in the marsh area, then in the rapids area at the end of the segment, to its mouth.

Épinglette brook flows onto the south bank of the Cami River. This confluence is located at:

- 5.4 km (3.4 mi) north-west of the center of the hamlet of "L’Épinglette-des-Lacs";
- 10.8 km (6.7 mi) north of the course of the Malbaie River;
- 13.7 km (8.5 mi) south-east of the confluence of the rivière à la Catin with the Cami River;
- 14.6 km (9.1 mi) south-east of Desprez Lake;
- 14.7 km (9.1 mi) south-east of the mouth of the Brébeuf Lake (confluence with the Saint Jean River);
- 23.0 km (14.3 mi) south-east of the center of the village of Rivière-Éternité;
- 27.4 km (17.0 mi) south-west of the confluence of the Saint-Jean river and L'Anse-Saint-Jean, Quebec (Saguenay River);
- 58.9 km (36.6 mi) south-east of downtown Saguenay (city).

From de the mouth of "ruisseau Épinglette", the current:

- follows the course of the rivière à la Catin on 18.9 km (11.7 mi) towards the North;
- follows the course of the Cami River on 1.0 km (0.62 mi) towards the North;
- follows the course of the Saint-Jean River on 37.7 km (23.4 mi) generally towards the northeast;
- crosses L'Anse-Saint-Jean, Quebec for 2.9 km (1.8 mi) to the north;
- follows the course of the Saguenay River on 42.8 km (26.6 mi) eastward to Tadoussac where it merges with the Saint Lawrence Estuary.

== Toponymy ==
The term "Épinglette" (English: Pin) refers to a decorative badge affixed to a garment, normally at breast height. The pin can be a sign of belonging, honor or pride.

The toponym "Ruisseau Épinglette" was formalized on December 5, 1968, by the Commission de toponymie du Québec.

== Appendices ==
=== Related articles ===
- Le Fjord-du-Saguenay Regional County Municipality, a MRC
- L'Anse-Saint-Jean, a municipality
- Zec du Lac-au-Sable, a controlled exploitation zone (zec)
- Rivière à la Catin
- Cami River
- Saint-Jean River
- Saguenay River
- List of rivers of Quebec
