= Lac à la Catin =

Lake in Quebec, Canada

- Location in Quebec
- Location: L'Anse-Saint-Jean
- Coordinates: 48.02944°N 70.44556°W
- Lake type: Natural
- Primary inflows: Trois ruisseaux de montagne.
- Primary outflows: Rivière à la Catin
- Basin countries: Canada
- Max. length: 2.8 km (1.7 mi)
- Max. width: 0.4 km (0.25 mi)
- Surface elevation: 597 m (1,959 ft)

The Lac à la Catin is a fresh body of water in the watershed of the rivière à la Catin and the Saint-Jean River. This body of water is located in the municipality of L'Anse-Saint-Jean, in the Le Fjord-du-Saguenay Regional County Municipality, in the administrative region of Saguenay–Lac-Saint-Jean, in the province of Quebec, in Canada.

A few secondary forest roads including R0361 (south side of the lake) provide access to the Lac à la Catin watershed; these roads connect to route 381 (north-south direction) which runs along the Ha! Ha! River. These roads allow forestry and recreational tourism activities.

Forestry is the main economic activity in the sector; recreational tourism, second.

The surface of Lac à la Catin is usually frozen from the beginning of December to the end of March, however the safe circulation on the ice is generally done from mid-December to mid-March.

== Geography ==
The mouth of Lac à la Catin is located about 4.8 km (3.0 mi) north of the boundary of the administrative regions of Saguenay–Lac-Saint-Jean and Capitale-Nationale. The main watersheds neighboring Lac à la Catin are:

- north side: Rivière à la Catin, Bras à Pierre, Saint-Jean River, Éternité River, Saguenay River;
- east side: Lac de la Hauteur, Poulin Lake, Lac à Papa, Huard Lake, Bazile Lake (Mont-Élie);
- south side: Épinglette brook, Ouskyatou Lake, Scott Lake, Scott Creek, Malbaie River;
- west side: Épinglette brook, lac des Hauteurs, Cami River, Desprez Lake, Ha! Ha! River.

Lac à la Catin has a length of 2.8 km (1.7 mi) in the shape of a cucumber star, a maximum width of 0.4 km (0.25 mi), an altitude is 597 m (1,959 ft) and an area of . Its shape is broken by two peninsulas, one of which is attached to the north shore and the other is attached to the west shore (southern part of the lake). Its mouth is located to the northwest, at:

- 3.8 km (2.4 mi) west of a bay in Lac des Hauteurs;
- 3.9 km (2.4 mi) southwest of Lac Poulin;
- 4.0 km (2.5 mi) northwest of Lac Épinglette;
- 9.6 km (6.0 mi) north of the course of the Malbaie River;
- 13.8 km (8.6 mi) south-east of the confluence of Rivière à la Catin and Saint-Jean River;
- 29.0 km (18.0 mi) south-west of the confluence of the Saint-Jean River and the Saguenay River;
- 62.3 km (38.7 mi) south-east of downtown Saguenay (city).

From the confluence of Lac à la Catin, the current follows the course of:

- the rivière à la Catin on 22.3 km (13.9 mi) towards the North;
- the Cami River on 1.0 km (0.62 mi) towards the North;
- the Saint-Jean River on 37.7 km (23.4 mi) generally towards the northeast;
- L'Anse-Saint-Jean on 2.9 km (1.8 mi) towards the north;
- the Saguenay River on 42.8 km (26.6 mi) eastward to Tadoussac where it merges with the Saint Lawrence estuary.

== Toponymy ==
The toponym "Lac à la Catin" was formalized on December 5, 1968, by the Commission de toponymie du Québec.

== Appendices ==
=== Related articles ===
- MRC
- L'Anse-Saint-Jean, a municipality
- Rivière à la Catin
- Cami River
- Saint-Jean River
- Saguenay River
