= Pierre River (Brébeuf Lake) =

River in Saguenay-Lac-Saint-Jean (Quebec, Canada)

- Location within Quebec
- Native name: Rivière Pierre (French)

Location
- Country: Canada
- Province: Quebec
- Region: Saguenay-Lac-Saint-Jean
- Regional County Municipality: Le Fjord-du-Saguenay Regional County Municipality
- Municipalities: Ferland-et-Boilleau and Rivière-Éternité

Physical characteristics
- Source
  - location: Ferland-et-Boilleau
  - coordinates: 48.13247°N 70.70555°W
  - elevation: 440 m (1,440 ft)
- Mouth: Brébeuf Lake
  - location: Rivière-Éternité
  - coordinates: 48.16805°N 70.57611°W
  - elevation: 226 m (741 ft)
- Length: 15.2 km (9.4 mi)
- Discharge
  - location: Rivière-Éternité

Basin features
- Tributaries
  - left: (from the mouth) Outlet of an unidentified lake.
  - right: (from the mouth) Outlet of "Lac des Canots", outlet of "lac Raoul", outlet of "Lac du Cimetière".

The Rivière Pierre (English: Pierre River) is a tributary of Brébeuf Lake, flowing in the municipality of Ferland-et-Boilleau and ivière-Éternité, in the Fjord-du-Saguenay, in the administrative region of Saguenay-Lac-Saint-Jean, in the province of Quebec, in Canada. The lower part of the Pierre river valley is integrated into the zec du Lac-Brébeuf.

The Pierre river valley is served by a forest road that serves the southwest shore of the Brébeuf Lake, for forestry, agriculture and recreational tourism activities. Some secondary forest roads serve this valley.

Forestry is the main economic activity in the sector; recreational tourism, second.

The surface of the Pierre River is usually frozen from the beginning of December to the end of March, however the safe circulation on the ice is generally made from mid-December to mid-March.

== Geography ==
The main watersheds neighboring the Pierre River are:

- north side: Brébeuf Lake, Bras de Ross, Papinachois stream, Otis lake, Saguenay River;
- East side: Lac Brébeuf, Saint-Jean River, Cami River, rivière à la Catin;
- south side: Lac des Canots, Lac Thérèse, Cami River, Lac de la Montagne;
- west side: lac Benouche, Bras de Ross, Potvin lake, Papinachois stream, Ha! Ha! River, rivière à Mars.

The Pierre River takes its source at the confluence of two mountain streams (altitude: 440 m (1,440 ft)) in a deep valley. This source is located at:

- 0.6 km (0.37 mi) west of a mountain peak which reaches 544 m (1,785 ft);
- 1.1 km (0.68 mi) northeast of a curve of the Bras de Ross;
- 10.4 km (6.5 mi) south-east of the confluence of the Pierre river and the Brébeuf Lake.
- 17 km (11 mi) south of Otis Lake;
- 19.0 km (11.8 mi) south of the center of the village of Lac-Goth;
- 24.1 km (15.0 mi) south-east of the confluence of the Cailles stream (draining Lac Otis) and the Saguenay River.

From its source, the course of the Pierre river descends on 15.2 km (9.4 mi) according to the following segments:

- 2.3 km (1.4 mi) towards the north-west on 0.4 km (0.25 mi) up to a bend in the river, then towards the north-east in the marsh zone by collecting a stream (coming from the southeast), to the outlet (coming from the southeast) of the Lac du Cimetière;
- 3.3 km (2.1 mi) north-west passing west of a mountain whose summit reaches 495 m (1,624 ft) to a stream (coming from the west);
- 1.5 km (0.93 mi) east in a steep valley, to a stream (coming from the south);
- 2.8 km (1.7 mi) north-east in a steep valley, to a stream (coming from the north-west) whose mouth is in the marsh area;
- 1.2 km (0.75 mi) to the east, bending to the northeast, to the outlet (coming from the north) of a lake;
- 0.8 km (0.50 mi) towards the south-east, crossing the lake ? (length: 1.5 km (0.93 mi); altitude: 259 m (850 ft)) to its mouth;
- 0.7 km (0.43 mi) eastwards to the outlet (coming from the south) of "Lac des Canots";
- 2.6 km (1.6 mi) to the east, collecting the discharge (coming from the north) of a lake, to its mouth.

The Pierre River flows on the south bank of Anse à Taschereau in the eastern part of Lac Brébeuf. This mouth is located at:

- 2.1 km (1.3 mi) west of the mouth of Brébeuf Lake;
- 3.0 km (1.9 mi) west of the confluence of the Cami River and the Saint-Jean River;
- 7.0 km (4.3 mi) east of the hamlet "L'Écluse-à-Hilaire";
- 15.5 km (9.6 mi) south-west of the village center of Rivière-Éternité;
- 29.1 km (18.1 mi) south-west of the confluence of the Saint-Jean River and Saint-Jean Bay (Saguenay River);
- 4.5 km (2.8 mi) south of a bay on Éternité Lake;
- 46.5 km (28.9 mi) south-east of downtown Saguenay (city).

From the confluence of the Pierre River, the current:

- crosses Brébeuf Lake for 2.5 km (1.6 mi) to the east;
- follows the course of the Saint-Jean River on 38.8 km (24.1 mi) generally towards the northeast;
- crosses Saint-Jean Bay on 2.9 km (1.8 mi) towards the north;
- follows the course of the Saguenay River on 42.8 km (26.6 mi) eastward to Tadoussac where it merges with the Saint Lawrence estuary.

== Toponymy ==
The toponym "rivière Pierre" was formalized on June 29, 1983, by the Commission de toponymie du Québec.

== See also ==
- Le Fjord-du-Saguenay Regional County Municipality
- Ferland-et-Boilleau, a municipality
- Rivière-Éternité, a municipality
- Zec du Lac-Brébeuf, a controlled exploitation zone (zec)
- Brébeuf Lake
- Saint-Jean River
- Saguenay River
- List of rivers of Quebec
