= Cami River =

- Location within Quebec

Location
- Country: Canada
- Province: Quebec
- Region: Capitale-Nationale and Saguenay-Lac-Saint-Jean
- Regional County Municipality: Le Fjord-du-Saguenay Regional County Municipality
- Municipalities: L'Anse-Saint-Jean

Physical characteristics
- Source: Desprez Lake
  - location: Lalemant
  - coordinates: 48.04902°N 70.63349°W
  - elevation: 425 m (1,394 ft)
- Mouth: Saint-Jean River
  - location: Rivière-Éternité
  - coordinates: 48.15861°N 70.53889°W
  - elevation: 229 m (751 ft)
- Length: 22.5 km (14.0 mi)
- Discharge
  - location: Rivière-Éternité

Basin features
- Tributaries
  - left: (from the mouth) Décharge du lac à la Dyne, décharge d’un lac non identifié, décharge du lac du Détour et du lac de la Montagne, décharge du lac Morin, décharge d’un lac non identifié, La Petite Rivière, décharge du lac de la Grosse Femelle, décharge du lac Éloigné et du Lac en Poire, décharge du lac Jumeau.
  - right: (from the mouth) bras à Pierre, rivière à la Catin, ruisseau non identifié, décharge d’un lac Stolan, décharge du lac René, décharge d’un ensemble de lacs dont Antonelli, à Marc et à Vandal, décharge d’un ensemble de lacs et d’une zone de marais, décharge du lac à Fournel, décharge du lac à Aurel, décharge d’un lac non identifié, décharge du lac Isoland.

The Cami river is a tributary of the Saint-Jean River, flowing in the municipality of Lalemant, Hébertville and Rivière-Éternité, in the Fjord-du-Saguenay, in the administrative region of Saguenay-Lac-Saint-Jean, in the province of Quebec, in Canada. The course of the Cami river crosses the zec du Lac-au-Sable.

The Cami river valley is served along its entire length by the Lac-Desprez road, for forestry and recreational tourism activities. Some secondary forest roads serve this valley.

Forestry is the main economic activity in the sector; recreational tourism, second.

The surface of the Cami River is usually frozen from the beginning of December to the end of March, however the safe circulation on the ice is generally made from mid-December to mid-March.

== Geography ==
The main watersheds neighboring the Cami River are:

- north side: Bailloquet Lake, Otis Lake, Périgny Lake, Éternité River, Lac à la Truite, Saguenay River;
- east side: Saint-Jean river, Quarante-Quatre lake;
- south side: rivière à la Catin, Épinglette Stream, Malbaie River, Desprez Lake, Porc-Épic River;
- west side: Brébeuf Lake, Lac des Canots, Papinachois stream, Ha! Ha! River, rivière à Mars.

The Cami River takes its source at the confluence of Desprez Lake (length: 2.8 km (1.7 mi); altitude: 425 m (1,394 ft)) in a deep valley. This source is located at:

- 0.9 km (0.56 mi) south-east of a mountain peak which reaches 692 m (2,270 ft);
- 3.3 km (2.1 mi) north-east of a curve of the course of ruisseau à John;
- 5.2 km (3.2 mi) north of a curve in the course of the Malbaie River;
- 10.9 km (6.8 mi) south-west of a curve of the course of the rivière à la Catin;
- 13.7 km (8.5 mi) south of the mouth of Brébeuf Lake;
- 14.1 km (8.8 mi) south-west of the confluence of the Cami river and the Saint-Jean River.

From its source, the course of the Cami River descends on 22.5 km (14.0 mi) in forested and mountainous areas, with a drop of 196 m (643 ft) according to the following segments:

Upper course of the Cami River (segment of 10.0 km (6.2 mi))

- 1.7 km (1.1 mi) to the northeast by collecting a discharge (coming from the west) from Isolation Lake, to a bend in the river, corresponding to a stream (coming from the southeast);
- 1.3 km (0.81 mi) to the north in the marsh area, collecting the discharge from Lac Éloigné and Lac en Poire, as well as passing east of a mountain whose summit reaches 469 m (1,539 ft), to a bend in the river;
- 2.7 km (1.7 mi) north-west in the marsh area to the outlet (coming from the south-west) of a group of lakes;
- 1.0 km (0.62 mi) towards the northwest by collecting the discharge (coming from the south) of the Lac de la Grosse Femelle, up to La Petite Rivière (coming from the west);
- 3.3 km (2.1 mi) towards the northeast by forming a large curve at the start of the segment to go around a mountain whose summit reaches 499 m (1,637 ft) and collecting the discharge (coming from the north (west) of a few lakes, as well as the outlet (coming from the southwest) of Lac Aurel, up to a outlet (coming from the west) of Lac à Fournel;

Lower course of the Cami River (segment of 12.5 km (7.8 mi))

- 2.2 km (1.4 mi) towards the north in a deep valley, forming a curve towards the east at the start of the segment, up to a stream (coming from the south-east);
- 3.2 km (2.0 mi) north-west in a deep valley and crossing some rapids, up to a stream (coming from the north-west);
- 2.8 km (1.7 mi) north-east across a few rapids to the outlet (coming from the north-west) of a lake;
- 1.9 km (1.2 mi) towards the northeast in a deep valley, crossing some rapids and bending towards the north;
- 1.4 km (0.87 mi) north-east, up to the confluence of the rivière à la Catin (coming from the south-east);
- 1.0 km (0.62 mi) north on a plain, to its mouth.

The Cami river flows on the south bank of the Saint-Jean River. This mouth is located at:

- 0.9 km (0.56 mi) north-east of the mouth of the Brébeuf Lake (confluence with the Saint Jean River);
- 14.3 km (8.9 mi) south-west of the village center of Rivière-Éternité;
- 26.7 km (16.6 mi) south-west of the confluence of the Saint-Jean River and Anse Saint-Jean (Saguenay River);
- 4.5 km (2.8 mi) south of a bay on Éternity Lake;
- 48.9 km (30.4 mi) south-east of downtown Saguenay (city).

From the confluence of the Cami river, the current:

- follows the course of the Saint-Jean River (Saguenay River tributary) on 37.7 km (23.4 mi) generally towards the northeast;
- crosses Anse Saint-Jean for 2.9 km (1.8 mi) to the north;
- follows the course of the Saguenay River on 42.8 km (26.6 mi) eastward to Tadoussac where it merges with the Estuary of Saint Lawrence.
- 30.1 km (18.7 mi) west of Tadoussac.

== Toponymy ==
The toponym "Cami river" was formalized on June 29, 1983, by the Commission de toponymie du Québec.

== Appendices ==
=== Related articles ===
- Le Fjord-du-Saguenay Regional County Municipality
- Lalemant, a TNO
- Hébertville, a municipality
- Rivière-Éternité, a municipality
- Zec du Lac-au-Sable, a controlled exploitation zone
- Desprez Lake
- Brébeuf Lake
- La Petite Rivière
- Rivière à la Catin
- Saint-Jean River
- Saguenay River
- List of rivers of Quebec
