= Bras à Pierre =

River in L'Anse-Saint-Jean, Canada

- Location within Quebec
- Etymology: a

Location
- Country: Canada
- Province: Quebec
- Region: Saguenay-Lac-Saint-Jean
- Regional County Municipality: Le Fjord-du-Saguenay Regional County Municipality
- Municipalities: Ferland-et-Boilleau and Rivière-Éternité

Physical characteristics
- Source: Streams in marsh area
  - location: L'Anse-Saint-Jean
  - coordinates: 48.11009°N 70.43423°W
  - elevation: 368 m (1,207 ft)
- Mouth: Rivière Saint-Jean
  - location: L'Anse-Saint-Jean
  - coordinates: 48.16°N 70.410845°W
  - elevation: 174 m (571 ft)
- Length: 9.0 km (5.6 mi)
- Discharge
  - location: L'Anse-Saint-Jean

The Bras à Pierre is a tributary of the Saint-Jean river, flowing in the municipality of L'Anse-Saint-Jean, in the Le Fjord-du-Saguenay Regional County Municipality, in the administrative region of Saguenay–Lac-Saint-Jean, in the province from Quebec, to Canada.

The valley of "Bras à Pierre" (English: Pierre's arm) is served by the Périgny road for forestry, agriculture and recreational tourism activities. Some secondary forest roads serve this valley.

Forestry is the main economic activity in the sector; recreational tourism activities, second; agriculture in third. This valley contains some dwellings distributed in small deforested areas.

The surface of "Bras à Pierre" is usually frozen from the beginning of December to the end of March, however the safe circulation on the ice is generally done from mid-December to mid-March.

== Geography ==
The main watersheds neighboring the "Bras à Pierre" are:

- north side: Saint-Jean River, Emmuraillé Lake, Éternité River, Saguenay River;
- east side: Patrice-Fortin stream, Portage River, Petit Saguenay River, ruisseau de la sucrerie (sugar mill stream), Saint Lawrence River;
- south side: Bazile lake, Chouinard stream, Malbaie River, Noire River, "lac de la Hauteur" (Height lake);
- west side: Saint-Jean River, Rivière à la Catin, Brébeuf Lake, Cami River, Ha! Ha! River.

The "Bras à Pierre" originates in the marsh area (length: 2.7 km (1.7 mi); maximum width: 0.4 km (0.25 mi))) between the mountains in the northern part of the Rivière à la Catin. This marsh area is fed by a few mountain streams. This source of the watercourse is located at:

- 1.0 km (0.62 mi) north of the course of the Rivière à la Catin;
- 1.9 km (1.2 mi) north of the hamlet "Le Bras-du-Suroît";
- 4.6 km (2.9 mi) west of a mountain peak reaching 858 m (2,815 ft);
- 4.7 km (2.9 mi) north-west of a mountain peak reaching 893 m (2,930 ft);
- 6.6 km (4.1 mi) south of the confluence of the "Bras à Pierre" and the Saint-Jean River.

From the mouth of its source, the course of "Bras à Pierre" descends on 9.0 km (5.6 mi), according to a drop in level of 194 m (636 ft) according to the following segments:

- 3.0 km (1.9 mi) towards the north especially in the marsh area in a valley in a valley surrounded by high mountains, collecting the discharge (coming from the west) of a small lake, as well as the discharge (from the east) from another small lake, to a stream (from the east);
- 0.4 km (0.25 mi) westward, to a stream (coming from the west);
- 5.6 km (3.5 mi) towards the north in a valley between the mountains and forming a hook towards the west and a loop towards the east at the end of the segment, up to the mouth.

Pierre's arm spills out onto the south bank of the Saint-Jean River. This mouth is located at:

- 3.9 km (2.4 mi) south-west of the hamlet "La Vallée-d'Amont";
- 10.1 km (6.3 mi) east of Brébeuf Lake;
- 10.8 km (6.7 mi) south-east of the village center of Rivière-Éternité;
- 16.3 km (10.1 mi) south of the confluence of the Éternité River and the Éternité Bay (Saguenay River);
- 18.2 km (11.3 mi) south-west of the confluence of the Saint-Jean River and Anse Saint-Jean (Saguenay River).

From the confluence of "Bras à Pierre", the current:

- follows the course of the Saint-Jean River on 26.0 km (16.2 mi) generally towards the northeast;
- crosses Anse Saint-Jean on 2.9 km (1.8 mi) to the north;
- follows the course of the Saguenay River on 42.8 km (26.6 mi) eastward to Tadoussac where it merges with the Estuary of Saint Lawrence.

== Toponymy ==
The term "Pierre" is a male given name.

The toponym "Bras à Pierre" was formalized on December 5, 1968, by the Commission de toponymie du Québec.

== See also ==
- Le Fjord-du-Saguenay Regional County Municipality
- L'Anse-Saint-Jean
- Saint-Jean River
- Saguenay River
- List of rivers of Quebec
