= Rivière à la Catin =

River in Canada

- Location within Quebec

Location
- Country: Canada
- Province: Quebec
- Region: Saguenay-Lac-Saint-Jean
- Regional County Municipality: Le Fjord-du-Saguenay Regional County Municipality
- Municipalities: L'Anse-Saint-Jean and Rivière-Éternité

Physical characteristics
- Source: Lac à la Catin
  - location: L'Anse-Saint-Jean
  - coordinates: 48.04069°N 70.45467°W
  - elevation: 597 m (1,959 ft)
- Mouth: Cami River
  - location: Rivière-Éternité
  - coordinates: 48.15111°N 70.54028°W
  - elevation: 230 m (750 ft)
- Length: 22.3 km (13.9 mi)
- Discharge
  - location: L'Anse-Saint-Jean

Basin features
- Tributaries
  - left: (from the mouth) Outlet of lac Trouvé, outlet of Lac des Hauteurs, outlet of unidentified lake, ruisseau de montagne, ruisseau de montagne, Épinglette Stream and outlet of "Lac à Lionel".
  - right: (from the mouth) Outlet of an unidentified lake, outlet of "Lac de la Souris", outlet of a set of unidentified lakes, outlet of lac Solitaire.

The rivière à la Catin is a tributary of the Cami River, flowing in the municipality of L'Anse-Saint-Jean and Rivière-Éternité, in the Fjord-du-Saguenay, in the administrative region of Saguenay–Lac-Saint-Jean, in the province from Quebec, to Canada. The course of the Catin river crosses the zec du Lac-Brébeuf.

The lac à Catin area is served by Chemin du Lac à la Catin which connects to the west with Chemin du Lac Travers and Chemin du Lac Desprez. The middle part of the Catin river valley is served by the Périgny road and the Lac de la Souris road, for forestry and recreational tourism activities. The lower part is served by Chemin du Lac Brébeuf. Some secondary forest roads serve this valley.

Forestry is the main economic activity in the sector; recreational tourism, second.

The surface of the Catin River is usually frozen from the beginning of December to the end of March, however the safe circulation on the ice is generally made from mid-December to mid-March.

== Geography ==
The main watersheds adjacent to the Catin River are:

- north side: Brébeuf Lake, Éternité Lake, Otis Lake, Éternité River, Saguenay River;
- east side: Saint-Jean River, Quarante-Quatre lake, Portage stream, Poulin lake;
- south side: lac à la Catin, épinglette Stream, Épinglette lake, Malbaie River, Bazile Lake;
- west side: Épinglette Stream (Laplet pin brook), Cami River, Desprez Lake, Charny lake, Ha! Ha! River, Huard River.

The Catin river rises at the mouth of Lac à la Catin (length: 2.8 km (1.7 mi); altitude: 597 m (1,959 ft)) in a deep valley. This lake is surrounded by Mont du Saumon (816 m (2,677 ft)), Mont du Colibri (861 m (2,825 ft)) and Mont Pin (737 m (2,418 ft)). The mouth of this lake is located at:

- 2.3 km (1.4 mi) south-west of the center of the hamlet "Les Trois-Monts";
- 4.5 km (2.8 mi) north-west of the center of the hamlet "L’Épinglette-des-Lacs";
- 7.2 km (4.5 mi) north-west of "Lac Bazile";
- 9.5 km (5.9 mi) north of the course of the Malbaie River;
- 1.2 km (0.75 mi) south-east of the mouth of Brébeuf Lake;
- 13.8 km (8.6 mi) south-east of the confluence of the Catin river and the Cami River.

From its source, the course of the Catin river descends on 22.3 km (13.9 mi) in forest and mountainous areas, with a drop of 247 m (810 ft) according to the following segments:

Upper course of the Cami river (segment of 11.4 km (7.1 mi))

- 3.4 km (2.1 mi) to the northwest by collecting the outlet (coming from the northeast) from Lac Solitaire and the outlet (coming from the south) from Lac à Lionel, to brook Pin (from the southwest);
- 3.4 km (2.1 mi) towards the northeast crossing three zones of rapids, passing to the northwest of a mountain whose summit reaches 657 m (2,156 ft), turning a bend of river at the end of the segment, up to the outlet (coming from the south-east) of a mountain stream draining in particular the Mont de l'Ours (altitude:962 m (3,156 ft));
- 2.2 km (1.4 mi) towards the north almost always in rapids in a deep valley and forming a hook of 0.3 km (0.19 mi) towards the west, until the discharge (coming from the northeast) of a few lakes;
- 2.4 km (1.5 mi) westwards, to the outlet of "Lac de la Souris";

Lower course of the Cami river (segment of 10.9 km (6.8 mi))

- 4.1 km (2.5 mi) to the west, forming a large curve to the south, crossing an area of marsh, then a long area of rapids, up to the discharge (coming from the southwest) from the "Lac des Hauteurs";
- 3.0 km (1.9 mi) towards the north-west crossing several zones of rapids until a stream (coming from the east) which corresponds to a zone of marsh;
- 1.9 km (1.2 mi) north-west to the outlet (coming from the south) of "Lac Trouvé";
- 1.9 km (1.2 mi) towards the north-west entirely in the area of rapids in a steep valley, to its mouth.

The Catin river flows on the south bank of the Cami River. This confluence is located at:

- 0.8 km (0.50 mi) south of the confluence of the Cami River (confluence with the Saint-Jean River);
- 1.2 km (0.75 mi) south-east of the mouth of the Brébeuf Lake (confluence with the Saint Jean River);
- 14.9 km (9.3 mi) south-west of the village center of Rivière-Éternité;
- 27.1 km (16.8 mi) south-west of the confluence of the Saint-Jean River and L'Anse-Saint-Jean (Saguenay River);
- 5.4 km (3.4 mi) south of a bay on Éternité Lake;
- 49.1 km (30.5 mi) south-east of downtown Saguenay (city).

From the confluence of the Catin river, the current:

- follows the course of the Cami River on 1.0 km (0.62 mi) towards the North;
- follows the course of the Saint-Jean River (Saguenay River tributary) on 37.7 km (23.4 mi) generally towards the northeast;
- crosses L'Anse-Saint-Jean on 2.9 km (1.8 mi) to the north;
- follows the course of the Saguenay River on 42.8 km (26.6 mi) eastward to Tadoussac where it merges with the Estuary of Saint Lawrence.

== Toponymy ==
The term "Catin" refers to a doll (toy) in French.

The toponym "Rivière à la Catin" was formalized on December 5, 1968, by the Commission de toponymie du Québec.

== Appendices ==
=== Related articles ===
- Le Fjord-du-Saguenay Regional County Municipality
- L'Anse-Saint-Jean, a municipality
- Rivière-Éternité, a municipality
- Zec du Lac-au-Sable, a ZEC
- Épinglette Stream
- Cami River
- Saint-Jean River
- Saguenay River
- List of rivers of Quebec
