= Zec de la Rivière-Saint-Jean-du-Saguenay =

- Location within Quebec
- Location: Canada, Quebec, Le Fjord-du-Saguenay Regional County Municipality
- Nearest city: L'Anse-Saint-Jean
- Coordinates: 48°13′25″N 70°13′54″W
- Area: Length of 12.2 kilometres (7.6 mi) on the Saint-Jean River (Saguenay)
- Established: 1994

Zec de la Rivière-Saint-Jean-du-Saguenay is a controlled harvesting zone (zone d'exploitation contrôlée; Zec) in Quebec, Canada. It is in the municipality of L'Anse-Saint-Jean, in Le Fjord-du-Saguenay Regional County Municipality (RCM), in the administrative region of Saguenay–Lac-Saint-Jean.

The Zec de la Rivière-Saint-Jean-du-Saguenay administers some segments of Saint-Jean River, while the Zec de l'Anse-Saint-Jean administers public lands on forested territory around the river.

== Toponymy ==
The toponym "Zec de la Rivière-Saint-Jean-du-Saguenay" was officialized on October 7, 1994 at the Bank of place names of Commission de toponymie du Québec (Geographical Names Board of Quebec).

== See also ==
=== Related articles ===
- Zec de l'Anse-Saint-Jean
- L'Anse-Saint-Jean, municipality
- Saint-Jean River
- Saint-Jean Bay, a bay
- Saguenay River
- Le Fjord-du-Saguenay Regional County Municipality
- Saguenay-Lac-Saint-Jean, administrative region of Quebec
- Parc national du Fjord-du-Saguenay
- Zone d'exploitation contrôlée (controlled harvesting zone) (ZEC)

== Attachment ==
=== External links ===
- Official website of "Zec de la Rivière-Saint-Jean-du-Saguenay".
- Official website of municipality L'Anse Saint-Jean
