= Cap Éternité =

Mountain in Quebec, Canada

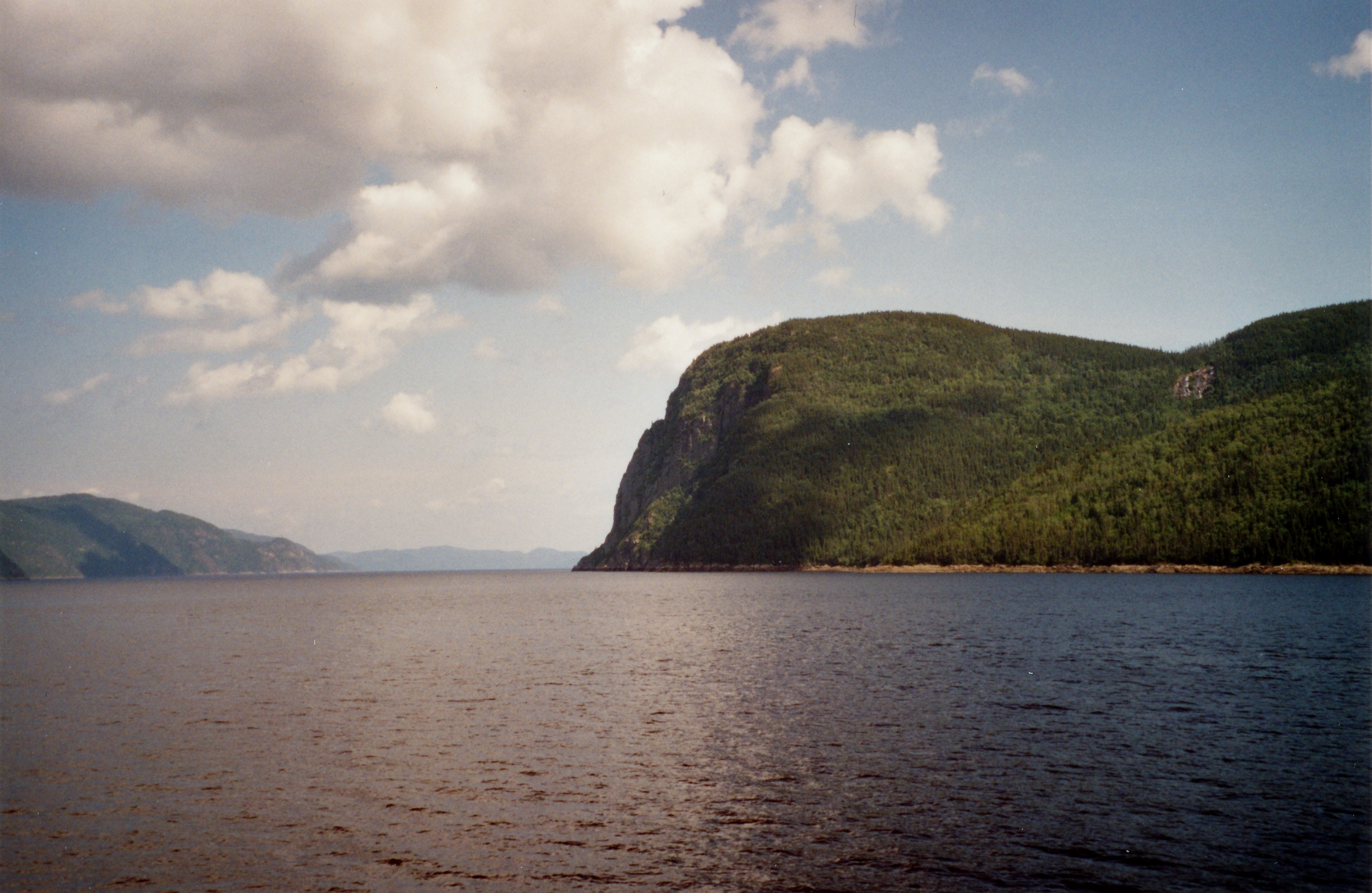
- View of Cap Éternité from the upstream course of the Saguenay River.

Highest point
- Elevation: 347 m (1,138 ft)
- Coordinates: 48°18′20″N 70°17′26″W

Geography
- Country: Canada
- Province: Quebec
- Region: Saguenay-Lac-Saint-Jean
- Parent range: Laurentian Plateau

Geology
- Mountain type: Cliff

Cap Éternité is a mountain in the municipality of Rivière-Éternité, the Le Fjord-du-Saguenay Regional County Municipality, in the administrative region of Saguenay-Lac-Saint-Jean, in Quebec, Canada. It overlooks, to the southwest, Éternité Bay while to the west is Cap Trinité. Reaching an altitude of 347 m (1,138 ft), it is part of Saguenay Fjord National Park.

The name of the cape was made official on December 5, 1968. To the west of the bay, the Éternité River gave its name to the municipality of Rivière-Éternité.

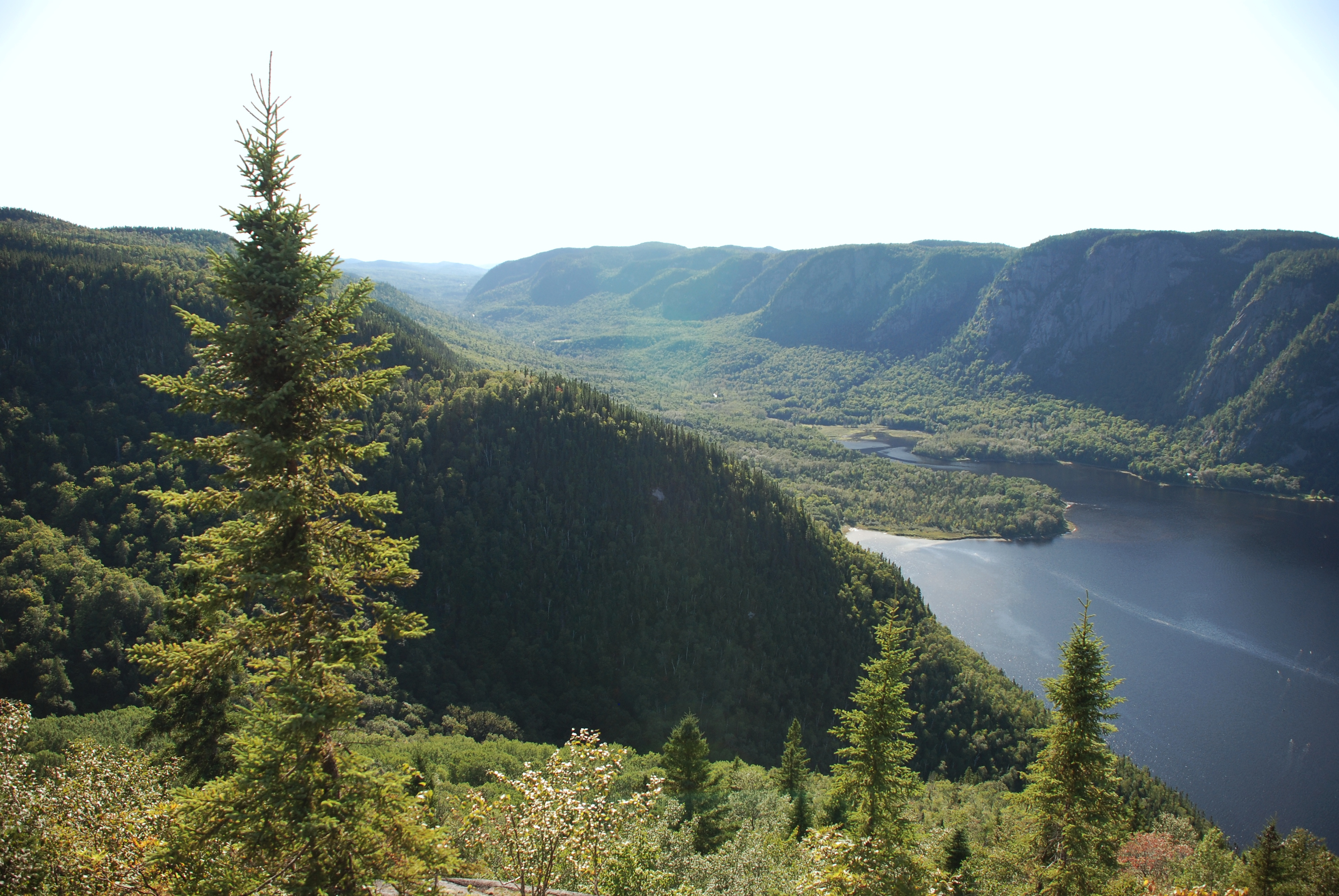
View of Éternité Bay from Cap Éternité

Its impressive rock mass and steep cliffs make it a major tourist attraction site in the Saguenay Fjord National Park. Cape Eternity inspired painters, poets and writers, including Charles Gill (1871–1918) and William Chapman (1850–1917).
