= Desprez Lake =

Lake in Quebec, Canada

- Location within Quebec
- Location: Lalemant, Quebec, Canada
- Coordinates: 48.04139°N 70.64611°W
- Type: Natural
- Primary inflows: ruisseau à John
- Max. length: 2.8 km (1.7 mi)
- Max. width: 0.4 km (0.25 mi)

The Lac Desprez is a fresh body of water in the watershed of ruisseau à John and Malbaie River. This body of water is located in the unorganized territory of Lalemant, in the Le Fjord-du-Saguenay Regional County Municipality, in the administrative region of Saguenay–Lac-Saint-Jean, in the province of Quebec, in Canada.

A few secondary forest roads allow access to the Lac Desprez watershed; these roads connect to route 381 (north–south direction) which runs along the Ha! Ha! River. These roads allow forestry and recreational tourism activities.

Forestry is the main economic activity in the sector; recreational tourism, second.

The surface of the Rivière des Cèdres is usually frozen from the beginning of December to the end of March, however the safe circulation on the ice is generally made from mid-December to mid-March.

== Geography ==
Lac Desprez is located about 4.8 km (3.0 mi) north of the boundary of the administrative regions of Saguenay-Lac-Saint-Jean and Capitale-Nationale. The main hydrographic slopes near Lac Desprez are:

- north side: Lac Charny, Lac Éloigné, Brébeuf Lake, Pierre Lake, lac des Cèdres, Saguenay River;
- East side: Lac Travers, Cami River, Épinglette Stream, rivière à la Catin;
- south side: ruisseau à John, Malbaie River;
- west side: ruisseau à John, Huard Lake, Huard River, Ha! Ha! River, Lake Ha! Ha!.

Lac Desprez has a length of 2.8 km (1.7 mi) in the shape of a cucumber star, a maximum width of 0.4 km (0.25 mi), an altitude is 425 m (1,394 ft) and an area of . Its mouth is located to the northwest, at:

- 3.0 km (1.9 mi) west of the mouth of the Cami River head lake;
- 3.8 km (2.4 mi) north-east of the confluence of ruisseau à John and Malbaie River;
- 8.7 km (5.4 mi) west of Huard Lake;
- 15.9 km (9.9 mi) south of Brébeuf Lake;

north of the center of the village of Ferland in the municipality of Ferland-et-Boilleau;

- 52.6 km (32.7 mi) south-east of downtown Saguenay (city);
- 57.4 km (35.7 mi) north-east of the confluence of the Malbaie River and the Saint Lawrence River.

From the mouth of Lac Desprez, the current:

- descends the course of ruisseau à John on 4.4 km (2.7 mi) towards the southeast;
- descends the course of the Malbaie River over to the east which flows onto the northwest bank of the Saint Lawrence River.

== Toponymy ==
The term "Desprez" constitutes a family name designating a place of provenance: "the meadows", itself coming from Latin "pratum". The toponym "Lac Desprez" was formalized on December 12, 1985, by the Commission de toponymie du Québec.

== See also ==
- Le Fjord-du-Saguenay Regional County Municipality
- Lalemant, an unorganized territory
- Ruisseau à John
- Malbaie River
