= Otis Lake (Saint-Félix-d'Otis) =

Lake in Quebec, Canada

- Location in Quebec
- Location: Rivière-Éternité
- Coordinates: 48.30028°N 70.64694°W
- Lake type: Natural
- Primary inflows: Outlet of lac Valérie, ruisseau Nazaire, outlet of lac Simard, outlet of lac Goth, outlet of "lac de la Souris".
- Primary outflows: Ruisseau aux Cailles
- Basin countries: Canada
- Max. length: 6.2 km (3.9 mi)
- Max. width: 3.3 km (2.1 mi)
- Surface elevation: 213 m (699 ft)

The lac Otis is a body of water tributary of the southern slope of the Saguenay River via the "ruisseau aux Cailles". It is located in the municipality of Saint-Félix-d'Otis, in the Le Fjord-du-Saguenay Regional County Municipality from the administrative region Saguenay–Lac-Saint-Jean, in the province of Quebec, in Canada.

The southern part of Lake Otis is served by route 170, that is the main street (east-west direction) which passes to the village of the hamlet Lac-Goth and to the village of Saint-Félix-d'Otis going west. A few other secondary forest roads serve the lake sector for forestry and recreational tourism activities. Several dozen chalets are set up, especially around the south-eastern bay where the village of Saint-Félix-d'Otis and the north-eastern bay are located.

Vacationing is the main economic activity in the sector; forestry, second.

The surface of Lake Otis is usually frozen from the end of November to the beginning of April, however the safe circulation on the ice is generally done from mid-December to the end of March.

== Geography ==
The main watersheds near Lake Otis are:

- north side: Cailles stream, Rivière à la Croix, Saguenay River;
- east side: Rivière à la Croix, Lac à la Croix, Éternity River, Saint-Jean River, Saguenay River;
- south side: Brébeuf Lake, Saint-Jean River, Papinachois stream, Pierre River, Catin river;
- west side: Saguenay River, Baie des Ha! Ha!.

Lake Otis has a length of 6.2 km (3.9 mi) in the shape of a boat anchor, a maximum width of 3.3 km (2.1 mi), an altitude is 213 m (699 ft) and an area of .

Otis Lake follows the shape of a hook, the top of which is the village bay and the end of the hook being the Anse à Pierre.

The mouth of Otis Lake is located in a bay northwest of the lake, at:

- 1.2 km (0.75 mi) north of the center of the hamlet of Lac-Goth;
- 3.2 km (2.0 mi) south of the confluence of the "ruisseau aux Cailles" and the Saguenay River;
- 6.2 km (3.9 mi) north-west of the village center of Saint-Félix-d'Otis;
- 9.5 km (5.9 mi) north-east of the "Baie de la Sauvagesse" du Brébeuf Lake;
- 13.6 km (8.5 mi) north-east of the confluence of the Ha! Ha! River And Saguenay River;
- 31.5 km (19.6 mi) east of downtown Saguenay (city);
- 74 km (46 mi) west of downtown Tadoussac.

From the mouth of Lake Otis, the current descends the "ruisseau aux Cailles" (Aux Cailles stream) for 4.2 km (2.6 mi) to the northeast, then the northwest, to Anse aux Cailles on the shore south of the Saguenay River; then the current descends to the east the Saguenay River on 93.1 km (57.8 mi) to Tadoussac where the latter river flows into the St. Lawrence River.

== Toponymy ==
The toponym "Lac Otis" was formalized on December 5, 1968, by the Commission de toponymie du Québec.

== Notes ==
=== Related articles ===
- Le Fjord-du-Saguenay Regional County Municipality
- Saint-Félix-d'Otis, a municipality
- Saguenay River
