= Éternité Lake (Éternité River) =

Lake in Rivière-Éternité, Quebec, Canada

- Grand lac Éternité (French)
- Location in Quebec
- Location: Rivière-Éternité
- Coordinates: 48.22583°N 70.55333°W
- Lake type: Natural
- Primary inflows: Five outlets of lakes such outlet of lac Bailloquet, outlet of lac Long and outlet of "Lac de la Tour".
- Primary outflows: Éternité River
- Basin countries: Canada
- Max. length: 9.0 km (5.6 mi)
- Max. width: 2.6 km (1.6 mi)
- Surface elevation: 250 m (820 ft)

The Éternité Lake is a body of water tributary of the Éternité River and the Saguenay River. It is located in the municipality of Rivière-Éternité, in the Le Fjord-du-Saguenay Regional County Municipality of the administrative region of Saguenay–Lac-Saint-Jean, in the province of Quebec, in Canada. The Éternité Lake straddles the townships of Brébeuf and Hébert. This lake is integrated into the zec du Lac-au-Sable, a controlled exploitation zone.

The northern part of Éternité Lake is served by route 170, that is the main street (east–west direction) which runs south of Otis Lake going west. Few other secondary forest roads serve the lake sector for forestry and recreational tourism activities.

Forestry is the main economic activity in the sector; recreational tourism, second.

The surface of Lake Eternity is usually frozen from the end of November to the beginning of April, however the safe circulation on the ice is generally from mid-December to the end of March.

== Geography ==
The main watersheds adjacent to Eternity Lake are:

- north side: Lac de la Tour, Otis Lake, Lac à la Croix, Saguenay River;
- east side: Saint-Jean River, Éternité River, Saguenay River, Périgny Lake, "Lac à la Truite";
- south side: Saint-Jean River, rivière à la Catin, "Lac des Hauteurs", Malbaie River;
- west side: Bailloquet Lake, Brébeuf Lake, Pierre River, Bras de Ross, Ha! Ha! River.

The Éternité Lake has a length of 9.0 km (5.6 mi) in the shape of a boat anchor, a maximum width of 2.6 km (1.6 mi), an altitude is 250 m (820 ft) and an area of . With a length of around 180 m (590 ft), the "Passe du lac Éternité" is located to the southwest of the lake; it links Lake Eternity and Lake Bailloquet (length: 2.3 km (1.4 mi); altitude: 254 m (833 ft)) which follows the shape of a cross.

The Éternité River has its source at Eternity Lake (navigable length: 9.0 km (5.6 mi); altitude: 250 m (820 ft)). The northeast part of the lake has the shape of a giraffe neck and head looking towards the southeast; the South-West part has the shape of a cross whose top is oriented towards the South-East. The two parts of the lake are connected opposite the outlet of Lake Bailloquet. This lake is surrounded by mountains.

The mouth of Éternité Lake is located at:

- 5.2 km (3.2 mi) south-west of the village center of Rivière-Éternité;
- 7.5 km (4.7 mi) north-east of Brébeuf Lake;
- 13.5 km (8.4 mi) south-east of a bay on the Saguenay River;
- 14.6 km (9.1 mi) south-west of the confluence of the Éternité River (Baie Éternité) and the Saguenay River;
- 31.9 km (19.8 mi) north-east of the mouth of Lake Ha! Ha!;
- 56.1 km (34.9 mi) east of downtown Saguenay (city);
- 49.4 km (30.7 mi) west of downtown Tadoussac.

From the mouth of Éternity Lake, the current descends the Éternité River on 19.8 km (12.3 mi) northeast to the Éternity Bay which the current crosses 3.0 km (1.9 mi) north to the entrance of the bay; then the current descends to the east the Saguenay River on 65.4 km (40.6 mi) to Tadoussac where the latter river flows into the St. Lawrence River.

== Toponymy ==
The explorer Joseph Bureau, in his 1904 report on the township of Hébert, designated this body of water "le grand lac Éternité".

The toponym "Lac Éternité" was formalized on December 5, 1968, by the Commission de toponymie du Québec.

== See also ==
- Le Fjord-du-Saguenay Regional County Municipality
- Zec du Lac-au-Sable, a controlled exploitation zone (zec)
- Rivière-Éternité, a municipality
- Éternité River
- Saguenay River
