= Zec du Lac-Brébeuf =

- Location within Quebec
- Location: Canada, Quebec, Le Fjord-du-Saguenay Regional County Municipality
- Nearest city: Saguenay city
- Coordinates: 48°06′N 70°33′W
- Area: 434 square kilometres (168 sq mi)
- Established: 1978
- Administrator: Association Chasse et Pêche Lac-Brébeuf inc.

The ZEC du Lac-Brébeuf is a "zone d'exploitation contrôlée" (controlled harvesting zone) (ZEC) of 434 square kilometres (168 sq mi), located partly in the unorganized territory Lalemant, in the MRC Le Fjord-du-Saguenay Regional County Municipality and also in the MRC Charlevoix-Est Regional County Municipality, in the administrative region of Saguenay-Lac-Saint-Jean, in Quebec, in Canada.

The main economic activities of the protected area are forestry and recreo-tourism activities such fishing and hunting.

== Geography ==
Of the 152 lakes in this zone d'exploitation controlée (controlled harvesting zone) the most important in term of area are lakes Brébeuf, Eternity and Desprez. Along 12 kilometres (7.5 mi) Brébeuf lake is located mainly in the canton de Brébeuf and extends partially into the territory of the municipality of Rivière-Éternité (River Eternity). This lake has several bays, and the greatest is "baie de la Sauvagesse" (Savage bay), located at the northwest end. This is the head of the lake Saint-Jean River (Saguenay River tributary), which drains into the Saguenay River to L'Anse-Saint-Jean.

Three watersheds are draining the territory of the ZEC, the rivers Saint-Jean River (Saguenay River tributary) and its tributaries, Cami and Harlot. The main entrance station of the zec is that of Saint-Félix-d'Otis, the route 170. The docking station is 3 kilometers from the church of Saint-Félix-d'Otis, following the route du Lac-Brébeuf. Zec operates three rustic campgrounds with a total of 54 locations. Some locations are reserved for seasonal rentals, while others are for short stays.

== Hunting and Fishing ==
In this Zec, fishing enthusiasts take mostly brook (char or fountain), the lake trout and the eel. Furthermore, hunting is popular for small animal (hare, grouse), the american black bear and the mousel. Hunters are required to comply with the quotas allocated by species.

== Toponymy ==
The name "Zec du Lac-Brébeuf" is associated with the toponyms of the same name designating the lake and township. The name "Lake Brébeuf" was awarded in 1943, the year of the commemoration of the 350th anniversary of the birth of the Jesuit Jean de Brébeuf (1593-1649), one of the Canadian Martyrs. Previously, the lake was designated "Little Lake St. John", the Commission de toponymie du Québec (Geographical Names Board of Quebec) which refers to a 1925 publication. The name of the lake was written in various forms according to use, such "Little Lake St. John", "Little Lake St. John" and "Little Lake St-Jean".

The name "Lake Zec-Brébeuf" was recorded on August 5, 1982 at the Bank of place names in the Commission de toponymie du Québec (Geographical Names Board of Quebec).

== See also ==
=== Related articles ===
- Lalemant, unorganized territory
- L'Anse-Saint-Jean, municipality
- Saguenay River
- Saint-Jean River (Saguenay River tributary)
- Saguenay-Lac-Saint-Jean, administrative region of Quebec
- Parc national du Fjord-du-Saguenay
- Zone d'exploitation contrôlée (Controlled harvesting zone) (ZEC)

== Attachments ==
=== External links ===
- Official website of ZEC du Lac-Brébeuf.
- "Town of L'Anse-Saint-Jean". Archived from the original on 2014-07-14.
