= Brébeuf Lake =

Body of water tributary of the Saint-Jean River

- Location in Quebec
- Location: Rivière-Éternité
- Coordinates: 48.18528°N 70.59805°W
- Lake type: Natural
- Primary inflows: Pierre River, bras de Ross, ruisseau des Papinachois, outlet of Lac Rond.
- Primary outflows: Saint-Jean River (Saguenay River tributary)
- Basin countries: Canada
- Max. length: 12.5 km (7.8 mi)
- Max. width: 1.4 km (0.87 mi)
- Surface elevation: 226 m (741 ft)

The Brébeuf Lake is a body of water tributary of the Saint-Jean River. It is in the municipality of Rivière-Éternité, Quebec, Canada.

The Brébeuf Lake is integrated into the zec du Lac-au-Sable, a controlled exploitation zone.

The southwest part of Brébeuf Lake is served by a forest road from the village of Saint-Félix-d'Otis where it connects to route 170. Few other secondary forest roads serve the lake sector for forestry and recreational tourism activities.

Forestry is the main economic activity in the sector; recreational tourism, second.

The surface of Brébeuf Lake is usually frozen from the end of November to the beginning of April, however safe circulation on the ice is generally made from mid-December to the end of March.

== Geography ==
The main watersheds near Brébeuf Lake are:

- north side: Bailoquet Lake, Éternity Lake, Otis Lake, Lac à la Croix, Saguenay River;
- east side: Périgny Lake, Saint-Jean river, Petit Saguenay River, Saguenay River;
- south side: rivière à la Catin, Cami River, Lac des Canots, Pierre River, Vipère lake, Cinto lake, rivière à Mars North-West;
- west side: Pierre River, Bras de Ross, Ha! Ha! River.

The Brébeuf Lake has a length of 12.5 km (7.8 mi) segmented into three parts, a maximum width of 1.4 km (0.87 mi), an altitude is 226 m (741 ft) and a area of . The current from Pierre River crosses Brébeuf Lake for 2.9 km (1.8 mi) to the east. This lake includes a peninsula attached to the south shore forming a strait of a hundred meters along the north shore of the lake; this peninsula forms on the east side of "Anse à Taschereau". Brébeuf Lake is mainly fed by the Pierre River, Bras de Ross, the Papinachois stream and the outlet of Rond Lake. The main bays around the lake are: "Anse à Bacalem", "Anse à la Balle" and "Anse à Taschereau". The Mont du Lac Bruno (altitude: 334 m (1,096 ft)) is located at 0.2 km (0.12 mi) on the southwest shore. While the northeast shore has several peaks exceeding 450 meters.

The mouth of the lake is in a small bay on the east side of the lake, either:

- 4.7 km (2.9 mi) south of Éternity Lake;
- 14.2 km (8.8 mi) south-east of the village center of Saint-Félix-d'Otis;
- 21.0 km (13.0 mi) south-east of a bay on the Saguenay River;
- 23.8 km (14.8 mi) north-east of Lake Ha! Ha!;
- 27.4 km (17.0 mi) south-east of the confluence of the Saint-Jean River and the Saguenay River;
- 47.7 km (29.6 mi) south-east of downtown Saguenay;
- 61.3 km (38.1 mi) south-west of Tadoussac town center.

From the mouth of Brébeuf Lake, the current descends the Saint-Jean River on 38.9 km (24.2 mi) towards the northeast, then descends towards east the Saguenay River on 45.7 km (28.4 mi) to Tadoussac where this last river flows into the St. Lawrence River.

== Toponymy ==
Born in Condé-sur-Vire, in France, the Jesuit father Jean de Brébeuf (1593-1649) came to New France, in 1625. He was a missionary at the Innu, near Quebec City, then in Huronia where he founded a mission. He was there with Father Gabriel Lalemant when, on March 16, the Iroquois carried out a deadly attack on the Wendat (Huron) establishments. Fathers Brébeuf and Lalemant are then brought back to mission St. Ignace Mission (region of Midland (Ontario)) where they die after being tortured. Pope Pius XI canonized him on June 20, 1930, along with six other Jesuits who were victims of the same fate, between 1642 and 1649.

The toponym "Lac Brébeuf" was formalized on December 5, 1968, by the Commission de toponymie du Québec.

== See also ==
- Le Fjord-du-Saguenay Regional County Municipality
- Ferland-et-Boilleau, a municipality
- Rivière-Éternité, a municipality
- Zec du Lac-au-Sable, a controlled exploitation zone (zec)
- Saint-Jean River
- Saguenay River
