= Denys Tremblay =

Canadian artist (1951–2026)

Denys Tremblay (1950 or 1951 – October 2, 2026) was a Canadian artist and micronational leader. He was king of L'Anse-Saint-Jean from 1997 to 2000. Tremblay died on 2 October 2026 aged 75 after a struggle with cancer.
