= Saint-Jean Bay (Saguenay River) =

Cove in L'Anse-Saint-Jean, Quebec, Canada

Coordinates: 48°15′05″N 70°11′26″W

Anse Saint-Jean
- Location within Quebec
- Location: Saguenay River, Quebec, Canada
- Type: Bay

L'Anse Saint-Jean (English: Saint-Jean Bay) is a bay located on the south shore of the Saguenay River at L'Anse-Saint-Jean, in the Le Fjord-du-Saguenay Regional County Municipality, in Quebec, Canada.

== Geography ==
Perpendicular to the Saguenay River, this cove is 2.3 km (1.4 mi) wide by 2.8 km (1.7 mi) long. The Saint-Jean River flows into the end of the bay.

The entrance to this bay is bounded by "Pointe au Boeuf" (located to the west) and "la Grande Pointe" (located to the east).

== History ==
Located between Anse du Petit Saguenay (east side) and Baie Éternité (west side), Anse Saint-Jean is a haven for pleasure boating in the event of large waves.

== Gallery ==
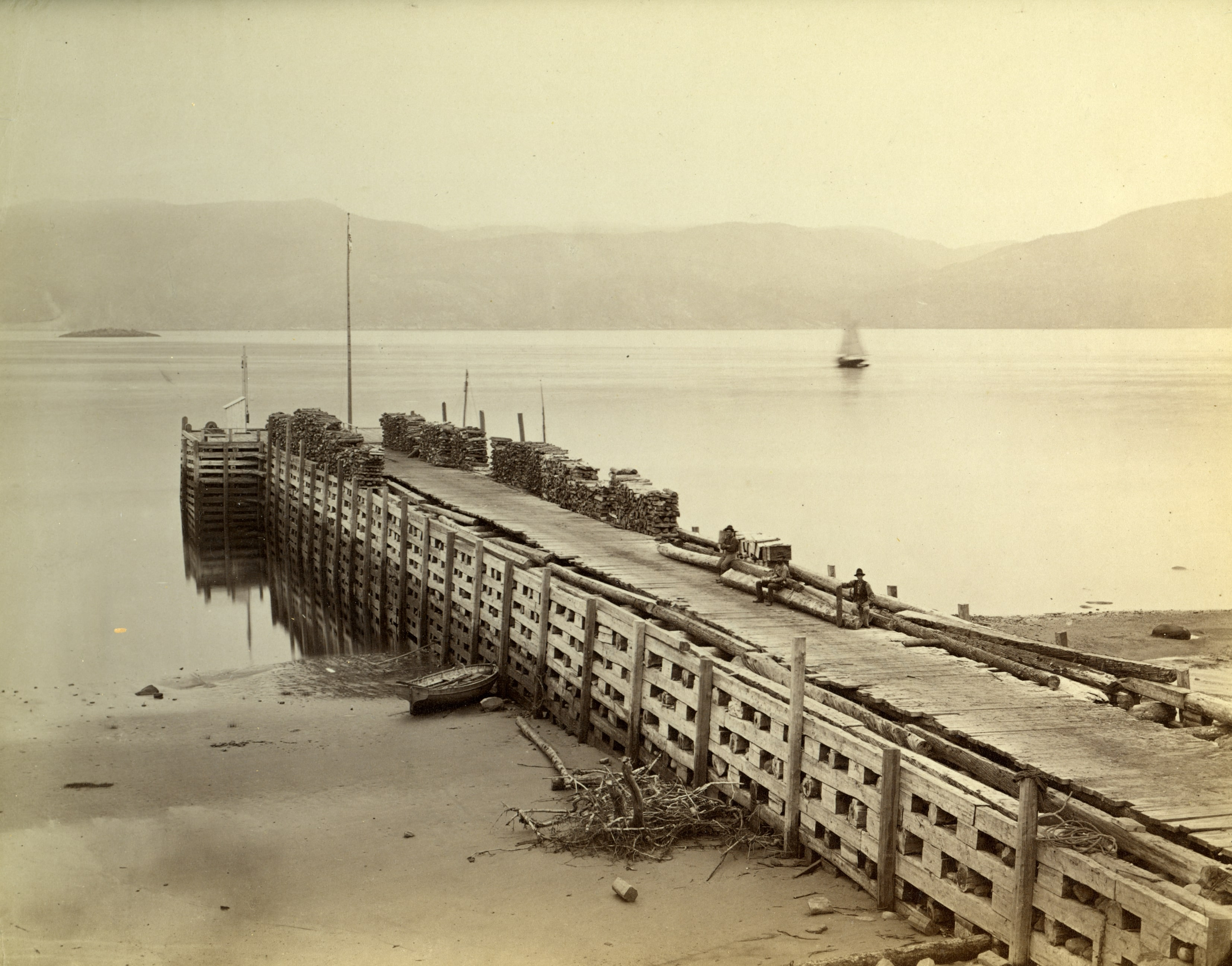

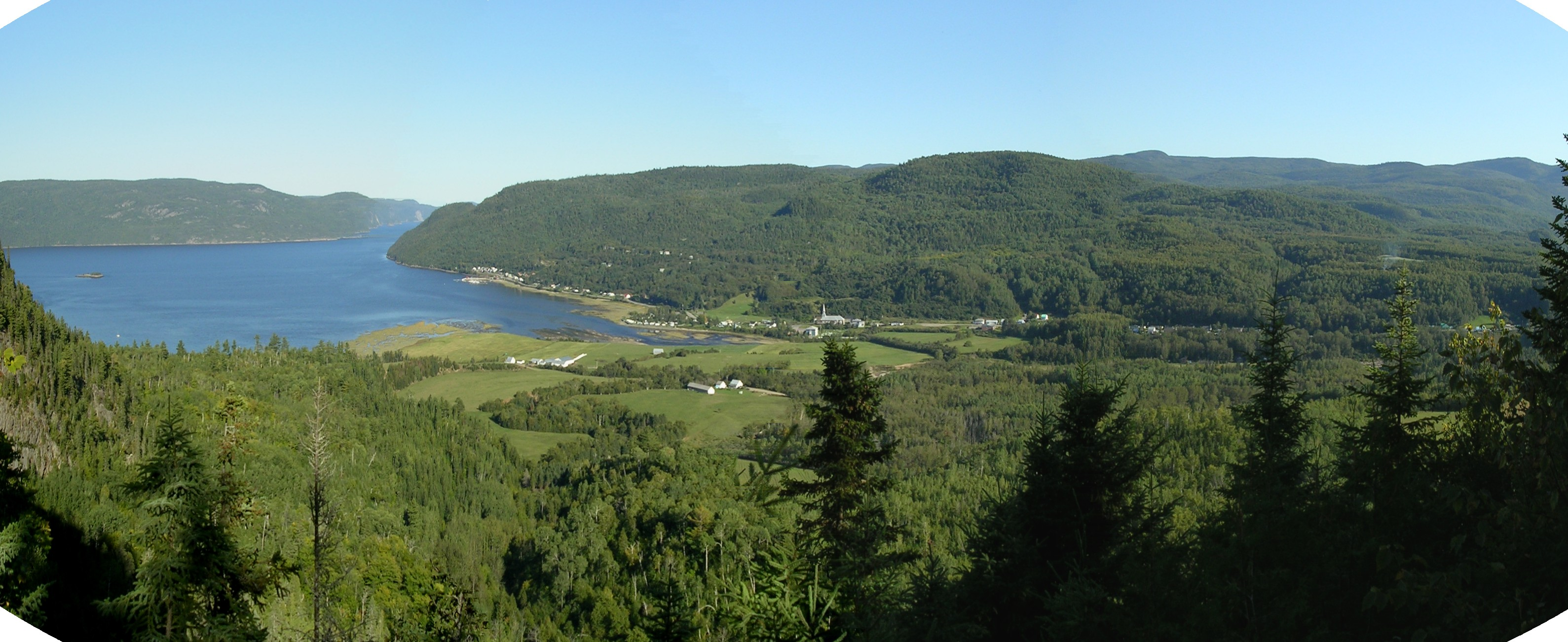

== See also ==
- Zec de la Rivière-Saint-Jean-du-Saguenay, a controlled harvesting zone
