= Saint-Jean River (Saguenay River tributary) =

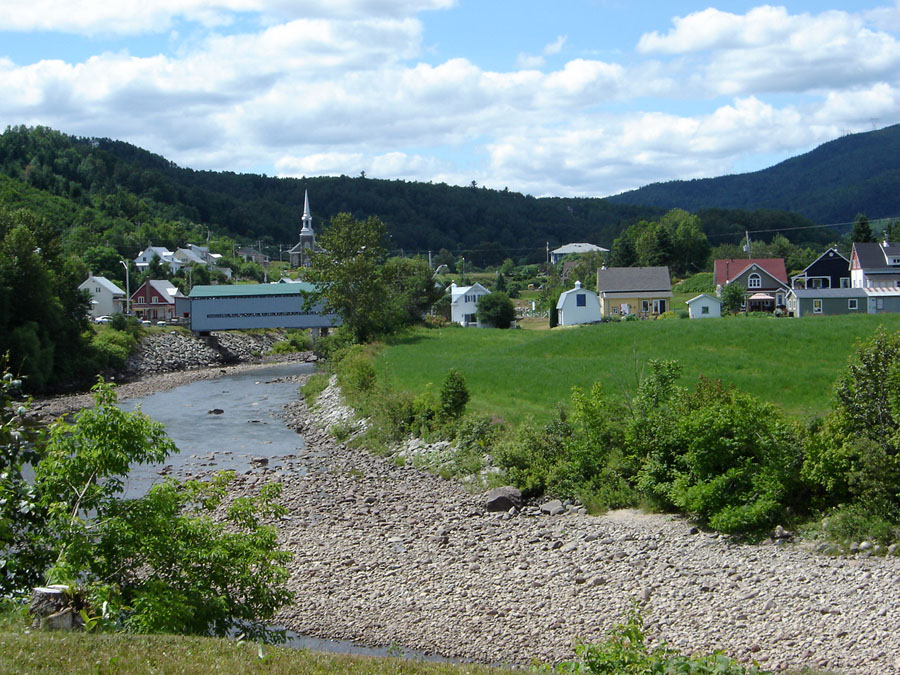

- Location within Quebec

Location
- Country: Canada
- Province: Quebec
- Region: Capitale-Nationale and Saguenay-Lac-Saint-Jean
- Regional County Municipality: Le Fjord-du-Saguenay Regional County Municipality
- Municipalities: L'Anse-Saint-Jean

Physical characteristics
- Source: Brébeuf Lake
  - location: Rivière-Éternité
  - coordinates: 48.18528°N 70.59805°W
  - elevation: 226 m (741 ft)
- Mouth: Saguenay River
  - location: L'Anse-Saint-Jean
  - coordinates: 48.24139°N 70.19805°W
  - elevation: 3 m (9.8 ft)
- Length: 38.8 km (24.1 mi)
- Discharge
  - location: L'Anse-Saint-Jean

Basin features
- Tributaries
  - left: (from the mouth) Ruisseau Girard, ruisseau à Denis, outlet of two lakes, outlet of lac Étienne.
  - right: (from the mouth) Ruisseau Patrice-Fortin, Bras à Pierre, outlet of few lakes, Cami River.

The Saint-Jean River (St. John River) is a river crossing the municipalities of Rivière-Éternité and L'Anse-Saint-Jean in the Le Fjord-du-Saguenay Regional County Municipality, in the administrative region of Saguenay-Lac-Saint-Jean, Quebec, Canada.

The upper portion of the Saint John River is integrated into Zec du Lac-Brébeuf, a controlled harvesting zone (ZEC).

The Saint-Jean River is served primarily by route 170 (east-west), which passes through the hamlets "Le Ruisseau-du-Portage" and "La Chute-à-Salum". Some other secondary forest roads serve the lake area mainly for forestry and recreational tourism purposes.

Forestry is the main economic activity of the sector; recreational tourism activities, second.

The surface of the Saint John River is usually frozen from late November to early April (except in rapids areas), however, safe ice movement is generally from mid-December to late March.

== Geography ==
Three watersheds drain the territory of Zec du Lac-Brebeuf, which are the Saint-Jean rivers and its tributaries, Cami and Catin.

The Saint John River rises at the mouth of Brébeuf Lake. This lake has a length of 12.5 km (7.8 mi) divided into three parts, a maximum width of 1.4 km (0.87 mi), an altitude of 226 m (741 ft) and an area of .

The mouth of the lake is located in a small bay on the east side of the lake, at:

- 4.7 km (2.9 mi) south of Éternity Lake;
- 14.2 km (8.8 mi) south-east of the village center of Saint-Félix-d'Otis;
- 21.0 km (13.0 mi) southeast of a bay of the Saguenay River;
- 23.8 km (14.8 mi) northeast of Lake Ha! Ha!;
- 27.4 km (17.0 mi) southeast of the confluence of the Saint John River and the Saguenay River;
- 47.7 km (29.6 mi) south-east of downtown Saguenay (city);
- 61.3 km (38.1 mi) south-west of downtown Tadoussac.

The course of the Saint John River flows over 38.8 km (24.1 mi) generally to the northeast, according to the following segments:

- 1.1 km (0.68 mi) northeasterly in a marsh zone to the confluence (coming from the south) of the rivière à la Catin;
- 11.7 km (7.3 mi) north-east crossing series of rapids and forming a hook to the north, until bras à Pierre (coming from the south);
- 4.7 km (2.9 mi) north-east to the outlet (coming from the west) of Emmuraillé Lake, near the hamlet "La Vallée-d'Amont";
- 8.2 km (5.1 mi) northeasterly to the stream at Denis;
- 1.0 km (0.62 mi) north to Girard Brook (coming from the west);
- 3.6 km (2.2 mi) easterly forming a W at the end of the segment, to the brook of Portage (coming from the south), located in the village of "Le Ruisseau-du-Portage";
- 8.5 km (5.3 mi) northerly forming a northwesterly loop to the village of "Ruisseau-à-Venant", crossing several sets of rapids and forming three loops to the west, then forming a last great loop eastward to the village of L'Anse-Saint-Jean, to its mouth.

The mouth of the Saint John River flows to the bottom of Anse Saint-Jean in the village of L'Anse-Saint-Jean on the south shore of the Saguenay River . This mouth is located at:

- 4.4 km (2.7 mi) east of the summit (altitude: 570 m (1,870 ft)) of the Orange Mountain;
- 5.4 km (3.4 mi) south of the north shore of the Saguenay River (at the level of Portage Cove);
- 6.1 km (3.8 mi) north of the village center of "Le Ruisseau-du-Portage";
- 38 km (24 mi) west of Tadoussac;
- 67.8 km (42.1 mi) east of Saguenay (city).

From the mouth of the Saint John River, the current flows through Anse Saint-Jean to 2.9 km (1.8 mi) northerly, then down the Saguenay River on 42.8 km (26.6 mi) to the east where flows into the St. Lawrence River at Tadoussac.

== Toponymy ==
The toponym "Rivière Saint-Jean" appears as early as 1731 in Louis Aubert's Journal de Lachesnaye (transcript of Serge Goudreau). His writing appears in the form of "Riviere de l'anse S[ain]t Jean" and "Riviere S[ain]t Jean": "I entered the river of the ance S[ain]t Jean ["St jean" in the manuscript] in the favor of the high pond /.../ When entering the river S[ain]t Jean ["St jean" in the manuscript], I made /.../" [25 August 1731]. The toponym "Rivière St-Jean" appears in the 1893 report of land surveyor William Tremblay.

The toponym "Saint-Jean River" (Saguenay) was formalized on December 5, 1968, at the Place Names Bank of the Commission de toponymie du Québec.

== Annexes ==
=== Related Articles ===
- Le Fjord-du-Saguenay Regional County Municipality
- Rivière-Éternité, a municipality
- L'Anse-Saint-Jean, a municipality
- Zec du Lac-Brébeuf, a controlled harvesting zone (zec)
- Brébeuf Lake
- Cami River, a watercourse
- Rivière à la Catin, a watercourse
- Bras à Pierre, a watercourse
- Saint-Jean Bay, a bay
- List of rivers of Quebec
