= Lalemant, Quebec =

Lalemant
- Unorganized territory

- Location in Saguenay–Lac-Saint-Jean Quebec.
- Coordinates: 48°03′N 70°38′W
- Country: Canada
- Province: Quebec
- Region: Saguenay–Lac-Saint-Jean
- RCM: Le Fjord-du-Saguenay
- Constituted: February 18, 2002

Government
  - Federal riding: Chicoutimi—Le Fjord
  - Prov. riding: Dubuc

Area
  - Total: 202.90 km^{2} (78.34 sq mi)
  - Land: 190.52 km^{2} (73.56 sq mi)

Population (2011)
  - Total: 0
  - Density: 0/km^{2} (0/sq mi)
  - Pop (2006–11): N/A
  - Dwellings: 0
- Time zone: UTC−05:00 (EST)
  - Summer (DST): UTC−04:00 (EDT)

Lalemant (French pronunciation: [lalmɑ̃]) is an unorganized territory in the Canadian province of Quebec, located in the regional county municipality of Le Fjord-du-Saguenay. The region had a population of 0 in the Canada 2011 Census, and covered a land area of 190.52 km^{2}.

The territory corresponds to and is named after the geographic township of Lalemant. The township was proclaimed in 1920 and named in honour of Jesuit Gabriel Lalemant (1610 - 1649).
