= Éternité Bay =

Bay in Quebec, Canada

- Baie Éternité (French)
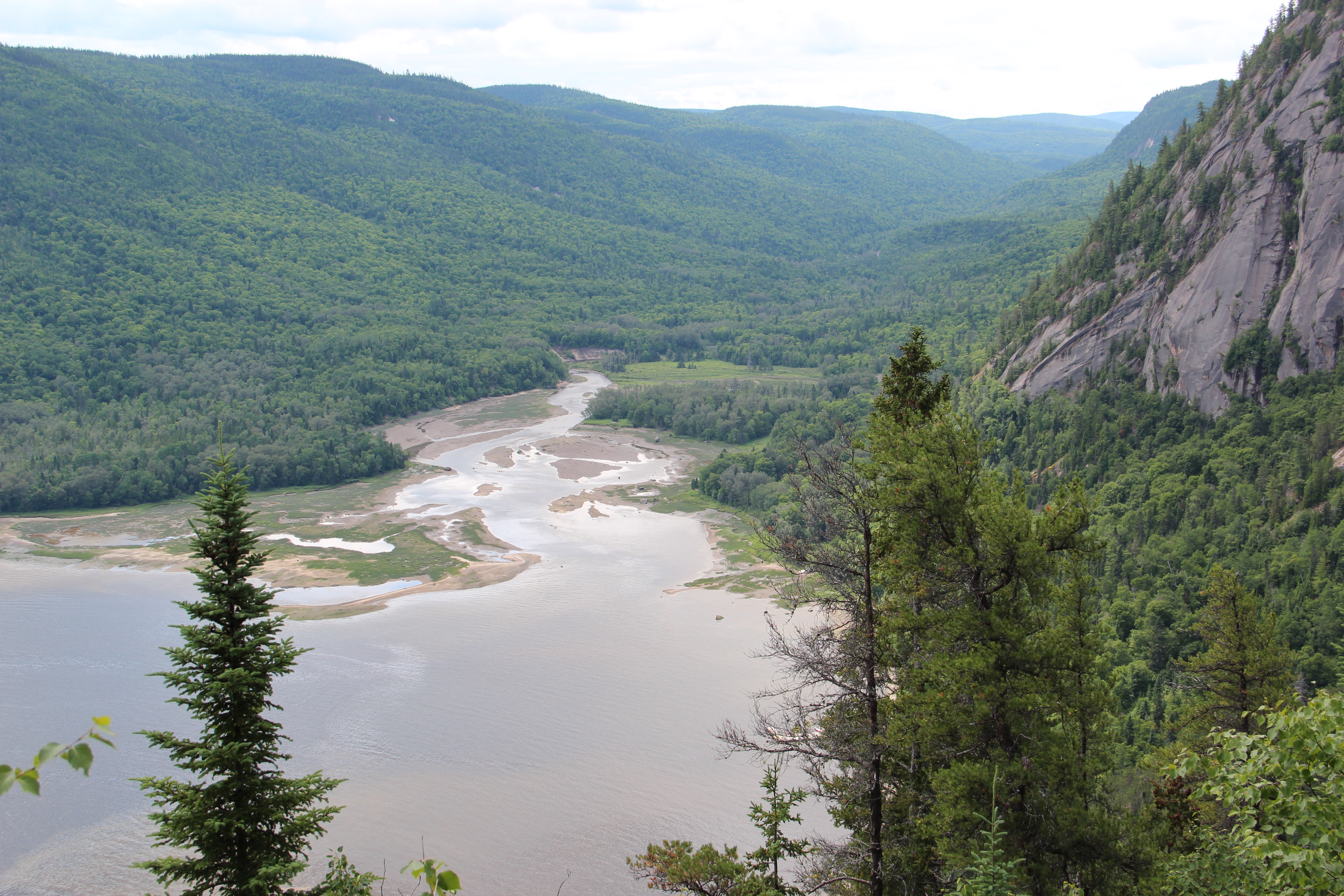

- Location within Quebec

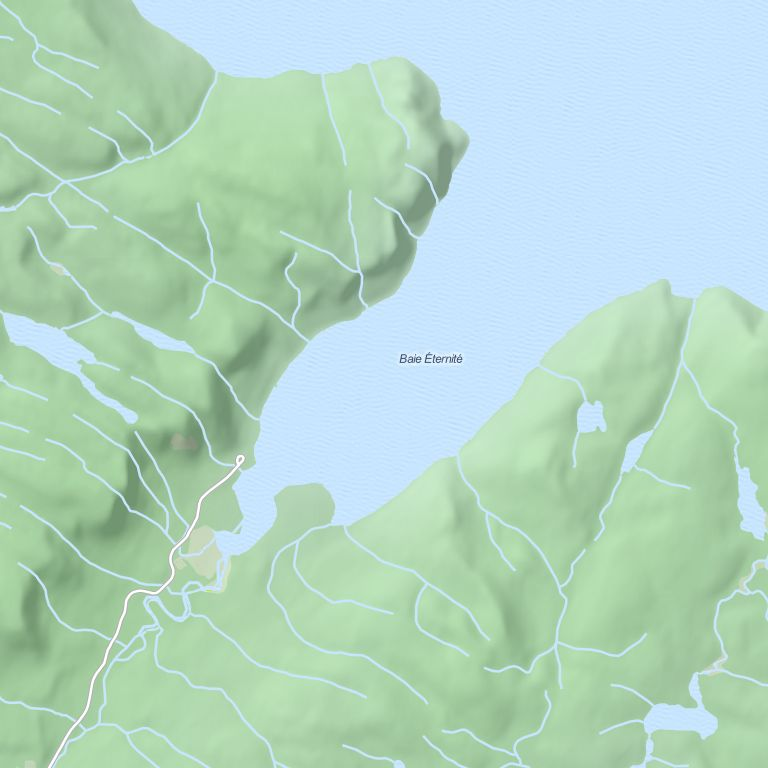
- Location: Rivière-Éternité, Quebec, Canada
- Coordinates: 48°18′23″N 70°19′13″W
- Part of: Saguenay River
- Primary inflows: Éternité River
- Managing agency: Sépaq
- Max. length: 1 km (0.62 mi)
- Max. width: 2.5 km (1.6 mi)

Éternité Bay (French: Baie Éternité, meaning Eternity Bay) is a bay located south of the Saguenay Fjord at Rivière-Éternité, Quebec, Canada. It is part of Saguenay Fjord National Park.

== Geography ==
Perpendicular to Saguenay River, it is 1.0 km (0.62 mi) wide by 2.5 km (1.6 mi) long. The Éternité River drains into it at the head of the bay.

In front of Éternité Bay, the Saguenay fjord reaches its maximum depth there of 472 m (1,549 ft).

Two capes are at the mouth of the bay along the Saguenay: Cap Trinité (411 m (1,348 ft)) to the northwest, Cap Éternité (454 m (1,490 ft)) at the South-East.

== History ==
On Cap Trinité is the statue of Notre-Dame-du-Saguenay.

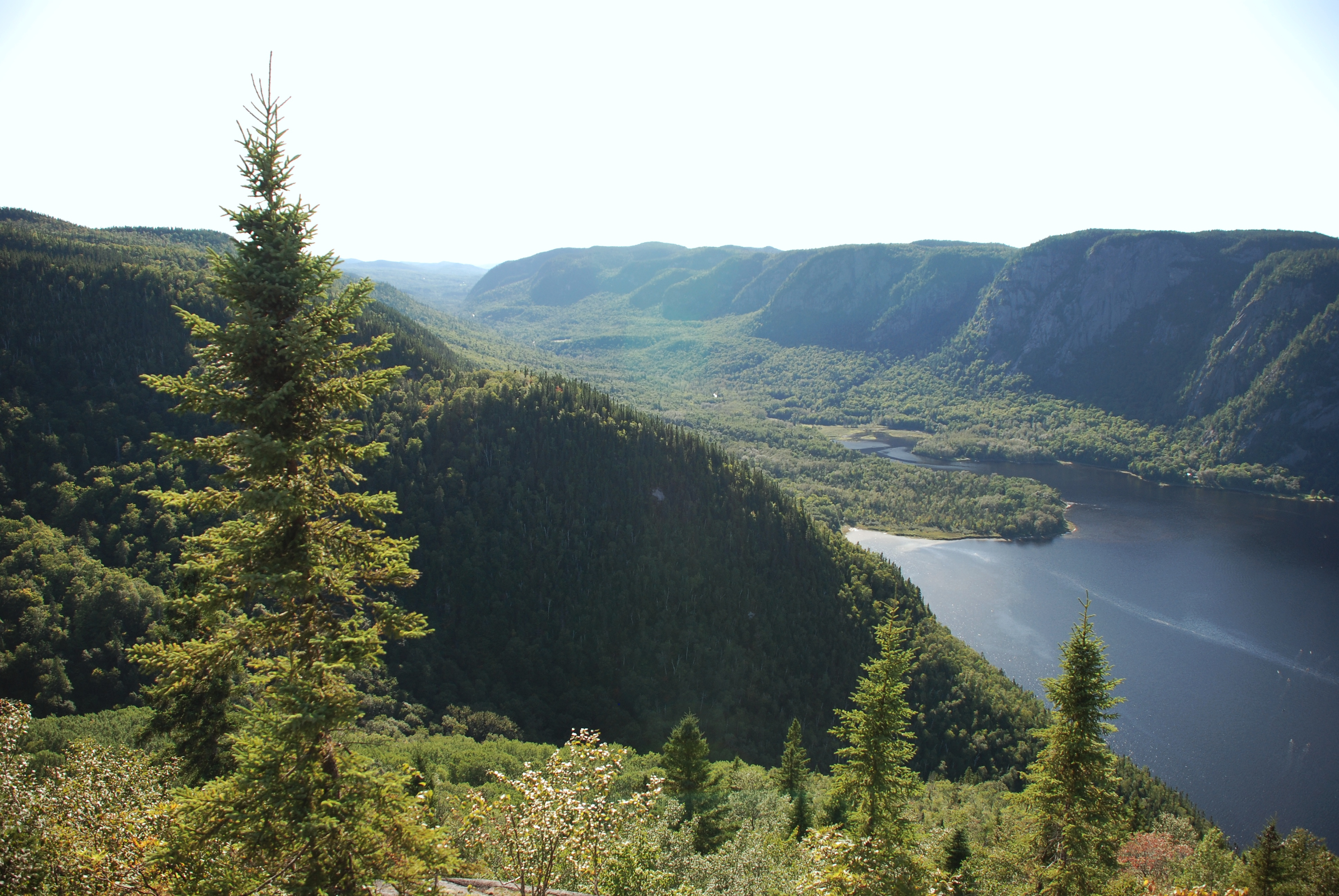
Baie Éternité seen from Cap Éternité

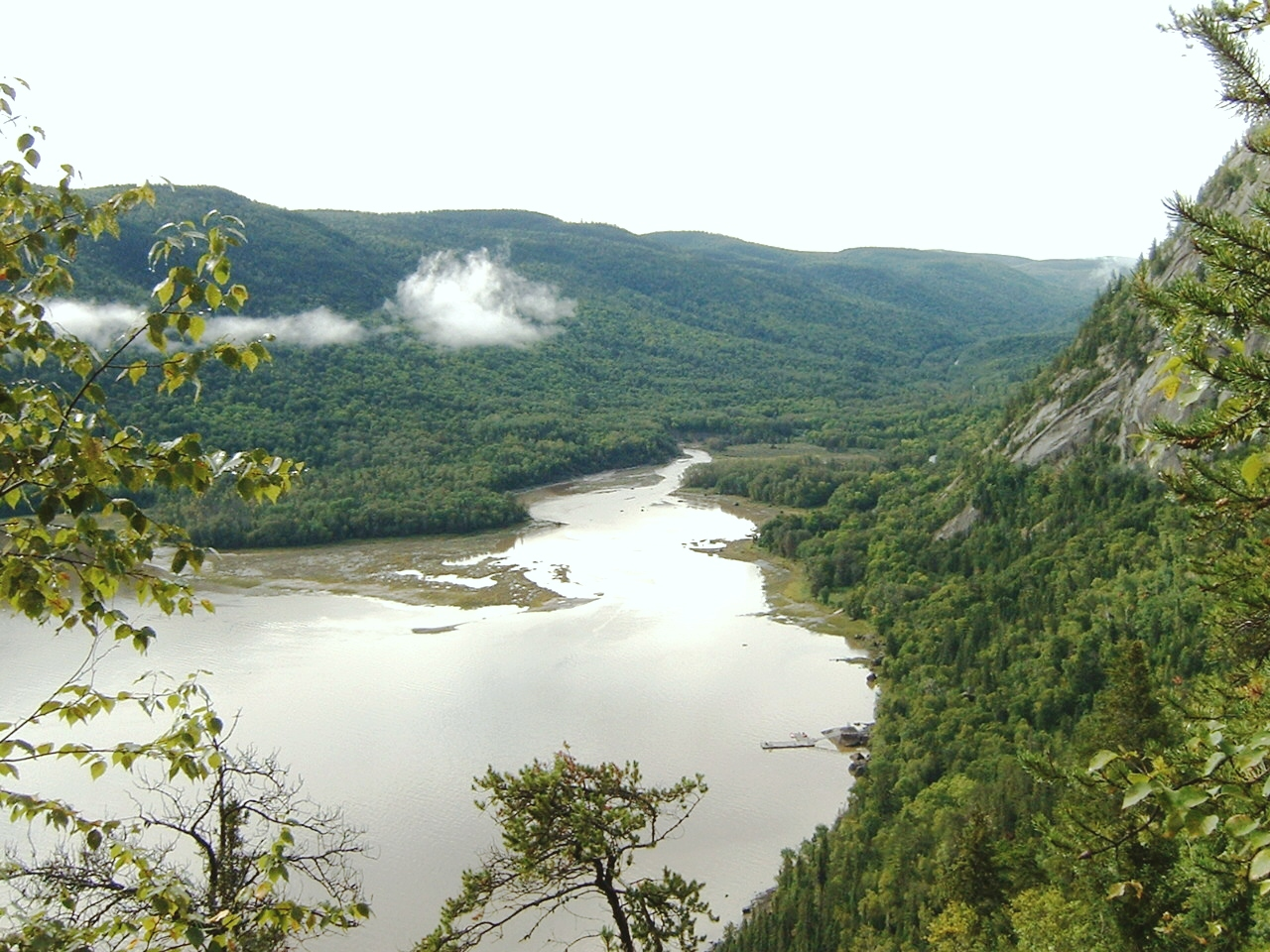
Mouth of the Éternité River
