= Saint-Félix-d'Otis =

- Municipality
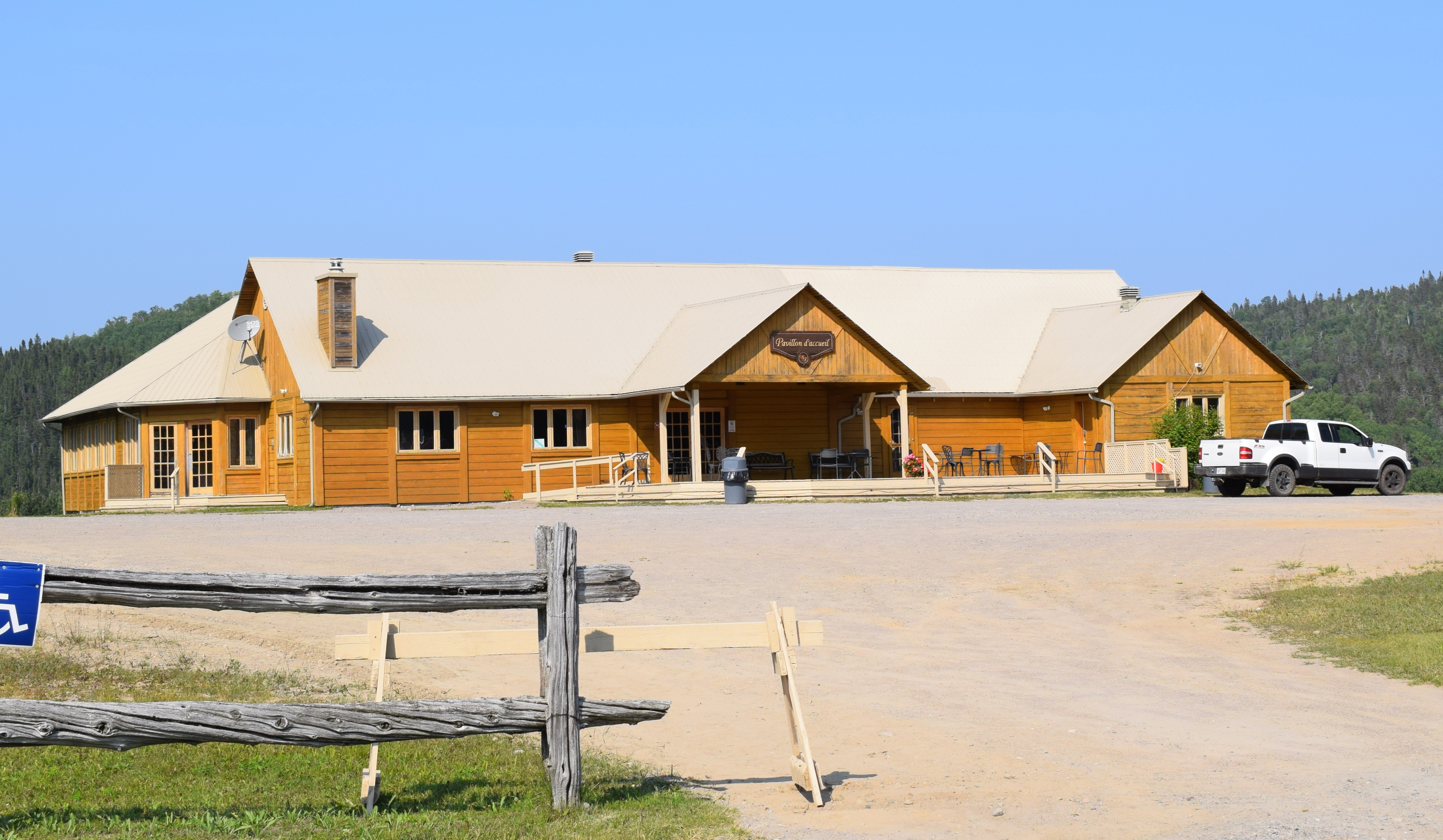
- Site de la Nouvelle-France

- Location in Saguenay–Lac-Saint-Jean Quebec
- Coordinates: 48°16′N 70°37′W
- Country: Canada
- Province: Quebec
- Region: Saguenay–Lac-Saint-Jean
- RCM: Le Fjord-du-Saguenay
- Constituted: October 3, 1923

Government
  - Mayor: Pierre Deslauriers
  - Federal riding: Chicoutimi—Le Fjord
  - Prov. riding: Dubuc

Area
  - Total: 278.10 km^{2} (107.38 sq mi)
  - Land: 233.16 km^{2} (90.02 sq mi)

Population (2021)
  - Total: 1,109
  - Density: 4.8/km^{2} (12/sq mi)
  - Pop (2016–21): ▲16%
  - Dwellings: 819
- Time zone: UTC−5 (EST)
  - Summer (DST): UTC−4 (EDT)
- Postal code(s): G0V 1M0
- Area codes: 418 and 581
- Website: www.st-felix-dotis.qc.ca

Saint-Félix-d'Otis (French pronunciation: [sɛ̃ feliks dɔtis]) is a municipality in Quebec, Canada.
