= Éternité River =

River in Quebec, Canada, a tributary of the Saguenay

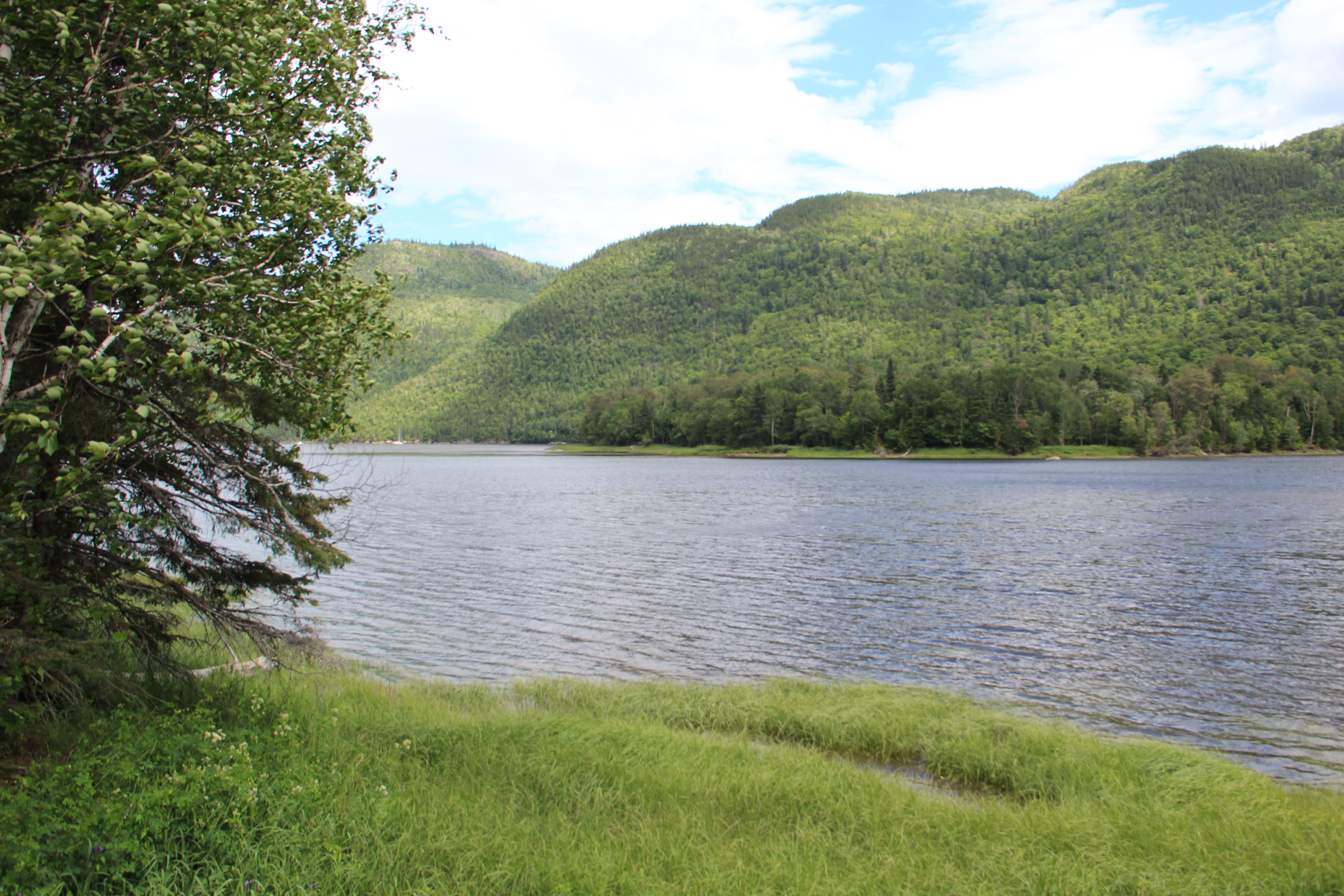

- Location within Quebec
- Native name: Rivère Éternité (French)

Location
- Country: Canada
- Province: Quebec
- Region: Saguenay-Lac-Saint-Jean
- Regional County Municipality: Le Fjord-du-Saguenay Regional County Municipality
- Municipalities: Rivière-Éternité

Physical characteristics
- Source: Éternité Lake
  - location: Rivière-Éternité
  - coordinates: 48.22583°N 70.55333°W
  - elevation: 250 m (820 ft)
- Mouth: Éternité Bay
  - location: Rivière-Éternité
  - coordinates: 48.29917°N 70.33444°W
  - elevation: 3 m (9.8 ft)
- Length: 19.8 km (12.3 mi)

Basin features
- Tributaries
  - left: (from the mouth) Outlet of eight lakes such Price and Riverin, ruisseau Bouchard, ruisseau Benouche, outlet of "Lac à Adolphe", outlet of lakes "du Trait Carré", "de la Tour" and "lac Long", outlet (via "Lac Éternité") of lakes Provisions, en Haut and Cazot, outlet of lac Bailloquet (via Lac Éternité).
  - right: (from the mouth) Outlet of six lakes such Périgny and "des Sables".

The Éternité River (French: Rivière Éternité, meaning Eternity River) is a small stream in Quebec, Canada, which flows into Eternity Bay at Rivière-Éternité, in the Le Fjord-du-Saguenay Regional County Municipality, in the administrative region of Saguenay–Lac-Saint-Jean.

The upper part of this river crosses the zec du Lac-au-Sable, a controlled exploitation zone; the lower part crosses the Saguenay Fjord National Park, a protected natural area which is very popular with tourists.

The Éternité river is mainly served by the route 170 (east-west direction) which passes through the village of Rivière-Éternité. Some other secondary forest roads serve the lake sector for forestry and recreational tourism activities.

Forestry is the main economic activity in the sector; recreational tourism, second.

The surface of the Eternity River is usually frozen from the end of November to the beginning of April, however the safe circulation on the ice is generally done from mid-December to the end of March.

== Geography ==
The Eternity River rises at Éternity Lake (navigable length: 9.0 km (5.6 mi); altitude: 250 m (820 ft)) which straddles the townships "de Brébeuf" and "de Hébert". The northeast part of the lake has the shape of a giraffe neck and head looking towards the southeast; the South-West part has the shape of a cross whose top is oriented towards the South-East. The two parts of the lake are connected opposite the outlet of Lake Bailloquet. This lake is surrounded by mountains. The mouth of Éternité Lake is located at:

- 14.3 km (8.9 mi) West of the confluence of the Eternity river;
- 11.6 km (7.2 mi) South of the Saguenay River;
- 27.9 km (17.3 mi) South-East of downtown La Baie.

The course of the Eternity River generally flows northeast on 19.8 km (12.3 mi) according to the following segments:

- 2.0 km (1.2 mi) east to the outlet (coming from the east) of Lake Périgny;
- 1.9 km (1.2 mi) towards the north-east notably by crossing on 0.7 km (0.43 mi) the Little Eternity Lake (altitude: 241 m (791 ft)) to the outlet (from the east) of Hamel Lake, Huard Lake and Trout Lake;
- 5.9 km (3.7 mi) north-east to Benouche stream, located in the village of Rivière-Éternité;
- 10.0 km (6.2 mi) towards the northeast by collecting the outlet (coming from the west) of Price Lake and of Riverine Lake; as well as the outlet (coming from the west) from Lac Côté, to the bottom of the Baie Éternité (length: 3.0 km (1.9 mi)).

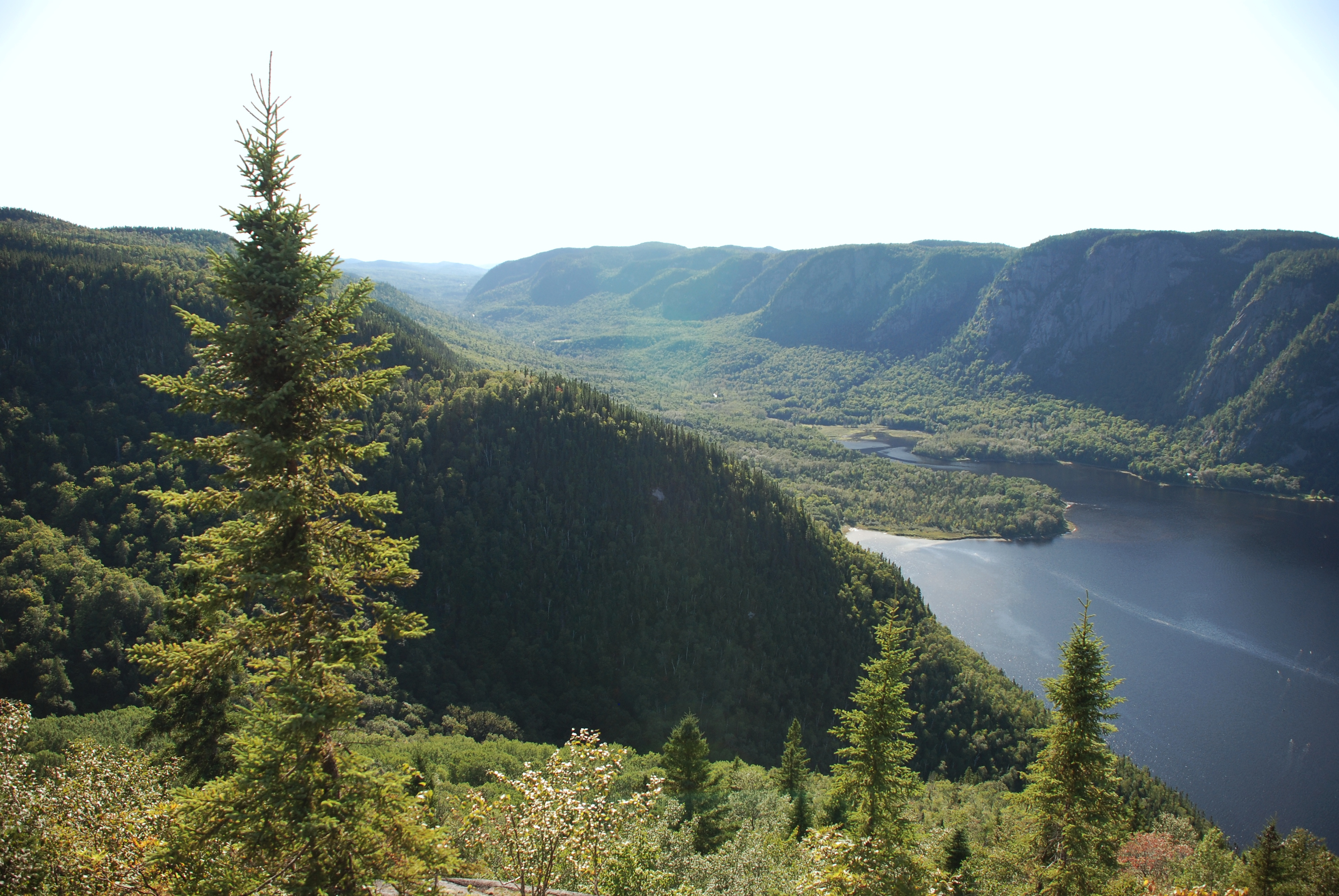
Baie Éternité seen from Cap Éternité with Éternité River on the right

The mouth of the Eternity River is located at:

- 5.0 km (3.1 mi) south of a cape on the north shore of the Saguenay River;
- 49.0 km (30.4 mi) west of Tadoussac;
- 7.2 km (4.5 mi) north-east of the center of the village of Rivière-Éternité;
- 56.4 km (35.0 mi) east of Saguenay (city).

From the mouth of the Éternité river, the current crosses the Baie Éternité on 3.0 km (1.9 mi) north, then descends the Saguenay River on 65.4 km (40.6 mi) to the east where flows into the St. Lawrence River at Tadoussac.

== Toponymy ==
The Commission de toponymie du Québec wrote about it: "a map of Jacques-Nicolas Bellin, from 1744, designates the river by the Amerindian name Heregachitgs, which translates as the Trinity. Captain Louis Sivrac mentions the toponym Ance d'Éternité, in 1824. A map produced in 1825 by Pascal Taché identified the river which ends at the bottom of the bay: "Rve de l'Étrinité" (sic)."

It continues: "The Éternité river is a small fish-filled stream that descends from the Laurentian mountains for almost 20 km, to discharge Lac Éternité, a narrow body of water, which forms an L stretched over 9 km long. Forest sites were exploited along this river, in the current municipality of Rivière-Éternité, at the end of the XIXe century."

== Fish ==
According to the Sépaq, the Eternity river is an important river for the reproduction of the brook trout anadrome, commonly called sea trout.

== See also ==
- St. Lawrence River, a stream
- List of rivers of Quebec
