= Rivière-Éternité =

- Municipality
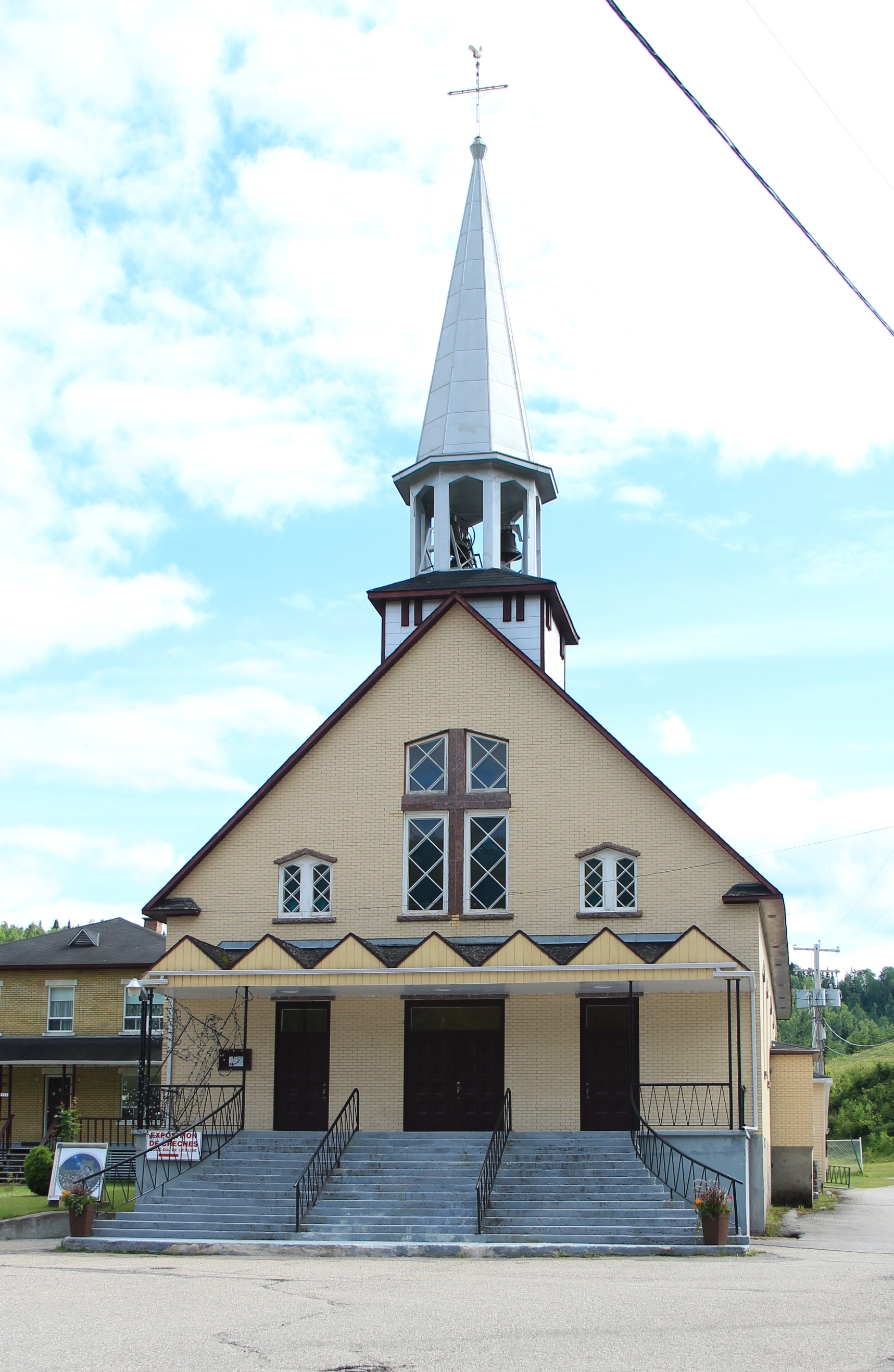
- Auberge du Presbytère in Rivière-Éternité

- Location in Saguenay–Lac-Saint-Jean Quebec.
- Coordinates: 48°15′20″N 70°24′50″W
- Country: Canada
- Province: Quebec
- Region: Saguenay–Lac-Saint-Jean
- RCM: Le Fjord-du-Saguenay
- Constituted: July 20, 1974

Government
  - Mayor: Rémi Gagné
  - Federal riding: Chicoutimi—Le Fjord
  - Prov. riding: Dubuc

Area
  - Total: 524.50 km^{2} (202.51 sq mi)
  - Land: 473.57 km^{2} (182.85 sq mi)

Population (2016)
  - Total: 413
  - Density: 0.79/km^{2} (2.0/sq mi)
  - Pop (2006–11): ▼13.1%
  - Dwellings: 376
- Time zone: UTC−5 (EST)
  - Summer (DST): UTC−4 (EDT)
- Postal code(s): G0V 1P0
- Area codes: 418 and 581
- Website: www.riviere-eternite.com

Rivière-Éternité (French pronunciation: [ʁivjɛʁ etɛʁnite]) is a municipality, being part of Le Fjord-du-Saguenay Regional County Municipality, in the administrative region of Saguenay–Lac-Saint-Jean, in Quebec, Canada.

== Geography ==
Rivière-Éternité is a small village in Quebec set in the valley of the Éternité River.

It is crossed by route 170.

== Toponymy ==
The Commission de toponymie du Québec writes about it: “The name of this municipality of Saguenay, officially created in 1974, was borrowed from the river that flows there. However, the reason for the designation of this tributary of the Saguenay River, collected between Cape Éternité and Cape Trinité, is unknown. Without doubt, the proximity of Cape Eternity, which evokes the beyond, played a role in the choice of this name which alludes to the absence of beginning and end of the existence of God. Before making us think of the beyond, the term evokes a very long duration. "

She continues: “The landscapes seem to have been fixed there forever and forever, majestically. This name, in addition to identifying the post office established in 1933 and the parish of Notre-Dame-de-l'Éternité erected canonically in 1967, covers the municipality located between Saint-Félix-d'Otis and L'Anse-Saint-Jean. It is the gateway to Saguenay National Park. The presence of water and impressive capes gives the eternity decor a magnificent magnificence in accordance with the extent of the territory which occupies an area of almost 500 km². The specific Eternity appears in documents written since at least 1824, according to the captain Louis Sivrac, and Arthur Buies indicates the cap Éternité, in 1880. "

== History ==
- July 20, 1974: Constitution of the "municipality of Rivière-Éternité" from unorganized territory.

== Demography ==
Historical population
Year	1996	2001	2006	2011	2016
Pop.	572	553	557	484	413
±%	—	−3.3%	+0.7%	−13.1%	−14.7%
Source: Census of Canada

The 2016 census counted 413 inhabitants, 13.1% less than in 2011.

== Administration ==
Municipal elections are held as a block for the mayor and the six councilors.

Rivière-Éternité; Mayors since 2001
Election	Mayor	Quality	Result
2001	Rémi Gagné		Voir
2005	Rémi Gagné		Voir
2009	Rémi Gagné		Voir
2013	Rémi Gagné		Voir
2017	Rémi Gagné		Voir
Élection partielle en italique Depuis 2005, les élections sont simultanées dans toutes les municipalités québécoises

== Attractions ==
One of its attractions is the Eternity Bay sector of the Saguenay Fjord National Park where the fjord reaches its maximum depth. The Cap Trinité path which leads to the statue of Notre-Dame-du-Saguenay offers one of the best views of the fjord.

== Gallery ==
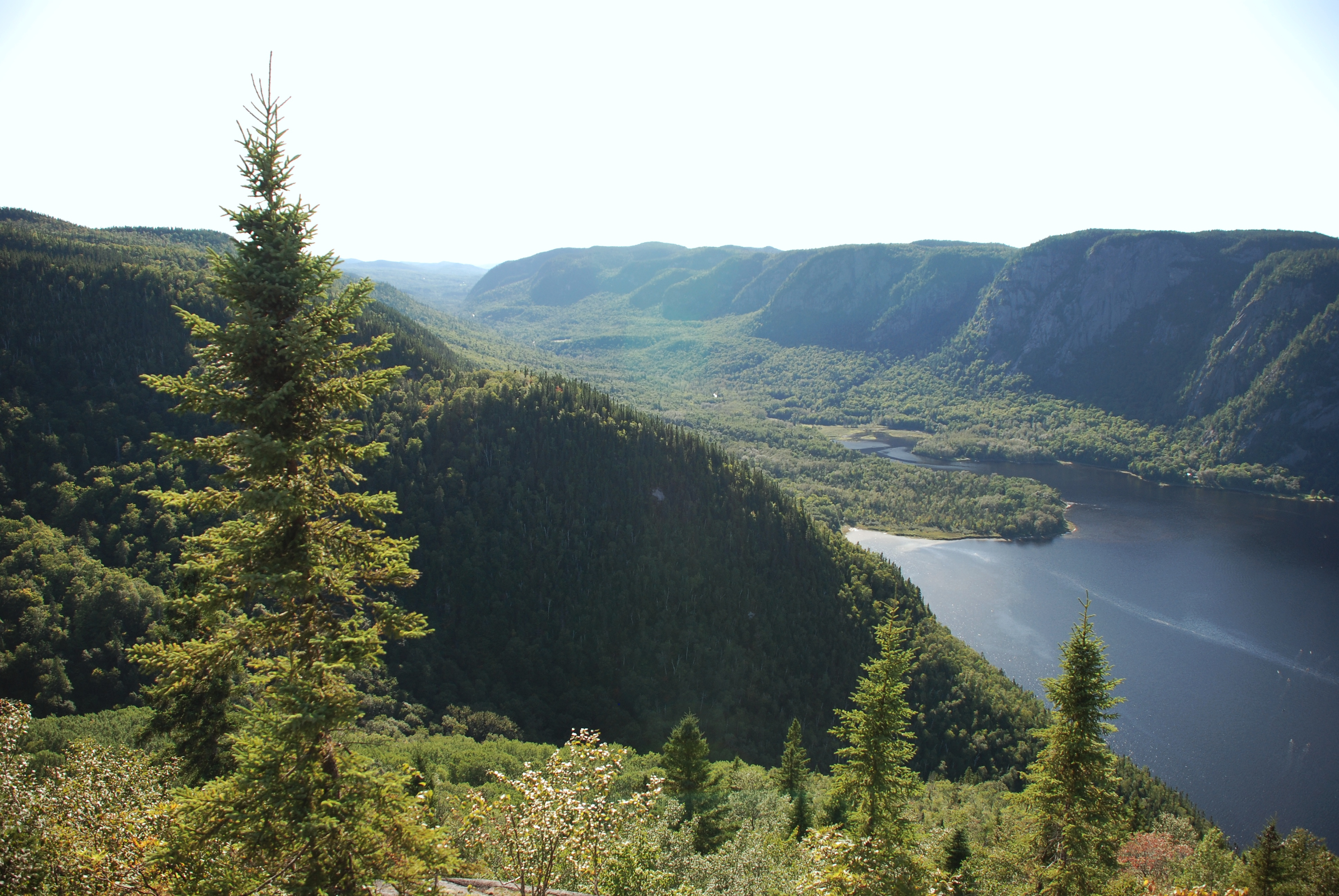
Baie Éternité seen from cap Éternité.

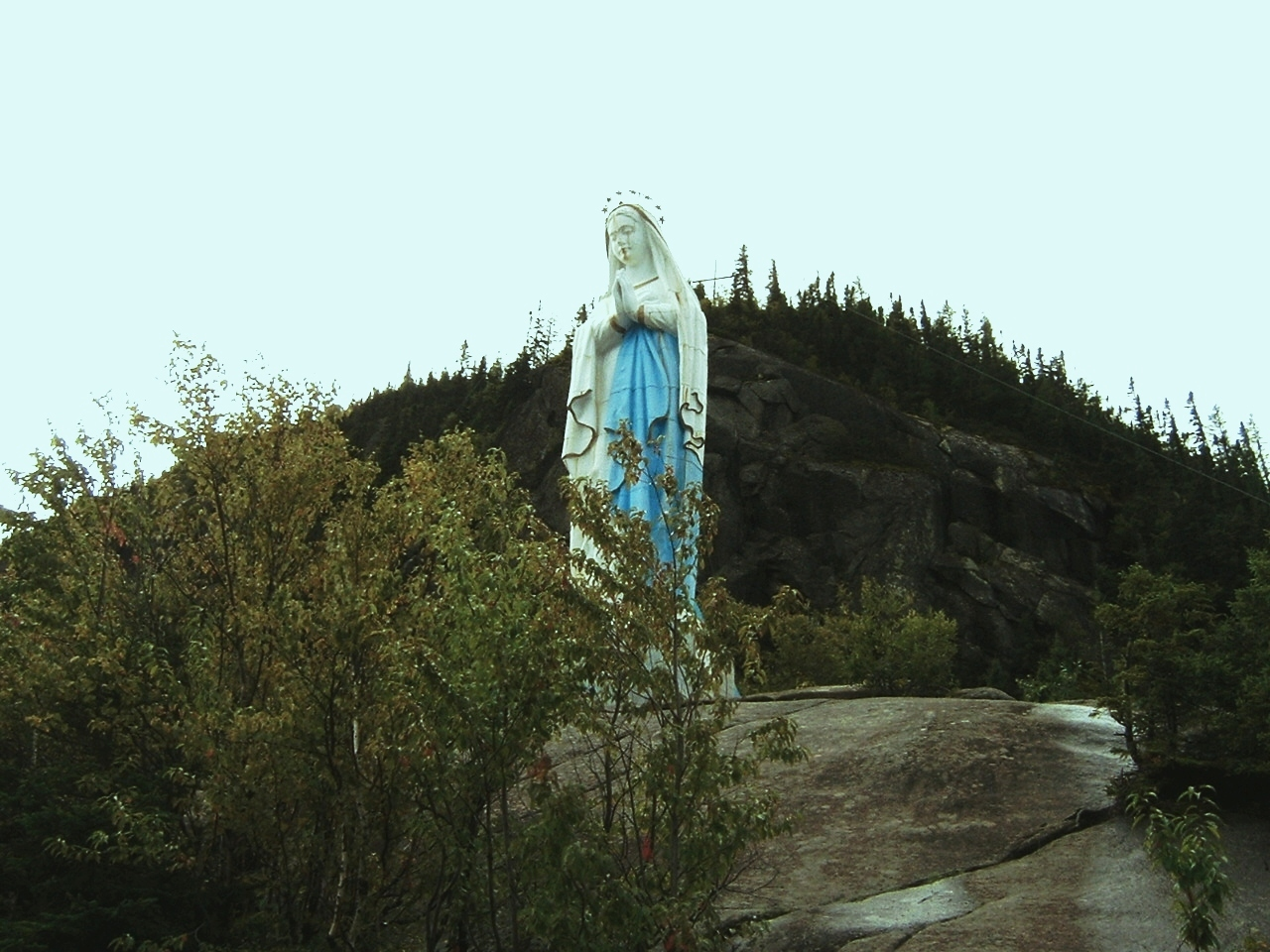
Statue of Notre-Dame-du-Saguenay.
