= L'Anse-Saint-Jean, Quebec =

L'Anse-Saint-Jean
- Municipality
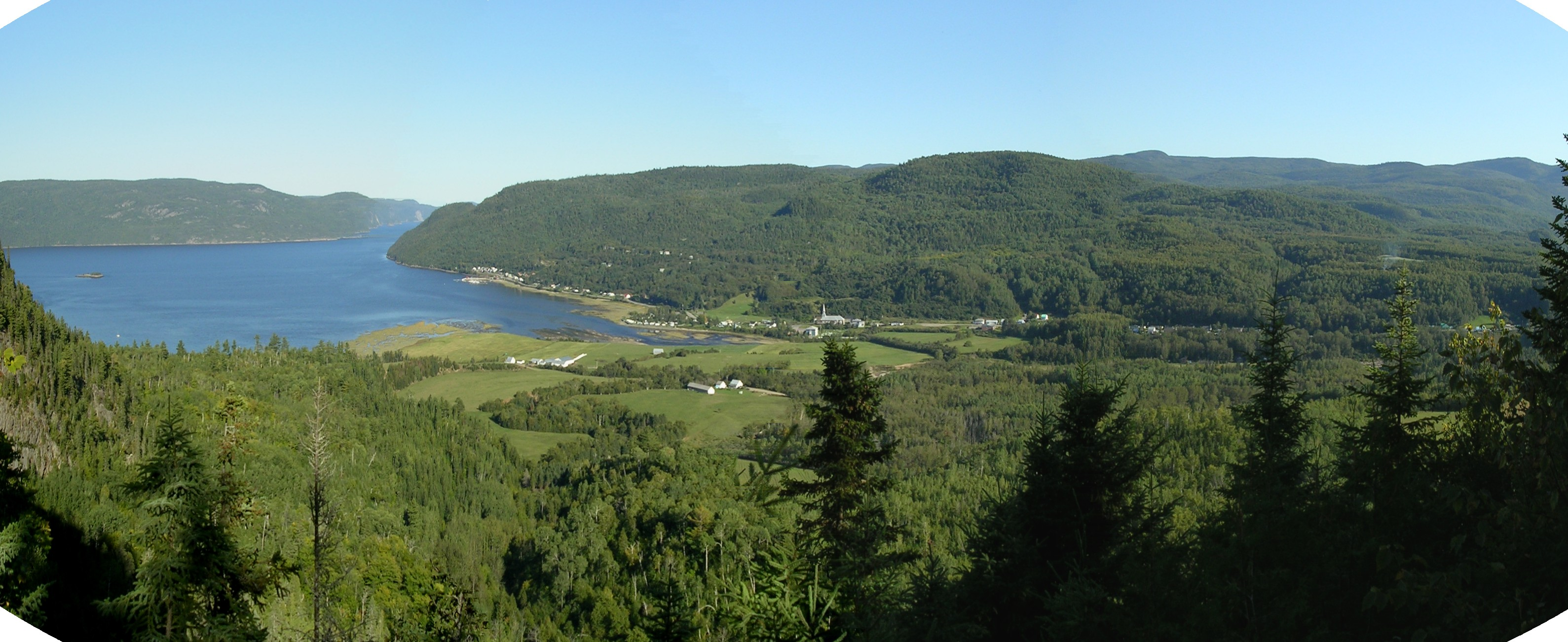

- Flag

- Location in Saguenay–Lac-Saint-Jean Quebec.
- Coordinates: 48°14′N 70°12′W
- Country: Canada
- Province: Quebec
- Region: Saguenay–Lac-Saint-Jean
- RCM: Le Fjord-du-Saguenay
- Settled: 1839
- Constituted: 1 January 1859

Government
  - Mayor: Richard Perron
  - Federal riding: Chicoutimi—Le Fjord
  - Prov. riding: Dubuc

Area
  - Total: 530.20 km^{2} (204.71 sq mi)
  - Land: 501.79 km^{2} (193.74 sq mi)

Population (2021)
  - Total: 1,301
  - Density: 2.6/km^{2} (6.7/sq mi)
  - Pop (2016–21): ▲8.3%
  - Dwellings: 961
- Time zone: UTC−5 (EST)
  - Summer (DST): UTC−4 (EDT)
- Postal code(s): G0V 1J0
- Area codes: 418 and 581
- Highways: R-170
- Website: www.lanse-saint-jean.ca

L'Anse-Saint-Jean (French pronunciation: [lɑ̃s sɛ̃ ʒɑ̃]), French for "The Cove of Saint John" is a municipality in the Saguenay–Lac-Saint-Jean region of Quebec, Canada. Its population was 1,301 in the Canada 2021 Census.

L'Anse-Saint-Jean was founded in 1838 by the Société des Vingt-et-un, a group of lumber prospectors and investors from Charlevoix which was responsible for opening up the Saguenay region to colonization.

The village achieved some fame in 1997 when its citizens voted in a referendum to declare the village a "municipal monarchy" as the Kingdom of L'Anse Saint Jean.

== History ==
=== Kingdom of L'Anse-Saint-Jean ===
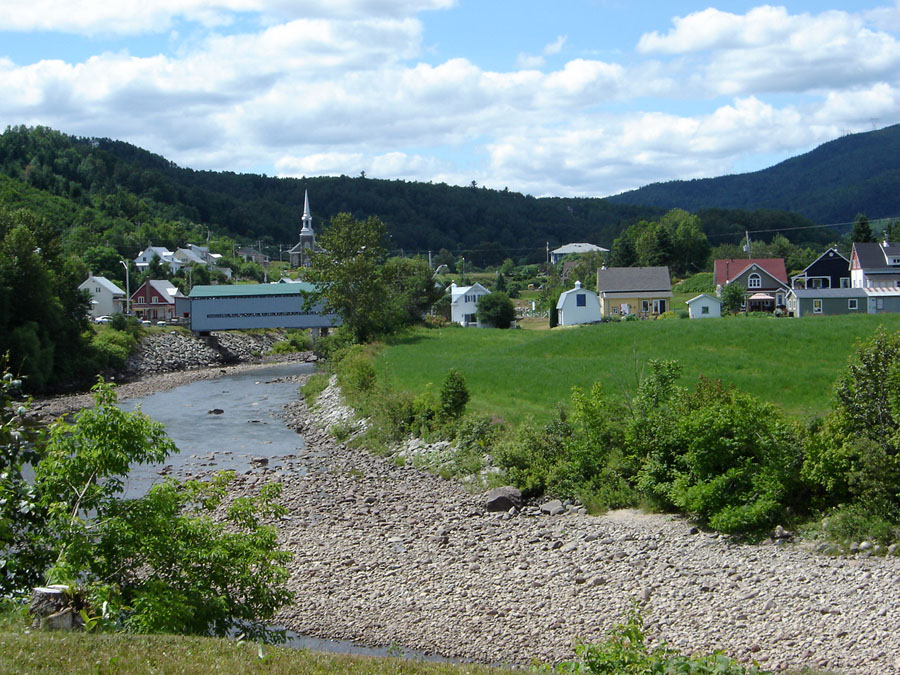
View of the river

The village's citizens held a referendum on 21 January 1997, to turn the village into Le Royaume de L'Anse-Saint-Jean (the kingdom of L'Anse Saint Jean), the continent's first "municipal monarchy." The monarchists won 73.9% of the vote, with Denys Tremblay becoming King Denys I. The king was crowned on 24 June, Saint-Jean-Baptiste Day, in the Église Saint-Jean-Baptiste, and announced plans to build a "vegetable oratory," Saint-Jean-du-Millénaire (Saint John of the Millennium).

This micronational project was cheerfully conceded to be a way of boosting tourism in the region, which had been hit by the 1996 Saguenay Flood.

Denys I abdicated on 14 January 2000, bringing the purported kingdom to an end.

== Gallery ==
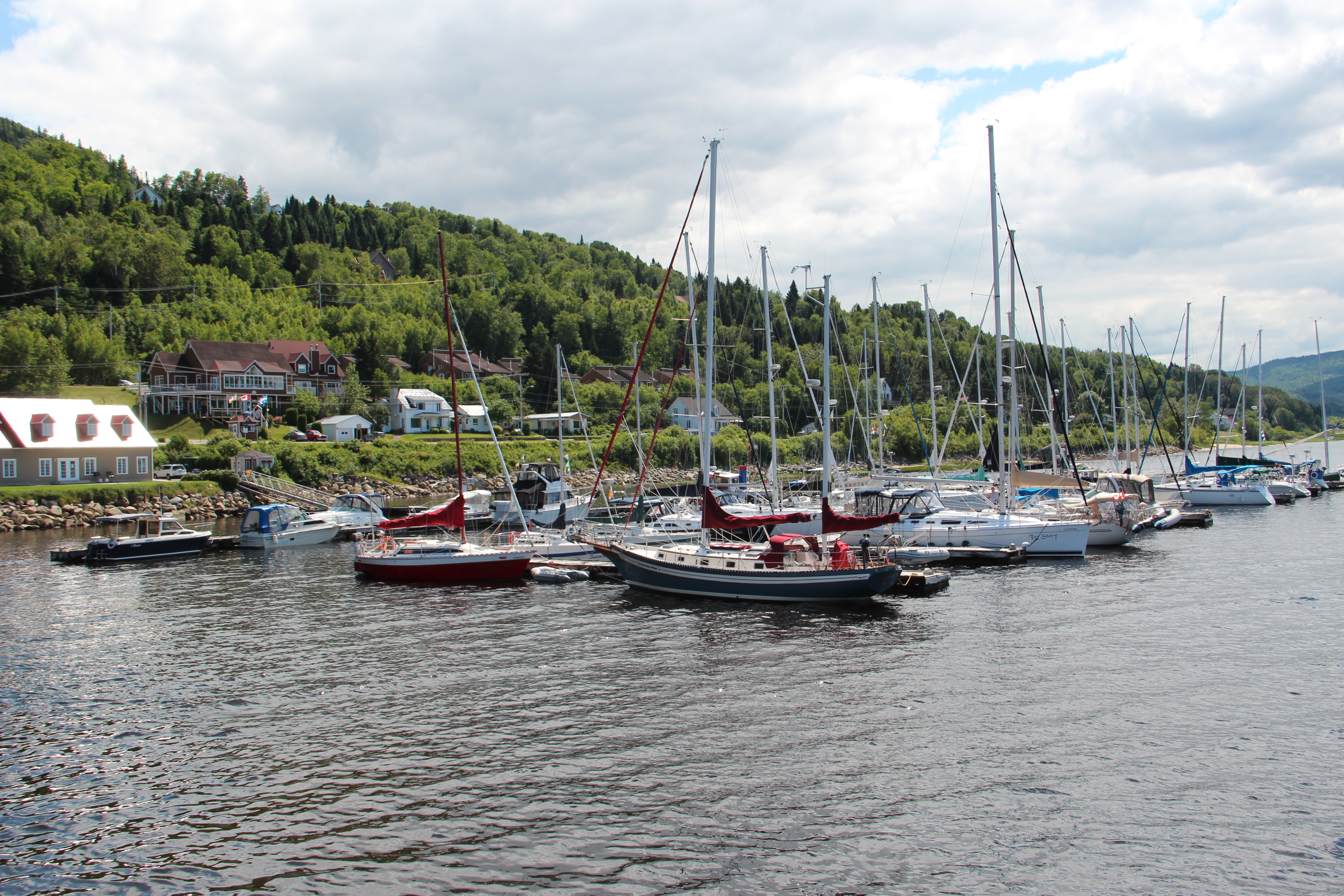
View of the marina
