= Local municipality (Quebec) =

Administrative division of the province of Quebec, Canada

The local municipality (French: municipalité locale) is the lowest unit of local government in Quebec, Canada and is distinguished from the higher-level regional county municipality, or RCM, a municipal government at the supralocal level.

Eight municipalities are further subdivided into boroughs.

There are also eleven agglomerations grouping a number of municipalities and exercising some of the powers that would be exercised by a municipality elsewhere in Quebec.

With the exception of some Aboriginal communities, municipalities are governed by the Towns and Cities Act and the Municipal Code of Québec.

== See also ==
- List of municipalities in Quebec
- List of communities in Quebec
- Classification of municipalities in Quebec
- 21st-century municipal history of Quebec
- Municipal reorganization in Quebec
- List of boroughs in Quebec
- Administrative divisions of Quebec
- Kativik Regional Government
