= Le Fjord-du-Saguenay Regional County Municipality =

Le Fjord-du-Saguenay
- Regional county municipality
- Coordinates: 48°27′N 70°54′W
- Country: Canada
- Province: Quebec
- Region: Saguenay–Lac-Saint-Jean
- Effective: February 18, 2002
- County seat: Saint-Honoré

Government
  - Type: Prefecture
  - Prefect: Jean-Marie Claveau

Area
  - Total: 43,462.00 km^{2} (16,780.77 sq mi)
  - Land: 40,232.50 km^{2} (15,533.86 sq mi)

Population (2016)
  - Total: 21,600
  - Density: 0.5/km^{2} (1.3/sq mi)
  - Change 2011-2016: ▲5.5%
  - Dwellings: 11,910
- Time zone: UTC−5 (EST)
  - Summer (DST): UTC−4 (EDT)
- Area codes: 418 and 581
- Website: www.mrc-fjord.qc.ca

Le Fjord-du-Saguenay (French pronunciation: [lə fjɔʁ dy saɡnɛ], The Fjord of the Saguenay [river]) is a regional county municipality in the Saguenay-Lac-Saint-Jean region of Quebec, Canada. Its seat is Saint-Honoré, which is also its most populous municipality.

It is named for the fjord part of the Saguenay River, protruding out of the Saint Lawrence River into the southern section of the RCM. It is located adjacent to the city of Saguenay and practically surrounds it. It has a land area of 40,232.41 km^{2} (15,533.82 sq mi) and a Canada 2011 Census population of 20,465 inhabitants.

Le Fjord-du-Saguenay is one of the few regional county municipalities in Quebec that does not constitute its own census division; instead, it is grouped with Saguenay as the single census division of Le Saguenay-et-son-Fjord; the territory of the census division corresponds exactly to that of the old pre-2002 Le Fjord-du-Saguenay regional county municipality.

== Subdivisions ==
There are 16 subdivisions within the RCM:

Cities & Towns (1)

- Saint-Honoré

Municipalities (11)

- Bégin
- Ferland-et-Boilleau
- L'Anse-Saint-Jean
- Larouche
- Petit-Saguenay
- Rivière-Éternité
- Saint-Ambroise
- Saint-Charles-de-Bourget
- Saint-David-de-Falardeau
- Saint-Félix-d'Otis
- Saint-Fulgence

Parishes (1)

- Sainte-Rose-du-Nord

Unorganized Territory (3)

- Lac-Ministuk
- Lalemant
- Mont-Valin

== History ==
Le Fjord-du-Saguenay was originally created in 1982, consisting mostly of the former historic County of Chicoutimi except for a few Municipalities which were taken from parts of the historic county of Lac-Saint-Jean-Est. In 2002, the cities of Chicoutimi, Jonquière, La Baie and the surrounding area amalgamated and became the City of Saguenay at which point they separated from the RCM; the post-2002 Le Fjord-du-Saguenay consists of the remainder of the original. After the departure of Saguenay, its largest community is the municipality of Saint-Honoré, with a 2011 census population of 5257 inhabitants.

== Transportation ==
=== Access Routes ===
Highways and numbered routes that run through the municipality, including external routes that start or finish at the county border:

Autoroutes

- A-70

Principal Highways

- R-170
- R-172
- R-175

Secondary Highways

- R-381

External Routes

- None

== See also ==
- List of regional county municipalities and equivalent territories in Quebec
