= Portage River (Petit-Saguenay River tributary) =

Rivière du Portage
- Location within Quebec
- Etymology: a

Location
- Country: Canada
- Province: Quebec
- Region: Saguenay-Lac-Saint-Jean
- Regional County Municipality: Le Fjord-du-Saguenay Regional County Municipality
- Municipalities: L'Anse-Saint-Jean and Petit-Saguenay

Physical characteristics
- Source: Lac à Noël
  - location: L'Anse-Saint-Jean
  - coordinates: 48.03543°N 70.29685°W
  - elevation: 472 m (1,549 ft)
- Mouth: Petit Saguenay River
  - location: Petit-Saguenay
  - coordinates: 48.16666°N 70.0525°W
  - elevation: 70 m (230 ft)
- Length: 42.5 km (26.4 mi)
- Discharge
  - location: Petit-Saguenay

Basin features
- Tributaries
  - left: (from the mouth) Outlet of Cardinal Lake, outlet of "lac à l'Épaule" (Shoulder Lake), ruisseau Petite Poussière, outlet of "Lac de la Rivière" (which receive the water from "ruisseau de la Petite Passe"), outlet of a set of lakes such "Lac à foin".
  - right: (from the mouth) Outlet of "lac Long", outlet of Apolite Lake, ruisseau de la Sucrerie, outlet of "lac du Portage", outlet of lakes Jean Ré, Réno and "du Treuil", outlet of "lac du pont", outlet of Crisimont Lake, outlet of lakes Wipi and Chilien, outlet of lakes Tony and "de la Loutre", outlet of Réal Lake, outlet of "Grand lac Jumeau" and "Petit lac Jumeau", outlet of "lac de l'Apendice".

The River Portage, a tributary of the southwestern shore of the Petit Saguenay River flowing successively in the municipalities of L'Anse-Saint-Jean and Petit-Saguenay in the Le Fjord-du-Saguenay Regional County Municipality, in the administrative region of Saguenay-Lac-Saint-Jean, in Quebec, in Canada. The upper part of this river crosses the Zec de l'Anse-Saint-Jean.

The lower portion of the "rivière du Portage" Valley is indirectly served by Route 170 which passes on this point on the east bank of the Petit Saguenay River. The upper part, especially around the "Lac de la Rivière" is served by the "chemin du Portage". Some secondary forest roads serve the rest of the valley, especially in the zec.

Forestry is the first economic activity in the sector; recreational tourism activities, second.

The surface of the Portage River is usually frozen from the beginning of December to the end of March, however, safe ice circulation is generally from mid-December to mid-March.

== Geography ==
The main hydrographic slopes near the Portage River are:

- North side: Petit Saguenay River, Saguenay River;
- East side: Petit Saguenay River, Saint-Athanase River, Saint-Étienne River;
- South side: Dallaire Creek, Petit Saguenay River;
- West side: Saint-Jean River.

The Portage River is the main tributary of the Petit Saguenay River. It takes its source from the "lake à Noël" (length: 2.7 km (1.7 mi); altitude: 472 m (1,549 ft)) which is enclosed by mountain cliffs; its mouth is located to the northeast.

This headwater body is located between the Mont à l'Ours (Bear Mount) (880 m (2,890 ft)) and East Mount 712 m (2,336 ft)), in the southern part of Zec de l'Anse-Saint-Jean.

From its source, the mouth of the lake at Christmas, the course of the Portage River descends on 42.5 km (26.4 mi) according to the following segments:

Upper part of the Portage River (segment of 19.1 km (11.9 mi))

- 2.7 km (1.7 mi) to the North, including crossing Piat Lake (length: 2.4 km (1.5 mi); altitude: 471 m (1,545 ft)) on its full length, to its mouth;
- 1.9 km (1.2 mi) to the North, in particular by crossing the Huet Lake (length: 0.6 km (0.37 mi); altitude: 429 m (1,407 ft)) on its full length, to its mouth;
- 1.3 km (0.81 mi) northerly forming a loop to the southeast to the outlet (coming from the west) of some lakes in the area of the hamlet "La Grande-Allée";
- 2.2 km (1.4 mi) northeasterly forming a northward loop, collecting the discharge (from the south) of a lake, then crossing a swamp bend of a river corresponding to a creek (coming from the east);
- 6.7 km (4.2 mi) northerly beginning in marsh zone, relatively straight across a long series of rapids in a steep valley, up to a river bend, corresponding to the discharge (coming from southwest) of Rivière Lake;
- 4.3 km (2.7 mi) northeasterly, snaking through a steep valley to a bend in the river;

Lower section of the Portage River (segment of 23.4 km (14.5 mi))

- 7.3 km (4.5 mi) east in a steep valley, up to a river bend;
- 2.3 km (1.4 mi) northeasterly in a concealed valley to Petite Poussière Creek (from the west);
- 5.5 km (3.4 mi) northeasterly in a steep valley, collecting the dump (coming from the west) of a lake, then forming a small hook to the north at the end of the segment, until the discharge (from the west) of a lake;
- 8.3 km (5.2 mi) northeasterly, snaking through a valley flared towards its lower part to its mouth.

The mouth of the "rivière du Portage" empties onto the west bank of the Petit Saguenay River. This confluence is located at:

- 13.4 km (8.3 mi) south-east of the village center of L'Anse-Saint-Jean;
- 5.3 km (3.3 mi) northwest of the village center of Petit-Saguenay;
- 8.3 km (5.2 mi) southeast of the confluence of the Petit Saguenay River with the Saguenay River;
- 25.7 km (16.0 mi) west of Tadoussac.

== Toponymy ==
In Quebec toponymy, nine rivers are designated "Portage River". This name refers to the need for carrying boats (usually canoes) and equipment to pass an obstacle on the river.

The toponym "Rivière du Portage" (Petit-Sagnenay) was formalized on December 5, 1968, at the Bank of Place Names of the Commission de toponymie du Québec.

== See also ==
- Petit Saguenay River
- Le Fjord-du-Saguenay Regional County Municipality
- L'Anse-Saint-Jean
- Petit-Saguenay
- Zec de l'Anse-Saint-Jean
- List of rivers of Quebec
