= Bazile Lake (Mont-Élie) =

Lake in Mont-Élie, Quebec, Canada

- Location in Quebec
- Location: Mont-Élie
- Coordinates: 47.98555°N 70.38528°W
- Lake type: Natural
- Primary inflows: la coulée du Bazile, Plusieurs ruisseaux de montagnes et la décharge des lacs Ludger et Marco
- Primary outflows: Ruisseau Bazile
- Basin countries: Canada
- Max. length: 3.8 km (2.4 mi)
- Max. width: 1.6 km (0.99 mi)
- Surface elevation: 519 m (1,703 ft)

The lac Bazile is a body of water on the hydrographic side of the Petit Saguenay River, in the unorganized territory of Mont-Élie, in the Charlevoix-Est Regional County Municipality of the administrative region Capitale-Nationale, in Quebec, in Canada.

A forest road runs along the south shore of Lac Bazile. Another forest road runs along the northeast part of the lake. These roads join the Périgny road north.

Forestry is the main economic activity in the sector; recreational tourism, second.

The surface of Bazile Lake is usually frozen from the end of November to the beginning of April, however the safe circulation on the ice is generally done from mid-December to the end of March.

== Geography ==
The main watersheds near Lake Bazile are:

- north side: Bras à Pierre;
- east side: Petit Saguenay River;
- south side: Pont stream, Malbaie River;
- west side: Épinglette brook, Coulée du Bazile, Malbaie River.

Lac Bazile is 3.8 km (2.4 mi) long and 1.6 km (0.99 mi) wide. This lake takes the shape of a turtle back.

The mouth of Lac Bazile is located at:

- 1.3 km (0.81 mi) west of Lac des Caleçons;
- 6.8 km (4.2 mi) west of Lac au Bouleau;
- 22.8 km (14.2 mi) south-west of the village of Sagard where the route 170 passes;
- 31.9 km (19.8 mi) south of the mouth of the Petit Saguenay River at L'Anse-Saint-Jean.

From the mouth of Bazile Lake, the current descends the Bazile stream for 10.3 km (6.4 mi) to the east crossing Lac des Caleçons (length: 2.2 km (1.4 mi)) and Fraser Lake, to the west shore of lac au Sable; the current then crosses this lake over 0.9 km (0.56 mi) north to its mouth; then the current descends the Petit Saguenay River on 44.4 km (27.6 mi) towards the northeast, then north to the south bank of the Saguenay River which the current crosses on 36.6 km (22.7 mi) eastwards to Tadoussac where this last river flows into the Saint Lawrence River.

== Toponymy ==
The term "Bazile" is a first name of French origin.

The toponym Lac Bazile was formalized on December 5, 1968, by the Commission de toponymie du Québec.
