= Zec de la Rivière-Petit-Saguenay =

- Location within Quebec
- Location: Canada, Quebec, Le Fjord-du-Saguenay Regional County Municipality
- Nearest city: Saguenay
- Coordinates: 48°12′06″N 70°03′40″W
- Area: Length of 14 kilometres (8.7 mi) on the Petit Saguenay River and on Rivière du Portage (Petit-Saguenay)
- Established: 1998
- Governing body: Association de la rivière Petit-Saguenay

Zec de la Rivière-Petit-Saguenay is a "zone d'exploitation contrôlée" (controlled harvesting zone) (zec) located in the municipality of Petit-Saguenay, in Le Fjord-du-Saguenay Regional County Municipality, in administrative region of Saguenay–Lac-Saint-Jean, in Quebec, in Canada.

Established in 1998, this zec is administered by "Association de la rivière Petit-Saguenay" which is a nonprofit organization. This Association obtained the Regional Win in the category "Outdoor activities and leisure" at the "Grands Prix du Tourisme Québécois 2010".

Since 2014, a Charter for the Protection of Atlantic salmon certify fishermen, traders, artisans and citizens ready to commit to a sports manager and guarantor of the future.

== Geography ==
Several bodies of water in the Laurentides Wildlife Reserve form the head of the Petit Saguenay River at around 625 meters above sea level. With a length of 77 kilometres (48 mi), the Petit Saguenay River covers a drainage basin of 441 square kilometres (170 sq mi) and average river flow is 16 cubic metres per second (570 cu ft/s). It flows between high and majestic mountains eastward to Sagard. Then the river heads north through the village of Petit-Saguenay, and at 3.2 kilometres (2.0 mi) further reaches its mouth. Between Sagard and Petit-Saguenay, the route 170 run along the river.

The mouth of the river is located at the bottom of the cove Petit-Saguenay (partially closed by a jetty), in the municipality of Petit-Saguenay where the waters flow into Le Fjord-du-Saguenay. The handle is located at 34.7 kilometres (21.6 mi) (measured by water) upstream of the mouth of the Saguenay River.

The main tributary of the Petit Saguenay River is Portage River (Petit-Saguenay) which flows eastward; the mouth of the latter is 9.3 kilometres (5.8 mi) south of the mouth of the Petit Saguenay River.

== Fishing ==
The Atlantic salmon abound in the Petit Saguenay River. The annual salmon run to spawning is favored by a riverbed formed shingle with stones, gravel and sand. Minerals suspended water tinted a light brown. The average flow of the river current is 16 cubic metres per second (570 cu ft/s). The river has 13 kilometres (8.1 mi) of river where 24 water pits are arranged and easily accessible; fishing area also includes a kilometer on the Portage River (Petit-Saguenay).

The pits are divided into four areas of which three are subject to fishing quotas. In Area 1, the unrestricted encompasses pits 3-23, except the pit 19. The latter belongs to the sector 3 which is subject to quota. In addition, the pit 19 is the Portage River (Petit-Saguenay), dependent on the Petit-Saguenay River. Area 2 includes the pit 24 and sector 4 includes pits 1 and 2 generally pits are easily spot because it is well identified. These pits in the river are less than 30 meters from the road.

Anglers can easily access via a footpath to the pits # 9 (Cascade) to # 23 (landing), except the pit # 19.

Anglers can fish for sea trout (fly or light tackle) in the Saguenay Fjord (at the mouth of the river). Sea trout is an anadromous brook trout, immigrant fjord (salt water) to its native river (fresh water) to reproduce.

Apart from the Atlantic salmon, six other species abound in the Petit-Saguenay River: the brook trout (also called "speckled trout" or "sea trout"), the longnose dace, the fallfish, the American eel, the suckers and l'épinoche.

== Attractions ==
The "Association de la Rivière Petit-Saguenay" (Association of Petit-Saguenay River) provides opportunities for canoe down on a segment of 12 kilometres (7.5 mi), in the area of "eaux mortes" (dead water) on Petit-Saguenay River. This river segment has a wild and great length by meandering shaped stones pushed by the current.

An easy 3.0 kilometres (1.9 mi) linear trail along the Petit-Saguenay River, allows nature lovers to observe the landscape and Atlantic salmon at the observatory of the "fosse Poussière" (dust pit) (#16) and cross a river on a suspended bridge or chat with the salmon fishermen. At the observatory of the pit #24, visitors can see the salmon in full action, performing quantum leaps while attempting to ascend the falls, showing their fighting spirit. Periods favorable for salmon runs are in July.

"The site of the cottages of the Petit-Saguenay River", located near the reception office of the Zec, has five chalets heritage character in vintage buildings well preserved. The Association also offers accommodation in two other cottages. It also offers 25 camping sites at the Petit-Saguenay River. The zec was winner in the "Camping in the Saguenay-Lac-St-Jean" category at the "Grands Prix du Tourisme Québécois 2001". This camp is in harmony with nature. The "Association de la Rivière Petit-Saguenay" proposes to rent a yurt along the river in summer and winter, near the reception office. The yurt is a traditional dwelling of the nomads living in the steppes of Central Asia. The yurt combines charm and rusticity.

== Toponymy ==
The name of the zec is directly related to the toponyms of Petit Saguenay River, the municipality Petit-Saguenay and the cove "Anse Petit-Saguenay".

The toponym of "Zec de la Rivière-Petit-Saguenay" was officialized on April 30, 1999 at the Bank of place names of the Commission de toponymie du Québec (Geographical Names Board of Quebec).

== See also ==
- Petit-Saguenay, municipality
- Saguenay River
- Le Fjord-du-Saguenay Regional County Municipality
- Saguenay-Lac-Saint-Jean
- Saguenay Fjord National Park
- Sagard
- Zone d'exploitation contrôlée (controlled harvesting zone) (zec)
