= Emmuraillé Lake =

Lake in Sagard, Quebec, Canada

- Location in Quebec
- Location: Sagard
- Coordinates: 47.995°N 70.25755°W
- Lake type: Natural
- Primary inflows: Petit Saguenay River, outlet of lac Pilote
- Primary outflows: Petit Saguenay River
- Basin countries: Canada
- Max. length: 1.8 km (1.1 mi)
- Max. width: 0.9 km (0.56 mi)
- Surface elevation: 436 m (1,430 ft)

The Emmuraillé Lake is a body of water crossed in its eastern part by the Petit Saguenay River, in the unorganized territory of Sagard, in the Charlevoix-Est Regional County Municipality of the administrative region of Capitale-Nationale, in Quebec, in Canada.

The "Emmuraillé Lake" is indirectly served by the forest road R064 which passes on the west side and bypasses Lac Pilote.

Forestry is the sector's main economic activity; recreotourism activities, second.

== Geography ==
The main watersheds near Emmuraillé lake are:

- north side: Petit Saguenay River;
- east side: Onésime Lake, McLagan Lake, Étienne Brook, Deschênes Lake, Deschênes River, Noire River;
- south side: lac au Bouleau, lac au Sable, Petit Saguenay River;
- west side: Pilote Lake, Pilote Creek.

The Emmuraillé lake has a length of 1.8 km (1.1 mi). The Petit Saguenay River successively crosses from south to north lac au Sable (length: 2.7 km (1.7 mi); altitude: 449 m (1,473 ft)), lac au Bouleau (length: 4.3 km (2.7 mi); altitude: 449 m (1,473 ft)) and the eastern part of Lac Emmuraillé (length: 1.8 km (1.1 mi); altitude: 436 m (1,430 ft)).

The mouth of Emmuraillé Lake is located at:

- 12.9 km (8.0 mi) west of Deschênes Lake;
- 27.6 km (17.1 mi) south of the village center Petit-Saguenay;
- 28.6 km (17.8 mi) south of the confluence of the Petit Saguenay River and Anse du Petit Saguenay located on the south shore of the Saguenay River.

From the mouth of Lac Emmuraillé, the current descends the Petit Saguenay River for 64.8 km (40.3 mi) north, northeast, then north to the south bank of the Saguenay River; thence, the current then descends on 36.6 km (22.7 mi) the Saguenay River east to Tadoussac where the latter river flows into the Saint Lawrence River.

== Toponymy ==
The toponym "Lac Emmuraillé" was formalized on December 5, 1968, by the Commission de toponymie du Québec.

== See also ==
- Charlevoix-Est, a MRC
- Sagard, a TNO
- Petit Saguenay River
- Lac au Sable
- Lac au Bouleau
