= Petites Îles River =

Rivière des Petites Îles (River of Little Island)
- Location within Quebec

Location
- Country: Canada
- Province: Quebec
- Region: Saguenay-Lac-Saint-Jean
- Regional County Municipality: Le Fjord-du-Saguenay Regional County Municipality
- Municipalities: Petit-Saguenay and Baie-Sainte-Catherine

Physical characteristics
- Source: Lake Ovila-Lavoie
  - location: Petit-Saguenay
  - coordinates: 48.15559°N 69.95730°W
  - elevation: 129 m (423 ft)
- Mouth: Saguenay River
  - location: Baie-Sainte-Catherine
  - coordinates: 48.15092°N 69.95794°W
  - elevation: 3 m (9.8 ft)
- Length: 9.7 km (6.0 mi)
- Discharge
  - location: Baie-Sainte-Catherine

Basin features
- Tributaries
  - left: (from the mouth) Décharge du Lac des Couteaux, décharge d'un ensemble de lacs lacs dont Pipiche, Coquille, de l'Île et de l'Orme, ruisseau des Îles.
  - right: (from the mouth) Décharge du Lac du Compte, décharge des lacs Loriot, du Coucou et Double.

The rivière des Petites Îles (Petites Îles River) is a tributary of the south shore of the Saguenay River flowing successively in the municipalities of Petit-Saguenay and Baie-Sainte-Catherine, in Regional County Municipality (MRC) of Le Fjord-du-Saguenay, in Quebec, Canada.

The upper part of this valley is served indirectly by Route 170 which connects Saint-Siméon to the village of Petit-Saguenay which passes over the north shore of the Noire River. Despite its mountainous terrain, the valley of the "Petites Îles River" has some secondary forest roads for forestry and recreational tourism purposes.

Forestry is the first economic activity in the sector; recreational tourism activities, second.

The surface of Petites Îles River is usually frozen from the beginning of December to the end of March, however, safe ice circulation is generally from mid-December to mid-March.

== Geography ==
The main hydrographic slopes near the Petites Îles River are:

- North side: Saguenay River;
- East side: St. Lawrence River;
- South side: Petit Saguenay River;
- West side: Petit Saguenay River, Cabanage River.

The Petites Îles River rises at the mouth of Lake Ovila-Lavoie. This source is located at:

- 5.9 km (3.7 mi) south-west of its mouth;
- 6.8 km (4.2 mi) east of a curve of Petit Saguenay River;
- 18.4 km (11.4 mi) west of the mouth of the Saguenay River;
- 10.5 km (6.5 mi) south-east of the village center of Petit-Saguenay.

From its source (Lake Ovila-Lavoie), the course of the Petites Îles River descends on 9.7 km (6.0 mi) according to the following segments:

- 0.6 km (0.37 mi) northerly to a river bend corresponding to the discharge (from the North) of a group of lakes including Pipiche, Coquille, Île and L'Orme;
- 2.8 km (1.7 mi) northeasterly, forming a curve to the south, and crossing rapids at the end of the segment;

to the dump (coming from the east) of Lac du Compte;

- 2.2 km (1.4 mi) northeasterly in a steep valley to the outlet of Lac des Couteaux;
- 4.1 km (2.5 mi) easterly in a valley through the Saguenay Fjord National Park to its mouth.

The mouth of the Petites Îles River flows into Anse aux Petites Îles on the south shore of the Saguenay River at the northwestern end of the Municipality of Baie-Sainte-Catherine. This confluence is located at:

- 26.3 km (16.3 mi) east of the village center of L'Anse-Saint-Jean;
- 18.2 km (11.3 mi) east of the confluence of the Petit Saguenay River with the Saguenay River;
- 15.6 km (9.7 mi) west of Tadoussac.

== Toponymy ==
The toponym "Rivière des Petites Îles" (Little Islands River) refers to the presence of two small islands located in the cove at the mouth of this stream. The name of the first, Coquart Island, evokes the memory of the Jesuit father Claude-Godefroy Coquart, born in 1706 in the French commune of Melun. "Anse aux Petites Îles" is bounded on the north by "Pointe aux Petites Îles".

The toponym "Rivière des Petites Îles" was formalized on December 5, 1968, at the Bank of Place Names of the Commission de toponymie du Québec.

== See also ==
- Petit-Saguenay, a municipality
- Baie-Sainte-Catherine, a municipality
- Saguenay Fjord National Park
- Saguenay River, a watercourse
- List of rivers of Quebec
