= Saint-Athanase River =

- Location within Quebec
- Native name: Rivière Saint-Athanase (French)

Location
- Country: Canada
- Province: Quebec
- Region: Saguenay-Lac-Saint-Jean
- Regional County Municipality: Le Fjord-du-Saguenay Regional County Municipality
- Municipalities: Petit-Saguenay

Physical characteristics
- Source: Petit lac Alphée
  - location: Petit-Saguenay
  - coordinates: 48.18852°N 70.01503°W
  - elevation: 183 m (600 ft)
- Mouth: Saguenay River
  - location: Petit-Saguenay
  - coordinates: 48.22972°N 69.9775°W
  - elevation: 3 m (9.8 ft)
- Length: 9.7 km (6.0 mi)
- Discharge
  - location: Petit-Saguenay

Basin features
- Tributaries
  - left: (from the mouth) Décharge d'un ensemble de petits lacs, décharge d'un ensemble de petits lacs.
  - right: (from the mouth) Décharge d'un ensemble de petits lacs, décharge d'un lac non identifié, décharge de 4 petits lacs.

The Saint-Athanase River is a tributary of the south shore of the Saguenay River flowing into the municipality of Petit-Saguenay in the Le Fjord-du-Saguenay Regional County Municipality, Quebec, Canada.

The Saint-Athanase River Valley is mainly served by Saint-Louis Road and Saint-Etienne Road.

Forestry is the first economic activity in the sector; recreational tourism activities, second.

The surface of the Saint-Athanase River is usually frozen from the beginning of December to the end of March, however, safe ice circulation is generally from mid-December to mid-March.

== Geography ==
The main hydrographic slopes near the Saint-Athanase River are:

- North side: Saguenay River;
- East side: Saint-Étienne River, Petites Îles River, St. Lawrence River;
- South side: Petit Saguenay River;
- West side: Petit Saguenay River, Cabanage River.

The Saint-Athanase River rises at the mouth of Petit Lac Alphée (length: 0.3 km (0.19 mi); altitude: 183 m (600 ft)). This source is located at:

- 5.4 km (3.4 mi) south of its mouth (confluence with the Saguenay River);
- 2.6 km (1.6 mi) northeast of the Petit Saguenay River;
- 23.8 km (14.8 mi) west of the mouth of the Saguenay River;
- 4.9 km (3.0 mi) east of the village center of Petit-Saguenay.

From its source (Petit Lac Alphée), the course of the Saint-Athanase River descends on 8.6 km (5.3 mi) according to the following segments:

- 0.6 km (0.37 mi) to the north, in particular, crossing the Alphée lake (length: 0.4 km (0.25 mi); altitude: 164 m (538 ft)) on 0.6 km (0.37 mi) to its mouth;
- 0.5 km (0.31 mi) easterly, forming a curve to the north, to the discharge (coming from the north) of a group of small lakes;
- 1.0 km (0.62 mi) easterly forming at the beginning of a segment a hook to the south, to the discharge (coming from the south) of a set of small lakes;
- 1.4 km (0.87 mi) northerly forming a large S, to the discharge (from the east) of an unidentified lake;
- 2.4 km (1.5 mi) northerly, curving to the northeast, to the discharge (from the east) of a set of unidentified lakes;
- 0.8 km (0.50 mi) northwesterly to a dump of unidentified lakes;
- 1.9 km (1.2 mi) north in a steep valley curving westward around a large mountain to its mouth.

The mouth of the Saint-Athanase River flows into the bottom of "Anse au Cheval" on the south shore of the Saguenay River. This confluence is located at:

- 3.4 km (2.1 mi) northwest of the village center of Saint-Étienne;
- 9.1 km (5.7 mi) northeast of the confluence of the Petit Saguenay River with the Saguenay River;
- 23.2 km (14.4 mi) west of Tadoussac.

== Toponymy ==
The toponym "rivière Saint-Athanase" (St. Athanase River) refers to St. Athanasius, a patron of the Roman Catholic Church.

The toponym "Saint-Athanase River" was formalized on December 5, 1968, at the Bank of place names of the Commission de toponymie du Quebec.

== See also ==
- Petit-Saguenay, a municipality
- Saguenay River, a watercourse
- List of rivers of Quebec
