= Lac au Sable (Mont-Élie) =

Body of water

- Location in Quebec
- Location: Mont-Élie
- Coordinates: 47.94222°N 70.25723°W
- Lake type: Natural
- Primary inflows: Petit Saguenay River, ruisseau Bazile, ruisseau au Sable
- Primary outflows: Petit Saguenay River
- Basin countries: Canada
- Max. length: 2.7 km (1.7 mi)
- Max. width: 1.4 km (0.87 mi)
- Surface elevation: 449 m (1,473 ft)

The Lac au Sable is a body of water crossed from south to north by the Petit Saguenay River, in the unorganized territory of Mont-Élie, in the Charlevoix-Est Regional County Municipality of the administrative region Capitale-Nationale, in Quebec, Canada.

The south-eastern part of "Lac au Sable" is served by the forest road R064. This road approaches to 0.6 km (0.37 mi) south of "Lac au Bouleau".

Forestry is the sector's main economic activity; recreotourism activities, second.

The surface of "Lac au Sable" is usually frozen from the end of November to the beginning of April, however safe circulation on the ice is generally done from mid-December to the end of March.

== Geography ==
The main watersheds neighboring "Lac au Sable" are:

- north side: lac au Bouleau, lac Emmuraillé, Petit Saguenay River;
- east side: McLagan lake, Étienne stream, Deschênes lake, Deschênes River, Noire river;
- south side: third Lac des Marais, Petit Saguenay River;
- west side: Sable stream, east lake, Grosse Épinette flow.

The "Lac au Sable" has a length of 2.7 km (1.7 mi). The Petit Saguenay River successively crosses "Lac au Sable" from south to north (length: 2.7 km (1.7 mi); altitude: 449 km (279 mi)), Lac au Bouleau (Mont-Élie) (length: 4.3 km (2.7 mi); altitude: 449 km (279 mi)) and the eastern part of Emmuraillé Lake (Sagard) (length:1.8 km (1.1 mi); altitude: 436 m (1,430 ft)).

The mouth of "Lac au Sable" is located at:

- 13.8 km (8.6 mi) south-west of lac Deschênes;
- 32.0 km (19.9 mi) south of the village center Petit-Saguenay;
- 32.9 km (20.4 mi) south of the confluence of the Petit Saguenay River and "Anse du Petit Saguenay Bay" located on the south shore of the Saguenay River.

From the mouth of "Lac au Sable", the current descends the Petit Saguenay River for 71.1 km (44.2 mi) north, northeast, then north to the south bank of the Saguenay River which the current then crosses on 36.6 km (22.7 mi) eastwards to Tadoussac where this last river flows into the Saint Lawrence River.

== Toponymy ==
The toponym "lac au Sable" was formalized on December 5, 1968, by the Commission de toponymie du Québec.

=== See also ===
- Emmuraillé Lake (Sagard)
