= Lac au Bouleau (Mont-Élie) =

Lake in Mont-Élie, Quebec, Canada

- Location in Quebec
- Location: Mont-Élie
- Coordinates: 47.97055°N 70.25361°W
- Lake type: Natural
- Primary inflows: Petit Saguenay River and outlet of Lac Armand
- Primary outflows: Petit Saguenay River
- Basin countries: Canada
- Max. length: 4.3 km (2.7 mi)
- Max. width: 0.9 km (0.56 mi)
- Surface elevation: 449 m (1,473 ft)

The Lac au Bouleau is a body of water crossed from south to north by the Petit Saguenay River, in the unorganized territory of Mont-Élie, in the Charlevoix-Est Regional County Municipality of the administrative region Capitale-Nationale, in Quebec, in Canada.

The south-eastern part of lac au Sable is served by the forest road R064. This road approaches to 0.6 km (0.37 mi) south of Lac au Bouleau.

Forestry is the sector's main economic activity; recreotourism activities, second.

The surface of Lac au Bouleau is usually frozen from the end of November to the beginning of April, however safe circulation on the ice is generally done from mid-December to the end of March.

== Geography ==
The main watersheds neighboring "Lac au Bouleau" are:

- north side: Emmuraillé Lake, Pilote Lake, Petit Saguenay River;
- east side: McLagan Lake, Étienne Brook, Deschênes Lake, Deschênes River;
- south side: Lac au Sable, ruisseau au Sable, Petit Saguenay River;
- west side: lac Bazile, coulée du Bazile.

Lac au Bouleau has a length of 4.3 km (2.7 mi) in the form of winter boots for women; the tip of the toes being the arrival of the current, while the current leaves from the north.

The Petit Saguenay river successively crosses Sable Lake from south to north (length: 2.7 km (1.7 mi); altitude: 449 km (279 mi)), Lac au Bouleau (length: 4.3 km (2.7 mi); altitude: 449 km (279 mi)) and the eastern part of Lac Emmuraillé (length: 1.8 km (1.1 mi); altitude: 436 km (271 mi)).

The mouth of Lac au Bouleau is located at:

- 10.4 km (6.5 mi) west of lac Deschênes;
- 28.4 km (17.6 mi) south of the village center Petit-Saguenay;
- 29.5 km (18.3 mi) south of the confluence of the Petit Saguenay river and Anse du Petit Saguenay located on the south shore of the Saguenay River.

From the mouth of "Lac au Bouleau", the current descends the Petit Saguenay River for 66.8 km (41.5 mi) to the northeast, then north to the south shore of the Saguenay river that the current crosses on 36.6 km (22.7 mi) eastwards to Tadoussac where this last river flows into the St. Lawrence River.

== Toponymy ==
Birch is a type of tree common in cold and temperate regions. This tree has white bark and small leaves. Its wood is often used in carpentry and cabinetmaking. It is also used in the manufacture of paper.

The toponym lac au Bouleau was formalized on December 5, 1968, by the Commission de toponymie du Québec.

=== See also ===
- Le Fjord-du-Saguenay Regional County Municipality
