= Saint-Étienne River =

- Location within Quebec
- Native name: Rivière Saint-Étienne (French)

Location
- Country: Canada
- Province: Quebec
- Region: Saguenay-Lac-Saint-Jean
- Regional County Municipality: Le Fjord-du-Saguenay Regional County Municipality
- Municipalities: Petit-Saguenay and Baie-Sainte-Catherine

Physical characteristics
- Source: Lake Ovila-Lavoie
  - location: Petit-Saguenay
  - coordinates: 48.17465°N 69.94485°W
  - elevation: 132 m (433 ft)
- Mouth: Saguenay River
  - location: Petit-Saguenay
  - coordinates: 48.20055°N 69.91472°W
  - elevation: 3 m (9.8 ft)
- Length: 4.8 km (3.0 mi)
- Discharge
  - location: Baie-Sainte-Catherine

Basin features
- Tributaries
  - left: Décharge du lac Fidelin.
  - right: Embranchement Gagnon.

The Saint-Étienne River is a tributary of the south shore of the Saguenay River flowing into the municipality of Petit-Saguenay in the Saguenay Fjord, Quebec, Canada. In the end, this river crosses the Saguenay Fjord National Park.

The Saint-Étienne River Valley is mainly served by Chemin Saint-Étienne and Chemin du Lac Fidelin.

Forestry is the first economic activity in the sector; recreational tourism activities, second.

The surface of the Saint-Étienne River is usually frozen from the beginning of December to the end of March, however, safe ice circulation is generally from mid-December to mid-March.

== Geography ==
The main hydrographic slopes near the Saint-Étienne River are:

- North side: Saguenay River;
- East side: Petites Îles River, St. Lawrence River;
- South side: Petit Saguenay River;
- West side: Petit Saguenay River, Cabanage River.

The Saint-Étienne River rises at the mouth of Lac des Côtes (length: 0.6 km (0.37 mi); altitude: 132 m (433 ft)). This source is located at: 3.8 km (2.4 mi) south of its mouth (confluence with the Saguenay River); 7.4 km (4.6 mi) northeast of a curve of the Petit Saguenay River; 18.0 km (11.2 mi) west of the mouth of the Saguenay River; 10.2 km (6.3 mi) south-east of the village center of Petit-Saguenay.

From its source (Lac des Côtes), the course of the Saint-Étienne River descends on 4.8 km (3.0 mi) according to the following segments: 2.9 km (1.8 mi) northerly in a confined valley to the outlet (from the southeast) of an unidentified lake; 1.5 km (0.93 mi) northerly in a concealed valley to the outlet (coming from the west) of Lac Fidelin; 0.4 km (0.25 mi) blaster in a valley through Saguenay Fjord National Park to its mouth.

The mouth of the Saint-Étienne River flows into the bottom of Anse Saint-Étienne on the south shore of the Saguenay River. This confluence is located at:

- 3.6 km (2.2 mi) north-east of the village center of Saint-Étienne;
- 14.4 km (8.9 mi) east of the confluence of the Petit Saguenay River with the Saguenay River;
- 17.0 km (10.6 mi) west of Tadoussac.

== Toponymy ==
The toponym "Saint-Étienne River" refers to St. Stephen (French: Saint-Étienne), a patron of the Roman Catholic Church.

The toponym "Saint-Étienne River" was formalized on December 5, 1968, at the Bank of Place Names of the Commission de toponymie du Québec.

== See also ==
- Petit-Saguenay, a municipality
- Saguenay Fjord National Park
- Saguenay River, a watercourse
- List of rivers of Quebec
