= Saguenay–St. Lawrence Marine Park =

National marine conservation area in Quebec, Canada

- French: Parc marin du Saguenay–Saint-Laurent
- IUCN category II (national park)
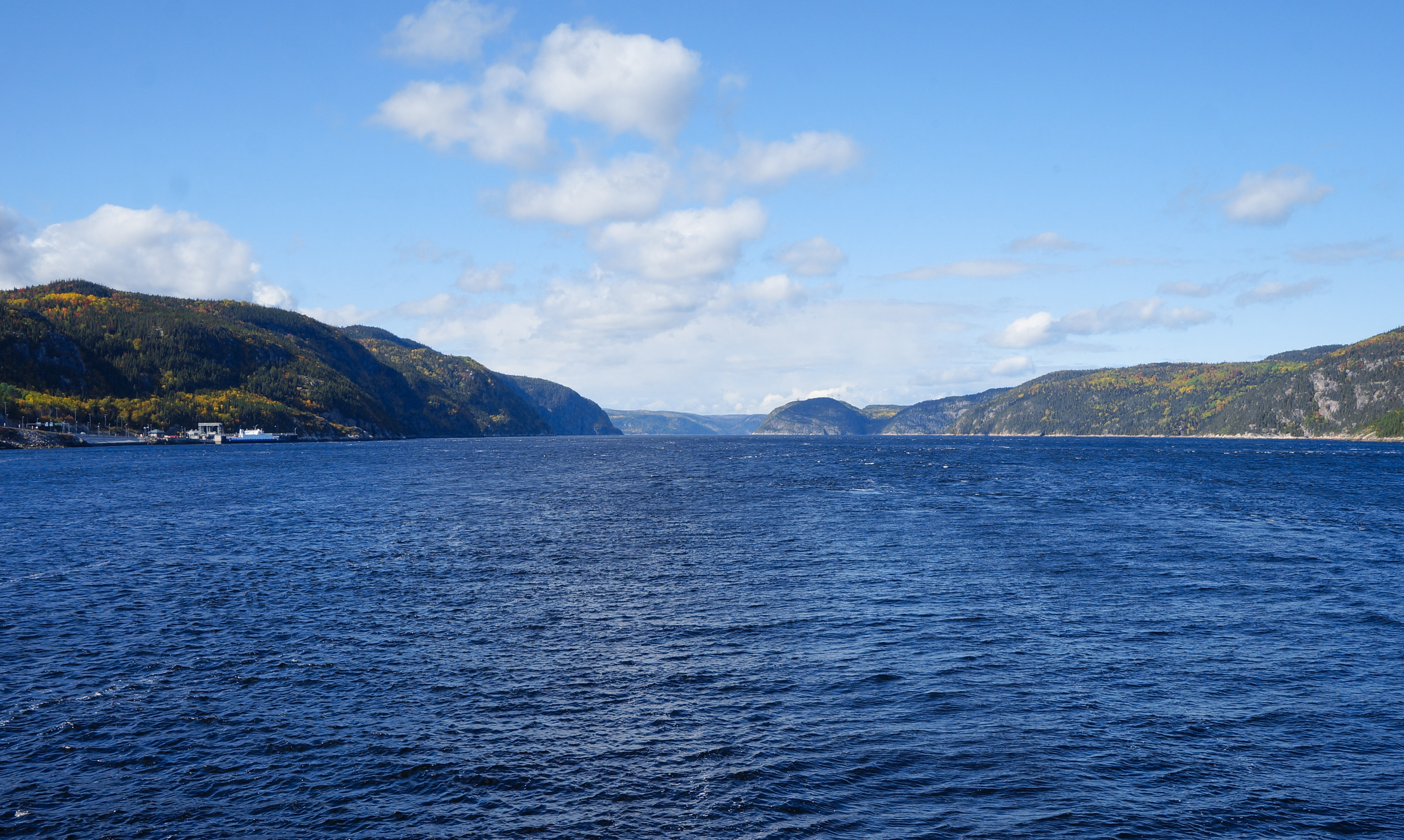
- Mouth of the Saguenay River

- Location within Canada Location within Quebec
- Interactive map of Saguenay–St. Lawrence Marine Park
- Location: Baie-Sainte-Catherine, Charlevoix-Est Regional County Municipality / Sacré-Coeur, and Tadoussac, La Haute-Côte-Nord Regional County Municipality, Quebec, Canada
- Nearest city: La Baie, Tadoussac
- Coordinates: 48°04′11″N 69°39′41″W
- Area: 1,246 km^{2} (481 sq mi)
- Established: 8 June 1998
- Visitors: 1,070,634 (in 2022-2023)
- Governing body: Parks Canada, Sépaq

The Saguenay–St. Lawrence Marine Park is a National Marine Conservation Area, one of three in the Canadian national park system, located where the Saguenay River meets the maritime estuary of the St. Lawrence River. This park is jointly managed by Parks Canada (Government of Canada) and Sépaq (Government of Quebec). It is the first park in all of Canada to protect a purely marine environment, and covers a surface area of 1,245 km^{2}. The area that is now the Saguenay–St. Lawrence Marine Park is a part of the Innue Essipit First Nation's land claim, and a treaty resulting from this claim could impact activities that are practiced within the park. The region surrounding the park is an important part of the history of Canada, being one of the first points of contact between Indigenous Peoples and European explorers and the birthplace of the intercontinental fur trade.

The Maritime estuary of St. Lawrence begin at the Saguenay Fjord this meeting form a distinct ecosystem for the species in the park. Different species of whales in particular are drawn to the rich food supply stirred up by the mixing of these waters. One of these species is the St. Lawrence Beluga whale, which is endemic to Canada and a species at risk. The most popular activity in the park is whale-watching. The park provides a variety of opportunities on and off the water for visitors to see them. There are several human impacts that threaten the park such as climate change, noise pollution, chemical pollution, and overfishing, many of which are not fully understood.

== History ==
The Saguenay-Lac-St-Jean region and surrounding areas are home to a rich and important part of Canadian history. The land has long hosted an abundance of natural resources such as fish, game, and berries, that played a large role in the survival of nomadic populations for generations. The region was occupied for at least 8,000 years prior to European contact. Findings from many archeological sites confirm the ancient peoples' seal hunting activities, and there is evidence that the Indigenous peoples of the region were a part of a network that extended from the Great Lakes to the Atlantic Coast. Over the centuries, subsistence activities and trade evolved. The region became a crossroad for trade between the Indigenous peoples of the region and European explorers when their fur trade was woven into the existing Indigenous trade network in the 16th century through the establishment of the first settler trading post in 1600 by Pierre de Chauvin. Trade between the Indigenous peoples of the region and Basque fisherman can be traced back as early as 1580. The Basque were the first Europeans to work in the St. Lawrence Estuary. An alliance between the French and the Indigenous peoples in and around Tadoussac was created in 1603 led by Samuel de Champlain. This agreement led to the establishment of Québec City in 1608.

Marine Park Saguenay Fjord National Park Marine Park co-ordination area

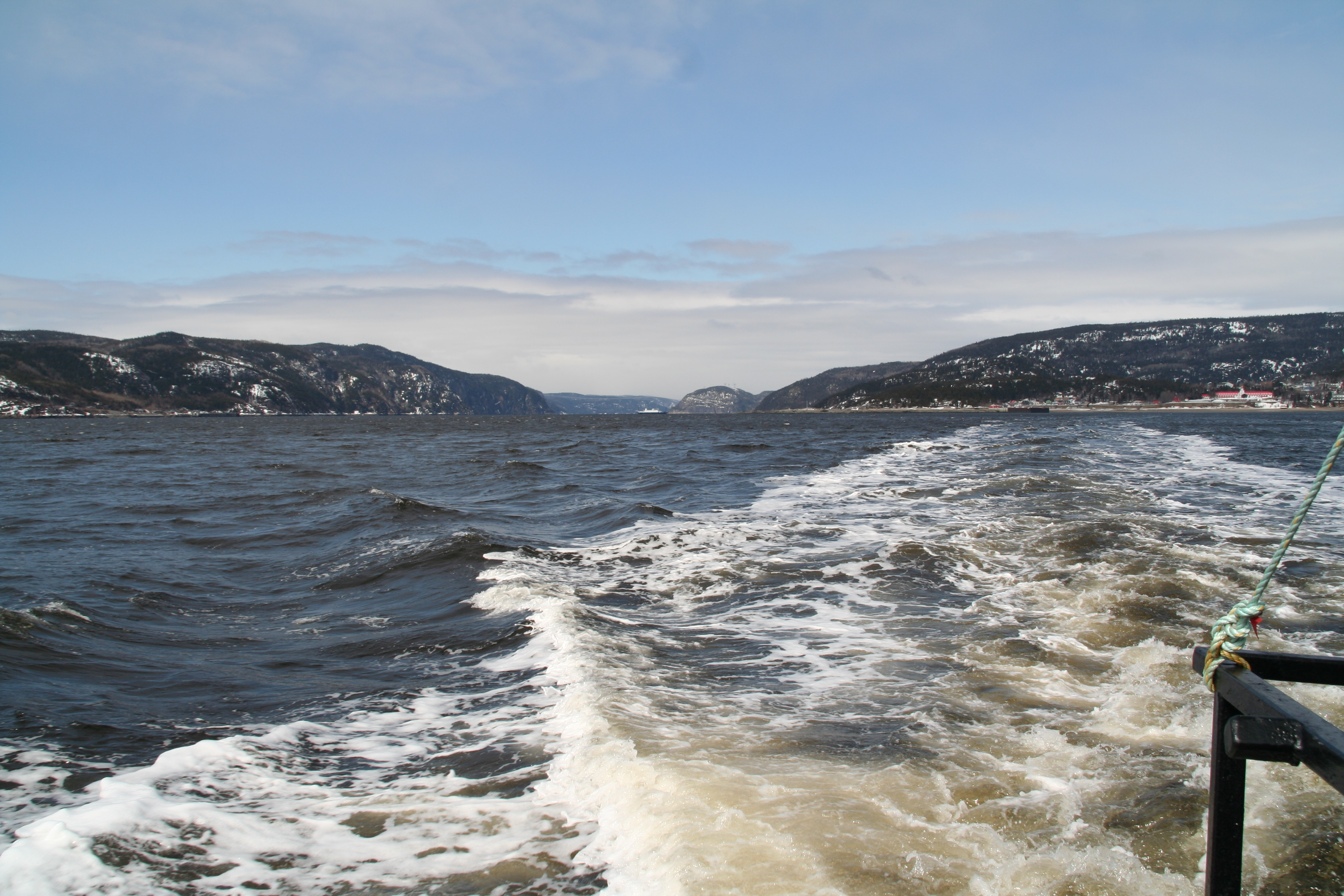
Saguenay–St. Lawrence Marine Park, Maritime estuary of St. Lawrence River, Tadoussac

In the 17th to the 19th century, Indigenous peoples relied on marine wildlife for subsistence, fishing for salmon and hunting seals and seabirds. They traded their furs and oils made from sea mammal fat at the trading post in Tadoussac, located at the mouth of the Saguenay River. The establishment of beluga fisheries began in 1701, until 1979 when beluga hunting was banned.

In the 19th century, demand for fish rose due to a boom in the forestry industry that led to a rapid increase in the French Canadian population as more sawmills were built. As the population increased, the land was transformed in order to house the new residents, impacting the nature and Indigenous peoples who had relied on this land to support them for centuries. The Innu saw a drastic decline in the hunting and fishing grounds which raised the first notions for land to be set aside for them in the form of reserves. The first conflicts between marine environmental users, as well as concerns for the preservation of those marine environments were raised. As the French continued to colonize the land, the region became a popular place for vacationing and sport fishing. In 1864 the first hotel was established in Québec City, setting the stage for the tourism industry in the Saguenay region. This was supported by progress in steam navigation that led to the rapid expansion of the region's tourism industry. Vacationers raised concerns for the impact that industry had had on the wildlife and landscape, leading to the first legislation to preserve salmon habitats in 1860.

In the 20th century Saguenay entered the industrial era, rapidly expanding their forestry industry to include pulp and paper plants, as well as developing into the hydroelectric and aluminum industries. This industrialization led to the urbanization and modernization of the region, expanding upstream. The rising concern for the environment near the end of the 20th century led to a revival of the tourism industry with a new focus on nature and cultural heritage, and eventually the creation of the Saguenay–St. Lawrence Marine Park. Ecotourism remains one of the most important economic activities in the region to this day, generation lots of economic benefits for surrounding communities.

== Ecology ==
=== Wildlife ===
The Saguenay–St. Lawrence Marine Park provides habitat for a high diversity of species. According to the Saguenay–St. Lawrence Marine Park Management Plan (2010), over 1,000 species of flora and fauna have been estimated to live there. The St. Lawrence Beluga whale and the harbour seal are the two marine mammal species that are residents of the park year-round. Other species that migrate to the marine park during different seasons are the blue whale, minke whale, fin whale, humpback whale, killer whale, long-finned pilot whale, northern bottlenose whale, sperm whale, North Atlantic right whale, white-beaked dolphin, Atlantic white-sided dolphin, harbour porpoise, harbour seal, and the grey seal. High krill and capelin concentrations make the Saguenay–St. Lawrence Marine Park an essential feeding site for several of these species. Zooplankton is also abundant in this area. Additionally, the islands of the estuary are recognized as crucial locations for various bird species to nest. Aside from whales, seals, and birds, the marine park contains several hundred varieties of benthic and pelagic organisms, including numerous species of algae. The marine park also provides ideal habitat for food, rest, and wintering of several bird species.

=== Species at risk ===
There are 13 species deemed at risk by the Committee on the Status of Endangered Wildlife in Canada (COSEWIC) that live in the Saguenay–St. Lawrence Marine Park or migrate there seasonally. One of these species, the St. Lawrence beluga whale (Delphinapterus leucas) was designated as endangered in 1983 by COSEWIC. The St. Lawrence beluga whale status was then changed to threatened in 1997. However, in 2014, the designation was re-examined and changed back to endangered. Up until the early 2000s, the population was growing at a rate of 0.13% each year. Since then, the population has been decreasing at around a rate of 1% each year. This beluga population is currently approximately 900 individuals, and is endemic to Canada. Additionally, this population is geographically and reproductively isolated from other populations because it is at the southernmost end of the species' range. The St. Lawrence beluga population faces various threats, including underwater noise, habitat degradation, and pollution. The population has demonstrated evidence of significant demographic shifts since the middle of the 2000s, including an increase in neonatal deaths and a decrease in the number of young individuals in the population. Other at-risk species include the fin whale, the blue whale, harbour porpoise, the North Atlantic right whale, and the Barrow's goldeneye.

=== Ecosystem ===
The Saguenay-St.Lawrence Marine Park contains three distinct ecosystems, including the upper estuary, lower estuary, and the Saguenay-Fjord. Each is hard to define by strict boundaries due to the nature of water, but it is the unique combination of all three that allows the park to support a large range of biodiversity. While each ecosystem differs in its temperature, salinity, sea floor, and depth, there are some processes that occur across the entire marine park. Most significantly, the continuous upwelling of cold water throughout this ecosystem bring fresh nutrients to the surface. The uneven underwater topography also supports producers, creating a strong ecological foundation for the park.

==== Upper and Lower Estuary ====
The Upper Estuary takes up the most area of the park, making up approximately 53%. It is characterized by wide flats, islands, and strong tides. It is the shallowest and warmest region, and has a rough sea floor. The water is high salinity-wise, but good circulation in this area mixes it well with freshwater. Despite the Upper Estuary being over 50% of the park, it has not been well-researched. The park management plan states the present data only indicate that the area supports species reproduction. The lower estuary accounts for 30% of the marine park. It is composed of saltwater from the Laurentian Channel, and is much deeper than the Upper Estuary. Considered a 'stable' region, marine life is plentiful despite contaminants from upstream. It also serves the Saguenay Fjord with oxygen-rich water.

==== Saguenay Fjord ====
The Saguenay Fjord is the final 17% of the marine park. It is over 105 kilometres (65 mi) long and 275 metres (902 ft) deep. Mammals such as whales frequent the region due to its depth and supply of nutrients. Despite the fjord being rich in nutrients, it is the least stable region, with its health considered unstable. Fish populations have been declining, which is one indicator of the fjord's poor health. Historically, major contaminants such as mercury and lead have been a problem for the fjord, but these have been greatly reduced. Organic contaminants such as organochlorines are bigger threats to current marine life.

== Saguenay-St. Lawrence Marine Park management plan ==
On April 6, 1990, the governments of Quebec and Canada signed an agreement to create the Saguenay–St. Lawrence Marine Park. The management plan was originally drafted in 1995, and the park was officially created in 1998. This was the first time that Quebec and Canada worked together to create a marine protected area (MPA). Saguenay–St. Lawrence Marine Park was the first park in Canada to be dedicated to preserving a marine environment. The Saguenay-St Lawrence Marine Park is the product of years of coordinated conservation efforts between the two governments and is part of a larger endeavour to protect Canada's marine environment. There was no transfer of land, so each government continues to act within the scope of their jurisdictions within the park. The park was created to increase the level of protection of a representative portion of the ecosystems present in the Saguenay River and St. Lawrence estuary. This was done with the goal of benefitting the present and future generations, for conservation purposes and to encourage its use for education, science and recreation. Two rounds of public consultations were conducted in order to determine the boundaries of the park and to present the management plan.

Management of the park is done following the principles of environmentally sustainable use, where ecosystems are used according to their limits regarding providing ecosystem services and resources. This ecosystem-based management method takes into account the renewal rates of marine resources. As well, protects endangered populations and habitats and aims to reduce the impact that human activities have on the operation of ecosystems.

The management plan was revisited in 2010 and a new document was produced. The revised management plan describes issues and objectives that guide new strategies to be implemented concerning the following: participatory management, ecosystem biodiversity, environmental sustainability of resource use, visitor experience, public education, public awareness, and administration.

=== Management structure ===
The creation of this park involved the establishment of teams to develop management tools for public safety, resource conservation, and environmental emergencies. The harmonization management committee was created to help harmonize the management activities of the provincial and federal governments and ensure co-management between governments. The coordinating committee is made up of representatives from various government departments and organizations involved in managing the park. There are representatives from the governments of provincial, federal, and regional governments involved in managing the park. Along with the Montagnais Essipit Band Council, a conservation group, the scientific community, the education community and Parks Canada. The coordinating committee is tasked with ensuring that follows up on the management plan is done and to advise the Ministers responsible for the park on the strategies and methods needed to attain the objectives outlined in the plan. The management plan emphasized the importance of public consultation and participation, especially the participation of Indigenous peoples, is crucial to the park's success. The coordinating committee has created six different advising boards. Each committee provides their own focus to help define the challenges associated with different aspects of the coordinating committee's intervention framework. The Ecosystem Management and Research Advisory Committee are tasked with identifying the needs and priorities related to the collection of scientific knowledge and data in the park. The continued commitment of all parties involved in the management of the park is crucial to achieving the maintenance of biodiversity and management of both marine resources and human activities.

=== Management objectives regarding ecosystem, sustainable use and biodiversity conservation ===
The revised management plan (2010) lays out new visions and actions that need to be taken in order to further protect ecosystems and biodiversity in the park, as well as ensure ecologically sustainable use of resources. These include, but are not limited to;

- Protecting vulnerable populations and ecosystems by ensuring the restoration and improvement of habitats that are essential to their survival;
- Implementing environmental monitoring mechanisms to measure the evolution of the park's ecosystems and monitor the efficiency of management methods;
- Fostering the development of conservation values and awareness in those living around the park;
- Managing resource use following the principles of sustainable use and development (i.e. environmentally viable, socially acceptable and economically profitable);
- Promoting the collection of knowledge concerning ecosystem management approaches for commercial and recreational activities, and generating interest of research centers to conduct research on the natural and cultural heritage of the park.

==== Park use objectives ====
The goal of the park is to provide opportunities for visitors to enjoy a mostly undisturbed marine environment. Activities such as marine tours, cruises, scuba diving are allowed, and encouraged. Through partnerships with communities in the areas surrounding the park, tourism in the area has grown and many different recreational activities and services are available to visitors. This has benefitted the surrounding regions and has greatly contributed to the social, economic and cultural development and wellbeing of the local communities. There is no harvesting of natural resources permitted in the park, although large commercial ships are allowed to pass through. There is some recreational hunting and fishing activities permitted within the park, so long as they comply with the management principles of the park and within specified zones.

=== Participatory management and co-management with Indigenous peoples ===
The Saguenay-St. Lawrence Marine Protected Area and surrounding areas are part of the traditional territories of the Innu Essipit First Nation, the Pessamit Innu Band, and the Maliseet of Viger First Nation. The area that is now the Saguenay–St. Lawrence Marine Park is a part of the Essipit Innu First Nation's traditional territory, and a treaty resulting from their land claim could impact activities that are practiced within the park. The coordination zone of the park includes land claimed by the Malecite First Nation in Viger. The heritage presentations in the park take into consideration the activities, interests, and experiences of the Indigenous communities within the coordination zone. The Essipit Innu First Nation has been involved from the beginning and have played an essential role in all stages of the planning and implementation of the park. A representative from the Essipit Innu Band Council sits on the coordinating committee and other advisory boards. They contribute significantly to the presentation of the park, attesting to the long-established presence of Indigenous peoples in the area, as well as promoting the ancestral and contemporary cultural significance. Additionally, any projects that are considered by the committee that may have an impact on any Indigenous Communities, will first go through the process of informing the communities.

== Human impacts ==
=== Climate change impacts ===
Sea ice is vital to certain species' habitats in the marine park, particularly marine mammals. One major concern of the park is that the rising temperatures as a result of climate change are correlated with sea ice melt. Sea ice conditions were monitored from 1994 to 2008 in a study examining the entire St.Lawrence ecosystem, which includes the marine park. When compared to data from the 1980s and 1990s, sea ice had been significantly reduced. As a result, the low ice conditions reduced the availability of habitats and marine mammal stranding occurred more as more ice melted. The effect on marine productivity was also negative.

=== Noise pollution ===
The area once served as a refuge for whales from low frequency noise. Shipping noise and other water traffic are detrimental to the endangered whale population. As traffic in the Saguenay St. Lawrence Marine Park increases, there is a worry about the effects this could have on whales. Beluga whales are a central part of tourism in the park, and it has been known as one of the best locations to go whale watching. It has been observed that the negative effects associated with increased noise have the greatest impact on calves and females. This is worrying as calves and females are extremely important to the persistence of this endangered species. Investigations into this problem are still in the early stages, however, there is an understanding that harm is being done. Political action to address this is still relatively uncertain, and the conflict between the transportation sector and conservationists adds complexity. Parks Canada does have stated goals to address this, but the future of this issue is once again uncertain.

=== Pollution ===
Human pollution is a risk for species that live within the Saguenay St. Lawrence Marine Park. Shorelines of surrounding rivers lack industrial, agricultural, or even urban development which aids the health of this region. However, due to many river systems affecting this area, less direct influences of urban development have been found to significantly impact the park. Waste treatment is unsatisfactory, leading to untreated human waste being found in the water along with high levels of suspended particles due to how water enters the system. Industrial pollution, while less impactful, also has an effect. Fertilizer leaching into the water, and river seeing extensive use for transportation has led to pollutants entering the water, however the weight of these findings are less understood than that of urban development.

Clams have been affected negatively by chemical pollution such as fuel combustion, oil contamination, and urban pollution, which has led to a multitude of negative side effects. These side effects occur in areas of neuroendocrine, DNA damage, immunocompetence and increased energy expenses. This not only harms the clams, but also species that feed upon them, such as the beluga whale. Ragworm Nereis diversicolor, gammarids, fish, birds, are impacted as well as others through bioaccumulation. The true scope of this issue is currently not known, but there is a high potential risk.

=== Overfishing ===
There is minimal knowledge of commercial and recreational fishing in Saguenay St. Lawrence Marine Park despite its long history of fishing use. However, fishing is still thought to be a point of concern by Parks Canada. The true fish population and catch rates are unknown, which make quantifying this issue difficult. Even without clear data, there has been warning signs that imply that the population may be declining. Catch rates while ice fishing have been noted to be falling, as well as a general yearly population decline. There is a push to acquire more data, but it will be seen when this will happen, or if it will be successful in managing the fish community.

== Tourism ==
The Saguenay–St. Lawrence Marine Park has attracted 1,070,634 visitors during the season 2022 to 2023. There are many opportunities for visitors, with the most popular activity being whale watching. While belugas live in the park year-round, they are best spotted between May and October. Visitors can be right on the water through cruises, sea kayaking, boating, or scuba diving. Beyond this, there are four tourist regions that offer other attractions forming a "Discovery Network" along the coast of the park. These regions are Bas-Saint-Laurent, Charlevoix, Côte-Nord, and Saguenay–Lac-Saint-Jean. Common tourist attractions such as museums, hiking, and more opportunities for whale-watching are available. As a protected park, the aim is to minimize human impacts. The 'Marine Activities in the Saguenay-St.Lawrence Marine Park' outlines all of the regulations surrounding watercraft and personal activities in the park.

== See also ==
- Île aux Lièvres (Saint Lawrence River)
- List of Quebec national parks
- List of national parks of Canada
- Saguenay, Québec
