= Petit Saguenay River =

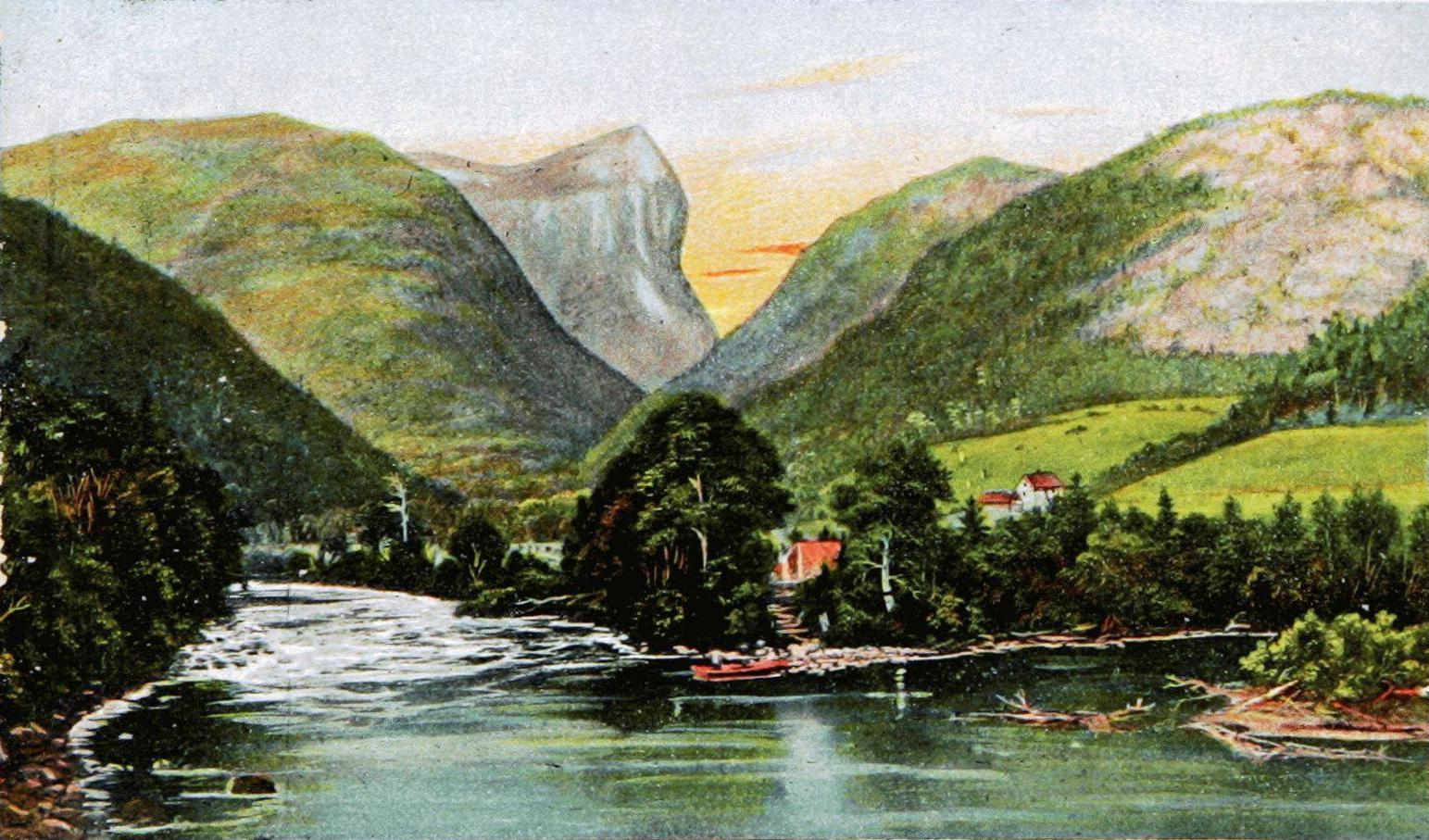

- Location within Quebec

Location
- Country: Canada
- Province: Quebec
- Region: Capitale-Nationale and Saguenay-Lac-Saint-Jean
- Regional County Municipality: Charlevoix-Est Regional County Municipality and Le Fjord-du-Saguenay Regional County Municipality
- Municipalities: Sagard and Petit-Saguenay

Physical characteristics
- Source: Troisième lac des Marais
  - location: Sagard
  - coordinates: 47.879379°N 70.249355°W
  - elevation: 608 m (1,995 ft)
- Mouth: Saguenay River
  - location: Petit-Saguenay
  - coordinates: 48.23444°N 70.10028°W
  - elevation: 3 m (9.8 ft)
- Length: 84.8 km (52.7 mi)
- Discharge
  - location: Petit-Saguenay

Basin features
- Tributaries
  - left: (from the mouth) Outlet of Lac du Camp, outlet of lac des Feuilles, Cabanage River, Portage River (Petit-Saguenay River tributary), ruisseau Dallaire, ruisseau à l'Eau Froide, outlet of lac Brossard, outlet of lac Cast, outlet of lac Germaine, outlet of a set of lakes such Mailloux, Crochu, "de la Gosse" and à Ti-Jos, outlet of lac Aimé and "des Harvey", outlet of "Lac à Jacinthe" (via "lac Emmuraillé"), ruisseau Pilote (via le lac Pilote et Emmuraillé), lac Armand (via "Lac au Bouleau"), ruisseau Bazile (via "Lac au Sable"), ruisseau au Sable (via "Lac au Sable"), outlet of Petit lac au Sable, outlet of Lac Pierrot.
  - right: (from the mouth) Outlet of Lac à Léon, cours d'eau Simard, outlet of lac Tom, outlet of Lac de l'Oeuf, outlet of Lac à David et du lac Luc, rivière Deschênes, outlet of lacs Croche, Noir and "à la Bombe", outlet of lac du Chicot and lac Onésime, outlet of Lac des Abeilles (via le Lac au Sable).

The Petit Saguenay River is a watercourse flowing in Quebec, Canada, in:

- the unorganized territory of Sagard, Charlevoix-Est Regional County Municipality, in administrative region of Capitale-Nationale;
- the municipality of Petit-Saguenay, in the Le Fjord-du-Saguenay Regional County Municipality, in the administrative region of Saguenay-Lac-Saint-Jean.

This river has the status of "salmon river"; the course of the river is administered by the zec de la Rivière-Petit-Saguenay which supervises 24 salmon pits and a non-quota zone. A lower segment (near the Saguenay River) is administered by the Saguenay Fjord National Park and the zec de l'Anse-Saint-Jean.

The lower part of this river is served by Quai Street (West Bank) from the mouth, rue Tremblay and rue Eugène-Morin. The route 170 passes on the east bank between the village of Petit-Saguenay and the confluence of the Deschênes River. The intermediate section is served by Lac Victor Road and Ovila-Lavoie Road. The upper part is served by various secondary forest roads.

Forestry is the first economic activity in the sector; recreational tourism activities, second.

The surface of the Petit Saguenay River is usually frozen from the beginning of December to the end of March, however, safe ice circulation is generally from mid-December to mid-March.

== Hydrology ==
With 88.4 km (54.9 mi) long, the "Petit Saguenay River" drains a watershed of 789.94 km (490.85 mi) including 441 km (274.02 mi) for the basin upstream of the "Petit Saguenay" water measurement station located 1 km downstream of the confluence with the outlet of David Lake. At this measuring station, the average flow of the river reaches 16 m (52.493 ft).

The Petit Saguenay River is a river of white water, with a bed of pebbles, gravel and sand.

== Geography ==
The main hydrographic slopes near the Petit Saguenay River are:

- North side: Saguenay River;
- East side: rivière de la Baie des Rochers, Saint-Athanase River, Saint-Étienne River;
- South side: Noire River, Deschênes River;
- West side: Rivière du Portage, Saint-Jean River.

The Petit Saguenay River has its source in the "Troisième lac des Marais" (Third Marsh Lake) (length: 1.9 km (1.2 mi); altitude: 608 m (1,995 ft)) of various bodies of water in the zec du Lac-au-Sable, then flows east to Sagard. From its source ("Troisième lac des Marais"), the course of the Petit Saguenay River descends on 84.8 km (52.7 mi) according to the following segments:

Upper course of the Petit Saguenay River (segment of 20.0 km (12.4 mi))

- 5.3 km (3.3 mi) to the north by collecting the Pierrot Lake discharge (coming from the southwest), to the outlet (coming from the west) of "Petit lac au Sable";
- 3.9 km (2.4 mi) northwesterly, forming a hook to the east, to the east shore of Lac au Sable;
- 2.7 km (1.7 mi) north across the Lac au Sable (elevation: 449 m (1,473 ft)) along its full length to its mouth. Note: this lake receives, on the west bank, Bazile Brook and Sable Creek;
- 4.3 km (2.7 mi) north across Lac au Bouleau (Birtch Lake) (length: 4.3 km (2.7 mi); altitude: 449 m (1,473 ft)) on its full length to its mouth;
- 2.0 km (1.2 mi) northerly, westerly to the east bank, then north across the Emmuraillé Lake (length: 1.8 km (1.1 mi) altitude: 436 m (1,430 ft)) on 0.6 km (0.37 mi) to its mouth;

Upper course of the Petit Saguenay River, downstream from Lake Emmuraillé (segment of 18.7 km (11.6 mi))

- 2.6 km (1.6 mi) northerly, forming a large loop to the east and then to the northeast, including crossing Petit Saguenay Lake (length: 0.9 km (0.56 mi); altitude: 382 m (1,253 ft)) on its full length to its mouth;
- 1.8 km (1.1 mi) to the northwest by collecting the discharge (coming from the north) of an unidentified lake, to the dump (coming from the south-east) of Lake Chicot, the lake Onesime and McLagan Lake;
- 3.8 km (2.4 mi) northerly in a valley sometimes enclosed, to the outlet (coming from the west) of Lake Ti-Jos;
- 2.3 km (1.4 mi) east, then north, to a river bend;
- 8.2 km (5.1 mi) easterly forming a long curve to the south, collecting the outlet of Pichetoune Lake and the outlet of Beaver Lake, until the confluence of the Deschênes River (from the south);

Intermediate course of the Petit Saguenay River (segment of 19.4 km (12.1 mi))

- 2.3 km (1.4 mi) northerly passing through the village of Sagard, to the outlet (coming from the west) of an unidentified lake;
- 9.3 km (5.8 mi) northerly along the west side of route 170 and winding through a few marsh areas to the dump (coming from West) of Red Pine Lake;
- 2.2 km (1.4 mi) to the east forming a large S in marsh area, to the outlet (from the east) of Lake David;
- 5.6 km (3.5 mi) north, crossing four sets of rapids, to a river bend corresponding to the dump (coming from the southeast) of Lac de l'Oeuf;

Lower course of the Petit Saguenay River (segment of 26.7 km (16.6 mi))

- 7.2 km (4.5 mi) southwesterly, first northwesterly to form a large misshapen loop, then south to a marsh zone, to a bend in the river;
- 3.8 km (2.4 mi) northwesterly, collecting the Cold Water Creek and forming large streamers in the marsh zone, to Dallaire Creek (coming from the southwest);
- 3.2 km (2.0 mi) northerly crossing a swamp area, to the outlet of Tom Lake (coming from the east);
- 3.3 km (2.1 mi) northwesterly, distancing itself to 1.0 km (0.62 mi) west of route 170 to the west at the confluence of the Portage River (coming from the southwest);
- 1.0 km (0.62 mi) northerly in a steep valley, to a bend in the river corresponding to a creek (coming from the east);
- 5.4 km (3.4 mi) northwesterly, forming a hook to the southeast and along the southwestern side of Highway 170, to the center of the village of Petit-Saguenay;
- 2.8 km (1.7 mi) northwesterly in a straight line to its mouth.

Note: Between Sagard and Petit-Saguenay, the Petit Saguenay River is bordered by route 170.

The mouth of the Petit Saguenay River flows into a narrow bay on the south shore of the Saguenay River, partially closed by a jetty. This berry provides protection from boating in the event of a windstorm. This confluence is located at:

- 7.9 km (4.9 mi) north-east of the village center of L'Anse-Saint-Jean;
- 2.4 km (1.5 mi) northwest of the village center of Petit-Saguenay;
- 30.1 km (18.7 mi) west of Tadoussac.

== History ==
The name of the river was mentioned by James McKenzie in the legislature of Lower Canada in 1824. The occupation of the region dates back to the late 1830s. In 1842, a sawmill was built near the mouth of the Petit Saguenay River. William Price (1789-1867) bought it in 1844 and established a model farm there which also became the headquarters of his activities in the area. As a result, river salmon became scarce due to the presence of sawmills and overfishing.

The fire of Mr. Price's sawmill in 1870 resulted in the displacement of upstream dwellings on the present site of the village of Petit-Saguenay.

== Fishing ==
Salmon fishing rights in the Petit Saguenay River were first held by William Price. At the end of the 19th century, they passed into the hands of several rich English speakers, before being granted to clubs and associations. In 1950, a group of Americans acquired land bordering the river, upstream of the village, and built fishing lodges. This complex (land and construction), known as the "Gentlemen's Club", is now managed under the name of "Petit-Saguenay River Site".

Since 1999, the territory has been established in controlled harvesting zone (zec) and the "Petit-Saguenay River Association" has been managing Atlantic salmon sport fishing since 1966. The organization is recognized for its role in the sustainable development of salmon resources by being the founder of the Atlantic Salmon Protective Charter.

Thirteen of the 88.4 kilometers are open to salmon fishing, including one on the Portage River, a tributary of Petit-Saguenay. For the salmon fishery, the river has 24 pits in 1 open access area and 2 restricted access areas.

== Toponymy ==
The name "Petit Saguenay River" was originally mentioned in 1824 by James McKenzie, at the House of Assembly of Lower Canada who wanted to know more about this sector. McKenzie then refers to the "Little River named Petit Saguenay on which we also take salmon." Surveyor William Tremblay, in his report on the canton of Saint-Jean, in 1893, mentions the "Petit Saguenay River" to identify this watercourse.

In Quebec toponymy, we often find duplicates in diminutive of the main watercourse (ex.: "Saguenay river" versus "Petit Saguenay river").

The toponym "Petit Saguenay River" was formalized on December 5, 1968, at the Bank of Place Names of the Commission de toponymie du Québec.

== Annexes ==
=== Related Articles ===
- Le Fjord-du-Saguenay Regional County Municipality
- Petit-Saguenay, a municipality
- Portage River
- Cabanage River
- Deschênes River
- Sagard, an TNO
- Zec du Lac-au-Sable, a controlled harvesting zone
- Zec de la Rivière-Petit-Saguenay, a controlled harvesting zone
- Zec de l'Anse-Saint-Jean, a controlled harvesting zone
- Saguenay Fjord National Park
- List of rivers of Quebec
