= Cabanage River =

River in Quebec, Canada

Cabanaga River
- Location within Quebec
- Native name: Rivière du Cabanage (French)

Location
- Country: Canada
- Province: Quebec
- Region: Saguenay-Lac-Saint-Jean
- Regional County Municipality: Le Fjord-du-Saguenay Regional County Municipality
- Municipalities: Petit-Saguenay

Physical characteristics
- Source: Lac de la Muraille
  - location: Petit-Saguenay
  - coordinates: 48.18852°N 70.01503°W
  - elevation: 503 m (1,650 ft)
- Mouth: Saguenay River
  - location: Petit-Saguenay
  - coordinates: 48.18852°N 70.01503°W
  - elevation: 20 m (66 ft)
- Length: 15.8 km (9.8 mi)
- Discharge
  - location: Petit-Saguenay

Basin features
- Tributaries
  - left: (from the mouth) Discharge of "Lac des Collets".
  - right: (from the mouth) Discharge of 2 lakes such as "Lac Fourchu".

The Cabanage River (French: Rivière du Cabanage) is a tributary of the south shore of the Petit Saguenay River flowing in the municipality of Petit-Saguenay, in the Le Fjord-du-Saguenay Regional County Municipality, in administrative region of Saguenay-Lac-Saint-Jean, Quebec, Canada.

The valley of the Cabanage River is served mainly by Quai Street for the lower part, by route 170 for the intermediate part and by the Lavoie Road for the upper part.

Forestry is the first economic activity in the sector; recreational tourism activities, second.

The surface of the Cabanage River is usually frozen from the beginning of December to the end of March, however; safe ice circulation is generally from mid-December to mid-March.

== Geography ==
The main hydrographic slopes near the Cabanage River are:

- North side: Petit Saguenay River, Saguenay River;
- East side: Petit Saguenay River, Saint-Athanase River, Saint-Étienne River;
- South side: Saint Jean River.

The river Cabanage has its source at the mouth of the "lac de la Muraille" (lake of the Wall) (length: 1.0 km (0.62 mi); altitude: 503 m (1,650 ft)). This source is located at:

- 9.8 km (6.1 mi) south of its mouth (confluence with the Petit Saguenay River);
- 9.1 km (5.7 mi) south of the Saguenay River;
- 10.0 km (6.2 mi) southwest of the mouth of the Petit Saguenay River;
- 7.8 km (4.8 mi) south-east of the village center of L'Anse-Saint-Jean.

From its source ("Lac de la Muraille"), the course of the river Cabanage descends on 15.8 km (9.8 mi) according to the following segments:

- 1.7 km (1.1 mi) northeasterly in a straight line in a steep valley to the outlet (from the southeast) of a few lakes including Lake Fourchu;
- 2.1 km (1.3 mi) northeasterly in a straight line in a steep valley to the outlet (coming from the north-west) of Lac des Collets;
- 2.8 km (1.7 mi) northeasterly across Long Lake (on 1.0 km (0.62 mi)), then forming a curve to the north, to a discharge (from northeast) of several small lakes;
- 3.2 km (2.0 mi) northeasterly in a steep valley, to the outlet of a lake (coming from the northwest);
- 2.8 km (1.7 mi) northeasterly, winding on the south side of Highway 170 that intersects it at 2.0 km (1.2 mi) southwest of the village center of Petit-Saguenay;
- 3.2 km (2.0 mi) northeasterly along part of route 170, then winding to its mouth.

The mouth of the Cabanage River empties into the bottom of the "Anse au Cheval" on the south bank of the Saguenay River. This confluence is located at:

- 9.3 km (5.8 mi) east of the village center of L'Anse-Saint-Jean;
- 0.7 km (0.43 mi) northwest of the village center of Petit-Saguenay;
- 1.8 km (1.1 mi) northeast of the confluence of the Petit Saguenay River with the Saguenay River;
- 29.5 km (18.3 mi) west of Tadoussac.

== History ==
According to the analysis of artifacts found along the Petit Saguenay River, the Aboriginal presence in this area dates back to at least 1000 BC. In the twentieth century, Amerindians and Métis frequented the valley of the Petit Saguenay River for hunting and fishing

During the first attempts at colonization at the mouth of the Petit Saguenay River, Métis families lived in this area. In 1844, the workers of the team who built the first mill at the mouth of this river, reported that the Métis Charles Bernier (husband of Osithe Landry) was part of the workers. Following the abandonment of the mill, this half-breed will be the first to settle with his family in the "Le Cabanage" area. This Amerindian and Métis presence was observed until the 1920s at Anse de Petit-Saguenay and in the Cabanage sector.

== Toponymy ==
The name "Cabanage river" is a derivative of the term Cabanagem which refers to a type of hut used by poor people mainly the half-breeds, freed slaves and indigenous peoples. The hamlet "Le Cabanage" is located at 4.8 km (3.0 mi) south-west of the village of Petit-Saguenay, along the course of the river Cabanage.

The toponym "Rivière du Cabanage" was officialized on December 5, 1968, at the Bank of Place Names of the Commission de toponymie du Québec.

== See also ==
- List of rivers of Quebec
