= Zec de l'Anse-Saint-Jean =

Zec Anse-Saint-Jean
- Location within Quebec
- Location: Canada, Le Fjord-du-Saguenay Regional County Municipality
- Nearest city: Saguenay, Quebecl, Canada
- Coordinates: 47°48′10″N 70°14′47″W
- Area: 193.5 square kilometres (74.7 sq mi)
- Established: 1979

The ZEC de l'Anse-Saint-Jean is a "zone d'exploitation contrôlée" (controlled harvesting area) (ZEC) of 193.5 square kilometres (74.7 sq mi), located in the municipality of L'Anse-Saint-Jean in Le Fjord-du-Saguenay Regional County Municipality, in the administrative region Saguenay-Lac-Saint-Jean, Quebec, Canada. The main economic activities of the area are forestry and tourist activities.

The Zec de la Rivière-Saint-Jean-du-Saguenay is managing segments of Saint-Jean River (Saguenay). While "Zec de l'Anse-Saint-Jean" administers public lands, mainly forested land surrounding the river.

== Geography ==
"Zec de l'Anse-Saint-Jean" is located at 70 kilometres (43 mi) north of Saint-Simeon and 80 kilometres (50 mi) (for the route 170) southeast of the city of Saguenay. The ZEC is adjacent on north side to the Zec du Lac-au-Sable. This forested area of 200 square kilometres (77 sq mi), include:

- three rivers, one of which is exploited for fishing, and
- 100 lakes, of which 35 are used for fishing.

The brook trout is very populous in the various water bodies in Zec.

== Toponymy ==
The names of the two controlled harvesting zone (zec) are related to the place name of the river, town and bay.

The name "Zec Anse-Saint-Jean" was recorded on August 5, 1982 at the Bank of place names in the Commission de toponymie du Québec (Geographical Names Board of Québec).

== See also ==
- L'Anse-Saint-Jean, a municipality
- Saguenay River
- Le Fjord-du-Saguenay Regional County Municipality
- Saguenay-Lac-Saint-Jean
- Parc national du Fjord-du-Saguenay
- Zone d'exploitation contrôlée (controlled harvesting zone) (ZEC)
