= Deschênes River =

- Location within Quebec
- Native name: Rivière Deschênes (French)

Location
- Country: Canada
- Province: Quebec
- Region: Capitale-Nationale
- Regional County Municipality: Charlevoix-Est Regional County Municipality
- Municipalities: Sagard

Physical characteristics
- Source: Deschênes Lake
  - location: Sagard
  - coordinates: 47.97411°N 70.06688°W
  - elevation: 224 m (735 ft)
- Mouth: Petit Saguenay River
  - location: Sagard
  - coordinates: 48.02167°N 70.06917°W
  - elevation: 207 m (679 ft)
- Length: 8.2 km (5.1 mi)
- Discharge
  - location: Sagard

Basin features
- Tributaries
  - left: (from the mouth) Outlet of Desbiens Lake, ruisseau Laurent

The Deschênes River is a tributary of the south shore of the Petit Saguenay River flowing into the unorganized territory of Sagard in the Charlevoix-Est Regional County Municipality, Quebec, Canada.

The valley of the Deschênes River is mainly served by route 170 along its entire route.

Forestry is the first economic activity in the sector; recreational tourism activities, second.

The surface of the Deschênes River is usually frozen from the beginning of December to the end of March, however, safe ice circulation is generally from mid-December to mid-March.

== Geography ==
The main hydrographic slopes adjacent to the Deschênes River are:

- North side: Petit Saguenay River, Saguenay River;
- East side: rivière de la Baie des Rochers, Noire River;
- South side: Noire River;
- West side: Petit Saguenay River.

The Deschênes River rises at the mouth of a Deschênes Lake (length: 3.5 km (2.2 mi); altitude: 224 m (735 ft)). This lake has an appendage stretching 0.5 km (0.31 mi) east. This appendix receives the waters of Lakes Clapin, Dédé and Gauthier. The resort is mainly developed on the southwestern shore, along route 170. Its mouth is located at the bottom of a bay on the north shore. The mouth of Lake Deschênes is located at:

- 5.3 km (3.3 mi) south-east of its mouth (confluence with the Petit Saguenay River);
- 28.5 km (17.7 mi) south-east of the Saguenay River (confluence of the Petit Saguenay River);
- 26.5 km (16.5 mi) south-east of the village center of Petit-Saguenay;
- 30.7 km (19.1 mi) south-east of the village center of L'Anse-Saint-Jean.

From its source (Deschênes Lake), the course of the Deschênes River descends on 8.2 km (5.1 mi) according to the following segments:

- 0.5 km (0.31 mi) northwesterly to Lawrence Creek (coming from the west);
- 7.7 km (4.8 mi) northerly meandering through a valley flared into the mountains to a bend in the Petit Saguenay River

The mouth of the Deschênes River flows into a river bend on the south shore of the Petit Saguenay River. This confluence is located at:

- 1.0 km (0.62 mi) south of the village center of Sagard;
- 25.8 km (16.0 mi) south-east of the village center of L'Anse-Saint-Jean;
- 21.2 km (13.2 mi) south-east of the center of the village of Petit-Saguenay;
- 23.2 km (14.4 mi) south-east of the confluence of the Petit Saguenay River with the Saguenay River;
- 29.3 km (18.2 mi) south-east of the mouth of the Saguenay River.

== Toponymy ==
The term "Deschênes" is a surname of French origin. This toponym is widespread in French America.

The toponym "Rivière Deschênes" was officialized on December 5, 1968, at the Bank of Place Names of the Commission de toponymie du Québec.

== See also ==
- Petit-Saguenay, a municipality
- Saguenay River, a watercourse
- Petit Saguenay River, a watercourse
- List of rivers of Quebec
