= Sacré-Coeur, Quebec =

Sacré-Cœur
- Municipality
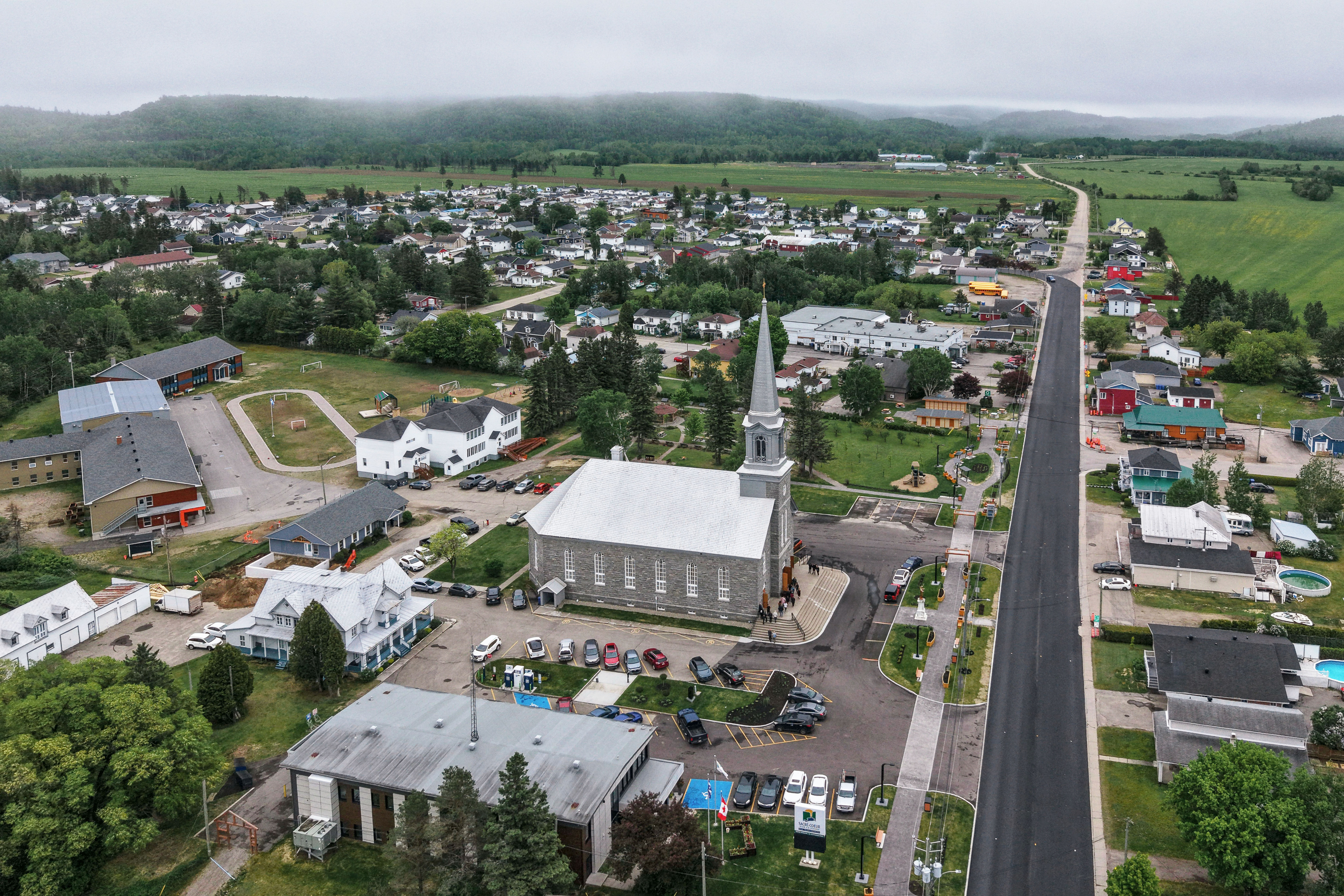

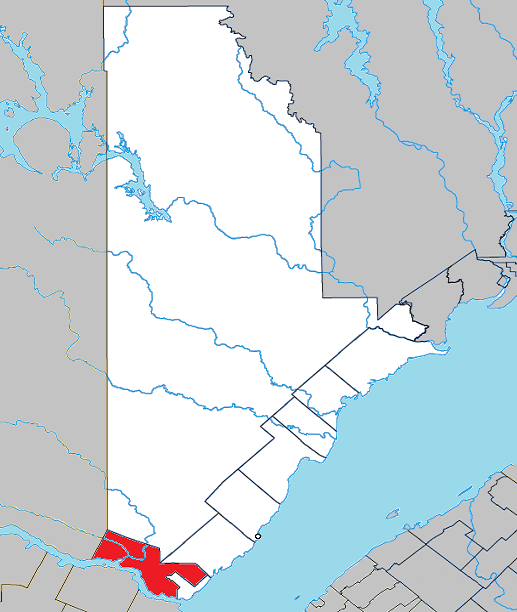
- Location within La Haute-Côte-Nord RCM

- Location in Côte-Nord region of Quebec
- Coordinates: 48°14′N 69°48′W
- Country: Canada
- Province: Quebec
- Region: Côte-Nord
- RCM: La Haute-Côte-Nord
- Constituted: June 13, 1973

Government
  - Mayor: Lise Boulianne
  - Federal riding: Côte-Nord—Kawawachikamach—Nitassinan
  - Prov. riding: René-Lévesque

Area
  - Total: 341.08 km^{2} (131.69 sq mi)
  - Land: 303.15 km^{2} (117.05 sq mi)

Population (2021)
  - Total: 1,684
  - Density: 5.6/km^{2} (15/sq mi)
  - Pop (2016-21): ▼6.6%
  - Dwellings: 77
- Time zone: UTC−5 (EST)
  - Summer (DST): UTC−4 (EDT)
- Postal code(s): G0T 1Y0
- Area codes: 418 and 581
- Highways: R-172
- Website: www.sacre-coeur.ca

Sacré-Cœur (French pronunciation: [sakʁe kœʁ]) is a municipality in the Côte-Nord region of the province of Quebec in Canada.

In addition to the main namesake population centre, the municipality also contains the following hamlets and localities: Chicoutillette, L'Anse-Creuse, L'Anse-de-Roche, Le Trou, Rivière-Sainte-Marguerite,

== History ==
Colonization of the area began in 1840 when families settled illegally in Rivière-Sainte-Marguerite. After 1842 settlement was encouraged but the communities remained isolated. Its post office opened in 1884 under the name Dolbeau (changed in 1927 to Sacré-Cœur–Saguenay). In 1904, the Parish of Sacré-Cœur-de-Jésus was formed, devoted to the Sacred Heart of Jesus, followed by the Parish Municipality of Sacré-Cœur-de-Jésus in 1915.

In 1937, the village itself separated from the parish municipality and became the Village Municipality of Sacré-Cœur-de-Jésus.

In 1973, the parish municipality and village municipality merged and became the Municipality of Sacré-Cœur.

== Demographics ==
Historical census populations – Sacré-Cœur, Quebec

Year	Pop.	±%
1976	2,049	—
1981	2,187	+6.7%
1986	2,121	−3.0%
1991	1,992	−6.1%
1996	2,081	+4.5%

Year	Pop.	±%
2001	2,053	−1.3%
2006	2,024	−1.4%
2011	1,881	−7.1%
2016	1,803	−4.1%
2021	1,684	−6.6%

Source: Statistics Canada

Private dwellings occupied by usual residents (2021): 744 (total dwellings: 877)

Mother tongue (2021):

- English as first language: 0.3%
- French as first language: 99.4%
- English and French as first language: 0.3%
- Other as first language: 0%

Historical census populations – Sacré-Cœur-de-Jésus Parish

Year	Pop.	±%
1921	946	—
1931	1,328	+40.4%
1941	883	−33.5%
1951	657	−25.6%

Year	Pop.	±%
1956	663	+0.9%
1961	685	+3.3%
1966	666	−2.8%
1971	562	−15.6%

Population counts are not adjusted for boundary changes.
Source: Statistics Canada

Historical census populations – Sacré-Cœur-de-Jésus Village

Year	Pop.	±%
1941	242	—
1951	686	+183.5%
1956	896	+30.6%

Year	Pop.	±%
1961	1,108	+23.7%
1966	1,305	+17.8%
1971	1,252	−4.1%

Source: Statistics Canada

== Economy ==
Agriculture and forestry are the basis of its economy. Several mills and factories dedicated to the secondary processing of wood form its industrial sector.

This economic base is increasingly supplemented by tourism, in particular in L'Anse-de-Roche sector along the Saguenay fjord. It provides accommodation, restaurants, an animal farm, and sea kayaking. Tourists can do various hiking, quad biking, dog sledding, cross-country skiing, snowshoeing, and snowmobiling. At Sainte-Marguerite Bay, part of the Saguenay Fjord National Park, is an interpretation center and a site for beluga observation.

== Local government ==
List of former mayors:

- Gilles Pineault (...–2013)
- Marjolaine Gagnon (2013–2017)
- Lise Boulianne (2017–present)

== See also ==
- List of municipalities in Quebec
- Vallée-de-la-Rivière-Sainte-Marguerite Biodiversity Reserve
