= Baie-Sainte-Catherine =

- Municipality
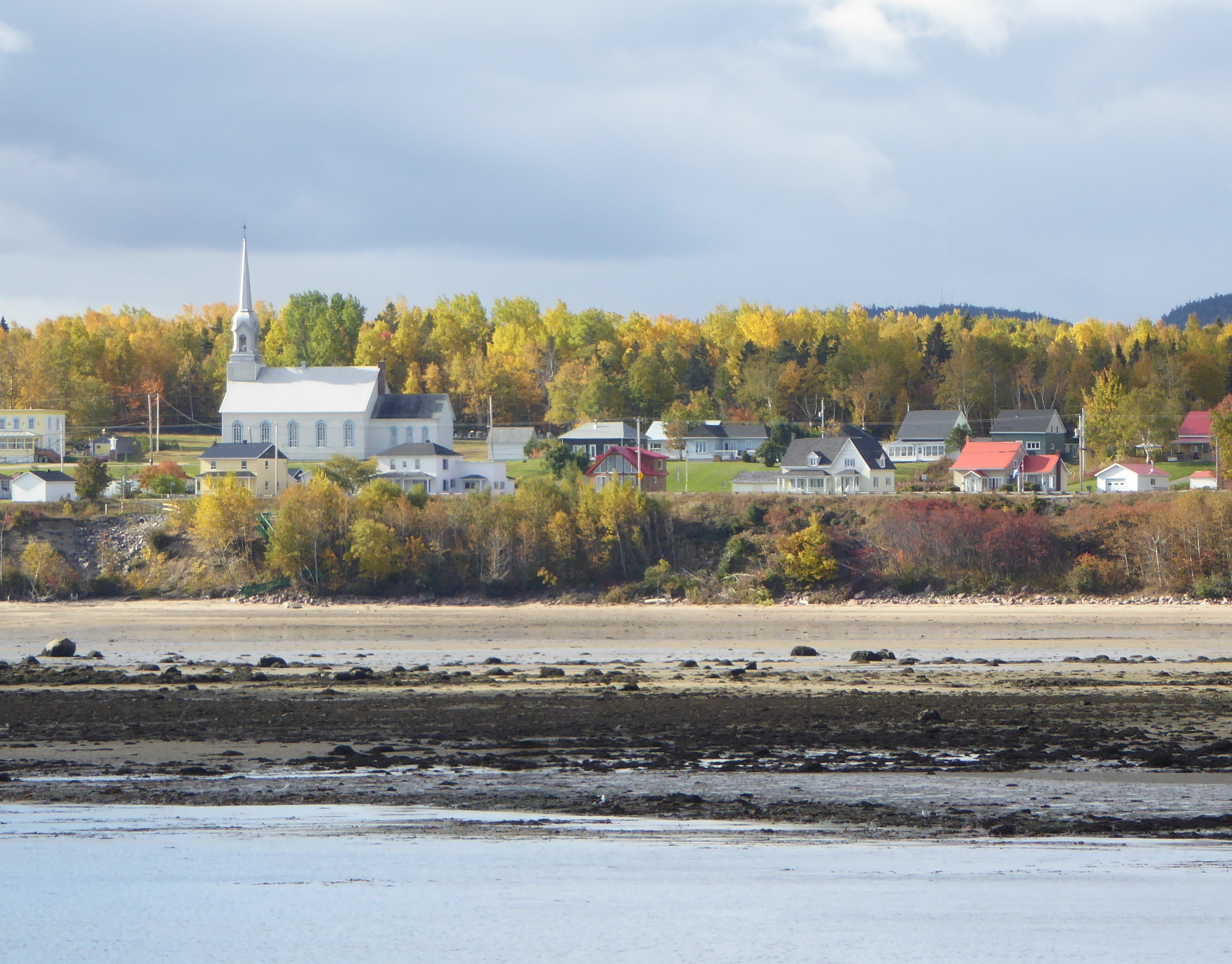

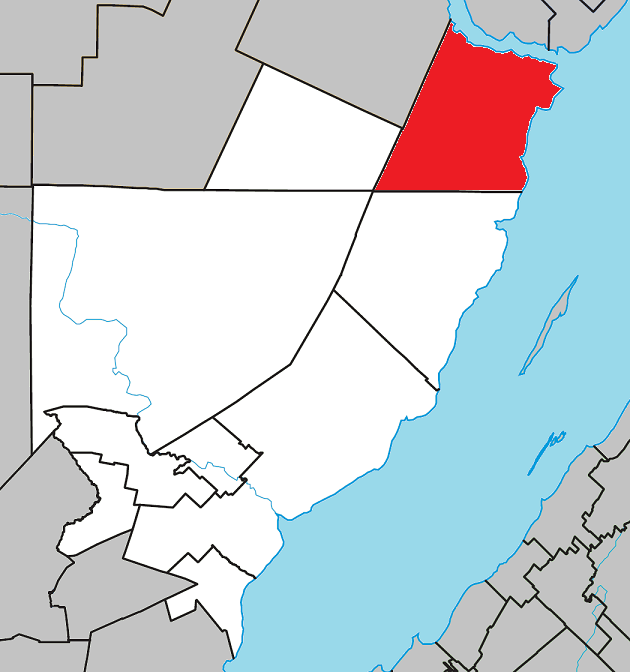
- Location within Charlevoix-Est RCM

- Location in central Quebec
- Coordinates: 48°06′N 69°44′W
- Country: Canada
- Province: Quebec
- Region: Capitale-Nationale
- RCM: Charlevoix-Est
- Settled: c. 1820
- Constituted: November 4, 1903

Government
  - Mayor: Donald Kenny
  - Federal riding: Montmorency—Charlevoix
  - Prov. riding: Charlevoix–Côte-de-Beaupré

Area
  - Total: 419.74 km^{2} (162.06 sq mi)
  - Land: 232.89 km^{2} (89.92 sq mi)

Population (2021)
  - Total: 184
  - Density: 0.8/km^{2} (2.1/sq mi)
  - Pop (2016-21): ▼10.7%
  - Dwellings: 125
- Time zone: UTC−5 (EST)
  - Summer (DST): UTC−4 (EDT)
- Postal code(s): G0T 1A0
- Area codes: 418 and 581
- Highways: R-138
- Website: www.baiestecatherine.com

Baie-Sainte-Catherine (French pronunciation: [bɛ sɛ̃t katʁin]) is a municipality/town in Quebec, Canada. The municipal's territory extends along the Saguenay and Saint Lawrence rivers, whereas the town itself is on the small St. Catherine Bay, which is located at the confluence of these two rivers. Its elevation is 260 feet.

It is the west terminus of the Baie-Ste-Catherine / Tadoussac ferry, which offers free and frequent service across the Saguenay River to Tadoussac. The ferry is part of Quebec Route 138 which is the main land link to Sept-Îles along the Côte-Nord.

Baie-Sainte-Catherine is a gateway to the Saguenay–St. Lawrence Marine Park and to the Saguenay Conservation Park. Therefore it caters to tourism, particularly to whale-watching cruises on the Saint Lawrence and Saguenay Rivers.

== History ==
Baie-Sainte-Catherine has the reputation of being the location of the historic meeting on May 27, 1603, between François Gravé Du Pont and Samuel de Champlain and the leaders of three Indian nations with whom they concluded an agreement that opened the Saint Lawrence River to French explorers.

On the stormy evening of November 27, 1686, the ship La Catherine went aground and sank in the bay at the mouth of the Saguenay River. On the 1731 map by Laure, this bay was identified as "Ance à la Catherine" (archaic French for "Catherine Cove"). At some uncertain point in time, "Saint" was added, following the former widespread practice in Quebec of sanctifying toponyms.

Around 1820, the first permanent settlers came to the Canard River area and formed a farming village. In 1843, William Price built a sawmill at the first falls on Canards River, that operated some ten years. In 1847, the mission was founded, and named "Saint-Firmin" by the bishop of Quebec. Its first cemetery opened in 1865 on Alouettes Point, followed by the first chapel of St. Firmin Mission in 1876, also on Alouettes Point. At the beginning of the 20th century, it transformed into an industrial village when another sawmill and cheese factory operated there.

In 1903, the village was incorporated as the Municipality of Saint-Firmin. But since the place was called Baie-Sainte-Catherine in common use, the municipality officially adopted this name in 1984.

== Demographics ==
=== Population ===
Canada census – Baie-Sainte-Catherine community profile

	2021	2016	2011
Population	184 (-10.7% from 2016)	206 (+1.0% from 2011)	204 (-10.1% from 2006)
Land area	232.89 km^{2} (89.92 sq mi)	236.37 km^{2} (91.26 sq mi)	236.62 km^{2} (91.36 sq mi)
Population density	0.8/km^{2} (2.1/sq mi)	0.9/km^{2} (2.3/sq mi)	0.9/km^{2} (2.3/sq mi)
Median age	61.2 (M: 61.6, F: 61.2)	56.9 (M: 56.8, F: 57.0)	53.5 (M: 54.5, F: 51.8)
Private dwellings	125 (total) 97 (occupied)	132 (total)	191 (total)
Median household income	$n/a	$n/a	$n/a

Notes: Income data suppressed to meet the confidentiality requirements of the Statistics Act.
References: 2021 2016 2011

Historical Census Data - Baie-Sainte-Catherine, Quebec

Year	Pop.	±%
1911	285	—
1921	248	−13.0%
1931	387	+56.0%
1941	401	+3.6%
1951	414	+3.2%
1956	455	+9.9%
1961	492	+8.1%

Year	Pop.	±%
1966	546	+11.0%
1971	536	−1.8%
1976	505	−5.8%
1981	424	−16.0%
1986	378	−10.8%
1991	312	−17.5%
1996	295	−5.4%

Year	Pop.	±%
2001	273	−7.5%
2006	227	−16.8%
2011	204	−10.1%
2016	206	+1.0%
2021	184	−10.7%

Source: Statistics Canada

=== Language ===
Mother tongue (2021):

- English as first language: 0%
- French as first language: 97.3%
- English and French as first language: 0%
- Other as first language: 0%

== See also ==
- 1925 Charlevoix–Kamouraska earthquake
- List of municipalities in Quebec
- Société des traversiers du Québec
