= Sagard, Quebec =

Sagard
- Unorganized territory
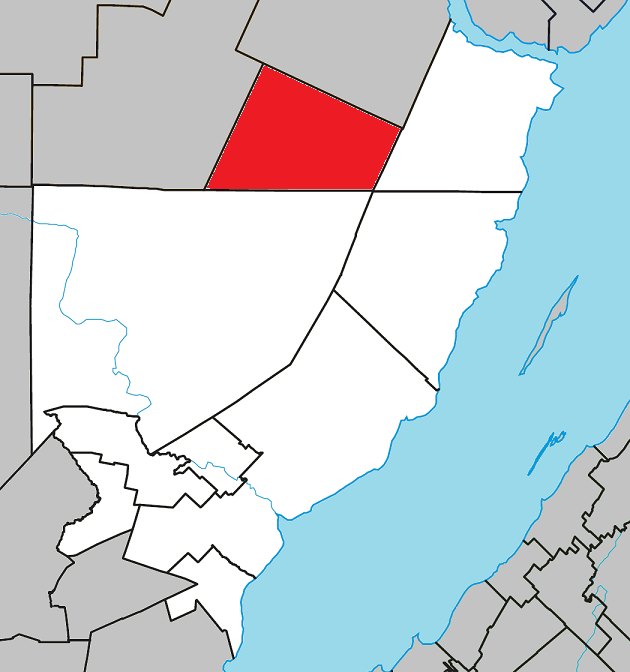
- Location within Charlevoix-Est RCM

- Location in central Quebec
- Coordinates: 48°02′N 70°04′W
- Country: Canada
- Province: Quebec
- Region: Capitale-Nationale
- RCM: Charlevoix-Est
- Constituted: unspecified

Government
  - Federal riding: Montmorency—Charlevoix
  - Prov. riding: Charlevoix–Côte-de-Beaupré

Area
  - Total: 213.3 km^{2} (82.4 sq mi)
  - Land: 204.59 km^{2} (78.99 sq mi)

Population (2021)
  - Total: 110
  - Density: 0.5/km^{2} (1.3/sq mi)
  - Pop (2016-21): ▼15.4%
  - Dwellings: 91
- Time zone: UTC−5 (EST)
  - Summer (DST): UTC−4 (EDT)
- Area codes: 418 and 581
- Highways: R-170

Sagard is an unorganized territory and hamlet in the Capitale-Nationale region of Quebec, Canada, part of the Charlevoix-Est Regional County Municipality. The hamlet of Sagard (48°01′47″N 70°04′02″W) is located on the eastern banks of the Little Saguenay River, along Route 170 between Saint-Siméon and Petit-Saguenay.

== Geography ==
The territory is characterized by a hilly terrain, dotted with many small lakes. Its elevation ranges from 274 meters (899 ft) at Lake David in the north-east, to 640 meters (2,100 ft) at the summit of Mount Chicot.

== History ==
The territory and hamlet are named after the geographic township of Sagard, which was proclaimed in 1919 and named in honour of Théodat Sagard, a missionary of the Recollects order who is mainly remembered for his writings on New France and the Hurons.

== Demographics ==
Historical Census Data – Sagard, Quebec

Year	Pop.	±%
1986	226	—
1991	223	−1.3%
1996	165	−26.0%
2001	160	−3.0%

Year	Pop.	±%
2006	143	−10.6%
2011	117	−18.2%
2016	130	+11.1%
2021	110	−15.4%

Source: Statistics Canada

Private dwellings occupied by usual residents (2021): 54 (total dwellings: 91)

== Notable residents ==
The Desmarais family has a large estate in Sagard.

== See also ==
- List of unorganized territories in Quebec
