= Saguenay Fjord National Park =

Provincial park in Quebec, Canada

- IUCN category II (national park)
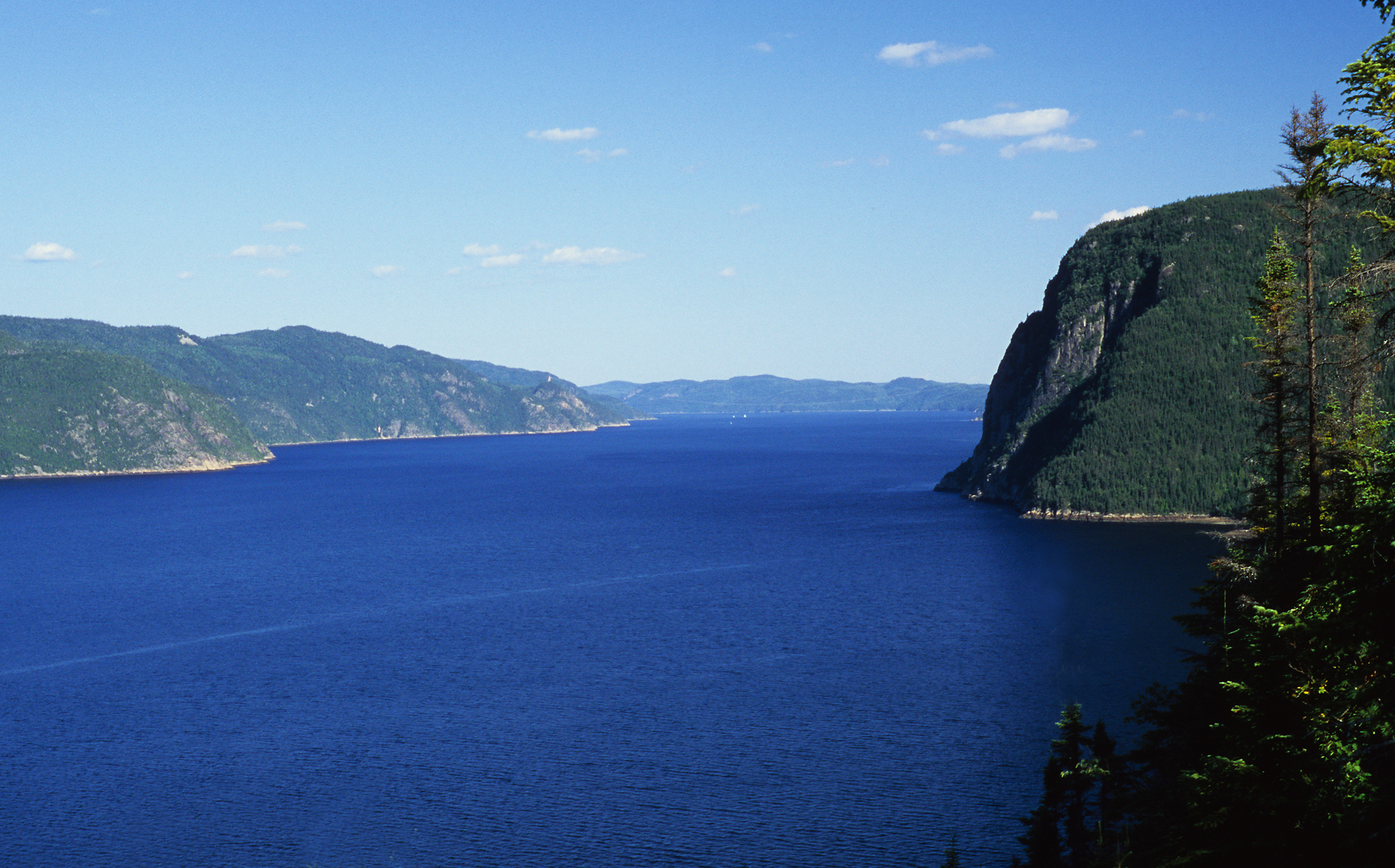

- Location within Quebec
- Interactive map of Saguenay Fjord National Park
- Location: Quebec, Canada
- Nearest city: Saguenay, Quebec
- Coordinates: 48°16′32″N 70°15′48″W
- Area: 319.3 square kilometres (123.28 sq mi)
- Established: June 8, 1983
- Governing body: SEPAQ

Saguenay Fjord National Park (French: parc national du Fjord-du-Saguenay) is a provincial park located in Quebec, Canada. In the regions of Saguenay–Lac-Saint-Jean, Charlevoix, Côte-Nord, and Bas-Saint-Laurent, the park is situated along the eastern end of the Saguenay River and adjoins the Saguenay–St. Lawrence Marine Park for over 100 km (60 mi.).

The park, originally named Saguenay National Park, was renamed on April 20, 2011.

== History ==
Aboriginals, including Innus, have inhabited the Saguenay Fjord area for thousands of years prior to the first Europeans arriving. The first European to visit the area was Jacques Cartier, in 1535. After Samuel de Champlain established a fort in 1608 on the northern shores of the St. Lawrence River (around present-day Quebec City), various Indigenous peoples, including Innu, Haudenosaunee (Iroquois), Huron, Algonquins and Cree all traded along the Saguenay River. Between 1628 and 1842, the Saguenay economy was heavily dependent on the fur trade.

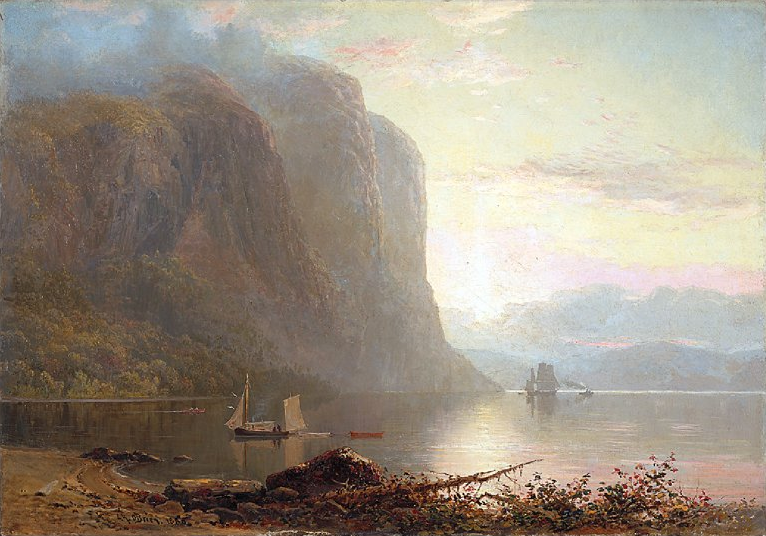
Sunrise on the Saguenay, Cape Trinity by landscape painter Lucius O'Brien (1880)

In 1838, settlers began moving into the Saguenay region. Between 1840 and 1920, the region had a sizable lumber industry. By the end of the 19th, much of the forests around the Saguenay River were depleted. In addition to the depletion of the forests, difficult terrain and the decline of the lumber industry led to the Saguenay area remaining mostly undeveloped into the 20th century.

Starting in 1970, the Quebec government began acquiring land around the fjord in hopes of protecting it. In 1982, the government held public hearings on the park's design and boundaries. Saguenay National Park was officially created on June 8, 1983. In 1984, the park was twinned with France's Cévennes National Park. In 1991, facilities were added to the Baie du Moulin-à-Baude section, while in 2000, facilities were added to the Baie-Sainte-Marguerite section. On April 20, 2011, the park changed its name from Saguenay National Park to Saguenay Fjord National Park in order to emphasize the fjord's distinctiveness of being one of the most southerly fjords in the Northern Hemisphere.

== Geography ==
Saguenay Fjord National Park lies along the shore of its namesake fjord. The Saguenay–St. Lawrence Marine Park lies to the southeast of the park. The park has lands within the following regions of Quebec: Saguenay-Lac-Saint-Jean, Charlevoix, Côte-Nord and Bas-Saint-Laurent. Saguenay Fjord National Park's Baie-Éternité visitor center is about 60 kilometres (37 mi) from Saguenay, Quebec.

Saguenay–St. Lawrence Marine Park Saguenay Fjord National Park Marine Park coordination area

Saguenay Fjord, the park's namesake, has a length of 105 kilometres (65 mi) and a width that varies between 2 kilometres (1.2 mi) and 4 kilometres (2.5 mi). The fjord has an average depth of 210 metres (690 ft), with the deepest point being 270 metres (890 ft). The cliffs along the fjord have an average height of 150 metres (490 ft), reaching a maximum height of 350 metres (1,150 ft). Saguenay Fjord flows into the St. Lawrence River; salt water from the river flows under a layer of freshwater originating from Lac St. Jean. Salt water takes up 93% of the water volume inside the fjord.

The park contains the following three regions:

- Baie-Éternité: This southwest region is reached through the village of Rivière-Éternité. The Saguenay Fjord Interpretation Centre is located here, and features exhibits about the formation of the fjord, its geology and wildlife.
- Baie-Sainte-Marguerite: The north region near Sacré-Cœur includes the Beluga Interpretation Centre. In the summer, beluga whales congregate in the bay.
- Baie du Moulin-à-Baude: Located around Tadoussac, this is the eastern region of the park. The Maison des Dunes Interpretation Centre features exhibits about the park's sand dunes, wildlife, marine life and ecosystems, and offers naturalist and fall bird-watching programs in conjunction with the Observatoire d'oiseaux de Tadoussac.

== Geology ==
The geological origins of Saguenay Fjord National Park can be traced to the Grenville orogeny during the Precambrian era. This event is considered to be the beginnings to the Laurentian Mountains. Around 200 million years ago, a rock basal complex between a north fault and a south fault collapsed, creating the Saguenay Graben. The graben was 250 kilometres (160 mi) long and 50 kilometres (31 mi) wide. During the last glacial period, the region was covered by ice sheets two to three kilometers deep. The ice sheets cut deep into the Saguenay graben, gouging the fjord in the process. The weight of the ice sheets also caused the region to sink. When the glaciers melted around 10,000 years ago, the graben was flooded by seawater. The subsequent post-glacial rebound lifted the terrain, shaping the fjord valleys in the process.

== Fauna ==
Animals that can be found in the park's forests include wolves, black bears, lynx, beavers, and moose. Peregrine falcons can be found on the fjord's cliffs. Seals, brook trout, Atlantic salmon, as well as isolated populations of Greenland halibut and Arctic cod can be found in the park's waters.

The park's waters are also home to four species of whales: the blue whale, the fin whale, the minke whale and the beluga whale. Due to pollution on the Saguenay river, the beluga whale population has significantly decreased in the region. This subpopulation is now considered to be endangered.

== Tourism ==
Saguenay Fjord National Park had 90,550 visitors in 2005, with 90% of those visitors coming from outside the region. Activities in the park include over 100 kilometres (62 mi) of hiking trails, 50 kilometres (31 mi) of skiing trails, camping, kayaking, sea kayaking, a Bateau Mouche tour of the fjord, snowshoeing and ice fishing. Visitors can also whale-watch. Accommodations at the park include cabins, huts and campgrounds.

== Gallery ==
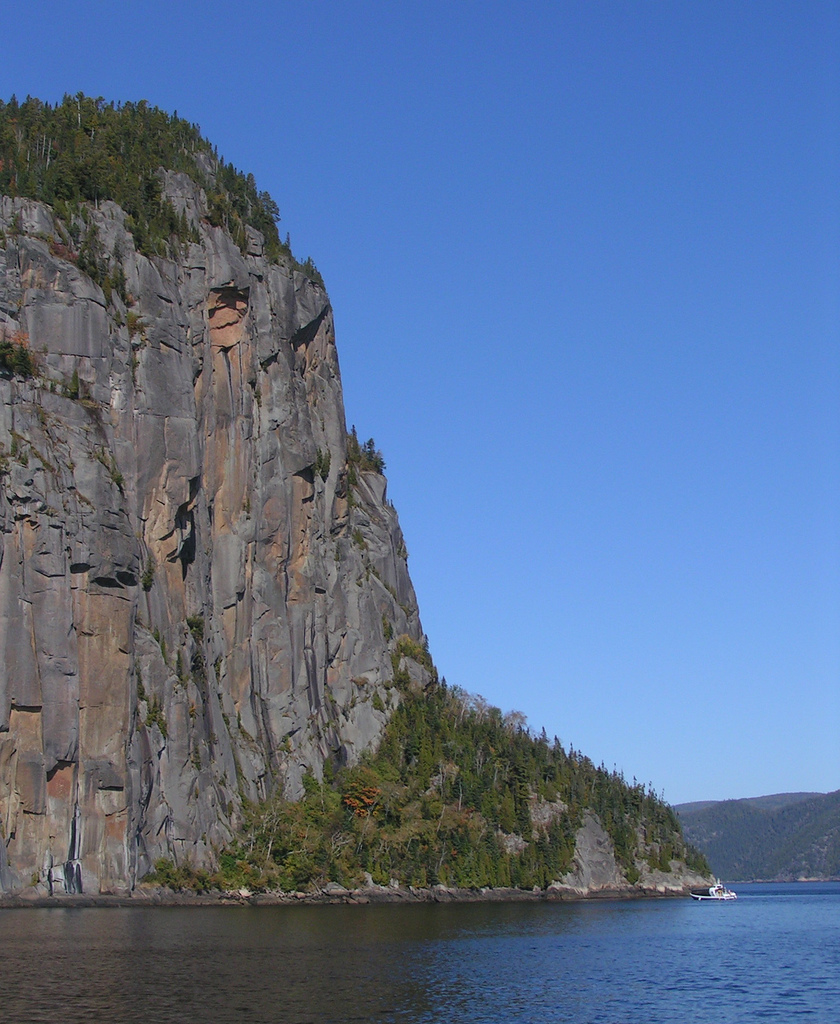
Cap Trinité

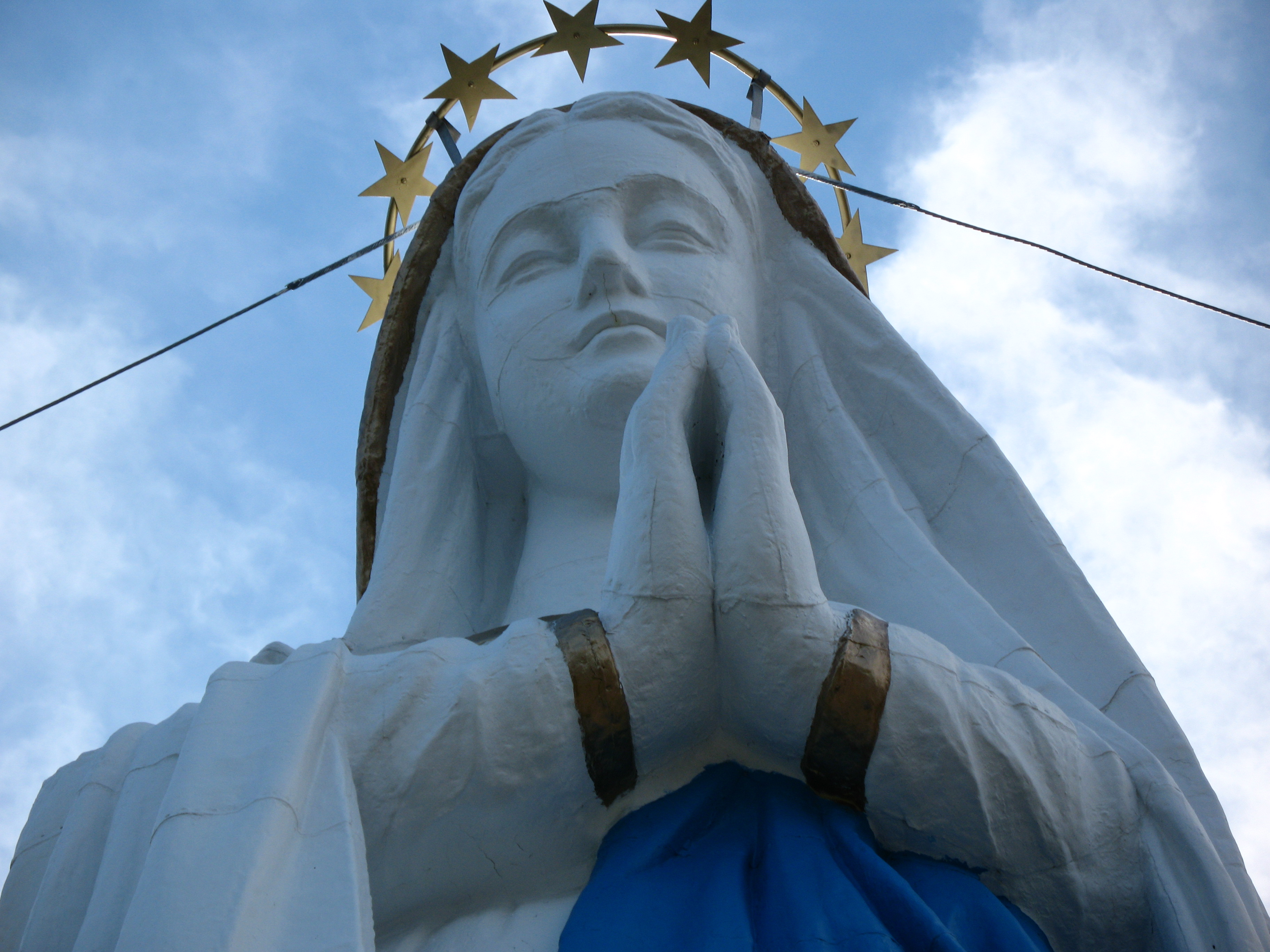
Notre-Dame-du-Saguenay Statue

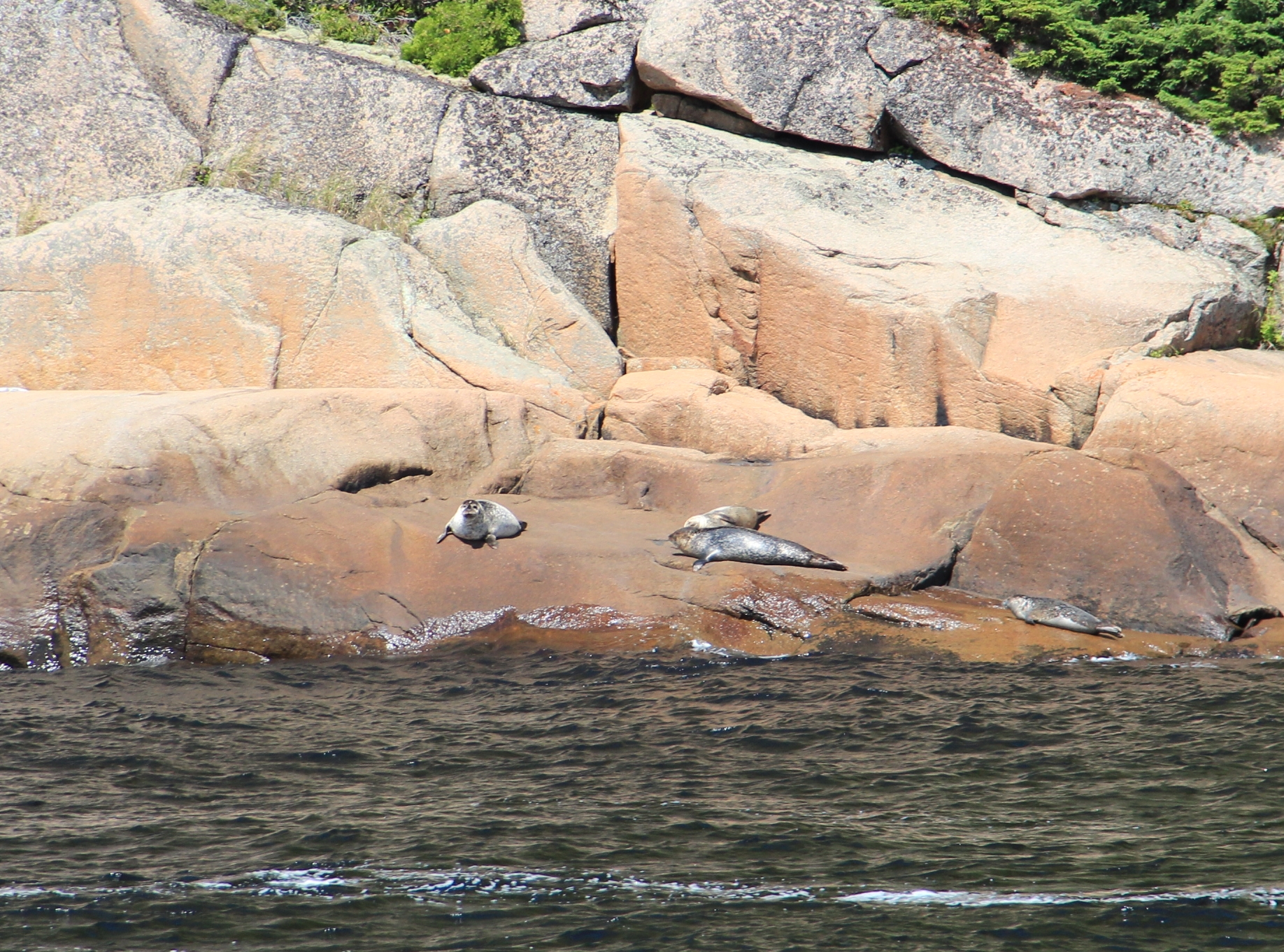
Harbour seals inside the park

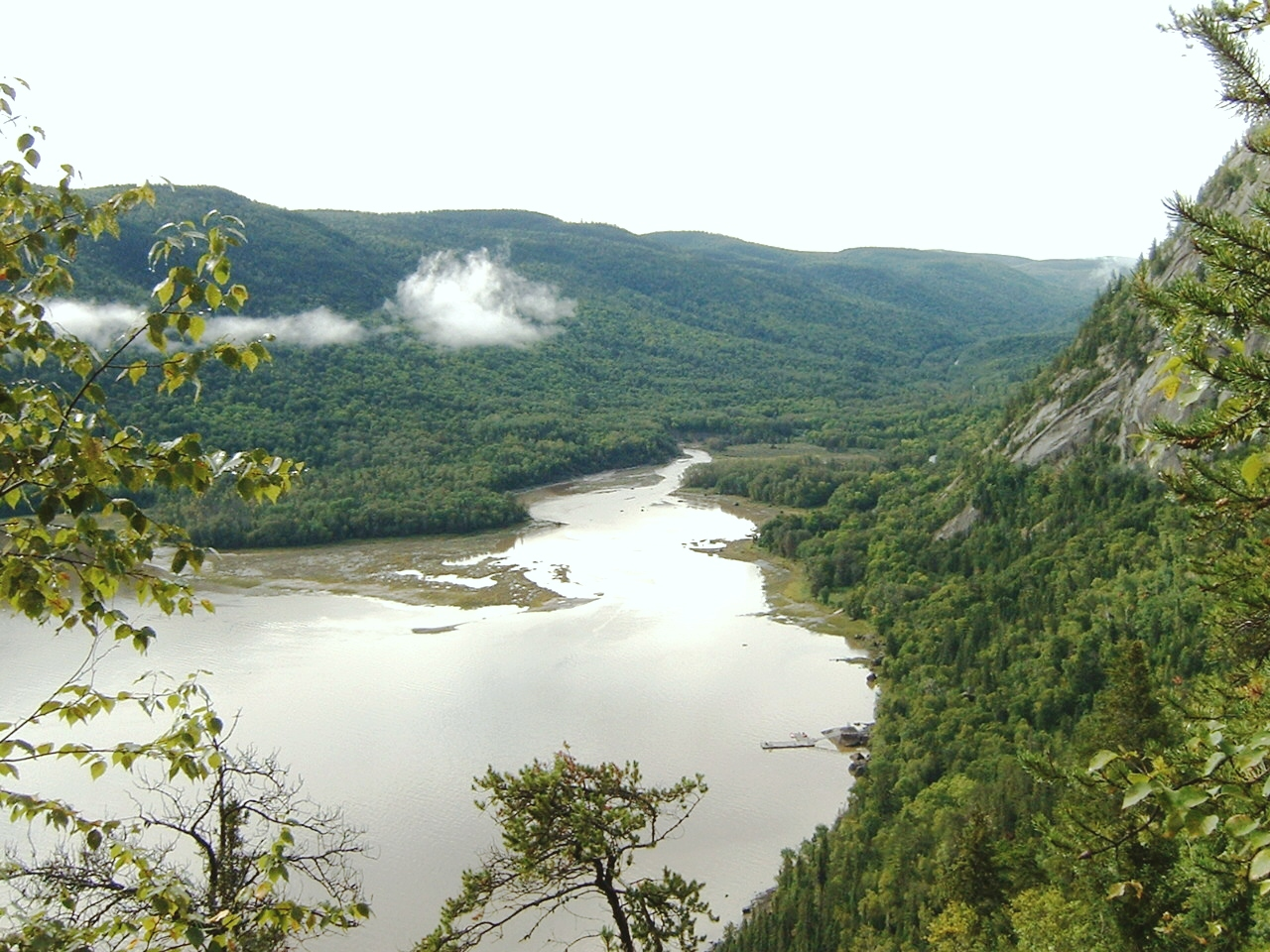
Baie Éternité

== See also ==
- Sépaq
- Vallée-de-la-Rivière-Sainte-Marguerite Biodiversity Reserve
