= Saguenay River =

Major tributary of the St. Lawrence River in Quebec, Canada

Saguenay River Saki-nip, Pitchitaouichetz (Innu-aimun) Kouate, Kyokiaye, Ouatheronnon (Wendat) Ktadoosôk (Mi'kmawi'simk)
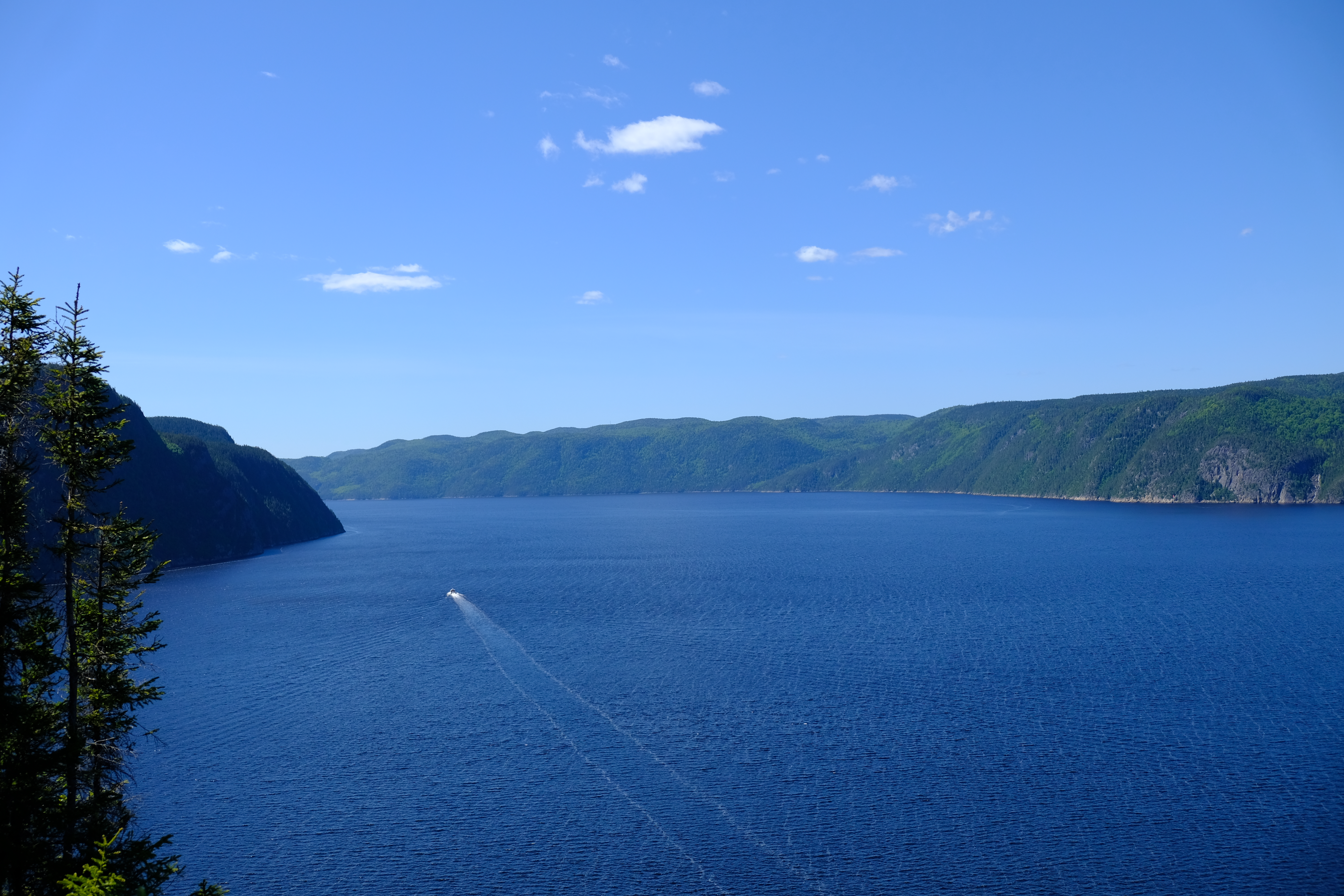
- Saguenay River, inside the Saguenay–St. Lawrence Marine Park from Cap Trinité

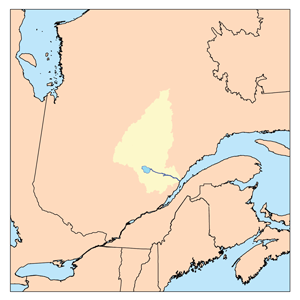
- Etymology: Innu: leaving water, watersource; river of death; river flowing between two mountain ranges Wendat: a large distance away; multiple spruces; opening, hole
- Native name: Rivière Saguenay (French)

Location
- Country: Canada
- Province: Quebec
- Region: Saguenay–Lac-Saint-Jean

Physical characteristics
- Source: Lac Saint-Jean
  - location: Alma, Saguenay–Lac-Saint-Jean
  - coordinates: 48°32′28″N 71°36′54″W
  - elevation: 102 m
- Mouth: Saint Lawrence River
  - location: Tadoussac / Baie-Sainte-Catherine, Côte-Nord / Capitale-Nationale
  - coordinates: 48°07′45″N 69°42′13″W
  - elevation: 3 m
- Length: 170 km (110 mi)
- Basin size: 88,000 km^{2} (34,000 sq mi)
- Discharge
  - location: Saint Lawrence River
  - average: 1,750 m^{3}/s (62,000 cu ft/s)

Basin features
- Tributaries
  - left: (upstream) ruisseau du Lac de l'Aqueduc, outlet of Lac de l'Anse à l'Eau, outlet of Petit lac de la Pointe à la Croix, outlet of Lac de la Boule, stream Desgagnés, ruisseau de l'Anse Creuse, cours d'eau Paul-Simard, outlet of Lac à Charlie, outlet of Lac des Mouches, Sainte-Marguerite, stream Gagnon, outlet of Lac de l'Anse à René, outlet of Lac Betty Baldwin, ruisseau de l'Ermite, outlet of Lac de la Voile, stream Biscambi, stream Fortin, stream Lac à Thomas, lake Damiens, outlet of Le Grand Lac, outlet of lake Pluto, stream Rouge, ruisseau à la Mine, rivière de la Descente des Femmes, outlet of lake Poléon, stream Neil, Pelletier River, décharge du lac José, ruisseau des îles, ruisseau Glissant, ruisseau du Moulin, rivière aux Outardes, stream Lajoie, Valin River, Caribou River, stream Sauvage, ruisseau à Paul, Michaud River (Saguenay River), rivière aux Vases (Saguenay River), Shipshaw River, outlet of lake Virgule, rivière des Aulnaies, stream des Portes de l'Enfer, outlet of lake Marcelle, stream Duclos, stream Gauthier, ruisseau du Lac Lucie, ruisseau de la Savane, ruisseau Gervais, outlet of lake Cimon, cours d'eau Beaumont, cours d'eau Larouche, cours d'eau Bouchard, cours d'eau Desbiens, Mistouk River, rivière aux Harts, rivière aux Chicots, stream Rouge.
  - right: (upstream) Petites Îles River, Saint-Étienne River, Saint-Athanase River, Petit Saguenay River, Saint-Jean River, Éternité River, stream Aimable, rivière à la Croix, ruisseau aux Cailles, Ha! Ha! River, rivière à Mars, rivière à Benjamin, rivière du Moulin, rivière aux Rats, Chicoutimi River, rivière aux Sables, La Petite Décharge.

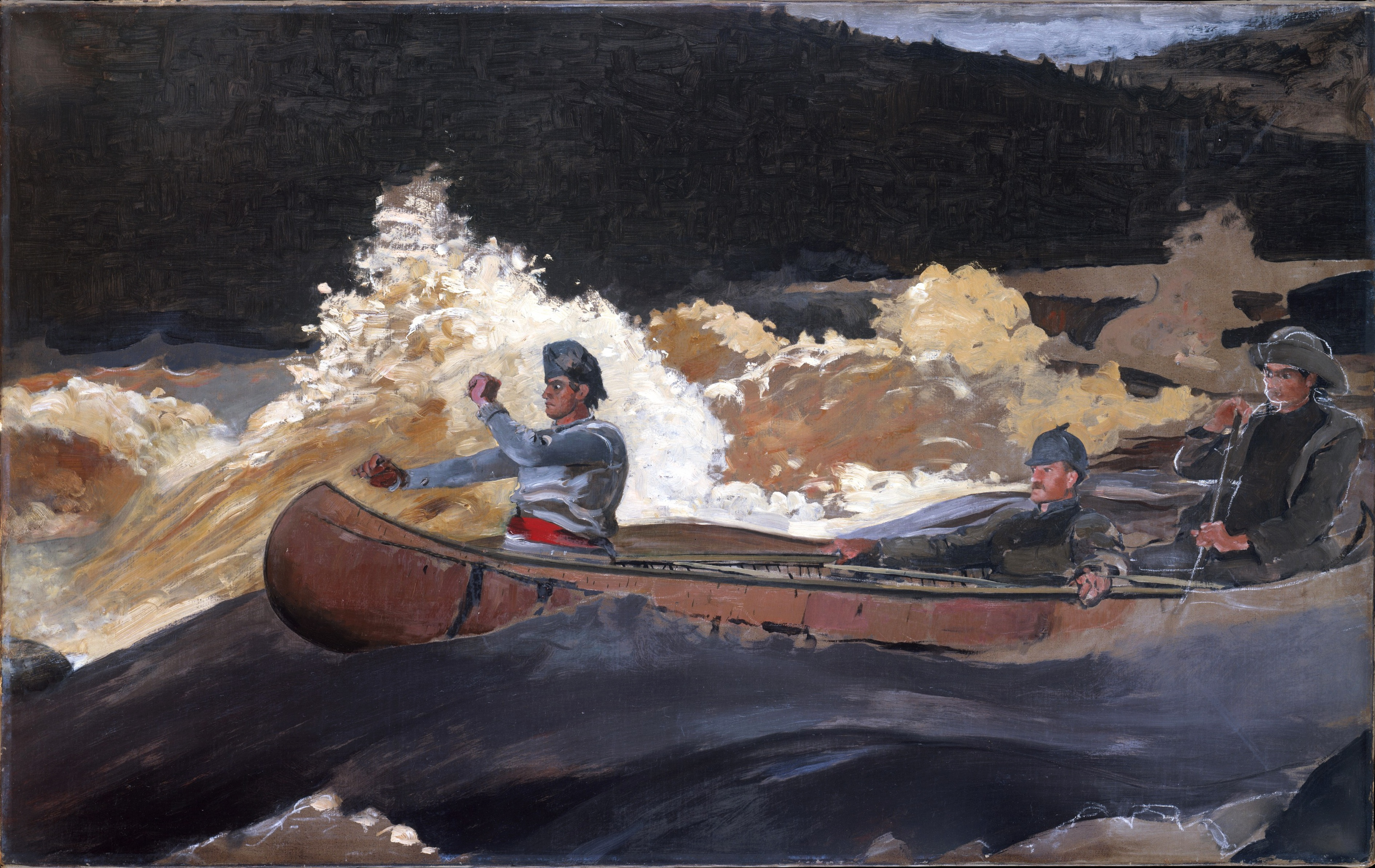
Shooting the Rapids, Saguenay River (1905-1910) by Winslow Homer

The Saguenay River (French: Rivière Saguenay, [ʁivjɛʁ saɡnɛ]) is a major river of Quebec, Canada. Draining Lac Saint-Jean in the Laurentian Highlands, it leaves Alma and runs east. The city of Saguenay is on the river, which drains into the Saint Lawrence River. Tadoussac, which was founded as a French colonial trading post in 1600, is located on the northeast bank at this site.

The river has a very high flow-rate and is bordered by steep cliffs associated with the Saguenay Graben. Tide waters flow in its fjord upriver as far as Chicoutimi (about 100 kilometres). Many beluga whales breed in the cold waters at its mouth, which makes Tadoussac a popular site for whale watching and sea kayaking, and Greenland sharks also frequent the depths of the river. The area of the confluence of the Saguenay and Saint Lawrence is protected by the Saguenay–St. Lawrence Marine Park, one of Canada's national parks.

== History ==
First Nations people, including Innus, have inhabited the Saguenay Fjord area for thousands of years prior to the arrvival of the first Europeans. The first European to visit the area was Jacques Cartier, in 1535. After Samuel de Champlain established a fort in 1608 on the northern shores of the St. Lawrence River around present-day Quebec City, various Indigenous peoples, including Innu, Haudenosaunee (Iroquois), Huron, Algonquins, and Cree, traded along the Saguenay River. They named the river for the legendary Kingdom of Saguenay, which is the namesake of Saguenay Herald of the Canadian Heraldic Authority.

In the 19th century, the river was begun to be used for transport and power by the logging and pulp and paper industries. A dam on the upper Saguenay generates hydroelectricity for local industries such as aluminum smelting and paper mills.

Severe flooding of the Saguenay's tributary rivers devastated the region in one of Canada's costliest natural disasters, the Saguenay Flood from July 18 to 21, 1996. However, an unexpected effect of the flood was to cover the heavily-contaminated sediments at the bottom of the river with 10 to 50 centimetres (3.9 to 19.7 in) of new, relatively clean sediments. Research has shown that the old sediments are no longer a threat to ecosystems.

== Geography ==
The Saguenay originates in Lac Saint-Jean at Alma. There are two channels: La Petite Décharge and La Grande Décharge. The dam of the Île Maligne hydroelectric plant is built on the latter. The island formed by both rivers is part of the municipality of Alma. At this place, the water is freshwater. Three bridges cross La Petite Décharge, and two others cross La Grande Décharge. When both rivers meet just east of Alma, the Saguenay really begins. It begins in the form of a reservoir several kilometres long unlike the rapids and powerful falls that dotted the river before the erection of dams.

At Shipshaw, the Saguenay splits again into two. On the north side is the Shipshaw hydroelectric station, and on the south side is the Chute-à-Caron power plant. It is here that the Aluminum Bridge is located.

Between Chicoutimi and Jonquière, the two spillway weirs come together to form the Saguenay, which becomes accessible to navigation at thar point. Moreover, Chicoutimi means "how deep is it" in Innu-aimun. In downtown Chicoutimi are the Dubuc Bridge and the Sainte-Anne Bridge. At Tadoussac, a ferry provides a link between Tadoussac and Baie-Sainte-Catherine.

=== Tributaries ===
The significant tributaries of the Saguenay are (going upstream):
- Sainte-Marguerite River
  - North-East Sainte-Marguerite River
- Saint-Jean River
- Ha! Ha! River
- Mars River
- Valin River
- Rivière du Moulin
- Chicoutimi River
- Shipshaw River
- Rivière aux Sables
  - Rivière aux Écorces
- Lake Saint-Jean
  - Peribonka River
    - Manouane River
  - Mistassini River
    - Mistassibi River
  - Ashuapmushuan River
  - Ouiatchouaniche River
  - Métabetchouane River

=== Riverside municipalities ===
Downstream
- Alma
- Saint-Charles-de-Bourget, Quebec
- Shipshaw, Quebec (amalgamated with Saguenay)
- Jonquière (amalgamated with Saguenay)
- Chicoutimi (amalgamated with Saguenay)
- Saint-Fulgence, Quebec
- La Baie, Quebec (at the bottom of Ha! Ha! Bay, amalgamated with Saguenay)
- Sainte-Rose-du-Nord, Quebec
- Rivière-Éternité, Quebec
- L'Anse-Saint-Jean, Quebec
- Petit-Saguenay, Quebec
- Sacré-Cœur, l'Anse de Roche
- Tadoussac, Quebec
- Baie-Sainte-Catherine, Quebec

== See also ==
- List of longest rivers of Canada
- List of Quebec rivers
- List of National Parks of Canada
