= Petit-Saguenay =

- Municipality
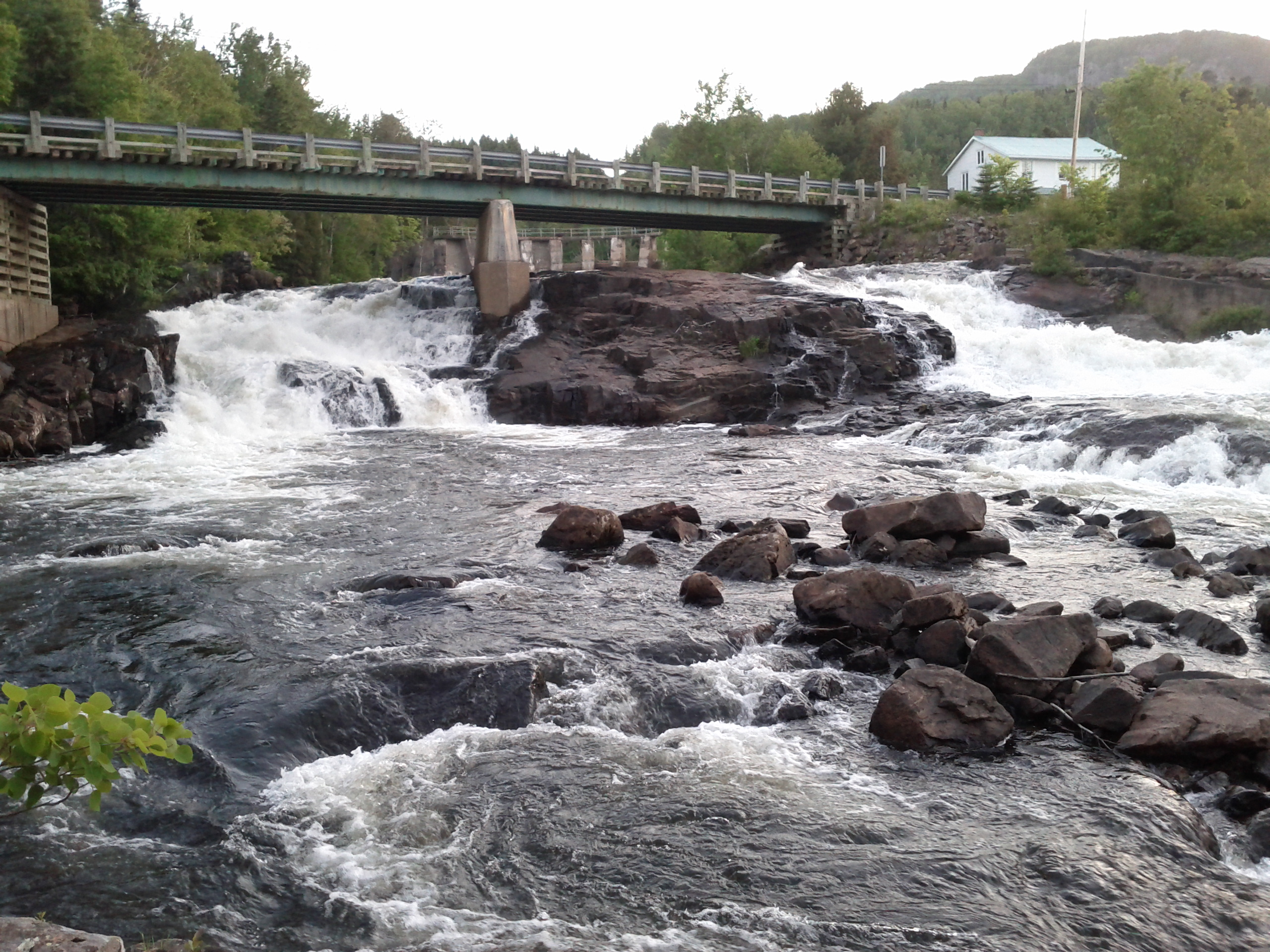

- Location in Saguenay–Lac-Saint-Jean Quebec
- Coordinates: 48°13′N 70°04′W
- Country: Canada
- Province: Quebec
- Region: Saguenay–Lac-Saint-Jean
- RCM: Le Fjord-du-Saguenay
- Constituted: August 12, 1919
- Named for: Petit Saguenay River

Government
  - Mayor: Philôme La France
  - Federal riding: Chicoutimi—Le Fjord
  - Prov. riding: Dubuc

Area
  - Total: 337.10 km^{2} (130.16 sq mi)
  - Land: 334.57 km^{2} (129.18 sq mi)

Population (2016)
  - Total: 634
  - Density: 1.9/km^{2} (4.9/sq mi)
  - Pop (2011–16): ▼12.8%
  - Dwellings: 378
- Time zone: UTC−5 (EST)
  - Summer (DST): UTC−4 (EDT)
- Postal code(s): G0V 1N0
- Area codes: 418 and 581
- Highways: R-170
- Website: www.petit-saguenay.com

Petit-Saguenay (French pronunciation: [pəti saɡnɛ]) is a municipality in the Canadian province of Quebec, located in Le Fjord-du-Saguenay Regional County Municipality. The municipality, located on Route 170 near L'Anse-Saint-Jean, had a population of 727 in the Canada 2011 Census, which dropped to 634 in the 2016 census.
