= Huard Lake =

Body of water in Quebec, Canada

- Location in Quebec
- Location: Ferland-et-Boilleau
- Coordinates: 48.0725°N 70.77611°W
- Lake type: Natural
- Primary inflows: Huard River
- Primary outflows: Huard River
- Basin countries: Canada
- Max. length: 2.8 km (1.7 mi)
- Max. width: 0.7 km (0.43 mi)
- Surface elevation: 401 m (1,316 ft)

The lac Huard is a body of water crossed by the Huard River, in the catchment area of the Ha! Ha! River and Saguenay River. This body of water is located in the municipality of Ferland-et-Boilleau, in the Le Fjord-du-Saguenay Regional County Municipality, in the administrative region of Saguenay–Lac-Saint-Jean, in the province of Quebec, in Canada.

A few secondary forest roads allow access to the Lac Huard watershed; these roads connect to route 381 (north-south direction) which runs along the Ha! Ha! River. These roads allow forestry and recreational tourism activities.

Forestry is the main economic activity in the sector; recreational tourism, second.

The surface of Lake Huard is usually frozen from the beginning of December to the end of March, however the safe circulation on the ice is generally made from mid-December to mid-March.

== Geography ==
The "Lac Huard" is located in the southeastern part of the municipality of Ferland-et-Boilleau, about 7.2 km (4.5 mi) north of the boundary of the administrative regions of Saguenay–Lac-Saint-Jean and of the Capitale-Nationale. The main watersheds near Lake Huard are:

- north side: Huard River, Ha! Ha! River, Berger lake, Belle Truite lake, lac des Cèdres, rivière des Cèdres, Bras de Ross, Pierre River;
- East side: Lac Charny, Lac de la Grosse Cabane, ruisseau John, Cami River, rivière à la Catin;
- south side: Ha! Ha! River, Lake Ha! Ha!, Petit lac Ha! Ha!, rivière à Pierre, Malbaie River, Cruche River, Porc-Épic River;
- west side: Pierre river, Ha! Ha! River, Lake Ha! Ha!, rivière à Mars, Bras d'Hamel.

The "Lake Huard" has a length of 2.8 km (1.7 mi) in the shape of a crescent open to the southwest, a maximum width of 0.5 km (0.31 mi), an altitude is 401 m (1,316 ft) and an area of . It includes a marsh area around the outlet of "Lac Charny" and "Lac de la Grosse Cabane". Its mouth is located to the northwest, at:

- 2.9 km (1.8 mi) east of the village center of Boileau in the municipality of Ferland-et-Boilleau;
- 4.0 km (2.5 mi) southwest of Lac Charny;
- 3.5 km (2.2 mi) south-east of the dam at the mouth of Lake Ha! Ha! which is crossed by the Ha! Ha! River;
- 6.0 km (3.7 mi) north-east of a mountain peak which reaches 781 km (485 mi);
- 5.5 km (3.4 mi) south-east of the confluence of the Huard river and the Ha! Ha! River;
- 26.6 km (16.5 mi) south-east of the confluence of the Ha! Ha! River And Baie des Ha! Ha!.

From the mouth of Lake Huard, the current:

- descends the course of the Huard River on 5.9 km (3.7 mi) towards the northwest;
- descends the course of the Ha! Ha! River on 29.1 km (18.1 mi) towards the northwest;
- crosses the Baie des Ha! Ha! on 11 km (6.8 mi) towards the northeast;
- descends the course of the Saguenay River over 93.1 km (57.8 mi) east to Tadoussac where the latter river flows into the St. Lawrence River.

== Toponymy ==
The toponym "Huard Lake" was formalized on January 9, 1986, by the Commission de toponymie du Québec.

== Appendices ==
=== Related articles ===
- Le Fjord-du-Saguenay Regional County Municipality
- Ferland-et-Boilleau, a municipality
- Huard River
- Ha! Ha! River
- Baie des Ha! Ha!
- Saguenay River
