= Bras Rocheux =

River in Quebec, Canada

- Location within Quebec

Location
- Country: Canada
- Province: Quebec
- Region: Saguenay-Lac-Saint-Jean
- Regional County Municipality: Le Fjord-du-Saguenay Regional County Municipality and Saguenay (city)
- Municipalities: Ferland-et-Boilleau

Physical characteristics
- Source: Lac Surprise
  - location: Ferland-et-Boilleau
  - coordinates: 48.14300°N 70.95390°W
  - elevation: 319 m (1,047 ft)
- Mouth: Bras d'Hamel
  - location: Saguenay (ville)
  - coordinates: 48.17183°N 70.89777°W
  - elevation: 170 m (560 ft)
- Length: 12.5 km (7.8 mi)
- Discharge
  - location: Ferland-et-Boilleau

The Bras Rocheux is a tributary of the Bras d'Hamel, flowing in the administrative region of Saguenay–Lac-Saint-Jean, in the province of Quebec, in Canada. The course of the river successively crosses:

- the municipality of Ferland-et-Boilleau, in the Le Fjord-du-Saguenay Regional County Municipality;
- the unorganized territory of Lac-Ministuk of the same MRC;
- the city of Saguenay (city).

The route 381 serves the western side of the Ha! Ha! River and cut the lower part of the "Bras Rocheux". A few other secondary forest roads serve the Arms of the "Bras Rocheux" Valley, especially for forestry and recreational tourism activities.

Forestry is the main economic activity in this valley; recreational tourism, second.

The surface of the Rocky Arm is usually frozen from the beginning of December to the end of March, however the safe circulation on the ice is generally done from mid-December to mid-March.

== Geography ==
The main watersheds adjacent to the "Bras Rocheux" are:

- north side: Ha! Ha! River, Baie des Ha! Ha!;
- east side: rivière des Cèdres, Lac des Cèdres, "Lac du Gros Poisson";
- south side: Ha! Ha! River, rivière à Mars;
- west side: Mars river, la Petite Décharge, Simoncouche River.

The "Bras Rocheux" rises at the mouth of Surprise Lake (length: 0.7 km (0.43 mi); altitude: 319 m (1,047 ft) which is located in municipality of Ferland-et-Boilleau. This crescent-shaped lake open to the southeast has a marsh area at the northwest end and another at the south end. The mouth is located at:

- 3.1 km (1.9 mi) west of the course of Bras d'Hamel;
- 5.2 km (3.2 mi) south-east of the confluence of the Bras du Coco and the rivière à Mars;
- 5.5 km (3.4 mi) west of a curve of the Ha! Ha! River;
- 8.7 km (5.4 mi) south-east of the confluence of "Bras Rocheux" and Bras d'Hamel;
- 16.4 km (10.2 mi) south of the Baie des Ha! Ha!.

The "Bras Rocheux" flows over 12.5 km (7.8 mi) with a drop of 149 m (489 ft) entirely in the forest zone, according to the following segments:

- 0.3 km (0.19 mi) eastwards, to the outlet (coming from the south-east) of a stream;
- 0.5 km (0.31 mi) to the east by forming a hook to the north and crossing an area of marsh, to the outlet (coming from the east) of an unidentified lake;
- 3.0 km (1.9 mi) towards the northwest by collecting the discharge (coming from the east) of a lake, up to the discharge (coming from the southwest) of an unidentified lake;
- 2.9 km (1.8 mi) towards the north-east, crossing a marsh area from the middle of this segment, to the outlet (coming from the west) of some lakes;
- 2.4 km (1.5 mi) east to the outlet (coming from the east) of a stream, then northeast to the outlet of a lake (coming from the 'Where is);
- 1.6 km (0.99 mi) towards the north-east by collecting the discharge (coming from the east) of a lake, to the discharge (coming from the west) of some lakes;
- 1.8 km (1.1 mi) towards the north curving towards the northeast by cutting the route 381, to its mouth.

Le "bras Rocheux" flows into a bend in the river on the west bank of the Bras d'Hamel, next to route 381. This confluence is located at:

- 0.8 km (0.50 mi) downstream of the confluence of the "Bras Rocheux" and Bras d'Hamel;
- 3.1 km (1.9 mi) south-west of the "lac à Doré";
- 4.9 km (3.0 mi) south-west of lac des Cèdres;
- 14.4 km (8.9 mi) south-east of Bagotville Airport terminal;
- 8.4 km (5.2 mi) south-east of the confluence of the Mars river and the Baie des Ha! Ha!.

From the confluence of the "Bras Rocheux" with the Bras d'Hamel, the current follows the course of the Bras d'Hamel on 0.8 km (0.50 mi) towards the northeast, the course of the rivière à Mars on 11.8 km (7.3 mi) towards the northeast, crosses the Baie des Ha! Ha! north-east on 11.0 km (6.8 mi), then the course of the Saguenay River east on 99.5 km (61.8 mi) until Tadoussac where it merges with the Saint Lawrence estuary.

== Toponymy ==
The term "rocheux" (English: rocky) turns out to be a descriptive adjective, because of the presence of rocks on the course of the river.

The toponym "Bras Rocheux" was formalized on December 5, 1968, at the Place Names Bank of the Commission de toponymie du Québec.

== See also ==
- Le Fjord-du-Saguenay Regional County Municipality
- Lac-Ministuk, a TNO
- Saguenay (city), a city
- Bras d'Hamel
- Ha! Ha! River
- Baie des Ha! Ha!
- Saguenay River
- List of rivers of Quebec
