= Huard River =

River in Saguenay, Quebec Canada

- Location within Quebec

Location
- Country: Canada
- Province: Quebec
- Region: Saguenay-Lac-Saint-Jean
- Regional County Municipality: Le Fjord-du-Saguenay Regional County Municipality
- Municipalities: Ferland-et-Boilleau

Physical characteristics
- Source: Forest stream in the mountains
  - location: Ferland-et-Boilleau
  - coordinates: 48.03647°N 70.77247°W
  - elevation: 487 m (1,598 ft)
- Mouth: Ha! Ha! River
  - location: Ferland-et-Boilleau
  - coordinates: 48.12861°N 70.81528°W
  - elevation: 330 m (1,080 ft)
- Length: 11.5 km (7.1 mi)
- Discharge
  - location: Ferland-et-Boilleau

Basin features
- Tributaries
  - right: (from the mouth) Outlet (via "lac Huard") of lakes Charny and "de la Grosse Cabane"

The Huard River is a tributary of the Ha! Ha! River, Flowing in the municipality of Ferland-et-Boilleau, in the Le Fjord-du-Saguenay Regional County Municipality, in the administrative region of Saguenay-Lac-Saint-Jean, in the province of Quebec, in Canada.

The Huard River valley is served mainly by the route 381 which runs along the course of the Ha! Ha! River and Lake Ha! Ha! for the needs of forestry, agriculture and recreational tourism activities.

Forestry is the main economic activity in the sector; recreational tourism, second.

The surface of the Huard River is usually frozen from the beginning of December to the end of March, however safe circulation on the ice is generally done from mid-December to mid-March.

== Geography ==
The main watersheds adjacent to the Huard River are:

- north side: Ha! Ha! River, Lac du Berger, Bras de Ross, Rivière des Cèdres, Pierre River;
- East side: Lac Charny, "Lac de la Grosse Cabane", ruisseau à John, Cami River, Malbaie River;
- south side: Ha! Ha! River, Lake Ha! Ha!, Petit lac Ha! Ha!, Pierre River, Malbaie River, Cruche River, Porc-Épic River;
- west side: rivière à Pierre, Ha! Ha! River, lake Ha! Ha!, rivière à Mars, Bras d'Hamel.

The Huard River originates from a mountain stream (altitude:487 m (1,598 ft) in a deep valley. This source is located at:

- 2.7 km (1.7 mi) south-east of Huard Lake;
- 3.0 km (1.9 mi) north of Petit lac Ha! Ha!;
- 5.2 km (3.2 mi) south-east of the dam at the mouth of Lake Ha! Ha! which is crossed by the Ha! Ha! River;
- 2.7 km (1.7 mi) north-west of a mountain peak which reaches 869 m (2,851 ft);
- 10.8 km (6.7 mi) south-east of the confluence of the Huard River and Ha! Ha! River.

From its source, the course of the Huard River flows over 11.5 km (7.1 mi) according to the following segments:

- 5.6 km (3.5 mi) north-east across Lake Huard (length: 1.4 km (0.87 mi); altitude: 401 m (1,316 ft)), to its mouth. Note: Lac Huard receives the discharge on the east side of Lacs Charny and de la Grosse Cabane;
- 5.9 km (3.7 mi) north-west, to its mouth.

The Huard River flows into a small bay on the west shore of Lake Ha! Ha!. This mouth is located at:

- 4.7 km (2.9 mi) south-east of the center of the village of Ferland;
- 7.2 km (4.5 mi) north-west of Huard Lake;
- 8.4 km (5.2 mi) north-east of the dam on the Ha! Ha! River located at the mouth of Lake Ha! Ha!;
- 19.8 km (12.3 mi) south-east of the confluence of the Ha! Ha! and Baie des Ha! Ha!;
- 35.6 km (22.1 mi) south-east of downtown Saguenay (city).

From the confluence of the Huard River, the current follows the course of the Ha! Ha! River on 39.1 km (24.3 mi) generally towards the northeast, crosses the Baie des Ha! Ha! on 11.0 km (6.8 mi) towards the northeast, then follows the course of the Saguenay River on 99.5 km (61.8 mi) in the east until Tadoussac where it merges with the Saint Lawrence estuary.

== Toponymy ==
The toponym "Huard River" was formalized on September 26, 1997, by the Commission de toponymie du Québec.

== See also ==
- List of rivers of Quebec
