= Bras d'Hamel =

Stream in Saguenay-Lac-Saint-Jean, Quebec, Canada

- Location within Quebec

Location
- Country: Canada
- Province: Quebec
- Region: Saguenay-Lac-Saint-Jean and Saguenay (city)
- Regional County Municipality: Le Fjord-du-Saguenay Regional County Municipality
- Municipalities: Ferland-et-Boilleau

Physical characteristics
- Source: Confluence of forest streams
  - location: Ferland-et-Boilleau
  - coordinates: 48.09140°N 70.96545°W
  - elevation: 420 m (1,380 ft)
- Mouth: Ha! Ha! River
  - location: Saguenay (ville)
  - coordinates: 48.24305°N 70.8475°W
  - elevation: 170 m (560 ft)
- Length: 26.8 km (16.7 mi)
- Discharge
  - location: Ferland-et-Boilleau

Basin features
- Tributaries
  - right: (from the mouth) Bras Rocheux, outlet of lac Rémis, outlet of lac Hervé.

The Bras d'Hamel is a stream flowing in the municipality of Ferland-et-Boilleau (MRC of Le Fjord-du-Saguenay Regional County Municipality) and in the city of Saguenay (city), in the administrative region of Saguenay-Lac-Saint-Jean, in the province of Quebec, in Canada.

The "Bras d'Hamel" valley is served mainly by the route 381 which runs along its entire course for forestry, agriculture and recreational tourism activities.

Forestry is the main economic activity in the sector; recreational tourism, second.

The surface of "Bras d'Hamel" is usually frozen from early December to late March, however safe circulation on the ice is generally from mid-December to mid-March.

== Geography ==
The main neighboring watersheds of Bras d'Hamel are:

- north side: Ha! Ha! River, Bras du Coco, Bras Rocheux, Saguenay River;
- east side: Ha! Ha! River, Rivière des Cèdres, Lake Ha! Ha!, Malbaie River;
- south side: Ha! Ha! River, Lake Ha! Ha!, rivière à Mars, Bras de Ross, rivière à Pierre;
- west side: Bras Rocheux, Bras du Coco, rivière à Mars, rivière à Mars North-West, rivière du Moulin.

The Bras d'Hamel rises at the mouth of Girard Lake (altitude: 420 m (1,380 ft)) in the Laurentides Wildlife Reserve. This source is located at:

- 1.9 km (1.2 mi) east of the course of the rivière à Mars;
- 6.4 km (4.0 mi) east of the rivière à Pierre;
- 10.7 km (6.6 mi) east of the dam at the mouth of Lake Ha! Ha! which is crossed by the Ha! Ha! River;
- 8.3 km (5.2 mi) south-west of a mountain peak which reaches 961 m (3,153 ft);
- 19.6 km (12.2 mi) south of the confluence of Bras d'Hamel and Ha! Ha! River.

From its source, the course of Bras d'Hamel flows over 26.8 km (16.7 mi) according to the following segments:

- 6.4 km (4.0 mi) towards the northeast by forming a loop towards the north at the start of the segment to go around a mountain whose summit reaches 484 m (1,588 ft) and collecting the discharge (coming from the south) of an unidentified lake, to the outlet (coming from the south) of Lac Renouche;
- 7.7 km (4.8 mi) to the north by collecting the outlet (coming from the west) from Lake Hervé, to the outlet (coming from the west) from Lake Rémis;
- 4.8 km (3.0 mi) to the north in a deep valley, then passing the village of Ferland to the outlet (coming from the west) of a stream;
- 7.1 km (4.4 mi) north-west along route 381, to a bend corresponding to the outlet of Bras Rocheux (coming from South);
- 0.8 km (0.50 mi) northwards in agricultural area to its mouth.

The Arm of Hamel flows onto the west bank of the Ha! Ha! River. This mouth is located at:

- 0.3 km (0.19 mi) downstream of a dam on the Ha! Ha! River;
- 0.9 km (0.56 mi) upstream of a road bridge spanning the Ha! Ha! River;
- 6.1 km (3.8 mi) west of a bay in lac des Cèdres;
- 7.2 km (4.5 mi) north of the village center of Ferland (village);
- 8.0 km (5.0 mi) south-east of the confluence of the Ha! Ha! River and Baie des Ha! Ha!.

From the confluence of "Bras d'Hamel", the current follows the course of the Ha! Ha! River on 11.8 km (7.3 mi) generally towards the northeast, crosses Baie des Ha! Ha! on 11.0 km (6.8 mi) northeast, then follows the course of the Saguenay River on 99.5 km (61.8 mi) east to Tadoussac where it merges with the Saint Lawrence estuary.

== Toponymy ==
The toponym "Bras d'Hamel" was formalized on December 5, 1968, by the Commission de toponymie du Québec.

== See also ==
- Le Fjord-du-Saguenay Regional County Municipality
- Saguenay (city)
- Ferland-et-Boilleau, a municipality
- Bras Rocheux
- Ha! Ha! River
- Baie des Ha! Ha!
- Saguenay River
- List of rivers of Quebec
