= Ruisseau à John =

Ruisseau à John (Creek to John)

Location
- Country: Canada
- Province: Quebec
- Region: Capitale-Nationale
- Regional County Municipality: Charlevoix Regional County Municipality

Physical characteristics
- Source: Balisé Lake
  - location: Lalemant
  - coordinates: 48.04520°N 70.72175°W
  - elevation: 467 m (1,532 ft)
- Mouth: Malbaie River
  - location: Lalemant
  - coordinates: 48.005°N 70.655°W
  - elevation: 373 m (1,224 ft)
- Length: 8.1 km (5.0 mi)
- Discharge
  - location: Lalemant

Basin features
- River system: Gulf of St. Lawrence
- Tributaries
  - left: Discharge of "Petit lac à John", discharge of Desprez Lake, discharge of lakes Triangle and Rond,
  - right: Discharge of "Lac de la Cabane", discharge of lake Fleurigny.

The ruisseau à John (John Creek) is a tributary of the Malbaie River, flowing into the Lalemant unorganized territory, into the Le Fjord-du-Saguenay Regional County Municipality, in the Saguenay-Lac-Saint-Jean administrative region, in the province [of Quebec, in Canada. The course of the stream in John crosses the zec du Lac-Brébeuf.

The "ruisseau à John" area is served by "chemin du Lac-Travers" (Lac Travers Road). It is served indirectly by chemin du Lac à la Catin which connects to the west with the "chemin du Lac-Travers" and the Desprez Lake Road. The middle section of the Catin River Valley is served by Périgny Road and "Chemin du Lac de la Souris", for forestry and recreational tourism purposes. The lower part is served by the Lac Brébeuf road. Some secondary forest roads serve this valley.

Forestry is the main economic activity of the sector; recreational tourism activities, second.

The surface of "ruisseau à John" is usually frozen from early December to late March, however, safe ice circulation is generally from mid-December to mid-March.

== Geography ==
The main hydrographic slopes near the "ruisseau à John" are:

- north side: Desprez Lake, Rivière à la Catin, Cami River, Brébeuf Lake, Saguenay River;
- east side: rivière à la Catin, Cami River, Malbaie River;
- South side: Malbaie River, Little Ha! Ha! Lake, Fleurigny Lake;
- west side: Lake Ha! Ha!, Ha! Ha! River, Huard Lake, Huard River.

The "ruisseau à John" has its source at the mouth of Lake Balis (length: 2.1 km (1.3 mi) altitude: 467 m (1,532 ft)) in a valley. The mouth of this lake is located at:

- 4.4 km (2.7 mi) southwest of the mouth of Desprez Lake;
- 3.3 km (2.1 mi) southeast of Charny Lake;
- 4.5 km (2.8 mi) east of Huard Lake;
- 6.8 km (4.2 mi) northwest of the confluence of the creek at John and the Malbaie River;
- 8.1 km (5.0 mi) east of the dam at the mouth of Lake Ha! Ha!;
- 49.4 km (30.7 mi) south-east of downtown Saguenay (city).

From its source, the stream of John Creek descends to 8.1 km (5.0 mi) in forested and mountainous areas, with a difference in elevation of 94 m (308 ft) according to the following segments:

- 0.7 km (0.43 mi) southeasterly in a concealed valley to the outlet (from the south) of Lac Fleurigny;
- 1.7 km (1.1 mi) east in a steep valley to the outlet (coming from the north) of Triangle Lake and Round Lake;
- 3.1 km (1.9 mi) eastwards in a valley through the crossing of Lac de l'Écluse (altitude: 427 m (1,401 ft)) on 0.4 km (0.25 mi), curving to the southeast to the outlet (coming from the northeast) of Desprez Lake;
- 0.9 km (0.56 mi) southeasterly by collecting the dump (coming from the north-west) of Cabane Lake, to the dump (coming from the northeast) from Little Lake to John;
- 1.7 km (1.1 mi) southeasterly in a steep valley, curving southward to its mouth.

The stream at John flows into a river bend on the north shore of the Malbaie River facing the northern limit of Hautes-Gorges-de-la-Rivière-Malbaie National Park. This confluence is located at:

- 3.8 km (2.4 mi) southeast of the mouth of Desprez Lake;
- 3.9 km (2.4 mi) southwest of the mouth of the head lake of the Cami River;
- 11.1 km (6.9 mi) southeast of Huard Lake;
- 12.2 km (7.6 mi) east of Lake Ha! Ha!;
- 38.0 km (23.6 mi) southeast of the mouth of the Ha! Ha! River (confluence with the Bay of Ha! Ha!);
- 18.8 km (11.7 mi) south of the mouth of Brébeuf Lake;
- 53.7 km (33.4 mi) northwest of the confluence of the Malbaie River and the St. Lawrence River;
- 56.1 km (34.9 mi) south-east of downtown Saguenay.

From the confluence of the stream at John, the current drops the course of the Malbaie River on 77.7 km (48.3 mi) to the east, south and south-east, which flows on the northwest shore of the St. Lawrence River.

== Toponymy ==
The toponym "ruisseau à John" was made official in June 1971 by the Commission de toponymie du Québec.

== See also ==
- Le Fjord-du-Saguenay Regional County Municipality
- Lalemant, an unorganized territory
- Hautes-Gorges-de-la-Rivière-Malbaie National Park.
- Zec du Lac-Brébeuf
- Malbaie River
- List of rivers of Quebec
