= Rivière à la Croix =

- Location within Quebec

Location
- Country: Canada
- Province: Quebec
- Region: Saguenay-Lac-Saint-Jean
- Regional County Municipality: Le Fjord-du-Saguenay Regional County Municipality
- Municipalities: Saint-Félix-d'Otis

Physical characteristics
- Source: Lac à la Croix
  - location: Saint-Félix-d'Otis
  - coordinates: 48.30987°N 70.57448°W
  - elevation: 202 m (663 ft)
- Mouth: Saguenay River
  - location: Saint-Félix-d'Otis
  - coordinates: 48.35278°N 70.65694°W
  - elevation: 4 m (13 ft)
- Length: 8.6 km (5.3 mi)
- Discharge
  - location: Saint-Félix-d'Otis

Basin features
- Tributaries
  - right: (from the mouth) Outlet of "lac à foin", outlet of "lac des Jules".

The Rivière à la Croix is a tributary of the Saguenay River, flowing in the municipality of Saint-Félix-d'Otis, in the Fjord-du-Saguenay, in the administrative region of Saguenay–Lac-Saint-Jean, in the province from Quebec, to Canada.

The valley of the "Rivière à la Croix" is served by the "Chemin de l'Anse aux érables" and the "chemin du lac à la Croix", for forestry, agriculture and recreational tourism. Some secondary forest roads serve this valley.

Forestry is the main economic activity in the sector; recreational tourism, second. This valley contains some dwellings distributed in small deforested areas.

The surface of the Rivière à la Croix is usually frozen from the beginning of December to the end of March, however safe circulation on the ice is generally done from mid-December to mid-March.

== Geography ==
The main watersheds neighboring the "Rivière à la Croix" are:

- north side: Lac au Sable, Saguenay River;
- east side: Saguenay River, Éternité River, Saint-Jean River;
- south side: Brébeuf Lake, Éternité Lake, Saint-Jean River;
- west side: Otis Lake, Saguenay River, Baie des Ha! Ha!, Ha! Ha! River.

The Rivière à la Croix rises at the mouth of lac à la Croix (length: 4.3 km (2.7 mi); maximum width: 0.7 km (0.43 mi); altitude: 202 m (663 ft)) between mountains. This lake is fed in particular by a few mountain streams including the outlet of Lake Pitre and Lake Rond, the outlet of Lac des Cœurs, the outlet of "Lac de la Sucrerie" and "Lac Mélasse" and the outlet of Lakes Sergerie and Wellie. This source of the watercourse is located at:

- 5.0 km (3.1 mi) south of the Saguenay River;
- 3.5 km (2.2 mi) north-east of Otis Lake;
- 7.9 km (4.9 mi) north-west of Éternity Lake;
- 8.2 km (5.1 mi) north of the Baie de la Sauvagesse du Brébeuf Lake;
- 7.8 km (4.8 mi) east of the confluence of the Rivière à la Croix and the Saguenay River (Anse à la Croix).

From the mouth of the lake, the course of the river at the Croix descends on 8.6 km (5.3 mi) with a drop of 198 m (650 ft), according to the following segments:

- 2.5 km (1.6 mi) towards the west in a deep valley, by collecting the discharge (coming from north) of the lake of Jules and Lake Eddy, until the discharge (coming from the north) of the lake at Hay and Sable Lake;
- 6.1 km (3.8 mi) to the west in a deep valley forming unmatched streamers, to the mouth.

The Rivière à la Croix flows on the south bank of the Saguenay River, ie in Anse à la Croix. This mouth is located at:

- 3.1 km (1.9 mi) south-east of the north shore of the Saguenay River;
- 15.5 km (9.6 mi) north-east of the confluence of the Ha! Ha! River And Baie des Ha! Ha!;
- 8.9 km (5.5 mi) north-west of the center of the hamlet of Lac-à-la-Croix (hamlet);
- 3.6 km (2.2 mi) north of Otis Lake;
- 31.4 km (19.5 mi) east of downtown Saguenay (city).

From the confluence of the Rivière à la Croix (in "Anse à la Croix"), the current follows the course of the Saguenay River on 79.7 km (49.5 mi) east to Tadoussac where it merges with the Saint Lawrence estuary.

== Toponymy ==
This toponym appears on a regional map dating from 1943 and on a draft map dating from 1959.

The toponym "Rivière à la Croix" was formalized on December 5, 1968, by the Commission de toponymie du Québec.

== Appendices ==
=== Related articles ===
- Le Fjord-du-Saguenay Regional County Municipality
- L'Anse-Saint-Jean, a municipality
- Lac à la Croix
- Saint-Jean River
- Saguenay River
- List of rivers of Quebec
