= Rivière des Cèdres =

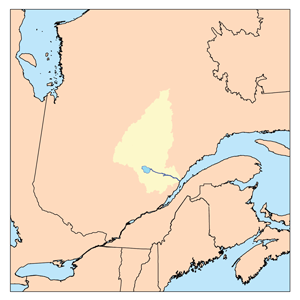

Location
- Country: Canada
- Province: Quebec
- Region: Saguenay–Lac-Saint-Jean
- Regional County Municipality: Le Fjord-du-Saguenay Regional County Municipality
- Municipality: Ferland-et-Boilleau

Physical characteristics
- Source: Lac des Cèdres
  - location: Ferland-et-Boilleau
  - coordinates: 48.03647°N 70.77247°W
  - elevation: 232 m (761 ft)
- Mouth: Ha! Ha! River
  - location: Ferland-et-Boilleau
  - coordinates: 48.12861°N 70.81528°W
  - elevation: 168 m (551 ft)
- Length: 4.1 km (2.5 mi)
- Discharge
  - location: Ferland-et-Boilleau

Basin features
- Tributaries
  - right: (upstream, from the mouth) Outlet of "lac à Doré", outlet of "lac de Camp" and of "lac Crève-Cheval".

The Rivière des Cèdres is a tributary of the Ha! Ha! River, flowing in the municipality of Ferland-et-Boilleau, in the Le Fjord-du-Saguenay Regional County Municipality, in the administrative region of Saguenay-Lac-Saint-Jean, in the province, in Quebec, in Canada.

The valley of the "Rivière des Cèdres" is indirectly served by the route 381 which runs along the course of the Ha! Ha! River and Lake Ha! Ha! for the needs of forestry, agriculture and recreational tourism. Some secondary forest roads serve this valley.

Forestry is the main economic activity in the sector; recreational tourism, second.

The surface of the Rivière des Cèdres is usually frozen from the beginning of December to the end of March, however the safe circulation on the ice is generally made from mid-December to mid-March.

== Geography ==
The main watersheds neighboring the Rivière des Cèdres are:

- north side: Crève-Cheval lake, "La Filée des Trois Petits Lacs", "Lac à la Poche outlet", Thomas lake, Saguenay River;
- East side: "Lac de la Quenouille", "Lac des Pins", "Lac des Îlets", Brébeuf Lake, Papinachois stream;
- south side: Ha! Ha! River, Lake Ha! Ha!, Lac Grand-Père, Huard River, Huard Lake, Charny Lake;
- west side: Ha! Ha! River, rivière à Mars, Bras d'Hamel, Bras Rocheux (Rocky arm).

The "Rivière des Cèdres" rises at the mouth of "lac des Cèdres" (length: 6.4 km (4.0 mi); width: 2.0 km (1.2 mi); altitude: 232 m (761 ft)). The mouth of this lake is located at:

- 17.9 km (11.1 mi) south-west of the mouth of Huard Lake;
- 1.5 km (0.93 mi) south of the mouth of "Lac Crève-Cheval";
- 20.2 km (12.6 mi) south of the dam at the mouth of Lake Ha! Ha! Which is crossed by the Ha! Ha! River;
- 1.2 km (0.75 mi) northwest of a mountain peak that reaches 329 m (1,079 ft);
- 3.3 km (2.1 mi) north-east of the confluence of the Rivière des Cèdres and the Ha! Ha! River.

From the dam at the mouth of "lac des Cèdres", the course of the "rivière des Cèdres" descends over 4.1 km (2.5 mi) according to the following segments:

- 0.5 km (0.31 mi) south-west, to a bay west of "Lac à Doré";
- 1.0 km (0.62 mi) crossing the "lac à Doré" (length: 2.0 km (1.2 mi); altitude: 2,227 km (1,384 mi)) towards the south-west and bending towards south-east to go around a mountain on the south shore of the lake, to its mouth. Note: "Lac à Doré" receives the discharge from a small marsh lake on the north side and the discharge from another lake on the southeast side;
- 2.6 km (1.6 mi) south-west in a deep valley, to its mouth.

The "Rivière des Cèdres" flows into a river curve on the east bank of the Ha! Ha! River. This mouth is located at:

- 1.1 km (0.68 mi) upstream of a dike on the Ha! Ha! River;
- 6.5 km (4.0 mi) south of the village center of Ferland;
- 5.1 km (3.2 mi) southwest of a bay in lac des Cèdres;
- 9.2 km (5.7 mi) south-east of the confluence of the Ha! Ha! River And Baie des Ha! Ha!;
- 19.1 km (11.9 mi) north-east of the dike on the Ha! Ha! River Located at the mouth of Lake Ha! Ha!;
- 27.6 km (17.1 mi) south-east of downtown Saguenay (city).

From the confluence of the "Rivière des Cèdres", the current follows the course of the Ha! Ha! River on 13.3 km (8.3 mi) generally towards the northeast, crosses Baie des Ha! Ha! on 11.0 km (6.8 mi) northeast, then follows the course of the Saguenay River on 99.5 km (61.8 mi) east to Tadoussac where it merges with the Saint Lawrence estuary.

== Toponymy ==
The toponym "Rivière des Cèdres" was formalized on December 5, 1968, by the Commission de toponymie du Québec.

== Notes and references ==
=== Related articles ===
- Le Fjord-du-Saguenay Regional County Municipality
- Ferland-et-Boilleau, a municipality
- Lac des Cèdres
- Ha! Ha! River
- Baie des Ha! Ha!
- Saguenay River
- List of rivers of Quebec
