= Petit lac Ha! Ha! =

Lake in Saguenay, in Quebec, Canada

Coordinates: 48.01111°N 70.79083°W

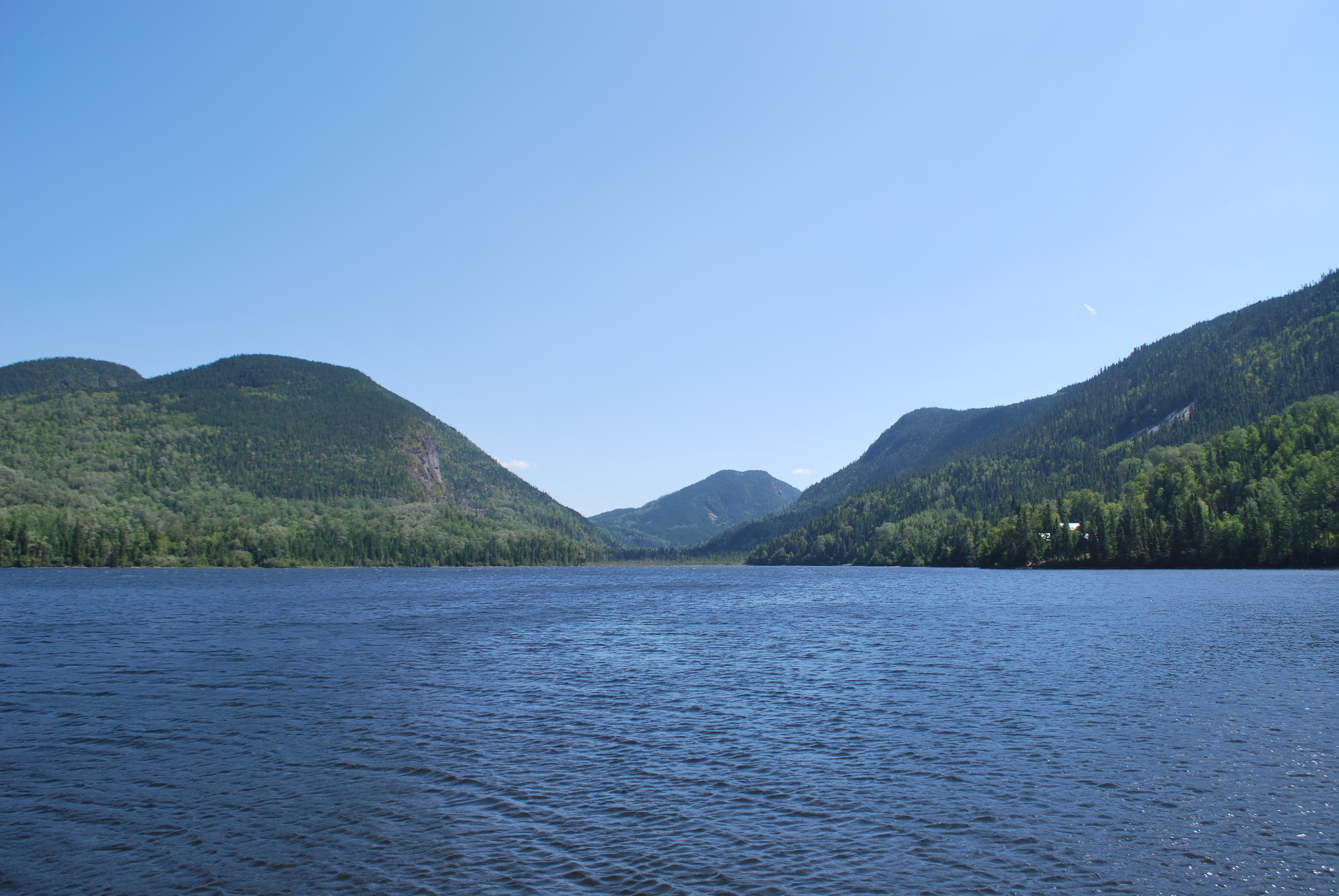
- Surroundings of the lake and view of the Mount Four

- Location within Quebec
- Location: Saguenay–Lac-Saint-Jean, Quebec / Le Fjord-du-Saguenay Regional County Municipality / Ferland-et-Boilleau, Quebec
- Type: Natural
- Primary inflows: Creek Quiscane (coming from North and extying lake Huard) and an unidentified creek (coming from east)
- Primary outflows: Lake Ha! Ha!
- Basin countries: Canada
- Max. length: 4.9 km (3.0 mi)
- Max. width: 1.2 km (0.75 mi)
- Surface elevation: 381 m (1,250 ft)
- Settlements: Ferland-et-Boilleau, Quebec

Petit lac Ha! Ha! (French: Petit lac Ha! Ha!, pronounced [pəti lak a a]) is a freshwater lake in the Ferland-et Boilleau municipality, in the administrative region of Saguenay-Lac-Saint-Jean, in the province of Quebec, in Canada. It is located on the east side of Lake Ha! Ha! into which it drains.

The southern portion of the lake is served by Route 381, which cuts the lake at the peninsula attached to the north shore, then heads northwest to the Northwestern part of Lake Ha! Ha!.

Forestry is the main economic activity of the sector, followed by recreational tourism.

The surface of Petit lac Ha! Ha! is usually frozen from late November to early April. The ice shelf is generally thick enough to allow safe passage from mid-December to late March.

== Geography ==
This lake is located at 2.6 kilometres (1.6 mi) south-west of the summit (altitude: 822 metres (2,697 ft)) of the Mount Four.

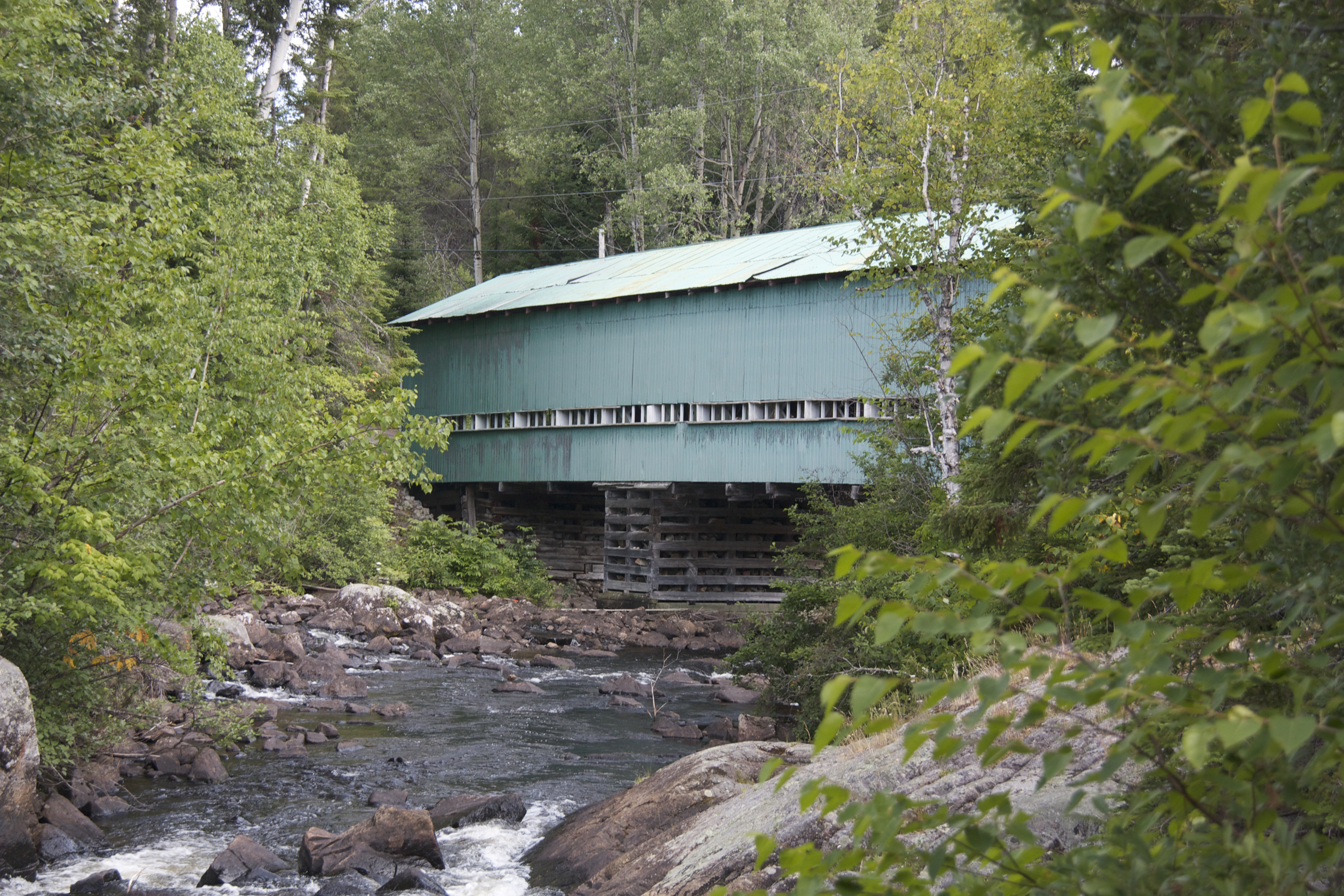
Pont du lac Ha! Ha! (Bridge of lake Ha! Ha!), separating the Lake Ha! Ha! and Petit lac Ha! Ha!.

The main hydrographic slopes near Petit lac Ha! Ha! are:

- north side: Quiscale Creek, Huard Lake, Cedar River, Cedar Lake, Otis Lake;
- east side: Malbaie River, Cabin Creek;
- south side: Malbaie River, Michta Lake, Ha! Ha! River, Cruche River, Barley River;
- west side: Rivière à Pierre, Ha! Ha! River, Lake Ha! Ha!, Rivière à Mars.

Petit lac Ha! Ha! has a length of 4.9 kilometres (3.0 mi) between the surrounding mountains, forming a southward hook at the western end of Lake Ha! Ha!. Its maximum width is 1.2 kilometres (0.75 mi); its altitude is 381 metres (1,250 ft); and its area is . Petit lac Ha! Ha! is fed by the Quiscane stream (coming from the North and draining the Huard lake) and by an unidentified stream flowing from the east. This lake includes the Canots Cove (west side), Creuse Bay (South Shore) and Lambert Bay (South Shore).

The mouth of the lake is located at:

- 5.4 kilometres (3.4 mi) southeast of the mouth of Lake Ha! Ha!;
- 8.2 kilometres (5.1 mi) south of the village center of Boileau, Quebec;
- 5.8 kilometres (3.6 mi) south of Huard Lake;
- 33.6 kilometres (20.9 mi) southeast of the confluence of the Ha! Ha! River and the Bay of Ha! Ha!;
- 49.1 kilometres (30.5 mi) south-east of downtown Saguenay city;
- 69.7 kilometres (43.3 mi) north-west of downtown Baie-Saint-Paul.

From the bridge separating the two lakes, the current flows through Lake Ha! Ha! on 6.8 kilometres (4.2 mi) northwesterly to the dam at its mouth, then the stream successively descends the Ha! Ha! River on 34.8 kilometres (21.6 mi) to the northwest, across the Bay of Ha! Ha! on 10.7 kilometres (6.6 mi) northeasterly, then go east on the Saguenay River on 87 kilometres (54 mi) to Tadoussac where this last river flows into the St. Lawrence River.

== Toponymy ==
The toponym "Petit lac Ha! Ha!" is linked to the lake, the river and the bay of the same name. The specific term "Ha! Ha!" has several possible interpretations. One popular interpretation associates it with an exclamation indicating irony or onomatopoeia of laughter.

However, the name probably comes from an alteration of a Montagnais toponym almost unpronounceable in French, which in Algonquin means a place where bark is exchanged. This is similar to the etymology of the Baie des Ha! Ha!, also part of the Saguenay River basin.

According to some historians, this specific is derived from the French word ha-ha meaning "an unexpected obstacle on a path".

Additionally, the recollect Gabriel Sagard (baptized Théodat) published the Dictionary of the Huron Language (Paris, 1632), listing the noun Háhattey, meaning "road, lane or address".

The toponym "Petit lac Ha! Ha!" was made official on December 5, 1968 by the Commission de toponymie du Québec.

== See also ==
- Le Fjord-du-Saguenay Regional County Municipality, a RCM
- Ferland-et-Boilleau, Quebec, a municipality
- Lake Ha! Ha!
