= Lac des Cèdres =

Lake in Ferland-et-Boilleau, Quebec, Canada

- Location in Quebec
- Location: Ferland-et-Boilleau and Saint-Félix-d'Otis
- Coordinates: 48.24°N 70.74445°W
- Lake type: Natural
- Primary inflows: lac de camp (North side), « La Filée des Trois Petits Lacs » (North side) lac Barbé (North side), lac de la Grenouille (East side), lac Gamelin (South side), lac Murphy (South side)
- Primary outflows: Rivière des Cèdres
- Basin countries: Canada
- Max. length: 6.4 km (4.0 mi)
- Max. width: 2.0 km (1.2 mi)
- Surface elevation: 232 m (761 ft)

The "Lac des Cèdres" is the head of the Rivière des Cèdres, in the watershed of Ha! Ha! River And Saguenay River. This body of water straddles the municipality of Ferland-et-Boilleau and Saint-Félix-d'Otis, in the Fjord-du-Saguenay, in the administrative region of Saguenay–Lac-Saint-Jean, in province of Quebec, in Canada.

A few secondary forest roads allow access to the Lac des Cèdres watershed; these roads connect to route 381 (north-south direction) which runs along the Ha! Ha! River. These roads allow forestry and recreational tourism activities.

Forestry is the main economic activity in the sector; recreational tourism, second.

The surface of Lac des Cèdres is usually frozen from the beginning of December to the end of March, however the safe circulation on the ice is generally made from mid-December to mid-March.

== Geography ==
Lac des Cèdres is located about 25.1 km (15.6 mi) north of the boundary of the administrative regions of Saguenay-Lac-Saint-Jean. The main hydrographic slopes near Lac des Cèdres are:

- north side: Camp Lake, Crève-Cheval Lake, Barbé Lake, Long Lake, Goth Lake, Otis Lake, Saguenay River;
- east side: Grenouille lake, Quenouilles lake, Papinachois stream, Bras de Ross, Brébeuf Lake (Saint-Jean River tributary), Saint-Jean River, Cami River, rivière à la Catin;
- south side: Murphy lake, Papinachois stream, Ha! Ha! River, Lake Ha! Ha!, Malbaie River;
- west side: Ha! Ha! River, Lake Ha! Ha!, Mars river, Hamel's arm.

The "Lac des Cèdres" has a length of 6.4 km (4.0 mi) in the shape of a deformed starfish, a maximum width of 2.0 km (1.2 mi), an altitude is 232 km (144 mi) and an area of . It is fed by the camp lake (north side), "La Filée des Trois Petits Lacs" (north side), Lac Barbé (north side), "Lac de la Grenouille" (east side), Lac Gamelin (south side) and Murphy Lake (south side). Its mouth is located to the northwest, at:

- 3.3 km (2.1 mi) north-east of the confluence of the Rivière des Cèdres and Ha! Ha! River;
- 8.6 km (5.3 mi) north of the village center of Ferland in the municipality of Ferland-et-Boilleau;
- 9.7 km (6.0 mi) south-east of the confluence of the Ha! Ha! River And Baie des Ha! Ha!.
- 20.4 km (12.7 mi) south-east of the dam at the mouth of Lake Ha! Ha! which is crossed by the Ha! Ha! River;
- 29.0 km (18.0 mi) south-east of downtown Saguenay (city);
- 38.7 km (24.0 mi) south of the Saguenay River.

From the mouth of "Lac des Cèdres", the current:

- descends the course of the Rivière des Cèdres on 4.1 km (2.5 mi) towards the northwest;
- descends the course of the Ha! Ha! River on 13.3 km (8.3 mi) towards the northwest;
- crosses the Baie des Ha! Ha! on 11 km (6.8 mi) towards the northeast;
- descends the course of the Saguenay River over 93.1 km (57.8 mi) east to Tadoussac where the latter river flows into the Saint Lawrence River.

== Toponymy ==
The toponym "lac des Cèdres" was formalized on December 12, 1985, by the Commission de toponymie du Québec.

== See also ==
- Le Fjord-du-Saguenay Regional County Municipality
- Ferland-et-Boilleau, a municipality
- Saint-Félix-d'Otis, a municipality
- Rivière des Cèdres
- Baie des Ha! Ha!
- Saguenay River
