= Bridge of Ha! Ha! Lake =

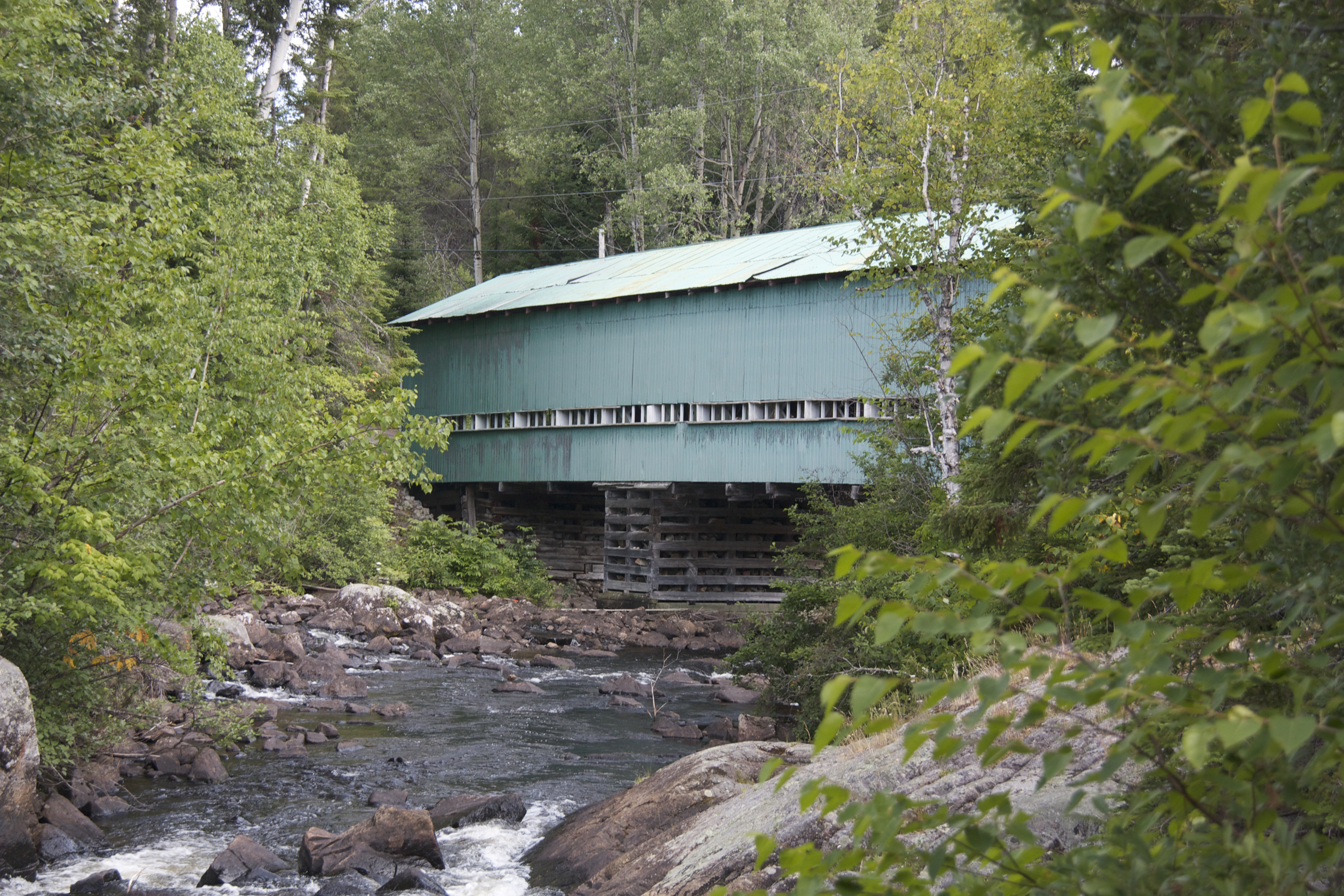
- Bridge of Ha! Ha! Lake
- Coordinates: 48.066738°N 70.824115°W
- Crosses: Lake Ha! Ha!
- Locale: Ferland-et-Boilleau

Characteristics
- Design: Covered bridge
- Total length: 37.11 metres (121.8 ft)
- Width: 6.43 metres (21.1 ft)

History
- Opened: 1934; 92 years ago

Location
- Interactive map of Bridge of Ha! Ha! Lake

The Bridge of Ha! Ha! Lake is a covered bridge that spans the Ha! Ha! River. It measures 37 metres (121 ft) long and 3.66 metres (12.0 ft) high. It is the only covered bridge in Quebec with corrugated iron paneling.

== History ==
The bridge was built in 1934.

The covered bridge was designated as a heritage site along with the adjacent rest area by the Municipality of Ferland-et-Boilleau on September 12, 2011.

As of August 1, 2015, the bridge is closed to traffic.

== Toponymy ==
The name of Ha! Ha! refers to the river and lake of the same name.

== Color ==
The bridge is currently green with white moldings. It was formerly white with red moldings.

== Bibliography ==
- "Pont du Lac-Ha! Ha!". Commission de toponymie du Québec. Bank of place names from Quebec.
- "Pont du Lac-Ha! Ha !, Ferland-et-Boilleau". Ministry of Transport of Quebec Government. Covered bridges.
