= Rivière à Pierre (Ha! Ha! River tributary) =

- Location within Quebec

Location
- Country: Canada
- Province: Quebec
- Region: Capitale-Nationale and Saguenay-Lac-Saint-Jean
- Regional County Municipality: Charlevoix Regional County Municipality and Le Fjord-du-Saguenay Regional County Municipality
- Municipalities: Ferland-et-Boilleau

Physical characteristics
- Source: Girard Lake
  - location: Laurentides Wildlife Reserve
  - coordinates: 47.96085°N 70.94485°W
  - elevation: 668 m (2,192 ft)
- Mouth: Lake Ha! Ha!
  - location: Ferland-et-Boilleau
  - coordinates: 48.05°N 70.85056°W
  - elevation: 498 m (1,634 ft)
- Length: 19.8 km (12.3 mi)
- Discharge
  - location: Ferland-et-Boilleau

Basin features
- Tributaries
  - right: Outlet of "lac Légal".

The rivière à Pierre (English: Pierre's River) is a stream flowing in Quebec, in Canada. It crosses the administrative regions of:

- Capitale-Nationale: the Charlevoix Regional County Municipality, in the Laurentides Wildlife Reserve;
- Saguenay–Lac-Saint-Jean: the Le Fjord-du-Saguenay Regional County Municipality, in the municipality Ferland-et-Boilleau.

The "rivière à Pierre" river valley is served by some forest roads for the needs of forestry and recreational tourism activities. Forestry is the main economic activity in the sector; recreational tourism, second.

The surface of the "Rivière à Pierre" is usually frozen from the beginning of December to the end of March, however the safe circulation on the ice is generally done from mid-December to mid-March.

== Geography ==
The main watersheds neighboring the "Rivière à Pierre" are:

- north side: Ha! Ha! River, Bras d'Hamel, Bras de Coco, Bras Rocheux, Saguenay River;
- east side: Cinto lake, Ha! Ha! River, Cruche River, Lake Ha! Ha!, Malbaie River;
- south side: rivière à Mars, Rivière à Mars North-West, Goéland Lake, Goéland stream, rivière du Chemin des Canots, Porc-Épic River;
- west side: Bras du Diable, rivière à Mars, rivière à Mars North-West.

The "rivière à Pierre" rises at the mouth of Girard Lake (altitude: 668 m (2,192 ft)) in the Laurentides Wildlife Reserve. This source is located at:

- 1.4 km (0.87 mi) north-east of a curve of the rivière à Mars;
- 4.5 km (2.8 mi) north-west of Lake Cinto;
- 12.2 km (7.6 mi) southwest of the confluence of the "rivière à Pierre" and Lake Ha! Ha!;
- 40.1 km (24.9 mi) south of the confluence of Lake Ha! Ha! and the mouth of the Baie des Ha! Ha!;

From its source (Girard Lake), the course of the "rivière à Pierre" flows over 19.8 km (12.3 mi) according to the following segments:

- 0.4 km (0.25 mi) east in the Laurentides Wildlife Reserve to a bend in the river;
- 5.0 km (3.1 mi) northwards following the foot of a high mountain and crossing "Lac à Pierre" (length: 0.7 km (0.43 mi); altitude: 593 m (1,946 ft)), then northeasterly to the northern limit of the Laurentides Wildlife Reserve;
- 0.8 km (0.50 mi) north-east in the municipality of Ferland-et-Boilleau in a deep valley, to the outlet (coming from the north-west) of a lake;
- 3.4 km (2.1 mi) north to the outlet (coming from the southeast) of "Legal Lake";
- 2.1 km (1.3 mi) north to the outlet (from the northwest) of a lake;
- 4.6 km (2.9 mi) north-east in a steep valley, to a bend in the river corresponding to the outlet (from the north-west) of a lake;
- 3.5 km (2.2 mi) south-east to its mouth.

The Pierre river flows into a small bay on the west shore of Lake Ha! Ha!. This mouth is located at:

- 2.6 km (1.6 mi) southwest of the dam at the mouth of Lake Ha! Ha!;
- 5.6 km (3.5 mi) south of the village center of Boileau in the municipality of Ferland-et-Boilleau;
- 30.0 km (18.6 mi) south-east of the confluence of the Ha! Ha! River and the Baie des Ha! Ha!;
- 44.7 km (27.8 mi) south-east of downtown Saguenay (city);
- 85.0 km (52.8 mi) south-west of the confluence of the Saguenay River and the Saint Lawrence River.

From the confluence of the "rivière à Pierre" and Lake Ha! Ha!, the current follows the course of the Ha! Ha! River on 38.9 km (24.2 mi) generally towards the north, crosses the Baie des Ha! Ha! on 11.0 km (6.8 mi) towards the northeast, then follows the course of the Saguenay River on 99.5 km (61.8 mi) towards the east until Tadoussac where it merges with the Saint Lawrence Estuary.

== Toponymy ==
The toponym "Rivière à Pierre" was formalized on December 5, 1968, by the Commission de toponymie du Québec.

== See also ==
- Le Fjord-du-Saguenay Regional County Municipality
- Laurentides Wildlife Reserve
- Charlevoix Regional County Municipality
- Ferland-et-Boilleau
- Ha! Ha! River
- Saguenay River
- List of rivers of Quebec
