= Lac à la Croix (rivière à la Croix) =

Lake in Saint-Félix-d'Otis, Quebec, Canada

- Location in Quebec
- Location: Saint-Félix-d'Otis
- Coordinates: 48.30139°N 70.56694°W
- Lake type: Natural
- Primary inflows: A few streams including the outlet of Lac Pitre and Lac Rond, the outlet of "Lac des Cœurs", the outlet of "Lac de la Sucrerie" and Lac Mélasse, as well as the outlet of Lakes Sergerie and Wellie.
- Primary outflows: Rivière à la Croix
- Basin countries: Canada
- Max. length: 4.3 km (2.7 mi)
- Max. width: 0.7 km (0.43 mi)
- Surface elevation: 202 m (663 ft)

The lac à la Croix is a body of water in the watershed of the rivière à la Croix and the Saint Jean River. This body of water is located in the municipality of Saint-Félix-d'Otis, in the Le Fjord-du-Saguenay Regional County Municipality, in the region administrative Saguenay–Lac-Saint-Jean, in the province of Quebec, in Canada.

The "Chemin du Lac-à-la-Croix" provides access to the "Lac à la Croix" watershed for forestry and recreational tourism activities.

Forestry is the main economic activity in the sector; recreational tourism, second.

The surface of Lac à la Croix is usually frozen from the beginning of December to the end of March, however the safe circulation on the ice is generally made from mid-December to mid-March.

== Geography ==
The mouth of Lac à la Croix is located about 4.8 km (3.0 mi) north of the boundary of the administrative regions of Saguenay–Lac-Saint-Jean and Capitale-Nationale. The main watersheds near "Lac à la Croix" are:

- north side: Lac au Sable, Saguenay River;
- east side: Potvin lake, Bornes lake, Arvida lake, Benouche stream, Éternité River, Saint-Jean River;
- south side: "Lac des Coeurs", Cazot Lake, Nazaire stream, Éternité Lake;
- west side: Otis Lake, Rivière à la Croix, Cailles stream, Saguenay River, Baie des Ha! Ha!.

The "Lac à la Croix" has a length of 4.3 km (2.7 mi) in the shape of a cucumber star, a maximum width of 0.7 km (0.43 mi), an altitude is 202 m (663 ft) and an area of . This lake is fed in particular by a few mountain streams including the outlet of Lake Pitre and Lake Rond, the outlet of Lac des Cœurs, the outlet of "Lac de la Sucrerie" and Lac Mélasse and the outlet of Lakes Sergerie and Wellie. This lake has a narrow bay stretching 1.7 km (1.1 mi) to the east. Its mouth is located at the bottom of a small northwest bay, at:

- 2.6 km (1.6 mi) south of Sable Lake;
- 3.5 km (2.2 mi) north-east of Anse à Pierre du Otis Lake;
- 5.0 km (3.1 mi) south of Anse aux Érables located on the south bank of the Saguenay River;
- 7.8 km (4.8 mi) north-west of Éternité Lake;
- 7.8 km (4.8 mi) east of the confluence of the Rivière à la Croix and the Saguenay River;
- 8.3 km (5.2 mi) north of Brébeuf Lake;
- 38.5 km (23.9 mi) east of downtown Saguenay (city).

From the confluence of Lac à la Croix, the current follows the course of:

- the Rivière à la Croix on 8.6 km (5.3 mi) to the west;
- the Saguenay River on 79.7 km (49.5 mi) eastward to Tadoussac where it merges with the Saint Lawrence estuary.

== Toponymy ==
The toponym "Lac à la Croix" was formalized on December 5, 1968, by the Commission de toponymie du Québec.

== See also ==
- Le Fjord-du-Saguenay Regional County Municipality
- Saint-Félix-d'Otis, a municipality
- Rivière à la Croix
- Saguenay River
