= Boileau, Quebec =

Boileau
- Municipality
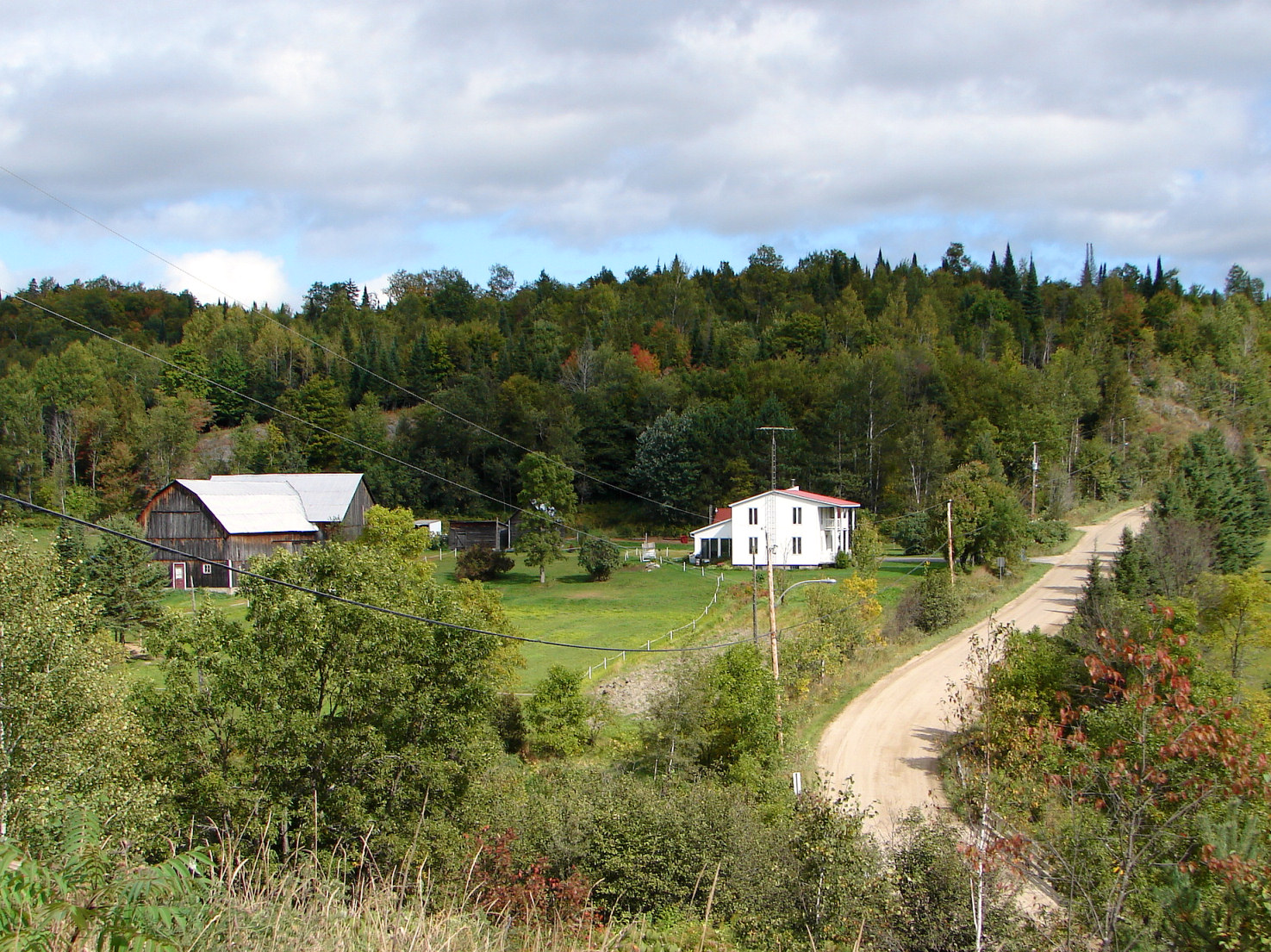
- Rural sector of Boileau

- Coat of arms

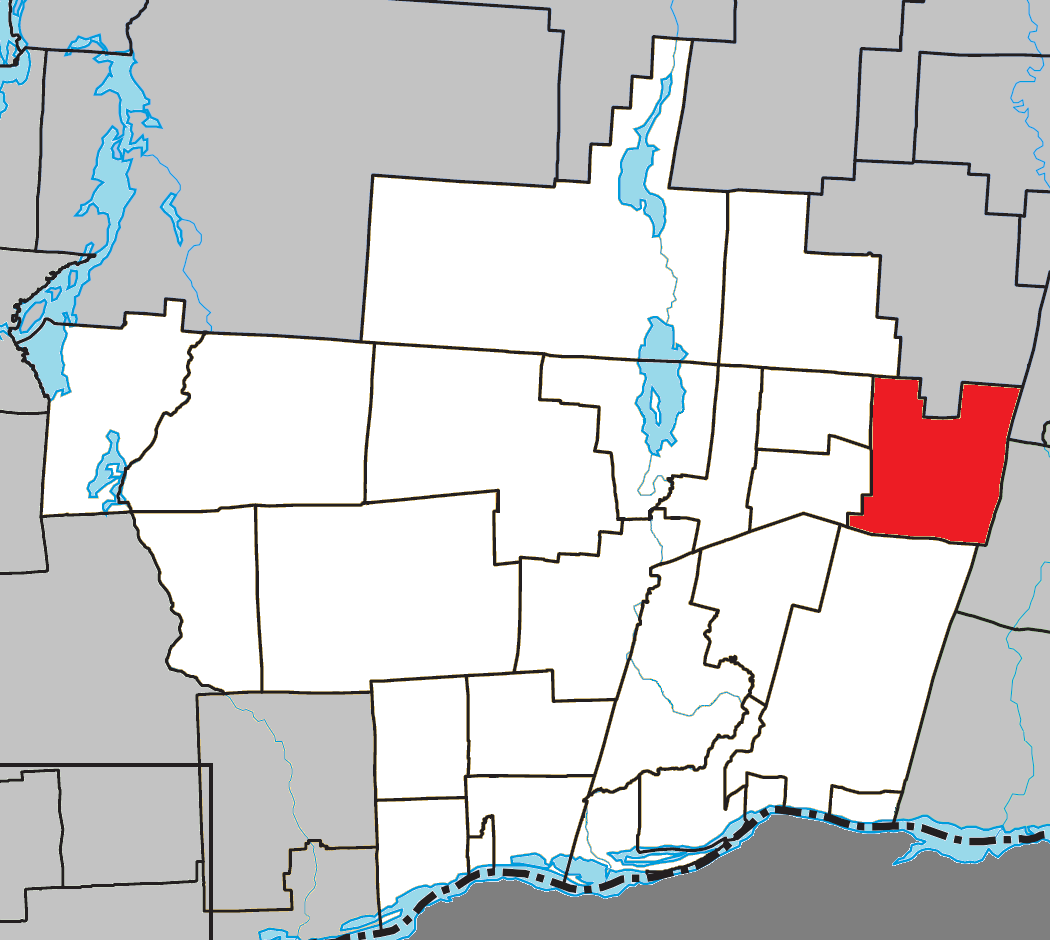
- Location within Papineau RCM

- Location in western Quebec
- Coordinates: 45°55′N 74°46′W
- Country: Canada
- Province: Quebec
- Region: Outaouais
- RCM: Papineau
- Constituted: March 8, 1882

Government
  - Mayor: Serge Béchard
  - Fed. riding: Argenteuil—La Petite-Nation
  - Prov. riding: Papineau

Area
  - Total: 140.93 km^{2} (54.41 sq mi)
  - Land: 134.08 km^{2} (51.77 sq mi)

Population (2021)
  - Total: 405
  - Density: 3/km^{2} (7.8/sq mi)
  - Change 2016-21: ▲20.9%
  - Dwellings: 406
- Time zone: UTC−5 (EST)
  - Summer (DST): UTC−4 (EDT)
- Postal code: J0V 1N0
- Area code(s): 819
- Highways: No major routes
- Website: boileau.ca

Boileau (French pronunciation: [bwalo]) is a village and municipality in the Outaouais region of Quebec, Canada, part of the Papineau Regional County Municipality. The municipality was known as Ponsonby until 1993.

== History ==
The area was first named Ponsonby on the Gale and Duberger map of 1795. In all likelihood, it was named after a town in Cumberland County, England. It is also possible that it was named in honour of any of several noted persons called Ponsonby, including the Postmaster General of Canada of 1784, William Ponsonby (1744–1806).

Settlers were attracted to the area by the nature's beauty and resources. They were generally from Ireland and England, or the nearby villages of Calumet and Grenville. In 1876, the Township of Ponsonby was proclaimed. In 1880, the Parish of Sainte-Valérie was formed, and a year later the Boileau post office opened, named after the first postmaster, Perpetus Poissant dit Boileau. In 1882, the Township Municipality of Ponsonby was established.

Because the village was better known as Boileau and Ponsonby was limited to purely administrative use, the municipal authorities, with the support of the majority of the population, were granted the official name change from Ponsonby to Boileau in 1993.

== Geography ==
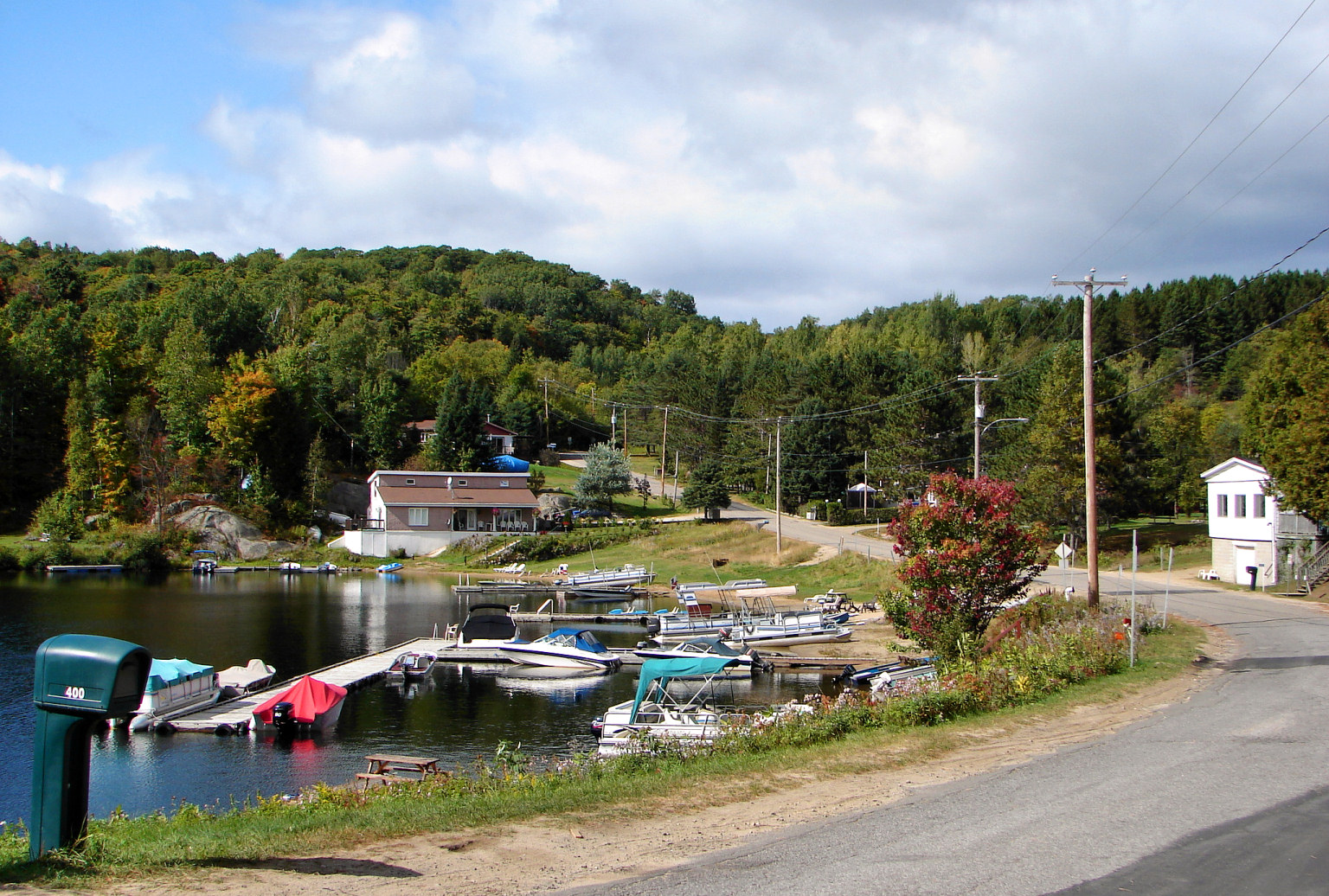
Little marina on the north end of Lake Papineau.

About 30 kilometers (19 mi) north of Montebello, the municipality is characterized by a relief ranging from 182 meters (597 ft) at Philisson Creek to 381 meters (1,250 ft) at the summit of Mont du Cimetière (Mount Cemetery). Sparsely populated, inhabited areas are the hamlets of Brookdale and Boileau and also around the Maskinongé Bay and Loup, Champagneur, and Cross Lakes. Distance of Montreal is 155 km, and Quebec is 402 km, both are major cities of Canada.

== Demographics ==
=== Population ===
Canada census – Boileau community profile

	2021	2016	2011
Population	405 (+20.9% from 2016)	335 (-11.8% from 2011)	380 (-23.8% from 2006)
Land area	134.08 km^{2} (51.77 sq mi)	136.33 km^{2} (52.64 sq mi)	136.50 km^{2} (52.70 sq mi)
Population density	3/km^{2} (7.8/sq mi)	2.5/km^{2} (6.5/sq mi)	2.8/km^{2} (7.3/sq mi)
Median age	57.6 (M: 57.6, F: 56.4)	51.2 (M: 50.0, F: 52.6)	52.9 (M: 52.4, F: 53.7)
Private dwellings	406 (total) 199 (occupied)	407 (total)	425 (total)
Median household income	$54,400	$43,392	$46,038

References: 2021 2016 2011

Historical census populations

Year	Pop.	±%
1891	301	—
1901	452	+50.2%
1911	547	+21.0%
1921	643	+17.6%
1931	546	−15.1%
1941	547	+0.2%
1951	432	−21.0%

Year	Pop.	±%
1956	325	−24.8%
1961	256	−21.2%
1966	226	−11.7%
1971	194	−14.2%
1976	186	−4.1%
1981	183	−1.6%
1986	212	+15.8%

Year	Pop.	±%
1991	217	+2.4%
1996	228	+5.1%
2001	220	−3.5%
2006	499	+126.8%
2011	380	−23.8%
2016	335	−11.8%
2021	405	+20.9%

Source: Statistics Canada

=== Language ===
Mother tongue language (2021)

Language	Population	Pct (%)
French only	335	82.7%
English only	55	13.6%
Both English & French	10	2.5%
Other languages	5	1.2%

== Government ==
List of former mayors:

- Henri Gariépy (...–2017)
- Robert Meyer (2017–2021)
- Jean-Marc Chevalier (2021–2025)
- Serge Béchard (2025–present)

== Education ==
Sir Wilfrid Laurier School Board operates English-language schools:

- Arundel Elementary School in Arundel
- Laurentian Regional High School in Lachute

French language schools are operated by Centre de services scolaire des Laurentides:

- École L'Arc-en-Ciel in Boileau

== See also ==
- List of anglophone communities in Quebec
