= Ha! Ha! River (Saguenay River tributary) =

Tributary of Saguenay, Quebec (Canada)

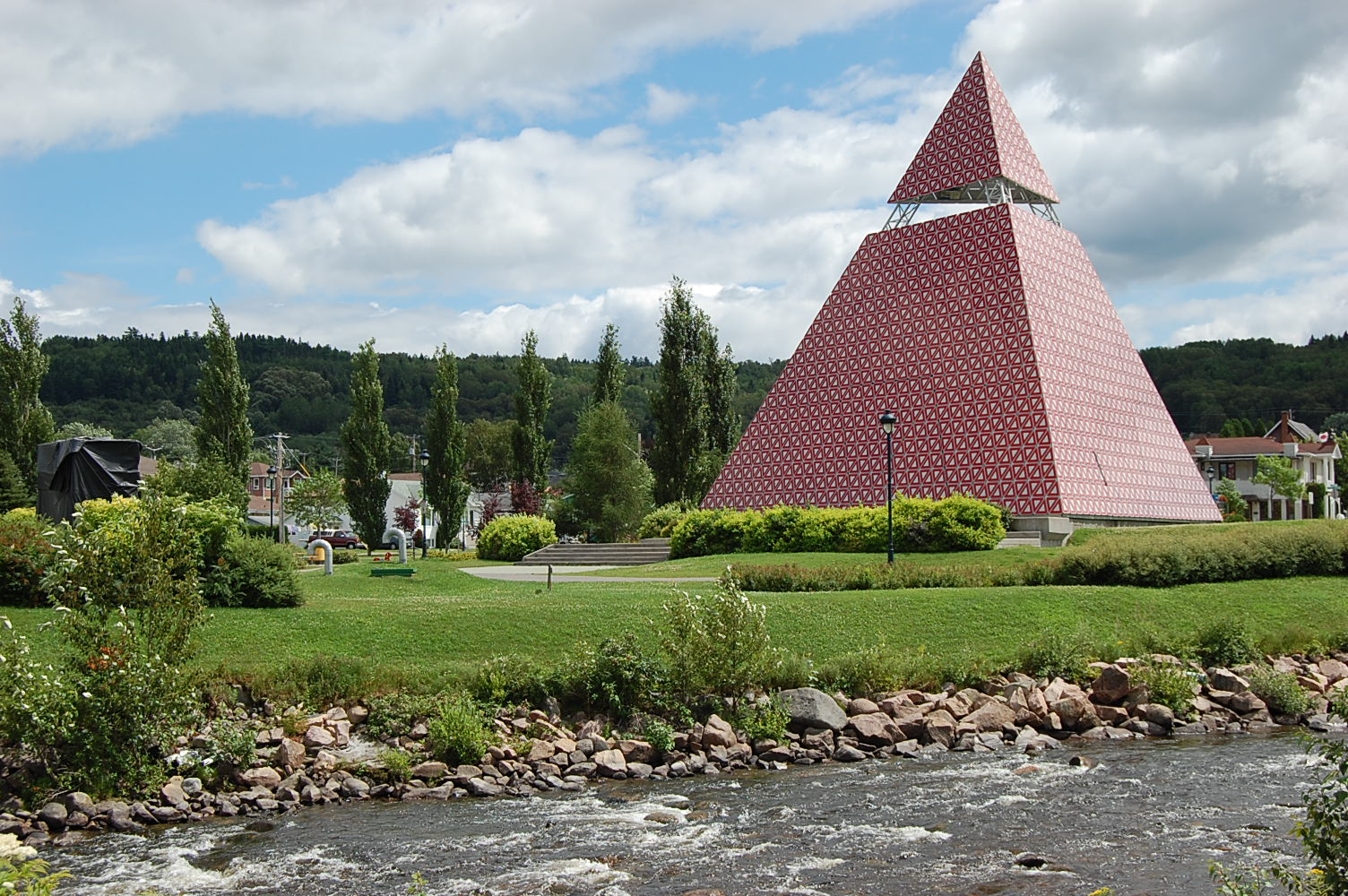

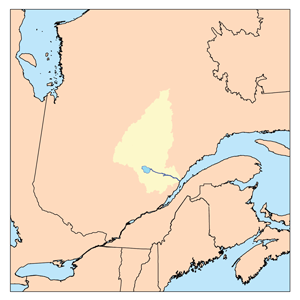

Location
- Country: Canada
- Province: Quebec
- Region: Saguenay–Lac-Saint-Jean
- Regional County Municipality: Le Fjord-du-Saguenay Regional County Municipality
- City and protected area: Laurentides Wildlife Reserve, Ferland-et-Boilleau, Quebec, Saguenay, Quebec

Physical characteristics
- Source: Mountain and Forest streams
  - location: Laurentides Wildlife Reserve
  - coordinates: 47°51′19″N 70°51′07″W
  - elevation: 780 m (2,560 ft)
- Mouth: Saguenay River (via Baie des Ha! Ha!)
  - location: Saguenay, Quebec, a city
  - coordinates: 48°19′04″N 70°51′35″W
  - elevation: 4 m (13 ft)
- Length: 80.5 km (50.0 mi)
- Discharge
  - location: Saguenay, Quebec

Basin features
- Tributaries
  - left: (upstream from the mouth) Forcade stream, ruisseau le Savanier, outlet of lac de la Savane, Bras d'Hamel, outlet of lake Edgar, outlet of lac à Louis-Potvin, outlet of unidentified lakes, rivière à Pierre (via lake Ha! Ha!), outlet of lake Opmecho, outlet of lake Rastoulle and lake Globule, outlet of lakes Safran et Pé, outlet of lake Loups-Cerviers, outlet of lake Pilote.
  - right: (upstream, from the mouth) Ruisseau Price, décharge du lac Bergeron, décharge du lac à Bois, rivière des Cèdres, outlet of lake Grand-Père, outlet of lake Grand-Mère, Huard River, outlet of petit lac Ha! Ha! (via lake Ha! Ha!), outlet of lake Droux, outlet of lake Arconet, outlet of lake Ménard.

The Ha! Ha! River (French: rivière Ha! Ha!, pronounced [ʁivjɛʁ a a]) is a watercourse in Saguenay–Lac-Saint-Jean, Quebec, Canada.

Its course is entirely located in Saguenay-Lac-Saint-Jean, in the Dubuc provincial constituency and the federal district of Chicoutimi-Le Fjord. The river is shared between the MRC of Le Fjord-du-Saguenay Regional County Municipality (through the town of Ferland-et-Boilleau, Quebec) and the city of Saguenay crossing the La Baie, Quebec borough of Saguenay.

The Ha! Ha! River was severely affected during the Saguenay Flood.

The southern part of Petit lac Ha! Ha! is served by Route 381 to the bridge that marks out the Petit lac Ha! Ha! and Lake Ha! Ha!. This bridge spans the water level at the peninsula attached to the North Shore, then the road heads northwest, serving the northwestern part of the lake Ha! Ha! and the lower part of the Ha! Ha! River Valley.

Forestry is the main economic activity of the sector; recreational tourism activities, second; agriculture is practiced around the lower segment of the river to the urban area (Grande-Baie sector).

The surface of Ha! Ha! River is usually frozen from early December to late March, however, safe ice circulation is generally from mid-December to mid-March.

== Geography ==
The main hydrographic slopes near the "Ha! Ha! River" are:

- North side: Baie des Ha! Ha!, Saguenay River;
- East side: Huard Lake, Huard River, rivière des Cèdres, Brébeuf Lake, Éternité Lake, Cazin River, Malbaie River;
- South side: Chemin des Canots River, Porc-Épic River;
- West side: rivière à Pierre, rivière à Mars, rivière à Mars North-West.

The "Ha! Ha! river" originates at the confluence of forest streams at an elevation of 780 metres (2,560 ft) in the Laurentides Wildlife Reserve. This source is located at:

- 0.7 kilometres (0.43 mi) northeast of a curve of the Chemin des Canots River;
- 4.6 kilometres (2.9 mi) northeast of a curve of the rivière à Mars;
- 6.2 kilometres (3.9 mi) west of the course of the Malbaie River;
- 14.1 kilometres (8.8 mi) southwest of lac des Martres;
- 18.6 kilometres (11.6 mi) southeast of the confluence of the "Ha! Ha! River" and from Lake Ha! Ha!;
- 53 kilometres (33 mi) southeast of the confluence of the "Ha! Ha! River" and the Baie of Ha! Ha!;

From its source, the "Ha! Ha! River" flows over 80.5 kilometres (50.0 mi) according to the following segments:

Upper course of the Ha! Ha! River (segment of 41.6 kilometres (25.8 mi))

- 8.2 kilometres (5.1 mi) northerly forming a hook to the east at the beginning of the segment until the discharge (from the east) of Lac Ménard;
- 4.2 kilometres (2.6 mi) to the north, forming some serpentines at the beginning of segments in a steep valley, to the outlet (coming from the west) of the Lac des Loups-Cerviers and the Petit Lac des Loups-Cerviers;
- 8.8 kilometres (5.5 mi) northerly in a confined valley collecting the outlet (coming from the east) of Arconet Lake and the discharge (coming from the west) of Globule and Ratoulle lakes, crossing the Viper Lake and forming a hook of 0.4 kilometres (0.25 mi) towards the west at the end of the segment, to the outlet (coming from the west) of Cinto Lake;
- 5.4 kilometres (3.4 mi) north to the south shore of lake Ha! Ha! (at the tip of a small peninsula);
- 6.6 kilometres (4.1 mi) northwesterly across the Lake Ha! Ha! (length: 7.0 kilometres (4.3 mi); width: 1.4 kilometres (0.87 mi); altitude: 379 metres (1,243 ft)) to the dam at its mouth.

Lower course of the Ha! Ha! River (segment of 38.9 kilometres (24.2 mi))

From the dike of Lake Ha! Ha! at 379 metres (1,243 ft) altitude, in the locality of Boileau and the course of the river flows along the route 381, according to the following segments:

- 0.8 kilometres (0.50 mi) northeasterly across several rapids and cutting across route 381 to a river bend, corresponding to the confluence of the second outfall from Lake Ha! Ha! and to an island;
- 9.0 kilometres (5.6 mi) to the north by collecting four streams (from the west), including the Louis-Potvin lake discharge, and passing the villages of Boilleau and Ferland-et-Boilleau, and crossing the "lac à Bélanger", to the confluence of the Huard River (coming from the southeast);
- 15.8 kilometres (9.8 mi) northerly collecting the outlet (coming from the east) of Castor Lake, Belle Truite and Little Lake; the outlet (coming from the southwest) of Edgar Lake; the outlet (coming from the southeast) of Grand-Mère Lake, Grand-Père Lake and Méridé Lake; the outlet (coming from the southeast) of Lakes Brûlé and Patrick; the Bergeron watercourse (coming from the southwest); the outlet (coming from the east) of Lac de la Tour; to the confluence of the rivière des Cèdres (coming from the east);
- 1.5 kilometres (0.93 mi) northwesterly to the outlet of Bras d'Hamel (coming from the southwest);
- 7.2 kilometres (4.5 mi) to the northwest by collecting the outlet (coming from the east) of Bergeron Lake and crossing the falls at Gamelin, up to a bend in the river;
- 4.6 kilometres (2.9 mi) northeasterly across an agricultural zone, collecting the Savanier Creek (coming from the southwest), passing under a railway bridge, then crossing the La Baie area in the city of Saguenay (city) to its mouth.

The "Ha! Ha! river" spills on the southwest shore of the Baie des Ha! Ha! at the edge of the Port-Alfred and Bagotville areas of Saguenay (city). This mouth is located at:

- 9.9 kilometres (6.2 mi) southwest of the entrance to the Baie des Ha! Ha!;
- 17.2 kilometres (10.7 mi) south-east of downtown Saguenay (city);
- 73.3 kilometres (45.5 mi) from the mouth of lac Saint-Jean (via the outfall of the Grande Décharge);
- 87.4 kilometres (54.3 mi) west of the confluence of the Saguenay River and the St. Lawrence River.

== Etymology ==
The term Ha! Ha! would not fall under the onomatopoeia but rather a derivation of the term French ha-ha which means unexpected obstacle on a path.

In Saguenay-Lac-Saint-Jean, some places also use this expression in their toponymy:

- Baie des Ha! Ha!,
- Lake Ha! Ha!,
- Petit lac Ha! Ha!.

== See also ==
- Le Fjord-du-Saguenay Regional County Municipality, a RCM
- Laurentides Wildlife Reserve (French: Réserve faunique des Laurentides)
- Ferland-et-Boilleau, Quebec, a municipality
- Saguenay, Quebec, a city
- Ha! Ha! Pyramid
- Pont du Lac-Ha! Ha!
- Lake Ha! Ha!
- Petit lac Ha! Ha!
- Rivière à Pierre
- Rivière des Cèdres (Ha! Ha! River)
- Saguenay River
- Saint Lawrence River
- List of rivers of Quebec
