= Lake Ha! Ha! =

Lake in Saguenay, in Quebec, Canada

Coordinates: 48.039°N 70.845°W

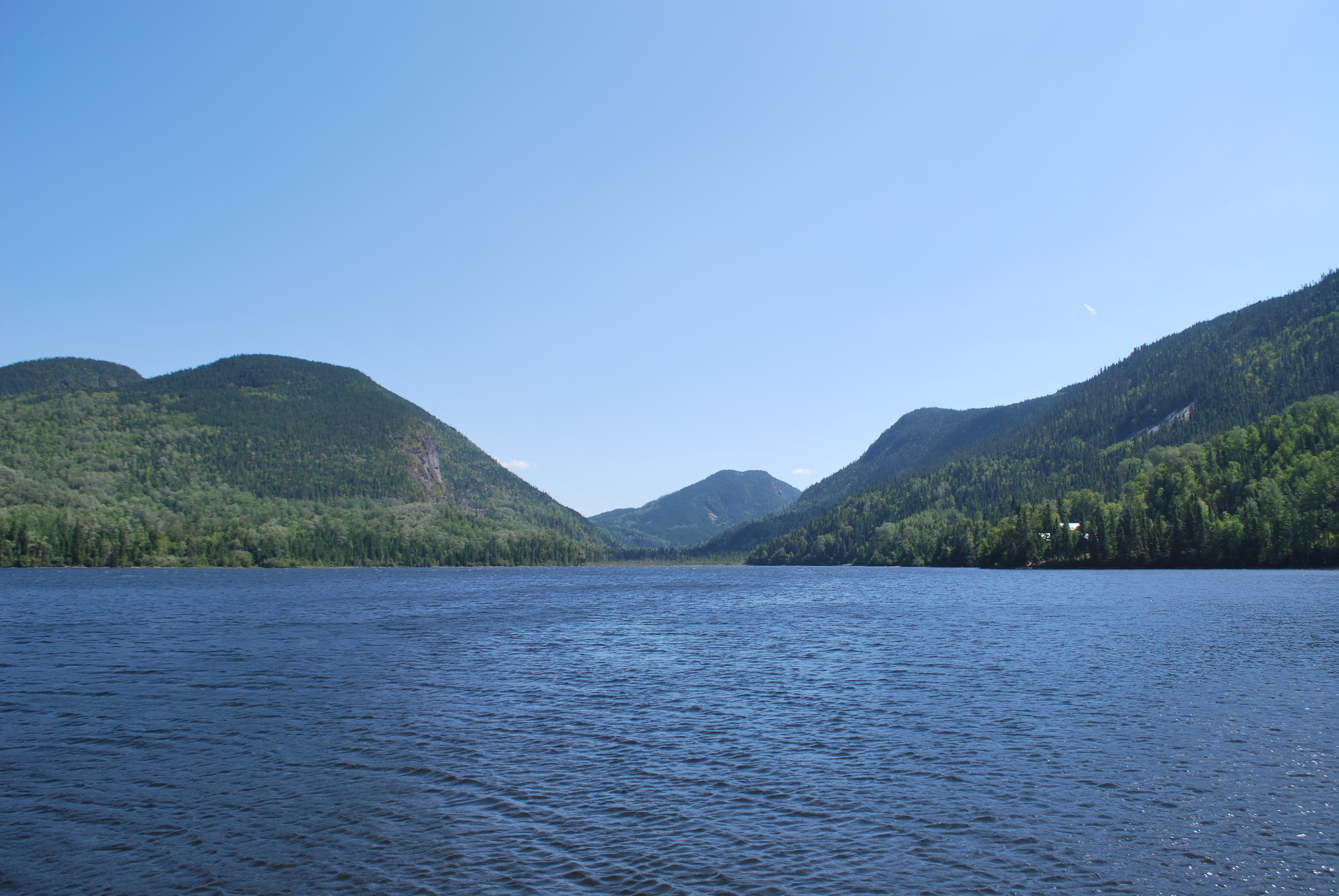
- Surroundings of the lake

- Location within Quebec
- Location: Saguenay / Lac-Ministuk / Larouche / Hébertville, Saguenay–Lac-Saint-Jean, Quebec
- Primary inflows: Outlet of lake Michta, outlet of petit lac Ha! Ha!, Ha! Ha! River, outlet of lake Légal, Pierre River (Ha! Ha! River)
- Primary outflows: Ha! Ha! River
- Basin countries: Canada
- Max. length: 7.0 km (4.3 mi)
- Max. width: 1.4 km (0.87 mi)
- Surface elevation: 379 m (1,243 ft)
- Settlements: Ferland-et-Boilleau, Quebec

Lake Ha! Ha! (French: Lac Ha! Ha!, pronounced [lak a a]) is a waterbody tributary of the Ha! Ha! River. It is located in the municipality of Ferland-et-Boilleau, Quebec, in the Le Fjord-du-Saguenay Regional County Municipality (MRC), in administrative region of Saguenay-Lac-Saint-Jean, in Quebec, located in the Saguenay River valley, in Canada.

The southeastern portion of the petit lac Ha! Ha! is served by route 381, which separates the lakes petit lac Ha! Ha! and lake Ha! Ha!. The bridge passes over the waterbody at the peninsula attached to the north shore and then the route goes northwest to serving the northwestern part of the lake Ha! Ha!. The landscape of this lake, surrounded by mountains, attracts nature lovers.

Forestry is the main economic activity of the sector; recreational tourism activities, second.

The surface of Lake Ha! Ha! is usually frozen from late November to early April; however, safe ice movement is generally from mid-December to late March.

== Geography ==
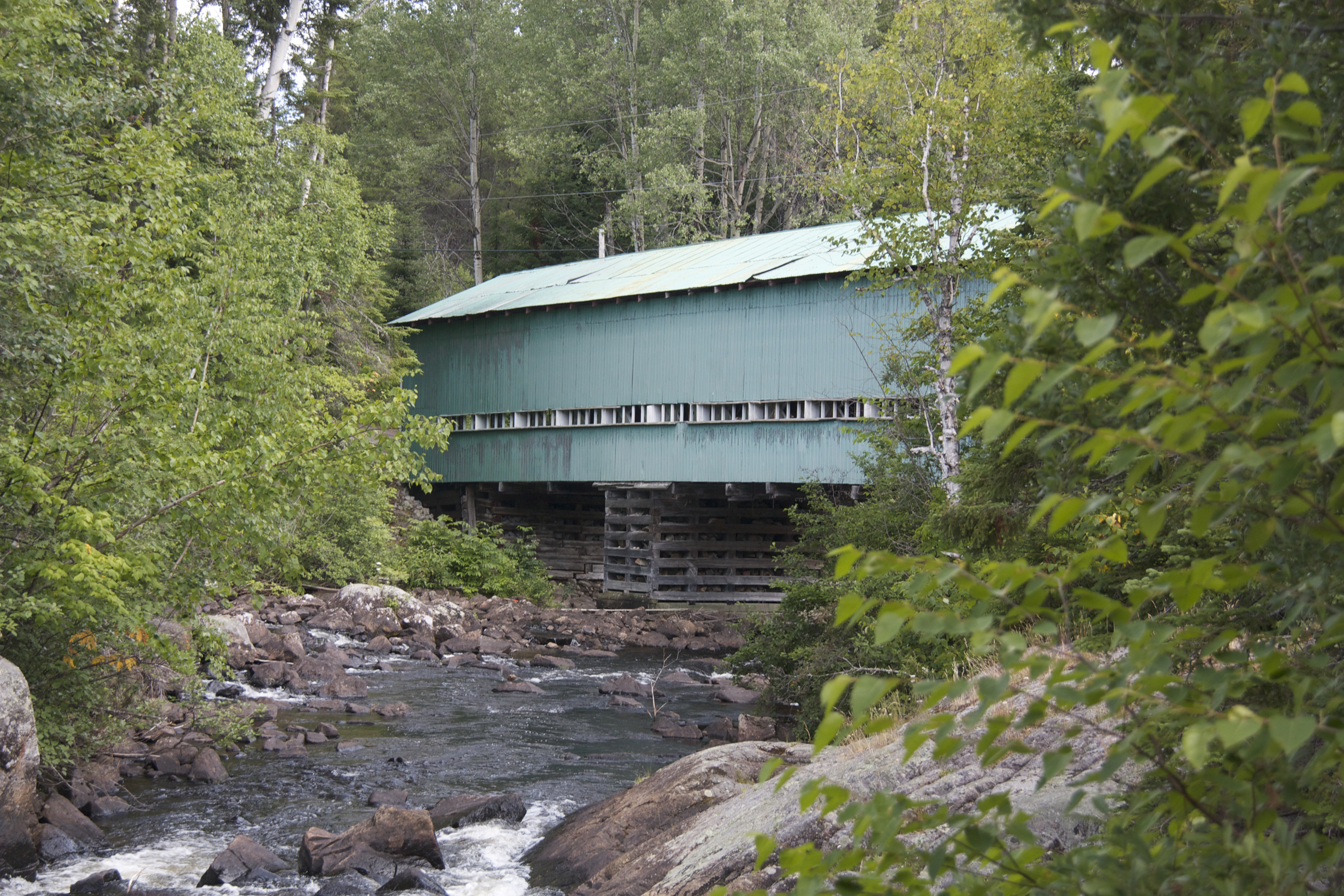
Lake Ha! Ha! Bridge, separating the two lakes.

The main hydrographic slopes near Lake Ha! Ha! are:

- north side: Huard Lake, Ha! Ha! River, Hamel Arm, rivière des Cèdres, Papinachois Creek, Brébeuf Lake, Éternité Lake;
- east side: John Creek, Malbaie River, Pin Creek;
- south side: Ha! Ha! River, Pierre River, Viper Lake, Cinto Lake, Rivière à Mars Northwest;
- west side: Pierre River, rivière à Mars.

The Ha! Ha! Lake consists of length of 7.0 kilometres (4.3 mi) with a crescent-shaped open to the north-east of which the southeastern extremity stretches 4.9 kilometres (3.0 mi) eastward between mountains. Its maximum width is 1.4 kilometres (0.87 mi); its altitude is 379 metres (1,243 ft); and its area is . The Ha! Ha! Lake is crossed on 6.6 kilometres (4.1 mi) to the northwest by the current of Ha! Ha! River to the dam at its mouth; while the current of the Pierre River flows northward on 3.2 kilometres (2.0 mi).

The Ha! Ha! Lake supplies itself from the outlet of Huard Lake (coming from the northwest), a creek (coming from the east), a creek (coming from the south), Ha! Ha! River (coming from the southeast), two unidentified streams and the Pierre River (coming from the West).

The dam at the mouth of the lake is located at:

- 2.7 kilometres (1.7 mi) south of the village center of Boileau, Quebec;
- 3.2 kilometres (2.0 mi) southwest of Huard Lake;
- 28.1 kilometres (17.5 mi) south-east of the confluence of the Ha! Ha! River and the Baies des Ha! Ha! (Saguenay-Lac-Saint-Jean);
- 43.2 kilometres (26.8 mi) south-east of downtown Saguenay, Quebec;
- 73.7 kilometres (45.8 mi) northwest of downtown Baie-Saint-Paul.

From the dam at the mouth of the lake, the stream flows down the Ha! Ha! River on 34.8 kilometres (21.6 mi) to the northwest, across the Baie des Ha! Ha! (Saguenay-Lac-Saint-Jean) on 10.7 kilometres (6.6 mi) northeasterly, then go east on the Saguenay River on 87 kilometres (54 mi) to Tadoussac where this last river flows into the St. Lawrence River.

== Toponymy ==
The specific "Ha! Ha!" generates several interpretations according to the sources consulted. A popular interpretation associates it with an exclamation indicating irony or onomatopoeia of laughter. It is generally recognized by historians that it is rather a descriptive denomination. This specific derives from the French word haha, meaning "an unexpected obstacle on a path". This term identifies a ditch at the end of an alley that blocks a passage. This term is used in the military vocabulary because it describes a ditch located at the postern or at the entrance of a fortification, thus preventing the passage. In addition, the recollect Gabriel Sagard (baptized Théodat) published the Dictionary of the Huron Language (Paris, 1632), following a ten-month stay of the brother in Huron, from 1623 to 1624, in which is listed the noun Háhattey, meaning "road, lane or address".

The toponym Lake Ha! Ha! was formalized on December 5, 1968, by the Commission de toponymie du Québec.

== See also ==
- Le Fjord-du-Saguenay Regional County Municipality, a RCM
- Ferland-et-Boilleau, Quebec, a municipality
- Petit lac Ha! Ha!
- Minnehaha
- Ha-ha – Type of recessed barrier
