= Quebec Route 381 =

Highway in Quebec, Canada

Route 381

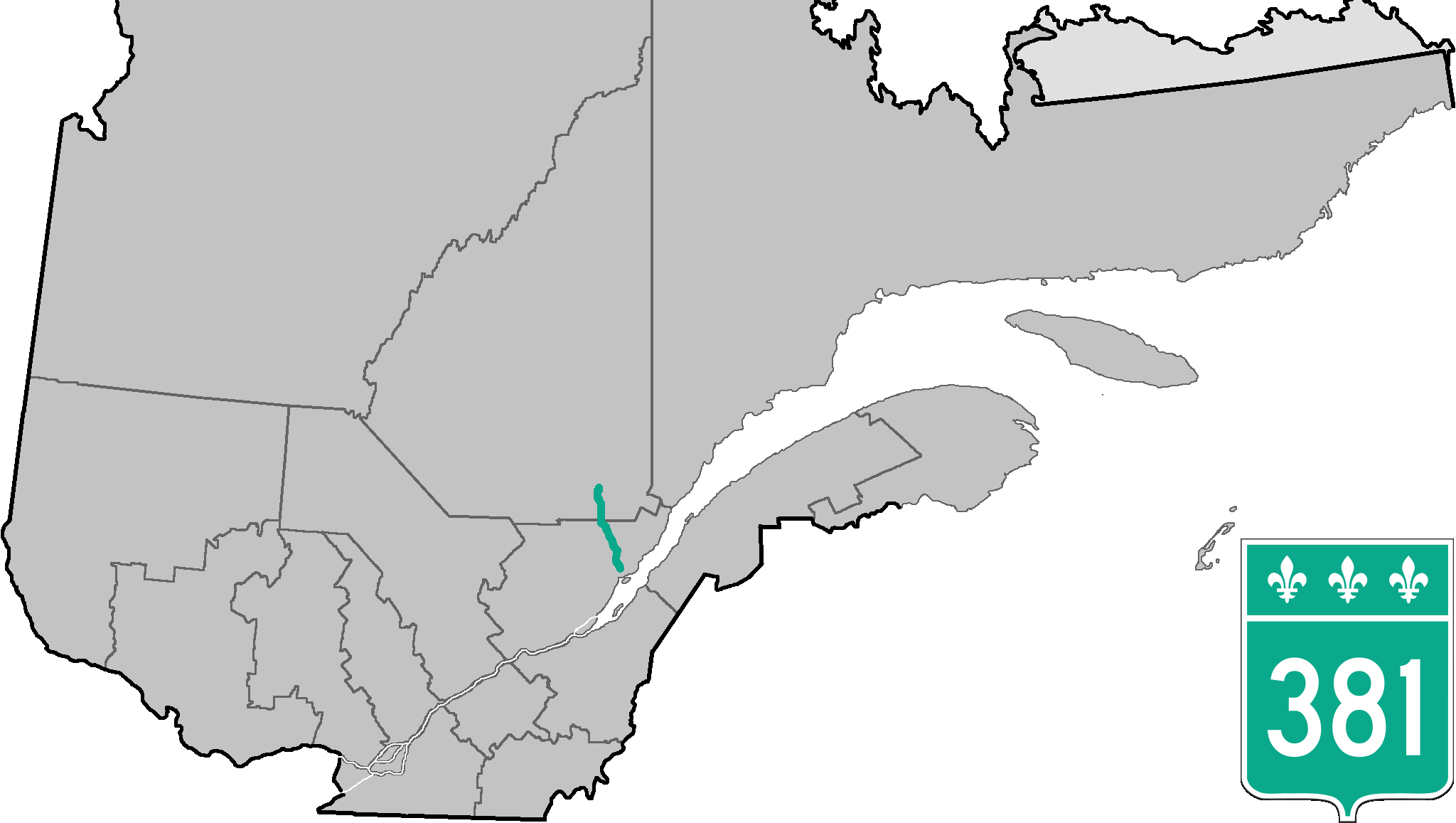

Route information
- Maintained by Transports Québec
- Length: 114 km (71 mi)

Major junctions
- North end: R-170 in Saguenay (La Baie)
- South end: R-138 in Baie-Saint-Paul

Location
- Country: Canada
- Province: Quebec
- Major cities: Saguenay, Baie-Saint-Paul

Highway system
- Quebec provincial highways; Autoroutes; List; Former
← R-373	→ R-382

Route 381 is a provincial highway located in the Capitale-Nationale and Saguenay–Lac-Saint-Jean regions of Quebec, Canada. It runs from Baie-Saint-Paul (in Charlevoix) at the junction of Route 138 and ends in the La Baie sector of the City of Saguenay at the junction of Route 170.

== Towns located along Route 381 ==
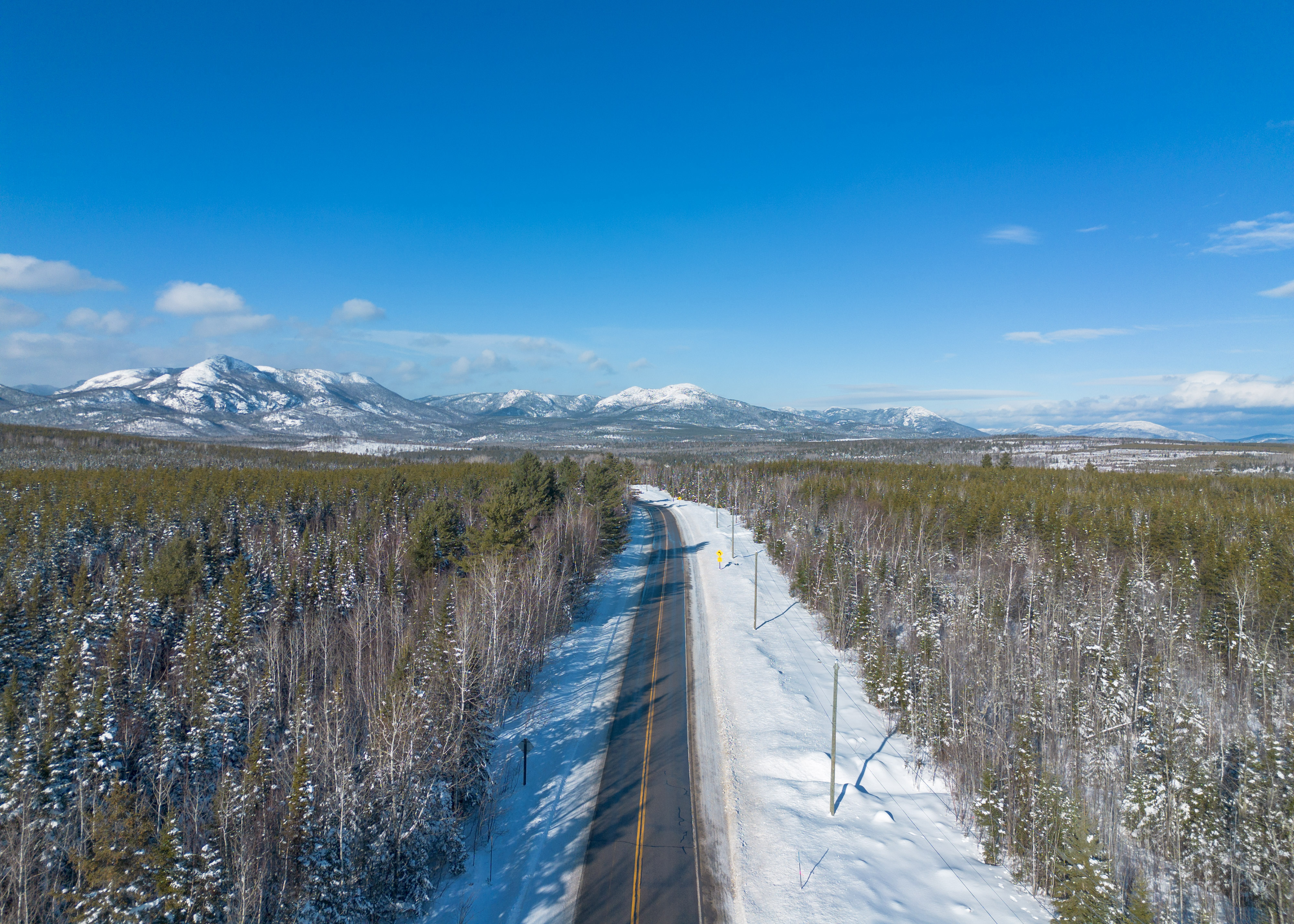
Quebec Route 381 near Grands-Jardins National Park.

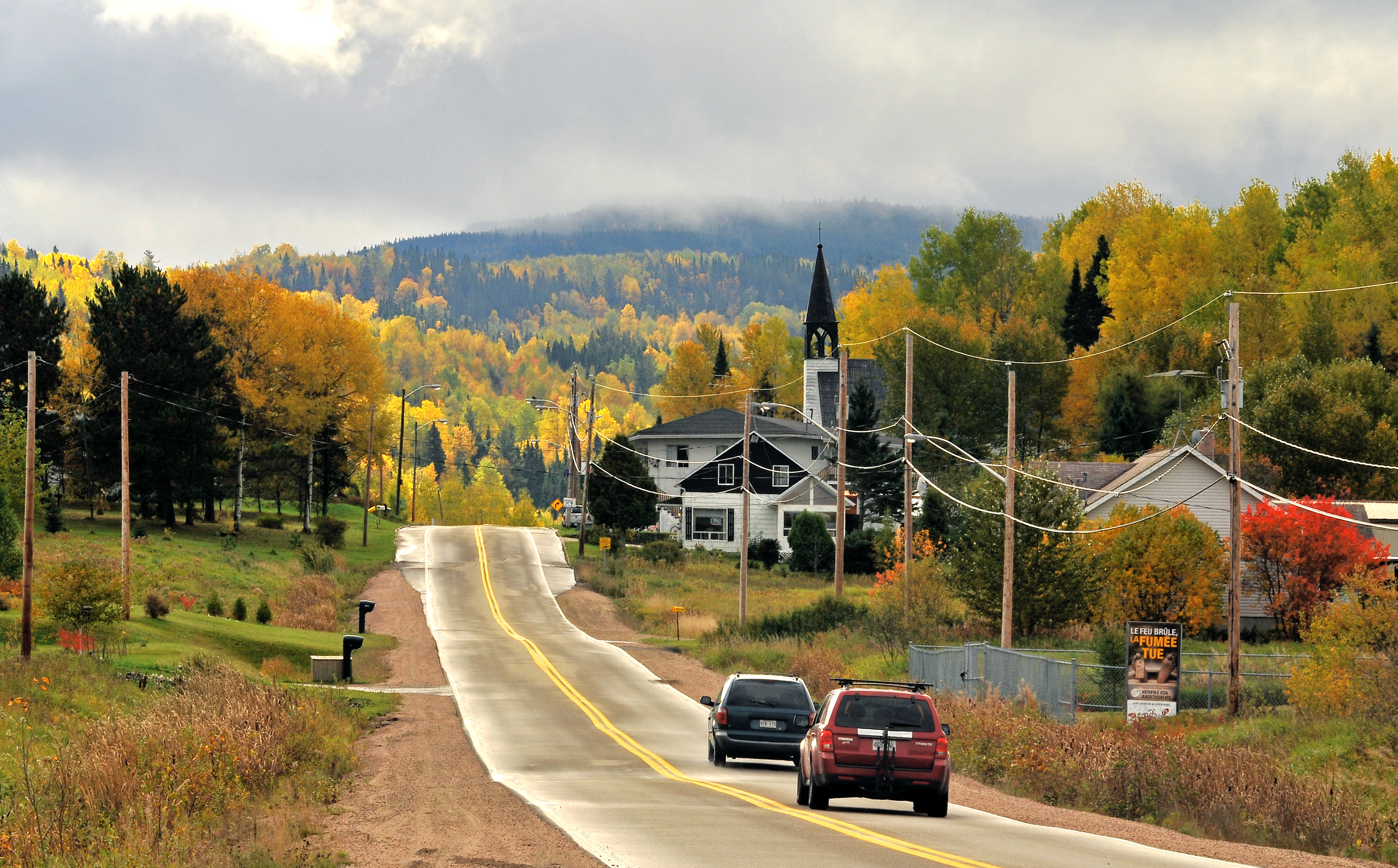
Quebec Route 381 in Ferland-et-Boilleau

- Baie-Saint-Paul
- Saint-Urbain
- Lac-Pikauba
- Ferland-et-Boilleau
- Saguenay

== See also ==
- List of Quebec provincial highways
