= Baie des Ha! Ha! (Saguenay River) =

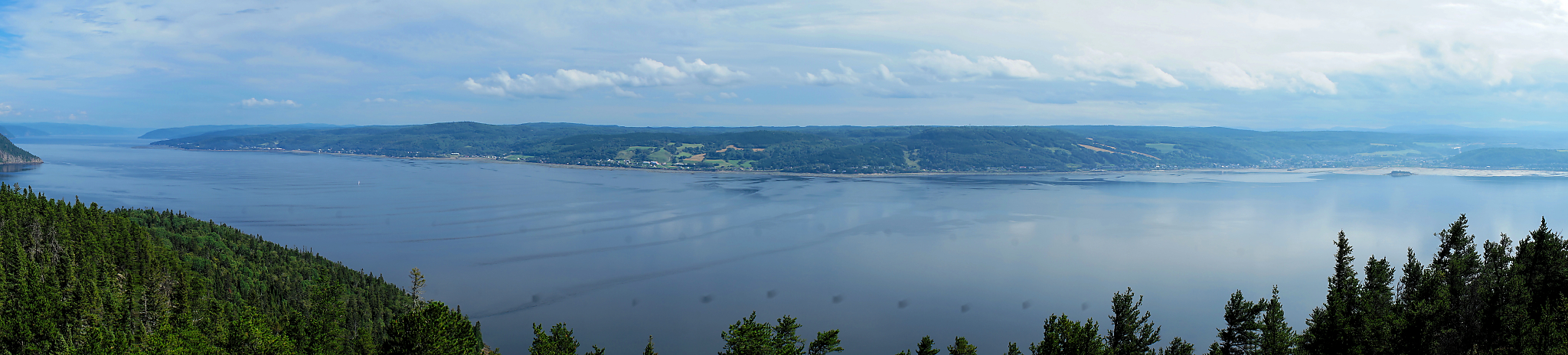

- Location within Quebec

- Map of the Baie des Ha! Ha!
- Location: Saguenay River, Quebec, Canada
- Coordinates: 48°20′54″N 70°48′36″W
- Type: Bay
- Max. length: 11 km (6.8 mi)
- Max. width: 4.6 km (2.9 mi)
- Surface area: 31 km (19 mi)

The Baie des Ha! Ha! is a particularly developed cove over a length of eleven kilometres on the Saguenay River in the region of Saguenay–Lac-Saint-Jean in Quebec, Canada. At the end of this natural corridor, which was originally called in French the "Grande Anse", then the "Grande Baie", there are the Ha! Ha! River and Rivière à Mars. According to the Second Saguenay theory, this vast depression is the extension of the fault and collapse ditch of the Kenogami Lake which is located upstream less than twenty kilometers.

== History ==
Long before the landing in 1838 of the Charlevoix settlers, founders of the Saint-Alexis-sur-l'Islet parish, this haven sheltered at the end of the bay constitutes a place of meeting and exchanges for the Amerindian populations. The two villages that have become modest urban centers in the 20th century merge before finding themselves in the center of the district of La Baie within the big city of Saguenay. It is through this bay that the bauxite of the aluminum smelters of Saguenay-Lac-Saint-Jean transits to the port facilities of Port-Alfred to be discharged subsequently carried by train to the various factories of Rio Tinto Alcan.

Since September 2009, the tourist potential of the bay has been exploited with the inauguration of a port of call for cruise ships. During the winter for more than 2,000 years, when the ice is solid there, they practice ice fishing. The Saguenay flood, in July 1996 caused a significant deposit of sediment in this bay.

== Toponymy ==
The term Ha! Ha! does not come under the trivial onomatopoeia, but probably from an alteration of a Montagnais toponym almost unpronounceable in French which means in Algonquin place where bark is exchanged. Other linguists think of a possible derivation of the term French haha which means unexpected obstacle on a path. But in this specific case, we do not perceive the obstacle in question.

In Saguenay-Lac-Saint-Jean, certain places, moreover, correlated with the hydrographic basin leading towards the bay on the homonymous Saguenay also use this appellation:

- Ha! Ha! River;
- Lake Ha! Ha!;
- Petit lac Ha! Ha!;

== Geography ==
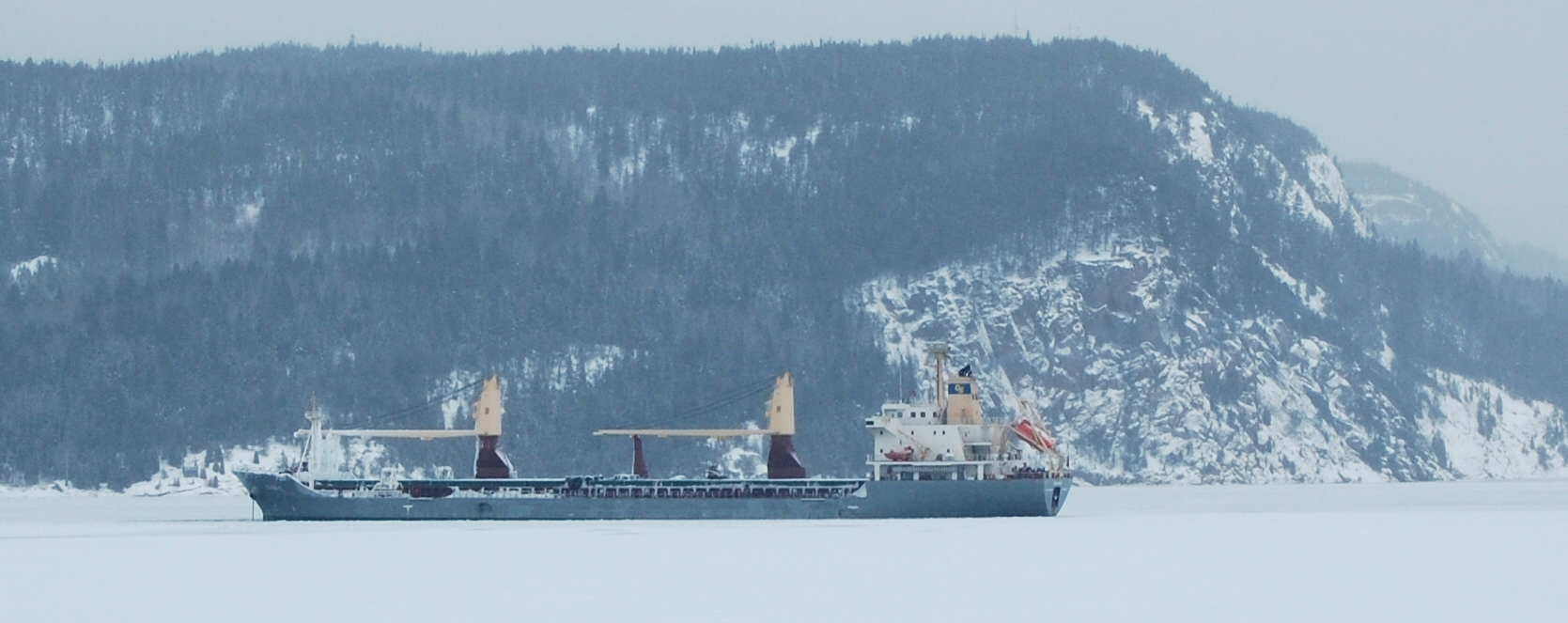
Ship in the Baie des Ha! Ha!

The "Baie des Ha! Ha!" is a large return from the Saguenay River in the land which seems the normal continuation of the Saguenay fjord. This bay has a length of 11 km (6.8 mi), a maximum width of 4.6 km (2.9 mi) and an altitude of 4 m (13 ft).

From the confluence of Baie des Ha! Ha! the current follows the course of the Saguenay River on 99.5 km (61.8 mi) eastward to Tadoussac where it merges with the Estuary of Saint Lawrence.

== Environment ==
=== Fauna ===
==== Riverine fauna ====
One counts among the fauna bordering the Baie Ha! Ha! species of mammals common to the whole of Saguenay Fjord and the mixed forest Quebec. You can observe:

- river otter
- American mink
- pygmy weasel
- long-tailed weasel
- ermine
- striped skunk
- raccoon
- muskrat
- Canadian Beaver
- red fox

==== Marine fauna ====
The "Baie des Ha! Ha!", and the Saguenay River, include about 76 species of freshwater and marine fish. This phenomenon is explained by the fact that the "Baie des Ha! Ha!" consists of two overlapping layers of water. On the surface, a layer of slightly salty water which comes from the rivers which flow into the fjord, and in depth, the salty and cold water which, here in this upstream basin, is slowly renewed at a rate close to the annual after entering the Saguenay by tidal effect from the Gulf of St. Lawrence. The presence of these two layers separated by a halocline thickness promotes a rich biodiversity and makes it a very favorable environment for life. Among these species, we can count:

- the brook trout
- the rainbow smelt
- Atlantic cod
- the sébaste
- the Greenland shark
- sea trout
- the lake sturgeon
- the American eel

== See also ==
- Grande-Baie
- Baie des Ha! Ha! (Côte-Nord), a bay in Gros-Mécatina, Quebec
