= Ferland-et-Boilleau =

- Municipality
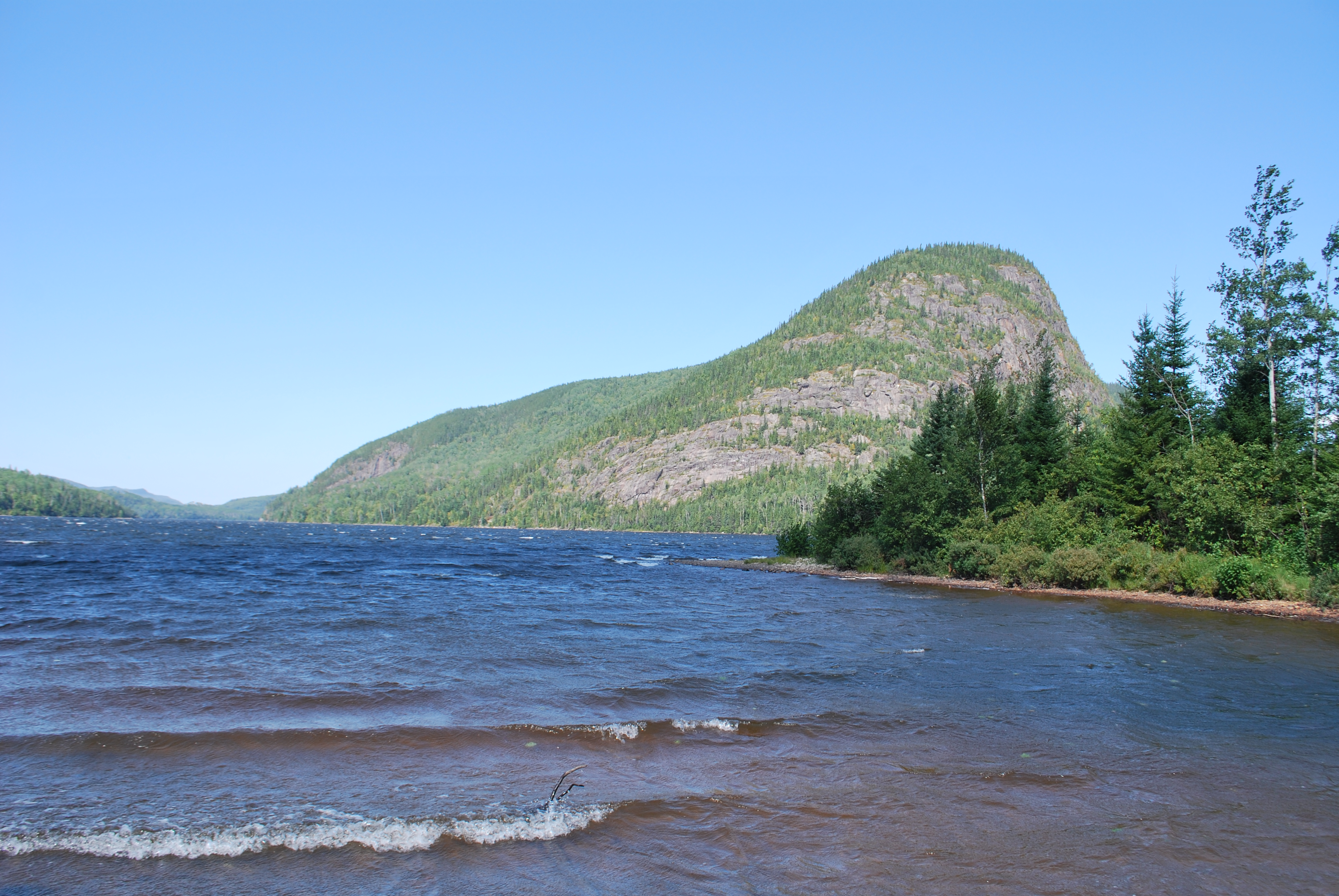
- Lake Ha!Ha! in Ferland-et-Boilleau

- Location in Saguenay–Lac-Saint-Jean Quebec.
- Coordinates: 48°06′N 70°50′W
- Country: Canada
- Province: Quebec
- Region: Saguenay–Lac-Saint-Jean
- RCM: Le Fjord-du-Saguenay
- Constituted: January 1, 1978

Government
  - Mayor: Carmen Simard
  - Federal riding: Chicoutimi—Le Fjord
  - Prov. riding: Dubuc

Area
  - Total: 407.30 km^{2} (157.26 sq mi)
  - Land: 383.09 km^{2} (147.91 sq mi)

Population (2021)
  - Total: 632
  - Density: 1.6/km^{2} (4.1/sq mi)
  - Pop (2016–21): ▲17%
  - Dwellings: 319
- Time zone: UTC−5 (EST)
  - Summer (DST): UTC−4 (EDT)
- Postal code(s): G0V 1H0
- Area codes: 418 and 581
- Highways: R-381
- Website: www.ferlandetboilleau.com

Ferland-et-Boilleau (French pronunciation: [fɛʁlɑ̃ e bwalo]) is a municipality in the Canadian province of Quebec, located in Le Fjord-du-Saguenay Regional County Municipality. This municipality is located on Route 381 relatively near Saguenay.

== Climate ==
Climate data for Ferland-et-Boilleau
Month	Jan	Feb	Mar	Apr	May	Jun	Jul	Aug	Sep	Oct	Nov	Dec	Year
Record high °C (°F)	16 (61)	15 (59)	24 (75)	28.5 (83.3)	33.9 (93.0)	37 (99)	36 (97)	35 (95)	32.2 (90.0)	26 (79)	20.6 (69.1)	14 (57)	37 (99)
Mean daily maximum °C (°F)	−9.7 (14.5)	−7.2 (19.0)	−0.1 (31.8)	7.6 (45.7)	16.5 (61.7)	21.9 (71.4)	24.2 (75.6)	22.7 (72.9)	16.8 (62.2)	9.6 (49.3)	1.7 (35.1)	−5.9 (21.4)	8.2 (46.8)
Daily mean °C (°F)	−17.3 (0.9)	−14.7 (5.5)	−7 (19)	1.5 (34.7)	9.3 (48.7)	14.6 (58.3)	17.2 (63.0)	15.8 (60.4)	10.6 (51.1)	4.4 (39.9)	−3.1 (26.4)	−12.1 (10.2)	1.6 (34.9)
Mean daily minimum °C (°F)	−24.7 (−12.5)	−22.1 (−7.8)	−13.8 (7.2)	−4.6 (23.7)	2 (36)	7.4 (45.3)	10.2 (50.4)	9 (48)	4.3 (39.7)	−0.9 (30.4)	−7.9 (17.8)	−18.4 (−1.1)	−5 (23)
Record low °C (°F)	−46.7 (−52.1)	−43.9 (−47.0)	−38.5 (−37.3)	−30.5 (−22.9)	−11.1 (12.0)	−5 (23)	0 (32)	−2 (28)	−7.8 (18.0)	−13.9 (7.0)	−27.8 (−18.0)	−42.5 (−44.5)	−46.7 (−52.1)
Average precipitation mm (inches)	52.8 (2.08)	48.5 (1.91)	46.7 (1.84)	50.8 (2.00)	83.7 (3.30)	92.3 (3.63)	109.2 (4.30)	98.2 (3.87)	89.9 (3.54)	73.9 (2.91)	72 (2.8)	75.5 (2.97)	893.5 (35.18)
Source: Environment Canada
