= Rivière à la Loutre (Saguenay River tributary) =

Tributary of the Saguenay River (Quebec, Canada)

Rivière à la Loutre Old name: "Anderson River"

Location
- Country: Canada
- Province: Quebec
- Region: Saguenay-Lac-Saint-Jean
- Regional County Municipality: Le Fjord-du-Saguenay Regional County Municipality

Physical characteristics
- Source: Confluence of two mountain streams
  - location: Saint-Fulgence
  - coordinates: 48°32′25″N 70°55′09″W
  - elevation: 231 m (758 ft)
- Mouth: Saguenay River
  - location: Saint-Fulgence
  - coordinates: 48°27′16″N 70°55′10″W
  - elevation: 4 m (13 ft)
- Length: 14.0 km (8.7 mi)

Basin features
- Progression: Saguenay River, Saint Lawrence River
- Tributaries
  - left: (upstream)
  - right: (upstream)

The rivière à la Loutre (English: Otter River) is a tributary of the Saguenay River, flowing in the municipality of Saint-Fulgence in the Le Fjord-du-Saguenay Regional County Municipality, in the administrative region of Saguenay-Lac-Saint-Jean, in Quebec, in Canada.

The route 172 (route de Tadoussac) crosses the river at the Otter at its mouth. Rang Saint-Louis road (north–south direction) serves the west side of this river.

Forestry is the sector's primary economic activity; second, recreational tourism activities.

The surface of Rivière à la Loutre is usually frozen from late November to early April, however safe traffic on the ice is generally from mid-December to late March.

== Geography ==
The main neighboring watersheds of the Rivière à la Loutre are:

- North side: Valin River, Saint-Louis River, Canada stream;
- East side: Lajoie stream, Outardes River, Moulin brook, Glissant brook, Pelletier River, rivière de la Descente des Femmes, Saguenay River, Sainte-Marguerite River;
- South side: Saguenay River;
- West side: Valin River, Caribou River, Shipshaw River.

The Rivière à la Loutre takes its source from a mountain stream (altitude: 231 m (758 ft)). This source is located at: 0.8 km (0.50 mi) to the south of the course of the le Petit Bras and at 9.9 m (32 ft) to the north-west from the mouth of the river to the Otter.

From its source, at the confluence of two mountain streams, the course of the Rivière à la Loutre descends on 14.0 km (8.7 mi) according to the following segments:

- 4.0 km (2.5 mi) south, to rang Sainte-Anne road;
- 3.3 km (2.1 mi) southwesterly, forming an easterly curve to Rang Sainte-Marie road;
- 5.3 km (3.3 mi) to the south in a deep valley, to a stream (coming from the west) corresponding to a bend in the river;
- 1.4 km (0.87 mi) towards the south-east at the foot of a mountain, delimiting the northern part of a small plain, to the mouth of the river.

The mouth of the Rivière à la Loutre flows onto the north shore of the Saguenay River in the municipality of Saint-Fulgence. This confluence of the Rivière à la Loutre is located at:

- 2.1 km (1.3 mi) east of the mouth of the Valin River;
- 4.0 km (2.5 mi) west of the center of the village of Saint-Fulgence;
- 9.4 km (5.8 mi) north-east of downtown Saguenay;
- 99.4 km (61.8 mi) west of the mouth of the Saguenay River.

From the mouth of the Rivière à la Loutre, the current follows the course of the Saguenay River eastwards to the height of Tadoussac where it meets the Saint Lawrence River.

== Toponymy ==
The toponym Rivière à la Loutre was formalized on December 5, 1968, at the Place Names Bank of the Commission de toponymie du Québec.

== See also ==
- List of rivers of Quebec
