= Bras des Canots =

- Location within Quebec

Location
- Country: Canada
- Province: Quebec
- Region: Saguenay-Lac-Saint-Jean
- Regional County Municipality: Le Fjord-du-Saguenay Regional County Municipality
- Unorganized territory: Mont-Valin

Physical characteristics
- Source: Lac Bonjour
  - location: Mont-Valin
  - coordinates: 48.71287°N 70.81978°W
  - elevation: 795 m (2,608 ft)
- Mouth: Rivière Valin
  - location: Mont-Valin
  - coordinates: 48.58°N 70.88306°W
  - elevation: 230 m (750 ft)
- Length: 29.1 km (18.1 mi)
- Discharge
  - location: Mont-Valin

Basin features
- Tributaries
  - left: Ruisseau Aurèle.
  - right: Discharge of lac Maurice.

The bras des Canots is a tributary of the Valin River, flowing in the unorganized territory of Mont-Valin, in the Le Fjord-du-Saguenay Regional County Municipality, in the administrative region of Saguenay-Lac-Saint-Jean, in Quebec, in Canada. The course of the Bras des Canots flows mainly in the Monts-Valin National Park.

A secondary forest road serves the southwest bank of the Bras des Canots valley and the lakes upstream; other secondary forest roads have been developed in the sector for the needs of forestry and recreational tourism activities.

The surface of the Canoe's arm is usually frozen from the end of November to the beginning of April, however the safe circulation on the ice is generally done from mid-December to the end of March.

== Geography ==
The main neighboring watersheds of Bras des Canots are:

- North side: Moncouche Lake, Doumic lake, Nisipi River, Sainte-Marguerite River, bras de l'Enfer (rivière à Mars);
- East side: Martin-Valin Lake, Gauthier brook, Sainte-Marguerite River, Boivin River (bras des Murailles), Bras de l'Enfer, Fournier arm;
- South side: Valin River, Saguenay River, Le Petit Bras (Valin river);
- West side: Saint-Louis River, Hector stream, Valin River, Bras de l'Enfer, Bras du Nord, Shipshaw River.

The Bras des Canots rises at the mouth of Duck Lake (length: 0.4 kilometres (0.25 mi); altitude: 795 metres (2,608 ft)). This source is located 5.0 kilometres (3.1 mi) northwest of a bay in the northwest of lac Martin-Valin, 15.5 kilometres (9.6 mi) north of mouth of the Bras des Canots, 17.8 kilometres (11.1 mi) West of the lac Jalobert (Mont-Valin) which flows into the Sainte-Marguerite River and at 30.7 kilometres (19.1 mi) on the North shore of the Saguenay River.

From its source, the course of the Bras des Canots descends on 29.1 kilometres (18.1 mi) according to the following segments:

Upper course of Bras des Canots (segment: 16.4 kilometres (10.2 mi))

- 1.2 kilometres (0.75 mi) south-west, to the east shore of Buttercup Lake;
- 1.7 kilometres (1.1 mi) towards the South by crossing Buttercup lake (length: 2.0 kilometres (1.2 mi); altitude: 782 metres (2,566 ft)) in particular by bypassing a peninsula attached to the east bank and stretching for 0.5 kilometres (0.31 mi) to the west, to its mouth;
- 2.4 kilometres (1.5 mi) south-west, until crossing an unidentified lake (altitude: 778 metres (2,552 ft)) over its full length to its mouth;
- 3.2 kilometres (2.0 mi) south-east, for the east, to the bottom of a narrow bay on the north-west shore of lac Martin-Valin;
- 5.6 kilometres (3.5 mi) towards the South-East, then towards the West by crossing lac Martin-Valin, in particular by bypassing a peninsula attached to the West bank, stretching over 2.3 kilometres (1.4 mi) eastwards, to its mouth;

Lower reaches of Bras des Canots (segment: 12.7 kilometres (7.9 mi))

- 2.5 kilometres (1.6 mi) to the Southwest, in a large inverted Z, to the bottom of a bay on the north shore of Lac aux Canots;
- 3.2 kilometres (2.0 mi) towards the Southwest, crossing Lac aux Canots (altitude: 641 metres (2,103 ft));
- 3.5 kilometres (2.2 mi) south-west, in a deep valley, up to a bend in the river;
- 3.5 kilometres (2.2 mi) to the south in a deep valley with a drop of up to the mouth of the river.

The mouth of the Bras des Canots flows onto the north bank of the Valin River, bypassing an island which blocks the mouth. This confluence is located at:

- 14.1 kilometres (8.8 mi) North of the mouth of the Valin river;
- 22.2 kilometres (13.8 mi) north-east of downtown Saguenay (city);
- 100.4 kilometres (62.4 mi) North-west of the mouth of the Saguenay river.

From the mouth of the Bras des Canots, the current follows the course of the Valin river, then the course of the Saguenay river to the height of Tadoussac where it merges with the St. Lawrence River.

== Toponymy ==
The toponym "Bras des Canots" was formalized on December 2, 1970, at the Place Names Bank of the Commission de toponymie du Québec.

== See also ==
- Le Fjord-du-Saguenay Regional County Municipality
- Mont-Valin, a TNO
- Valin River, a watercourse
- Saguenay River
- Martin-Valin Lake
- St. Lawrence River
- List of rivers of Quebec
