= Valin River (Saguenay River tributary) =

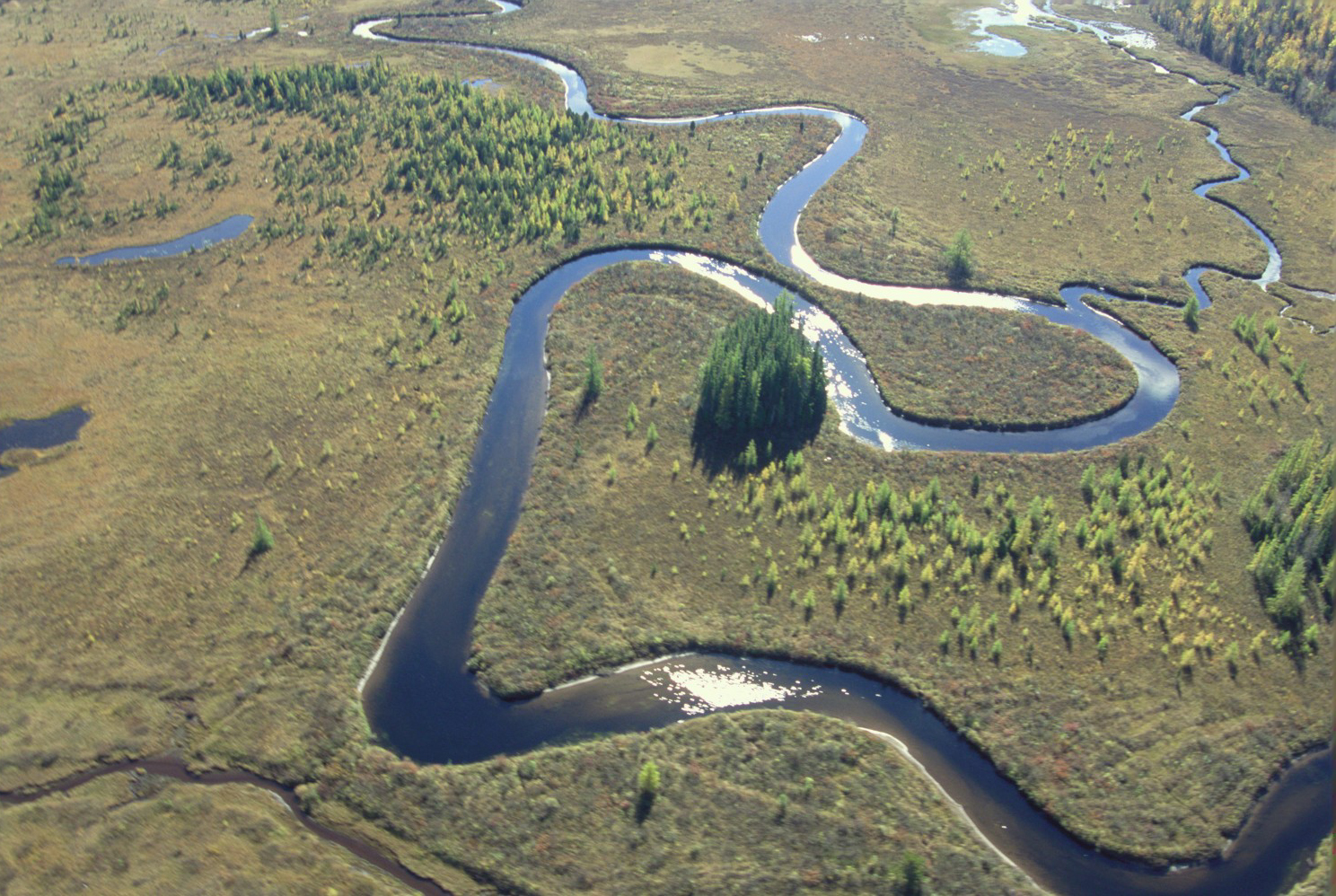

Location
- Country: Canada
- Province: Quebec
- Region: Saguenay-Lac-Saint-Jean
- Regional County Municipality: Le Fjord-du-Saguenay Regional County Municipality
- Unorganized territory: Mont-Valin, Saint-David-de-Falardeau and Saint-Fulgence

Physical characteristics
- Source: Bras Fournier
  - location: Mont-Valin
  - coordinates: 48.56222°N 70.755°W
  - elevation: 320 m (1,050 ft)
- Mouth: Saguenay River
  - location: Saint-Fulgence
  - coordinates: 48.46111°N 70.98444°W
  - elevation: 4 m (13 ft)
- Length: 53.0 km (32.9 mi)
- Discharge
  - location: Mont-Valin

Basin features
- Tributaries
  - left: (upstream) Discharge from an unidentified lake, Le Petit Bras, discharge from Lake Maringouin and Lake Belle Truite, discharge from Lake Castor, unidentified stream, Canada stream, Irish stream.
  - right: (upstream) Bras de l'Enfer (Valin River), outlet of Lakes Gaspart and Marcel, outlet of Lake Simard, outlet of Lake FOurnier, Brook Gauthier, outlet of Lacs des Pères, Bras des Canots, Hector Creek, Saint-Louis River, Lac des Îles outlet, Lac Toussaint outlet, Lac Gagnon outlet, Lac Boudreault outlet, Bras du Nord (Valin River).

The Valin River is a tributary of the Saguenay River, flowing successively in the unorganized territory of Valin Mountains, in Saint-David-de-Falardeau and Saint-Fulgence, in the Le Fjord-du-Saguenay Regional County Municipality, in the administrative region of Saguenay-Lac-Saint-Jean, in the Province of Quebec, in Canada.

Route Villeneuve, chemin du Volair, route Lavoie and chemin de la Chute à François serve the western part of the Valin River; chemin du rang Saint-Joseph and chemin du rang Sainte-Anne serve the eastern part. Finally, the Valin river path serves the northern part of the river.

The surface of the Valin River is usually frozen from the end of November to the beginning of April, however the safe circulation on the ice is generally done from mid-December to the end of March.

== Geography ==
The main watersheds adjacent to the Valin River are:

- north side: Shipshaw River, Étienne River (Shipshaw River), Bras du Nord (Valin River), Bras de l'Enfer (Valin River), Bras Fournier, Saint-Louis River (Valin River tributary), La Mothe Lake;
- east side: Rivière aux Outardes (Saguenay River), Sainte-Marguerite River, Saguenay River;
- south side: Saguenay river;
- west side: Caribou River (Saguenay River), Shipshaw River.

From its source, the confluence of Bras Fournier (coming from the north) and a stream (coming from the East), the course of the Valin river descends on 53.0 kilometres (32.9 mi) according to the following segments:

Upper course of the Valin river (segment of 24.7 kilometres (15.3 mi))

- 2.9 kilometres (1.8 mi) first towards the south-east, by collecting the Canada stream (coming from the East), then towards the south by forming a hook towards the east, until the confluence Bras de l'Enfer (Valin river) (coming from the northwest);
- 5.5 kilometres (3.4 mi) towards the southwest by winding up to the outlet (coming from the northwest) of Lac Fournier;
- 2.6 kilometres (1.6 mi) north-west, up to a bend in the river, corresponding to a stream (coming from the south-east);
- 9.0 kilometres (5.6 mi) (or 6.5 kilometres (4.0 mi) towards the northwest by collecting the Gauthier stream (coming from the north) and meandering in marsh areas, until the confluence of the Bras des Canots (coming from the north);
- 4.7 kilometres (2.9 mi) to the west, collecting the Hector stream (coming from the north) and forming a large curve towards the north at the end of the segment, until the confluence of the Saint-Louis river;

Lower course of the Valin river (segment of 28.3 kilometres (17.6 mi))

- 5.0 kilometres (3.1 mi) towards the south-west, then west by collecting the discharge (coming from the north) of the Lac des Îles, up to a bend in the river;
- 4.5 kilometres (2.8 mi) towards the south by forming a curve towards the west and a loop towards the north at the end of the segment, until the confluence of the Le Petit Bras (Valin River) (coming from the East);
- 3.0 kilometres (1.9 mi) towards the southwest by forming two large streamers, until the Chute à Banc d'Œuvre, corresponding to the confluence of the Bras du Nord (coming from the northwest);
- 7.4 kilometres (4.6 mi) towards the south-east forming a loop towards the east at the end of the segment, up to the Chutes chez Épiphane-Desmeules;
- 4.8 kilometres (3.0 mi) to the south, forming a loop to the east at the end of the segment;
- 3.6 kilometres (2.2 mi) to the south in a deep valley crossing the route 172 at the end of the segment, to the mouth of the river.

The mouth of the Valin River flows onto the north bank of the Saguenay River in the municipality of Saint-Fulgence. This confluence of the Valin river is located at:

- 17.3 kilometres (10.7 mi) northeast of the mouth of the Shipshaw River;
- 49.7 kilometres (30.9 mi) east of downtown Alma;
- 101.7 kilometres (63.2 mi) west of the mouth of the Saguenay River.

From the dam at the mouth of the Valin river, the current follows the course of the Saguenay river to the height of Tadoussac where it merges with the Saint-Laurent river.

== Toponymy ==
The toponym Valin river was formalized on December 5, 1968, at the Place Names Bank of the Commission de toponymie du Québec

== See also ==
- Le Fjord-du-Saguenay Regional County Municipality
- Saint-Fulgence, a municipality
- Monts-Valin National Park
- Bras des Canots, a stream
- Bras du Nord, a stream
- Saint-Louis River, a stream
- Saguenay River
- St. Lawrence River
- List of rivers of Quebec
