= Vallée-de-la-Rivière-Sainte-Marguerite Biodiversity Reserve =

Biodiversity reserve in Quebec, Canada

- Réserve de biodiversité de la Vallée-de-la-Rivière-Sainte-Marguerite
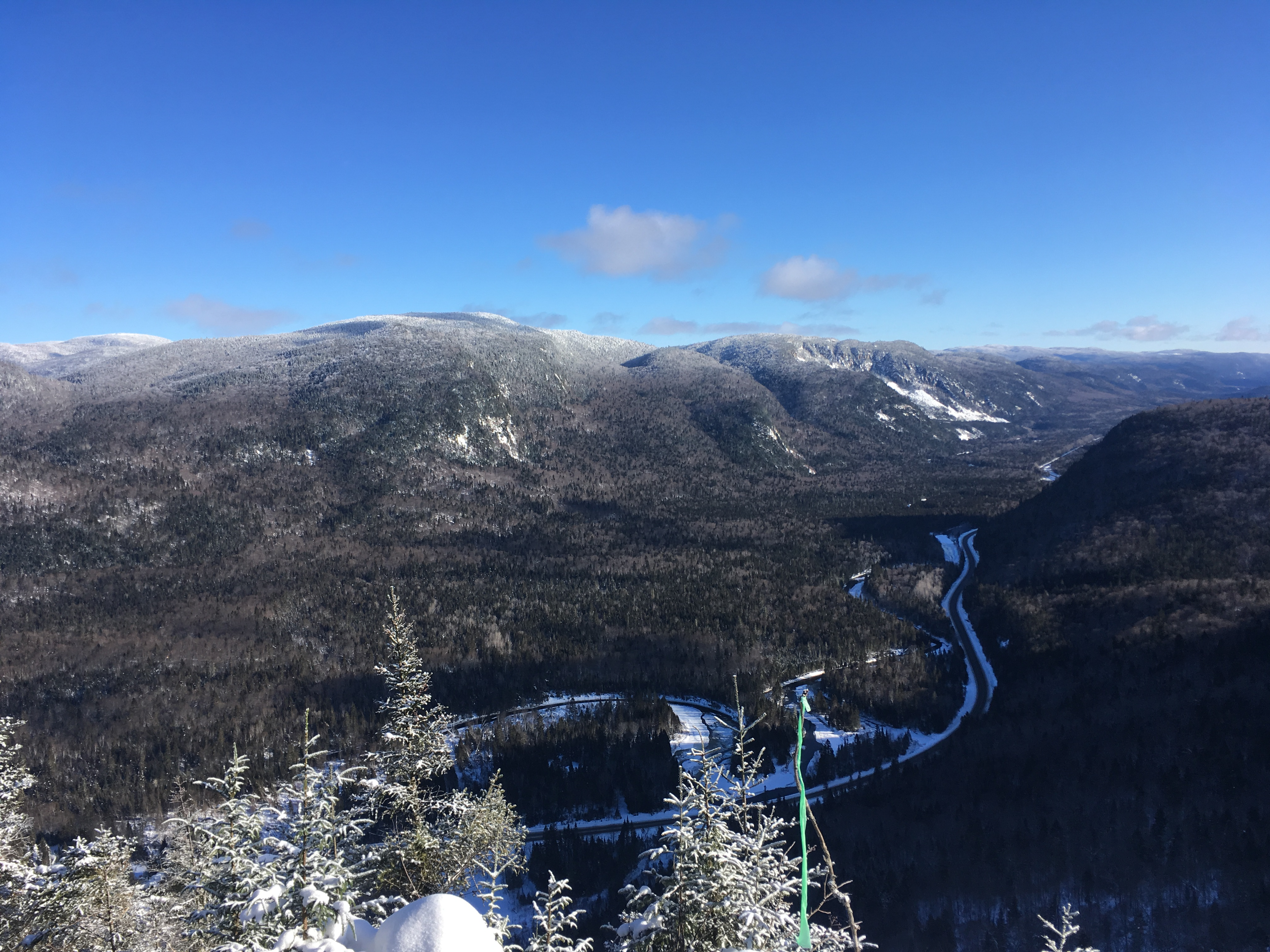
- Sainte-Marguerite River valley from Montagne du Chapeau.

- Location within Quebec
- Type: Biodiversity reserve
- Location: Quebec province, Canada
- Nearest city: Located in Saint-Fulgence, Quebec; Sainte-Rose-du-Nord, Quebec and Sacré-Coeur, Quebec
- Coordinates: 48°20′57″N 70°8′48″W
- Area: 124,093,234 m^{2} (1.33572845×10^{9} sq ft)
- Created: May 13th, 2020
- Owner: Le Fjord-du-Saguenay Regional County Municipality
- Administrator: Ministry of the Environment and the Fight Against Climate Change
- Status: WCPA: II (National park) WDPA: 555567266
- Other information: It also includes the Mont-Valin, Quebec an unorganized territory (territoire non organisé) in Quebec

La Vallée-de-la-Rivière-Sainte-Marguerite Biodiversity Reserve, up to 2022 known as Réserve Aquatique de la Vallée-de-la-Rivière-Sainte-Marguerite, is a biodiversity reserve in Quebec (Canada), located in the Saguenay-Lac-Saint-Jean and Côte-Nord regions. This 321 km^{2} protected area is dedicated to conserving the ecosystems of the Sainte-Marguerite River valley. The latter is located in a glacial valley separating the Saguenay Graben from the Monts Valin. The proximity of these two physiographic units favors the diversity of the flora, with several species at the northern limit of their range.

The Sainte-Marguerite River has been used for hunting and fishing by aboriginal peoples for 8,000 years, as it lies within the traditional territory of the Innue Essipit. The Sainte-Marguerite is renowned for its salmon fishing, which has been practiced recreationally since the mid-19th century. In 1885, the Ste. Marguerite Salmon Club became the exclusive club for this sport. In 1980, with the creation of the Zec de la Rivière-Sainte-Marguerite, the river ceased to be the club's exclusive preserve. In 2005, a large part of the valley was withdrawn from logging and mining operations. After public consultations, the reserve was officially created in May 2020.

== Toponymy ==
This biodiversity reserve owes its name to the Sainte-Marguerite River valley, which it largely protects. The name of the Sainte-Marguerite River appears on a 1731 map by Father Laure and on Bellin's 1744 map.

== Geography ==
The Vallée-de-la-Rivière-Sainte-Marguerite Biodiversity Reserve is located some 15 km northeast of Saguenay and covers an area of 321.4 km^{2}. Most of the reserve is in the Saguenay-Lac-Saint-Jean region, in the unorganized territory of Mont-Valin, with a small portion in the municipalities of Saint-Fulgence and Sainte-Rose-du-Nord, and a small portion in the municipality of Sacré-Cœur in the Côte-Nord region.

The creation of the reserve links Parc national des Monts-Valin, Saguenay Fjord National Park and Saguenay–St. Lawrence Marine Park, creating a network of protected areas spanning more than 2,000 km^{2}. The reserve also shares its boundaries with the G.-Oscar-Villeneuve and Marcelle-Gauvreau ecological reserves. Its boundaries include two exceptional forest ecosystems: the Sainte-Marguerite River old-growth forest and the rare Sainte-Marguerite River and Ruisseau-des-Monts forests.

The reserve also straddles the Martin-Valin, Chauvin and Sainte-Marguerite River controlled harvesting zones (ZECs). These three wildlife management areas cover 37.9% of the reserve.

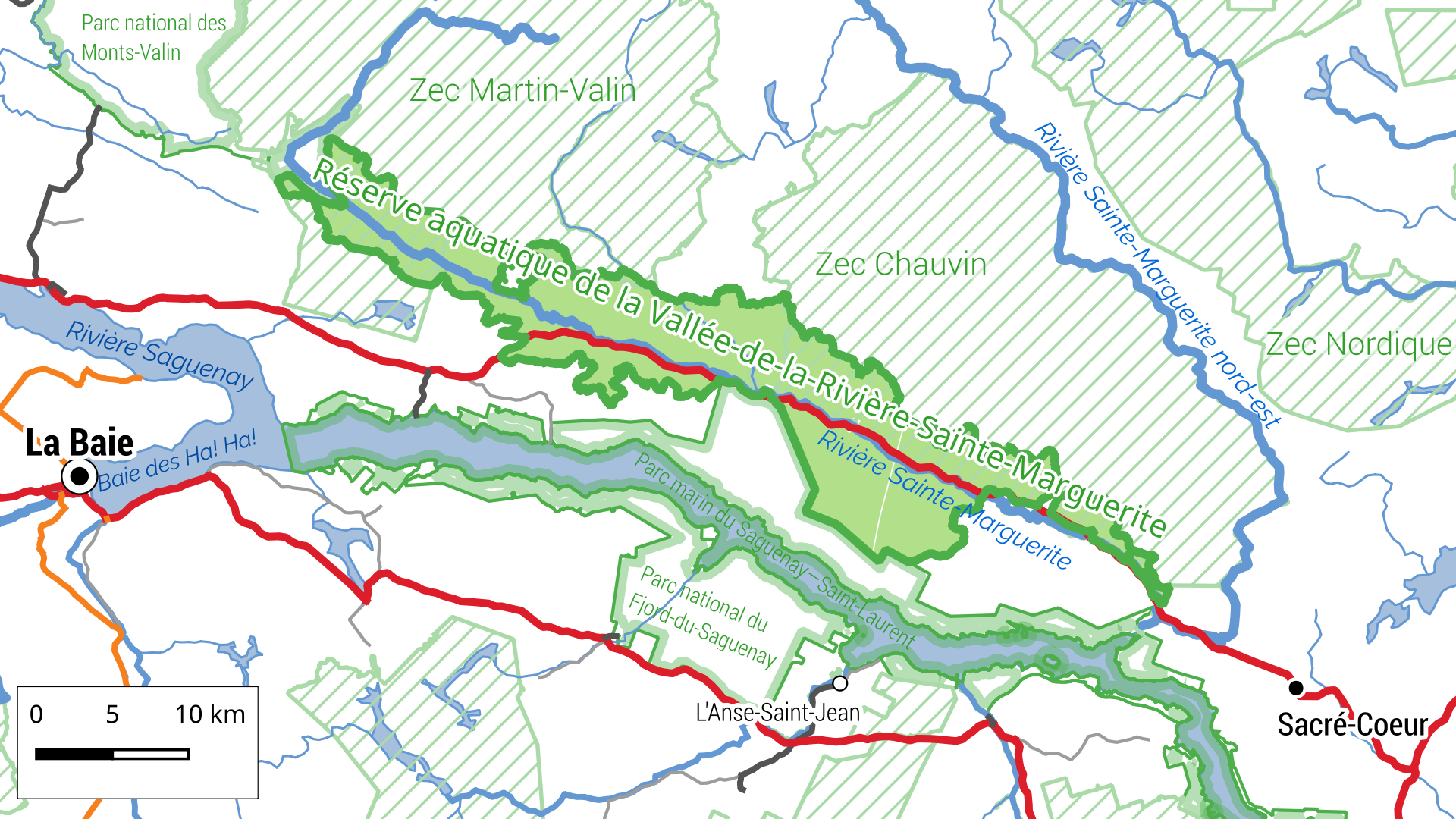
In green, the Vallée-de-la-Rivière-Sainte-Marguerite aquatic reserve.

=== Geology and relief ===
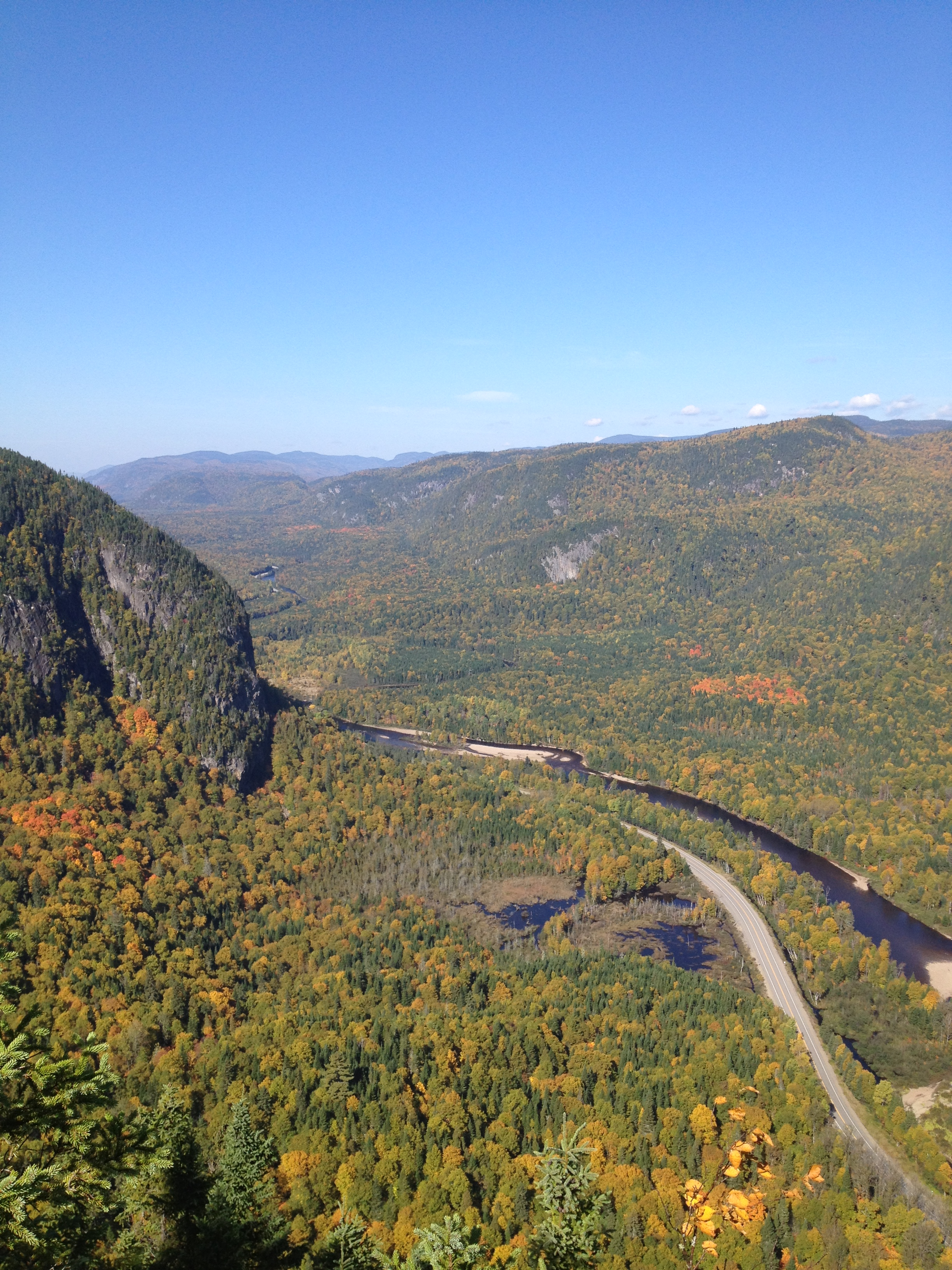
Landscape seen from south of Bardsville.

From a geological point of view, the reserve is part of the Grenville province, mountain ranges formed a billion years ago. The valley marks the boundary between the Saguenay Graben to the south and the Monts Valin to the north. The Monts Valin portion is made up of peaks generally exceeding 700 m in height. Near the valley, this massif features steep slopes with a vertical drop of up to 500 m over one or two kilometers. In the central part of the valley, between Bras des Murailles and Ruisseau Épinette, there is an intermediate terrace between 400 and 500 m in altitude.

The Saguenay Graben was created by the collapse of the Earth's crust during the fracturing of the Rodinia supercontinent some 600 million years ago. The Sainte-Marguerite valley corresponds to the northern limit of the graben, which Quaternary glaciations transformed from a pre-Quaternary valley into a deep glacial valley. To the south of the valley, the summits are between 350 and 500 m high.

The bedrock is composed of charnockite gneiss and mixed gneiss in the eastern and western portions of the reserve, and orthopyroxenite granitoids in the central portion, where the scenery is most spectacular. Unconsolidated deposits are generally composed of rather thin till, except in depressions. Rock outcrops are frequent. The valley floor is composed of fluvioglacial deposits, such as outwash plains and kame terraces.

=== Hydrography ===
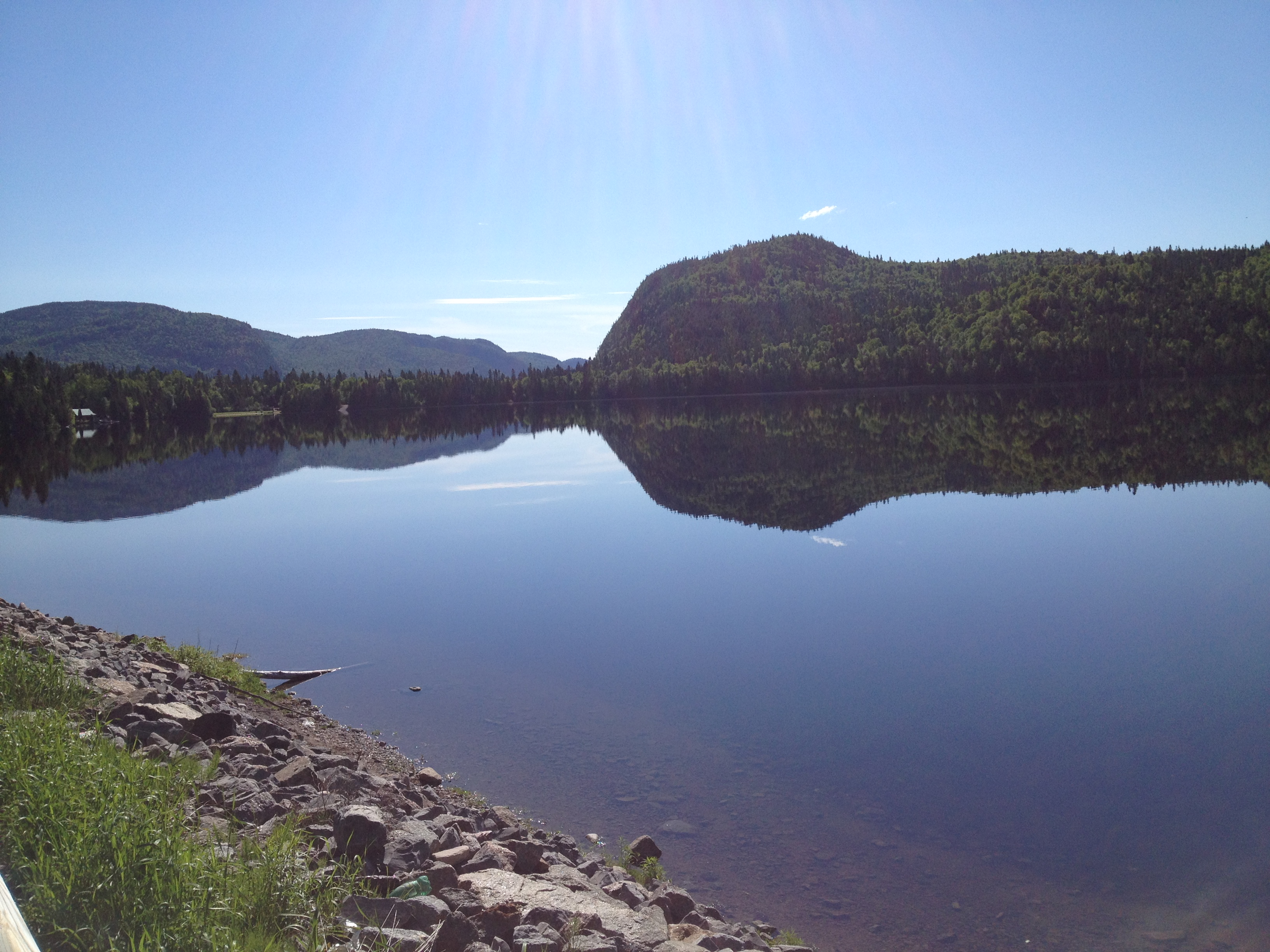
Lake Résimond with Montagne du Chapeau in the background.

Due to the rugged terrain, water bodies and peat bogs are rare in the reserve. The two largest lakes are Lac Résimond and Premier lac du Portage. The most important aquatic environment is undoubtedly the Sainte-Marguerite.

This river, with a basin of over 2,000 km^{2}, rises in the Castor Gras and Sainte-Marguerite lakes. After passing through deep canyons in Monts-Valin National Park, it turns sharply 90° to flow eastwards along the fault line of the Saguenay Graben. It then flows through the reserve for 50 km before leaving it five kilometers from Sacré-Coeur and flowing into Sainte-Marguerite Bay, in the Saguenay Fjord National Park and the Saguenay-St. Lawrence Marine Park. The reserve also includes the last 15 kilometers of the bras des Murailles, its second largest tributary.

=== Weather ===
The territory of the biodiversity reserve has a strong climatic variation. While the climate is considered subpolar and subhumid throughout the reserve, it is milder in the south (average temperature 1.9 to 4.5 °C) than in the north, at the summit of the Monts Valin (-9.4 to -6.0 °C). The growing season is 180 to 209 days in the south and 150 to 179 days in the north. Annual precipitation ranges from 800 to 1,359 mm/year.

== Flora ==
Given its contrasting topography, the aquatic reserve boasts a diverse flora. The areas to the south, the valley and the lower northern slopes are part of the yellow birch fir bioclimatic domain, while from the mid-northern slopes onwards, the reserve is located at the southern limit of the white birch fir bioclimatic domain. Various species are also found at the northern limit of their distribution.

Current vegetation is dominated by mixed forests, which cover 68.4% of the reserve. The dominant formations are white birch betula (32.2%), fir (24.5%) and yellow birch betula (23.1%). There are also a few black spruce and red spruce stands, as well as red maple and sugar maple stands. Poplar stands are abundant near bras d'Allen. White pine and cedar are also found here. American elm and black ash are also found here, the latter being confined to the banks of the Saint-Marguerite River. There is a good proportion of old-growth forest, particularly on the northern slopes. Peat bogs are few and far between.

The reserve's flora comprises 367 taxa, many of which are at the northern limit of their distribution. These include two-crinkle-root (Cardamine diphylla), eastern star sedge (Carex radiata), Carolina springbeauty (Claytonia caroliniana), Dutchman's breeches (Dicentra cucullaria), striped maple (Acer pensylvanicum), silvery spleenwort (Deparia acrostichoides), pale touch-me-not(Impatiens pallida), red spruce (Picea rubens), Howell's pussytoes (Antennaria howellii), maidenhair spleewort (Asplenium trichomanes), dense switchgrass (Dichanthelium implicatum), (Dichanthelium implicatum), Canada wild rye (Elymus wiegandii), Virginia saxifrage (Micranthes virginiensis), grassy arrowhead (Sagittaria graminea) and Rydberg's poison ivy (Toxicodendron radicans var. rydbergii).

There are also disjunct populations of the calcicole flora with the limestone formations of the region: hair-like sedge (Carex capillaris subsp. capillaris), Steller's rockbrake (Cryptogramma stelleri), Lake Mistassini primrose (Primula mistassinica) and purple saxifrage (Saxifraga oppositifolia). Finally, the reserve protects two populations of threeway sedge (Dulichium arundinaceum var. boreale), a taxon endemic to Quebec and soon to be included on the list of threatened, vulnerable, or potentially so-designated species in Quebec.

== Fauna ==
In terms of fauna, no specific inventories have been carried out for the reserve, but the fauna is characteristic of the region. Mammals include American black bear (Ursus americanus), moose (Alces americanus), red fox (Vulpes vulpes), Canada lynx (Lynx canadensis), snowshoe hare (Lepus americanus) and Canadian beaver (Castor canadensis). The rock vole (Microtus chrotorrhinus) is less common. Woodland caribou (Rangifer tarandus caribou) frequent the reserve in spring and early summer. Finally, the reserve may be frequented by the red bat (Lasiurus borealis) and the hoary bat (Lasiurus cinereus), both of which have been reported in the Saguenay Fjord National Park.

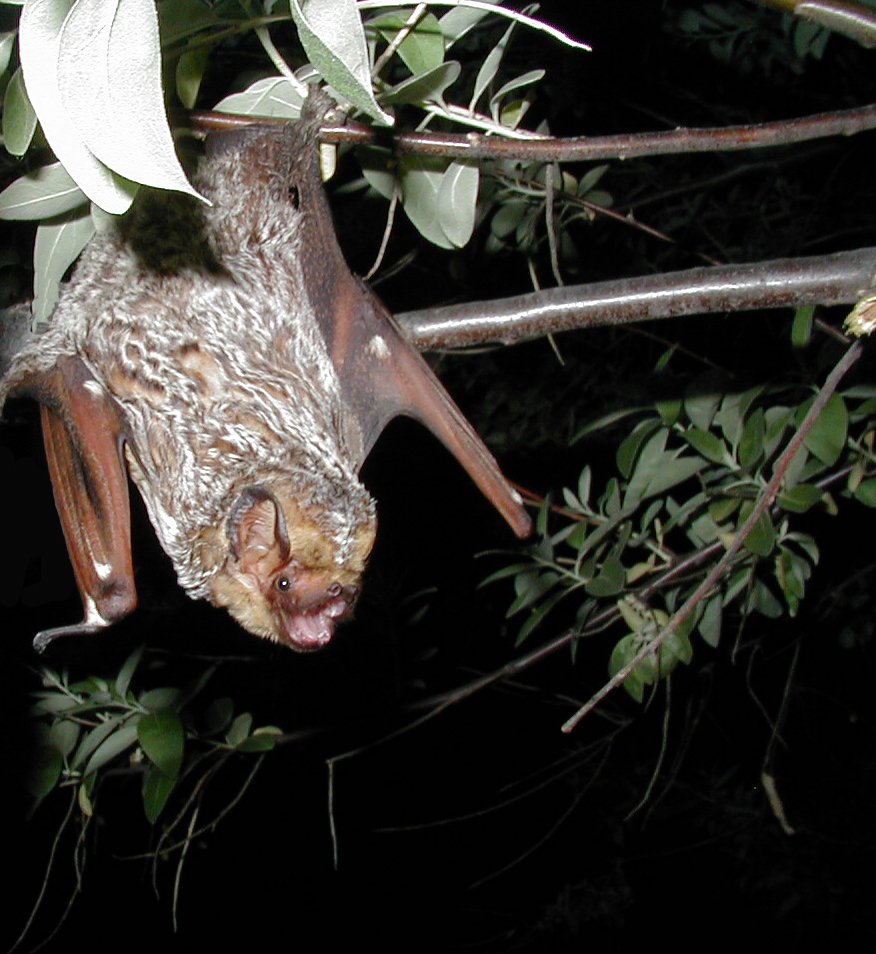
The Hoary bat

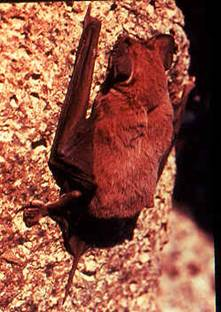
The Eastern red bat

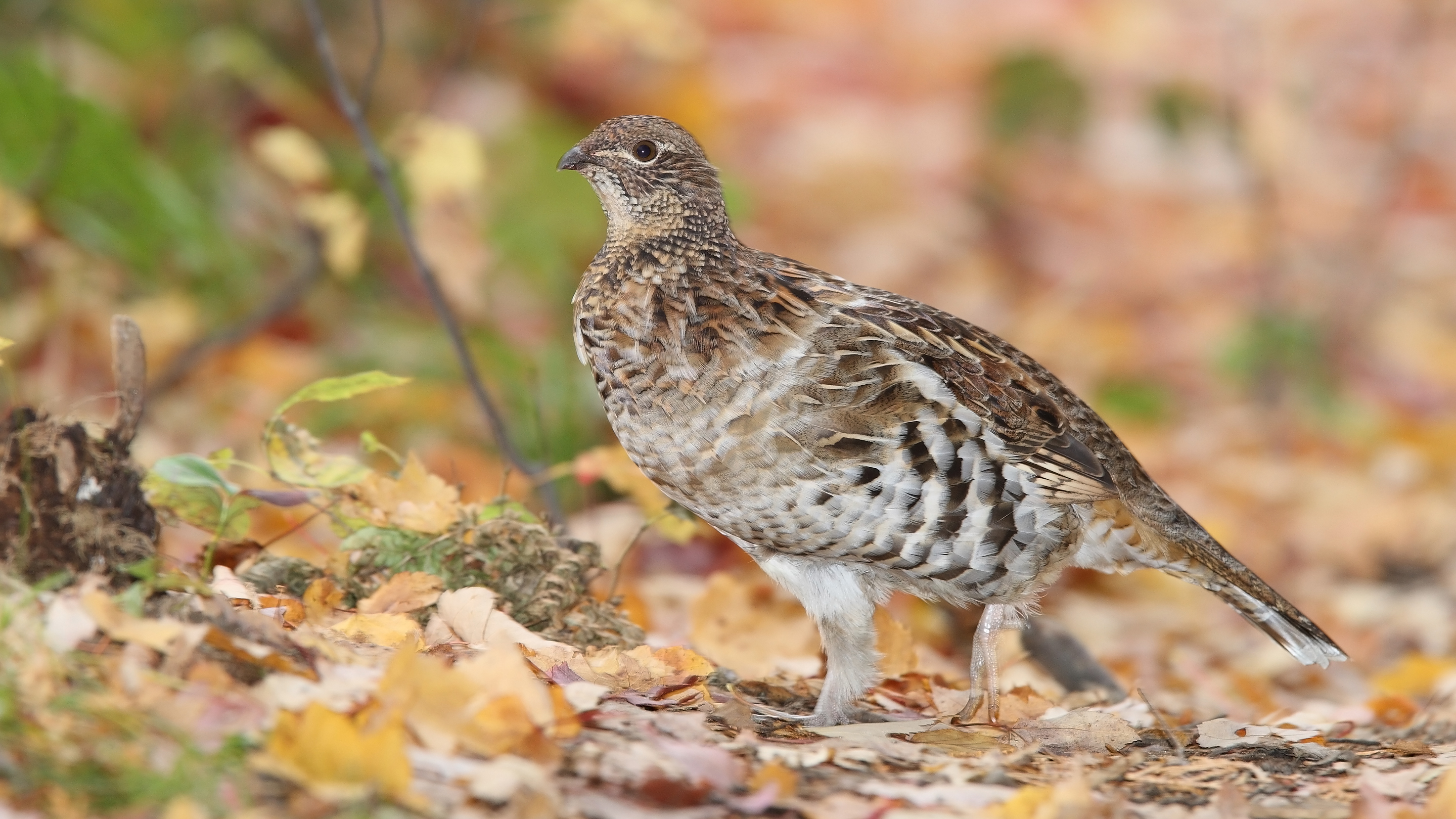
The Ruffed grouse

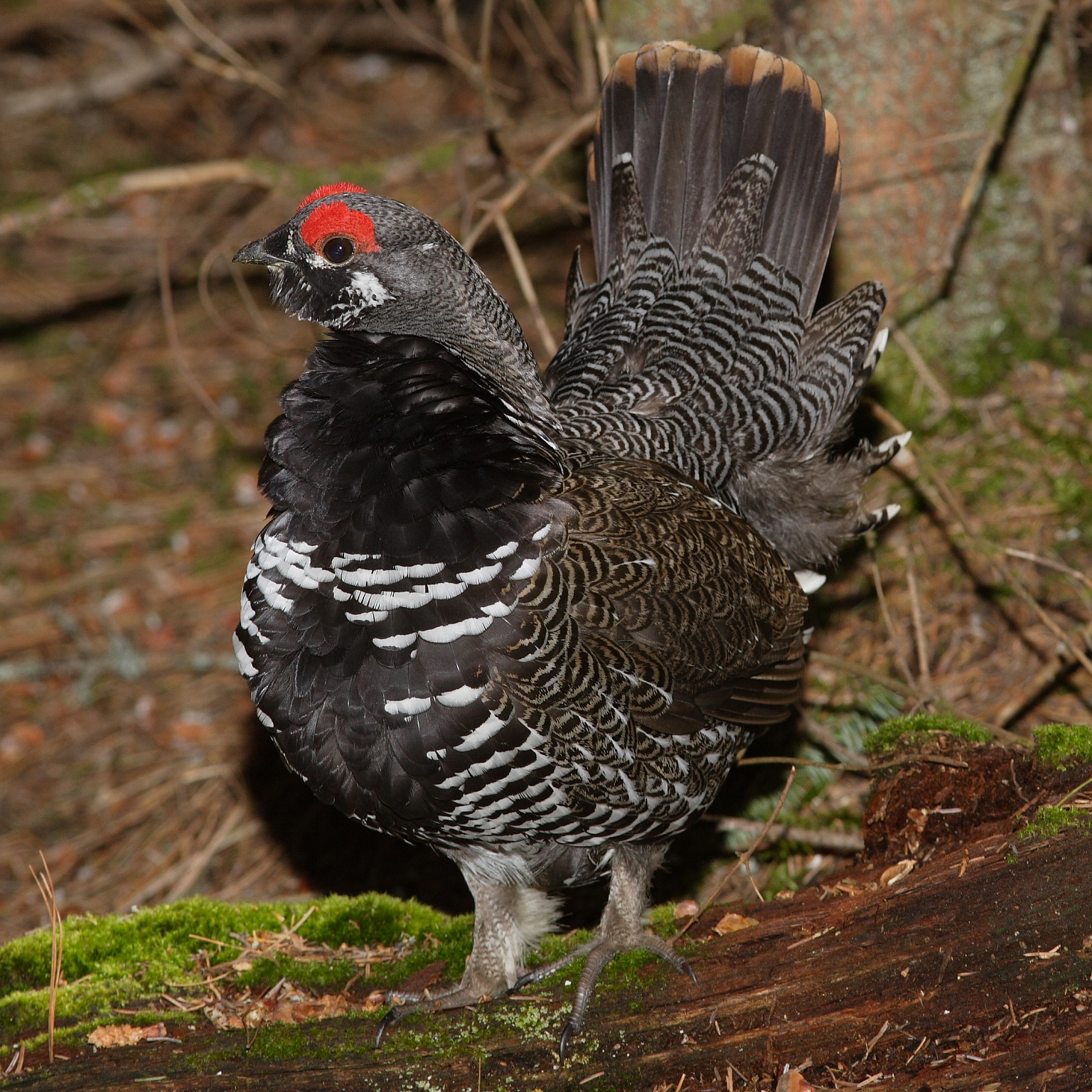
The Spruce grouse

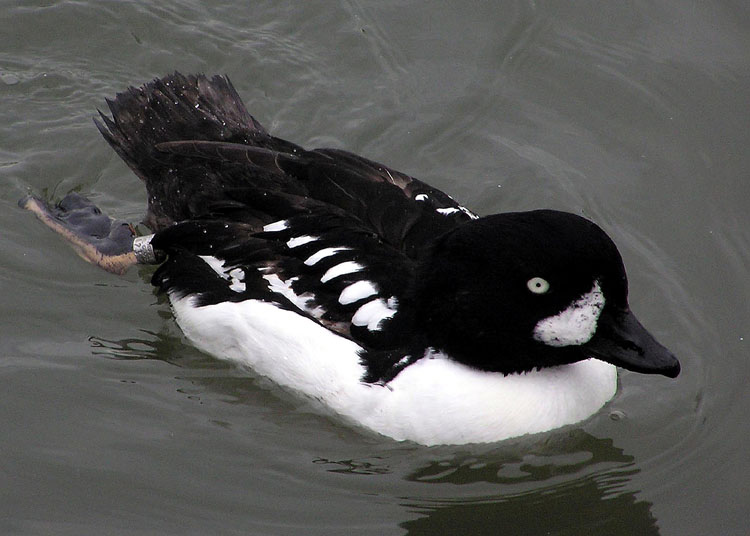
The Barrow's goldeneye

Among birds, the most common species would be the ruffed grouse (Bonasa umbellus) and the spruce grouse (Falcipennis canadensis), to which we can add the Barrow's goldeneye (Bucephala islandica).

Fish species include Atlantic salmon (Salmo salar) and anadromous brook trout (Salvelinus fontinalis). In addition to these two species, the Sainte-Marguerite is home to longnose dace (Rhinichthys cataractae), longnose sucker (Catostomus catostomus), white sucker (Catostomus commersoni) and American eel (Anguilla rostrata). Several lakes are inhabited only by freshwater brook trout, and many others are fishless.

=== Gallery ===
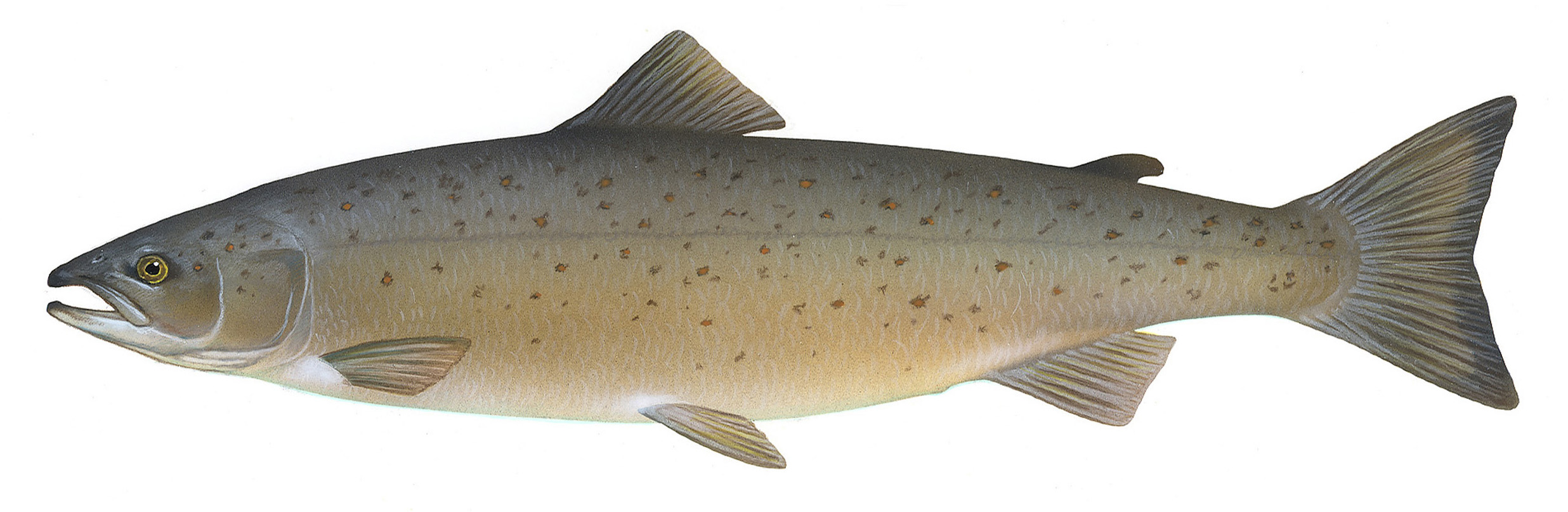
The Atlantic salmon

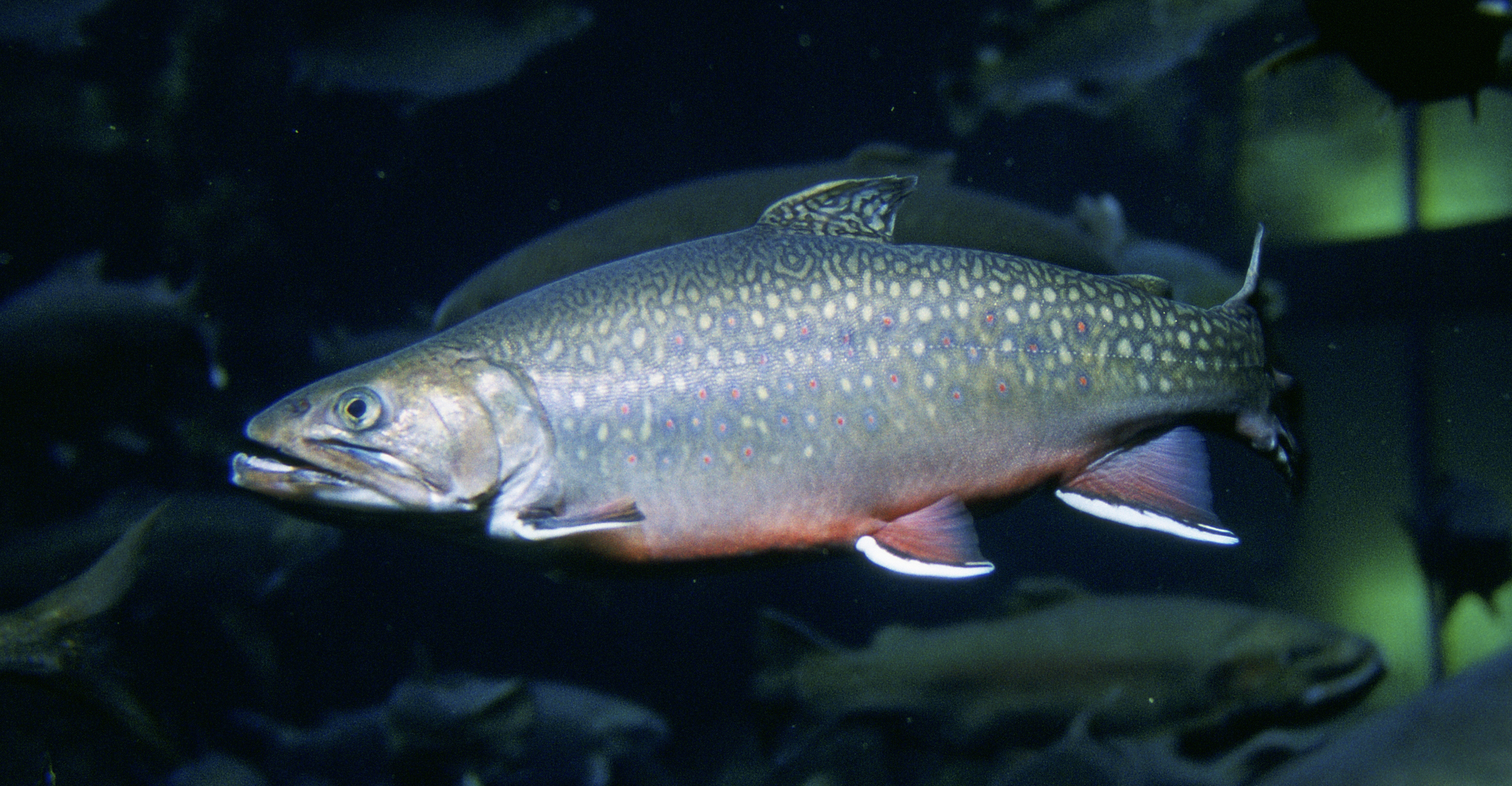
The Brook trout

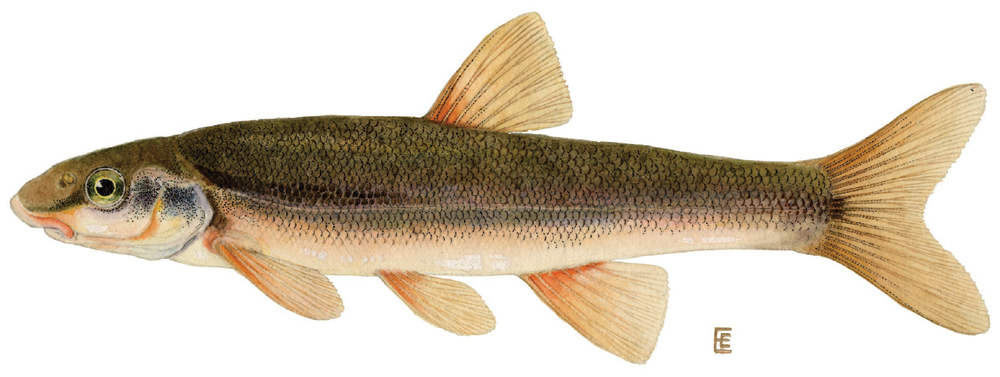
The Longnose dace

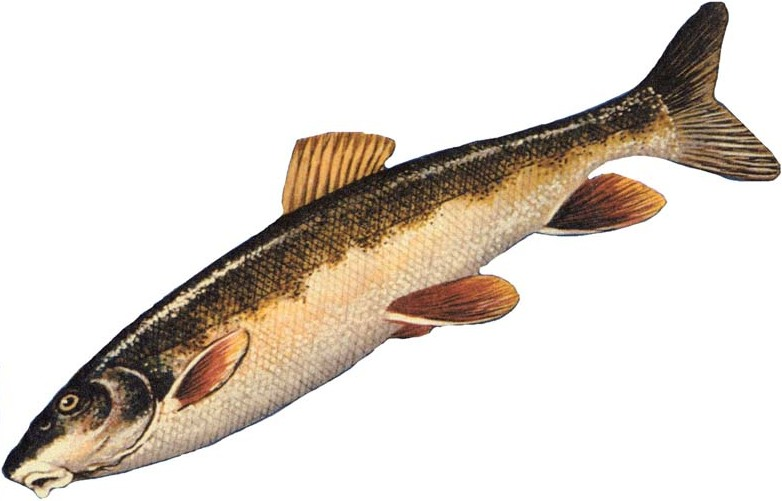
The Longnose sucker

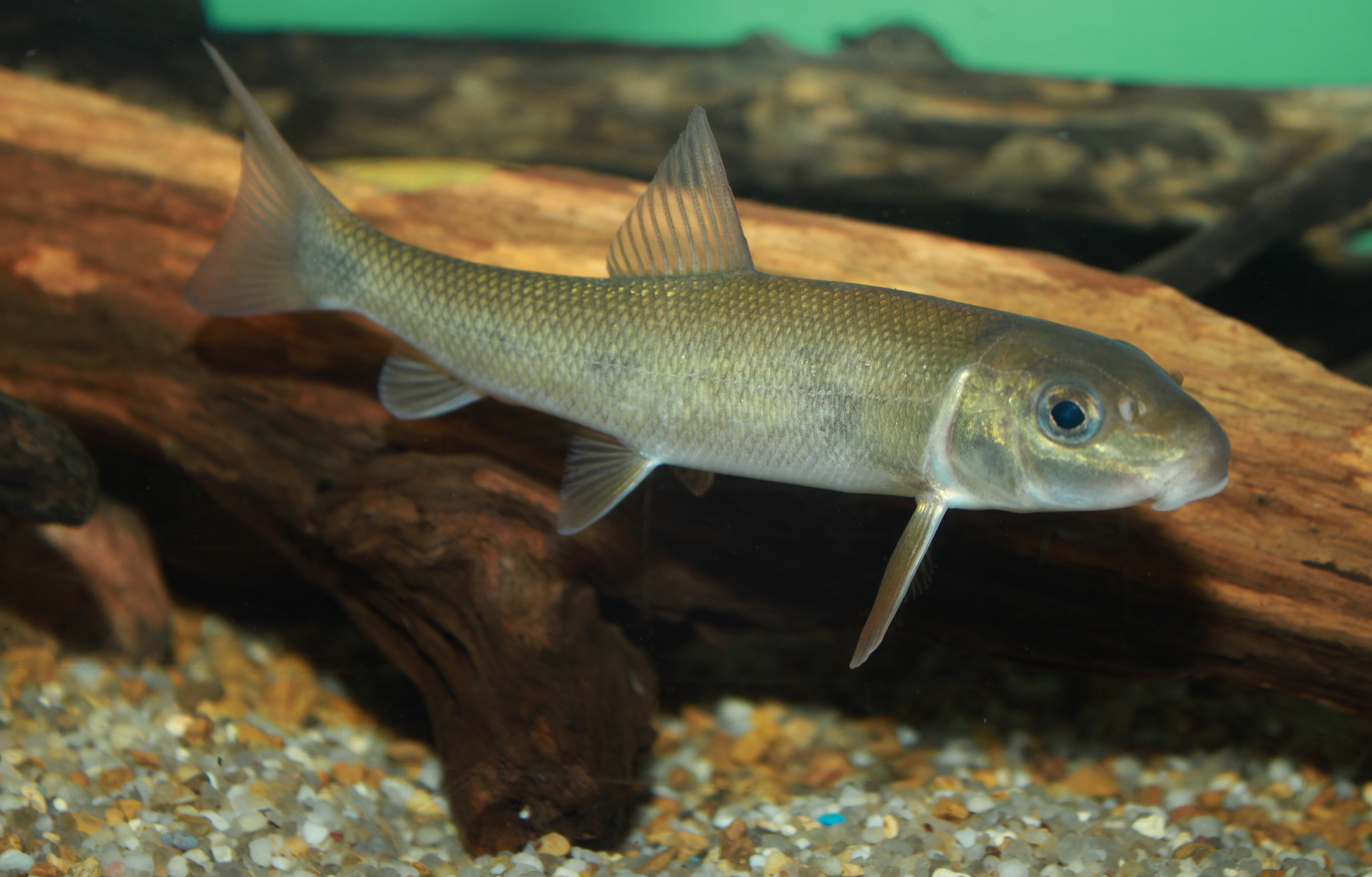
The White sucker

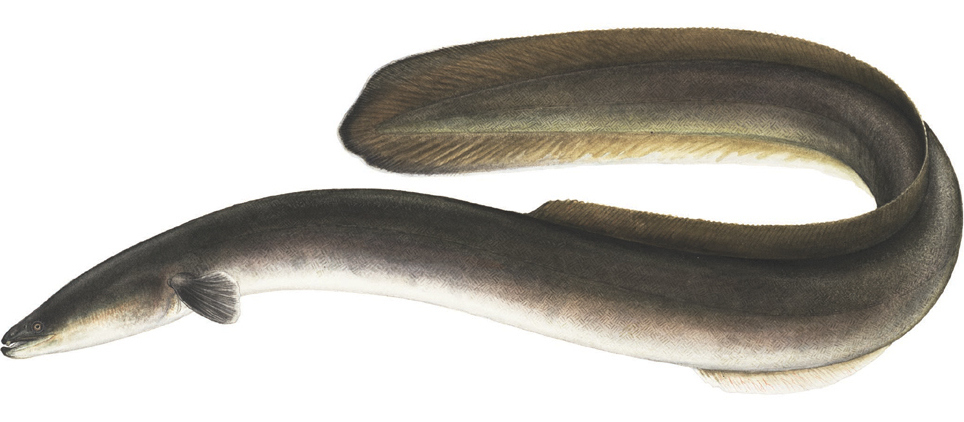
The American eel

== History ==
Before European colonization, the Sainte-Marguerite River was used by aboriginal peoples. According to archaeological data, Baie Sainte-Marguerite has been frequented since the Middle Archaic period, 8,000 AD. They came here mainly to hunt seals. It is currently within the traditional territory of the Innue Essipit, according to the 2004 Agreement-in-Principle of a General Nature between the First Nations of Mamuitun and Nutashkuan.

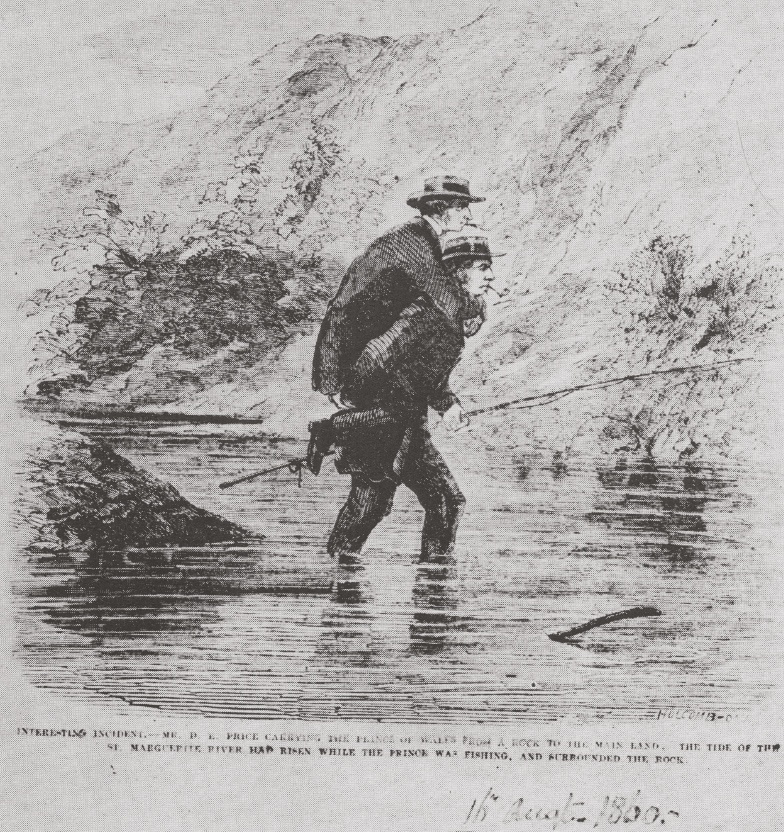
David Edward Price crossing the St Margaret's River with the Prince of Wales on his shoulders

Salmon fishing on the Sainte-Marguerite River has long been renowned. As early as 1838, the Hudson's Bay Company operated a fishing camp at its mouth. Between 1848 and 1853, James Grant, a clerk at the Tadoussac post, offered to accompany officers and visitors on the river. When the Tadoussac post closed in 1859, David Edward Price obtained a lease giving him exclusive rights to fish for salmon on the river. In 1860, a visit by Prince of Wales Albert Edward caused a stir in Bagotville, as he preferred to fish for salmon with David Edward Price rather than visit the people of Saguenay.

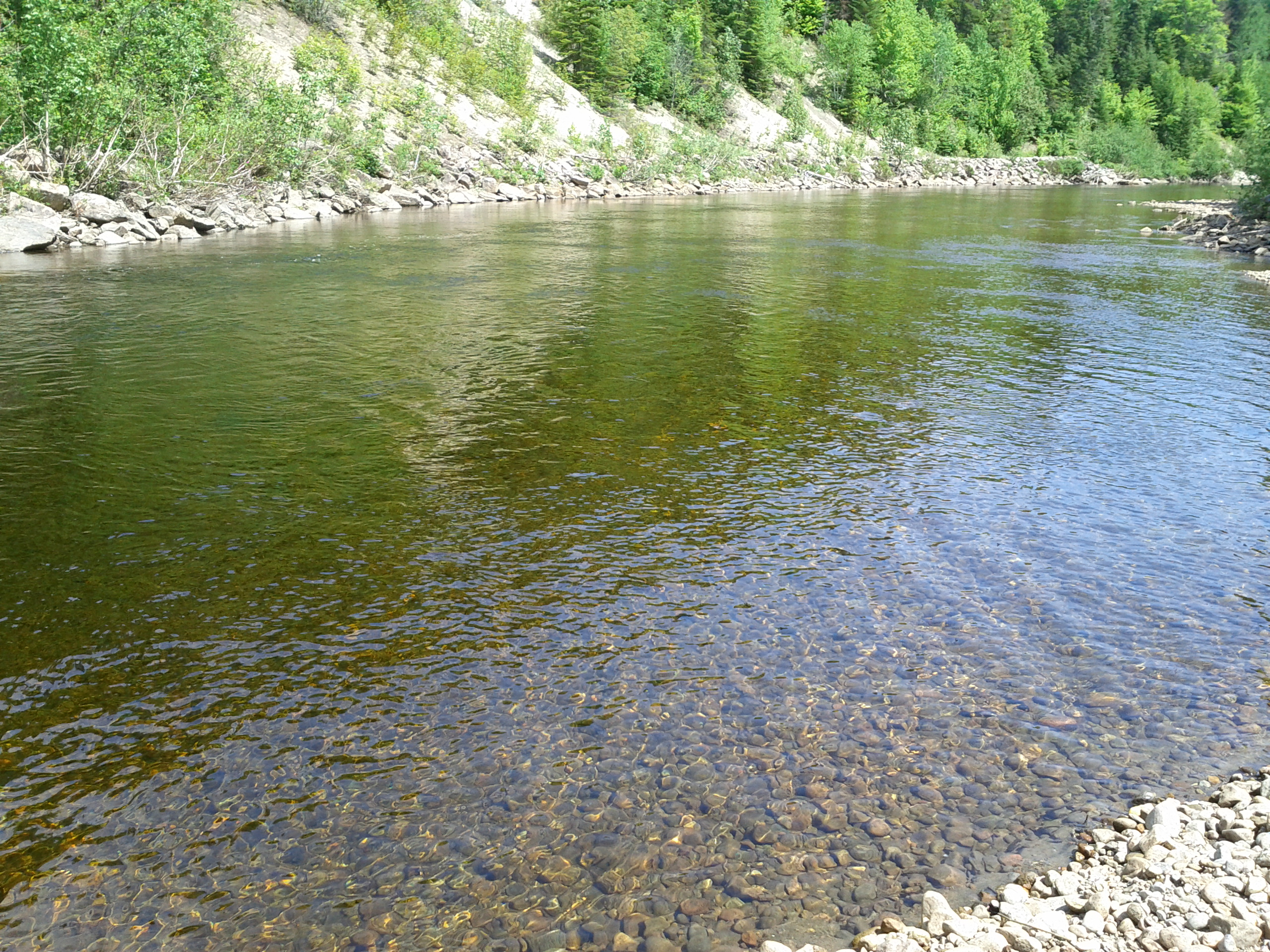
Salmon pool 54.

Willis Russell, a friend of Price's who was dazzled by the quality of the river's salmon fishing, traded him the rights to the main river for substantial timber quotas around 1870, and was already a shareholder in a hotel and owner of a house in Tadoussac. In 1872, in partnership with Robert Powell of Philadelphia, he built the Lower Fork House, also known as Club House Station. He built other fishing camps: Home Pool, six kilometers upstream, Le Château, five kilometers downstream, Sand's Pool, 13 km upstream, Bardsville, 11 km upstream, and finally, Upper Forks, renamed Grantville in honor of James Grant, 11 km from Bardsville.

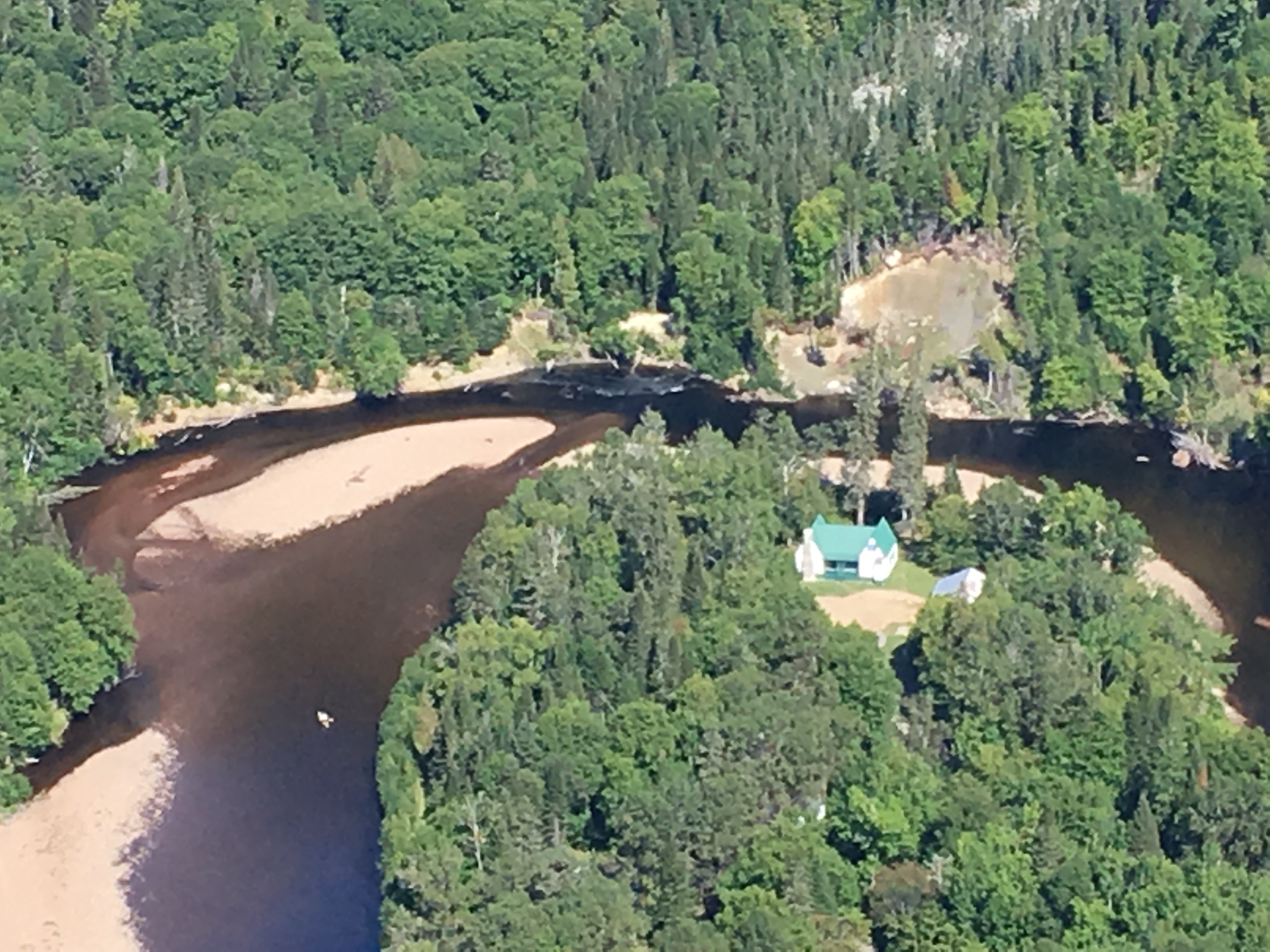
Bardsville Point fishing site.

In July 1885, the Quebec government passed the Fish and Wildlife Conservation Act, forcing Russell to form the Ste. Marguerite Salmon Club. That same year, the club was sold to James Grant and his associates of New York. As for the fishing guides, they came from the surrounding villages, which meant lucrative seasonal work. In 1974, the Quebec government renewed the lease on the Sainte-Marguerite for 5 years and on the Sainte-Marguerite Nord-Est for 9 years. The Zec de la Sainte-Marguerite was created in 1980, and the Corporation de pêche Sainte-Marguerite, which had held fishing rights since 1859, lost its exclusive rights. Management of the zec was given to the Association de la Sainte-Marguerite. The river is easily accessible via Route 172, which was completed in 1964.

Timeline of the reserve's creation

1. September 7th, 2005: Ministerial order for the creation of the proposed aquatic reserve by the Quebec government.
2. July 17th, 2009: Temporary protection status extended for 4 years.
3. February 13th 2012: Bureau d'audiences publiques sur l'environnement (BAPE) begins its mandate.
4. March and April 2012: BAPE public consultation in Saguenay.
5. July 20th, 2012: Consultation report published.
6. March 13th, 2013: Temporary protection status extended by 8 years.
7. May 13th, 2020: Granting of permanent protected area status.

On September 7, 2005, the Quebec government decreed the creation of the Sainte-Marguerite River Valley Aquatic Reserve. The temporary status was extended for a first four-year period in July 2009 and a second eight-year period in March 2013. The Office of Public Hearings on the Environment held a consultation in January 2012 concerning the creation of ten protected areas, including the Sainte-Marguerite Valley. The report was published on July 20, 2012. The Vallée-de-la-Rivière-Sainte-Marguerite aquatic reserve was finally created on May 13, 2020.

On March 24, 2022, following the adoption of the law amending the Act respecting the conservation of natural heritage and other provisions, which abolished aquatic reserves among other things, the reserve was subsequently reclassified as a biodiversity reserve.

== Activities and occupations ==
The reserve is located along Route 172, which runs for 40 km. This road, although excluded from the reserve, provides easy access to the various activity centers.

The Sainte-Marguerite River is renowned for its canoeing and kayaking. A Trans-Québec snowmobile trail crosses the reserve. There are also hiking trails on the west side, near Lac de la Roche. A footbridge has been built at Salmon Pool 53 on the Rivière Sainte-Marguerite to provide access to the bras des Murailles. Because of its steep terrain, there are seven climbing walls in the reserve. The Association de la rivière Sainte-Marguerite, which administers the Zec de la Sainte-Marguerite, offers accommodation near the river. Wilderness camping is also possible near eight salmon pools.

The reserve includes some 50 vacation leasehold properties on its territory. With the exception of Lac Résimond, most lots are located in the eastern part of the reserve. The reserve also covers fourteen non-native trappers' (Note: Trapper who is not a member of an indigenous peoples .) properties with exclusive rights. (Note: In Quebec, the exclusive right to trap is granted to a legal or natural person (or a group of legal or natural persons) to practice trapping on a territory, making the practice of such activity illegal for other persons on the said territory.)

== Bibliography ==
- ^{(fr)} Association de la rivière Sainte-Marguerite and Fédération québécoise pour le saumon atlantique, Plan de conservation du saumon atlantique et de développement durable de la pêche sportive de la rivière Sainte-Marguerite, Association de la rivière Sainte-Marguerite, 2019, 49 p. (read online archive [PDF]).
- ^{(fr)} Bureau d'audiences publiques sur l'environnement, Projets de réserves de biodiversité pour neuf territoires et de réserve aquatique pour un territoire dans la région administrative du Saguenay-Lac-Saint-Jean : rapport d'enquête et de consultation du public, Bureau d'audiences publiques sur l'environnement, 2012 (ISBN 978-2-550-65435-3, 2-550-65435-8, 978-2-550-65436-0, OCLC 819731630, read online archive [PDF]).
- ^{(fr)} Gouvernement du Québec, Plan de conservation, réserve aquatique de la Vallée-de-la-Rivière-Sainte-Marguerite, Québec, Ministère de l'Environnement et de la Lutte contre les changements climatiques, Direction des aires protégées, 2019, 24 p. (read online archive [PDF]).
