= Martin-Valin Lake =

Lake in Quebec, Canada

- Location within Quebec
- Location: Mont-Valin
- Coordinates: 48°39′07″N 70°47′14″W
- Primary inflows: Bras des Canots (coming upstream from Lac Moqueur)
- Primary outflows: Bras des Canots
- Basin countries: Canada
- Max. length: 6.5 kilometres (4.0 mi)
- Max. width: 0.5 kilometres (0.31 mi)
- Surface elevation: 671 metres (2,201 ft)

Lac Martin-Valin is a freshwater body of the watershed of bras des Canots, located on the north shore of the St. Lawrence River, in the unorganized territory of Mont-Valin, in the Le Fjord-du-Saguenay Regional County Municipality, in the administrative region of the Saguenay-Lac-Saint-Jean, in the province of Quebec, Canada.

The area of Lake Martin-Valin is included in the territory of Monts-Valin National Park. Recreational and tourist activities constitute the main economic activity in the sector. Forestry comes second.

Several secondary forest roads serve the bays and the surroundings of Lake Martin-Valin for the needs of recreational tourism activities.

The surface of Lake Martin-Valin is usually frozen from the end of November to the beginning of April, however the safe circulation on the ice is generally made from mid-December to the end of March.

== Geography ==
The main watersheds near Lake Martin-Valin are:

- North side: Moncouche Lake, Lake Poulin-De Courval, Laflamme Lake, Rivière aux Sables;
- East side: Sainte-Marguerite River, Jalobert Lake (Mont-Valin), Olaf River, Lac aux Canots, Le Grand Ruisseau;
- South side: Bras de l'Enfer, Valin River, Fournier Arm, Saguenay River;
- West side: Bras des Canots, Lac aux Canots, Saint-Louis River, North Arm, La Mothe Lake, Shipshaw River.

Lake Martin-Valin is located entirely in the forest in the unorganized territory of Mont-Valin, in Monts-Valin National Park. Lake Martin-Valin has a length of 6.5 kilometres (4.0 mi), a maximum width of 0.5 kilometres (0.31 mi) and an altitude of 671 metres (2,201 ft). This U-shaped stretch of water leaning westwards is characterized by ten islands and four bays on the South shore: one attached to the North shore stretching over 0.3 kilometres (0.19 mi) to the south with a length varying between 0.4 kilometres (0.25 mi) and 1.1 kilometres (0.68 mi).

The mouth of Lake Martin-Valin is located at:

- 2.6 kilometres (1.6 mi) Southeast of the summit of Mont Le Valinouët (altitude: 858 metres (2,815 ft));
- 7.9 kilometres (4.9 mi) North-East of the summit of mont Victor-Tremblay (altitude: 746 metres (2,448 ft));
- 10.6 kilometres (6.6 mi) North-East of the mouth of the Bras des Canots (confluence with the Valin River);
- 25.7 kilometres (16.0 mi) North-East of the mouth of the Valin River (confluence with the Saguenay River);
- 33.2 kilometres (20.6 mi) North-East of downtown Saguenay.

From the mouth of Lake Martin-Valin, the current follows the course of the arms of the Canots on 12.7 kilometres (7.9 mi) first towards the Southwest, to flow on the North bank of the Valin River. From there, the current follows the course of this last river successively, then from the Saguenay river to the St. Lawrence River.

== Toponymy ==
In the past, this body of water was designated "Second Canoe Lake".

The toponym "Lac Martin-Valin" was formalized on February 12, 1987, by the Commission de toponymie du Québec.

== Appendices ==
=== Related articles ===
- Bras des Canots, a stream
- Valin River, a stream
- Saguenay River, a stream
- Le Fjord-du-Saguenay Regional County Municipality
- Mont-Valin, an unorganized territory (Canada)
- Monts-Valin National Park
- List of lakes of Saguenay–Lac-Saint-Jean
