= Rivière aux Outardes (Saguenay River tributary) =

Rivière aux Outardes Anderson River

Location
- Country: Canada
- Province: Quebec
- Region: Saguenay–Lac-Saint-Jean
- MRC: Le Fjord-du-Saguenay Regional County Municipality

Physical characteristics
- Source: Lake Xavier
  - location: Lac-Croche, Capitale-Nationale
  - coordinates: 48.51084°N 70.84939°W
  - elevation: 232
- Mouth: Saguenay River
  - location: Saint-Fulgence, Saguenay–Lac-Saint-Jean
  - coordinates: 48.45444°N 70.91944°W
  - elevation: 4 m (13 ft)
- Length: 8.3 km (5.2 mi)

Basin features
- Tributaries
  - left: (from the mouth) Rivière aux Foins, Bedeau lake outlet
  - right: (from the mouth) Lac du Français and Lac Léon outlet

The Rivière aux Outardes (French pronunciation: [ʁivjɛʁ oz‿utaʁd], Bustard River) is a tributary of the Saguenay River, flowing in the municipality of Saint-Fulgence, in the Le Fjord-du-Saguenay Regional County Municipality, in the administrative region of Saguenay-Lac-Saint-Jean, in the province of Quebec, in Canada.

The route 172 (route de Tadoussac) crosses the Outardes River at its mouth. Chemin du rang Saint-Louis (north–south direction) serves the western side of this river.

Forestry is the primary economic activity in the sector; recreational tourism, second.

The surface of the Outardes River is usually frozen from the end of November to the beginning of April, however the safe circulation on the ice is generally done from mid-December to the end of March.

== Geography ==
The main watersheds neighboring the Rivière aux Outardes are:

- North side: Valin River, Saint-Louis River, Canada stream;
- East side: Rivière aux Foins, Saguenay River, Sainte-Marguerite River;
- South side: Saguenay River;
- West side: Loutre river, Valin River, Caribou River, Shipshaw River.

The Rivière aux Outardes rises at the mouth of Lake Xavier (length: 1.9 kilometres (1.2 mi); altitude: 232 metres (761 ft)). This lake is located: 2.4 kilometres (1.5 mi) south of the course of Le Petit Bras and 8.0 metres (26.2 ft) to the northeast from the mouth of the Outardes river.

From its source, the confluence of Lake Xavier, the course of the Outardes River descends on 8.3 kilometres (5.2 mi) according to the following segments:

- 1.8 kilometres (1.1 mi) to the southwest in a deep valley, crossing Lake Travers on 0.5 kilometres (0.31 mi) to the west, collecting the discharge (coming from the East) from Bedeau Lake and crossing another unidentified lake on 0.4 kilometres (0.25 mi) south, to its mouth;
- 2.0 kilometres (1.2 mi) south-west to chemin du rang Sainte-Marie;
- 2.8 kilometres (1.7 mi) south-west in a deep valley, to a stream (coming from the north);
- 1.7 kilometres (1.1 mi) south in a deep valley, to the mouth of the river

The mouth of the Rivière aux Outardes flows onto the north bank of the Saguenay River in the municipality of Saint-Fulgence. This confluence of the Rivière aux Outardes is located at:

- 1.3 kilometres (0.81 mi) west of the village center of Saint-Fulgence;
- 11.8 kilometres (7.3 mi) north-east of downtown Saguenay;
- 94.7 kilometres (58.8 mi) west of the mouth of the Saguenay River.

From the mouth of the Outardes river, the current follows the course of the Saguenay river up to Tadoussac where it merges with the Saint-Laurent river.

== Toponymie ==
The toponym Rivière aux Outardes was formalized on December 5, 1968, at the Place Names Bank of the Commission de toponymie du Québec.

== See also ==
- Le Fjord-du-Saguenay Regional County Municipality
- Saint-Fulgence
- Saguenay River
