= Bras du Nord (Valin River tributary) =

River in Saguenay-Lac-Saint-Jean, Quebec, Canada

- Location within Quebec

Location
- Country: Canada
- Province: Quebec
- Region: Saguenay–Lac-Saint-Jean
- Regional County Municipality: Le Fjord-du-Saguenay Regional County Municipality
- Municipalities: Mont-Valin (TNO) and Saint-David-de-Falardeau

Physical characteristics
- Source: Mountain creek
  - location: Mont-Valin, MRC Le Fjord-du-Saguenay Regional County Municipality
  - coordinates: 48°49′30″N 71°02′57″W
  - elevation: 389 m (1,276 ft)
- Mouth: Valin River
  - location: Saint-David-de-Falardeau
  - coordinates: 48°33′46″N 70°59′44″W
  - elevation: 180 m (590 ft)
- Length: 30.6 km (19.0 mi)
- Discharge
  - location: Saint-David-de-Falardeau

Basin features
- Tributaries
  - left: (Upward from the mouth) Décharge du Lac à Pit, Bras de Fer, ruisseau Roméo, décharge du Lac de la Tente, décharge d’un ensemble de lacs, lac de la Hache.
  - right: (Upward from the mouth) Décharge du lac Guylaine, décharge d’un ensemble de lacs dont Mial, des Copains et Limony, décharge du lac Léandre et du Lac de la Vase, ruisseau Légaré, décharge des Lacs Jumeaux, décharge du Lac de la Truite, décharege du Lac Caché, ruisseau Bérubé.

The Bras du Nord is a tributary of the Valin River, flowing in the unorganized territory of Mont-Valin and in the municipality of Saint-David-de-Falardeau, in the Le Fjord-du-Saguenay Regional County Municipality, in the administrative region of Saguenay–Lac-Saint-Jean, in Quebec, in Canada. The course of the Bras du Nord flows in the canton of Falardeau.

A secondary forest road serves the southwest bank of the Bras du Nord valley and the lakes upstream; other secondary forest roads have been developed in the sector for the needs of forestry and recreational tourism activities.

The surface of the North Arm is usually frozen from the end of November to the beginning of April, however the safe circulation on the ice is generally done from mid-December to the end of March.

== Geography ==
The main neighboring watersheds of the Bras du Nord are:

- North side: Nisipi River, Saint-Louis River, rivière à la Hache;
- East side: Saint-Louis River, Valin river, Bras des Canots;
- South side: Caribou River, Saguenay River, Michaud River (Saguenay River), Shipshaw River;
- West side: Lac La Mothe, rivière à l'Ours, Blanche River, Shipshaw River.

The North Arm takes its source at the mouth of a mountain stream (altitude: 389 metres (1,276 ft)). This source is located 4.0 kilometres (2.5 mi) east of the Baie de la Brûlée du Lac La Mothe, 8.4 kilometres (5.2 mi) southeast of the dam at the mouth of Onatchiway Lake, 15.4 kilometres (9.6 mi) to the North-East of the dam at the mouth of lac La Mothe, 27.0 kilometres (16.8 mi) in the North-East of the mouth of Bras du Nord, 22.2 kilometres (13.8 mi) West of Moncouche Lake (Mont-Valin) and 43.1 kilometres (26.8 mi) North of Saguenay River.

From its source, the course of the Bras du Nord descends on 30.6 kilometres (19.0 mi) according to the following segments:

- 5.5 kilometres (3.4 mi) south-east, up to the Bérubé stream (coming from the north-west);
- 9.0 kilometres (5.6 mi) towards the South-East, up to the Romeo stream (coming from the North-East);
- 3.8 kilometres (2.4 mi) towards the Southeast, up to the stream bras de Fer (coming from the East);
- 8.1 kilometres (5.0 mi) towards the South-West, by forming a curve by skirting a mountain to redirect towards the South-East, until the discharge (coming from the West) of a set of lakes;
- 4.2 kilometres (2.6 mi) south-east, to the mouth of the river.

The mouth of the Bras du Nord spills onto the west bank of the Valin River at the foot of the Chute à Banc d'oeuvre. This mouth is located at:

- 11.4 kilometres (7.1 mi) North-West of the mouth of the Valin River (confluence with the Saguenay River);
- 16.5 kilometres (10.3 mi) north of downtown Saguenay;
- 104.9 kilometres (65.2 mi) West of the mouth of the Saguenay River.

From the mouth of the Bras du Nord, the current follows the course of the Valin River, then the course of the Saguenay River up to Tadoussac where it merges with the St. Lawrence River.

== Toponymy ==
Formerly, this watercourse was designated "Rivière Falardeau", which was associated with the township of Falardeau, in Saguenay-Lac-Saint-Jean. The name of this old toponym evokes the career of the painter Antoine-Sébastien Falardeau (Cap-Santé, August 13, 1822 - Florence, Italy, July 14, 1889); Falardeau had a career mainly in Italy, his second homeland. Falardeau was above all dedicated to making excellent copies of great masters of painting. His training as a painter is little known; he took painting lessons and was apprenticed as a sign painter with Robert Clow Todd in 1841 in Quebec.

It is possible that the Italian painter G. Fassio, who had been staying in this city since 1835, oriented him towards Italy and taught him the basics of Italian. In 1846 Falardeau left Quebec for Florence. After difficult years, his reputation was established: Charles III, Duke of Parma, appointed him knight of the order of Saint Louis, January 17, 1852. He married Caterina Manucci-Benincasa, daughter of the Marquis Francesco Mannucci-Benincasa Capponi, in 1861, with whom he had at least three children.

In 1862 and 1882, he returned to Canada briefly and exhibited his paintings there. The Canadian government commissioned him in 1882 to paint a portrait of Joseph-Adolphe Chapleau, a former premier of the province of Quebec. He accidentally dies in Florence, his horse, wrapped up, having thrown him into the river. The dispersion of his paintings made it impossible to study in depth his work. The Musée du Québec, however, has twenty.

The toponym "Bras du Nord" was formalized on April 8, 1975, at the Place Names Bank of the Commission de toponymie du Québec, that is to say at the creation of this commission.

== Notes and references ==
=== See also ===
- Le Fjord-du-Saguenay Regional County Municipality
- Mont-Valin, an unorganized territory
- Saint-David-de-Falardeau, a municipality
- Bras de Fer (bras du Nord), a stream
- Valin River, a watercourse
- Saguenay River
- St. Lawrence River
- List of rivers of Quebec
