= G.-Oscar-Villeneuve Ecological Reserve =

Coordinates: 48.475°N 70.5149°W

- IUCN category Ia (strict nature reserve)
- Interactive map of G.-Oscar-Villeneuve Ecological Reserve
- Location: Mont-Valin, Le Fjord-du-Saguenay Regional County Municipality, Québec, Canada
- Established: June 21, 1989

G.-Oscar-Villeneuve Ecological Reserve is an ecological reserve of Quebec, Canada. It was established on June 21, 1989 and is located near Saint-Fulgence and Sainte-Rose-du-Nord, north of the Saguenay River, to the northeast of the La Baie section of Saguenay.
