= Sainte-Marguerite River =

Sainte-Marguerite River may refer to:

- Sainte-Marguerite River (Saguenay), a tributary of the Saguenay River
- Sainte-Marguerite River (Sept-Îles), a tributary of the Saint Lawrence, damned by the Denis-Perron dam
