= Bras du Nord =

Bras du Nord may refer to:

- Bras du Nord (Valin River tributary), Le Fjord-du-Saguenay Regional County Municipality, Saguenay–Lac-Saint-Jean, Quebec, Canada
- Bras du Nord (Sainte-Anne River tributary), river in Saint-Raymond, Portneuf Regional County Municipality, Capitale-Nationale, Quebec, Canada
- Bras du Nord, a tributary of the Machiche River in Quebec, Canada; see List of rivers of Quebec#North shore of St Lawrence river – between Repentigny and Trois-Rivières
- Bras du Nord-Ouest, a tributary of the Rivière du Gouffre in Capitale-Nationale, Quebec, Canada
