= Saint-Louis River (Valin River tributary) =

Location
- Country: Canada
- Province: Quebec
- Region: Saguenay-Lac-Saint-Jean
- MRC: Le Fjord-du-Saguenay Regional County Municipality

Physical characteristics
- Source: Unidentified lake
  - location: Mont-Valin
  - coordinates: 48.77013°N 70.74027°W
  - elevation: 69129
- Mouth: Valin River
  - location: Saint-David-de-Falardeau
  - coordinates: 48.73944°N 71.13805°W
  - elevation: 255 m (837 ft)
- Length: 48.9 km (30.4 mi)

Basin features
- Tributaries
  - left: (upstream) Lake Daniel outlet, Raquette stream, outlet from an unidentified lake, Women stream, Le Gros Ruisseau, outlet from an unidentified lake, outlet from Lac de la Valeur, outlet from a set of unidentified lakes, outlet of Taquart lake, outlet of an unidentified lake, outlet of unidentified lakes (via Croteau lake).
  - right: (upstream) Savard Creek, outlet of the Cage de Tôle Lake, Alcide stream, Vimy stream, discharge of a set of unidentified lakes, Cécile stream, unidentified lake discharge (via Croteau Lake), discharge of a non-lake identified (via Lac Croteau), discharge from two unidentified lakes.

The Saint-Louis River is a tributary of the Valin River, flowing on the northwest shore of the Saint Lawrence River, in the unorganized territory of Mont-Valin and the municipality of Saint-David-de-Falardeau, in the Le Fjord-du-Saguenay Regional County Municipality, in the administrative region of Saguenay-Lac-Saint-Jean, in the Province of Quebec, in Canada.

The forest road R0201 serves most of the hydrographic slope of the Saint-Louis River, for the needs of forestry and recreational tourism activities. The mouth of this river flows to the northwest limit of the Monts-Valin National Park.

Forestry is the main economic activity in the sector; recreational tourism, second.

The surface of the Saint-Louis River is usually frozen from the end of November to the beginning of April, however the safe circulation on the ice is generally made from mid-December to the end of March.

== Geography ==
The main watersheds neighboring the Saint-Louis River are:

- North side: Nisipi River, Shipshaw River, Tête Blanche River, Onatchiway Lake, Little Onatchiway Lake;
- East side: Martin-Valin Lake, Sainte-Marguerite River, North Arm, Moncouche lake;
- South side: Valin River, Shipshaw River, rivière des Outardes, North arm, Canoe arms, arm of Hell, Fournier Arm;
- West side: canoe arms, Lake La Mothe, Étienne River, Tchitogama Lake, White River, Shipshaw River, Péribonka River.

The Saint-Louis River takes its source from an unidentified lake (length: 1.7 metres (5 ft 7 in); altitude: 691 metres (2,267 ft)). A mountain peak in the southwest reaches 800 metres (2,600 ft) of elevation. This source is located in the unorganized territory of Mont-Valin at:

- 2.0 kilometres (1.2 mi) West of Moncouche Lake;
- 18.7 kilometres (11.6 mi) South-West of lake Poulin-De Courval;
- 24.2 metres (79 ft)) east of a bay of La Mothe lake which is crossed to the south by the Shipshaw River;
- 38.9 kilometres (24.2 mi) North of the mouth of the Valin River (confluence with the Saguenay River).

From the head lake, the Saint-Louis River flows over 48.9 kilometres (30.4 mi), entirely in the forest zone, according to the following segments:

Upper course of the Saint-Louis River (segment of 28.6 kilometres (17.8 mi))

- 2.9 kilometres (1.8 mi) towards the North, then towards the West by crossing Lac Croteau (length: 1.6 kilometres (0.99 mi); altitude: 627 metres (2,057 ft)) on its full length to its mouth;
- 3.5 kilometres (2.2 mi) westwards, up to a bend in the river;
- 5.6 kilometres (3.5 mi) towards the South-West by meandering, up to the Céline stream (coming from the North);
- 16.6 kilometres (10.3 mi) towards the South-West, then the South by collecting Le Gros Ruisseau at the end of the segment and meandering up to the women's stream (coming from the East);

Lower course of the Saint-Louis River (segment of 20.3 kilometres (12.6 mi))

- 10.5 kilometres (6.5 mi) towards the South-East by collecting the stream at Vimy (coming from the West) and the stream Alcide (coming from the West), up to the stream at La Raquette (coming from the Northeast);
- 5.3 kilometres (3.3 mi) towards the south by crossing Savard Falls at the end of the segment, up to Savard stream (coming from the West);
- 4.5 kilometres (2.8 mi) towards the South-East by entering the municipality of Saint-David-de-Falardeau and by forming a loop towards the North-East at the end of the segment, until the mouth of the river.

The Saint-Louis River flows at the bottom of a small bay on the west bank of the Valin River. This mouth is located at:

- 23.4 kilometres (14.5 mi) Southeast of La Mothe lake which is crossed by the Shipshaw River;
- 21.7 kilometres (13.5 mi) north of downtown Saguenay;
- 14.9 kilometres (9.3 mi) North of the mouth of the Valin River;
- 100.8 kilometres (62.6 mi) West of the mouth of the Saguenay River (confluence with the St. Lawrence River).

== Toponymy ==
The term "Saint-Louis" is a family name of French origin.

The toponym of “Saint-Louis River” was formalized on December 5, 1968, at the Place Names Bank of the Commission de toponymie du Québec.

== See also ==
- Saint-David-de-Falardeau, a municipality
- Mont-Valin, a TNO
- Le Fjord-du-Saguenay Regional County Municipality
- Saguenay River, a stream
- List of rivers of Quebec

== Notes and references ==
=== External links ===
- Official site of the MRC Le Fjord-du-Saguenay
