= Saint-Martin Dam =

- Interactive map of Saint-Martin Dam
- Official name: Barrage Saint-Martin
- Location: Mont-Valin, Le Fjord-du-Saguenay Regional County Municipality, Quebec, Canada
- Coordinates: 49°16′50″N 70°52′32″W
- Owner: Government of Quebec

Saint-Martin Dam is a dam in Mont-Valin, Quebec, Canada, in the administrative region of Saguenay–Lac-Saint-Jean and the regional county municipality of Le Fjord-du-Saguenay.

== Other dams with this name ==
- Barrage Saint-Martin in 32000 Auch, Gers, France
- Barrage Saint-Martin in 89100 Sens, Yonne, France
- Saint-Martin Dam near the village of Quartier Militaire in Mauritius.
