= Sainte-Marguerite Bay =

Body of water located on the Saguenay River, Quebec

- Location in Québec, Canada Sainte-Marguerite Bay (Canada)
- Location: Québec, Canada
- Coordinates: 48°15′31″N 69°57′33″W
- Max. length: 2.7 km (1.7 mi)

The Sainte-Marguerite Bay is a body of water located on the Saguenay River, at the confluence of the Sainte-Marguerite, in the municipality of Sacré-Cœur, in the regional county municipality (RCM) of La Haute-Côte-Nord, in the administrative region of Côte-Nord, Quebec, Canada.

== Geography ==
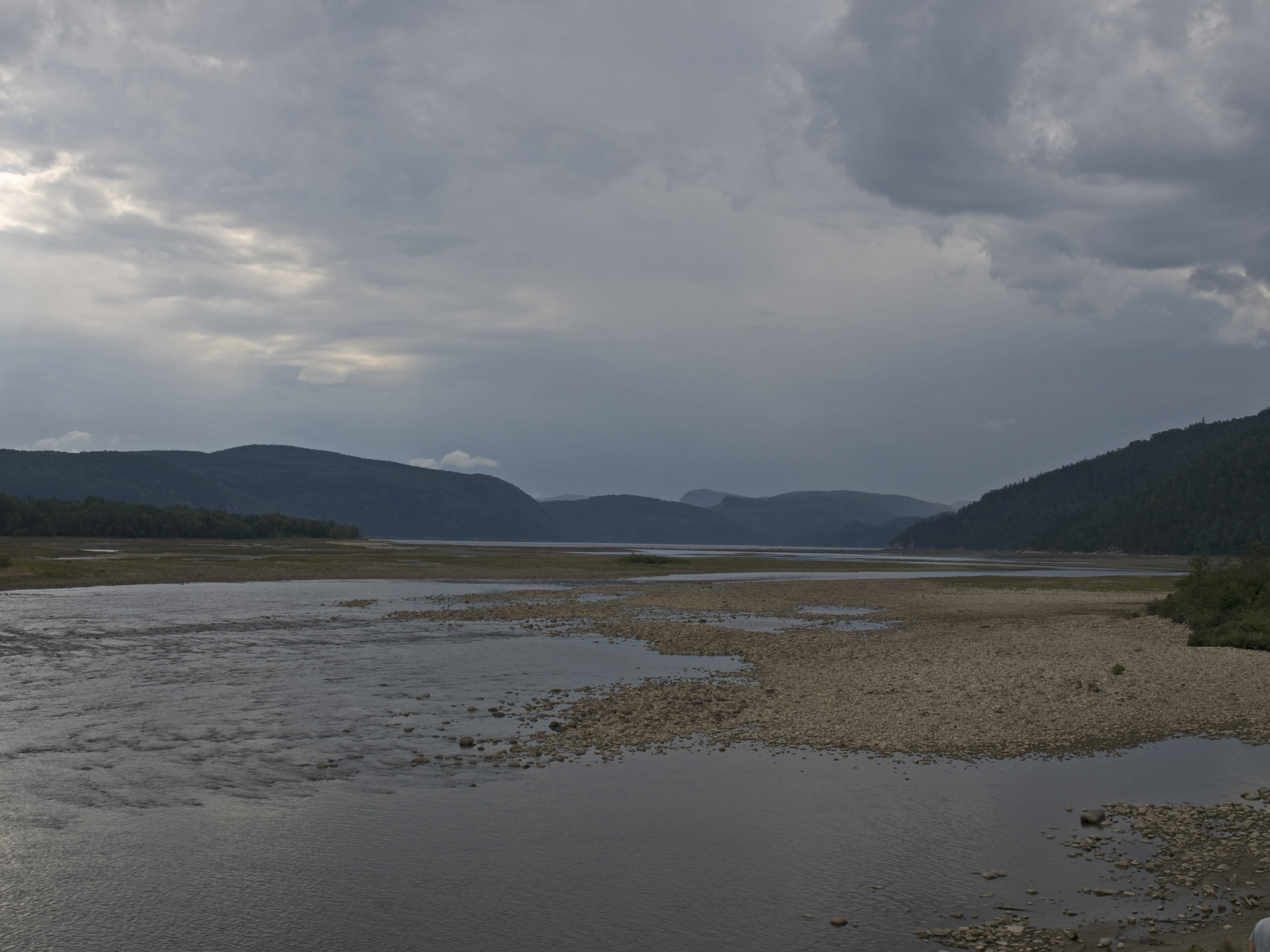
Sainte-Marguerite Bay.

The Sainte-Marguerite Bay is located on the left bank of the Saguenay River, 25 km (by river) upstream from the Tadoussac ferry. The bay lies opposite Cap de l'Anse au Cheval (on the south shore of the Saguenay River). With a length of 2.7 km and a width of 1.3 km, the bay extends in an east-west direction. The entrance to the bay is located between two 320 m-high rocky capes, including Cap Sainte-Marguerite (on the south side). The area known as “Bay Mill” is located on the southeast side of the bay.

Sainte-Marguerite Bay is characterized by stony, sandy shoals that appear at low tide. The riverbed crosses these shoals.

== Toponymy ==
Explorer Samuel de Champlain was the first to officially name the Sainte-Marguerite River in 1603 during an exploratory voyage. The name of the bay is derived from name from the river.

The toponym “Sainte-Marguerite Bay” appears on the map of Albert Township, drawn up shortly after 1883. (Note: Source: "Noms et lieux du Québec," a work by the Commission de toponymie du Québec, published in 1994 and 1996 as a printed illustrated dictionary, and in 1997 as a CD-ROM produced by Micro-Intel, based on this dictionary.)

The toponym “Sainte-Marguerite Bay” was officialized on December 5, 1968, in the Place Name Bank of the Commission de toponymie du Québec.

== History ==
Settlement around Sainte-Marguerite Bay began in 1840. A large sawmill was built at the site known as Bay Mill. The area's economy developed through forestry, agriculture, fishing, and recreational tourism.

The bay is known for salmon and trout fishing. The bay is also a nursery for the St. Lawrence beluga whale herd.
