= Quebec Route 172 =

Highway in Quebec, Canada

Route 172

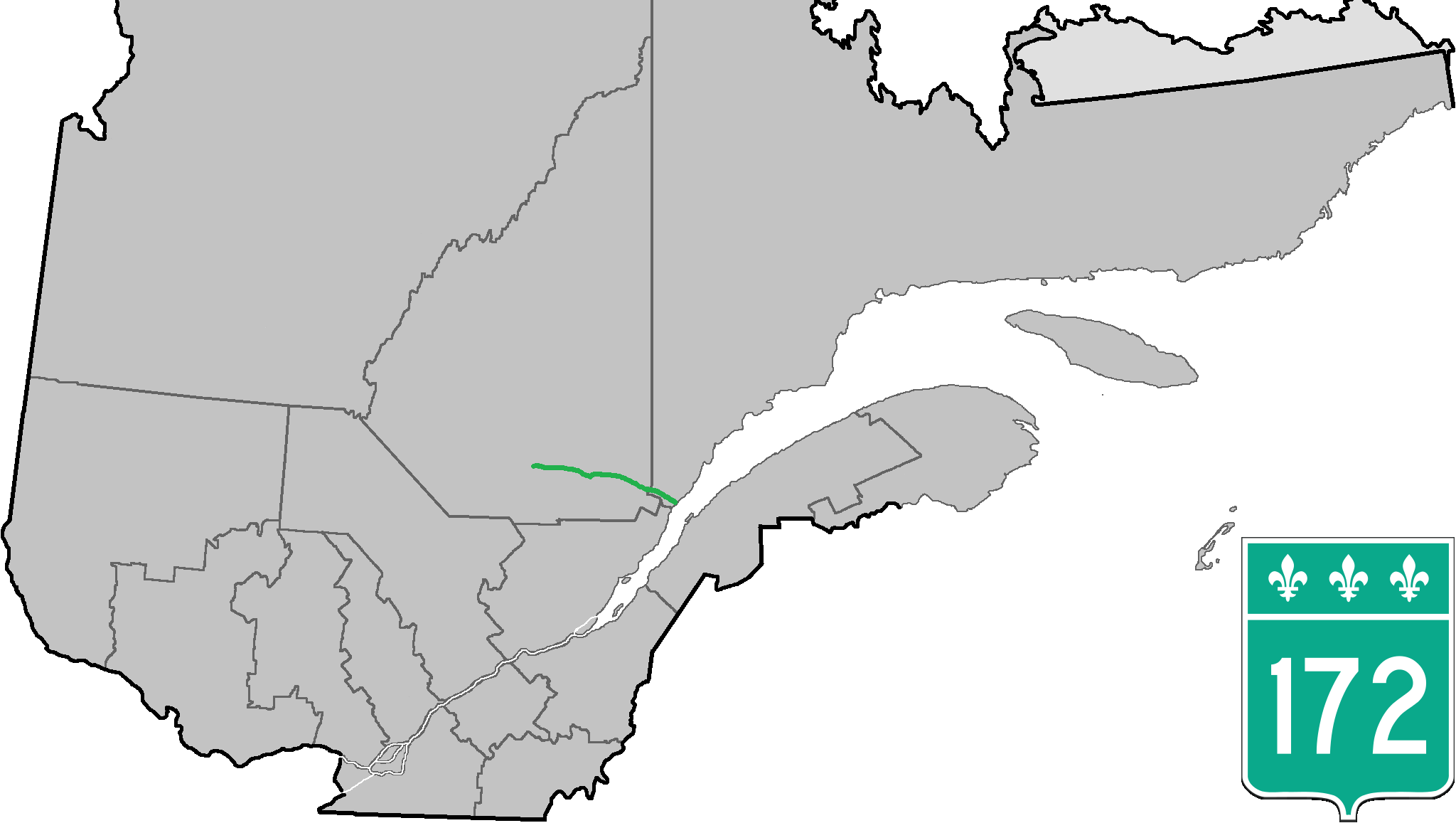

Route information
- Maintained by Transports Québec
- Length: 169.1 km (105.1 mi)

Major junctions
- West end: R-169 in Saint-Nazaire
- R-175 in Saguenay
- East end: R-138 in Tadoussac

Location
- Country: Canada
- Province: Quebec
- Major cities: Saguenay, Saint-Ambroise, Saint-Fulgence

Highway system
- Quebec provincial highways; Autoroutes; List; Former
← R-171	→ R-173

Route 172 is an east–west highway on the north shore of the St. Lawrence River in Quebec, Canada, and it parallels the Saguenay River on the north side of it. The western terminus of Route 172 is in Saint-Nazaire at the junction of Route 169, and the eastern terminus is in Tadoussac, at the junction of Route 138.

== Municipalities along Route 172 ==
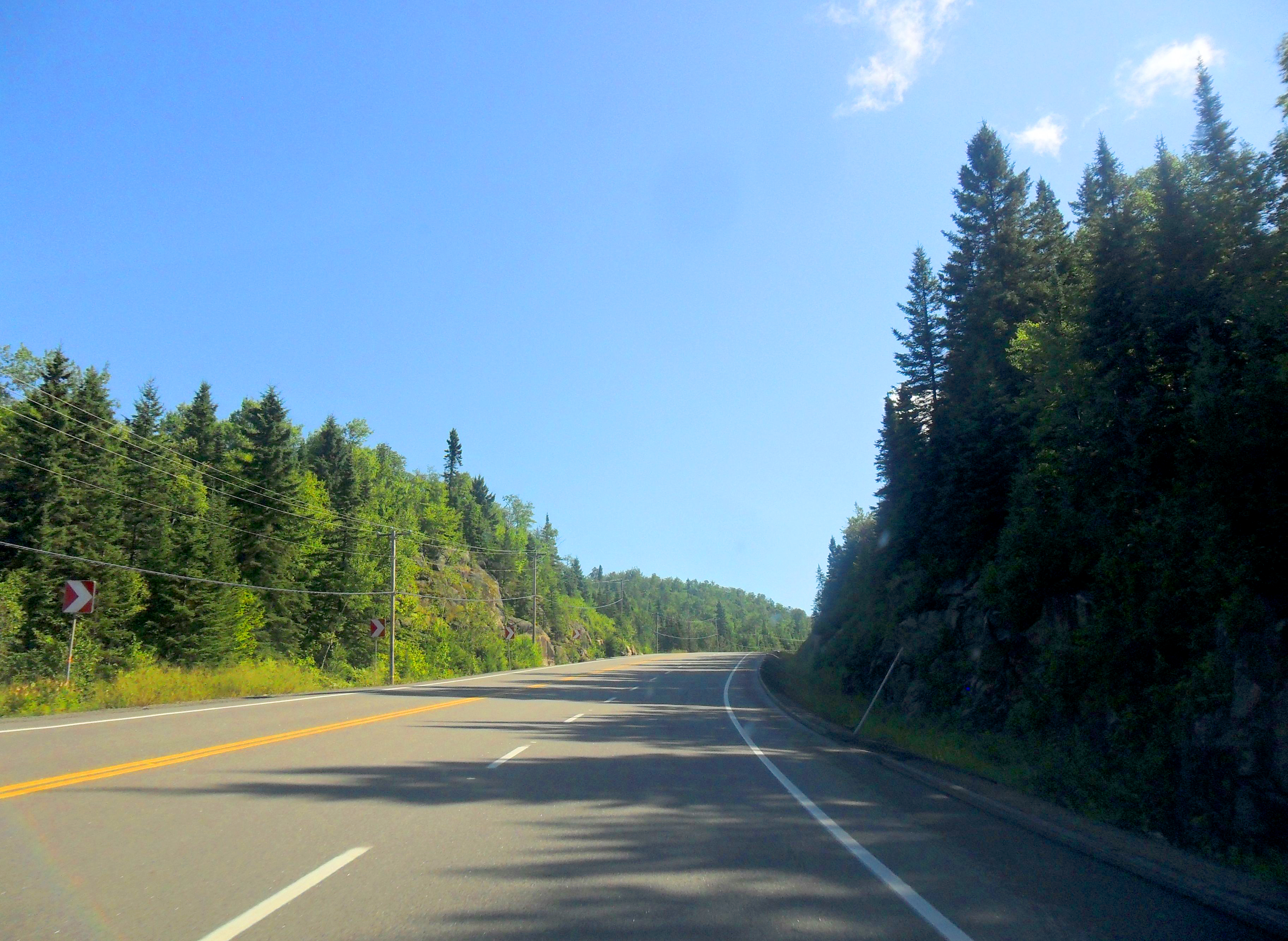
Quebec Route 172

- Saint-Nazaire
- Saint-Ambroise
- Saguenay
- Saint-Fulgence
- Sainte-Rose-du-Nord
- Sacré-Coeur
- Tadoussac

== See also ==
- List of Quebec provincial highways
