= Monts-Valin National Park =

National park in Quebec, Canada

Parc National des Monts-Valin
- IUCN category II (national park)
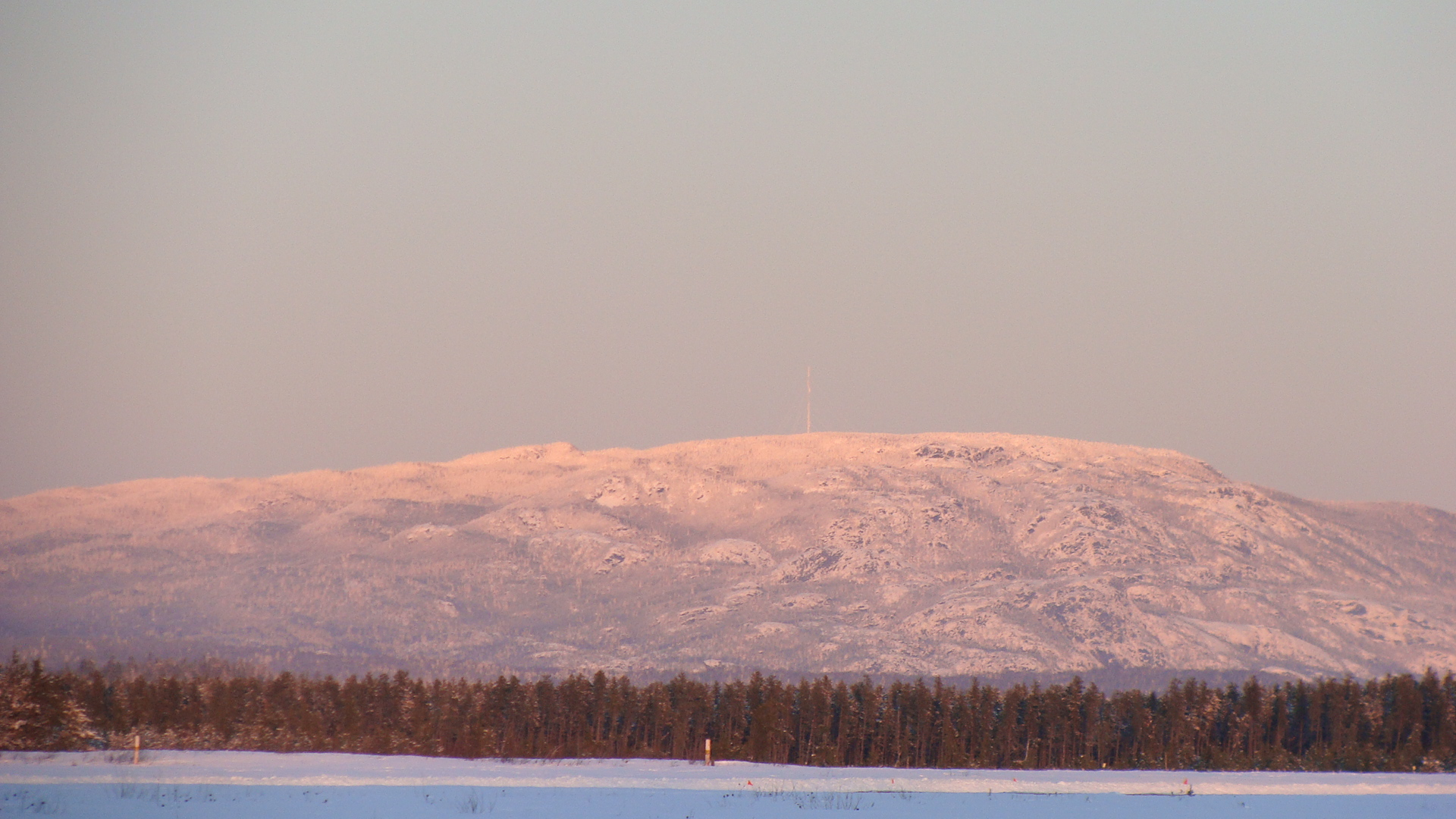
- Interactive map of Parc National des Monts-Valin
- Location: Mont-Valin, Le Fjord-du-Saguenay Regional County Municipality, Quebec, Canada
- Nearest city: Saguenay
- Coordinates: 48.6167°N 70.8°W
- Governing body: Sépaq

Parc National des Monts-Valin (French: Parc national des Monts-Valin, pronounced [paʁk nɑsjɔnal de mɔ̃ valɛ̃]) is one of twenty-nine national parks of Quebec, managed by the Quebec Outdoor Establishments Company (Sépaq). Located in Saguenay, the highest point of the region is found in Monts-Valin at Dubuc peak, as well as several other peaks reaching over 900 metres (3,000 ft) above sea level. It was established in 1996 to conserve a representative example of Mount Valin. For many years, the park has been a destination of choice for all outdoor enthusiasts, both summer and winter.

== Biodiversity ==
So far, botanists have identified 442 species of plants in Monts-Valin.

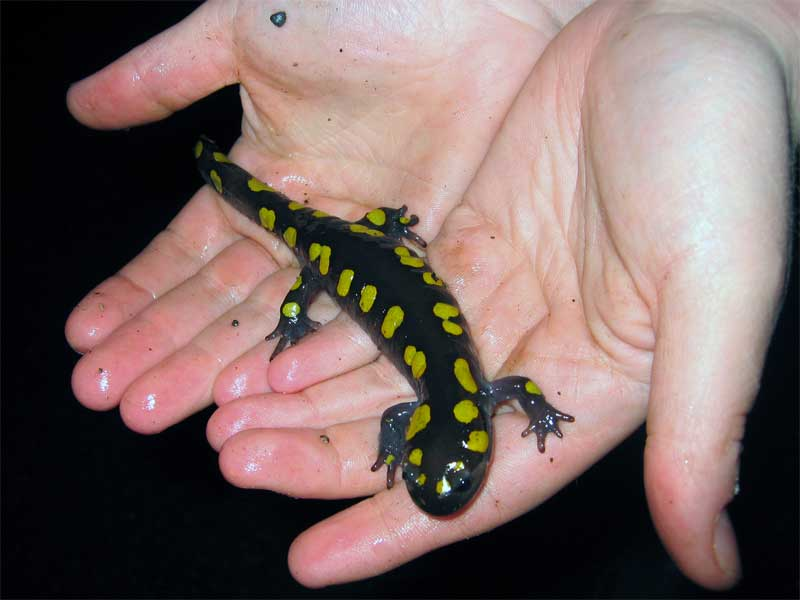
Spotted salamander

Likewise, thirty-seven species of mammals have been observed inside the park. The most frequently sighted mammals are the moose, the North American beaver, the fisher, the white-tailed deer, and the woodland caribou. Hairs of the eastern cougar were also collected in 2002, possibly confirming the previous presence of this predator around the park territory.

The only classes of reptiles that have been identified in the park's territory are the common garter snake and the northern redbelly snake. The latter is rare in this region, as it has only been identified within park territory as of 2006.

Amphibians, on the other hand, are numerous in the territory, with eleven distinct species divided into six families. The various wetlands distributed over the park are home to, among others, the American toad, the spring peeper, the wood frog, the green frog, the eastern newt, the spotted salamander, and the red-backed salamander.
