= Saint-David-de-Falardeau =

- Municipality
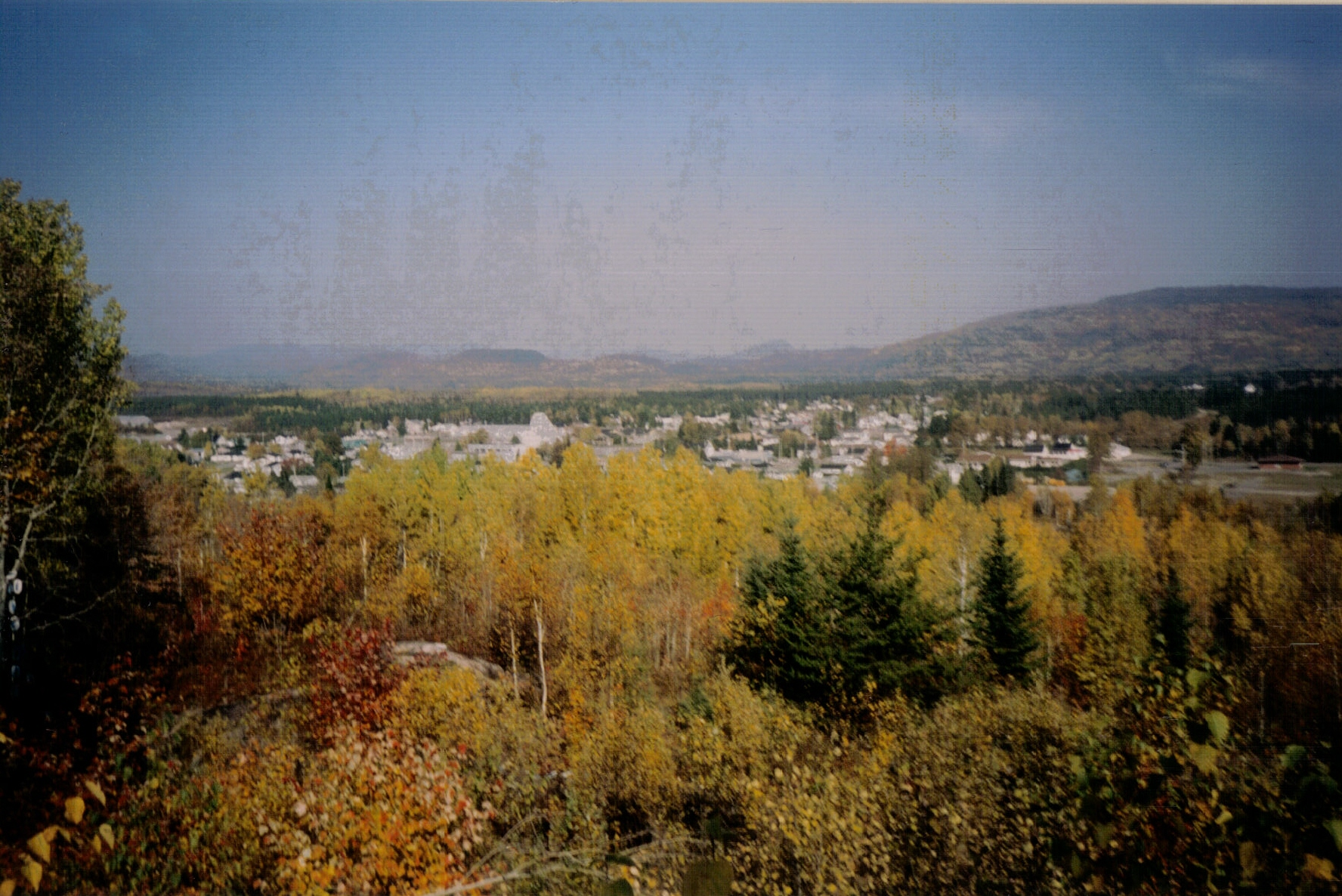

- Location in Saguenay–Lac-Saint-Jean Quebec.
- Coordinates: 48°37′N 71°07′W
- Country: Canada
- Province: Quebec
- Region: Saguenay–Lac-Saint-Jean
- RCM: Le Fjord-du-Saguenay
- Settled: 1891
- Constituted: January 1, 1948

Government
  - Mayor: Jean-Yves Dufour
  - Federal riding: Chicoutimi—Le Fjord
  - Prov. riding: Dubuc

Area
  - Total: 418.30 km^{2} (161.51 sq mi)
  - Land: 399.73 km^{2} (154.34 sq mi)

Population (2011)
  - Total: 2,657
  - Density: 6.6/km^{2} (17/sq mi)
  - Pop (2006–11): ▲4.0%
  - Dwellings: 1,953
- Time zone: UTC−5 (EST)
  - Summer (DST): UTC−4 (EDT)
- Postal code(s): G0V 1C0
- Area codes: 418 and 581
- Website: www.villefalardeau.ca

Saint-David-de-Falardeau is a municipality in Quebec, Canada.
