= Sainte-Marguerite River (Saguenay) =

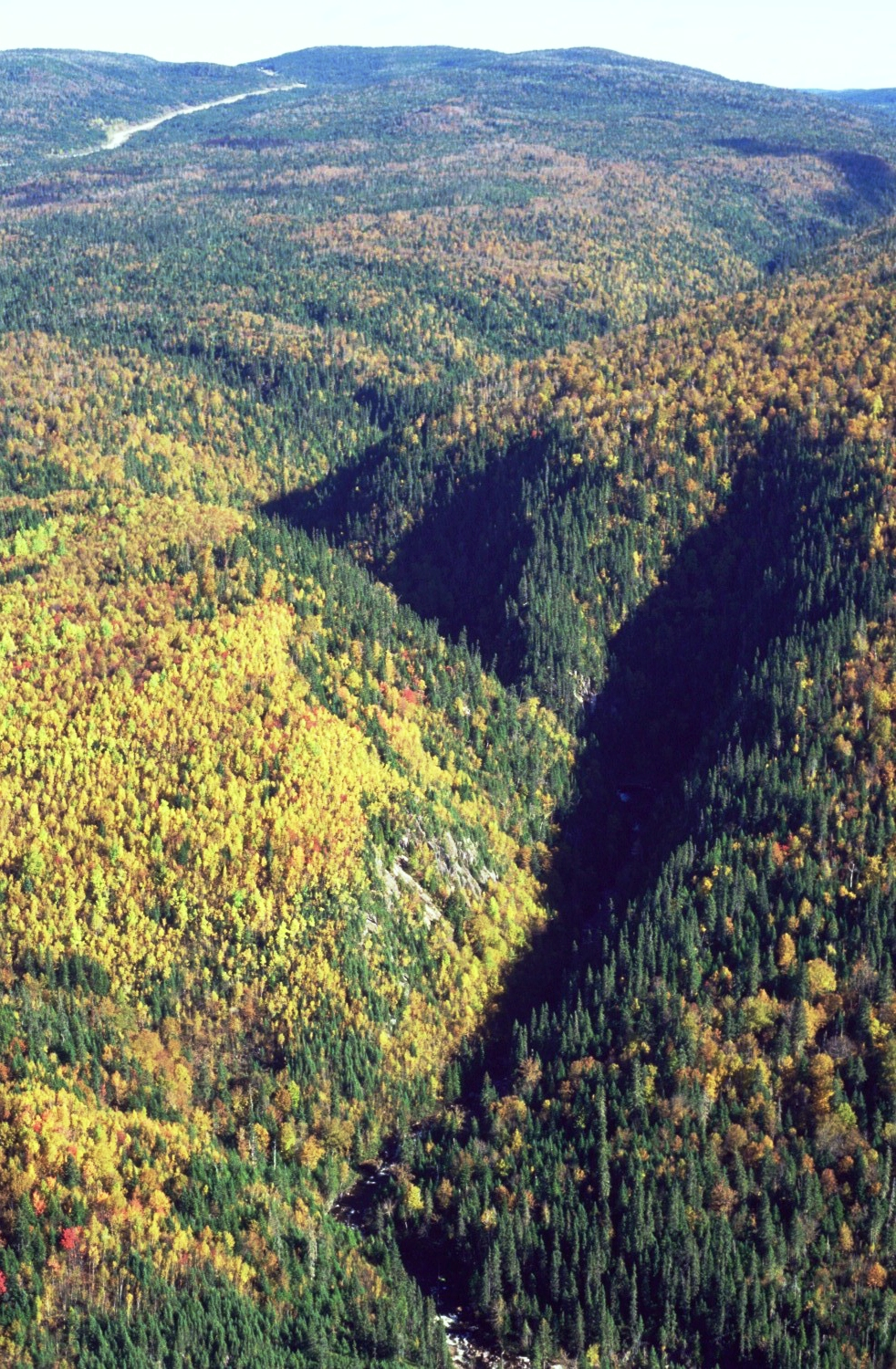
- Valley of Sainte-Marguerite River

- Location of the mouth in province of Quebec

Location
- Country: Canada
- Province: Quebec
- Region: Mont-Valin, unorganized territory

Physical characteristics
- Source
  - location: Sainte-Marguerite Lake
  - elevation: 678 m (2,224 ft)
- Mouth
  - location: Saguenay River
  - coordinates: 48.2631°N 69.9456°W
- Length: 100 km (62 mi)
- Discharge
  - average: Saguenay River

Basin features
- Tributaries
  - left: Bras des Murailles River (ex-river "Sainte-Marguerite North-West"), Sainte-Marguerite North-East River

The Sainte-Marguerite River is a river flowing in the unorganized territory of Mont-Valin, Le Fjord-du-Saguenay Regional County Municipality, in Quebec, in Canada. This river is a tributary of the Saguenay River.

== Toponymy ==
The name appeared on the map of the domain of the king's father Laure in 1731. It is also applied to the bay and cape located near its mouth

== Geography ==
=== Courses ===
Sainte-Marguerite River begins its course of 100 kilometres (62 mi) in Sainte-Marguerite Lake at an altitude of 678 metres (2,224 ft). This lake is recuperating water of many water bodies at West of Mont-Valin (785 metres (2,575 ft)), in the zec Martin-Valin.

Then, the river flows in north-westerly direction for a few kilometers before turning southwest on 15 kilometres (9.3 mi) and turns sharply to the southeast. It then goes along the Saguenay River on about 60 kilometres (37 mi). In final step of it course, the river turn toward South-West for a final 2.4 kilometres (1.5 mi) before flowing into the Sainte-Marguerite Bay at sea level. The entry of this bay (with a length of 2.7 kilometres (1.7 mi) and 1.3 kilometres (0.81 mi) of maximum width) is located at 25 kilometres (16 mi) (by the river) upstream of the Tadoussac ferry.

The main tributaries are "la Petite rivière Sainte-Marguerite nord-est", "la rivière Valin" and "le Bras des Murailles" (including it tributary "le ruisseau Couture"). The main creeks which are tributaries of "Sainte-Marguerite River" are: Barre, Épiphanie, Épinette and "de la Cage".

The course of Sainte-Marguerite River cross many rapids, such as (from the upper part of the river):

- "Le Rapide Vert", located at 2.7 kilometres (1.7 mi) at the north-west of "Montagne Brulée (404 metres (1,325 ft));
- "Le Grand rapide", located at north-west of the "Montagne de Bardsville" (337 metres (1,106 ft)); in front, on north side of the river, the "Mont Arthur-Leblanc" is topping the sector at 465 metres (1,526 ft);
- "Rapide de la Montagne", located at about 4 kilometres (2.5 mi) at north-east of the "Montagne du Bras Morin" (493 metres (1,617 ft)).

== See also ==
- Zec Martin-Valin
- Zec de la Rivière-Sainte-Marguerite
- Sacré-Coeur, municipality
- Saguenay River
- Le Fjord-du-Saguenay Regional County Municipality
- Vallée-de-la-Rivière-Sainte-Marguerite Biodiversity Reserve
