= Saint-Fulgence =

- Municipality
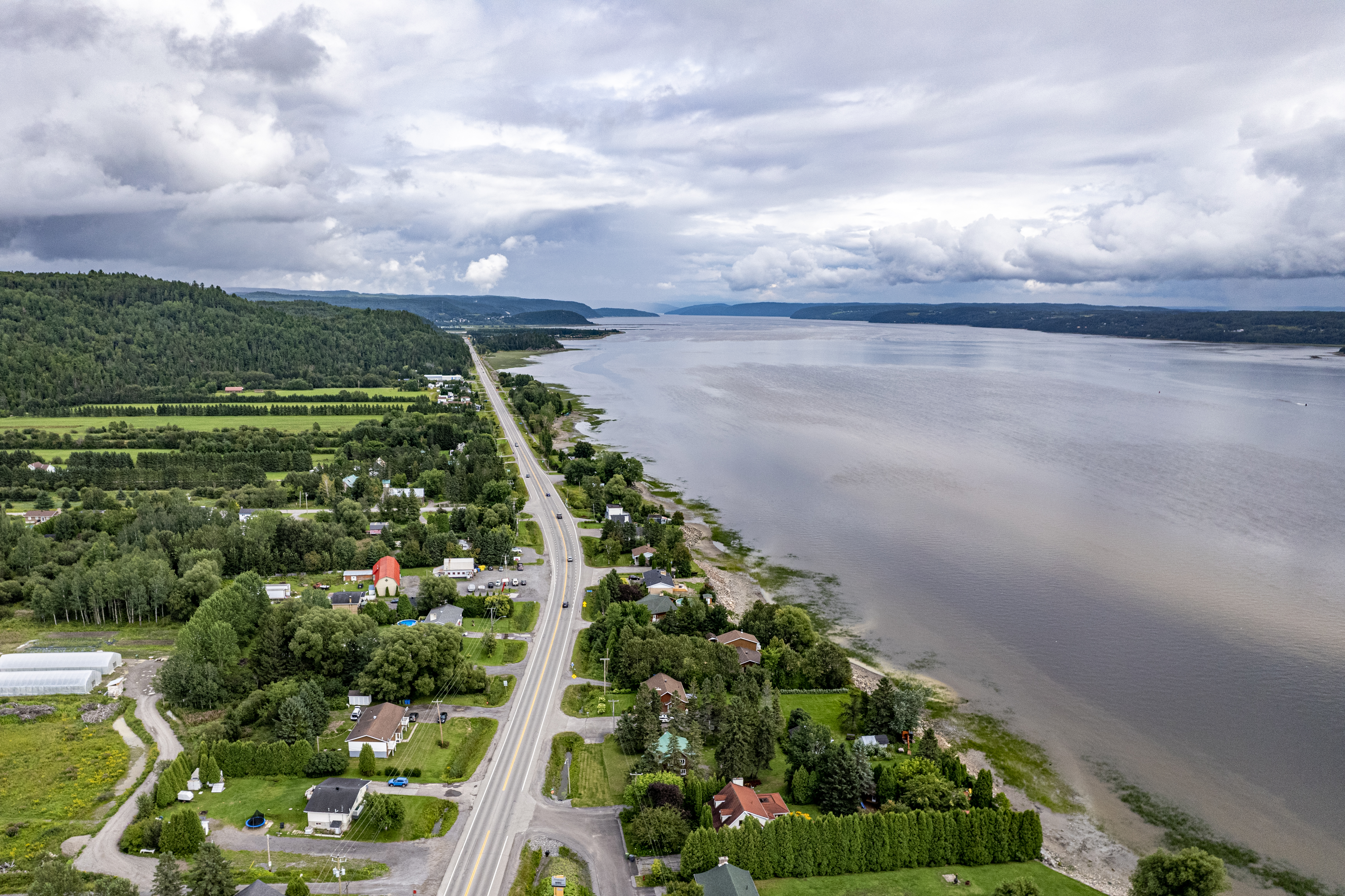
- Aerial view of Saint-Fulgence

- Coat of arms

- Location in Saguenay–Lac-Saint-Jean Quebec.
- Coordinates: 48°27′N 70°54′W
- Country: Canada
- Province: Quebec
- Region: Saguenay–Lac-Saint-Jean
- RCM: Le Fjord-du-Saguenay
- Settled: 1839
- Constituted: May 1, 1973

Government
  - Mayor: Gilbert Simard
  - Federal riding: Chicoutimi—Le Fjord
  - Prov. riding: Dubuc

Area
  - Total: 390.70 km^{2} (150.85 sq mi)
  - Land: 352.78 km^{2} (136.21 sq mi)

Population (2016)
  - Total: 2,071
  - Density: 5.9/km^{2} (15/sq mi)
  - Pop (2011–16): ▲6.3%
  - Dwellings: 1,008
- Time zone: UTC−5 (EST)
  - Summer (DST): UTC−4 (EDT)
- Postal code(s): G0V 1S0
- Area codes: 418 and 581
- Website: www.ville.st-fulgence.qc.ca

Saint-Fulgence (French pronunciation: [sɛ̃ fylʒɑ̃s]) is a municipality in Quebec, Canada.

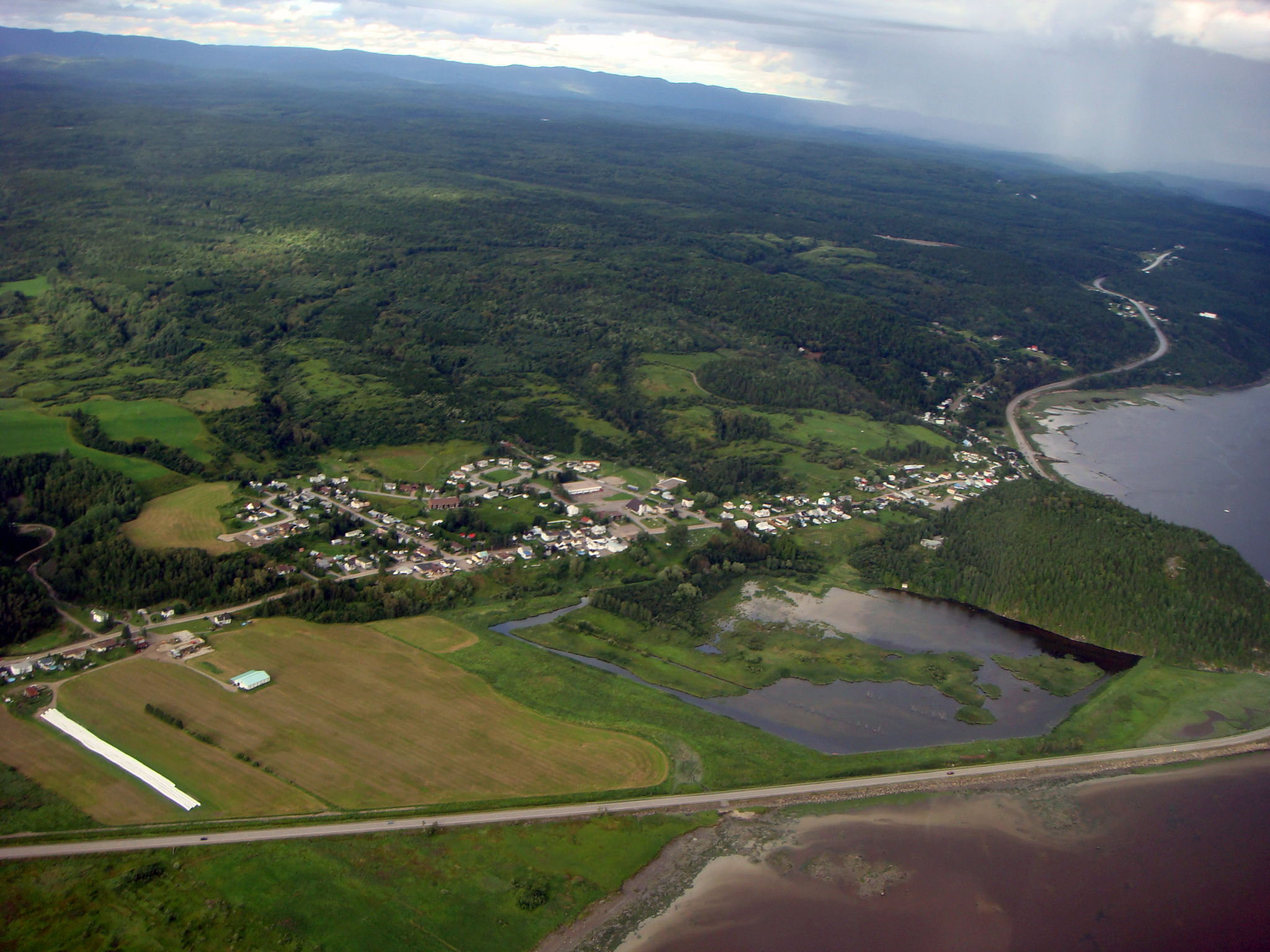
Aerial view of Saint-Fulgence
