= Mont-Valin, Quebec =

Mont-Valin
- Unorganized territory
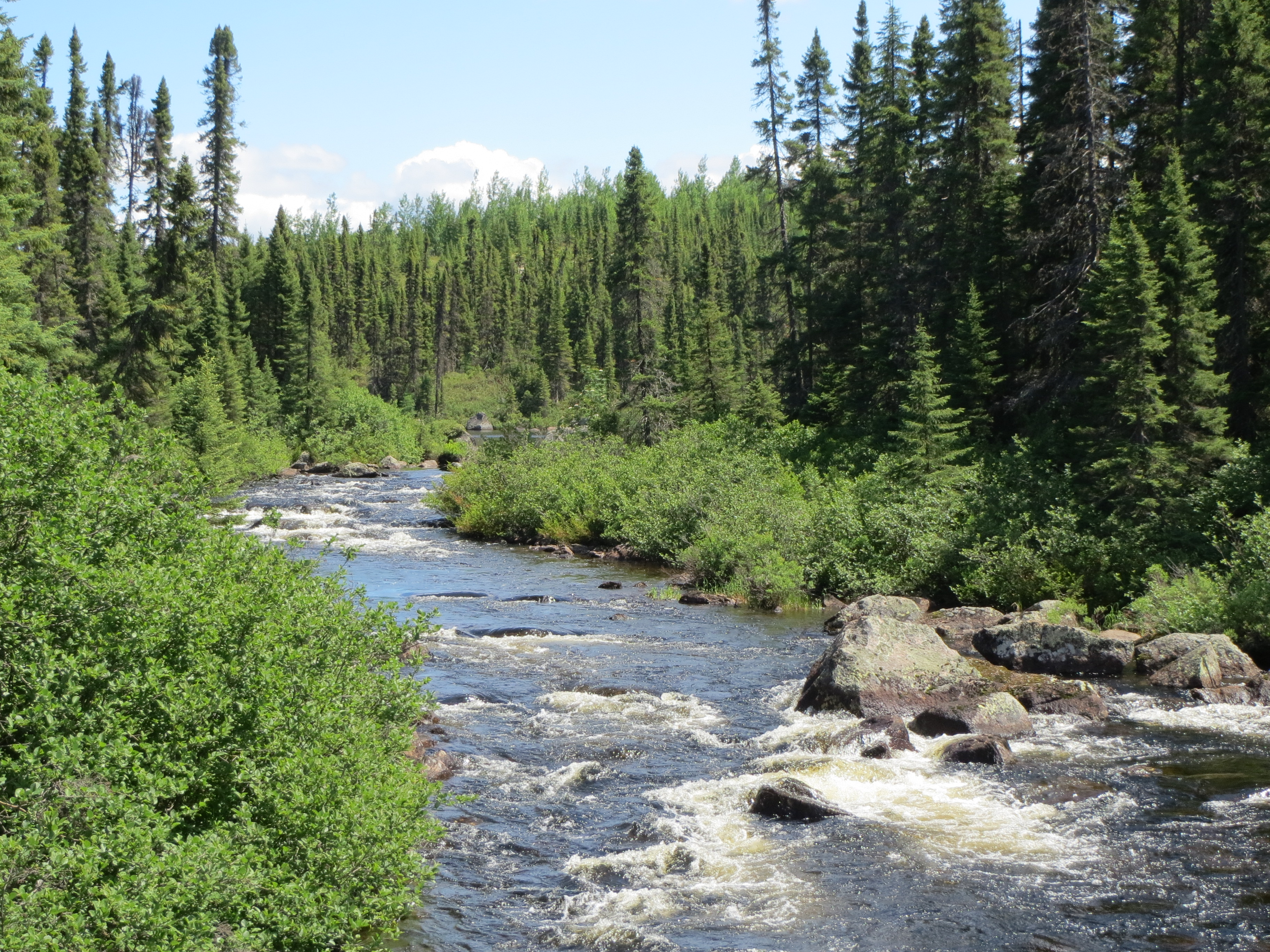

- Location in Saguenay–Lac-Saint-Jean Quebec
- Coordinates: 48°37′N 70°48′W
- Country: Canada
- Province: Quebec
- Region: Saguenay–Lac-Saint-Jean
- RCM: Le Fjord-du-Saguenay
- Constituted: February 18, 2002

Government
  - Federal riding: Jonquière—Hébertville—Pays-des-Bleuets
  - Prov. riding: Dubuc

Area
  - Total: 38,032.30 km^{2} (14,684.35 sq mi)
  - Land: 33,540.39 km^{2} (12,950.02 sq mi)

Population (2021)
  - Total: 10
  - Density: 0/km^{2} (0/sq mi)
  - Pop (2016–21): ▲ N/A
  - Dwellings: 44
- Time zone: UTC-5 (EST)
  - Summer (DST): UTC-4 (EDT)

Mont-Valin is an unorganized territory in the Canadian province of Quebec. It makes up over 87% of Le Fjord-du-Saguenay Regional County Municipality and is the largest subdivision of the Saguenay–Lac-Saint-Jean region. The territory, named after Mount Valin, had a population of 10 as of the Canada 2021 Census, and covered a land area of 33,540.39 km^{2}.

The territory has one settlement: the hamlet of Chutes-des-Passes, located 160 kilometres (99 mi) north of Chicoutimi (49°50′23″N 71°09′55″W). It was founded in 1941, when Alcan built a dam on the Peribonka River. When operation of the dam was automated in 1974, the community was almost entirely abandoned.

The Mont-Valin unorganized territory is a strip of land that stretches from Saguenay River bank to the north. It is bordered to the west by the Rivière Péribonka and to the east by the limit of Côte-Nord administrative region.

== Demographics ==
Population trend:

- Population in 2021: 10 (2016 to 2021 population change: N/A)
- Population in 2016: 0
- Population in 2011: 5
- Population in 2006: 15
- Population in 2001: 20
- Population in 1996: 2
- Population in 1991: 5

Private dwellings occupied by usual residents: 5 (total dwellings: 44)

== See also ==
- Saint-Martin Dam
- Vallée-de-la-Rivière-Sainte-Marguerite Biodiversity Reserve
