= Zec de la Rivière-Dartmouth =

- Location within Quebec
- Location: Canada, Quebec, La Côte-de-Gaspé Regional County Municipality
- Nearest city: Rivière-Saint-Jean (La Côte-de-Gaspé), an unorganized territory
- Coordinates: 49°02′N 64°53′W
- Area: length of 63.10 kilometres (39.21 mi)
- Established: 1983

The Zec de la Rivière-Dartmouth is a "zone d'exploitation contrôlée" (controlled harvesting zone] (zec) in the unorganized territory of the Saint-Jean River, in La Côte-de-Gaspé Regional County Municipality, in the administrative region of Gaspésie-Îles-de-la-Madeleine, in Quebec, in Canada.

== Geography ==
The Dartmouth River rises in the north-east of the peninsula of Gaspésie. The river flows mainly in forested and uninhabited region; however, approaching its mouth, the river passes through a rural residential area in the city of Gaspé. The Dartmouth River has beautiful mountain scenery. This wild river offers the tranquility and charm of memorable fishing activities.

== Recreational fishing ==
Recreational wading fishing on the river is most common. To properly controlled aquatic fauna, the Dartmouth River is divided into seven fishing zones:

- 3 non-quota areas: 1, 3 and 5 No reservations, unlimited number of poles;
- 4 zones quota (2 sticks): 2, 4, 6, and 7 These areas are subject to a preseason draw on November 1. The draw at 48 hours in advance for locations is still available.

Salmon sometimes behave different ways from a pit to another one, depending on the time of the season, the water level, current, or the characteristics of a pit; which involves various fishing strategies (e.g.: choice of fly and position around the pit) for wading.

== Toponymy ==
The name "Zec de la Rivière-Dartmouth" was formalized on Sept. 5, 1985 at the Bank of place names in the Commission de toponymie du Québec (Geographical Names Board of Quebec).

== See also ==
- Rivière-Saint-Jean (La Côte-de-Gaspé), unorganized territory
- Gaspésie
- Dartmouth River
- Saint-Jean River (Gaspé)
- Gaspé
- Zec de la Rivière-York (controlled harvesting zone) (zec)
- Zone d'exploitation contrôlée (controlled harvesting zone) (zec)
