= Zec de la Rivière-Sainte-Marguerite =

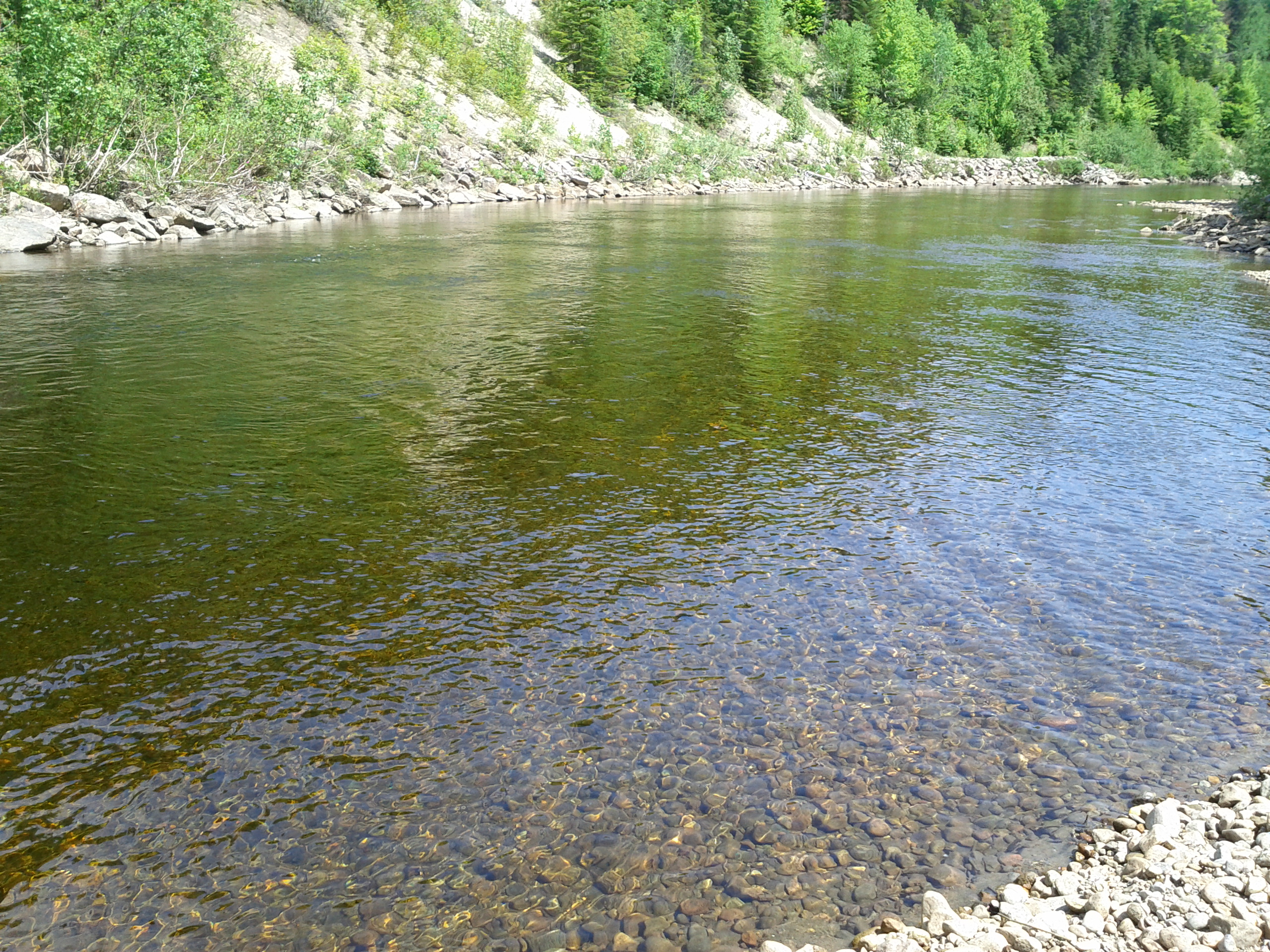
- Salmon pool 54 in the river.

- Location within Quebec
- Location: Canada, Quebec, Le Fjord-du-Saguenay Regional County Municipality
- Nearest city: Saguenay
- Coordinates: 48°26′00″N 70°25′00″W
- Area: Length of 184.4 kilometres (114.6 mi)
- Established: 1980

The ZEC de la Rivière-Sainte-Marguerite is a "zone d'exploitation contrôlée" (controlled harvesting zone) (ZEC) in the unorganized territory of the Mont-Valin, in Le Fjord-du-Saguenay Regional County Municipality, in the administrative region of Saguenay-Lac-Saint-Jean, Quebec, Canada.

== Geography ==
With a length of 184.4 km, the ZEC is the second longest salmon river in ZEC of Quebec or after Zec de la Rivière-Bonaventure.

Zec covering three rivers

The "ZEC de la Rivière-Sainte-Marguerite" is a ZEC of salmon river fitted on the course of three rivers:

- The Sainte-Marguerite northeast River flowing in the north-south direction between the territories of the Zec Nordique (on east) and the Zec Chauvin (on west). This river flows into the Sainte-Marguerite River to 2.4 km from the mouth of the latter.
- "Le bras des Murailles" (Arm of the Walls) (tributary of the Sainte-Marguerite River).
- The Sainte-Marguerite River, which is the main river. The Sainte-Marguerite River serves as southern limit to the Zec Chauvin

The route 172 between Tadoussac to Saguenay city goes on 55 km along the Sainte-Marguerite River, up to the "Montagne du Chapeau" (Mountain Hat) (250 m), covering the area 1 to 4 of Zec. From this mountain, it is possible to canoe upstream the river.

Sainte-Marguerite River

With a length of 100 km, the Sainte-Marguerite River takes its source in Lake Saint-Marguerite (elevation 678 m) and various body of water at west of the Mont-Valin (785 m), in the Zec Martin-Valin. It flows prior to the northwest for a few kilometers before turning south-westerly direction for 15 km. Then the river branches south-east for a distance of 60 km almost parallel to the Saguenay River. In the end of course, the river branches south-west for a final 2.4 km to its mouth where it empties into the Sainte-Marguerite Bay on the north shore of the Saguenay River. The entrance to the bay (2.7 km long and 1.3 km at its widest point) is 25 km (by the river) downstream of the cross Tadoussac.

The main river tributary is the Sainte-Marguerite northeast river, Valin River and "Bras des Murailles" (Arm of the Walls) (and its tributary stream Couture). The main tributaries of the Sainte-Marguerite River are: Barre, Epiphanie, Spruce and "de la Cage".

The route of the Sainte-Marguerite River pass through several rapids, including (from the top level of the river):

- "Le Rapide Vert" (The Fast Green), located 2.7 km northwest of the "Burned Mountain (404 m);
- "Le Grand Rapide" (The Great Rapid), located northwest of Mountain Bardsville (337 m); opposite, on the north side of the river, Mount Arthur-Leblanc led the industry to 465 m;
- "Rapide de la Montagne" (Rapide of the Mountain), located about 4 km northeast of Mount Arm Morin (493 m).

'Administrative Office of Zec'

The administrative office of the Zec, located at 160 Main Street, Sacred Heart, delivers users Zec canes access rights, fishing permits for salmon, rental boots, flies, lodging, camping, regulations, etc. Attendants also provide additional information and provide advice on particular sectors, the best fishing pools, choice of flies and the trout and salmon run. Municipality Sacred Heart is located 22.5 km by car from Tadoussac by route 172. The Sainte-Marguerite River is ten kilometers from Sacred Heart towards Saguenay city.

'Accommodation'

Four types of accommodation practiced in ZEC: wild camping on the edge of the river, the prospector tent, the rustic camp or cottage. The cottages are: Bardsville (pit 38), Bras d'Alain (pit 23) and Walls (pit 16). The camps are: Onézime (rustic) (septic 65-69), Saint-Germain (rustic) (septic 70-74) and Dampool (rustic) (septic 75-79). Prospector tents are available at Bras d'Alain.

== Fishing ==
Sainte-Marguerite River is divided into several sectors subject to quotas (limiting the number of fishermen) and other non-quota (unlimited number of fishermen). Generally, the ZEC has tickets available without advance booking. Each fishing area and pits are defined; they are also well identified. Wading is convenient for the majority of pits given the shallowness of the water; however, some require the use of a boat (without motor).

Between June 1 and September 15, each angler must hold one of the three types of licenses are salmon: catch and release, a day or year. For this period, the permit holding for the "other species" is not required. Only fly fishing is permitted in salmon rivers. The rotation of the fishermen is required for each pit. Each angler must comply with the daily bag limit and return to the water all large salmon. Each angler must record the catch of small salmon and report returned to the water.

== Toponymy ==
The name of the ZEC is directly related to the place name of the river of the same name. The name "Zec Rivière-Sainte-Marguerite" was formalized August 5, 1982 at the Bank of place names in the Commission de toponymie du Québec (Geographical Names Board of Quebec).

== See also ==
- Mont-Valin, unorganized territory
- Le Fjord-du-Saguenay Regional County Municipality (RCM)
- Saguenay River
- Saguenay-Lac-Saint-Jean, administrative region of Quebec
- Zec Chauvin
- Zone d'exploitation contrôlée (Controlled harvesting zone) (ZEC)
- Sainte-Marguerite Bay
