= Zec Baillargeon =

- Location within Quebec
- Location: La Côte-de-Gaspé Regional County Municipality
- Nearest city: Gaspé, Quebec
- Coordinates: 48°47′40″N 64°50′20″W
- Area: La Côte-de-Gaspé Regional County Municipality
- Established: 1981
- Governing body: Association chasse et pêche de Gaspé inc
- Website: zecbaillargeon.reseauzec.com

The Zec Baillargeon (referred to 2007: Zec York-Baillargeon) is a "zone d'exploitation contrôlée" (controlled harvesting zone) located in the unorganized territory of Rivière-Saint-Jean, in La Côte-de-Gaspé Regional County Municipality, in the administrative region of Gaspésie-Îles-de-la-Madeleine, in Quebec, in Canada.

The economy of this country is based on forestry and recreational and tourism activities. This area is managed by "Association chasse et pêche de Gaspé inc" which is a non-profit corporation. This organism was created initially on July 23, 1971, and registered as of February 15, 1995 at "Registraire des entreprises du Québec" (Registry of enterprises of Quebec).

== Geography ==
The ZEC Gaspe covering 67.9 square kilometres (26.2 sq mi) is bordered to the north by the York River and south by the Rivière-Saint-Jean. To the north, the coast of the York River is operated by Zec de la Rivière-York (Zec of York-River). To the south, the coast of the "Rivière Saint-Jean" (St. John River) is operated by Wildlife Refuge of St. John river. The territory of the zec covers part of Canton Township Laforce and Baillargeon.

The territory of the zec has the shape of a square, the side of the north has a curved line marrying a segment of the path of the York River.

ZEC is served by the route 198 (from the north), the forest road R1113 (from the south), the route of Twin Lake Road-Ross and the path of Tour. The ZEC is located 20 minutes drive at west of Gaspé.

Annually, the surface of water bodies is generally frozen from November to April.

== Toponymy ==
The "Zec Baillargeon" derives its name from the canton of the same name. The name of this township was proclaimed in 1866. This name evokes the memory of Charles-François Baillargeon (1798-1870), fifteenth bishop and third archbishop of Quebec from 1867 to 1870. He served his diocese in 1850 as coadjutor to Bishop Pierre-Flavien Turgeon. In addition to its charitable and educational works, he left a French translation of the New Testament. The Commission de toponymie du Québec (Geographical Names Board of Québec) formalized the name "Zec Baillargeon" on January 16, 2007, replacing the designation "Zec York-Baillargeon" which was known since 1981.

The lake Baillargeon is the largest water body of the zec Baillargeon; it discharges into the York River by stream Baillargeon.

The name "Zec Baillargeon" was formalized on Jan. 16, 2007 at the Bank of place names in the Commission de toponymie du Québec (Geographical Names Board of Québec).

== See also ==
=== Related articles ===
- Rivière-Saint-Jean, unorganized territory
- La Côte-de-Gaspé Regional County Municipality,
- Gaspésie-Îles-de-la-Madeleine, administrative region
- Zone d'exploitation contrôlée (Controlled harvesting zone) (ZEC)

=== External links ===
- Official website of ZEC Baillargeon.
- Official website of "Department of Natural Resources and Wildlife" of Quebec government, accessed July 4, 2014.
- Official website of "Ecological Reserve of Grande-Rivière" (Gaspésie).
