= Escoumins =

Escoumins may refer to:

== Toponyms ==
=== Canada ===
==== Quebec ====
- Les Escoumins, a municipality of Côte-Nord (North-Shore)
- Petits-Escoumins, a hamlet of the municipality Longue-Rive
- Township Les Escoumins (designated Escoumins in the past), a township located in Les Escoumins
- Escoumins River, a river in the municipality of Les Escoumins
- Petits-Escoumins River, a river flowing in the municipality of Les Escoumins
- Zec de la Rivière-des-Escoumins, a zone d'exploitation contrôlée (controlled harvesting zone) located in Les Escoumins
- Escoumins Bay, a bay located in municipality of Les Escoumins
- Large sandbar Escoumins (Grande batture des Escoumins), a sandbar of St. Lawrence River located in municipality of Les Escoumins
- Rare forest of Escoumins (Forêt rare des Escoumins), an exceptional forest ecosystem located in the municipality of Les Escoumins
- Escoumins Power Station, a station of power distribution, located in municipality of Les Escoumins
- Lake Small-Escoumins, located in the unorganized territory of the Lac-au-Brochet, in administrative region of Côte-Nord (North-Shore)
- Escoumins Dam, a dam built in La Tuque, in Mauricie
- Des Escoumins street located in Gatineau, in administrative region of Outaouais
- Des Escoumins street, located in Terrebonne, in administrative region of Lanaudière
- Des Escoumins street, located in Quebec City, in administrative region of [apitale-Nationale

===== Old names =====
- Les Escoumins, Quebec (Indian reserve), old name of actual Indian Reserve of Essipit, Quebec on Côte-Nord (North-Shore)
- Lake des Escoumins, old name of Bastien Lake, located in La Tuque
