= Zec Onatchiway =

- Location within Quebec
- Location: Canada, Quebec, Le Fjord-du-Saguenay Regional County Municipality
- Nearest city: Saguenay city
- Coordinates: 49°05′05″N 70°49′00″W
- Area: 1,462 square kilometres (564 sq mi)
- Established: 1978

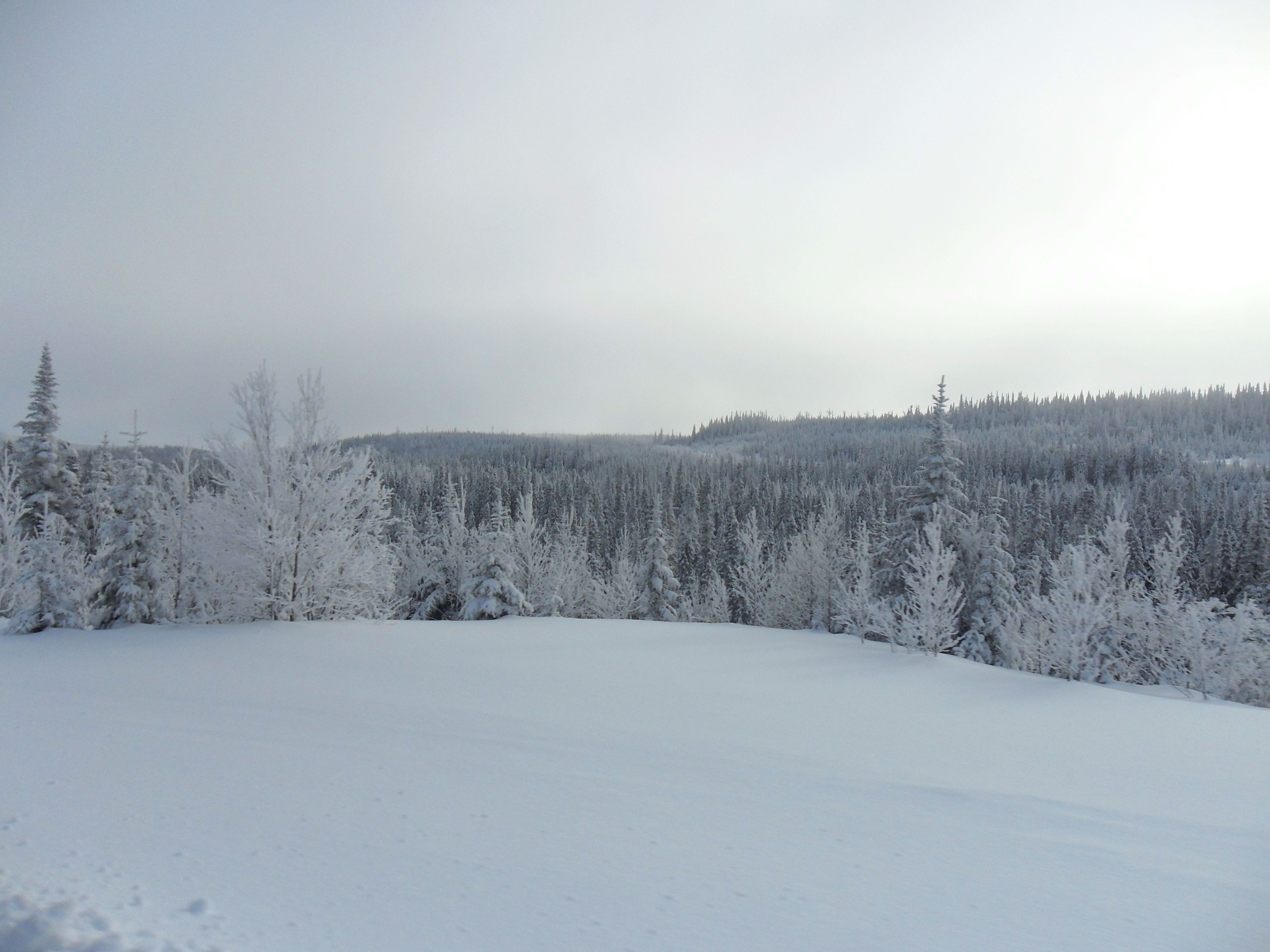
Landscape in the ZEC Onatchiway in winter

The ZEC Onatchiway is a "zone d'exploitation contrôlée" (controlled harvesting zone) (zec) of 1,462 square kilometres (564 sq mi), located in the unorganized territory of Mont-Valin, in the Le Fjord-du-Saguenay Regional County Municipality, in the administrative region Saguenay-Lac-Saint-Jean, in Quebec, in Canada.

== Geography ==
The western boundary of the ZEC is usually between 16 and 20 kilometres (12 mi) of Peribonka River. ZEC is bordered on:

- West by the Lake Onatchiway and Little Lake Onatchiway;
- North by lakes Rouvray and Clear;
- Southeast by the Zec Martin-Valin. Zec Onatchiway is located at 11 kilometres (6.8 mi) north of the boundary of the Monts-Valin National Park.

ZEC has many rivers, including:

- Rivers (or river segment): Onatchiway, du Portage, "de la Tête Blanche" (White Head), Francois Paradis, aux Castors (Beaver) and Venus;
- Streams: Solitaire, Shipshaw, du Poste, Rouge, "à David", Travers and "en l'Air".

The largest lakes are: Lake Onatchiway (west), Little Lake Onatchiway (west), Rouvray (north), Lake au Poivre (center), Bergeron (east) and Beausejour (center). Among the accessible recreative fishing lakes, there are lakes: Clair, Lessard, Pétamban, des Nymphes, Saint-Martin, McNaughton, Coghill, 1st Lake Price, 2nd Price Lake, du Castor (Beaver), Craig, Petit Lac Croche, Bob, Grand Lake Croche, Little Lake Culotte and Ponds Fortin.

The most important entry roads are: Shipshaw road and Bras Louis road. Paths to access to the entrance stations of the ZEC:

- Entrance station Onatchiway (main entrance station of Zec) (contact: 418-690-4061): accessible from the road along the Shipshaw River (Price Road);
- Entrance station of Bras-Louis (information: 418-690-4062): accessible from Lévesque road going to the ski resort The Valinoët.

Note: Users of Zec will pay at entrance station, their access right and daily or seasonal fishing rights and/or hunting, the various hunting licenses and fishing. They can also be purchased maps of the area etc., service light refreshments. And learn about the territory

== Hunting and Fishing ==
On the territory of the ZEC, several lakes are equipped with a ramp for launching. ZEC provides the user with a rental service launches on different bodies of water. While canoes are available at the entrance stations.

== Toponymy ==
The name "Onatchiway" comes from a term derived from the Montagnais "unatshishineu" which refers to the deception, deceit, in the scheme. According to oral tradition, the Montagnais or Innu have escaped an Iroquois prosecution fooling their enemies by making use of unusual tricks.

For many centuries this territory to the east of Lake Onatchiway was part of the usual hunting areas and trapping of Montagnais bands. This is sometimes called Zec Onatchiway East; adding the cardinal simply means that the area is located east of Lake Onatchiway

The name "ZEC Onatchiway" was recorded on August 5, 1982, at the Bank of place names in the Commission de toponymie du Québec (Geographical Names Board of Quebec).

== See also ==
=== Related articles ===
- Saguenay River
- Shipshaw River
- Le Fjord-du-Saguenay Regional County Municipality
- Saguenay-Lac-Saint-Jean, administrative region of Quebec
- Parc national du Fjord-du-Saguenay
- Zone d'exploitation contrôlée (Controlled harvesting zone) (ZEC)

== Attachments ==
=== External links ===
- Official website
