= Zec de la Petite-Rivière-Cascapédia =

- Location within Quebec
- Location: Canada, Quebec, Bonaventure Regional County Municipality
- Nearest city: Grande-Cascapédia, Cascapedia-Saint-Jules
- Coordinates: 48°22′N 65°45′W
- Area: 127.5 square kilometres (49.2 sq mi)
- Established: 1992
- Governing body: Association des pêcheurs sportifs des rivières Cascapédia inc.

Zec Petite-Rivière-Cascapédia is a "zone d'exploitation contrôlée" (controlled harvesting zone) (ZEC) in the unorganized territory of Rivière-Bonaventure, in Bonaventure Regional County Municipality, in the administrative region Gaspésie-Îles-de-la-Madeleine, in Quebec, in Canada. The main purpose of the ZEC is managing salmon fishing.

== Geography ==
Zec Petite-Rivière-Cascapédia covers the journey of the "Petite-rivière Cascapedia" in Gaspésie.

== Salmon fishing ==
The Petite rivière Cascapedia is descending on 120 kilometres (75 mi). It includes four fishing sectors in the area of the ZEC. Four species are fished: salmon, trout, brook trout (sea trout) and sculpin. Recreative fishing is practiced by wading or by boat, according to the convenience and periods of flooding. Nature adepts can participate in recreative fishing with or without guide. Initially, the daily salmon fishing rights per fishing sectors are awarded randomly per pole and vault pit. Then the remaining rights are assigned with or without reservation.

ZEC offers accommodation in chalets at Mélançon camp, located on Lake Mélançon near the Petite Rivière-Cascapedia. Visitors of the ZEC may also use the services of the campground. In addition, visitors can venture into hiking and mountain biking in the region; they discover unique landscapes in this mountainous area.

== Toponymy ==
According to the Commission de toponymie du Québec (Geographical Names Board of Quebec), the term "Cascapedia" appears in 26 names on the territory of Quebec. The largest number of these names are found in the Gaspé Peninsula.

The name "Zec Petite-Rivière-Cascapédia" was formalized on March 5, 1993, at the Bank of place names in the Commission de toponymie du Québec (Geographical Names Board of Quebec).

== See also ==
- Chaleur Bay (Baie des Chaleurs)
- Gaspésie
- Gaspésie National Park
- Rivière-Bonaventure, unorganized territory
- Bonaventure River, coastal river flowing into the Chaleur Bay (Baie-des-Chaleurs)
- Cascapedia-Saint-Jules, municipality of Gaspésie
- Grande-Cascapédia, a town of Gaspésie
- Zone d'exploitation contrôlée (Controlled harvesting zone) (ZEC)
