= Zec Mitchinamecus =

ZEC in Laurentides, Quebec, Canada

- Location within Quebec
- Location: Antoine-Labelle Regional County Municipality
- Nearest city: Lac-De La Bidière, unorganized territory
- Coordinates: 47°13′17″N 75°12′45″W
- Area: 84,340 square kilometres (32,560 sq mi)
- Established: 1978
- Governing body: Association Chasse & Pêche de Ste-Anne-du-Lac

The ZEC Mitchinamecus is a "zone d'exploitation contrôlée" (controlled harvesting zone) (ZEC) in the unorganized territory of Lac-De La Bidière, in the Antoine-Labelle Regional County Municipality, in the administrative region of Laurentides, in Quebec, in Canada.

== Geography ==
Zec Mitchinamecus administers public lands at north of Mont-Laurier, in Laurentides.

Zec Mitchinamecus is related to:

- The Zec Lesueur on the west side where a series of lakes (in the north-south axis) serves as a boundary between the Zec Lesueur and Zec Mitchinamecus: Petit lac Boisvert, Boisvert, Tonus, Duplessis, de la Chaise, Kataway, de la Montagne;
- The Zec Normandie on the east side (defined in part by the "Rivière Rouge" (Red River) (northern part of the ZEC) and more or less the Mitchinamecus river (for a segment of the southeastern part of the ZEC). Note: Parent (southbound) trail follows the route of the Redwood River;
- A series of lakes marks the southern limit of the ZEC: "de la File", Croche, Foster, "des Polonais".

On the south side of the ZEC, a serie of lakes is serving as the delimitation of ZEC: lac Foster, Baie Topani, Croche et Courtois. While the "Grand lac des chiens" (Grand Lake of dogs) marks the eastern boundary of the ZEC. The Mitchinamecus river is the central water body of the Zec.

=== Major lakes ===
Other major lakes of Zec are: Antoine, Atocas, de la Bidière, Buck Fever, Calvé, du Cerise, Chat, Chopin (Lac Long), Clifford, Dieppe, Dempsey, Duplessis, Éva, Gilles, Grand lac Rognon, de la Hasse, Jacques, Joli-Coeur, du Lièvre, Réservoir Mitchinamecus, de la Montagne, Montredon, Oscar, Petit lac des chiens, Picard, du Pin Rouge, Robberts, Scott, Sobieski, Sylvain, Troisième lac Busby, Tuffield, Premier lac Twin, Deuxième lac Twin, Vaillancourt, Vastel, Villeneuve, Xavier and Yvonne.

=== Main rivers ===
The Mitchinamecus river is the main river of the ZEC, passing through the territory from the northeast to the southeast. Mitchinamecus dam creates a huge reservoir of fresh water. Other rivers include: d'Argent et Pin Rouge (coté Est). Tandis que les principaux ruisseaux sont: Nottaway, Cerise, Skarga, Mickiewicz, Torniche and Sand.

=== Major mountains ===
Mountains Curie (288 metres (945 ft)) and Paderewski, are located on either side of Lake Chopin, at southwest of Zec. A "montagne de la tour" (mountain of the tower) is located near a bay Mitchinamecus Reservoir.

=== Camping and reception stations ===
Both home Zec positions are:

- Silver Lake, accessible by kilometer 11 of the 11th row, via Sainte-Anne-du-Lac
- Chute MacLean, accessible by the kilometer 52 of the Parent road via Mont-Saint-Michel.

ZEC offers over 400 campsites spread across its six campgrounds: Maskoutain, Chat, Dempsey and Baie Villeneuve, Pin Rouge and Lac d'Argent. The first four lots are located on the banks of the Mitchinamecus Reservoir.

== Toponymy ==
The name of the ZEC is derived from the Mitchinamecus Reservoir and Mitchinamecus River which are located in the ZEC. This name appears in 1911 in official Geographic documentation. This name came from Cree language and means "big trout", from word "misinamecus", meaning "large size", and "namecus" meaning "trout".

The name "Zec Mitchinamecus" was formalized August 5, 1982 at the Bank of place names in the Geographical Names Board of Canada.

== See also ==
- Lac-De La Bidière, unorganized territory
- Antoine-Labelle Regional County Municipality
- Laurentides, administrative region of Quebec
- Zec de la Maison-de-Pierre
- Zec Lesueur
- Zec Normandie
- Zone d'exploitation contrôlée (Controlled harvesting zone) (ZEC)
