= Zec de Saint-Romain =

- Location within Quebec
- Location: Canada; Québec, Le Granit Regional County Municipality
- Nearest city: Saint-Romain
- Coordinates: 45°42′57″N 71°05′52″W
- Area: 19.70 square kilometres (7.61 sq mi)
- Created: 2002

The Zec Saint-Romain is a "zone d'exploitation contrôlée" (controlled harvesting zone) (ZEC) in the municipality of Saint-Romain, in the Le Granit Regional County Municipality (MRC), in the administrative region of Townships, in Quebec, in Canada.

ZEC was established in 2002 following a regional consensus for the establishment of a structured wildlife reserve to protect populations of deers in the area. Among 63 territorial ZEC, it is the latest to be constituted in ZEC in Quebec and the second smallest ZEC in term area (excluding ZEC of rivers).

== Geography ==
The ZEC is located in Estrie (Townships), at the borders of the administrative area of the Beauce, Quebec. Covering 2,000 hectares of forest, the territory of the ZEC is located on public lands in the Municipality of Saint-Roman on the south of the village, west of the town of Stornoway, north of Nantes and west of Saint-Samuel-Station. The ZEC is located southeast of the Frontenac National Park. Specifically, the route 108 is the northern boundary on the circuit road Summits. Felton River is the western boundary; Nantes and the southern boundary of the municipality Sainte-Cécile-de-Whitton, the eastern boundary.

The host Saint-Romain station is located on the route 108.

== Hunting and Fishing ==
Felton River has the only water body of the ZEC. The anglers can tease the brook trout, the brown trout and landlocked. ZEC offers fishing packages or seasonal daily. A fishing course designed by ZEC includes: ■ 8 pits furnished by the work of home improvement (thresholds and flow deflectors); ■ 3 parking, including composting toilets; ■ 5 rest areas along the river with picnic tables.

On the territory of the ZEC, the hunting is authorized depending periods of the year, the type of hunting gear and sex of animals (moose): moose, deer, american black bear, hare and grouse.

== Key attractions ==
The outdoor followers can hike or hiking in hybrid, by observing the landscape, fauna and flora. In summer, many user of the ZEC are picking wild berries: strawberries, raspberries, blueberries...

Due to its location in the area of the starry sky reserve (at north of Mont Mégantic), the area is free of light filters, many followers make the night sky observation. Several lakes to recreational tourism are close to the ZEC including: St. Francis, Mégantic, Aylmer, Elgin and Drolet. In addition, the Frontenac National Park offers various attractions and services in a wilderness.

ZEC offers hosting services to four rustic shelters: The Roman, Norman, Réjean and Felton. These cottages are furnished, equipped and fitted with a wood stove. In addition, the ZEC offers a dozen campsite for wild camping.

== Toponymy ==
The name "Zec Saint-Romain" derives from the name of the municipality. This name was made official on June 11, 2002 at the Bank of place names in the Commission de toponymie du Québec (Geographical Names Board of Quebec).

== See also ==
=== Related articles ===
- Saint-Romain, a municipality
- Le Granit Regional County Municipality (RCM)
- Estrie (Townships), administrative region of Quebec
- Zone d'exploitation contrôlée (controlled harvesting zone) (ZEC)
