= Zec du Lac-de-la-Boiteuse =

Controlled harvesting zone in Quebec, Canada

- Location within Quebec
- Location: Canada, Quebec, Le Fjord-du-Saguenay Regional County Municipality
- Nearest city: Saguenay, Alma
- Coordinates: 48°54′N 71°16′W
- Area: 381 square kilometres (147 sq mi)
- Established: 1978
- Governing body: Association sportive Ste-Marie pour la Zec de la Boiteuse

The Zec du Lac-de-la-Boiteuse is a "zone d'exploitation contrôlée" (controlled harvesting zone) (ZEC) located in the unorganized territory of the Mont-Valin, in the Le Fjord-du-Saguenay Regional County Municipality, in the administrative region of Saguenay-Lac-Saint-Jean, in Quebec, in Canada.

== Geography ==
The territory of the ZEC is bounded on:

- West by Vermont lakes and La Mothe,
- South by the lake Bilodeau,
- South-west by the Lake Tchitogème,
- West, the Peribonka flows south (outside ZEC) in parallel to the edge of the ZEC, keeping a distance of 4.6 km and 8.7 km.

Covering an area of 389 square kilometers, the territory of the "Zec du Lac-de-la-Boiteuse" is located north of the Saguenay River. It includes 180 lakes of which 95 are used for sport fishing. ZEC has five rivers which three are used for fishing. The two closest cities of the Zec du Lac-de-la-Boiteuse are Alma (20 km) and Saguenay. The nearest town of the ZEC is Notre-Dame-du-Rosaire.

Major lakes in the Zec are: Auguste, des Bacon, lac de la Boiteuse (Cripple Lake), Cléophe, "en Cœur" (In Heart), Culotte (Panties), Entre-Deux, "Grand lac aux Outardes", des îles, Jobbers, Maltais, "Petit lac aux Visions", des Poux, Rond, Smith, Tarrant and "du Trou".

The post home ZEC is located in the extreme south of the country, just north of "Lac à l'Ours" (Bear Lake).

== Hunting and Fishing ==
In Zec, the outdoor enthusiasts can indulge in various activities: hunting, fishing, hiking, biking or snowmobile, camping, and watching landscapes, flora and fauna. The "Lac de la Boiteuse" (Cripple Lake) and Lake of Bacon are equipped with a ramp to the water.

Anglers have to comply with the regulations in force on recreative fishing. The brook trout is limited.

The bobcat and lynx, two species considered vulnerable, are present on the territory of the ZEC. Bird watchers can also observe various species of raptors including owls, eagles, the hawks of barred owls and herons.

The wildlife is plentiful in the territory of the ZEC, the hunting is on such different times of the year, hunting gear, areas of the territory for the following species: moose, american black bear, grouse and hare.

== Toponymy ==
The name "Zec du Lac-de-la-Lame" is linked to Lac-de-la-Boiteuse, which is the largest lake in the territory of the ZEC. The ZEC is located south of the "Baie de la Boiteuse" (Bay of the Cripple), which is a bay at southwest of Lake Onatchiway.

The place name "Zec du Lac-de-la-Boiteuse" was formalized on August 5, 1982 at the Bank of place names in the Commission de toponymie du Québec (Geographical Names Board of Quebec).

== See also ==
- Mont-Valin, unorganized territory
- Le Fjord-du-Saguenay Regional County Municipality, (RCM)
- Saguenay River
- Saguenay-Lac-Saint-Jean, administrative region
- Notre-Dame-du-Rosaire
- Zone d'exploitation contrôlée (Controlled harvesting zone) (ZEC)
