= Zec de la Rivière-York =

Controlled harvesting zone in Quebec, Canada

- Location within Quebec
- Location: Canada, Quebec, La Côte-de-Gaspé Regional County Municipality, Rivière-Saint-Jean (La Côte-de-Gaspé)
- Nearest city: Gaspé
- Coordinates: 48°55′00″N 65°11′00″W
- Area: length of 94.1 kilometres (58.5 mi)
- Established: 1980
- Governing body: Société de gestion des rivières de Gaspé

The Zec York River is a controlled fishing zone ("zone d'exploitation controlée", or Zec) in the unorganized territory of Rivière-Saint-Jean in La Côte-de-Gaspé Regional County Municipality (REM), in the Gaspésie-Îles-de-la-Madeleine administrative region of Quebec, Canada.

== Geography ==
"Zec de la Rivière-York" is located in the heart of the Gaspésie Peninsula, an uninhabited wilderness area, and has several salmon pools. Zec de la Rivière-York is 94.1 kilometres (58.5 mi) long and is accessible by Highway 198 which crosses La Côte-de-Gaspé REM, east to west through Murdochville.

Like most major rivers of the Gaspésie Peninsula, the York River rises in the mountains around Murdochville in the Chic-Choc Mountains at the centre of the Gaspésie Peninsula. The panorama of mountains attract visitors. The York River is typical of salmon rivers of Gaspésie, with water tinted green because of the suspended minerals, the constant level of the river, and a rapid current.

From Murdochville, the river flows at first south-east before turning north to make a big loop in the Collines-du-Basque. It then flows more or less in parallel (on north side) to the Rivière-Saint-Jean. Further on, the river passes on the edge of Zec York-Baillargeon, around Lake Baillargeon. It empties into Gaspé Bay. In short, Zec de la Rivière-York takes the form of a long narrow strip which covers almost the entire length of the York River between Murdochville and the city of Gaspé.

== Salmon fishing ==
Zec de la Rivière-York attracts "saumeniers" from throughout America because of the scenery and the size of salmon caught in its cold, clear waters. The York River is segmented into eleven fishing quota areas. Typically, salmon pools are easily accessible along its entire length from Highway 198. The river is host to six fish species: Atlantic salmon, brook trout, American eel, stickleback, banded killifish, and smelt (arc-en-ciel).

== History ==
The York River is famous for harbouring large salmon.

1870: The chronicles of the time report that fishermen like the Governor General of Canada, Lord Dufferin and his wife regularly take, season after season, salmon of 11 to 14 kilograms (31 lb). At that time, the exclusive fishing rights belong to the purveyor Thomas Reynolds from Ottawa.

1970: The water rights of the York River pass into the hands of the York River Fishing Club. In 1977, a section of about 16 km is open to the public under the Government of Quebec.

1980: Government of Quebec opens the fishing public for the entire route of the York River. Zec de la rivièreYork is then established.

1981 Agreements are concluded with various landowners for zec extends over almost the entire territory.

== Toponymy ==
The toponym Zec de la Rivière-York was made official on 5 September 1985 by the Commission de toponymie du Québec (Geographical Names Board of Quebec).
