= Zec Jaro =

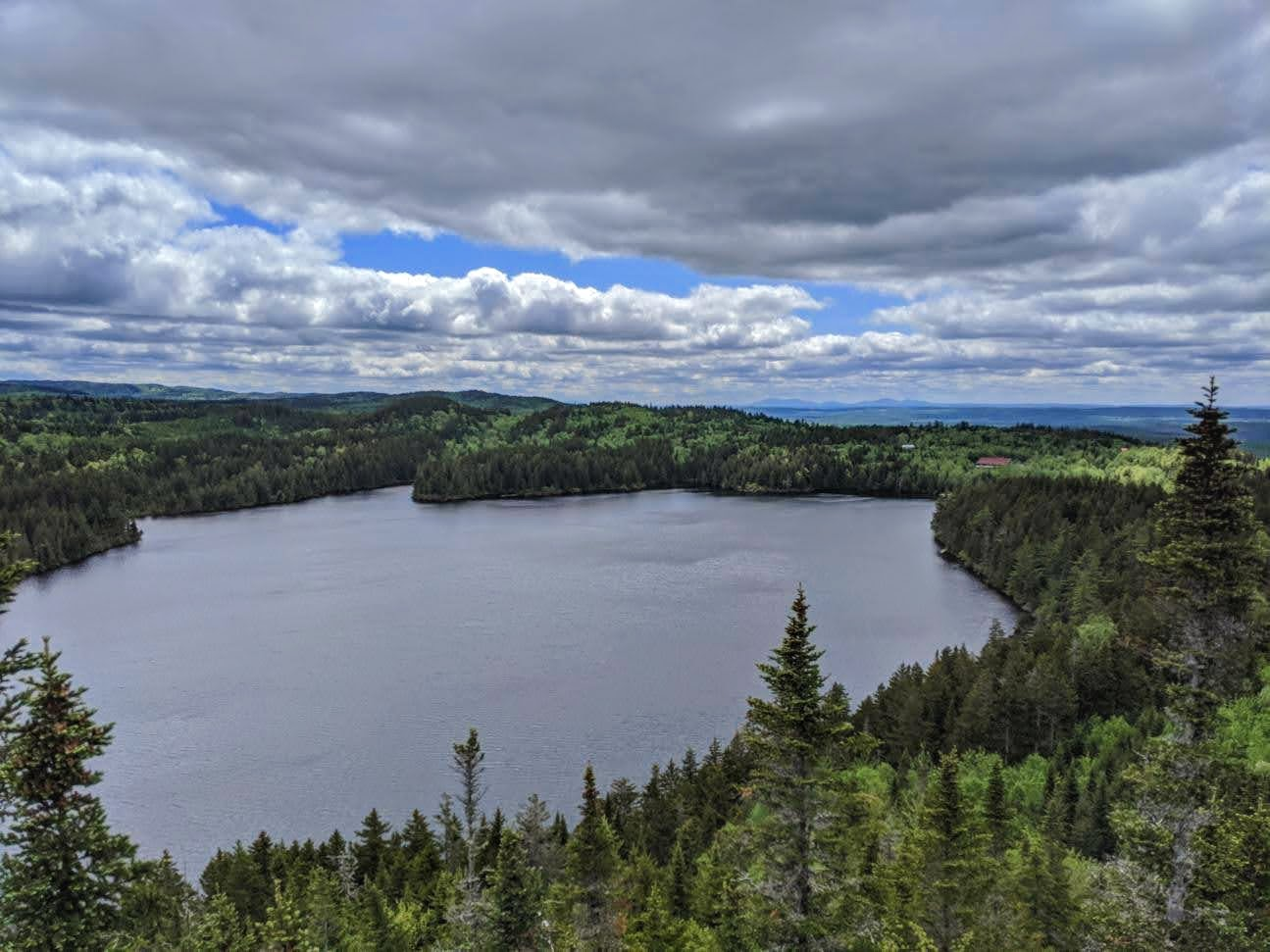
- Cygnes lake in Spring.

- Location within Quebec
- Location: Canada, Quebec, Beauce-Sartigan Regional County Municipality
- Nearest city: Saint-Théophile
- Coordinates: 45°54′52″N 70°21′41″W
- Area: 155 square kilometres (60 sq mi)
- Established: 1978
- Governing body: La Société Beauceronne de Gestion Faunique incorporée

The Zec Jaro is a "zone d'exploitation contrôlée" (controlled harvesting zone) (ZEC) in the municipality of Saint-Théophile, in the Beauce-Sartigan Regional County Municipality (RCM), in the administrative region of Chaudière-Appalaches, in Quebec, Canada.

The territory of the ZEC is administered by the "Société Beauceronne de Gestion Faunique incorporée" (Beauceronne Society of Wildlife Management incorporated), which is a non-profit organization. This organism was established on 26 September 1978.

Every spring, several maple groves are in operation on the territory of the ZEC. These homeowners or renters of lots are producers grouped in the "Association des producteurs acéricoles du secteur Zec Jaro" (Maple Syrup Producers Association of the Zec Jaro sector). This association was incorporated in 2009 into the "Registraire des entreprises du Québec" (Registrar of enterprises of Quebec).

== Geography ==
The territory of the ZEC covers an area of 155 square kilometers. It is bounded on the south by the border of Quebec and United States. The drainage system of the ZEC has 20 water bodies and 25 km of streams. The main lake in the territory of the ZEC are: Petit Castor, the Lady Duck, Bartley, Bartley small lake and Fish Lake. The road runs alongside President Kennedy (north-south) the western boundary of the ZEC and through the community of Armstrong.

Path to reach the Armstrong entrance station, located on the west side of the ZEC:

- Coming from Quebec, take Highway 73 south to join route 173 south to Armstrong (junction 269 and 173), still on route 173 south, 1 km south of the said junction.
- Coming from the Townships, take route 269 to route 173; then route 173 south for one km.

== Campsites, cabins and inn ==
The ZEC operates the "Auberge du Cerf" with a capacity of 36 places, offering accommodation for exclusive hire for group holiday services. ZEC also offers two cottages: the "Condo shelter" and "Camp Jeuneusse Nature", accessible from the Armstrong post entrance. In addition, the ZEC offers thirty rustic or equipped campsite for camping in the area, including at "Lac des Cygnes" (Swan Lake), "lac de la Dame" (Lake of the Lady) and "lac Petit Castor" (Little Beaver lake).

== Key attractions ==
Walking trails

Trail perimeter of Swan Lake

Housed on the edge of Swan Lake, this 3.5 km walking trail is a chance to admire the regional flora. This trail offers two additional options to the route, or walk two kilometers (round trip) almost double the Portage River Falls, or the mounting fire, reached by a staircase of 100 steps a hundred leading to a turret, for see the panorama of the Swan Lake. On a clear day, visitors can see up to twelve church steeples of surrounding areas of Zec Jaro.

Path of the Canada-US border

This trail offers a view of the border area Quebec-Maine which bounds the south of Zec Jaro. Lying about 8891 km, the Canada-U.S. border proves the longest on the planet. The border line is managed by a dedicated team appointed by the two governments to maintain visibility and accessibility are constant. Its layout from the Atlantic ocean to Pacific is marked by a series of numbered terminals entrenched in the soil. These terminals are obvious marks on the line between the two countries. Segment boundary between the province of Quebec and U.S. is 813 km long. The portion defining Zec Jaro south is about 24 km.

ATV Trails

A special course in all-terrain vehicle (ATV) over 50 km, will help visitors to discover many natural attractions, wildlife and forest land of Zec Jaro. Optionally, the course offers the opportunity to make a loop near the Canada-U.S. border.

== Toponymy ==
The name of the ZEC comes from an old club of hunting and fishing that makes maintaining party. The term "Jaro" comes from the popular black crest Hocks designating the inhabitants of the Beauce (Quebec). Based on the Commission de toponymie du Québec (Geographical Names Board of Quebec), the term "Jaro" is used for the ZEC, lake, streets and a stream.

The name "Zec Jaro" was formalized on August 5, 1982 at the Bank of place names in the Commission de toponymie du Québec (Geographical Names Board of Quebec).

== Hunting and Fishing ==
Hunting contingency on the territory of the ZEC is related to these species: black bear, white-tailed deer, the moose, the wild turkey, the grouse, the pheasant and the hare. Special hunting permits are issued by lottery organized by the zec for the moose and white-tailed deer.

During the winter, ice fishing is practiced at "lac des Cygnes" (Swan Lake) in fishing huts located in various areas of the lake. Lakes for fishing quotas are Little Beaver Lake, Duck Lake and Swan Lake. The brook trout is the subject of sport fishing quota.

== See also ==
=== Related articles ===
- Saint-Théophile, municipality
- Beauce-Sartigan Regional County Municipality (RCM)
- Chaudière-Appalaches, administrative region of Quebec
- Zone d'exploitation contrôlée (Controlled Harvesting Zone) (MRC)
