= Zone d'exploitation contrôlée =

Type of protected area in Quebec, Canada

A zone d'exploitation contrôlée (French pronunciation: [zon dɛksplwatasjɔ̃ kɔ̃tʁole]; acronym ZEC) is a "controlled harvesting zone" located in public lands areas of Quebec, Canada. ZECs are a system of territorial infrastructures set up in 1978 by the Government of Quebec to take over from private hunting, fishing and trapping clubs (as a result of "Operation wildlife management") to provide timely access to recreational activities to the general public like hunting and fishing.

== Administration ==
ZECs are non-profit organisations managed by honorary administrators whose primary responsibility is to manage fishing and hunting activities, and see to wildlife conservation on their respective territories.

ZEC objectives:

1. Wildlife conservation (hunters and anglers must report their catch)
2. Access to wildlife resources
3. User participation
4. Operations must be financially self-sufficient

ZECs fill a much larger economic place than fishing and hunting clubs did as they also promote all types of recreational and tourism activities such as hiking, canoeing, canoe-camping, mountain-biking, rock-climbing, vacationing and cottage rental, camping, wildlife/nature observation, wild berry picking, etc. They are open to all recreational enthusiasts and reservations are generally not required.

== Organisation ==
The 86 ZECs consist of 63 hunting and fishing areas, 22 salmon fishing areas, and one wildfowl hunting area. They are gathered in 11 regional groups whose role is to facilitate exchanges between managers from different ZECs and allow solving common problems.

Four years after the first ZEC inaugurations, the Government of Quebec helped the ZEC administrators to found the Fédération québécoise des gestionnaires de zecs (FQGZ) whose role is to provide a common voice to all the ZECs at the provincial level and promote wildlife conservation.

== List across the Province ==
Name	Region	Area (km^{2})	Salmon River length (km)	Founded
Anses	Gaspésie–Îles-de-la-Madeleine	164.50		1979
Anse-Saint-Jean	Saguenay–Lac-Saint-Jean	193.50		1978
Baillargeon	Gaspésie–Îles-de-la-Madeleine	67.90		1981
Bas-Saint-Laurent	Bas-Saint-Laurent	1,019.00		1978
Batiscan-Neilson	Capitale-Nationale	878.00		1978
Bessonne	Mauricie	524.50		1978
Borgia	Mauricie	556.00		1978
Boullé	Lanaudière	638.50		1978
Bras-Coupé–Désert	Outaouais	1,205.00		1978
Buteux–Bas-Saguenay	Capitale-Nationale	258.70		1978
Cap-Chat	Gaspésie–Îles-de-la-Madeleine	121.00		1992
Capitachouane	Abitibi-Témiscamingue	858.00		1978
Casault	Gaspésie–Îles-de-la-Madeleine	838.00		1978
Chapais	Bas-Saint-Laurent	388.00		1978
Chapeau-de-Paille	Mauricie	1,270.00		1978
Chauvin	Saguenay–Lac-Saint-Jean	619.00		1978
Collin	Lanaudière	427.00		1978
Croche	Mauricie	351.80		1978
D'Iberville	Côte-Nord	438.00		1978
Dumoine	Abitibi-Témiscamingue	1,500.00		1978
Festubert	Abitibi-Témiscamingue	1,255.00		1979
Forestville	Côte-Nord	1,328.00		1978
Frémont	Mauricie	601.00		1978
Grande-Rivière	Gaspésie–Îles-de-la-Madeleine		23	1980
Gros-Brochet	Mauricie	1,439.20		1978
Jaro	Chaudière-Appalaches	114.72		1978
Jeannotte	Mauricie	324.00		1978
Kipawa	Abitibi-Témiscamingue	2,397.00		1989
Kiskissink	Mauricie	829.50		1978
Labrieville	Côte-Nord	406.00		1978
Lac-au-Sable	Capitale-Nationale	370.00		1978
Lac-Brébeuf	Saguenay–Lac-Saint-Jean	434.00		1978
Lac-de-la-Boiteuse	Saguenay–Lac-Saint-Jean	381.00		1978
Lavigne	Lanaudière	406.31		1978
Lesueur	Laurentides	776.50		1978
Lièvre	Saguenay–Lac-Saint-Jean	964.00		1978
Louise-Gosford	Estrie	168.40		1978
Maganasipi	Abitibi-Témiscamingue	1,012.00		1978
Maison-de-Pierre	Laurentides	805.10		1978
Mars-Moulin	Saguenay–Lac-Saint-Jean	805.10		1979
Martin-Valin	Saguenay–Lac-Saint-Jean	1,200.00		1978
Martres	Capitale-Nationale	424.00		1978
Matimek	Côte-Nord	1,854.00		1979
Mazana	Côte-Nord	734.00		1978
Menokeosawin	Mauricie	298.50		1978
Mitchinamecus	Laurentides	843.40		1978
Nordique	Côte-Nord	458.30		1978
Normandie	Laurentides	1,018.00		1978
Nymphes	Lanaudière	275.10		1979
Oie-Blanche-de-Montmagny	Chaudière-Appalaches	8.40		1987
Onatchiway	Saguenay–Lac-Saint-Jean	1,462.00		1978
Owen	Bas-Saint-Laurent	615.00		1978
Pabok	Gaspésie–Îles-de-la-Madeleine		165	1997
Passes	Saguenay–Lac-Saint-Jean	1,491.00		1978
Petawaga	Laurentides	1,491.00		1978
Petite-Rivière-Cascapédia	Gaspésie–Îles-de-la-Madeleine		127.5	1992
Pontiac	Outaouais	1,205.00		1978
Rapides-des-Joachims	Outaouais	960.10		1979
Restigo	Abitibi-Témiscamingue	1,270.90		1978
Rivière-à-Mars	Saguenay–Lac-Saint-Jean		44.5	1995
Rivière-aux-Rats	Saguenay–Lac-Saint-Jean	1,781.00		1978
Rivière-Blanche	Capitale-Nationale	729.00		1978
Rivière-Bonaventure	Gaspésie–Îles-de-la-Madeleine		199	1980
Rivière-Cap-Chat	Gaspésie–Îles-de-la-Madeleine		56.6	1992
Rivière-Dartmouth	Gaspésie–Îles-de-la-Madeleine		63.10	1983
Rivière-de-la-Trinité	Côte-Nord		73	1986
Rivière-des-Escoumins	Côte-Nord		34	1992
Rivière-Jacques-Cartier	Capitale-Nationale		42	1991
Rivière-Laval	Côte-Nord		45.5	1980
Rivière-Madeleine	Gaspésie–Îles-de-la-Madeleine		115.8	1992
Rivière-Matane	Bas-Saint-Laurent		102	1992
Rivière-Mitis	Bas-Saint-Laurent		43.9	1993
Rivière-Moisie	Côte-Nord		43.9	1993
Rivière-Nouvelle	Gaspésie–Îles-de-la-Madeleine		86.2	1997
Rivière-Petit-Saguenay	Saguenay–Lac-Saint-Jean		14	1998
Rivière-Rimouski	Bas-Saint-Laurent		18	1993
Rivière-Sainte-Marguerite	Saguenay–Lac-Saint-Jean		184.4	1980
Rivière-Saint-Jean-du-Saguenay	Saguenay–Lac-Saint-Jean		12.2	1994
Rivières-Godbout-et-Mistassini	Côte-Nord		90	1980
Rivière-York	Gaspésie–Îles-de-la-Madeleine		94.1	1980
Saint-Patrice	Outaouais	1,348.00		1980
Saint-Romain	Estrie	19.70		2002
Tawachiche	Mauricie	318.00		1978
Trinité	Côte-Nord	328.20		1986
Varin	Côte-Nord	484.50		1978
Wessonneau	Mauricie	805.30		1978
