= Zec Buteux–Bas-Saguenay =

Controlled harvesting area in Quebec, Canada

- Location within Quebec
- Nearest city: Baie-Sainte-Catherine
- Coordinates: 48°03′00″N 69°55′00″W
- Area: 258.7
- Established: 1978
- Governing body: Association Chasse et Pêche Petit-Saguenay Saint-Siméon Inc.

The ZEC Buteux-Bas-Saguenay is a "zone d'exploitation contrôlée" (controlled harvesting area) (ZEC) within the municipality Baie-Sainte-Catherine, in Charlevoix-Est Regional County Municipality, in the administrative region of the Capitale-Nationale, Quebec, Canada.

== Toponymy ==
The toponym "ZEC Buteux-Bas-Saguenay" refers to Buteux Lake, located on the territory of the ZEC. This lake is part of the lower areas of the Saguenay River.

Jacques Buteux (Abbeville, France, 1599 - Trois-Rivières, 1652), Jesuit, came to Quebec City in 1634. He was immediately assigned to the mission of Trois-Rivières where he became superior in 1639. Father Buteux made his first voyage in Attikameks region, in the upper basin of the Saint-Maurice River in 1651. He wrote a "relation journal" about his first trip in Haute-Mauricie. On his second voyage, the next year, at the same place, Father Buteux was then accompanied by a sixty Attikameks, some French and a Hurons. Unfortunately, he was then attacked and killed by Iroquois.

The name "Zec Buteux-Bas-Saguenay" was formalized on August 5, 1982 at the Bank of place names in the Commission de toponymie du Québec (Geographical Names Board of Quebec).

== Geography ==
Zec Buteux Bas-Saguenay is located in a forested area in the municipality of Baie-Sainte-Catherine, east of Zec de l'Anse-Saint-Jean and south of Saguenay Fjord National Park. This is the closest ZEC to the mouth of the Saguenay River. The relief of the ZEC is mountainous. Brébeuf lake that has an elongated form from the north-west direction towards the south-east, is the most significant body of water of the ZEC.

This ZEC has camping sites equipped for visitors including Lake If, Baribeau (1), Baribeau (2), "Islands" and Buteux. A loading dock is fitted at "Lac des Îles" (Lake of Islands). Backcountry camping is also popular. The docking station Baribeau is located directly on the route 170. The second docking station is located at 31 rue Port-aux-Quilles; to get there, visitors must take the route 138 along the Saint Lawrence River and turn left into rue Port-aux-Quilles. The docking station is 5 km on the way.

== See also ==
- Baie-Sainte-Catherine, municipality
- Saguenay River
- Charlevoix-Est Regional County Municipality (MRC)
- Capitale-Nationale
- Zone d'exploitation contrôlée (Controlled Harvesting Zone) (ZEC)
