= Zec Normandie =

- Location within Quebec
- Location: Canada, Quebec, Antoine-Labelle Regional County Municipality
- Nearest city: Lac-Bazinet (unorganized territory)
- Coordinates: 47°22′00″N 74°43′03″W
- Area: 1,018 square kilometres (393 sq mi)
- Established: 1978
- Governing body: Association de chasse et pêche Beloeil (Lac-Saint-Paul)

The Zec Normandie is a "zone d'exploitation contrôlée" (controlled harvesting zone) (ZEC) located in the unorganized territories of the Lac-Bazinet, Lac-De la Bidière, and Lac-Oscar in the Antoine-Labelle Regional County Municipality in the administrative region of Laurentides in Quebec, in Canada.

== Geography ==
Located at the extreme northern region of the Laurentian Mountains, the territory of the Zec Normandie covers an area of 1,018 km^{2}. The eastern boundary of the ZEC is about 70 km northwest of Saint-Michel-des-Saints. More than 175 lakes have been identified in this vast territory, whose Némiscachingue lake covering 17 square kilometers is the most important.

In summary, the limitations of the ZEC are defined as:

- on the west side, the Zec Mitchinamecus (defined in part by "rivière Pin Rouge" (Red Pine river) (northern part of the ZEC)) and more or less Mitchinamecus river (for a segment of the southwestern part of the ZEC). Note: Parent (southbound) trail follows the route of the Pin Rouge River;
- on the north side by the road of Parent;
- on the east side by a series of lakes: Némiscachingue, Badajoz, Gooseneck, down south to the limit of Zec Mazana;
- on the south-east: the Zec Mazana.

Path to reach the entrance station: Take the route 309 via Mont Saint-Michel; take the road to Parent up to km no. 7.

Zec Normandie offers camping sites on its territory for a short stay on the shores of lakes Parent, Orthès and "de la Table". A restaurant-convenience store with gasoline is located at km 85 in front of West Lake Parent campground. ZEC also offers rental cabins, located at Lake Parent and Némis. Picking wild berries is very popular in the middle of the ZEC summer: strawberries, raspberries, blueberries, wild edible mushrooms ...

== History ==
The territory of the Zec Normandie has a lot of remains of the forestry history in northern Mont-Laurier. The remains of the Old Red Pine, group of buildings that served as headquarters for the "garde-feu" (fender), are still visible on the banks of the "rivière du lièvre" (Hare river). This river originates in the territory of the ZEC. The work of monitoring of forest land by the fender was essential for the safety of users of the forest and wood protection.

During the long period of "drave" (log driving), the Lievre River has experienced many tragedies of drowning or other accidents involving loggers, of which at Rapid of "Scie Ronde" (Rounded saw) and "Chute à Sinaï" (Fall Sinai). The history book "Les pionniers de la Lièvre" (Pioneers of Hare) tells the story of forestry on the "Haute Lièvre" (Upper Hare), that is the actual territory of the ZEC.

The outdoor enthusiasts can hike with interpretation of the log drive on the trail along the "Sentier des Draveurs" (river Draveurs) along "rivière du Lièvre", it rapids and it falls.

== Hunting and Fishing ==
Zec home many species of wildlife including: bears, moose, mink, otter, Marten, beaver, porcupine and lynx.

On the territory of the ZEC, the hunting is depending on different times of the year, hunting gear type, sectors, gender animals (moose) for the following species: moose, black Bear, grouse, hare and woodcock.

Fish abound in water bodies of the area. Fishing is depending on quota for the following species: brook trout, lake trout, perch, northern pike and walleye.

== Toponymy ==
The name of the ZEC is directly originated from Lake Normandie, which is formed by a widening of the river du Pin Rouge. The latter runs just outside the western boundary, in the Zec Mitchinamecus. A regional map of 1930 refers to Lake Normandie. The name recalls an ancient province of France from which many French Canadians and where many Canadian soldiers fought in the two world wars.

The name "Zec Normandie" was formalized on August 5, 1982 at the Bank of place names in the (Commission de toponymie du Québec - Geographical Names Board of Quebec).

== Attachments ==
=== Related articles ===
- Lac-Bazinet, unorganized territory
- Antoine-Labelle, regional county municipality
- Laurentides, administrative region of Quebec
- Zec Mazana
- Zec Mitchinamecus
- Zone d'exploitation contrôlée (Controlled Harvesting Zone) (ZEC)

=== External links ===
- Official website
