= Zec de la Rivière-aux-Rats =

- Location within Quebec
- Location: Canada, Quebec, Maria-Chapdelaine Regional County Municipality
- Nearest city: Dolbeau-Mistassini
- Coordinates: 49°38′00″N 72°15′00″W
- Area: 1,781 square kilometres (688 sq mi)
- Established: 1978

The zec de la Rivière-aux-Rats is a "zone d'exploitation contrôlée" (controlled harvesting zone) (ZEC) in the unorganized territory of Rivière-Mistassini, in the Maria-Chapdelaine Regional County Municipality, in the administrative region of Saguenay-Lac-Saint-Jean, in Quebec, in Canada.

== Geography ==
Covering 1,781 square kilometers, the "zec de la Rivière-aux-Rats" is the third greatest zec in Quebec in term of area and the largest in the administrative region of Saguenay-Lac-Saint-Jean. The southern boundary of the ZEC is located about 30 km north of Dolbeau-Mistassini.

ZEC has a forested road network of 640 kilometers. ZEC has 355 lakes, 80 are used for recreative fishing. The four rivers of the Zec are all used for recreative fishing.

The main entrance station of Zec is located north of Dolbeau-Mistassini. Path to get there: from the route 169 to Dolbeau-Mistassini, continue on route 169 South to rang Saint-Louis. Continue on Route des Trappistes; continue on Main Street; continue on rang Saint-Joseph. Turn right on the gravel road to the entrance station. Phone at the reception station: 418-276-4629.

== Hunting and Fishing ==
At the benefice of hunters, the wild animal are abundant in forests of the Zec. Hunters should refer to the website of the Zec in order to verify the hunting regulation. Hunting is depending on the species, the quota and conditions, the type of gear hunting and periods of the year. ZEC has a code of ethics for the moose.

Recreational fishing is prolific in water bodies authorized by the Zec. ZEC applies a quota for the following species: Brook trout, lake trout and pike. The brook trout is usually more common in the lakes of the northern part of the ZEC; while the pike is generally more common in lakes at the South.

== Key Benefits ==
ZEC offers a chalet accommodation service at Satellite Camp. ZEC offers separated campsite with strips wooded at camping "Beaver Lake".

For sports river, visitors can enjoy camping canoeing on the Rivière aux Rats (Lac-Saint-Jean) for a distance of over 25 km.

== Toponymy ==
The French toponym "Zec de la Rivière-aux-Rats" was formalized on 5 August 1982 at the Bank of place names in the Commission de toponymie du Québec (Geographical Names Board of Quebec)

== See also ==
=== Related articles ===
- Rivière-Mistassini, unorganized territory
- Maria-Chapdelaine Regional County Municipality, (RCM)
- Saguenay-Lac-Saint-Jean, an administrative region in Quebec
- Dolbeau-Mistassini
- Zone d'exploitation contrôlée (Controlled harvesting zone) (ZEC)
