= Zec des Nymphes =

Création de Zec des Nymphes
- Location within Quebec
- Location: Canada, Quebec, Matawinie Regional County Municipality
- Nearest city: Saint-Zénon
- Coordinates: 46°31′N 73°39′W
- Area: 27,510 square kilometres (10,620 sq mi)
- Established: 1979
- Governing body: Association chasse et pêche des Nymphes inc

The ZEC des Nymphes is a "zone d'exploitation contrôlée" (controlled harvesting zone] (ZEC) in the municipality of Saint-Zénon, in Matawinie Regional County Municipality (MRC), in the administrative region of Lanaudière, in Quebec, in Canada.

Since its inception in 1979, the ZEC is administered by the "Association chasse et pêche des Nymphes inc" (Fishing and Hunting Association of Nymphs inc).

== Geography ==
The "Zec des Nymphes" covers 171 square kilometers in the municipalities of Mandeville, Saint-Damien and is Saint-Zénon. ZEC is located thirty miles north of Saint-Émilie-de-l'Énergie in the northern region of Berthierville. ZEC has 123 lakes, as well as Mastigouche River, which drains water of this large territory in the administrative region of Lanaudière.

ZEC is 1 hour 15 from Montreal, by using Autoroute 31. The outdoor adepts can enter in the country with their boat or use the rental service rowboats offered by the ZEC.

'Entrance stations'

ZEC has three entrance stations:

- Zénon entrance station- Journey to get there: from Joliette follow route 131 north towards Saint-Zénon. A few kilometers before the village, turn left, take the path De Courcelles. The docking station is on the right.
- Champagne entrance station- Journey to get there: from Joliette, take route 131 north towards Saint-Zénon. At the end of the village turn right on the Champagne route. Then follow the "chemin du Lac Saint-Stanislas" (road of Lake St. Stanislaus) to get to #1001.
- Mandeville entrance station- Journey to get there: Follow the route 131 north. Pass the village and Golf Club of Saint-Jean-de-Matha, turn right on the route 347 South, towards Saint-Damien. Skip this village, follow the signs for Mandeville. In the village, turn left on St-Charles-Borrommé up the road, called Branch Left. The entrance station of the zec is a few minutes.

== Hunting and fishing ==
The brook trout is the queen of water bodies of the ZEC. The abundance of aquatic fauna result of sound management of sowing to excellent spawning sites and natural regeneration of native trout in several lakes including the following lakes: "lac à la Pluie" (Rainy Lake), "lac des Îles" (lake of Islands), "lac Wolfe", "lac petit Mastigouche" and in rivers and stream. Wading can be done along the Gauthier River, the Mastigouche River and the Saint-Ignace stream.

The anglers can fish the trout lake, rainbow trout, the bass, the pike and the perch. The brook trout from Rupert root abounds in the Civille lake.

In Zec, sport hunting is on for the following species: grouse, the ruffed grouse and hare. The quota also applies to hunting the moose, depending on the time of year, sex, type of animals and hunting weapon type. In spring, the bear hunting is becoming more popular.

Given the proximity of Montreal, many hunters and fishermen come from major Canadian and American cities.

== Key attractions ==
The outdoor users will appreciate especially the wild beauty of Merisier (Cherry Lake), "lac Croche", "lac Vert" (Green Lake) or Gauthier River.

Users of the ZEC can practice many outdoor activities including: mountain biking, hiking, observing flora and fauna, kayak, canoe camping, swimming at various beaches (Lake Islands, Lake Gauthier, Lake Saint-Jacques, Crystal Lake and Lake Cherry). During the summer, many wild berry pickers will have rendezvous in the ZEC, including raspberries, cranberries, blueberries, serviceberry, the chokecherry and wild edible mushrooms.

Users can also practice quad/ATV/snowmobile. Zec nymphs provides users several sites primitive campgrounds including five sites with electrical service, all located on beautiful sites.

== Toponymy ==
The ZEC was established in 1979. The place name is derived from the name of the "Lac des Nymphes" (lake of nymphs) located in the unorganized territory of Baie-de-la-Bouteille, outside the boundary of the ZEC, in the Mastigouche Wildlife Reserve. A nymph is an insect with complete metamorphosis. The nymph evokes the intermediate stage between a larva or worm, and the complete insect. Originally anglers probably used this name that has become widely recognized among outdoor fishermen to designate the lake. Fly (nymph) is performed using the hook with a fly drowned representing a nymph bait. The gazebo at the rear of the rectory of Saint-Zénon, you can admire the valley of the Rivière Sauvage (Wild River) which is designated "Casting Nymphs".

The name "ZEC Nymphs" was formalized August 5, 1982 at the Bank of place names in the Commission de toponymie du Québec (Geographical Names Board of Quebec).

== See also ==
=== Related articles ===
- Mastigouche River
- Mastigouche Wildlife Reserve
- Saint-Émilie-de-l'Énergie, municipality
- Saint-Zénon, municipality
- Berthierville, municipality
- Zone d'exploitation contrôlée (Controlled harvesting zone) (ZEC) of Quebec

=== External links ===
- Official website of ZEC des Nymphes
