= Zec de la Rivière-Madeleine =

Regulated fishing zone in Quebec

- Location within Quebec
- Location: Canada
- Coordinates: 49°07′30″N 65°24′30″W
- Area: length of 1,158 square kilometres (447 sq mi)
- Established: 1992
- Governing body: La société de gestion de la Rivière Madeleine

The Zec Rivière-Madeleine is a "zone d'exploitation contrôlée" (controlled harvesting zone) (ZEC) located in the unorganized territory of Mont-Albert, La Haute-Gaspésie Regional County Municipality, Gaspésie-Îles-de-la-Madeleine, Quebec, Canada. The main purpose of the ZEC is to manage the salmon fishing. Since 1992, the "Corporation de développement de la rivière Madeleine" administers this salmon ZEC.

== Geography ==
The Madeleine River turns out to be one of the largest rivers of the northern coast of Gaspésie. It rises at the foot of "mont de la table" (Table Mountain), in the conservation park of Gaspésie. Descending the mountains, the river meanders toward north for a distance of about 120 km to empty into the Gulf of St. Lawrence, at the height of the Municipality of Sainte-Madeleine-de-la-Rivière-Madeleine.

Access roads to the ZEC

1. Access Road to Grand Falls (fishway). From a corner of route 132 in village of the municipality of Sainte-Madeleine-de-la-Rivière-Madeleine, visitors can reach the fishway in taking the road up the river (toward south), the same that Domtar forested enterprise used. With a length of 10 kilometres (6.2 mi), this road is narrow and serpentine.
1. Access road by road Grande-Vallée to Murdochville. This road is the most passable to access in the ZEC. It runs along the Madeleine River from "Lac de la ferme" (Lake of the Farm) to "Rapide Blanc" (White Rapids). From the road, there are few access (trails) to the river. From "Lac de la Ferme" to Belanger Creek, visitors go to the river by canoe.
1. Access to the upstream part of the "Rapide Blanc" (White Rapid) by road of "Lac du Diable" (Devil's Lake). This paved road crosses the route 132, about 2 miles west of Sainte-Madeleine-de-la-Rivière-Madeleine. This route takes the south to reach areas 3, 4 and 5 of the Madeleine River.

== Salmon fishing ==
Madeleine River has 74 salmon pits which are spread over about 120 miles of the river. The river has a lot of salmon runs throughout the season.

Formerly a falls designated "Grand-Sault" (the Grand Falls), with a height of 25 metres (82 ft), prevented salmon to move up in the river. In 1968, the Quebec government has built the longest fish ladder underground of the world, to bring salmon to bypass this natural obstacle. This pass includes a tunnel of 140 metres (460 ft) long, specially fitted into the rock of the mountain. With this pass, salmon pass this barrier to spawn upstream in the pits of the river. A dozen of these pits are subject to quotas, others have free access to recreative fishing.

All pits are easily accessible by forest roads or on foot. About 80% of pits permit wading fishing. With the river bottom in gravel with stones and pebbles, the water remains clear throughout the season, generating favorable fishing conditions.

Besides salmon, only three species of fish frequent the Madeleine River: the brook trout, slimy sculpin and the American eel. A random preseason and 48 hours prints in advance for the salmon fishing apply to certain quotas for somme sectors.

== History ==
The lease of the manor of the Rivière-de-la-Madeleine, signed on May 30, 1679, awarded Antoine cadde a territory that stretched wide by a mile of either side "de la rivière de la Magdelaine" and two miles deep. In Lower Canada, the manorial system was terminated in 1854.

In 1925, the Brown Corporation acquires the territory of the former lord. This company developed the sport fishing on the river for the benefit of its employees, officers and customers. In 1963, Domtar bought this land in order to benefit a hundred guests annually. Only the lower part of the river, downstream of the fall of "Grand-Sault", was then in operation for recreative salmon fishing. At the time, the catches were limited between 60 and 300 salmon a year.

As part of the development of the salmon resource, the Ministry of Tourism, Hunting and Fishing of the Government of Quebec was built in 1968, a fishway so that salmon can bypass the "Grand-Sault" (Great Falls) to migrate further up the river. In 1984, recreative fishing is allowed on the new territory which became accessible to salmon. That same year, the department has identified 466 salmon which passed through the fishway. Since 1987, thanks to a sustained program of seeding, salmon runs have averaged 1358 salmon per year.

Founded in 1991, the "Corporation de développement de la rivière Madeleine", displayed many initiatives to better manage the operation of a river segment where recreative fishing activities were unchecked, apart from monitoring agents of the wildlife conservation.

In 1992, the administration of the new ZEC was assigned to "Corporation de développement de la rivière Madeleine". The "Société de gestion de la rivière Madeleine" currently administers the salmon ZEC.

== Toponymy ==
According to the Commission de toponymie du Québec (Geographical Names Board of Quebec), the place name "Madeleine" also applies to a dozen geographical entities in this Gaspésie region. Since 1679, several variants have been used such as: Maddalen, Magdeleine, Magdelaine and Madelaine. The origin of this name is unknown. Variation: Grande rivière Madeleine (Great River Madeleine).

The name Zec de la rivière-Madeleine was formalized on March 5, 1993 at the Bank of place names in the Commission de toponymie du Quebec (Geographical Names Board of Quebec).

== See also ==
- Madeleine River, municipality
- St. Lawrence Estuary
- Gaspésie
- Gaspésie National Park
- Mont-Albert, unorganized territory
- La Haute-Gaspésie Regional County Municipality
- Sainte-Madeleine-de-la-Rivière-Madeleine
- Zone d'exploitation contrôlée (controlled harvesting zone) (ZEC)
