= Zec Mazana =

- Location within Quebec
- Location: Canada, Quebec, Antoine-Labelle Regional County Municipality
- Nearest city: Lac-de-la-Pomme, unorganized territory
- Coordinates: 47°07′00″N 74°43′00″W
- Area: 734 square kilometres (283 sq mi)
- Established: 1978

The ZEC Mazana is a "zone d'exploitation contrôlée" (controlled harvesting zone) (ZEC) in the unorganized territories of Lac-de-la-Pomme, Lac-de-la-Bidière and Lac-Oscar, in Antoine-Labelle Regional County Municipality, in the administrative region of Laurentides in Quebec, in Canada.

Zec Mazana was created in 1978 to take over private clubs. The administration of the ZEC is entrusted to the "Association de chasse et pêche de Sainte-Agathe-des-monts", a non-profit organization. In 2014, a new association was mandated to continue the administration of the ZEC. The mission of the ZEC is to exploit the territory (such as hunting, fishing and camping activities), including its accessibility.

== Geography ==
Zec Mazana is located in forested area, in the mountains of Laurentian Mountains, north of the Mont-Tremblant National Park. It is bordered to the north and west by the Zec Normandie, southeast by the Zec Boullé, and to the south by the Zec de la Maison-de-Pierre. Its eastern border is located 6 km west of the center of Manawan. The extreme to the point of the territory of the ZEC is located 1.4 km from the Kaoskiwonatinak Mountain (596 m) which is part of the Zec Boullé.

The nearest town is Saint-Michel-des-Saints, located 44 km southeast (in direct line of the eastern boundary of Zec). ZEC is located 60 km north of Lac St-Paul in Antoine-Labelle Regional County Municipality.

The controlled harvesting zone (ZEC) of Mazana has an area of 734 square kilometers and has more than 200 lakes. With a length of 11 km and 1.7 km maximum wide, the lake Mazana is the main stream of the ZEC. It flows from the south-west in Mazana river which has a length of 35 km. On its way, the water stream pass through several lakes such as Bélisle, Chatillon, Bruneau and Pin. The latter lake receives water from the La Lièvre River (to the north) and Mazana River (to the east). On its way, the river Mazana collects water from streams Séré and Line. The lake Mazana is located in the far east; one of its bays is located 6 miles southwest of Manawan. Several lakes of Zec feature boat ramp into the water.

The main rivers of the ZEC are: "La Lièvre River" (south-west), Mazana River (which runs through the ZEC from east to west), Sere Creek (center), Line Creek (north), Klock Creek (at East) and Métabeskéga River (east).

The territory of the ZEC is accessible by forested road R1555, coming from Sainte-Anne-des-Lacs or Lake Pérodeau. The federated track for quad/snowmobile pass through the ZEC from north to south; and a branch of the trail goes to Manawan.

Route to reach the reception office of the Zec, located near Lake Clover (south-west of the zec) from Montreal, take the route 117; after the village of Lake Saguay turn right towards Falls-St-Philippe, towards Lac-St-Paul via the "chemin du progrès" (path of progress). At the white cross, turn right on the road Pérodeau. The entrance station is 50 km away. In this Zec, camping Renard (located in Fox Lake) has a mountain biking trail.

== Hunting and Fishing ==
In the ZEC, the outdoor amateurs can enjoy various recreational activities such as forest walks, quad/ATV, wild camping, picking wild berry, canoe/kayak river, fishing, hunting, the observation of the landscape, flora and fauna.

Given the wild nature of the territory of the ZEC, the wild animal is abundant. The quota species are applicable for: moose, black bear, grouse and hare. Hunting quotas apply depending on the time of year, the type of gear hunting, sex of the beast (moose) and the sectors. Hunters should refer to current regulations by visiting the website of the ZEC.

Fishes are generally abundant in water bodies in the zec. Recreative fishing is widespread for the following species which are subject to quotas: the brook trout (speckled trout), the lake trout (trout), walleye and pike.

== Toponymy ==
The specific "Mazana" refers to four places or territory, all located in the Antoine-Labelle Regional County Municipality: Zec Mazana (controlled harvesting zone), the Mazana pond, the lake Mazana and Mazana River (located in the unorganized territory of Lac-Oscar.

The name "Zec Mazana" was formalized on nAugust 5, 1982 at the Bank of place names in the Commission de toponymie du Québec (Geographical Names Board of Quebec).

=== See also ===
- Lac-de-la-Pomme, unorganized territory
- Antoine-Labelle Regional County Municipality
- Laurentides, administrative region of Quebec
- Zec de la Maison-de-Pierre
- Zec Boullé
- Zec Normandie
- Mazana Lake
- Zone d'exploitation contrôlée (Controlled Harvesting Zone) (ZEC)
