= Zec D'Iberville =

Zec d'Iberville
- Location within Quebec
- Location: Canada, Quebec, La Haute-Côte-Nord Regional County Municipality
- Nearest city: Forestville, Les Escoumins
- Coordinates: 48°36′N 69°30′W
- Area: 438 km^{2} (169 sq mi)
- Established: 1978
- Governing body: L'association Chasse & Pêche du Canton Iberville inc

The ZEC D'Iberville is a "zone d'exploitation contrôlée" (controlled harvesting zone) (ZEC) in the municipality of Longue-Rive, in the La Haute-Côte-Nord Regional County Municipality, in the administrative region of Côte-Nord, in Quebec, in Canada.

== History ==
"L'Association Chasse & Pêche du Canton Iberville inc" (Hunting & Fishing Association of Canton Iberville inc) was incorporated on February 23, 1978, under the name "Association Chasse & Pêche de Sault-au-Mouton" (Hunting & Fishing Association of Sault-au-Mouton). The new name that still exists today, was adopted on January 15, 1990. The zone d'exploitation contrôlée (controlled harvesting zone) (ZEC) of Iberville was established on June 17, 1978. The entrance station was built in 1981; previously, the ZEC was using a trailer to serve its customers.

== Geography ==
Zec Iberville has an area of 438 square kilometres (169 sq mi) on the north side of St. Lawrence River. It is situated between the Escoumins River and Cedar River (without ever reaching the banks of these rivers). Its territory includes 239 lakes in forested areas, of which 186 are operated for sport fishing. The main rivers of the ZEC are: "des Cèdres" (Cedar), "Aux Castors" (Beaver), Sault au Mouton, Truchon and "ruisseau des Cèdres" (Cedar Creek). Major lakes are: Louis Boucher, Romaine and "Petite Romaine".

ZEC has 65 km of passable road. A primitive campground and a campground with running water and sanitary service are located at 5 km and 30 km of the entrance station. To reach the entrance station of the Zec, visitors follow the forest path of Longue-Rive. The entrance station is located about 5 km in the forest, visitors can purchase a hunting license or fishing and the map of the ZEC. The ZEC is popular for canoe camping, hiking, primitive camping, hunting and fishing.

== Hunting and fishing ==
Lakes in Zec abound of brook trout and American eel. All rivers are accessible for recreative fishing. ZEC has several hiking trails and also secondary ATV trails. Boating enthusiasts can use a canoe trip down the Sault-au-Mouton River. ZEC has two river rides on its territory, one in canoe-camping. Picking wild berries such as blueberries, raspberries and strawberries is popular across the territory. ZEC is part of the hunting area 18 in Quebec. The hunting of wild animal is restricted by quotas depending the periods of hunting, the type of hunting gear or sex of animals (including calves) and the species: moose, black bear, hare, gélinotte and tétras.

== Toponymy ==
The name "ZEC D'Iberville" was formalized August 5, 1982 at the Bank of place names in the Commission de toponymie du Québec (Geographical Names Board of Quebec).

== See also ==
- Longue-Rive, municipality
- La Haute-Côte-Nord Regional County Municipality (RCM)
- North Shore, administrative region of Quebec
- St. Lawrence
- Zec Nordique
- Zone d'exploitation contrôlée (Controlled Harvesting Zone) (ZEC)
