= Zec de Labrieville =

- Location within Quebec
- Location: Canada, Quebec, La Haute-Côte-Nord Regional County Municipality
- Nearest city: Baie-Comeau
- Coordinates: 49°18′N 69°44′W
- Area: 427 square kilometres (165 sq mi)
- Established: 1978
- Administrator: Association chasse et pêche de Labrieville inc.

The ZEC Labrieville is a "zone d'exploitation contrôlée" (Controlled Harvesting Zone) (ZEC) in the Lac-au-Brochet (unorganized territory), in La Haute-Côte-Nord Regional County Municipality (MRC), in the administrative region of Côte-Nord (North Shore), in Quebec, in Canada. It was established in 1984.

== Geography ==
Zec Labrieville is located 84 km north of Forestville, on the Côte-Nord (North Shore) of St. Lawrence River. Zec is on the latter logging the territory of Anglo-Pulp company, which became Reed Paper, then Deshawa, the days when wood was transported by flotation on the Sault-aux-Pigs River. The wood was based on the Lake Sault aux Pigs to get into the St. Lawrence River.

Northwest of the country, the Pipmouacan Reservoir fueling hydro stations Bersimis-1 and Bersimis 2. Mckinley lakes and poles form the western boundary of the ZEC. Wawealton the lake is the eastern boundary. While lakes Joncas, Potvin, Valley, Lucien and Allard form the northern boundary.

Major lakes of Zec are: Abbot, Allard, André, Aux clams, Barnette, Bernier, Bourque, Brigitte, Brillon, Campaigne, Carter, Clark, Cooke, De l'Épinoche, De la Butte, De la Vallée, Deguise, Du Barbu, Du Lotus, Dufresne, Dupuis, Fillion, Francine, François, Fred, Gisèle, Goeffrion, Hébert, Henderson, Hickie, Isidore, Joe, Joncas, Juliette, Labossière, Latreuille, Lauzon, Lave, Lucien, Lyla, Marshall, Marteau, McQueen, Mikita (lac René), Mins, Moore, Petit lac aux Clams, Petit lac Isidore, Pico, Pigot, Potvin, Quiache, Read, Rousseau, Simpson, Tom, Wapouche, Willow and XX.

Zec Labrieville covers an area of 427 square kilometres (165 sq mi). The zec includes 324 lakes of which, over 150 are accessible and 200 are used for recreative fishing. ZEC has 24 rivers of which six are used for recreative fishing.

The journey to reach the sole access to the ZEC de Labrieville post entrance is via the route 385, where you have to drive 84 km from Forestville, on a paved road. The entrance station is located immediately after a Hydro-Québec station.

ZEC offers a service of cottage (rental) at camp no. 3 and rustic campsites in its territory.

== Toponymy ==
Three names "Labrieville" are places in the unorganized territory of the Lac-au-Brochet in the Regional County Municipality of La Haute-Côte-Nord Regional County Municipality: Labrieville (locality), Zec de Labrieville and Labrieville-Sud (Labrieville-South) (locality).

The name "Zec Labrieville" was formalized on August 5, 1982, at the Bank of place names in the Commission de toponymie du Québec (Geographical Names Board of Quebec).

== Hunting and Fishing ==
Artificial reservoir created by the central Bersimis-1 and Bersimis-2 techniques create water bodies where conditions are favorable for recreative fishing of Northern pike. Anglers can also indulge in fishing for speckled trout and lake trout in lakes Sault-aux-Pigs and Kacuscanus, near the ZEC. The hydroelectric plant Bersimis-1 generating station is just in front of the entrance station of the zec. And Forest Products sawmill Labrieville Inc. is located nearby. Fish quotas are applicable for these species: lake trout, the brook trout and perch.

Regarding hunting activities in the territory, hunting quotas are applicable for these species: moose, american black bear, grouse and hare.

== See also ==
=== Related articles ===
- Lac-au-Brochet, an unorganized territory
- La Haute-Côte-Nord Regional County Municipality (MRC)
- North Shore, administrative region of Quebec
- Labrieville (locality)
- Zone d'exploitation contrôlée (Controlled harvesting zone) (ZEC)
