= Zec Festubert =

- Location within Quebec
- Location: Canada, Québec, La Vallée-de-l'Or Regional County Municipality, Senneterre
- Coordinates: 47°55′01″N 75°54′58″W
- Area: 1,429 km^{2} (552 sq mi)
- Established: March 6th, 1978

The ZEC Festubert is a "zone d'exploitation contrôlée" (controlled harvesting zone) (ZEC), located in the municipality of Senneterre, in the La Vallée-de-l'Or Regional County Municipality, in the administrative region of Abitibi-Témiscamingue, in Quebec, in Canada. The mission of the ZEC includes the protection of flora and fauna.

== Geography ==
Incorporated on March 6, 1978, Zec Festubert covers an area of 1,429 km^{2}. This "zone d'exploitation contrôlée" (controlled harvesting zone) has 148 lakes, 120 are used for recreative fishing. This area has four rivers all run for fishing. ZEC has three boat ramps water.

The entrance station of Zec Festubert is open from Victoria Day (in May) and close around the end of the moose hunting with rifle (in October). Path to reach the docking station Landron: Route 117 between Mont-Laurier to Val d'Or. Access options to the ZEC:

- Mileage 285 on route 117, via Lépine Road;
- at kilometer 380 from Highway 117; via Highway 30 (CIP); via the Zec Capitachouane (460 miles from Montreal).

== Toponymy ==
The name of Zec joins the township, the river, the village and the lake of the same name. These names evoke the participation of Canadian-French troops in the British campaign in May 1915 in the village of Festubert, in France. Among the Allies, over 7,000 men lost their lives. The Allies won a victory there against the Germans on July 12, 1918, The village of Festubert is located in the department of Pas-de-Calais, about sixty miles southeast of Dunkirk and equidistant from Courcelette, south.

The name "Zec Festubert" was formalized on August 5, 1982, at the Bank of place names in the Commission de toponymie du Québec (Geographical Names Board of Quebec).

== Hunting and fishing ==
The territory of the ZEC has been divided into 28 sectors, to better distribute the hunting areas and provide better security for users. All-terrain vehicles (ATVs) are prohibited from use during the hunting season, except for the transportation of wild animal killed.

Hunting small animals mainly concerns ruffed grouse, the partridge, the hare and grouse of Canada. Hunting is regulated by the periods indicated by the department for quota species. Given the abundance of wild animals, hunting black bear and the mouse is limited.

Anglers can catch pike and "Doré" (yellow or black) on all exploited lakes. ZEC is in the hunting and fishing number 13 zone.

== See also ==
=== Related articles ===
- Abitibi-Témiscamingue, administrative region of Quebec
- La Vallée-de-l'Or Regional County Municipality (RCM)
- Senneterre, Quebec
- Zone d'exploitation contrôlée (Controlled harvesting zone) (ZEC)
