= Zec Chapais =

- Location within Quebec
- Location: Kamouraska Regional County Municipality
- Nearest city: La Pocatière
- Coordinates: 47°12′N 69°41′W
- Area: 388 km^{2} (150 sq mi)
- Established: 1978
- Governing body: Société de gestion de la faune de Kamouraska inc

The ZEC Chapais is a "zone d'exploitation contrôlée" (ZEC, or "controlled harvesting zone") located within the municipality of Mont-Carmel and the unorganized territory of Petit-Lac-Sainte-Anne in the Kamouraska Regional County Municipality, in the administrative region of Bas-Saint-Laurent, in Quebec, in Canada.

== Geography ==
Covering an area of 388 square kilometres (150 sq mi) in Notre Dame Mountains, the entrance to the ZEC Chapais is located about 15 km southeast of La Pocatière, on the south shore of the Saint Lawrence River. Zec extends to the American border where she shares the border of 12 km; while on the American side (State of Maine), an equivalent and related protected territory extends south for 5.3 km.

ZEC has 12 lakes (six of which operated for sport fishing) and six rivers, all operated for recreative fishing. The main water bodies of the ZEC are: "East Lake" (French: "Lac de l'Est"), the "Five Miles Lake" (French: "Lac des Cinq Milles")," Lost Lake (French: Lac Perdu), the "Lake of the Marais" (French: Lac des Marais), the Tinoute Lake and Lake boiler (French: lac Chaudière). The territory of the ZEC is crossed in its center by the Wolfe River (French: Rivière du Loup, which flows north to go to pour on the southeast of the St. Lawrence River shoreline. Its tributary Manie River (French: "rivière Manie") drains the northeastern part of the territory of the ZEC.

Southwest side, near the US border, the "Mountain Tour" (French: "Montagne de la Tour") (elevation: 644 m) and the "Mountain of the Five Miles" (French: "Montagne des Cinq Milles") (elevation: 585 m) peak of the surrounding territory.

The three entrance stations are located: Lac Ste Anne, Saint-Omer and "Brittany". ZEC has two campsites accessible by car: Lac Ste Anne (southwest) and "Lac Chaudière" (at north).

== Wildlife ==
This controlled harvesting zone has about a dozen small lakes populated mostly by brook trout and char.

Major lakes on the ZEC that are authorized for recreational fishing are: "étang de l'écluse" (pond of the Lock) (with an access ramp to the water), "Lac Blanc" (White Lake), lake Chaudière, lake Davison, lake Grosse truite (with an access ramp to the water), lake of the President, lake Sainte-Anne and the Little lake Sainte-Anne. Certain rules of daily contingency fishery apply depending on the time of year, the lakes, the type of gear... Anglers can learn about the rules by visiting the official website of the ZEC: Official site of the ZEC.

On the territory of the ZEC, the hunting contingency is on for moose, the black bear and small animal. Contingency reflects the particular hunting seasons depending on the species of animal, the type of gear hunting (archery, firearm, collar...), sex of the animals (or calves).

== Toponymy ==
The designation of this area is related to the toponym of the township and village nearby. This gazetteer designation was chosen in memory of Jean-Charles Chapais (1811-1885), who was a businessman and a Quebec politician. He is considered one of the fathers of the Canadian Confederation for his participation in the Quebec Conference, 1864 to determine the shape of the future Government of Canada.

The toponym "ZEC Chapais" was formalized on August 5, 1982, at the Bank of place names in the Commission de toponymie du Québec (Geographical Names Board of Québec).

== See also ==
=== Related articles ===
- St. Lawrence River
- Bas-Saint-Laurent, administrative region of Quebec
- Kamouraska Regional County Municipality
- La Pocatière, a municipality
- Saint-Omer
- Sainte-Perpétue, l'Islet
- Mont-Carmel
- Notre Dame Mountains, chain of mountains
- Zone d'exploitation contrôlée (Controlled Harvesting Zone) (ZEC)
