= Zec Varin =

Controlled harvesting zone in Canada

- Location within Quebec
- Location: Manicouagan Regional County Municipality
- Nearest city: Baie-Comeau
- Coordinates: 49°32′N 68°34′W
- Area: 484.5 square kilometres (187.1 sq mi)
- Established: 1978
- Governing body: Association Plein air Rivière Outardes inc

Zec Varin is a controlled harvesting zone (French: zone d'exploitation controlée, ZEC) in the unorganized territory of Rivière-aux-Outardes, in Manicouagan Regional County Municipality, Côte-Nord, in Quebec, in Canada.

== Geography ==
Zec Varin covers 484.5 km^{2}. It has 85 lakes, of which 60 are used for recreational fishing, and 15 rivers, of which 9 are used for recreational fishing.

It is bounded on the east by route 389, and on the west by the Outardes River. Its northern boundary is located in the hamlet of Micoua and Lake à la Pêche.

28 km from Baie-Comeau, route 389 crosses the Manicouagan River at the Jean-Lesage generating station (formerly Manic-2). Zec Varin can be reached either by leaving route 389 near Lake Legendre on the road to Lac Gaston, which crosses the ZEC in an east–west direction, or by continuing to the Daniel-Johnson Dam (formerly Manic-5) and entering the ZEC much further north, at Fermont or Labrador City.

The primary rivers in Zec Varin are the Antrim and the Outardes; the main creeks are the Bacon and the Émond. Lake Varin, located east centrally in the ZEC, has a length of 5700 m and a width of 500 m. It covers 332.4 hectares.

=== Entrance stations ===
The entrance stations of the Zec are divided into three areas:

- Entrance station for area 1 (46 km on route 389) is the main reception station, located near Lake Catherine. If the office is closed visitors can register at the "Le Coin du Nord" convenience store, located at the intersection of routes 138 and 389 or the "Le Repos du Passant" restaurant at Jean-Lesage generating station, located at the 24 km point on route 389.
- Entrance station for area 2 (at 76 km on route 389).
- Entrance station for area 3: there is no guard at the reception station and the sector has no maintained road network.

== Hunting and fishing ==
Fish and wildlife are abundant in the wilderness. Limits apply to hunting within the ZEC, depending in particular on the time of year, the type of hunting gear, and the animal's sex (moose) for the following species: moose, black bear, grouse and hare.

Fishing is restricted for the following species: freshwater salmon, lake trout and brook trout.

== History ==
In 1961, the area was used by two private clubs, the "Vive la joie" and the "Feux follets". There were 40 cabins, available for private use only. In 1978, following the adoption by the Government of Quebec of a law giving open access to many areas of public land, the two clubs were merged to become the Association Plein air Rivière Outardes Inc. The government assigned the right to administer the ZEC to this association.

== Toponymy ==
The name "Zec Varin" derives from Lake Varin, one of the main lakes of the ZEC. It is a north-south lake located on the east side of the ZEC, near route 389. It is named for Jean-Victor Varin de la Marre (1699 – after 1780), an administrator who came to Canada in 1729 and returned to France in 1758. He was appointed secretary to the king of New France.

The name "Zec Varin" was formally entered in the register of placenames of the Commission de toponymie du Québec on August 5, 1982.

== See also ==
=== Related article ===
- Baie-Comeau, a city
- Rivière-aux-Outardes, an unorganized territory of Quebec
- Manicouagan Regional County Municipality (RCM)
- Côte-Nord (North-Shore), an administrative region of Quebec
- Zone d'exploitation contrôlée (controlled harvesting zone) (zec)
