= Zec Capitachouane =

- Location within Quebec
- Location: La Vallée-de-l'Or Regional County Municipality, in Abitibi-Témiscamingue
- Nearest city: Val d'Or
- Coordinates: 48°N 77°W
- Area: 858 km (533 mi)
- Established: 1978
- Governing body: L'Association de chasse et pêche Rousillon inc.

The ZEC Capitachouane is a zone d'exploitation contrôlée (Controlled Harvesting Zone) (ZEC), located in the municipality of Senneterre in the RCM La Vallée-de-l'Or Regional County Municipality, in the administrative region of Abitibi-Témiscamingue and partially in the Outaouais region, Quebec, Canada.

This ZEC is administered by the "Association de chasse et pêche Rousillon inc".

== Geography ==
The ZEC covers a wild and completely forested area. It is located northeast of Cabonga Reservoir and southeast of the city of Val d'Or, north of the Zec Petawaga and directly adjacent to Zec Festubert.

The ZEC has 88 lakes (52 of which are operated for fishing) and 10 rivers (five used for fishing). The two largest lakes are Bouchette Lake (973 hectares or 2,400 acres) and Landron lake (1,197 hectares or 2,960 acres). Other major lakes are: Aveluy, des Trois Baies (Three Bays), Bailleul, Bonaparte, Bimbo, Cather, Chip, Danin, Farrington, Fayolle, Fitzgerald, Fricourt, Graincourt Gregg, Griffith, Harris, Hopkins, Kâmakadewagamik, Kean, Kessler, Leask, Lindsay, Loucks, Martin, Maxwell, Proville, Rawlinson, Reynolds, Rock, Round, Simionescu, Thiepval, Weber and Young.

The main rivers of the ZEC are: Berlinge, Festubert, Chochocouane and Capitachouane; lake head of the latter (flowing south-west) is the Capitachouane lake.

Camping is allowed in the ZEC, as well as the installation of a trailer. Access to the area is via Route 117, connecting Mont-Laurier to Val d'Or. The main forest road is R0713. Secondary access roads are: R0715 and R0716.

== Wildlife ==
Hunting quotas are regulated by the ZEC based on species, periods and the type of hunting gear. Species governed by hunting quotas are including the moose, American black bear, gélinotte (grouse) and tétras (grouse).

Lakes abound with several types of fish: brook trout, lake trout, perch, pike and walleye.

== Toponymy ==
This name of Amerindian origin of the Algonquin Nation means "long water course". Three names use the term "Capitachouane": the Zec, the lake and the river.

The toponym "Zec Capitachouane" was formalized on August 5, 1982, by the Commission de toponymie du Québec (Geographical Names Board of Québec).
