= Zec Owen =

- Location within Quebec
- Location: Canada, Quebec, Témiscouata Regional County Municipality
- Nearest city: Dégelis
- Coordinates: 47°41′N 68°29′W
- Area: 615 square kilometres (237 sq mi)
- Established: 1978
- Governing body: Fédération chasse pêche Owen
- Website: Official website

The ZEC Owen is a "zone d'exploitation contrôlée" (controlled harvesting zone) (ZEC) in the municipality of Lejeune in the Témiscouata Regional County Municipality (RCM), in the administrative region of Bas-Saint-Laurent, in Quebec, in Canada.

Owen Controlled harvesting zone was established in 1978 by the Government of Quebec, in the process of attribution of public lands to nonprofit organism instead of private clubs. In 1978, the "Fédération de Chasse et Pêche Owen" (Owen Hunting and Fishing Federation) was constituted as a non-profit organization bringing together four sports associations. Only two of these associations remain today: "Association de Loisir, Plein air, Chasse et Pêche Baseley inc" and the "Club sportif des Biens de Même inc". The headquarters of the Federation is located at the Squatec City Hall

== Geography ==
ZEC is located in the administrative region of Bas-Saint-Laurent, near the borders of New Brunswick and Rimouski Wildlife Reserve. The border Quebec-New Brunswick serves as the boundary to the east limit of the ZEC. The Madawaska River serves as southern boundary of the ZEC. The route 185 between Dégelis with Edmundston in New Brunswick along the southern boundary of the ZEC. Raymond Lake is the northernmost territory. ZEC is surrounded by municipalities in the Témiscouata Regional County Municipality.

Covering an area of 615 square kilometers, the ZEC Owen has 35 lakes with 32 available for recreational fishing. The territory includes 10 rivers (or river segments) including 9 operated for recreational fishing. The two main rivers are: Owen and Madawaska. The watershed of the Owen River drains about 50% of the territory. ZEC has several streams (or stream segment): Lizotte, Languedoc, the Birches, Iroquois, Plourde, Benedict, Horseback, Ritchie, Lajoie, Asselin and Morrison.

The territory of the ZEC comprises:

- Two rare forest ecosystems: Owen River (black Frênaie to American elm) and Madawaska River (white pine sugar maple);
- Old forest ecosystems Creek Baseley (Balsam fir-yellow birch) and Brook Teed (Sugar maple-yellow birch).

Located near the provincial border, Mount Benedict reaches 385 m. altitude. Both home Zec positions are located:

- Southern part of the ZEC: Baseley the Chalet, located at Lake Beazley; accessible by car Degelis.
- North of Zec: Lake Sugarloaf; accessible by car from the city Saint-Michel-du-Squatec.

== Hunting and fishing ==
In Zec, nature lovers have the opportunity to observe species such as: American black bear, deer, moose, fox, lynx, grouse, hare, fisher marten, weasel, squirrel, heron, bald eagle, red-tailed hawk, loon and beaver. Two nests of bald eagles have been listed. The heron is protected.

On the territory of the ZEC fishing quota are applicable for the following species: brook trout, lake trout, coregonus and perch. Fishing seasons and quotas allowed are listed on the website of the ZEC Owen: Official website. Given the abundance of wildlife in the ZEC, the following species are subject to quotas, according to particular periods, hunting gear and sex of animals (moose): moose, Virginia deer, american black bear, grouse and hare.

== Key attractions ==
Among the natural attractions of the ZEC, visitors can stop by the ZEC at:

- The "waterfalls Auclair stream". This stream has a tunnel near the outlet of Little Lake Auclair, near waterfalls;
- Falls Farley Creek
- The "Sugar Loaf Mountain"
- The "mountain of Grand Lajoie".

A walking trail on 4 km constructed by the ZEC provides access to the highest peak in the area. An archaeological site contains artifacts of Native American prehistory in that territory.

ZEC offers a hosting service at Baseley Chalet, located at the water's edge, one kilometer from the home and drive away Baseley post. Campers can also use campground at Camping Grand Benedict. Several boat ramps are provided on water lakes of the ZEC.

== Toponymy ==
The name "ZEC Owen" is derived from the name of the Owen River, which crosses its territory. The name "Zec Owen" was formalized on August 5, 1982, at the Bank of place names in the Commission de toponymie du Québec (Geographical Names Board of Quebec).

== See also ==
- Lejeune, municipality
- Témiscouata Regional County Municipality
- Bas-Saint-Laurent, an administrative region
- Lac-Témiscouata National Park
- Zone d'exploitation contrôlée (Controlled harvesting zone)
