= Zec Nordique =

- Location within Quebec
- Location: Canada, Quebec, Manicouagan Regional County Municipality
- Nearest city: Les Escoumins and Tadoussac
- Coordinates: 48°31′00″N 69°53′00″W
- Area: 458.3 square kilometres (177.0 sq mi)
- Established: 1978
- Governing body: Association de chasse et pêche Nordique inc.
- Website: zecnordique.reseauzec.com

The ZEC Nordique is a "zone d'exploitation contrôlée" (controlled harvesting zone) (ZEC) in the unorganized territory of the Lac-au-Brochet, in the Manicouagan Regional County Municipality (MRC), in the administrative region of Côte-Nord (North-Shore), in Quebec, in Canada.

The ZEC is administered by the Association de chasse et pêche Nordique inc (Association of Fishing and Hunting Nordic Inc) which is non-profit organization, incorporated on September 8, 1978. The head office is based in the municipality Les Escoumins.

== Geography ==
Zec Nordique covers an area of 458.3 square kilometers in the heart of the MRC La Haute-Côte-Nord Regional County Municipality (Upper North Shore). ZEC has a total of 150 km of motorable roads and 211 lakes, where a hundred followers practice sport fishing. Area of lakes varies from 2 to 390 hectares.

The boundaries of the Nordic ZEC are marked on:

- East, by the Escoumins River going down to the southeast to empty into the St. Lawrence River at the height of the municipality Les Escoumins. A forested road from the municipality Les Escoumins along this river to the "lac des Coeurs" (lake of Hearts). With a length of 34 km on the course of the river, the Zec Rivière-des-Escoumins was established in 1992. In addition, the Zec D'Iberville is close to the east;
- West, the southern part is related to the Zec Chauvin; the northern part of the western boundary is marked on the 11.7 km line between administrative regions Saguenay-Lac-Saint-Jean and Manicouagan.
- South, its southern end stops about 1 km north of the summit of Green Mountain (288 m.) and north of Lake Fountain.

Moreover, the territory of the ZEC has an extension to the east of the Escoumins River, covering in particular the "Lac de la Grand-Mère" (lake Grandmother), "À la Pipe" (in Pipe), Téton (Stud), Des Îles (The Islands), Jérôme et Gagné.

The major lakes of Zec are: Albert, Boucher, Bouliane, Brûlé, du Buccin (Whelk), Carré (Square), Chatignies, Claire, de la Corne (Horn), du Cornet, du Crachat (Spit), Edmond, des Dames (Ladies), en Delta, Petit lac Dorval, "Eaux Mortes à Luma" (Lac Lamarre), Gabou, du Gâchis (the Hash), Gagné, Gaston, Gausse, Gilles, Gorgotton, du Grand Nez (the Big Nose), Grand Jumeau (Big Twin), de la Grand-Mère (the Grandmother), aux Grenouilles (the Frogs), Ignace, des Îles (Islands), Italie, Jeanne, Jérôme, Jour, Karabi, Lina, Long, Louis, Maclure, Petit lac Maclure, Mado, Marennes, Montchenu, des Numéros, Oublié, Pamphile, Téton, du Pic, à la Pipe, Polette, Pointu, de Pons, Pourri, Rond, Sam, des Sapins (Firs), des Savanes, Petit lac des Savannes, du pointeur, Téton, Ti-Georges, Ti-Paul, Ti-Thomas, Ti-Tole, Tranquille, Travers, "à Viateur" and "des Vieux" (Old).

Road access to the ZEC is favored by the forest road along the Escoumins River, which is the eastern boundary of the ZEC. The eastern boundary of the ZEC is 25 km (in direct line) from the city center of Les Escoumins and 30 km (in a direct line) from downtown Tadoussac.

== Hunting and fishing ==
Besides camping, Nordic ZEC has four rustic campgrounds: des Trois-Portes (Three Doors), du Rapide-Blanc, and du Petit lac Maclure et du Lac Rond.

ZEC is a gamey Nordic territory. Species subject to quotas for hunting are the moose, black bear, grouse, grouse and hare. Quotas and conditions apply depending on the time of year, hunting or sex of moose.

Zec established a quota for fishing brook trout.

== Toponymy ==
The origin of the name is related to the fact that the ZEC is located in the region on the north bank of the Saguenay River and also St. Lawrence River, and the zec is part of the administrative region of Côte-Nord (North Shore). Certainly few other ZEC in Quebec are located further north than the ZEC Nordique

The name "Zec Nordique" was formalized on August 5, 1982, at the Bank of place names in the Commission de toponymie du Québec (Geographical Names Board of Quebec).

== See also ==
- Lac-au-Brochet, unorganized territory
- La Haute-Côte-Nord Regional County Municipality, (RCM)
- Côte-Nord (North Shore), administrative region of Quebec
- St. Lawrence River
- Zec D'Iberville
- Zec Chauvin
- Zone d'exploitation contrôlée (Controlled harvesting zone) (ZEC)
