= Zec Pontiac =

Controlled harvesting zone of Quebec (Canada)

- Location within Quebec
- Location: Canada, Quebec, La Vallée-de-la-Gatineau Regional County Municipality, Pontiac Regional County Municipality
- Coordinates: 46°27′00″N 76°35′00″W
- Area: 1,205 square kilometres (465 sq mi)
- Established: 1978
- Governing body: Association de la réserve Pontiac inc.

The ZEC Pontiac is a "zone d'exploitation contrôlée" (controlled harvesting zone) (ZEC) located in Pontiac Regional County Municipality, in the province of Quebec, in Canada.

The ZEC is managed by the "Association de la réserve Pontiac inc". The administrative office is located in Gracefield, Quebec. Rates vary depending on the activity and duration, and may be obtained through the office.

ZEC Pontiac is located in the Outaouais region in the western part of the province. It is mainly a hunting and fishing area with recreational tourism activities.

== Geography ==
The ZEC territory covers an area of 1205 km². It straddles the Pontiac Regional County Municipality and La Vallée-de-la-Gatineau Regional County Municipality.

== Hydrography ==
The territory of the ZEC contains 350 lakes for fishing brook trout, golden, trout and pike. Brodtkorb Lake is the busiest lake for speckled trout (brook trout) in the Outaouais region.

== Wildlife ==
Smaller wildlife species are abundant and include gray squirrels, raccoons, skunks, beaver, loons and many other birds. Hunting seasons in the ZEC vary according to hunting gear, sex of animals (moose) and quotas for the following species: moose, white-tailed deer, black bear, hare and grouse.

This ZEC restricts the use of gasoline engines on some lakes. Winter fishing is allowed on these lakes: McNally, Depot, Evan, Gloria, Herman, Leblanc and Trump (porcupine).

Quotas for fishing apply to the following species: brook trout, lake trout, pike, walleye and bass.

== Tourism ==
ZEC Pontiac offers various outdoor activities including mountain biking, cycling, canoeing, camping, hiking, hunting, and fishing. Lakes David and Pythonga offer beaches.

Gathering wild fruits (blueberries, raspberries and blackberries) is popular in July and August.

Several rustic or equipped campgrounds are available for rental in the ZEC, as well as individual cottages and shelters.

=== Related articles ===
- Gracefield, a municipality of Outaouais region
- Pontiac Regional County Municipality
- La Vallée-de-la-Gatineau Regional County Municipality
- Zone d'exploitation contrôlée (Controlled harvesting zone) (ZEC)

== Attachments ==
=== External links ===
- Official website of the ZEC Pontiac.
- ZEC Pontiac Tourist Info Main Page
