= Cascapédia–Saint-Jules =

- Municipality
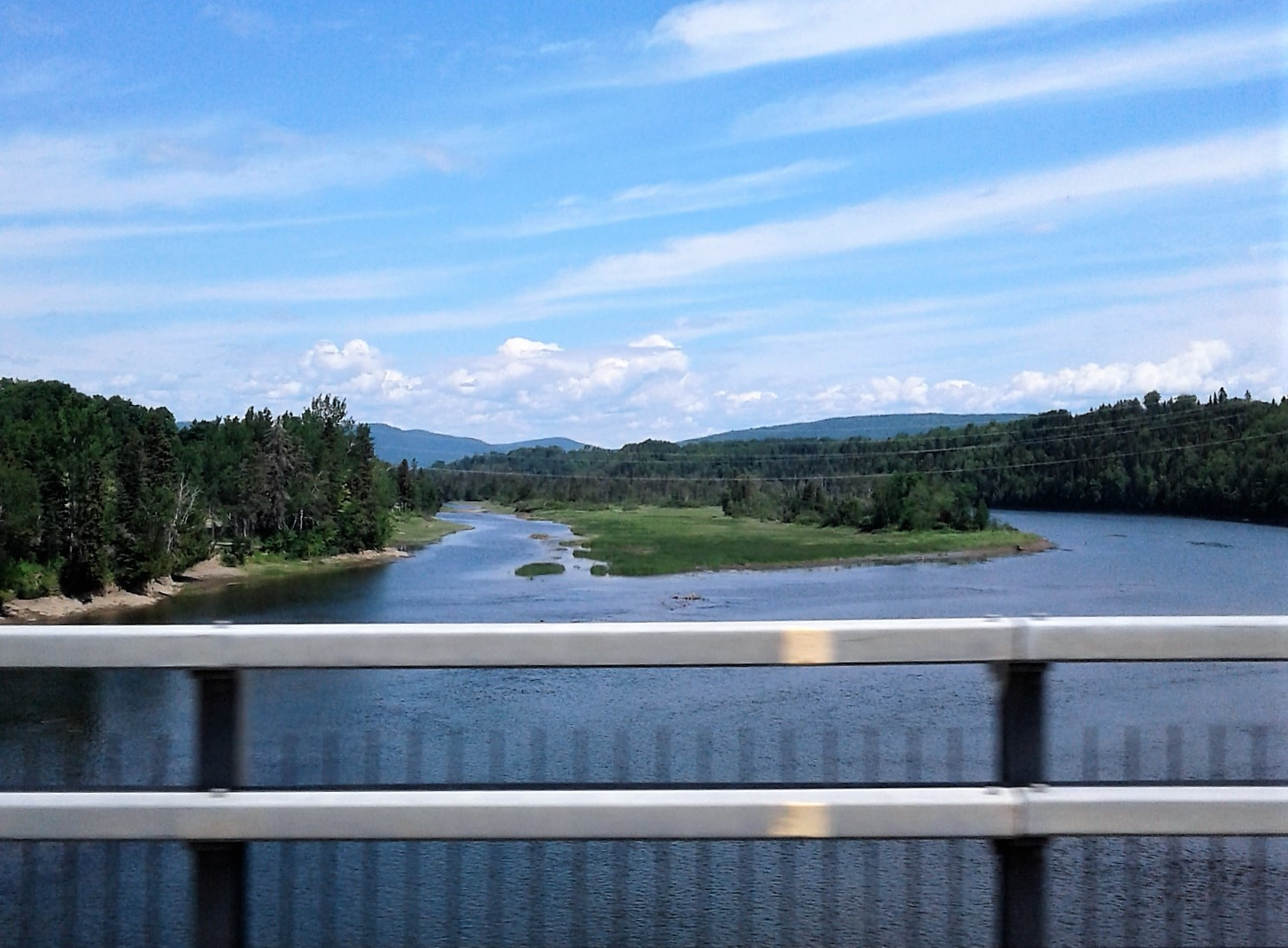
- Cascapedia River seen from Route 132 in Cascapédia–Saint-Jules in July 2018

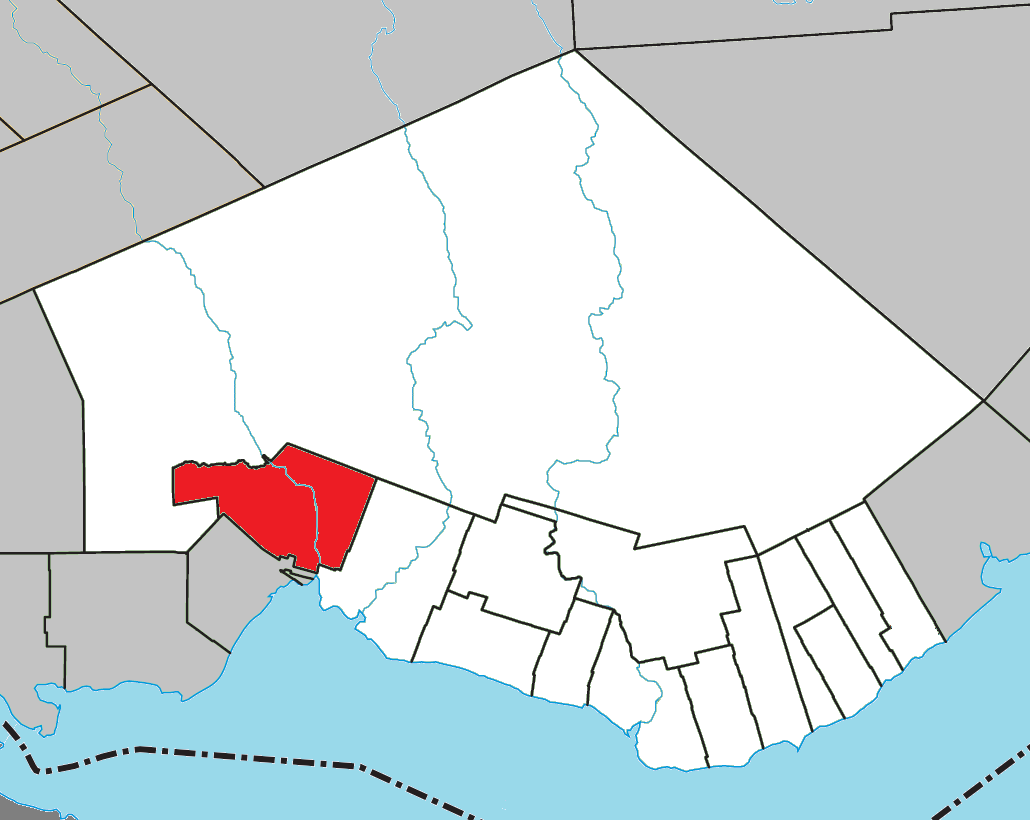
- Location within Bonaventure RCM

- Location in eastern Quebec
- Coordinates: 48°15′N 65°55′W
- Country: Canada
- Province: Quebec
- Region: Gaspésie– Îles-de-la-Madeleine
- RCM: Bonaventure
- Constituted: June 2, 1999

Government
  - Mayor: Ashley Milligan
  - Federal riding: Gaspésie—Les Îles-de-la-Madeleine—Listuguj
  - Prov. riding: Bonaventure

Area
  - Total: 163.03 km^{2} (62.95 sq mi)
  - Land: 164.29 km^{2} (63.43 sq mi)
- There is an apparent contradiction between two authoritative sources.

Population (2021)
  - Total: 764
  - Density: 4.7/km^{2} (12/sq mi)
  - Pop (2016-21): ▲4.7%
  - Dwellings: 385
- Time zone: UTC−5 (EST)
  - Summer (DST): UTC−4 (EDT)
- Postal code(s): G0C 1T0
- Area codes: 418 and 581
- Highways: R-132 R-299
- Website: cascapediastjules.com

Cascapédia–Saint-Jules is a municipality in Quebec, Canada.

The municipality includes the communities of Grande-Cascapédia and Saint-Jules, both located along the Cascapédia River.

== History ==
On June 2, 1999, the Municipalities of Grande-Cascapédia and Saint-Jules were merged to form the Municipality of Cascapédia. It was renamed to Cascapédia–Saint-Jules on June 26, 2000.

=== Grande-Cascapédia ===
Kigicapigiak had been a Mi'kmaq summer coastal community prior to European settlement. Grande-Cascapédia was formed in the mid 19th century. Named after the adjacent river, originally called Cascapédiac, this name is from the Mi'kmaq words kaska (broad) and pegiag (river). In 1860, the local parish was established that 3 years later counted some 1500 inhabitants, and in 1883, its post office opened. In 1929, the place was incorporated as a municipality. Another theory on the etymology is that it was named for the Mi'kmaq word kěskebeâk which means "wide paddle."

=== Saint-Jules ===
Saint-Jules was founded as a mission in 1899, and became a parish only 2 years later. It was named after Pope Julius I, and also called Saint-Jules-de-Maria (1922-1950) or Saint-Jules-de-Cascapédia to distinguish it from Saint-Jules in the Beauce region. Its post office opened in 1922. In 1949, the place was incorporated as a separate municipality out of the Township Municipality of Maria.

== Demographics ==
=== Population ===
Canada census – Cascapédia–Saint-Jules community profile

	2021	2016	2011
Population	764 (+4.7% from 2016)	730 (-1.5% from 2011)	741 (+3.8% from 2006)
Land area	164.29 km^{2} (63.43 sq mi)	163.45 km^{2} (63.11 sq mi)	162.61 km^{2} (62.78 sq mi)
Population density	4.7/km^{2} (12/sq mi)	4.5/km^{2} (12/sq mi)	4.6/km^{2} (12/sq mi)
Median age	46.8 (M: 45.2, F: 48.4)	47.6 (M: 46.2, F: 48.5)	46.5 (M: 46.9, F: 45.7)
Private dwellings	385 (total) 347 (occupied)	355 (total)	403 (total)
Median household income	$64,000	$54,784	$43,530

References: 2021 2016 2011

Historical Census Data - Cascapédia–Saint-Jules, Quebec
Year	Pop.	±%
2001	679	—
2006	714	+5.2%
2011	741	+3.8%
2016	730	−1.5%
2021	764	+4.7%
Source: Statistics Canada

=== Language ===
Mother tongue (2021):

- English only: 52.9%
- French only: 43.1%
- English and French: 3.3%
- Other language: 0.7%

== See also ==
- List of anglophone communities in Quebec
- List of municipalities in Quebec
