= Zec Chauvin =

- Location within Quebec
- Location: Le Fjord-du-Saguenay Regional County Municipality
- Nearest city: Saguenay (City)
- Coordinates: 48°26′00″N 70°05′00″W
- Area: 619 km
- Established: 1979

The ZEC Chauvin is a "zone d'exploitation contrôlée" (controlled harvesting zone) of 619 square kilometres (239 sq mi), located partly in the unorganized territory of the Mont-Valin, in Le Fjord-du-Saguenay Regional County Municipality, in the administrative region Saguenay-Lac-Saint-Jean, in Quebec, in Canada.

== Geography ==
The ZEC Chauvin which is covering 619 square kilometres (239 sq mi), is located on the northeast of the Saguenay River. It is bounded by rivers Sainte-Marguerite (on south), and Sainte-Marguerite Northeast (east and north). ZEC is located close to other ZEC Martin-Valin (west) and Nordic (east). At South of the territory, route 172 goes along the Sainte-Marguerite.

The ZEC has 249 lakes, 231 are used for fishing.

ZEC has 75 campsites in the cleared zone and equipped with dry toilets and sinks. These sites are designed for camping with trailer. The magnificent Lake Regis Falls worth a visit.

To get there, visitors travel the route 138 to Tadoussac. Five kilometers after the village of Tadoussac, take the route 172, in the village of Sacré-Coeur. On this road, the visitor takes the "chemin du moulin" (path of the mill) on the right and then the C900 road to the entrance station (located southeast of ZEC).

== Hunting and Fishing ==
The territory of the ZEC supports the observation of ducks, including withers Iceland whose species is considered a vulnerable birds of Eastern Canada. Females lay their eggs in cavities in large trees or in nest boxes installed by the Canadian Wildlife Service. Annually, females traveling with their brood of ducklings on the lakes of Zec in early July. As for fishing, the arctic knight, the brook trout and whitefish are subject to a contingency which is described on the website of the ZEC. As for recreative hunting, ZEC applies a contingency for moose, the black bear, the grouse and hare. These animals are usually abundant in the ZEC.

== Toponymy ==
The toponym "Chauvin" refers to a ZEC, a lake and a stream, located in the territory of the ZEC. The name of the ZEC recalls the merit of Pierre Chauvin, lord of Tonnetuit, born in Dieppe (Seine-Maritime) before 1575 and died in Honfleur in February 1603. He was a captain in the navy and the French Army, Lieutenant General of the New France. In 1600, he came to establish a fur trading post on the left bank of the mouth of the Saguenay River, in Tadoussac.

The name "ZEC Chauvin" was recorded on August 5, 1982, at the Bank of place names in the Commission de toponymie du Québec (Geographical Names Board of Quebec)

== See also ==
=== Related articles ===
- Mont-Valin, unorganized territory
- Le Fjord-du-Saguenay Regional County Municipality (RCM)
- Saguenay River
- Saguenay-Lac-Saint-Jean, administrative region in Quebec
- Zone d'exploitation contrôlée (Controlled harvesting zone) (zec)

== Attachments ==
=== External links ===
- Official website
