= Zec de la Maison-de-Pierre =

- Location within Quebec
- Location: Canada, Quebec, Antoine-Labelle Regional County Municipality
- Nearest city: Lac-Douaire, unorganized territory
- Coordinates: 46°49′01″N 74°51′06″W
- Area: 805.10 square kilometres (310.85 sq mi)
- Established: 1978

The Zec de la Maison-de-Pierre is a "zone d'exploitation contrôlée" (controlled harvesting zone) (ZEC), located in the municipality of L'Ascension and the unorganized territories of Lac-Douaire (south part), Baie-des-Chaloupes and Lac-de-la-Maison-de-Pierre, in the Antoine-Labelle Regional County Municipality, in the Laurentides region of Quebec, in Canada. This Zec of 800 square kilometres (310 sq mi) was created in 1978.

== Geography ==
The ZEC is adjacent to the Zec Mazana (north) and the Zec Boullé located in the extreme northeast (their common border is short) and the Mont-Tremblant National Park on the east side. The Rivière Rouge is the eastern boundary of the territory of the "Zec de la Maison-de-Pierre".

The area of the zec has 220 lakes, the most important are: Curières, de la Maison-de-Pierre (located at the center of the zec), Lanthier (on West) and Rupert. The other lakes are: À l'Aigle, Adèle, Adrien, Arden, Avon, Banane, Barrette, Beauchamp, Bessons, Bienvenue, Blais, Bonn, Brown, Bruce, Bruno, Buda, Caron, Cassidy, Charest, Charles, Chez-Nous, Chopin, Cinq-Mars, Clabo, Claude, Claudette, Clion, Clos, Conscrit, Corinne, Croche, Daughnut, De la Massue, Dollard, Dreux, Du Chantier, Dufort, Dufrost, Duhaime, Duret, Elgin, Elko, En Cœur, Faradon, Fillion, Foisy, Franchère, François, Fronde, Gaudet, Gilles, Gorion, Hackette, Hatchery, Horace, Inconnu, Jacques, Jean-Paul, Joanne, Joce (Boce), Jocelyne, John, Jules, Kalmar, Kalso, Keepover, Labrosse, Lac du Bouleau Blanc, Lacasse, Lépine, Linda, Lise, Loubias, Lulu, Macaouago, Marcelle, Marco, Marguerite, Médora, Mireille, Mondette, Nicole, Nipper, Offset, Ouimet, Paul, Pegaud, Perrier, Petit-lac de la Maison de Pierre, Petits lacs Verts, Racicot, Raymond, Robertson, Russell, Saint-Laurent, Saul, Séré, Sonoma, Sunset, Tebana, Tern, Thérèse, Trego, Tremblant, Trinité, Vase, Watson and Yvan.

The first entrance station of Zec is located near Lake Russel (south-west of the zec) and the second is located near Lake Curières (south).

== Protection of Land ==
"Zec de la Maison-de-Pierre" is not a protected area recognized by the Government of Quebec, like all other ZECs, because forestry and mining are allowed.

== Hunting and Fishing ==
On the territory of the ZEC, hunting is restricted according to the periods, the types of hunting gear, sex beasts (moose), for the following species: moose, black bear, grouse and hare.

Fishing quotas are applicable in the zec for brook trout, lake trout, pike and walleye.
