= Zec de la Rivière-des-Escoumins =

- Location within Quebec
- Location: Canada, Quebec, La Haute-Côte-Nord Regional County Municipality
- Nearest city: Les Escoumins
- Coordinates: 48°20′50″N 69°27′00″W
- Established: 1992

The ZEC de la Rivière-des-Escoumins is a "zone d'exploitation contrôlée" (controlled harvesting zone) (zec) in the municipality of Les Escoumins, in La Haute-Côte-Nord Regional County Municipality, administrative region of Côte-Nord (North Shore), in Quebec, in Canada.

== Geography ==
"Zec de la Rivière-des-Escoumins" administers a segment 34 kilometres (21 mi) on Escoumins River for recreative fishing. River Escoumins flows from north to southeast and reaches its annual rate of 13 up to 20 m^{3}/s (460–710 cu ft/s) in July.

A forest road along the river, facilitates access to salmon pits upstream the river.

Since 2014, salmon can swim upstream beyond the "chute du Grand-Sault" (Falls of the Grand Sault), passing through a fishway, allowing them to go up to the upper part of the river.

== Fishing ==
In the zec of Rivière-des-Escoumins, fishing is practiced by wading. In general, the salmon pits are quite long and shallow. Zec is divided into four sectors, three are quotas. A total of 66 pits were listed in the zec.

== Attachments ==
=== Related articles ===
- Escoumins River
- La Haute-Côte-Nord Regional County Municipality
- Zone d'exploitation contrôlée (controlled harvesting zone) (zec)

=== External links ===
- Official website of "Zec de la Rivière-des-Escoumins"
- "Zec de la Rivière-des-Escoumins" on the site of the Commission de toponymie du Québec (Geographical Names Board of Quebec)
