= Rivière-Saint-Jean, Gaspésie–Îles-de-la-Madeleine, Quebec =

Rivière-Saint-Jean
- Unorganized territory
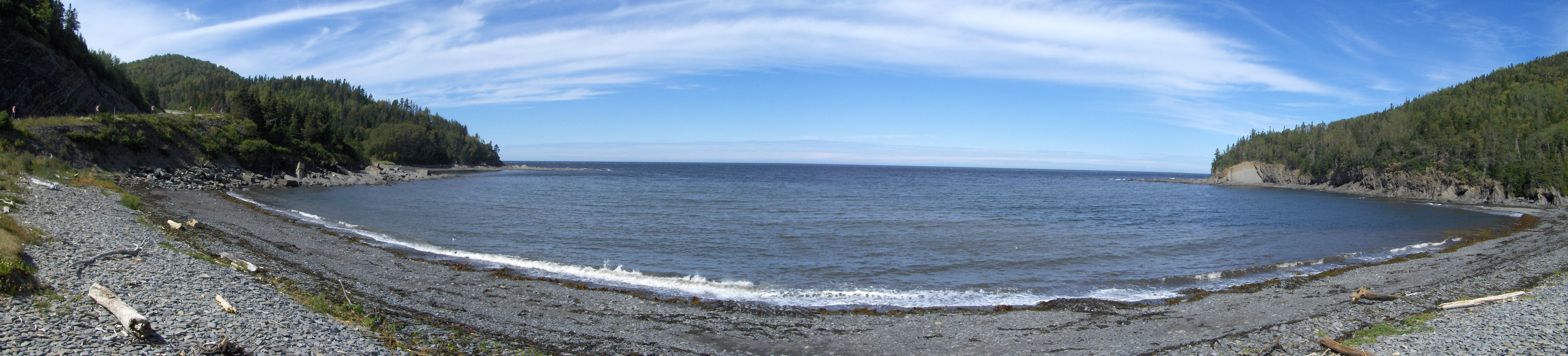
- Anse de l'Étang

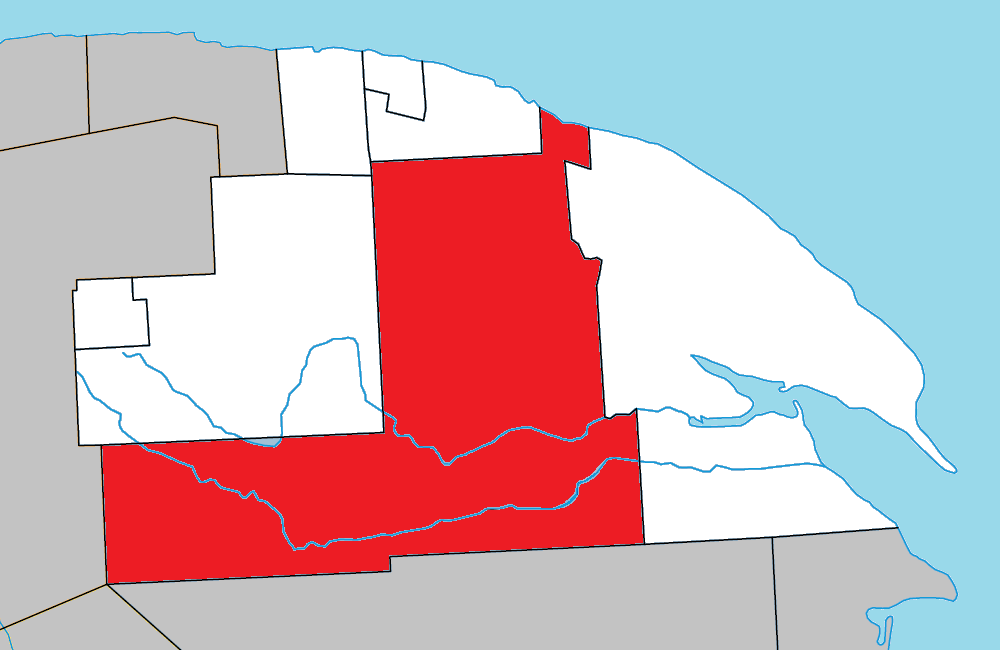
- Location within La Côte-de-Gaspé RCM

- Location in eastern Quebec
- Coordinates: 48°50′N 64°55′W
- Country: Canada
- Province: Quebec
- Region: Gaspésie–Îles-de-la-Madeleine
- RCM: La Côte-de-Gaspé
- Constituted: January 1, 1986

Government
  - Federal riding: Gaspésie—Les Îles-de-la-Madeleine—Listuguj
  - Prov. riding: Gaspé

Area
  - Total: 1,756.21 km^{2} (678.08 sq mi)
  - Land: 1,748.14 km^{2} (674.96 sq mi)

Population (2021)
  - Total: 0
  - Density: 0/km^{2} (0/sq mi)
  - Pop (2016-21): 0.0%
  - Dwellings: 3
- Time zone: UTC-5 (EST)
  - Summer (DST): UTC-4 (EDT)
- Highways: R-132 R-198

Rivière-Saint-Jean (French pronunciation: [ʁivjɛʁ sɛ̃ ʒɑ̃], "St. John River") is an unorganized territory in the Gaspésie–Îles-de-la-Madeleine region of Quebec, Canada. It is bisected by Quebec Route 198 that runs along the banks of the York River.

The territory is named after the Saint-Jean River that is considered one of the best salmon rivers in Quebec. This 90 kilometres (56 mi) long river has its source in the Chic-Choc Mountains, about 5 kilometres (3.1 mi) south of Murdochville, and runs in a south-east direction for the first 35 kilometres (22 mi), then east to the Bay of Gaspé. Portions of the river are protected in the Rivière-Saint-Jean Wildlife Reserve.

The only locality in the territory is Grand-Étang, located along Route 132 at the namesake Grand Étang (French for "Great Pond").

== Demographics ==
=== Population ===
Historical Census Data - Rivière-Saint-Jean, Gaspésie–Îles-de-la-Madeleine, Quebec
Year	Pop.	±%
1991	0	—
1996	0	0.00%
2001	0	0.00%
2006	0	0.00%
2011	0	0.00%
2026	0	0.00%
2021	0	0.00%
Source: Statistics Canada

== See also ==
- List of unorganized territories in Quebec
