= La Côte-de-Gaspé Regional County Municipality =

La Côte-de-Gaspé
- Regional county municipality
- Coordinates: 49°10′N 64°55′W
- Country: Canada
- Province: Quebec
- Region: Gaspésie–Îles-de-la-Madeleine
- Effective: January 1, 1982
- County seat: Gaspé

Government
  - Type: Prefecture
  - Prefect: François Roussy

Area
  - Total: 4,347.89 km^{2} (1,678.73 sq mi)
  - Land: 4,088.39 km^{2} (1,578.54 sq mi)

Population (2021)
  - Total: 17,547
  - Density: 4.3/km^{2} (11/sq mi)
  - Change (2016-21): ▲2.5%
- Time zone: UTC−5 (EST)
  - Summer (DST): UTC−4 (EDT)
- Area codes: 418 and 581
- Website: www.cotedegaspe.ca

La Côte-de-Gaspé (French pronunciation: [la kot də ɡaspe]) is a regional county municipality on the Gaspé peninsula in eastern Quebec, Canada, part of the Gaspésie–Îles-de-la-Madeleine region. The seat is Gaspé.

The regional county has a land area of 4,098.80 square kilometres (1,582.56 sq mi) and its population was 17,547 inhabitants as of the 2021 Census. Its largest community is the city of Gaspé.

== Subdivisions ==
There are 7 subdivisions within the RCM:

Cities & Towns (2)

- Gaspé
- Murdochville

Municipalities (2)

- Grande-Vallée
- Petite-Vallée

Townships (1)

- Cloridorme

Unorganized Territory (2)

- Collines-du-Basque
- Rivière-Saint-Jean

Native reserves (1)
(not associated with RCM)

- Gespeg

== Demographics ==
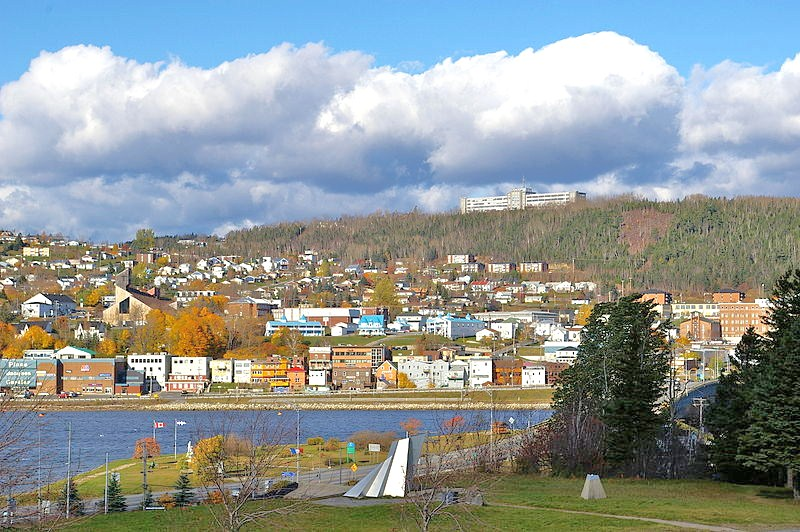
Gaspé

=== Population ===
Canada census – La Côte-de-Gaspé community profile

	2021	2016	2011
Population	17,547 (+2.5% from 2016)	17,117 (-4.8% from 2011)	17,985 (+0.5% from 2006)
Land area	4,088.39 km^{2} (1,578.54 sq mi)	4,098.80 km^{2} (1,582.56 sq mi)	4,097.66 km^{2} (1,582.12 sq mi)
Population density	4.3/km^{2} (11/sq mi)	4.2/km^{2} (11/sq mi)	4.4/km^{2} (11/sq mi)
Median age	52.0 (M: 51.2, F: 52.4)	51.1 (M: 50.5, F: 51.6)	48.4 (M: 47.9, F: 48.9)
Private dwellings	8,906 (total) 8,034 (occupied)	8,648 (total)	8,486 (total)
Median household income	$69,500	$57,676	$50,936

References: 2021 2016 2011

Historical Census Data - La Côte-de-Gaspé Regional County Municipality, Quebec

Year	Pop.	±%
1991	20,903	—
1996	20,851	−0.2%
2001	18,545	−11.1%
2006	17,888	−3.5%

Year	Pop.	±%
2011	17,985	+0.5%
2016	17,117	−4.8%
2021	17,547	+2.5%

=== Language ===
Canada Census Mother Tongue - La Côte-de-Gaspé Regional County Municipality, Quebec
Census	Total	French			English			French & English			Other		
Year	Responses	Count	Trend	Pop %	Count	Trend	Pop %	Count	Trend	Pop %	Count	Trend	Pop %
2016	16,855	14,965	▼5.6%	88.8%	1,600	▼7.8%	9.5%	185	▲5.7%	1.1%	105	▲75.0%	0.6%
2011	17,830	15,860	▲3.0%	88.95%	1,735	▼9.6%	9.73%	175	▲59.1%	0.98%	60	▼71.4%	0.34%
2006	17,635	15,395	▼5.2%	87.30%	1,920	▲4.1%	10.89%	110	▼18.5%	0.62%	210	▲281.8%	1.19%
2001	18,275	16,240	▼9.6%	88.86%	1,845	▼22.0%	10.10%	135	▼37.2%	0.74%	55	▲10.0%	0.30%
1996	20,585	17,955	n/a	87.22%	2,365	n/a	11.49%	215	n/a	1.04%	50	n/a	0.24%

== Transportation ==
=== Access Routes ===
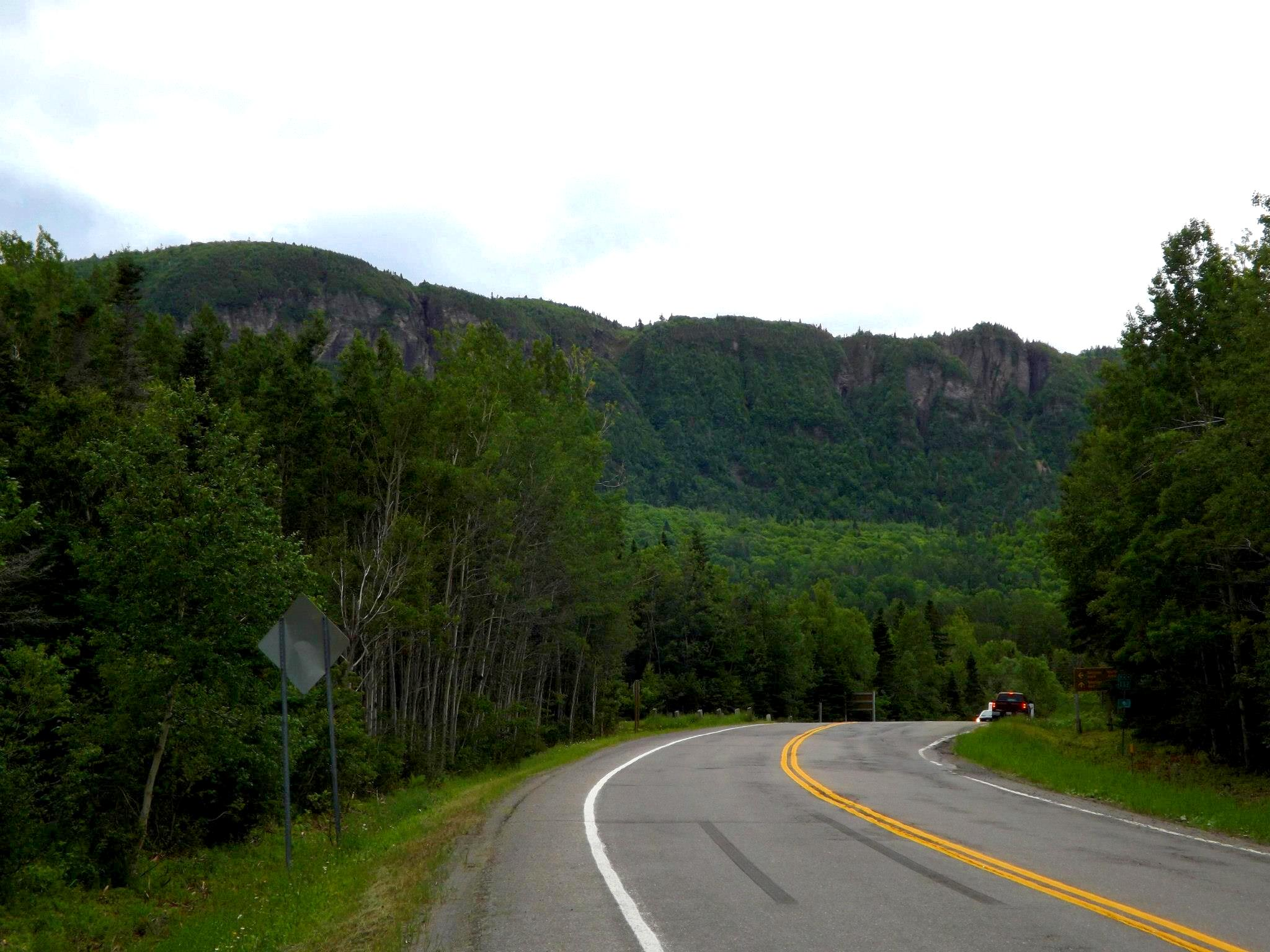
Quebec Route 132 in Forillon National Park

Highways and numbered routes that run through the municipality, including external routes that start or finish at the county border:

- Autoroutes
  - None
- Principal Highways
  - R-132
  - R-197
  - R-198
- Secondary Highways
  - None
- External Routes
  - None

== See also ==
- List of regional county municipalities and equivalent territories in Quebec
