= Zec Martin-Valin =

- Location within Quebec
- Location: Canada, Quebec, Le Fjord-du-Saguenay Regional County Municipality
- Nearest city: Saint-Fulgence
- Coordinates: 48°40′00″N 70°37′00″W
- Area: 1200
- Established: 1978
- Governing body: Association de chasse et de pêche Martin-Pêcheur

The Zec Martin-Valin is a "zone d'exploitation contrôlée" (controlled harvesting zone) (ZEC), located in the Le Fjord-du-Saguenay Regional County Municipality, in administrative region of Saguenay-Lac-Saint-Jean, in Quebec, in Canada.

Created in 1978 by the Government of Quebec and established in 1979, Zec Martin-Valin is administered by the "Association de chasse et de pêche Martin-Pêcheur inc" which ensures its development and growth. The 63 Zec Quebec are areas of public property belonging to the provincial government.

== Geography ==
This territory dedicated to recrotouristic activities (camping, canoe camping, kayaking, hunting and fishing) covers 1,200 square kilometres (460 sq mi) in the administrative region of Saguenay-Lac-Saint-Jean. The zec is located on public land northeast of the Monts-Valin National Park. ZEC has 650 lakes and many rivers in the boreal forest area.

The territory of the zec is divided between the parish of Sainte-Rose-du-Nord located on the north coast of Saguenay River and Lake Poulin Courval, located about 45 km further north.

The reception office of the Zec Martin-Valin is located near the route 172 that connects the city of Saguenay to Tadoussac.

== Camping canoes ==
For a decade, the ZEC has five marked trails for canoe camping expeditions for 3 to 7 days. These expeditions in the northwestern part of the area include various portage trails and numerous lakes to cross. These circuits maintained by ZEC are beginner to advanced intermediate level. The circuits have multiple platforms for tents and toilets (on some sites). Amateur canoe-camping must register at the entrance station of the zec. Then they have to take forest roads on forty kilometers to reach the site of departures circuits in the North section of the Zec. A shuttle service offered by the ZEC is available, as well as canoe rentals.

== Hunting and fishing ==
Fishing

Fishing for native brook fountains (brook trout) is offered on three rivers and over 450 lakes in the ZEC. ZEC has made it easy access to the majority of water bodies in its territory by building parking lots and docks. ZEC permits the use of gasoline engines to power boats. ZEC offers a rental service on some boats fishing lakes.

Hunting

On the Zec Martin-Valin, hunting is regulated by the "Ministry of Sustainable Development, environment, wildlife and Parks". Hunters must comply with hunting quotas to the moose to bear and small wild animal (e.g. grouse, spruce grouse and gray partridge). Hunters can hunt big animal, if they become a member of the zec and holding a season pass to hunt big wild animal or the bear.

== Toponymy ==
Each of the two components of the name "Martin-Valin" has a distinctive origin:

- "Association de chasse et de pêche Martin-Pêcheur inc" which administers the ZEC;
- Three names using the name "Valin" the river which originates in the territory of the ZEC, the massive and mountain; they stand at the western edge of Zec

The name "Zec Martin-Valin" was formalized on December 5, 1982 at the Bank of place names in the Commission de toponymie du Québec (Geographical Names Board of Quebec).

== See also ==
=== Related articles ===
- Le Fjord-du-Saguenay Regional County Municipality
- Saguenay-Lac-Saint-Jean, administrative region of Quebec
- Monts-Valin National Park
- Zone d'exploitation contrôlée (Controlled Harvesting Zone) (MRC)

=== External links ===
- Official site of Zec Martin-Valin
