= Franquelin =

Franquelin may refer to:

== Surname ==
- Jean-Augustin Franquelin (1798–1839), French painter
- Jean-Baptiste-Louis Franquelin (1650–1712), French cartographer and hydrographer

== Toponyms ==
- Franquelin, Quebec, a municipality in Manicouagan Regional County Municipality, Côte-Nord, Quebec, Canada
- Franquelin River, Franquelin, Quebec, Canada
- Rivière Franquelin Branche Ouest, Franquelin, Quebec, Canada
- Franquelin Lake, Rivière-aux-Outardes, Quebec, Canada

== See also ==
- Franklin (disambiguation)
