= Lac Brisson (Rivière-aux-Outardes) =

Lake in Rivière-aux-Outardes, Côte-Nord, Quebec, Canada

Coordinates: 49°27′43″N 68°17′35″W

Lake Brisson
- Location within Quebec Location within Canada
- Location: Rivière-aux-Outardes, Manicouagan Regional County Municipality, Côte-Nord, Quebec, Canada
- Primary inflows: (clockwise from the mouth) Discharge from a lake (coming from the northeast), Brisson River (discharge from Lac Philippe), discharge from a set of lakes (coming from the southwest).
- Primary outflows: Brisson River
- Basin countries: Canada
- Max. length: 2.4 kilometres (1.5 mi)
- Max. width: 0.85 kilometres (0.53 mi)
- Surface elevation: 304 metres (997 ft)
- Islands: 3

The lac Brisson is a freshwater body of the watershed of the Brisson River, located in the unorganized territory of Rivière-aux-Outardes, in the Manicouagan Regional County Municipality, in the administrative region of Côte-Nord, in the province of Quebec, in Canada.

The east side of Lac Brisson is served by a forest road connecting to the southwest with a network of forest roads. On the east side the path to the English river allows road access from the southeast.

Forestry is the main economic activity around the lake.

== Geography ==
Lac Brisson is located in the southern part of the unorganized territory of Rivière-aux-Outardes. This slightly misshapen fish-shaped lake, the tail of which faces north, towards the mouth. It has a length of 2.4 km (1.5 mi), a maximum width of 0.85 km (0.53 mi) and an altitude of 304 m (997 ft). It has three small islands.

From the mouth of Lac Brisson, the current descends on 6.5 km (4.0 mi) following the course of the Brisson River, then the course of the rivière aux Anglais on 38.1 km (23.7 mi), in particular by crossing the Inconnu lake and the lac de la Rivière aux Anglais, to go to flow on the west bank of the Baie aux Anglais, on the north shore of the Estuary of Saint Lawrence.

== Toponym ==
The toponym "Lac Brisson" derives from the name of the river of the same name.

The toponym "Lac Brisson" was formalized on December 5, 1968 at the Place Names Bank of the Commission de toponymie du Québec.

== See also ==
- Gulf of St. Lawrence
- List of rivers of Quebec
