= Ma Tante River =

Location
- Country: Canada
- Province: Quebec
- Region: Côte-Nord
- MRC: Manicouagan Regional County Municipality
- Unorganized territory and municipality: Rivière-aux-Outardes, Franquelin

Physical characteristics
- Source: Ma Tante Lake
  - location: Franquelin
  - coordinates: 49°24′51″N 67°48′19″W
  - elevation: 197 m (646 ft)
- Mouth: Rivière aux Anglais
  - location: Franquelin
  - coordinates: 49°23′42″N 67°50′17″W
  - elevation: 151 m (495 ft)
- Length: 5.4 km (3.4 mi)

Basin features
- Tributaries
  - left: (upstream) discharge from some lakes including Gauthier, Norman and Surligne.
  - right: (upstream) discharge from a lake, stream.

The Ma Tante River is a tributary of the Franquelin River, flowing in the township of Franquelin, in the municipality of Franquelin, in the Manicouagan Regional County Municipality, in the administrative region of Côte-Nord, in the province of Quebec, in Canada.

Forestry is the main economic activity in this valley; recreational tourism, second.

The surface of this Middle North Shore river is usually frozen from the beginning of November to the end of April, except the rapids; however, safe circulation on the ice is generally from late November to early April.

== Geography ==
The Ma Tante river takes its source from "Ma Tante lake" (length: 1.5 km (0.93 mi); altitude: 197 m (646 ft)) located in the municipality of Franquelin. This mouth is located at 3.1 km (1.9 mi) northeast of the mouth of the Ma Tante River.

From its source, the Ma Tante river flows over 5.4 km (3.4 mi) with a drop of 46 m (151 ft), in the forest zone, according to the following segments:

- 0.6 km (0.37 mi) first towards the east crossing a little lake (altitude: 197 m (646 ft)) on 0.4 km (0.25 mi); by collecting the discharge of two lakes including Lac à Duncan, then towards the south, until the discharge of a stream (coming from the northwest);
- 1.9 km (1.2 mi) to the south in a slightly deep valley, to the outlet (coming from the east) of three lakes including Lac Gauthier;
- 2.5 km (1.6 mi) first towards the west up to a river elbow corresponding to the discharge of a stream (coming from north), toward south by crossing a small area of marshland, then towards the southwest by crossing a small lake, to its mouth.

The Ma Tante river flows into a bend on the east bank of the Franquelin river. This confluence is located at:

- 12.2 km (7.6 mi) north of the mouth of the Franquelin River;
- 19.4 km (12.1 mi) west of the village center of Godbout;
- 37.9 km (23.5 mi) north-east of downtown Baie-Comeau.

From the mouth of the Ma Tante river, the current descends on 24.8 km (15.4 mi) the course of the Franquelin river to the north shore of the estuary of Saint Lawrence.

== Toponymy ==
The acronym "rivière Ma Tante" was attributed to this watercourse in association with the acronym "rivière Mon Oncle" (watercourse located further east) evoking Raymond Côté's uncle, a worker forest. The toponym "Ma Tante River" appears on a 1933 map of the Ontario Paper Company.

The toponym "Ma Tante river" was formalized on August 2, 1974, at the Place Names Bank of the Commission de toponymie du Québec.

== See also ==
- Gulf of St. Lawrence
- List of rivers of Quebec
