= Lessard River (rivière Franquelin Branche Ouest) =

Location
- Country: Canada
- Province: Quebec
- Region: Côte-Nord
- MRC: Manicouagan Regional County Municipality
- Unorganized territory: Rivière-aux-Outardes

Physical characteristics
- Source: Little unidentified lake
  - location: Rivière-aux-Outardes
  - coordinates: 49°21′37″N 67°55′06″W
  - elevation: 176 m (577 ft)
- Mouth: Rivière Franquelin Branche Ouest
  - location: Rivière-aux-Outardes
  - coordinates: 49°22′08″N 67°52′16″W
  - elevation: 100 m (330 ft)
- Length: 5.8 km (3.6 mi)

Basin features
- River system: Rivière Franquelin Branche Ouest, Franquelin River, Gulf of St. Lawrence
- Tributaries
  - left: (upstream) discharge from a small lake.
  - right: (upstream) outlet of Lake Lessard.

The Lessard River is a tributary of the rivière Franquelin Branche Ouest, flowing in the unorganized territory of Rivière-aux-Outardes, in the Manicouagan Regional County Municipality, in the administrative region of Côte-Nord, in the province of Quebec, in Canada.

Forestry is the main economic activity in this valley; recreational tourism activities, second.

The surface of the Lessard River is usually frozen from the beginning of November to the end of April, except the rapids areas; however, safe circulation on the ice is generally from late November to early April.

== Geography ==
The Lessard River draws its source from a small lake (length: 0.4 km (0.25 mi); altitude: 176 m (577 ft)) located in the unorganized territory of Rivière-aux-Outardes. This mouth is located at:

- 7.7 km (4.8 mi) north-west of the village center of Franquelin;
- 5.4 km (3.4 mi) south-west of the mouth of the Franquelin river West branch.

From its source, the Lessard River flows over 5.8 km (3.6 mi) with a drop of 76 m (249 ft), especially in forest areas, according to the following segments:

- 1.2 km (0.75 mi) north across Lake Castonguay (length: 1.0 km (0.62 mi); altitude: 164 m (538 ft)), to its mouth;
- 1.0 km (0.62 mi) towards the north by crossing on 0.3 km (0.19 mi) Lac Bezeau (length: 0.5 km (0.31 mi); altitude: 155 m (509 ft)), until its mouth;
- 1.3 km (0.81 mi) towards the east by forming a loop towards the north, until the outlet (coming from the south) of Lake Lessard;
- 2.3 km (1.4 mi) eastward in a relatively straight line, collecting a stream (coming from the northwest), to its mouth.

The Lessard river flows on the southwest bank of the rivière Franquelin Branche Ouest. This confluence is located southeast of Lac à l'Oignon, either:

- 2.4 km (1.5 mi) west of the mouth of the rivière Franquelin Branche Ouest;
- 8.8 km (5.5 mi) north of the mouth of the Franquelin River;
- 20.6 km (12.8 mi) west of the village center of Godbout;
- 34.2 km (21.3 mi) north-east of downtown Baie-Comeau.

From the mouth of the Lessard river, the current descends on 4.3 km (2.7 mi) the course of the rivière Franquelin Branche Ouest, then on 19.0 km (11.8 mi) the course of the Franquelin river to the north shore of the estuary of Saint Lawrence.

== Toponymy ==
The term "Lessard" is a family name of French origin.

The toponym "Lessard River" was formalized on December 5, 1968, at the Place Names Bank of the Commission de toponymie du Québec.

== See also ==
- Gulf of St. Lawrence
- List of rivers of Quebec
