= Tremblay River =

Location
- Country: Canada
- Province: Quebec
- Region: Côte-Nord
- MRC: Manicouagan Regional County Municipality
- Unorganized territory: Rivière-aux-Outardes

Physical characteristics
- Source: Alex lake
  - location: Rivière-aux-Outardes
  - coordinates: 49°29′08″N 68°12′45″W
  - elevation: 350 m (1,150 ft)
- Mouth: Rivière aux Anglais
  - location: Rivière-aux-Outardes
  - coordinates: 49°26′24″N 68°14′22″W
  - elevation: 204 m (669 ft)
- Length: 8.9 km (5.5 mi)

Basin features
- Progression: Rivière aux Anglais, Baie des Anglais
- Tributaries
  - left: (upstream) Lac Tremblay outlet, outlet of a set of lakes including Len Lake.
  - right: (upstream)

The Tremblay river is a tributary of the rivière aux Anglais flowing in the unorganized territory Rivière-aux-Outardes, in the Manicouagan Regional County Municipality, in the administrative region of Côte-Nord, in the province of Quebec, in Canada.

The Tremblay river valley is mainly served by the English river path.

The surface of the Tremblay River is generally frozen from the beginning of December to the end of March, except the rapids areas; however, safe circulation on the ice is generally from mid-December to mid-March.

== Geography ==
The Tremblay River rises on the Canadian Shield, at Lac Alex (length: 0.4 km (0.25 mi); altitude: 350 m (1,150 ft)). This eastern forest lake has two outlets: that of the north (at the bottom of a bay) turns out to be the beginning of a stream leading north to the Françoise River; that of the south (at the bottom of a bay) turns out to be the head of the Tremblay river. The southern mouth of Lac Alex is located 5.4 km (3.4 mi) north of the confluence of the Tremblay and English rivers, 5.3 km (3.3 mi) northwest of head lake of the Mistassini River and 26.1 km (16.2 mi) north-west of the confluence of the rivière aux Anglais and the Baie des Anglais on the north shore of the Gulf of St. Lawrence.

From Lac Alex, the course of the Tremblay river descends on 8.9 km (5.5 mi) entirely in the forest zone, with a drop of 146 m (479 ft), according to the following segments:

- 2.1 km (1.3 mi) to the south by first crossing Lake François (length: 0.6 km (0.37 mi); altitude: 334 m (1,096 ft)) on 0.3 km (0.19 mi), to its mouth; then crossing Cousin Lake (length: 1.1 km (0.68 mi) in T shape; altitude: 334 m (1,096 ft)) over its full length, to its mouth;
- 1.8 km (1.1 mi) first east, then south, crossing Shaw Lake (length: 1.7 km (1.1 mi) S-shaped; altitude: 334 m (1,096 ft)) over its full length to its mouth;
- 2.3 km (1.4 mi) first towards the southwest in the marsh area, crossing a small lake; then southeasterly in marsh areas, and crossing a small lake in mid-segment, to the outlet (coming from the east) of Tremblay lake;
- 1.7 km (1.1 mi) to the south first in the marsh area, then crossing an unidentified lake (length: 0.6 km (0.37 mi); altitude: 258 m (846 ft)), until its mouth;
- 1.0 km (0.62 mi) first towards the south crossing Euclid Lake (length: 1.2 km (0.75 mi); altitude: 258 m (846 ft)), where the current curve west after having skirted a peninsula, to its mouth located at the bottom of a bay in the southwest. Note: Lake Euclid looks like has four peninsulas which approach towards the center as if to form a misshapen star;
- 0.7 km (0.43 mi) north-west down the mountain, to its mouth.

The Tremblay River flows into a bend on the south bank of the intermediate course of the English River, in the unorganized territory of Rivière-aux-Outardes. This confluence is located upstream of a zone of rapids, 0.17 km (0.11 mi) upstream of the confluence of the Brisson River. From the confluence of the Tremblay river, the current descends the course of the rivière aux Anglais for 40.3 km (25.0 mi) to the Baie des Anglais.

== Toponym ==
The term "Tremblay" is a family name of French origin.

The toponym "Tremblay River" was formalized on August 2, 1974, at the Place Names Bank of the Commission de toponymie du Québec.

== See also ==
- List of rivers of Quebec
