= Rivière des Trois Pointes =

Location
- Country: Canada
- Province: Quebec
- Region: Côte-Nord
- MRC: Manicouagan Regional County Municipality
- Unorganized territory: Rivière-aux-Outardes

Physical characteristics
- Source: Marois lake
  - location: Rivière-aux-Outardes
  - coordinates: 49°25′23″N 68°12′17″W
  - elevation: 258 m (846 ft)
- Mouth: Rivière aux Anglais
  - location: Rivière-aux-Outardes
  - coordinates: 49°30′35″N 68°14′07″W
  - elevation: 63 m (207 ft)
- Length: 11.9 km (7.4 mi)

Basin features
- Progression: Rivière aux Anglais, Baie des Anglais
- Tributaries
  - left: (upstream) discharge from a stream (via Lac des Trois Pointes), discharge from a lake, discharge from Lac du Serpent, two discharge from lakes (via Lake Picard), discharge from Lake Pat (via Lake Picard), discharge from Ladoga lake.
  - right: (upstream) discharge from a stream (via Lac des Trois Pointes), discharge from a set of lakes (via Lac des Chutes), discharge from two lakes.

The Rivière des Trois Pointes is a tributary of the rivière aux Anglais flowing in the unorganized territory Rivière-aux-Outardes, in the Manicouagan Regional County Municipality, in the administrative region of Côte-Nord, in the province of Quebec, in Canada.

The Trois Pointes river valley is mainly served by the English river path.

The surface of the Trois Pointes river is generally frozen from the beginning of December to the end of March, except the rapids areas; however, safe circulation on the ice is generally from mid-December to mid-March.

== Geography ==
The Trois Pointes river originates on the Canadian Shield, at a small unidentified lake (length: 0.24 km (0.15 mi); altitude: 441 m (1,447 ft)). The mouth (south side) of this small forest lake is located 9.0 km (5.6 mi) northeast of the confluence of the Françoise river and the rivière aux Anglais, at 0.8 km (0.50 mi) south-west of a bay in Lake Franquelin and 35.2 km (21.9 mi) north-west of the confluence of the rivière aux Anglais and Baie des Anglais on the north shore of the Gulf of St. Lawrence.

From the head lake, the course of the Trois Pointes river descends on 11.9 km (7.4 mi) entirely in the forest zone, with a drop of 195 m (640 ft), according to the following segments:

- 2.6 km (1.6 mi) east on 1.0 km (0.62 mi) in particular by crossing a lake formed by the widening of the river, until its mouth; then on 1.6 km (0.99 mi) south-east, to a bend corresponding to the outlet (coming from the west) of two lakes;
- 3.9 km (2.4 mi) southeasterly in a straight line, crossing Lake Picard (length: 1.9 km (1.2 mi); altitude: 197 m (646 ft)) on its full length, to its mouth;
- 2.4 km (1.5 mi) first towards the south-east in a deep valley to the outlet (coming from the north) of Lac du Serpent; then towards the south relatively in a straight line, crossing for a hundred meters a small bay of Lac des Chutes (length: 0.7 km (0.43 mi); altitude: 161 m (528 ft)), until at its mouth;
- 3.0 km (1.9 mi) to the south by rolling down the mountain to a bend in the river, branching east by collecting a stream (coming from the north), in particular by crossing on 0.8 km (0.50 mi) to the south-east the Lac des Trois Pointes (length: 1.3 km (0.81 mi); altitude: 71 m (233 ft)), to its mouth.

The Trois Pointes river flows on the north bank of the Lac La Chesnaye, which is crossed to the northeast by the current of the rivière aux Anglais, in the unorganized territory of Rivière-aux-Outardes. This confluence is located 2.6 km (1.6 mi) from the mouth of Lac La Chesnaye, because the current must go around a peninsula stretching on 0.85 km (0.53 mi) to the south. From the mouth of Lac La Chesnaye, the current descends the course of the English River for 11.2 km (7.0 mi) to the Baie des Anglais, located on the north shore of the Gulf of Saint Lawrence.

== Toponym ==
The place names "Rivière des Trois Pointes" and "Lac des Trois Pointes" originate from the fact that this lake has three bays, each ending in a point.

The toponym "Trois Pointes River" was formalized on August 2, 1974, at the Place Names Bank of the Commission de toponymie du Québec.

== See also ==
- List of rivers of Quebec
