= Brisson River (rivière aux Anglais) =

Location
- Country: Canada
- Province: Quebec
- Region: Côte-Nord
- MRC: Manicouagan Regional County Municipality
- Unorganized territory: Rivière-aux-Outardes

Physical characteristics
- Source: Louis lake
  - location: Rivière-aux-Outardes
  - coordinates: 49°26′13″N 68°17′31″W
  - elevation: 319 m (1,047 ft)
- Mouth: Rivière aux Anglais
  - location: Rivière-aux-Outardes
  - coordinates: 49°15′24″N 68°08′01″W
  - elevation: 200 m (660 ft)
- Length: 10.8 km (6.7 mi)

Basin features
- Progression: Rivière aux Anglais, Baie des Anglais
- Tributaries
  - left: (upstream) Outlet of three lakes, Gagnon stream (via Lake Thérèse, outlet of two lakes (via Lake Brisson).
  - right: (upstream) Outlet from Lake Smith, outlet from a lake (via Lake Thérèse), outlet from a lake (via Lake Thérèse), outlet from a lake (via Lake Brisson).

The Brisson river is a tributary of the rivière aux Anglais flowing in the unorganized territory of Rivière-aux-Outardes, in the Manicouagan Regional County Municipality, in the administrative region of Côte-Nord, in the province of Quebec, in Canada.

The Brisson river valley is mainly served by the English river path.

The surface of the English River is generally frozen from the beginning of December to the end of March, except the rapids areas; however, safe circulation on the ice is generally from mid-December to mid-March.

== Geography ==
The Brisson River rises on the Canadian Shield, at Lake Louis (length: 1.2 km (0.75 mi); altitude: 319 m (1,047 ft)). This forest lake is surrounded by mountains. The mouth of the lake is located 3.7 km (2.3 mi) southwest of the mouth of the Brisson river, 2.1 km (1.3 mi) west of a curve in the Rivière des Anglais and 5.9 km (3.7 mi) northeast of a bay on the Manicouagan River.

From the head lake, the course of the Brisson river descends on 10.8 km (6.7 mi) entirely in the forest zone, with a drop of 119 m (390 ft), according to the following segments:

- 1.6 km (0.99 mi) north-west across Lake Philippe (length: 0.9 km (0.56 mi); altitude: 304 m (997 ft)), to its mouth;
- 2.7 km (1.7 mi) north-west crossing lac Brisson (length: 2.4 km (1.5 mi); altitude: 304 m (997 ft)), to its mouth;
- 2.1 km (1.3 mi) first towards the north by crossing a small lake, then towards the south-east by crossing Lake Thérèse (length: 1.9 km (1.2 mi); altitude: 243 m (797 ft)) which is located in a deep valley and collects the Gagnon stream (coming from the northwest), to its mouth;
- 1.8 km (1.1 mi) towards the south-east in a deep valley, crossing three small lakes, until the dam located at a discharge (coming from the north-west) of three lakes;
- 2.6 km (1.6 mi) towards the south-east in a deep valley which opens onto a forest plain at the end of the segment, until its mouth which pours out on the west bank of the Baie des Anglais, on the north shore of the estuary of Saint Lawrence.

The Brisson river flows on the north bank of the intermediate course of the English river, in the unorganized territory of Rivière-aux-Outardes. This confluence is located in an area of rapids 0.17 km (0.11 mi) downstream from the confluence of the Tremblay River. From the confluence of the Brisson river, the current descends the course of the English river of 26.9 km (16.7 mi).

== Toponym ==
The term "Brisson" is a family name of French origin.

The toponym "Brisson river" was formalized on August 2, 1974, at the Place Names Bank of the Commission de toponymie du Québec.

== See also ==
- List of rivers of Quebec
