= Franquelin Lake =

Lake in Quebec, Canada

Coordinates: 49°33′20″N 68°18′03″W

- Location within Quebec
- Location: Rivière-aux-Outardes, Manicouagan Regional County Municipality, Côte-Nord, Québec, Canada
- Primary inflows: (clockwise from the mouth) discharge from two small lakes (via Baie au Castor), discharge from two small lakes (via Philippe Bay), discharge from three small lakes (via Wood Bay), discharge from two small lakes, via Grand Lac Chameau, discharge from a small lake (via Saint-Pierre bay), discharge from a group of small lakes), discharge from two small lakes (via the bay ?), discharge from a small lake (via the bay ?), stream, discharge from a lake (via Ken Bay), discharge from a lake (via Marc Bay), discharge from a few small lakes, discharge from a set of lakes.
- Primary outflows: Franquelin River
- Basin countries: Canada
- Max. length: 7.5 kilometres (4.7 mi)
- Max. width: 3.3 kilometres (2.1 mi)
- Surface elevation: 395 metres (1,296 ft)
- Settlements: Rivière-aux-Outardes

Lake Franquelin (French: Lac Franquelin, pronounced [lak fʁɑ̃klɛ̃]) is a freshwater body of the watershed of Franquelin River, in the unorganized territory of Rivière-aux-Outardes, in the Manicouagan, in the administrative region of Côte-Nord, in the province of Quebec, in Canada.

The surroundings of Lac Franquelin are served by a few forest roads which indirectly connect south to the route 138.

Forestry is the main economic activity around the lake.

The surface of Lake Franquelin is usually frozen from the beginning of December to the end of March; however, traffic on the ice is generally safe from mid-December to mid-March.

== Geography ==
Lac Franquelin is located in the unorganized territory of Rivière-aux-Outardes. This complex lake has a hundred islands. The main bays are: Fosse Lachance, Lise, Castor, Philippe, Wood, Guides, Bernard, Jumelles and Saint-Pierre. This lake turns out to be the main body of water at the head of the Franquelin River side. Lac Franquelin has a length of 7.5 km (4.7 mi), a maximum width of 3.3 km (2.1 mi) and an altitude of 395 m (1,296 ft).

From the mouth of Lake Franquelin, the current descends on generally east, then south-east, following the course of the Franquelin River, to flow dump on the north shore of the estuary of Saint Lawrence.

== Toponym ==
The toponym "Lac Franquelin" derives from the name of the river of the same name.

The term Franquelin evokes the life work of Jean-Baptiste-Louis Franquelin (1650-1712). Born in 1650 in Villebernin in the county of Burgundy in France, Franquelin arrived in 1671 in New France. When he arrived, he started working in the fur trade. Coming from the same region of Palluau, in France, as he, Louis de Buade de Frontenac expressly asked him in 1674 to devote himself full time to cartography. Consequently, Franquelin carried out in 1683 the plans of the upper and lower town of Quebec. In 1687, as part of his role as royal hydrographer, Franquelin taught navigation in Quebec.

Between 1689 and 1691, Franquelin practiced as an engineer and drew up in particular the plans of the royal battery in Quebec. According to the cartographic archives, Franquelin is considered to have produced around fifty maps. Among the notorious maps of its design, there is in particular the map illustrating the geographical observations of Jolliet during his exploratory expedition of 1673 on the Mississippi River as well as that of Louisiana according to the observations of La Salle rider. In 1694, Franquelin returned to France where he continued his career until his death after 1712.

The toponym "Lac Franquelin" was formalized on December 5, 1968, at the Place Names Bank of the Commission de toponymie du Québec.

== See also ==
- Gulf of Saint Lawrence
- List of rivers of Quebec
