= Bouchard River =

Location
- Country: Canada
- Province: Quebec
- Region: Côte-Nord
- MRC: Manicouagan Regional County Municipality
- Unorganized territory: Franquelin

Physical characteristics
- Source: Little unidentified lake
  - location: Franquelin
  - coordinates: 49°20′47″N 67°53′11″W
  - elevation: 218 m (715 ft)
- Mouth: Franquelin River
  - location: Franquelin
  - coordinates: 49°19′07″N 67°51′15″W
  - elevation: 60 m (200 ft)
- Length: 5.3 km (3.3 mi)

Basin features
- River system: Franquelin River, Gulf of St. Lawrence
- Tributaries
  - left: (upstream) outlet of Perron, Bourgeois, Cyrille and Gleeson lakes, outlet of Gagnon lake.
  - right: (upstream) discharge of Larose Lake.

The Rivière Bouchard is a tributary of the Franquelin River, flowing in the municipality of Franquelin, in the Manicouagan Regional County Municipality, in the administrative region of Côte-Nord, in the province of Quebec, in Canada.

Forestry is the main economic activity in this valley; recreotourism activities, second.

The surface of the Bouchard River is usually frozen from the beginning of November to the end of April, except the rapids areas; however, traffic on the ice is generally safe from late November to early April.

== Geography ==
The Bouchard River draws its source from a small lake (length: one hundred meters; altitude: 218 m (715 ft)) located in the municipality of Franquelin. This mouth is located at:

- 3.9 km (2.4 mi) northwest of the mouth of the Bouchard River;
- 6.1 km (3.8 mi) north-west of the mouth of the Franquelin River.

From its source, the Bouchard River flows over 5.3 km (3.3 mi) with a drop of 158 m (518 ft), especially in forest areas, according to the following segments:

- 2.2 km (1.4 mi) first towards the south-east by forming a loop towards the east to collect the outlet (coming from the north) from Lac Gagnon; then east down the mountain, to the outlet (coming from the north) of two lakes including lakes Perron, Bourgeois, Cyrille and Gleeson;
- 1.2 km (0.75 mi) towards the south in a deep valley, by forming a loop towards the west, until the discharge (coming from the west) of two lakes of which the lake Larose;
- 1.9 km (1.2 mi) towards the east by forming a loop towards the north, to its mouth.

The Bouchard River flows onto the west bank of the Franquelin River. This confluence is located at:

- 4.2 km (2.6 mi) north of the mouth of the Franquelin River;
- 18.7 km (11.6 mi) south-west of the village center of Godbout;
- 32.6 km (20.3 mi) north-east of downtown Baie-Comeau.

From the mouth of the Bouchard River, the current descends on 12.6 km (7.8 mi) the course of the Franquelin River to the north shore of the Estuary of Saint Lawrence.

== Toponymy ==
The term "Bouchard" proves to be a family name of French origin.

The toponym "Rivière Bouchard" was formalized on December 5, 1968, at the Place Names Bank of the Commission de toponymie du Québec.

== See also ==
- Gulf of St. Lawrence
- List of rivers of Quebec
