= Épinette River =

Location
- Country: Canada
- Province: Quebec
- Region: Côte-Nord
- MRC: Manicouagan Regional County Municipality
- City: Baie-Comeau

Physical characteristics
- Source: Unidentified lake
  - location: Rivière-aux-Outardes
  - coordinates: 49°22′32″N 68°15′24″W
  - elevation: 229 m (751 ft)
- Mouth: Rivière aux Anglais
  - location: Baie-Comeau
  - coordinates: 49°19′40″N 68°14′14″W
  - elevation: 74 m (243 ft)
- Length: 10.5 km (6.5 mi)

Basin features
- Progression: Rivière aux Anglais, Baie des Anglais
- Tributaries
  - left: (upstream) Forest stream.
  - right: (upstream) Outlet of Lac Saint-Joseph, outlet of a small lake, outlet of a lake, outlet of a set of lakes.

The Épinette River is a tributary of the rivière aux Anglais flowing in the unorganized territory Rivière-aux-Outardes and the town of Baie-Comeau, in the Manicouagan Regional County Municipality, in the administrative region of Côte-Nord, in the province of Quebec, in Canada.

The Épinette river valley is served mainly by a forest road that goes up the valley and the English river path in the lower part.

The surface of the Épinette River is generally frozen from the beginning of December to the end of March, except the rapids areas; however, safe circulation on the ice is generally from mid-December to mid-March.

== Geography ==
The Épinette River rises on the Canadian Shield, at a small unidentified lake (length: 0.2 km (0.12 mi); altitude: 229 m (751 ft)). The mouth (south side) of this small forest lake is located 1.8 km (1.1 mi) southwest of the course of the English River; 15.9 km (9.9 mi) north-west of the confluence of the rivière aux Anglais and Baie des Anglais, on the north shore of the Gulf of St. Lawrence.

From the head lake, the course of the Épinette river descends on 10.5 km (6.5 mi) entirely in the forest zone, with a drop of 155 m (509 ft), according to the following segments:

- 5.2 km (3.2 mi) to the south, first winding between the mountains when entering Baie-Comeau territory, until the outlet (coming from the northwest) of three small lakes, then meandering through a forest plain to the outlet (coming from the west) of Lac Bum and Gérin;
- 3.7 km (2.3 mi) eastwards to a stream (coming from the north), then forming a hook towards the south by winding around a mountain, to the discharge (coming from the west) from a small mountain lake, then east, to a bend in the river (in the marsh area), corresponding to the outlet (coming from the south) of Lac Saint-Joseph;
- 1.6 km (0.99 mi) north-east first in the marsh area, then crossing Lac Cinq Cents (length: 0.6 km (0.37 mi); altitude: 83 m (272 ft)); then east to its mouth.

The Épinette river flows on the west shore of Lac Fer à Cheval, which is crossed to the southeast by the rivière aux Anglais, in the town of Baie-Comeau. This confluence is located 10.9 km (6.8 mi) northwest of the mouth of the English river and 14.7 km (9.1 mi) northwest of downtown Baie-Comeau. From the confluence of the Épinette river, the current descends the course of the English river for 18.6 km (11.6 mi) to the Baie des Anglais, located on the north shore of the Gulf of St. Lawrence.

== Toponym ==
A map published in 1938 mentions "Épinette Creek" to designate this watercourse.

The toponym "Rivière Épinette" was formalized on August 2, 1974, at the Place Names Bank of the Commission de toponymie du Québec.

== See also ==
- List of rivers of Quebec
