= Godbout River =

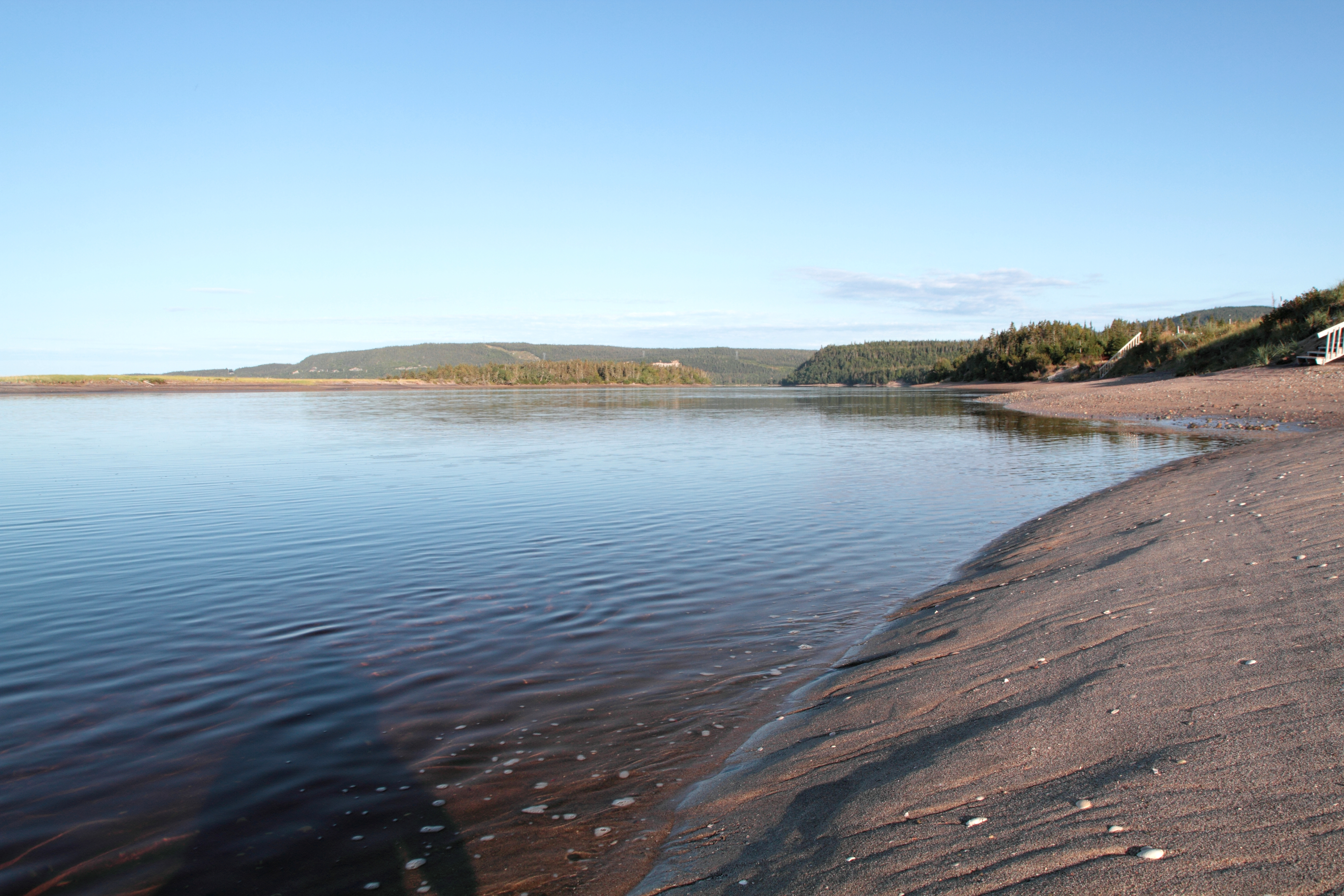
- Mouth of the river

- Location within Quebec
- Native name: Rivière Godbout (French)

Physical characteristics
- Source: Lac de la Traverse
  - coordinates: 49.970278°N 67.898333°W
- Mouth: Estuary of Saint Lawrence
  - location: Godbout
  - coordinates: 49.3083333°N 67.6047222°W
- Length: 112 kilometres (70 mi)

The Godbout River (French: Rivière Godbout) is a river in the Côte-Nord region of Quebec, Canada, that flows into the Estuary of Saint Lawrence beside the village of Godbout.

== Location ==
The Godbout River is in Godbout, Manicouagan Regional County Municipality. It is 112 kilometres (70 mi) long. The river forms in Lac de la Traverse, which in turn is fed by the small Rivière Hall, which forms just south of Lake Sainte-Anne. It flows in a generally southeast direction to enter the Saint Lawrence just south of the village of Godbout. Its main tributary, the Rivière Godbout Est, flows south from the southeast bay of Lake Sainte-Anne, which is dammed, to join the south part of the Godbout River.

== Name ==
The indigenous Montagnais called the river Oiaouirabougou, or Oiauirabugu, meaning "whirlpool". The name Godbout or Godebout is found in documents from the 17th century. There are two theories about the origin of the name. One is that it was named after François Godbout, caption of a Hudson's Bay Company schooner. It is more likely that the village of Godbout was named after Nicolas Godeboust (1634−1674), a navigator and pilot who was mentioned in the 1666 census, and the river was named after the village. A 1670 text by Père Albanel mentions the rivière Godebout, and a 1684 map by Jean-Baptiste-Louis Franquelin shows the place named Godebou. The name was made official on 5 December 1968.

== Environment ==
A map of the Ecological regions of Quebec shows the Rivière Godbout Est rising and flowing south through the eastern spruce/moss domain of the boreal zone. The Rivière Godbout proper flows through the fir/white birch domain of the boreal zone. It has a large watershed and many small tributaries. It flows through the mountains below rocky escarpments, and has many section of rapids and seven waterfalls. The surroundings are boreal forests mainly populated by conifers.

== Fishing river ==
Napoléon-Alexandre Comeau (1848–1923) was a hunter, fishery warden, government official, naturalist, and author. His father was a Hudson’s Bay Company agent, and he grew up in trading posts in the Îlets-Jérémie, Mingan, and Sept-Îles. In the 1860s he became fishery warden on the Godbout River, a position he held for over 60 years. The river at that time was a popular salmon fishing destination for businessmen and politicians from Canada and the United States. Comeau used his experience of fishing and hunting in the Côte-Nord to become an accomplished naturalist, author of articles in National Geographic and Forest and Stream, and involved in many aspects of management of the environment.

The river is still known as one of the best of Quebec's salmon rivers and also holds speckled trout. The Atlantic salmon (Salmo salar) of the Gobout watershed are mainly large salmon that come to the estuary in early June. The salmon cannot cross the falls when the flow is high, above 25 cubic metres per second (880 cu ft/s), so linger in the holes of the downstream section until early August. About 70 kilometres (43 mi) of the river is managed by a zone d'exploitation contrôlée (managed use zone), the Zec des Rivières-Godbout-et-Mistassini. The downstream Cap-Nord section is owned by a private club, but the right to fish it may be obtained through an agreement with the ZEC. The river was visited by coureurs des bois hunting for fur, and the region is known for its hunting potential.

== Sources ==
- "Accueil", Rivière Godbout
- Frenette, Pierre (2005). "Comeau, Napoleon-Alexandre (baptized Alexandre-Napoléon)". In Cook, Ramsay; Bélanger, Réal (eds.). Dictionary of Canadian Biography. Vol. XV (1921–1930) (online ed.). University of Toronto Press.
- Godbout (in French), Commission de toponymie du Québec
- Lac de la Traverse (in French), Ressources naturelles Canada
- "La rivière", Rivière Godbout (in French)
- Rivière Godbout (in French), Commission de toponymie du Québec
- Rivière Godbout (in French), Ressources naturelles Canada
- Rivière Godbout Est (in French), Ressources naturelles Canada
- Saucier, J.-P.; Robitaille, A.; Grondin, P.; Bergeron, J.-F.; Gosselin, J. (2011), Les régions écologiques du Québec méridional (PDF) (map), 4 (in French), Ministère des Ressources naturelles et de la Faune, archived from the original (PDF) on 19 June 2020
