= Thompson River (disambiguation) =

Thompson River is the largest tributary of the Fraser River, flowing through the south-central portion of British Columbia, Canada.

Thompson River may also refer to:

== Canada ==
- Thompson River (Notawassi Lake tributary), a river in Lac-Douaire (unorganized territory), MRC Antoine-Labelle, Laurentides (administrative region), Quebec
- Thompson River (De Montigny Lake tributary), a tributary of the Milky River in Quebec; see List of rivers of Quebec#Quebec rivers flowing in Ontario (or tributaries of Ontario rivers)
- Thompson River (Franquelin River tributary), a tributary of the Franquelin River in Franquelin, Manicouagan, Côte-Nord, Quebec
- Thompson River Salish, the northern branch of the Thompson River in British Columbia

== United-States ==
- Thompson River (Missouri)
- Thompson River (Montana)
  - Little Thompson River (Montana), a tributary of Thompson River, Montana
- Big Thompson River, a tributary of South Platte River, in the U.S. state of Colorado
  - Little Thompson River, a tributary of Big Thompson River

== See also ==
- Thompson River Salish, a name for the Nlaka'pamux, a Canadian First Nation
  - Thompson River Salish language, a name for Nlaka'pamuctsin also known as Nlaka'pamux, an Interior Salishan language spoken in the Canadian province of British Columbia
- Thompson Rivers University, Kamloops, British Columbia, Canada
- Thomson River (Queensland), western Queensland, Australia
- Thomson River (Victoria), Victoria, Australia
