= Rivière à la Loutre =

Rivière à la Loutre or Rivière de la Loutre may refer to:

== Places ==
=== Canada and United States ===
- Otter River (Northwest Branch Saint John River tributary) (French: Rivière à la Loutre), in Montmagny Regional County Municipality, Quebec and Maine, United States

=== Canada ===
- Rivière de la Grande Loutre, tributary of the Péribonka River in Passes-Dangereuses, Quebec
- Petite rivière de la Loutre, on Anticosti Island, Quebec
- Rivière à la Loutre (rivière du Sud tributary), in Sainte-Euphémie-sur-Rivière-du-Sud, Quebec
- Rivière à la Loutre (Témiscamingue), tributary of the Ottawa River in Témiscamingue Regional County Municipality, Quebec
- Rivière à la Loutre (La Malbaie), in La Malbaie, Quebec
- Rivière à la Loutre (Saguenay River tributary), in Saint-Fulgence, Quebec
- Rivière à la Loutre (Ashuapmushuan River tributary), in Saint-Thomas-Didyme, Quebec
- Rivière à la Loutre (Gouffre River tributary), in Capitale-Nationale, Quebec
- Rivière à la Loutre (L'Île-d'Anticosti), on Anticosti Island, Quebec

=== United States ===
- Loutre River (Missouri River), a tributary of the Missouri River in Missouri

== See also ==
- Loutre (disambiguation)
- Otter (disambiguation)
