= Françoise River =

Location
- Country: Canada
- Province: Quebec
- Region: Côte-Nord
- MRC: Manicouagan Regional County Municipality
- Unorganized territory: Rivière-aux-Outardes

Physical characteristics
- Source: Unidentified lake
  - location: Rivière-aux-Outardes
  - coordinates: 49°34′19″N 68°09′19″W
  - elevation: 441 m (1,447 ft)
- Mouth: Rivière aux Anglais
  - location: Rivière-aux-Outardes
  - coordinates: 49°30′35″N 68°14′07″W
  - elevation: 259 m (850 ft)
- Length: 11.1 km (6.9 mi)

Basin features
- Progression: Rivière aux Anglais, Baie des Anglais
- Tributaries
  - left: (upstream) stream, discharge from three lakes, three discharge from lakes.
  - right: (upstream) stream, discharge from a small lake.

The Françoise river is a tributary of the rivière aux Anglais flowing in the unorganized territory Rivière-aux-Outardes, in the Manicouagan Regional County Municipality, in the administrative region of Côte-Nord, in the province of Quebec, in Canada.

The Françoise river valley is mainly served by the English river path.

The surface of the Françoise river is generally frozen from the beginning of December to the end of March, except the rapids areas; however, safe circulation on the ice is generally from mid-December to mid-March.

== Geography ==
The Françoise river has its source on the Canadian Shield, at a small unidentified lake (length: 0.24 km (0.15 mi); altitude: 441 m (1,447 ft)). The mouth (south side) of this small forest lake is located 9.0 km (5.6 mi) northeast of the confluence of the Françoise river and the rivière aux Anglais, at 0.8 km (0.50 mi) south-west of a bay in lake Franquelin and 35.2 km (21.9 mi) north-west of the confluence of the rivière aux Anglais and Baie des Anglais on the north shore of the Gulf of St. Lawrence.

From the head lake, the course of the Françoise river descends on 11.1 km (6.9 mi) entirely in the forest zone, with a drop of 182 m (597 ft), according to the following segments:

- 1.2 km (0.75 mi) southwards crossing first two small lakes, then a third lake (length: 0.5 km (0.31 mi); altitude: 427 m (1,401 ft) ) on 0.26 km (0.16 mi), to its mouth;
- 1.5 km (0.93 mi) southerly in a straight line, crossing an unidentified lake (length: 0.8 km (0.50 mi); altitude: 365 m (1,198 ft)) on its full length, to its mouth;
- 6.0 km (3.7 mi) to the south relatively in a straight line in a deep valley, crossing a small lake (length: 0.6 km (0.37 mi); altitude: 365 m (1,198 ft)) in mid-segment, collecting on the west side the discharge from a lake, then collecting on the east side two discharges from lakes, up to a bend in the river, corresponding to the discharge (coming from the east) of three lakes;
- 2.4 km (1.5 mi) towards the east relatively in a straight line in a deep valley, until its mouth.

The Françoise river flows on the northeast bank of the upper course of the rivière aux Anglais, in the unorganized territory of Rivière-aux-Outardes. This confluence is located downstream from Lake Pascal and downstream from the confluence of the Tremblay River. From the confluence of the Françoise river, the current descends the course of the English river for 48.7 km (30.3 mi) to the Baie des Anglais, located on the north shore of the Gulf of St. Lawrence.

== Toponym ==
The term "Françoise" is a first name of French origin.

The toponym "Françoise River" was formalized on August 2, 1974, at the Place Names Bank of the Commission de toponymie du Québec.

== See also ==
- List of rivers of Quebec
