= Lac La Chesnaye (Baie-Comeau) =

Lake in Baie-Comeau, Quebec, Canada

- Location within Quebec
- Location: Baie-Comeau, Manicouagan Regional County Municipality, Côte-Nord, Quebec, Canada
- Coordinates: 49°19′30″N 68°11′19″W
- Primary inflows: (clockwise from the mouth) Discharge from a lake, discharge from a set of lakes in Lac Sans Baie (coming from the east), discharge from Lac Croche (coming from the southwest), rivière aux Anglais, discharge (coming from southwest), outlet (from the west) of three lakes, outlet (from the north) of the rivière des Trois Pointes.
- Primary outflows: Rivière aux Anglais
- Basin countries: Canada
- Max. length: 5.8 kilometres (3.6 mi)
- Max. width: 2.6 kilometres (1.6 mi)
- Surface elevation: 63 metres (207 ft)
- Settlements: Baie-Comeau

The lac La Chesnaye is a freshwater body of the watershed of the rivière aux Anglais, located in the territory of the town of Baie-Comeau, in the Manicouagan Regional County Municipality, in the administrative region of Côte-Nord, in the province of Quebec, in Canada.

The eastern side of Lac La Chesnaye is served by a few forest roads connecting from the south to route 138. Due to the mountainous terrain, there are no roads on the west side that are suitable for cars.

Forestry is the main economic activity around the lake.

== Geography ==
Lac La Chesnaye is located in the eastern part of the town of Baie-Comeau. This deformed lake surrounded by mountains is crossed to the east, then to the north, by the rivière aux Anglais. It has a length of 5.8 km (3.6 mi), a maximum width of 2.6 km (1.6 mi) and an altitude of 63 m (207 ft). It has six islands. This lake has a dam erected at its mouth. This lake is divided into two parts separated by a strait of 0.27 km (0.17 mi) in its center, because of a peninsula attached to the eastern shore and stretching over approximately 1.0 km (0.62 mi) to the west. The northern part has five bays, three of which stretch north, including the 0.9 km (0.56 mi) bay leading to the mouth. The southern part has three large bays at the foot of high cliffs.

From the mouth of Lac La Chesnaye, the current descends on 11.2 km (7.0 mi) generally towards the south-east, following the course of the Rivière aux Anglais, in particular crossing the lake Unknown and the lac de la Rivière aux Anglais, to go to spill on the west shore of Baie aux Anglais, on the north shore of the estuary of Saint Lawrence.

== Toponym ==
The toponym "Lac La Chesnaye" evokes the memory of Charles Aubert de La Chesnaye, a merchant and fur trader, financier and main businessman in New France in the 17th century. The term "Chesnaye" is a graphic form of old French; it means "Chênaie" (or Chesnaie), or a field planted with oaks

The toponym "Lac La Chesnaye" was formalized on December 5, 1968, at the Place Names Bank of the Commission de toponymie du Québec.

=== See also ===
- Baie-Comeau, a city
- Gulf of St. Lawrence, a stream
- List of rivers of Quebec
- Manicouagan Regional County Municipality
- Rivière aux Anglais, a stream
