= Zec des Rivières-Godbout-et-Mistassini =

Controlled area in the Mistassini river in Canada

- Location within Quebec
- Location: Canada, Quebec, Manicouagan Regional County Municipality
- Nearest city: Godbout
- Coordinates: 49°18′30″N 67°36′19″W
- Area: Length of 90 kilometres (56 mi)
- Established: 1980

The Zec des Rivières-Godbout-et-Mistassini (known until 1996 "Zec de la rivière-Godbout") is a "zone d'exploitation contrôlée" (controlled harvesting zone (ZEC)) in the municipalities of Franquelin and Godbout, in Manicouagan Regional County Municipality (RCM), in the administrative region of Côte-Nord, in Quebec, in Canada. Zec administers the lower segments of the Godbout River and Mistassini River (Franquelin) which are used for recreative salmon fishing.

== Geography ==
Godbout River

The Godbout River flows from north to south, in the municipality of Franquelin, then Godbout. It flows into the Gulf of St. Lawrence, west of the town of Godbout and the Bay of Godbout. After crossing the route138, the river still flows 3.2 km to the southeast to its mouth along a sandbar separating the Bay of Molson, located on the west side. Downstream of the route138, there are four small islands on the river, of which Gilmour Island and Laws Island.

Godbout River has 29 salmon water pits. The first pit is located on the island Gilmour.

Rivière Mistassini (Franquelin)

Lake Mistassini is the main headwater lake of the Mistassini River (Franquelin). Its mouth located southeast of the lake empties into a landfill to reach the lake Bourdon. The waters of the river descends through the Barron and Montreuil lakes. Then the river crosses under the bridge of the railway and the route 138, then goes along the coast of Gulf of St. Lawrence. Just south of the route 138, the river receives water from the outlet of Lake Nord-Ouest. Then, the river empties into a bay on the north shore of Gulf of St. Lawrence, near the "Baie à Guy" (Bayof Guy). The course of the river is mostly focused towards the southeast.

Jurisdiction of Zec

The jurisdiction of the ZEC begins at the mouth of the Godbout River (the "Bout du Banc" (End of the Bench)) and covers the route of the river upstream to the first northwest (about 5.9 km), then north up to Lake cypress. Godbout River traverses 30.7 kilometers on the Réserve de biodiversité projetée de la Vallée de la rivière Godbout (Projected biodiversity reserve of the Valley of Godbout river).

== History ==
A fur trading post was operated on Godbout River for more than two centuries. In history, this river has been granted to various operators including Hudson's Bay. Finally, in 1873, the territory was acquired by Messrs Madge Fraser, JH Molson and F. Stuart Molson.

Born in 1848, Napoleon Alexandre Comeau has served as a guide and caretaker at the age of 11 years, from 1859 until the end of his life. For this work of life, he is a legendary figure in the Côte-Nord (North Shore). He was a naturalist, a fisherman, a hunter, trapper and a renowned physician.

His extensive knowledge of salmon is recognized in several publications including "Forest and Stream" for which he wrote regular columns. In 1945 the Garneau Editions publish "Life and sport on the North Shore", a bible for adventurers and nature lovers.

== Toponymy ==
The following names are all bound by the same origin and are located in the same area on the North Shore of the Gulf of St. Lawrence: "Zec des Rivières-Godbout-et-Mistassini", Small Godbout river Godbout River, Godbout East River, the lake Godbout and Réserve de biodiversité projetée de la Vallée de la rivière Godbout (Projected Biodiversity Reserve of the Valley of Godbout river).

The name "Zec des Rivières-Godbout-et-Mistassini" was formalized on January 29, 1996, at the Bank of place names in the Commission de toponymie du Québec (Geographical Names Board of Quebec)

== See also ==
- Zec Trinité
- Franquelin River
