= Rivière Franquelin Branche Ouest =

Location
- Country: Canada
- Province: Quebec
- Region: Côte-Nord
- MRC: Manicouagan Regional County Municipality
- Unorganized territory: Rivière-aux-Outardes

Physical characteristics
- Source: Little unidentified lake
  - location: Rivière-aux-Outardes
  - coordinates: 49°30′12″N 68°10′45″W
  - elevation: 430 m (1,410 ft)
- Mouth: Franquelin River
  - location: Franquelin
  - coordinates: 49°21′22″N 67°50′41″W
  - elevation: 67 m (220 ft)
- Length: 40.0 km (24.9 mi)

Basin features
- River system: Franquelin River, Gulf of St. Lawrence
- Tributaries
  - left: (upstream) discharge from four lakes including Lac Levasseur, discharge from two lakes, discharge from two lakes, discharge from two lakes, discharge from two lakes, discharge from four lakes, discharge from Lake Thibeault, discharge from a lake, discharge from a lake, discharge from a small lake, Chasseur stream, discharge from Lake Lynch, discharge from a set of lakes including Guay Lake, discharge from a lake, discharge from Lake Beaudin, discharge from four lakes, discharge from a set of small lakes.
  - right: (upstream) discharge from four lakes, Lessard River, discharge from four lakes, discharge from three lakes, discharge from a lake, discharge from four lakes, discharge from Lake Audet, discharge from a small lake, discharge from a set of lakes, discharge of three lakes, discharge of four lakes, discharge of a group of small lakes, discharge of Lake Chapados, discharge of Lake Chambers.

The Rivière Franquelin Branche Ouest (French pronunciation: [ʁivjɛʁ fʁɑ̃klɛ̃ bʁɑ̃ʃ wɛst], Franquelin River West Branch) is a tributary of the Franquelin River, flowing in the unorganized territory of Rivière-aux-Outardes and in the municipality of Franquelin, in the Manicouagan Regional County Municipality, itself in the administrative region of Côte-Nord, in the province of Quebec, in Canada.

This valley is served by a forest road which goes up the valley. Forestry is the main economic activity in this valley; recreational tourism, second.

The surface of the Franquelin Branche Ouest river is usually frozen from the beginning of November to the end of April, except the rapids; traffic on the ice is generally safe from late November to early April.

== Geography ==
The Franquelin Branche Ouest river draws its source from a small lake (length: 0.13 km (0.081 mi); altitude: 430 m (1,410 ft)) located in the unorganized territory of Rivière-aux-Outardes. This mouth is located at:

- 31.1 km (19.3 mi) north-west of the village center of Franquelin;
- 29.2 km (18.1 mi) west of the mouth of the Franquelin River West Branch.

From its source, the Franquelin Branche Ouest river flows over 40.0 km (24.9 mi) with a drop of 363 m (1,191 ft), mainly in forest areas, according to the following segments:

Upper course of the Franquelin River West Branch (segment of 15.0 km (9.3 mi))

- 2.3 km (1.4 mi) first towards the south by going down the cliff, then towards the east in a valley more and more steeped by collecting the discharge (coming from the south) of the Chambers lake, until the outlet (coming from the south) from Chapados Lake;
- 3.4 km (2.1 mi) eastward in a relatively straight line in a deep valley, to the outlet (coming from the north) of Lac Beaudin;
- 4.7 km (2.9 mi) east to the outlet (coming from the north) of Lac Guay;
- 4.6 km (2.9 mi) eastward in a relatively straight line, collecting the discharge (coming from the south) from Lac Audet, bending south-east at the end of the segment, up to Chasseur stream ( coming from the northeast);

Lower course of the Franquelin River West Branch (segment of 25.0 km (15.5 mi))

- 4.6 km (2.9 mi) first towards the south, then towards the east by forming a loop towards the south to go up towards the northeast, up to a bend of the river;
- 8.8 km (5.5 mi) generally towards the south-east at the foot of a mountain cliff, forming several streamers by collecting a discharge (coming from the north) from a lake and two discharges (coming from the south-west ) a group of small lakes, up to a bend in the river corresponding to the outlet (coming from the southwest) of 3 lakes;
- 5.3 km (3.3 mi) towards the northeast by collecting three discharges (coming from the north) from lakes and a discharge (coming from the south) from two lakes, up to a bend in the river;
- 2.0 km (1.2 mi) south-east at the foot of a mountain cliff, to the confluence of the Lessard River (coming from the west);
- 4.3 km (2.7 mi) first towards the south-east, then towards the east by forming a loop towards the south to collect the discharge (coming from the south) of a lake, up to its mouth.

The Franquelin West Branch River flows onto the west bank of the Franquelin River. This confluence is located on the west side of Cache-Trois, either:

- 8.1 km (5.0 mi) north of the mouth of the Franquelin River;
- 18.4 km (11.4 mi) west of the village center of Godbout;
- 35.2 km (21.9 mi) north-east of downtown Baie-Comeau.

From the mouth of the West Branch Franquelin River, the current descends on 19.0 km (11.8 mi) the course of the Franquelin River to the north shore of the estuary of Saint Lawrence.

== Toponymy ==
The toponym "Franquelin Branche Ouest" was formalized on August 2, 1974, at the Place Names Bank of the Commission de toponymie du Québec.

== See also ==
- List of rivers of Quebec
