= Thompson River (Franquelin River tributary) =

Location
- Country: Canada
- Province: Quebec
- Region: Côte-Nord
- MRC: Manicouagan Regional County Municipality
- Municipality: Franquelin

Physical characteristics
- Source: Unidentified Lake
  - location: Franquelin
  - coordinates: 49°19′45″N 67°49′46″W
  - elevation: 129 m (423 ft)
- Mouth: Franquelin River
  - location: Franquelin
  - coordinates: 49°19′09″N 67°50′33″W
  - elevation: 61 m (200 ft)
- Length: 2.0 km (1.2 mi)

The Thompson River is a tributary of the Franquelin River, flowing in the township of Franquelin, in the municipality of Franquelin, in the Manicouagan Regional County Municipality, in the administrative region of Côte-Nord, in the province of Quebec, in Canada.

Forestry is the main economic activity in this valley.

The surface of this Middle North Shore river is usually frozen from the beginning of November to the end of April, except the rapids areas; however, traffic on the ice is generally safe from late November to early April.

== Geography ==
The Thompson River originates from an unidentified lake (length: 0.6 km (0.37 mi); altitude: 129 m (423 ft)) located in the municipality of Franquelin. This mouth is located 1.5 km (0.93 mi) northeast of the mouth of the Thompson River.

From its source, the Thompson River flows over 2.0 km (1.2 mi) with a drop of 68 m (223 ft), in the forest zone, according to the following segments:

- 0.6 km (0.37 mi) south across Lake Thompson (length: 0.5 km (0.31 mi); altitude: 128 m (420 ft)), to its mouth. Note: A discharge (coming from the south-east) from four lakes discharges on the south-eastern shore of this lake;
- 1.4 km (0.87 mi) first towards the south while bending towards the south-west, until its mouth.

The Thompson River flows onto the east bank of the Franquelin River. This confluence is located at:

- 4.9 km (3.0 mi) north-east of the mouth of the Franquelin River;
- 18.2 km (11.3 mi) south-west of the village center of Godbout;
- 33.4 km (20.8 mi) north-east of downtown Baie-Comeau.

From the mouth of the Thompson river, the current descends on 7.8 km (4.8 mi) the course of the Franquelin river to the north shore of the estuary of Saint Lawrence.

== Toponymy ==
The term "Thompson" is a family name of English origin. The toponyms "Lake Thompson" and "Thompson River" are linked.

The toponym "Rivière Thompson" was formalized on 1968-12-05 at the Place Names Bank of the Commission de toponymie du Québec.

== See also ==
- Gulf of St. Lawrence
- List of rivers of Quebec
