= Petite-Rivière-Godbout Old Forest =

- Forêt ancienne de la Petite-Rivière-Godbout
- IUCN category III (natural monument or feature)
- Location within Quebec
- Nearest city: Godbout, Quebec
- Coordinates: 49.348885°N 67.627057°W
- Area: 47 ha (120 acres)
- Designation: Old-growth forest
- Designated: 2003
- Governing body: Quebec Ministère des Ressources naturelles, de la Faune et des Parcs

The Petite-Rivière-Godbout Old Forest (French: Forêt ancienne de la Petite-Rivière-Godbout) is a protected area of old-growth forest in the Côte-Nord region of Quebec, classified as an exceptional forest ecosystem.

== Location ==
The Petite-Rivière-Godbout Old Forest is in the municipality of Gobdbout in the Manicouagan Regional County Municipality. It is about 4 kilometres (2.5 mi) northwest of the village of Godbout on the north shore of the Estuary of Saint Lawrence. The forest is administered by Quebecʻs Ministry of Natural Resources, Wildlife and Parks, Forest Environment Directorate. It was designated old-growth forest in 2003, and has IUCN management category III.

The forest has an area of 47 hectares (120 acres). The terrain is moderately rugged, with tall hills covered by thin glacial till and many rocky escarpments. The forest is on the southern slope of a steep hill looking over the Rat Musqué Lake and the Little Godbout River (Petite rivière Godbout). A map of the Ecological regions of Quebec places the Gobout area in ecological region 5g Hautes collines de Baie-Comeau — Sept-Îles in the eastern fir/white birch domain of the boreal zone.

== Flora ==
The Petite-Rivière-Godbout Old Forest is made up of a few stands dominated by northern white-cedar (Thuja occidentalis), which is rare in the Côte-Nord. Usually cedars are found in areas of deciduous and mixed forest. Dry cedar groves growing on rock are even rarer. Other trees are balsam fir (Abies balsamea), black spruce (Picea mariana) and white birch (Betula papyrifera). The forest has never been developed or disturbed by human activities, and for a long time has not suffered from severe natural disturbances such as fire, high winds or insect infestations.

The older cedar trees are 300 to 400 years old. The trunks of the dominant trees have an average diameter of 50 centimetres (20 in) and height of 17 metres (56 ft), while the mature fir stands surrounding the forest are no more than 12 metres (39 ft) high. The regeneration stratum of the forest contains a good proportion of cedars, balsam fir and white birch, so the cedars seem well established. Due to their strength and longevity the cedars should continue to dominate the upper strata of the forest.

Shrubs include mountain maple (Acer spicatum) and Canada yew (Taxus canadensis). In some places the yews are very abundant. The herbaceous layer includes mountain woodsorrel (Oxalis montana), shining firmoss (Huperzia lucidula), Canadian bunchberry (Cornus canadensis), threeleaf goldthread (Coptis trifolia), starflower (Trientalis borealis), spinulose woodfern (Dryopteris carthusiana) and blue-bead lily (Clintonia borealis). Groundcover includes several common species of mosses, usually sparse.

== Sources ==
- Forêt ancienne de la Petite-Rivière-Godbout (PDF) (in French), Ministère des Ressources naturelles, de la Faune et des Parcs, archived from the original (PDF) on 2022-01-21
- Forêt ancienne de la Petite-Rivière-Godbout, Natural Resources Canada
- Forêt ancienne de la Petite-Rivière-Godbout in Canada, Protected Planet
- Saucier, J.-P.; Robitaille, A.; Grondin, P.; Bergeron, J.-F.; Gosselin, J. (2011), Les régions écologiques du Québec méridional (PDF) (map), 4 (in French), Ministère des Ressources naturelles et de la Faune, archived from the original (PDF) on 2020-06-19
