= Outré =

Outré may refer to:

- Outré (Portal album), an album by Portal
- Outré (Jeff Schmidt album), an album by Jeff Schmidt

== See also ==
- Outre-Mer (disambiguation)
- Loutre (disambiguation)
