= Lac à la Loutre (Rivière-aux-Outardes) =

Lake in Rivière-aux-Outardes, Côte-Nord, Quebec, Canada

Coordinates: 49°33′20″N 68°18′03″W

- Location within Quebec
- Location: Rivière-aux-Outardes, Manicouagan Regional County Municipality, Côte-Nord, Québec, Canada
- Primary inflows: (clockwise from the mouth) stream (coming from the south), discharge (coming from the southwest) from several lakes, discharge from three small lakes, discharge (coming from the south-west) from some lakes (via Baie de la Passe), discharge (coming from the north (west) (via Baie Le Pouce, discharge (coming from the north) from lakes Paul and Savard, discharge from two small lakes, discharge from one lake, stream and discharge from two small lakes.
- Primary outflows: Rivière aux Anglais
- Basin countries: Canada
- Max. length: 8.0 kilometres (5.0 mi)
- Max. width: 1.4 kilometres (0.87 mi)
- Surface elevation: 304 metres (997 ft)
- Settlements: Rivière-aux-Outardes

Lac à la Loutre is a freshwater body of the watershed of the rivière aux Anglais, flowing in the unorganized territory of Rivière-aux-Outardes, in the Manicouagan Regional County Municipality, in the administrative region of Côte-Nord, in the province of Quebec, in Canada.

The surroundings of Lac à la Loutre are served by a few forest roads connecting from the south to the "Chemin de la rivière aux Anglais".

Forestry and hydroelectricity are the main economic activities around the lake.

== Geography ==
The "Lac à la Loutre" is located in the unorganized territory of Rivière-aux-Outardes, north of the city of Baie-Comeau. This lake turns out to be the main head water body on the slope of the rivière aux Anglais. The Lac à la Loutre has a length of 8.0 km (5.0 mi), a maximum width of 1.4 km (0.87 mi) and an altitude of 304 m (997 ft).

From the mouth of Lac à la Loutre, the current descends on 65 km (40 mi) generally towards the south-east, following the course of the rivière aux Anglais, in particular passing by end of segment on the north side of an industrial sector in the eastern part of Baie-Comeau, to discharge onto the west shore of Baie aux Anglais, on the north shore of the Estuary of Saint Lawrence.

== Toponym ==
The toponym "lac à la Loutre" was formalized on December 5, 1968 at the Place Names Bank of the Commission de toponymie du Québec.

== See also ==
- Manicouagan Regional County Municipality
- Rivière-aux-Outardes, an unorganized territory
- Rivière aux Anglais, a stream
- Gulf of St. Lawrence, a stream
- List of rivers of Quebec
