= Franquelin River =

Location
- Country: Canada
- Province: Quebec
- Region: Côte-Nord
- MRC: Manicouagan Regional County Municipality
- Unorganized territory and municipality: Rivière-aux-Outardes, Franquelin

Physical characteristics
- Source: Franquelin Lake
  - location: Rivière-aux-Outardes
  - coordinates: 49°31′21″N 68°05′25″W
  - elevation: 395 m (1,296 ft)
- Mouth: Rivière aux Anglais
  - location: Franquelin
  - coordinates: 49°17′26″N 67°53′41″W
  - elevation: 2 m (6.6 ft)
- Length: 67.5 km (41.9 mi)

Basin features
- Tributaries
  - left: (upstream) Tessier Creek, Thompson River, Ma Tante River, Happy Creek, Big-Fall Creek, Chamberland Creek (which originates from Chamberland Lake).
  - right: (upstream) Beaudin Creek, Bouchard River, rivière Franquelin Branche Ouest, Crique Savard.

The Franquelin River (French: rivière Franquelin, pronounced [ʁivjɛʁ fʁɑ̃klɛ̃]) is located in the unorganized territory of Rivière-aux-Outardes and the municipality of Franquelin, in the Manicouagan Regional County Municipality, in the administrative region of Côte-Nord, in the province of Quebec, in Canada.

The Franqueline river valley is served by the route 138 which passes at its mouth. The rest of the valley is served by various forest roads for the needs of forestry and recreational tourism activities.

The surface of the Franquelin River is usually frozen from the beginning of November to the end of April, except the rapids areas; however, safe circulation on the ice is generally from late November to early April.

== Geography ==
The basin of the Franquelin river is located between that of the Godbout River (to the East) and that of the Mistassini River (to the West).

Lake Franquelin is the main head lake of the Franquelin River. Going south, the river crosses the township of Franquelin and the municipality of Franquelin, where it flows into the St. Lawrence River on the west side of the village of Franquelin after seeing past under route 138 which runs along the coast. The toponym Franquelin has been designated since 1972.

Main tributaries of the Franquelin river (from the mouth):

- West side: Beaudin brook, Bouchard brook, rivière Franquelin Branche Ouest, Savard Creek;
- East side: Tessier Creek, Thompson River, Happy Creek, Big-Fall Creek, Chamberland Creek (which comes from Chamberland Lake).

Starting from the mouth, going up the river, a segment of around 45 km (28 mi) is a protected area for salmon.

From Franquelin Lake, the course of the Franquelin River descends on 67.5 km (41.9 mi), with a drop of 393 m (1,289 ft), according to the following segments:

Upper course of the Franquelin River (segment of 25.6 km (15.9 mi))

- 9.4 km (5.8 mi) first towards the northeast by collecting the discharge (coming from the southeast) of a set of lakes including McCormick lake and by collecting a stream (coming from the northwest ), up to a bend in the river; then on 5.0 km (3.1 mi) to the east, up to a bend corresponding to the discharge of the river? (coming from the north);
- 13.1 km (8.1 mi) first towards the south-east, winding heavily through a forest plain, collecting the discharge (coming from the southwest) from a lake, up to the discharge (coming from the north) of several lakes;
- 3.1 km (1.9 mi) the north-east by forming a curve towards the south-east and by collecting the discharge (coming from the south-west) of the Lac du Poulailler, up to a bend of the river corresponding to a stream (coming from the northwest);

Intermediate course of the Franquelin River (segment of 22.9 km (14.2 mi))

- 2.7 km (1.7 mi) to the east by collecting Chamberland stream (coming from the north) and forming a slight curve towards the south, up to a bend in the river, corresponding to the outlet of Big Fall Creek (coming from the northeast);
- 5.8 km (3.6 mi) to the south in a flared valley, forming a large W, then entering a valley encased in a straight line, up to Happy Creek (i.e. the outlet of Happy and Heather lakes, coming from northeast);
- 8.6 km (5.3 mi) first towards the south-east on 5.0 km (3.1 mi) almost in a straight line in a deep valley by collecting in particular Savard cove (i.e. the outlet of Savard lake coming from the west), then turning south on 3.6 km (2.2 mi) in a deep valley, forming a small hook towards the east at the end of the segment, until the confluence of the Ma Tante River (coming from the east);
- 5.8 km (3.6 mi) first towards the south, then the southwest in a deep valley, crossing the Bellefeuille falls and forming a loop towards the east, until the confluence of the rivière Franquelin Branche Ouest (coming from the west);

Lower course of the Franquelin River (segment of 19.0 km (11.8 mi))

From the confluence of the rivière Franquelin Branche Ouest, the current descends on:

- 6.4 km (4.0 mi) towards the south by immediately collecting the Les Fourches stream (coming from the east), by forming a loop towards the east, then some large coils, collecting the discharge (coming from the northeast) of several lakes, until the confluence of the river Bouchard (from the west);
- 4.8 km (3.0 mi) towards the south-east by successively forming a loop towards the south, then a loop towards the north, until the confluence of the Thompson River (coming from the north-east);
- 3.7 km (2.3 mi) to the south by crossing rapids and collecting the Tessier stream (coming from the northeast), then to the southeast by forming a loop towards the north at the end of the segment, until 'at Beaudin Brook;
- 4.1 km (2.5 mi) first towards the south-east by forming a loop towards the east, then towards the south-west by collecting the outlet of Lac Morins and Lac à Thomas, to its mouthpiece.

The Franquelin River flows on the north shore of the Gulf of St. Lawrence, on the east side of the village of Franquelin.

== Toponymy ==
The toponyms using the term "Franquelin" in the area of Manicouagan Regional County Municipality are linked by the same origin: lake, river, township, municipality.

The term "Franquelin" was used in memory of Jean-Baptiste-Louis Franquelin was born in Villebernin in Bourgogne French in 1650. He arrived in New France in 1671. He operated "a priori" the fur trade. He got involved in cartography, at the request of Louis de Buade de Frontenac in 1674; the latter was a native of the same region of Palluau, in France.

In 1683, Franquelin drew up the plans for haute and basse-ville de Québec. In 1687, he taught navigation in the city Quebec as part of his function as royal hydrographer. From 1689 to 1691, he practiced the profession of engineer and drew up in particular the plans of the royal battery of Quebec. Among the fifty cards which are recognized to him, the most notorious are those which:

- illustrate the observations of Jolliet during his exploration on the river Mississippi in 1673 and
- describe Louisiana through the discoveries of Cavelier de La Salle.

In 1694, he returned to France in 1694 where he continued his career until his death after 1712.

The toponym "Franquelin River" was formalized on December 5, 1968, at the Place Names Bank of the Commission de toponymie du Québec.

== See also ==
- Estuary of Saint Lawrence
- Zec des Rivières-Godbout-et-Mistassini
- List of rivers of Quebec
