= Chute-aux-Outardes =

- Village municipality
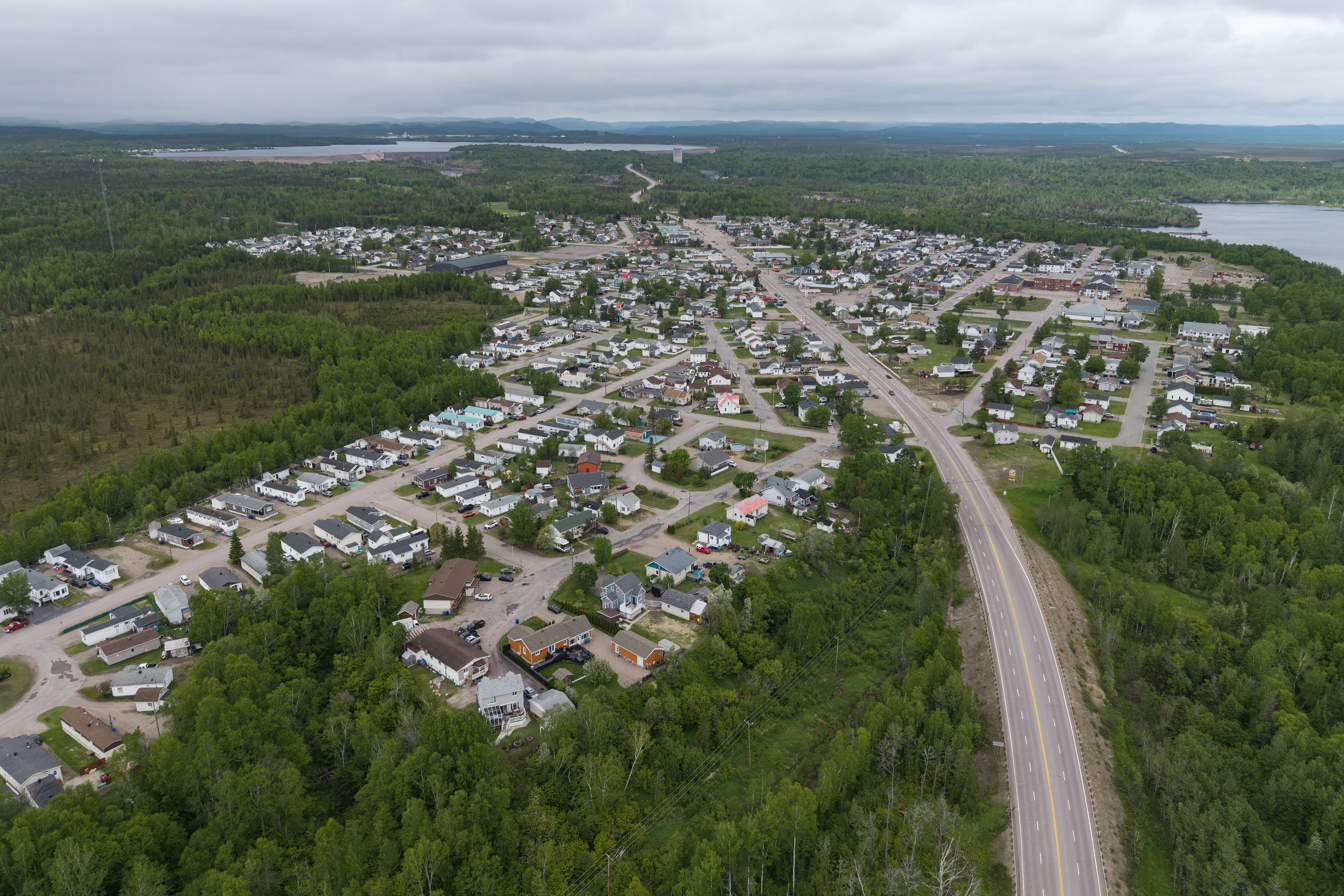

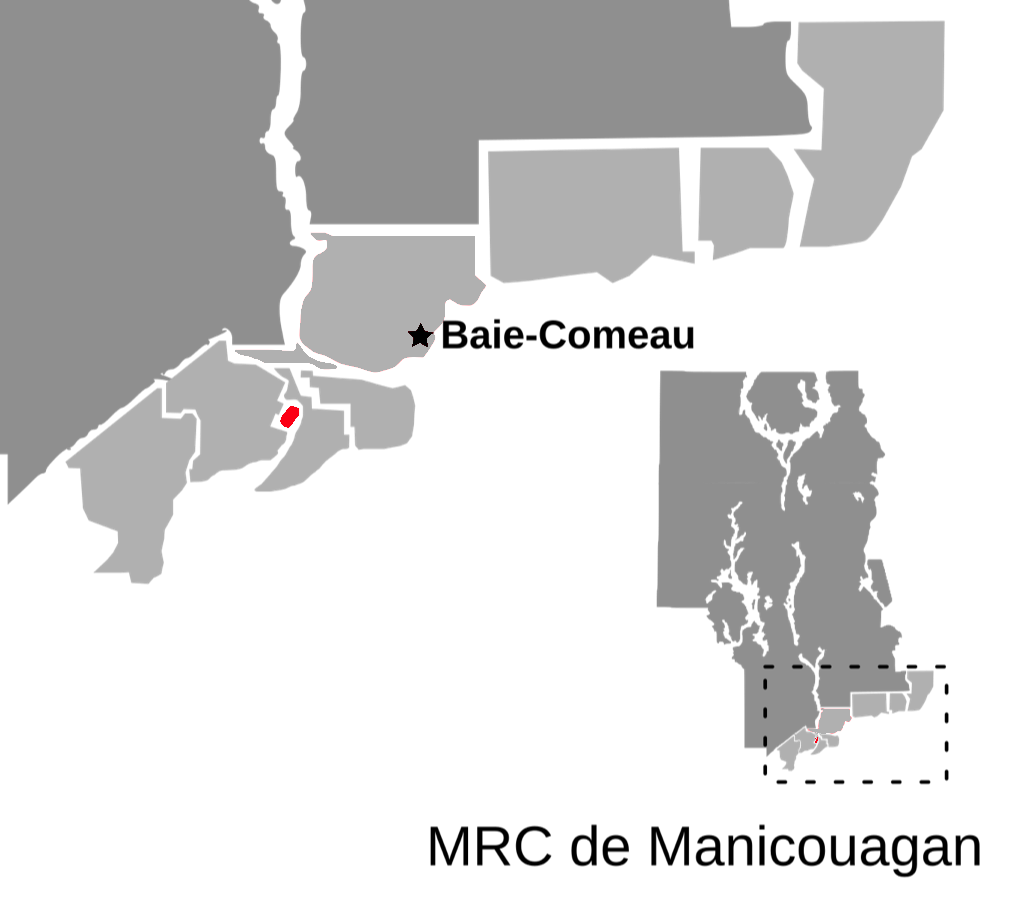
- Map of RCM with Chute-aux-Outardes highlighted

- Location in Côte-Nord region of Quebec
- Coordinates: 49°07′N 68°24′W
- Country: Canada
- Province: Quebec
- Region: Côte-Nord
- RCM: Manicouagan
- Constituted: March 7, 1951

Government
  - Mayor: Christian Malouin
  - Federal riding: Côte-Nord—Kawawachikamach—Nitassinan
  - Prov. riding: René-Lévesque

Area
  - Total: 9.76 km^{2} (3.77 sq mi)
  - Land: 7.51 km^{2} (2.90 sq mi)

Population (2021)
  - Total: 1,391
  - Density: 185.3/km^{2} (480/sq mi)
  - Pop (2016-21): ▼11%
  - Dwellings: 731
- Time zone: UTC−5 (EST)
  - Summer (DST): UTC−4 (EDT)
- Postal code(s): G0H 1C0
- Area codes: 418 and 581
- Highways: R-138
- MAMH code: 96035
- Toponymie info: 13494
- Website: www.municipalitecao.ca

Chute-aux-Outardes (French pronunciation: [ʃyt oz‿utaʁd]) is a village municipality in Quebec, Canada, at the mouth of the Outardes River. It is about 20 kilometres (12 mi) south-west of Baie-Comeau along Route 138.

== Demographics ==
In the 2021 Census of Population conducted by Statistics Canada, Chute-aux-Outardes had a population of 1,391 living in 693 of its 731 total private dwellings, a change of −11% from its 2016 population of 1,563. With a land area of 7.51 km^{2} (2.90 sq mi), it had a population density of 185.2/km^{2} (479.7/sq mi) in 2021.

Historical census populations – Chute-aux-Outardes

Year	Pop.	±%
1951	648	—
1956	923	+42.4%
1961	1,336	+44.7%
1966	1,921	+43.8%
1971	1,930	+0.5%

Year	Pop.	±%
1976	2,103	+9.0%
1981	2,280	+8.4%
1986	2,219	−2.7%
1991	2,162	−2.6%
1996	2,155	−0.3%

Year	Pop.	±%
2001	1,968	−8.7%
2006	1,853	−5.8%
2011	1,644	−11.3%
2016	1,563	−4.9%
2021	1,391	−11.0%

Source: Statistics Canada

Mother tongue (2021):

- English as first language: 0.4%
- French as first language: 99.6%
- English and French as first language: 0%
- Other as first language: 0%

== Education ==
Centre de services scolaire de l'Estuaire operates francophone public schools, including:

- École Richard

The Eastern Shores School Board operates anglophone public schools, including:

- Baie Comeau High School in Baie-Comeau
