= Outre-Mer (disambiguation) =

Outre-Mer is an 1830s prose collection by American poet Henry Wadsworth Longfellow.

Outre-Mer may also refer to:

- Outre Mer, a 2005 album by Garage A Trois
- Outre-Mers (journal), a French journal
- Outre-Mer - Impressions of America, an 1895 work by Paul_Bourget
- Overseas France, the French-administered territories outside Europe
- The 12th-century Crusader states, also called Outremer
- The French catamaran manufacturer Outremer; see Marc Van Peteghem

== See also ==
- Outré (disambiguation)
