= Napoléon-Alexandre Comeau =

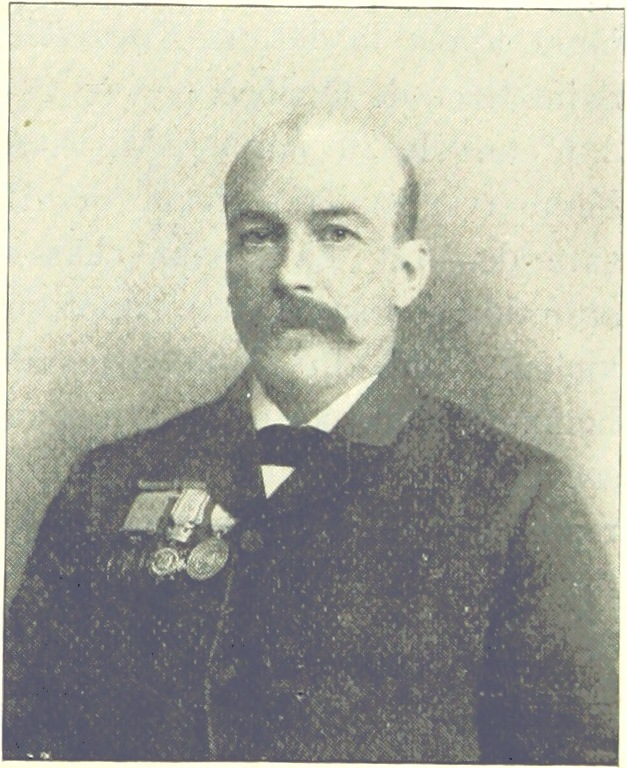
Napoléon-Alexandre Comeau

Napoléon-Alexandre Comeau (May 11, 1848 – November 17, 1923) was a self-taught naturalist and Canadian government official. The city of Baie-Comeau, Quebec, is named after him, as well as this city's history museum building.

He was born in Les Îlets-Jérémie (located in the municipality of Colombier), not far from Betsiamites on the North Shore of the Saint Lawrence River. He was the eldest of eleven children. His father, Antoine-Alexandre Comeau, was an employee of the Hudson's Bay Company. His mother, Mary Luce Hall-Bedard, was of Irish origin. Napoleon-Alexandre Comeau spent his childhood in the woods in Labrador, at North-West River and the Mingan Islands, along with the Innu and Inuit, who taught him to hunt, fish and navigate.

As a teenager, he spoke fluent French, Montagnais, Naskapi and Inuktitut. In 1859 he was sent to an English school in Trois-Rivières, where he learned to read, write and speak English.

== Life and career ==
In 1860, Napoléon-Alexandre Comeau joined his father in Trinity Bay. His father appointed him, at fourteen, "guardian of the Godbout River". This, one of the 116 salmon rivers in Quebec, is a fishing area, and was then the private property of William Agar Adamson. Comeau retained this position throughout his life. He completed his training through the library. With Ashini Montagnais hunters, he learns the hatch and deepens his knowledge of the fauna and flora.

He worked for 15 years as a trapper. He married Marie Antoinette Labrie on June 14, 1871. In 1877 he was appointed postmaster at Godbout. He became the assistant coroner (even practicing medicine, he attended the births of more than 250 newborns), before becoming, in 1879, Superintendent of Fisheries for the Canadian government.

In 1883, he became a telegraph operator in Godbout. In January 1886, following the rescue of his wife's brothers, Alfred and Francois Labrie on the Saint Lawrence River, during which he traveled 60 km on the ice, he and his brother Isaiah were decorated by the Canadian government.

In 1888, his wife Antoinette died of cancer. Comeau, who had no children from his first marriage, remarried in 1889, marrying his wife's sister, Victoria Labrie, who gave him 12 children.

He was invited by Dr. Stevenson and Dr. Ahearn to stay at the Jeffrey Hale Hospital in Quebec City, to his knowledge.

Napoléon-Alexandre Comeau died on November 17, 1923, in Godbout, where a monument was dedicated to his memory in 1927, with the text: "Humble child of the North, he learned to read with authority in the great book of nature while serving his people and his country." There is a copy of this monument in Charlesbourg. His house is called "Castle Comeau". In 1998, Canada Post issued a stamp to mark the 150th anniversary of his birth.

== Naturalist ==
From 1882, Napoleon-Alexandre Comeau developed a friendship with naturalists Elliott Coues and Hart Merriam, of the Smithsonian Institution. Comeau gave them a list of birds beyond North Shore, which was published in the Bulletin of the Madison Nutall Ornithology Club in 1882, and in the journal The Auk, in July 1884 and provided them with bird specimens. He also took many photographs, most of which have been lost.

That same year 1882, he became a member of the American Ornithological Union in New York before going to hunt buffalo in Wyoming with Baron Ernest de la Grange. On March 6, 1883, he delivered a lecture before the Geographical Society of Quebec, entitled "The physical geography of the northern part of the province of Quebec." The same year he collaborated with the prestigious American magazine Forest and Stream.

In 1914, he collaborated on a study by the Canadian government on fisheries in the Arctic and the tourism potential of the Hudson Bay. Five years later he helped found the Provancher Society of Natural History.

== Works by Comeau ==
- Comeau, Napoleon A. (1909). Life and sport on the north shore of the lower St. Lawrence and Gulf: containing chapters on salmon fishing, trapping, the folk-lore of the Montagnais Indians and tales of adventure on the fringe of the Labrador Peninsula (1st ed.). Quebec: Daily Telegraph Print. House.
- Comeau, Napoléon A. (1923). Life and sport on the North shore of the lower St. Lawrence and Gulf: containing chapters on salmon fishing, trapping, the folk-lore of the Montagnais Indians and tales of adventure on the fringe of the Labrador Peninsula (2nd ed.). Quebec: Telegraph Printing Company.

== General references ==
- Frenette, Pierre (2005). "Comeau, Napoleon-Alexandre (baptized Alexandre-Napoléon)". In Cook, Ramsay; Bélanger, Réal (eds.). Dictionary of Canadian Biography. Vol. XV (1921–1930) (online ed.). University of Toronto Press.
- Réjean Beaudin, « Napoléon-Alexandre Comeau. Le héros légendaire de la Côte-Nord », Editions XYZ, collection Les grandes figures, Montréal, February 16, 2006 ISBN 978-2-89261-459-6
- Victor-Alphonse Huard, Labrador et Anticosti, C.-O. Beauchemin & Fils, Montréal, 1897.
- Revue d’histoire de la Côte-Nord, no 25–26, 1997.
- Pauline L. Boileau, La Côte-Nord contre vents et marées Septentrion.
- Yves Thériault, « Roi de la Côte-Nord (La vie extraordinaire de Napoléon-Alexandre Comeau) », Éditions de l’homme, 1960.
