= Lac de la Rivière aux Anglais =

Lake in Quebec, Canada

- Location within Quebec
- Location: Rivière-aux-Outardes, Manicouagan Regional County Municipality, Côte-Nord, Quebec, Canada
- Coordinates: 49°16′49″N 68°09′22″W
- Primary inflows: (clockwise from the mouth)
- Primary outflows: Rivière aux Anglais
- Basin countries: Canada
- Max. length: 0.8 kilometres (0.50 mi)
- Max. width: 0.48 kilometres (0.30 mi)
- Surface elevation: 49 metres (161 ft)
- Settlements: Baie-Comeau

The lac de la Rivière aux Anglais (English: Lake of the English River) is a freshwater body of the watershed of rivière aux Anglais, flowing in the unorganized territory of Rivière-aux-Outardes, in the Manicouagan Regional County Municipality, in the administrative region of Côte-Nord, in the province from Quebec, to Canada.

The surroundings of Rivière aux Anglais lake are served by a few forest roads connecting from the south to the Rivière aux Anglais path.

Forestry and hydroelectricity are the main economic activity around the lake.

== Geography ==
The lac de la Rivière aux Anglais is located in the eastern part of the territory of the town of Baie-Comeau. This lake crossed to the southeast by the rivière aux Anglais, has a length of 0.8 km (0.50 mi), a maximum width of 0.48 km (0.30 mi) and an altitude of 49 m (161 ft). It has three islands. This lake is formed by the dam erected at its mouth. The cliff on the east side of the lake stretches the entire length of the lake. A mountain peak (altitude: 223 m (732 ft) is located 0.8 km (0.50 mi) northeast of the lake shore. Mont Tibasse (altitude: 169 m (554 ft) is located at 0.5 km (0.31 mi) on the west side.

From the mouth of the lac de la Rivière aux Anglais, the current descends on 2.9 km (1.8 mi) generally towards the south-east, following the course of the rivière aux Anglais, in particular by passing at the end of the segment on the north side of an industrial sector in the eastern part of Baie-Comeau, to discharge onto the west shore of Baie aux Anglais, on the north shore of the estuary of Saint Lawrence.

== Toponym ==
The toponym "Lac de la Rivière aux Anglais" derives from the name of the river.

The toponym "Lac de la Rivière aux Anglais" was formalized on August 2, 1974, at the Place Names Bank of the Commission de toponymie du Québec.

== See also ==
- Gulf of St. Lawrence, a stream
- List of rivers of Quebec
