= Les Îlets-Jérémie =

- Unincorporated hamlet
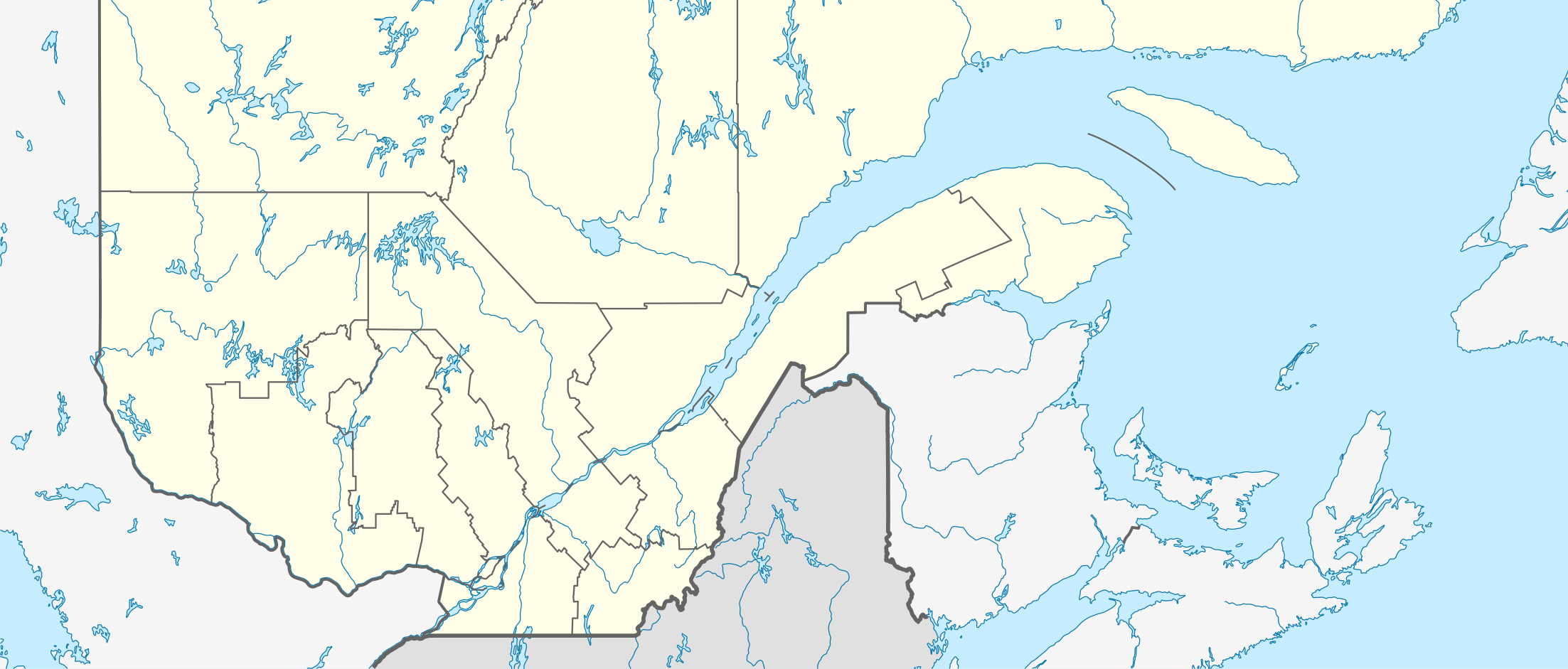
- Location within Quebec South
- Coordinates: 48°52′50″N 68°47′41″W
- Country: Canada
- Province: Quebec
- Region: Côte-Nord
- RCM: La Haute-Côte-Nord
- Municipality: Colombier
- Established: 17th-century
- Time zone: UTC-5 (EST)
  - Summer (DST): UTC-4 (EDT)
- Postal code: G0H 1P0
- Area codes: 418, 581, 367

Les Îlets-Jérémie (French pronunciation: [lez‿ilɛ ʒeʁemi]) is a settlement in the municipality of Colombier in the Côte-Nord region of the Canadian province of Quebec. Located on the north shore of the St. Lawrence River, the small community is named after the Jérémie Islets (French: Îlets Jérémie) that are just off its shores and mark the western end of the Jérémie Islets Bay (French: baie des Îlets-Jérémie). The Innu call the hamlet Ishkuamishkut, meaning "where one expects polar bear". Its trading post was once considered as the best trading post on the North Shore.

The islets were named in turn after a certain Noël Jérémie, or Lamontagne, who was born between 1629 and 1638, and died between 1694 and 1697. Around 1660, he established a trading and fishing company. In 1673, the first reference was made to the Îlets-Jérémie Post (later on also written as Îlets-à-Jérémie or Îlets-de-Jérémie) by François de Crespieul. That year, Noël Jérémie was a clerk at the Tadoussac post, but he often went to the islands with his son Nicolas to conduct fur trade with the Innu of Betsiamites and vicinity. Nicolas became an interpreter and clerk of the Hudson's Bay Company, and wrote Relation du Détroit de la Baie d'Hudson, published in 1720. He died at Quebec City in 1732.

After periodic closures, the post became the property of the North West Company in 1802, that obtained a 20-year lease of the posts in the King's Domain. When the North West Company (NWC) and the Hudson's Bay Company (HBC) merged in 1821, it was operated by the HBC for one year until the original NWC lease expired. The renewal of the 20-year lease was awarded to John Goudie, the highest bidder, but in 1831, the HBC reacquired the King's Posts by buying the lease from William Lampson. From 1849 to 1854, the post (spelled over time as Iles Jérémie, Islets-de-Jeremie, Isle de Jeremie, Ile-Jeremie, Isle Jeremie, and Jeremie's Post) was the administrative headquarters for all the King's Posts. It closed permanently in 1859 when the lease was terminated, and HBC operations were transferred to Betsiamites.

The community on the mainland has existed at least since 1735 when the Saint Anne chapel was first built. French Jesuit Jean-Baptiste de la Brosse (1724–1782) taught the local Innu reading and writing skills in their own language. Consequently, the Innu of Les Îlets-Jérémie adopted the Latin script and exhibited an unexpected degree of literacy in the 18th century. A new chapel was built in 1765, that had disappeared by the end of the 19th-century. Its altar and other relics were rediscovered in the 1920s, and were housed in a new chapel, built in 1939 and modeled after the one in Tadoussac.

== Notable people ==
- Napoléon-Alexandre Comeau, naturalist, was born there in 1846.
