= Loutre =

Loutre may refer to:

== Place names ==
- Saint-Cirgues-la-Loutre, a French commune in the department of Corrèze in the Limousin region
- La Loutre Dam, the original dam on the Gouin Reservoir built in 1916–1917 on the Saint-Maurice River in Quebec, Canada
- Lac à la Loutre (Rivière-aux-Outardes), a freshwater body at the head of rivière aux Anglais in Quebec, Canada
- Rivière à la Loutre (Gouffre River tributary), in Capitale-Nationale, Quebec, Canada

== Individuals ==
- Abbot Jean-Louis Le Loutre, 18th century French military leader directing battles of the Anglo-Micmac war, in Acadia, in Canada
