= Franquelin, Quebec =

Franquelin
- Municipality
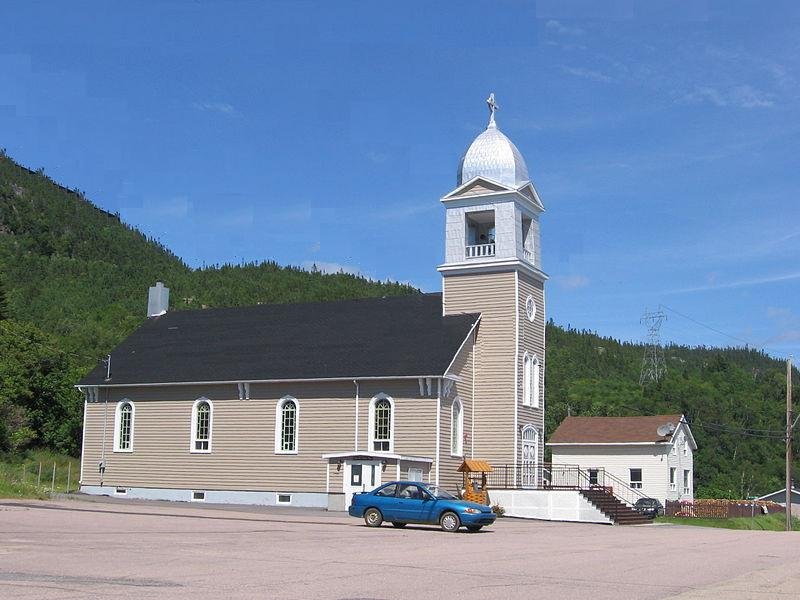

- Location in Côte-Nord region of Quebec
- Coordinates: 49°17′36″N 67°53′53″W
- Country: Canada
- Province: Quebec
- Region: Côte-Nord
- RCM: Manicouagan
- Settled: 1910s
- Constituted: January 1, 1978

Government
  - Mayor: Steeve Grenier
  - Federal riding: Côte-Nord—Kawawachikamach—Nitassinan
  - Prov. riding: René-Lévesque

Area
  - Total: 527.99 km^{2} (203.86 sq mi)
  - Land: 436.55 km^{2} (168.55 sq mi)

Population (2021)
  - Total: 285
  - Density: 0.7/km^{2} (1.8/sq mi)
  - Pop (2016-21): ▼8.9%
  - Dwellings: 194
- Time zone: UTC−5 (EST)
  - Summer (DST): UTC−4 (EDT)
- Postal code(s): G0H 1E0
- Area codes: 418 and 581
- Highways: R-138

Franquelin (French pronunciation: [fʁɑ̃klɛ̃]) is a municipality in Quebec, Canada, in the administrative region of Côte-Nord in RCM Manicouagan. Its population is 285 people over 430 square kilometres. Franquelin was founded at the foot of Massifs rocks of the Laurentians where impressive cliffs plunge to the Gulf of Saint Lawrence.

== History ==
The geographic township of Franquelin was created in 1911, and named in honour of Jean-Baptiste-Louis Franquelin, the first official cartographer of New France. He drew the map of the St. Lawrence River in 1685.

Franquelin came into existence in 1911 thanks to the forest industry. The lumber would be transported to the rivers by horses. From there, it was shipped to paper mills in Thorold, Ontario, and then to Baie-Comeau starting in 1937. The Ontario Paper Company, owned by Colonel Robert R. McCormick, which later became the Quebec North Shore Paper Co., needed paper to supply the Chicago Tribune and the New York Daily News, which were also owned by McCormick.

The village was also called Bec-Scie in the past, as well as Baie-des-Cèdres, the name given to the local post office between 1920 and 1928. On January 1, 1978, the place was incorporated as a municipality when it split off from the United Township Municipality of Les Sept-Cantons-Unis-du-Saguenay.

== Demographics ==
Historical census populations – Franquelin, Quebec

Year	Pop.	±%
1976	456	—
1981	388	−14.9%
1986	339	−12.6%
1991	367	+8.3%
1996	391	+6.5%

Year	Pop.	±%
2001	378	−3.3%
2006	346	−8.5%
2011	324	−6.4%
2016	313	−3.4%
2021	285	−8.9%

Source: Statistics Canada

Private dwellings occupied by usual residents (2021): 157 (total dwellings: 194)

Mother tongue (2021):

- English as first language: 0%
- French as first language: 98.2%
- English and French as first language: 1.8%
- Other as first language: 0%

== See also ==
- Franquelin River
- Rivière Franquelin Branche Ouest, un cours d'eau, un cours d'eau
- Bouchard River
- Ma Tante River
- Thompson River
