= Rivière aux Anglais =

Location
- Country: Canada
- Province: Quebec
- Region: Côte-Nord
- MRC: Manicouagan Regional County Municipality
- City: Baie-Comeau

Physical characteristics
- Source: Lac à la Loutre
  - location: Rivière-aux-Outardes
  - coordinates: 49°31′23″N 68°17′02″W
  - elevation: 304 m (997 ft)
- Mouth: Baie des Anglais, Estuary of Saint Lawrence
  - location: Baie-Comeau
  - coordinates: 49°15′24″N 68°08′01″W
  - elevation: 2 m (6.6 ft)
- Length: 64.9 km (40.3 mi)

Basin features
- Tributaries
  - left: (upstream) outlet of two lakes (via the Lac de la Rivière aux Anglais), outlet of Lake Éthier, outlet of Borne Lake (via the Unknown Lake), Larouche stream, rivière des Trois Pointes (via the Lac des Trois Pointes and the Lac La Chesnaye)), discharge from lakes Thomas and Gabriel, four discharges from unidentified lakes, Tremblay River, discharge from two lakes, Françoise River, discharge from two lakes, discharge from a lake (via lac Pascal), discharge from a lake, discharge from two lakes (via Lac à la Loutre), discharge from a lake (via Lac à la Loutre), three discharges from lakes (via Lac à la Loutre), outlet of Lac Paul (via Lac Savard).
  - right: (upstream) outlet of Lake Léon, outlet of a lake (via Lac La Chesnaye), outlet of Lac Sans Baie (via Lac La Chesnaye), outlet of Lac Croche (via Le Lac La Chesnaye), outlet of two small lakes (via an unidentified lake), Épinette River (via Lac Fer à Cheval), discharge from two small lakes (via Lac Fer à Cheval), Bacon stream, discharge from Lake Toboggan, discharge from an unidentified lake, Brisson River, discharge from an unidentified lake, discharge from four lakes, discharge from a set of lakes (via Lake Pascal), discharge from a set of lakes (via Lac à la Loutre), discharge of a set of lakes (via Lac à la Loutre), release of two small lakes (via Lac à la Loutre), discharge of a set of lakes (via Baie de la Passe and Baie Le Pouce), discharge from two small lakes (via Savard Lake).

The rivière aux Anglais (French pronunciation: [ʁivjɛʁ oz‿ɑ̃ɡlɛ], lit. 'River of the Englishmen') is a tributary of the St. Lawrence River, flowing in the unorganized territory Rivière-aux-Outardes and in the territory of the town Baie-Comeau, in the Manicouagan Regional County Municipality, on the administrative region of Côte-Nord, in the province of Quebec, in Canada.

The rivière aux Anglais is a watercourse with salmons. At the beginning of 20th century, it had many lakes on its route.

The rivière aux Anglais valley is served mainly by "chemin de la rivière aux Anglais" and the lower part, by the route 138.

Forestry is the main economic activity in this valley.

The surface of the rivière aux Anglais is usually frozen from the beginning of December to the end of March, except the rapids areas; however, safe circulation on the ice is generally from mid-December to mid-March.

== Geography ==
This river rises on the Canadian Shield, from an unidentified lake (length: 0.7 km (0.43 mi); 395 m (1,296 ft)). This lake is located on the south side of Lac Blanc.

The watershed of this river is 445 km^{2} (172 sq mi) and its length is 64.9 km (40.3 mi) at its mouth east of the town of Baie-Comeau. It flows in an almost entirely forest environment and its flow is regulated by three hydraulic works belonging to the company Resolute Forest Products.

From the head lake, the course of the English river descends on 64.9 km (40.3 mi), with a drop of 393 m (1,289 ft), according to the following segments:

Upper course of the English river (segment of 24.6 km (15.3 mi))

- 4.2 km (2.6 mi) first west on 0.8 km (0.50 mi) down the cliff, then south in the marsh area, then crossing Savard Lake (length: 1.9 km (1.2 mi); altitude: 304 m (997 ft)), to its mouth. Note: Lac Savard receives the outlet (coming from the east) from Lac Paul;
- 7.6 km (4.7 mi) towards the south-east, in particular by crossing on 7.45 km (4.63 mi) the Lac à la Loutre (length: 8.0 km (5.0 mi); altitude: 304 m (997 ft)), to its mouth. Note: A village of around forty buildings is located at the mouth of Lac à la Loutre and downstream of the dam;
- 4.4 km (2.7 mi) to the east, relatively in a straight line, in particular crossing Lake Pascal (length: 4.0 km (2.5 mi); altitude: 289 m (948 ft)) over its full length, bending south at the end of the segment, to the confluence of the Françoise River (coming from the east);
- 8.4 km (5.2 mi) first towards the south-west, then towards the south-east in a deep valley, relatively in a straight line, up to a bend of the river corresponding to the confluence of the Tremblay River (coming from the southeast);

Intermediate course of the English river (segment of 29.1 km (18.1 mi))

- 2.2 km (1.4 mi) towards the south-west in a deep valley by collecting the Brisson River (coming from the north-west), crossing a series of rapids, then forming a hook towards the south, to a bend corresponding to the outlet (coming from the west) of a lake;
- 7.6 km (4.7 mi) towards the south-east by forming a loop towards the north to a bend in the river where the course is oriented towards the east by forming serpentines, up to a bend of river (corresponding to a stream coming from the north);
- 12.5 km (7.8 mi) towards the south-east by winding in a deep valley and collecting numerous streams, then crossing on 1.5 km (0.93 mi) the Fer à Cheval lake (length: 2.4 km (1.5 mi); altitude: 74 m (243 ft)), to its mouth. Note: The "Fer à Cheval lake" collects the Épinette River (coming from the west) via "Lac Cinq Cents";
- 1.2 km (0.75 mi) towards the northeast, in particular by crossing an unidentified lake (length: 1.1 km (0.68 mi); altitude: 73 m (240 ft)), up to at its mouth;
- 5.6 km (3.5 mi) to the east by crossing rapids, then crossing on 4.9 km (3.0 mi) the lac La Chesnaye (length: 5.8 km (3.6 mi); altitude: 63 m (207 ft)) where the current curves north to its mouth;

Lower course of the English river (segment of 11.2 km (7.0 mi))

- 1.9 km (1.2 mi) towards the east by collecting the Larouche stream (coming from the north), then curving towards the south crossing the Unknown lake (length: 1.1 km (0.68 mi); altitude: 58 m (190 ft)), to its mouth;
- 6.4 km (4.0 mi) to the south in a deep valley, crossing a small lake, collecting the discharge (coming from the east) from Lake Ethier, collecting the discharge (coming from the west) from Lac Léon, bending towards the south-east and crossing the Lac de la Rivière aux Anglais (length: 0.8 km (0.50 mi); altitude: 49 m (161 ft)), up to dam located at its mouth. Note: route 138 passes at the foot of this dam;
- 2.9 km (1.8 mi) towards the south-west with a drop in level of 47 m (154 ft) crossing several zones of rapids, until its mouth.

Its mouth spills out onto the west shore of the Baie des Anglais, on the north shore of the Estuary of Saint Lawrence, in the eastern part of the town of Baie-Comeau. This confluence is located on the north side of the facilities of the company Resolute Forest Products.

== Activities ==
The English river was used for sport fishing until 1983. From that date, fishing was prohibited in order to protect the habitat of Atlantic salmon. Part of it is declared a salmon sanctuary.

Part of the river is diverted to Lac à la Chasse thanks to the facilities of the Resolute Forest Products paper mill. This lake is used to supply process and domestic water to the paper mill and the aluminum smelter Alcoa. The aluminum smelter then supplies the cereal Cargill and until August 2018 the Saint-George district. The Lac à La Chasse feeds until July 2018 the eastern sector of the town of Baie-Comeau, namely the Sainte-Amélie and Saint-Nom-de-Marie districts. The paper mill also supplied part of the Sainte-Amélie district. All residents of Baie-Comeau are now supplied by the new water treatment plant built in 2018 which draws its water from the Manicouagan River.

== Toponym ==
The toponym "Rivière aux Anglais" was formalized on August 2, 1974, at the Place Names Bank of the Commission de toponymie du Québec.

== See also ==
- List of rivers of Quebec
