= Rivière à la Loutre (Témiscamingue) =

- Location of mouth. Rivière à la Loutre (Témiscamingue) (Quebec) Rivière à la Loutre (Témiscamingue) (Canada)

Location
- Country: Canada
- Province: Quebec
- Region: Abitibi-Témiscamingue
- Regional County Municipality: Témiscamingue Regional County Municipality

Physical characteristics
- Source: Lac de l'Argentier (ex-Lake d'Argent)
  - location: Fugèreville
  - coordinates: 47°17′00″N 79°08′05″W
  - elevation: 292 m (958 ft)
- Mouth: Lake Timiskaming
  - location: Saint-Bruno-de-Guigues
  - coordinates: 47°31′12″N 79°28′58″W
  - elevation: 172 m (564 ft)
- Length: 57.4 km (35.7 mi)

Basin features
- Progression: Lake Timiskaming— Ottawa River→ St. Lawrence River→ Gulf of St. Lawrence

The rivière à la Loutre (English: Otter River) is a tributary of the upper part of the Ottawa River. Rivière à la Loutre crosses the territory of the municipalities of Fugèreville and Saint-Bruno-de-Guigues, in the regional county municipality (MRC) of Témiscamingue, in Abitibi-Témiscamingue, in Quebec, in Canada.

== Geography ==
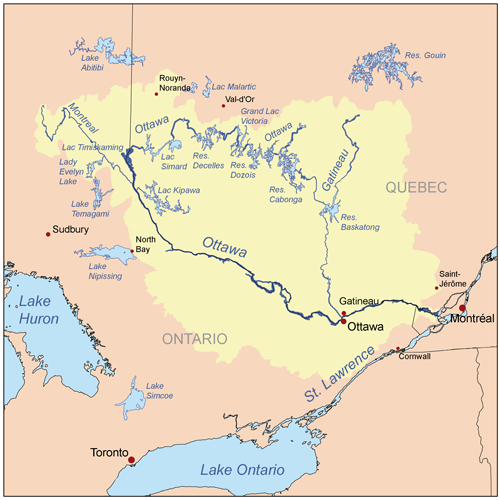
Watershed of the Ottawa River.

The neighboring watersheds of the Rivière à la Loutre are:

- north side: Lake Timiskaming;
- east side: Laverlochère River, Cameron stream;
- south side: Lac Témiscamingue, Ottawa River, l'Africain stream;
- west side: lac Témiscamingue.

The main tributary of the Rivière à la Loutre is the Laverlochère River (coming from the east).

Lac d'Argent (formerly Lac d'Argent) (altitude: 292 m (958 ft)) constitutes the head lake of Rivière à la Loutre. ”It is located west of Lac Brisebois and west of the village of Ville-Marie.

From Lac d'Argent, the Rivière à la Loutre flows on 8.1 km (5.0 mi) west, then north, to the south shore of Lac des Douze, which the current crosses on 2.1 km (1.3 mi) to the north; then 4.8 km (3.0 mi) north to the mouth of the Laverdochère river (coming from the north); then, 21.2 km (13.2 mi) (or 12.9 km (8.0 mi) in a direct line) westward, forming several small coils, until the outlet of a stream coming from the south; then 12.8 km (8.0 mi) (or 9.0 km (5.6 mi) in a direct line) northward, forming several coils, to the discharge (coming from the north) of Deep Lake (altitude: 222 m (728 ft)); then 8.4 km (5.2 mi) west and north, up to its mouth.

Along its course, the Rivière à la Loutre collects several agricultural streams and passing just south of the village of Fugèreville. Its mouth is located at 229 m (751 ft) of altitude in the sixth rang of Fugèreville. The river flows into Paulson Bay, on the east shore of Lake Timiskaming, on the Ottawa River.

== Toponymy ==
The toponym Rivière à la Loutre was made official on December 5, 1968, at the Commission de toponymie du Québec.

== See also ==
- List of rivers of Quebec
