= Godbout, Quebec =

Godbout
- Village municipality
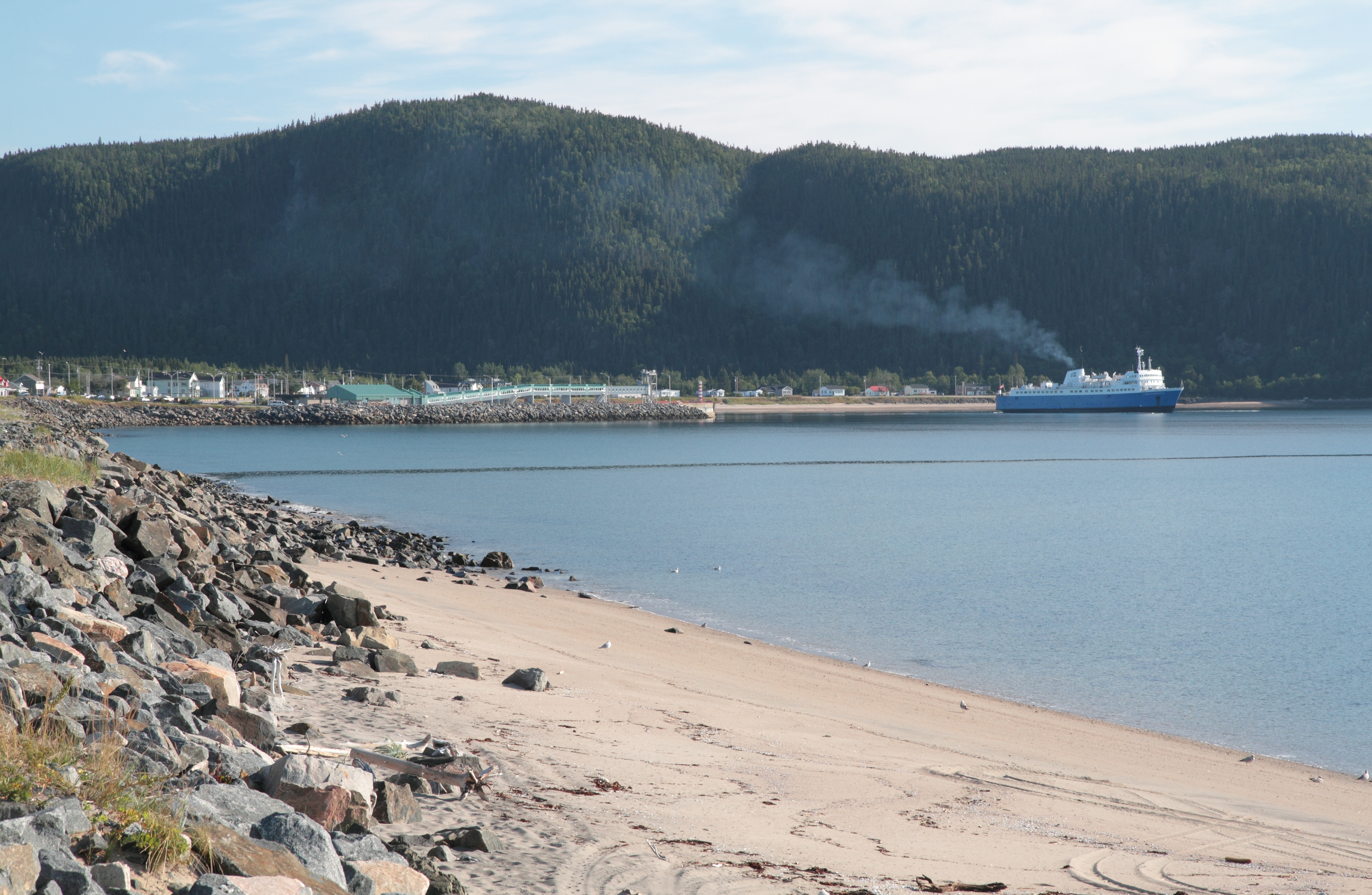
- Motto: Viens y voir
- Location in Côte-Nord region of Quebec
- Coordinates: 49°19′N 67°36′W
- Country: Canada
- Province: Quebec
- Region: Côte-Nord
- RCM: Manicouagan
- Settled: 1684 (trading post)
- Constituted: January 1, 1955

Government
  - Mayor: Guy Côté
  - Federal riding: Côte-Nord—Kawawachikamach—Nitassinan
  - Prov. riding: René-Lévesque

Area
  - Total: 204.37 km^{2} (78.91 sq mi)
  - Land: 161.60 km^{2} (62.39 sq mi)

Population (2021)
  - Total: 272
  - Density: 1.7/km^{2} (4.4/sq mi)
  - Pop (2016-21): ▲2.6%
  - Dwellings: 241
- Time zone: UTC−5 (EST)
  - Summer (DST): UTC−4 (EDT)
- Postal code(s): G0H 1G0
- Area codes: 418 and 581
- Highways: R-138
- MAMH code: 96010
- CTQ code: 25711
- Website: municipalites-du-quebec.ca/godbout/

Godbout (French pronunciation: [ɡɔdbu]) is a village municipality in the Côte-Nord region of Quebec, Canada. It is located at the mouth of the Godbout River on the north shore of the St. Lawrence River.

Godbout is accessible via Quebec Route 138 and by ferry from Matane.

== Geography ==
A map of the Ecological regions of Quebec places the Gobout area in ecological region 5g "Hautes collines de Baie-Comeau—Sept-Îles", in the eastern fir/white birch domain of the boreal zone.

The Godbout River is known as one of the best of Quebec's salmon rivers and also holds speckled trout. About 70 kilometres (43 mi) of the river is managed by a zone d'exploitation contrôlée (managed use zone), the Zec des Rivières-Godbout-et-Mistassini. The downstream Cap-Nord section is owned by a private club, but the right to fish it may be obtained through an agreement with the ZEC.

The Petite-Rivière-Godbout Old Forest is about 4 kilometres (2.5 mi) northwest of the village of Godbou.

== History ==
The native Innu hunted and fished near the mouth of the river that they called "Eddy River". This stream was renamed in honour of Nicolas Godeboust (1634–1674), who served as navigator and river pilot along the North Shore before becoming a settler on Orléans Island in 1670. That same year, Jesuit missionary Charles Albanel made mention of the "Godebout River" where he had met an indigenous group from the Sept-Îles area, the Oumamioueks. And Jean-Baptiste-Louis Franquelin referred to this river as "Godebou" on his map of 1684.

In 1684, a fur trading post was established at the river, and then indigenous groups settled around the post. They remained along the coast, hunting on the gulf in the winter and salmon fishing during the summer, but for a part of autumn they returned into the forest. After 1720, the post gained importance due to the seal hunt. Seals were hunted not only for their meat, but also for the fat that was melted, put in barrels, and sold cheaply.

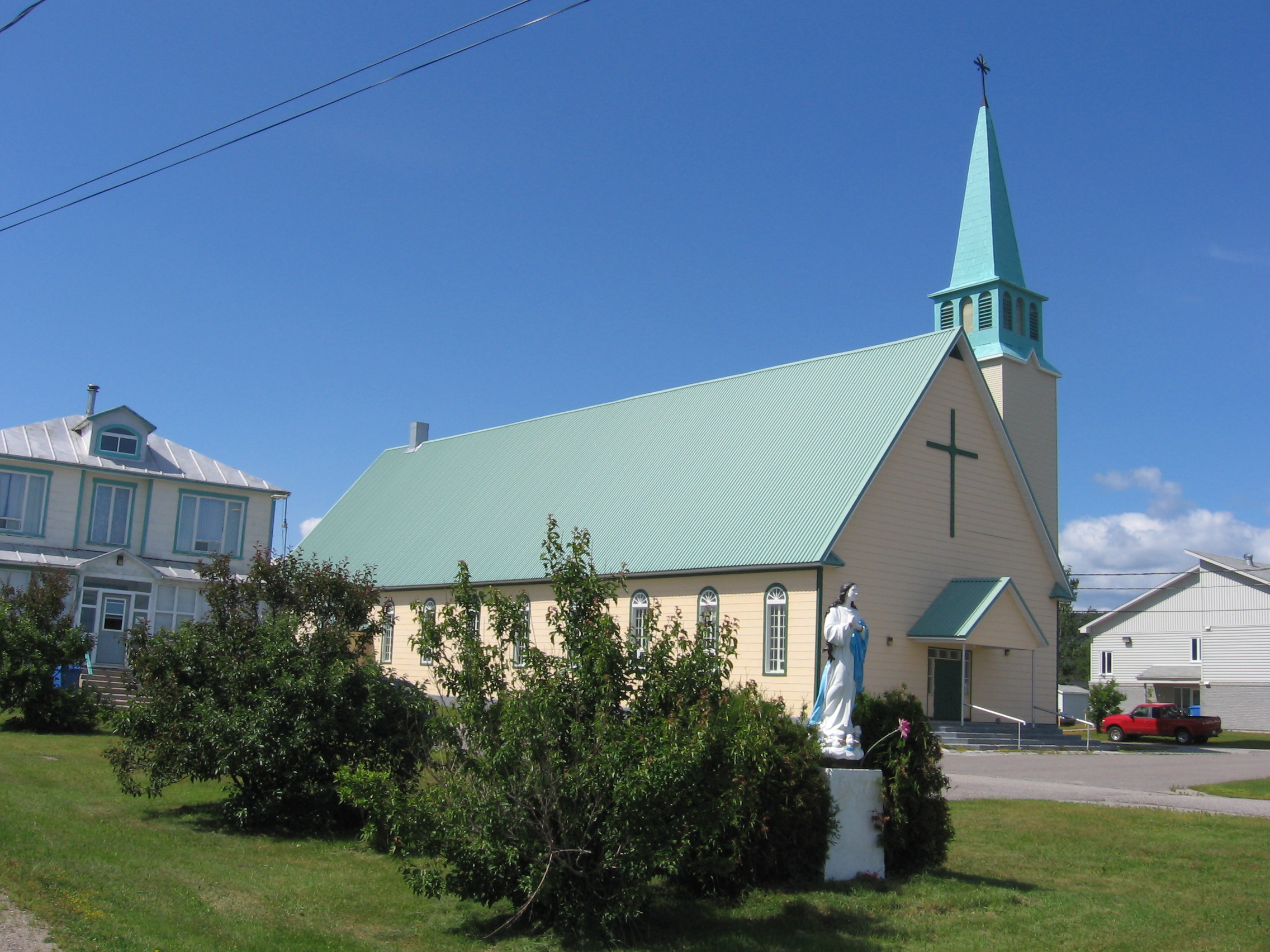
Godbout's church

Circa 1850, the Godbout region — from Pointe-des-Monts to Pointe à la Croix — counted up to twenty-five families of Innu seal hunters. But from 1860 onward, the French population really began to grow. At first, they were former employees of the trading post that by then was managed by the Hudson's Bay Company. First, a certain Théodule Savard, then the son of another employee, Napoléon-Alexandre Comeau, who moved to the village in his early teenage years. Comeau managed the salmon fishing and guarded against poachers. The Innu lost access to the river and were prevented from exercising their traditional subsistence fishing for salmon. Consequently, the indigenous population gradually decreased and at the end of the 19th century, few indigenous families remained and most had moved to the Betsiamites Reserve. In 1877, the Godbout Post Office opened. The place developed quickly when a forestry company, the St-Régis, started large scale logging operations in the interior forests. This led to new infrastructure such as a wharf, a dam, a log flume, and a network of roads to the various logging camps. In the village, it led to the construction of a hotel, shops, houses, a cookery, and a clinic. In 1926, the local parish was formed. In 1933, an attempt was made to set up a municipality but that was not realized until 1955.

In 1971, the St-Régis mill closed, leading to job loss and economic hardship in Godbout. The younger people would seek work elsewhere, resulting in some aging of the population. But this trend is somewhat reversed with the development of tourism in the area.

== Demographics ==
In the 2021 Census of Population conducted by Statistics Canada, Godbout had a population of 272 living in 157 of its 241 total private dwellings, a change of 2.6% from its 2016 population of 265. With a land area of 159.18 km^{2} (61.46 sq mi), it had a population density of 1.7/km^{2} (4.4/sq mi) in 2021.

Canada census – Godbout community profile

	2021	2016	2011
Population	272 (+2.6% from 2016)	265 (-11.1% from 2011)	298 (-17.5% from 2006)
Land area	159.18 km^{2} (61.46 sq mi)	161.60 km^{2} (62.39 sq mi)	161.34 km^{2} (62.29 sq mi)
Population density	1.7/km^{2} (4.4/sq mi)	1.6/km^{2} (4.1/sq mi)	1.8/km^{2} (4.7/sq mi)
Median age	62.8 (M: 63.2, F: 61.6)	60.1 (M: 60.3, F: 59.9)	58.0 (M: 58.4, F: 56.9)
Private dwellings	241 (total) 157 (occupied)	191 (total)	195 (total)
Median household income	$54,800	$40,320	$37,734

References: 2021 2016 2011

Historical Census Data - Godbout, Quebec

Year	Pop.	±%
1956	663	—
1961	824	+24.3%
1966	773	−6.2%
1971	653	−15.5%
1976	602	−7.8%
1981	533	−11.5%
1986	455	−14.6%

Year	Pop.	±%
1991	391	−14.1%
1996	390	−0.3%
2001	327	−16.2%
2006	361	+10.4%
2011	298	−17.5%
2016	265	−11.1%
2021	272	+2.6%

Source: Statistics Canada

Canada Census Mother Tongue - Godbout, Quebec
Census	Total	French			English			French & English			Other		
Year	Responses	Count	Trend	Pop %	Count	Trend	Pop %	Count	Trend	Pop %	Count	Trend	Pop %
2016	265	265	▼10.2%	100.00%	0	0.0%	0.00%	0	0.0%	0.00%	0	0.0%	0.00%
2011	295	295	▼10.6%	100.00%	0	0.0%	0.00%	0	0.0%	0.00%	0	▼100.0%	0.00%
2006	360	330	▲1.5%	91.67%	0	0.0%	0.00%	0	0.0%	0.00%	30	▲ n/a%	8.33%
2001	325	325	▼13.3%	100.00%	0	▼100.0%	0.00%	0	0.0%	0.00%	0	0.0%	0.00%
1996	385	375	n/a	97.40%	10	n/a	2.60%	0	n/a	0.00%	0	n/a	0.00%

== Economy ==
The Matane—Godbout ferry is the village's main employer, either through direct employment, or by creating business for nearby restaurants and caterers. Tourism also provides opportunities for outfitters by catering to salmon fishing and other seasonal outdoor activities.

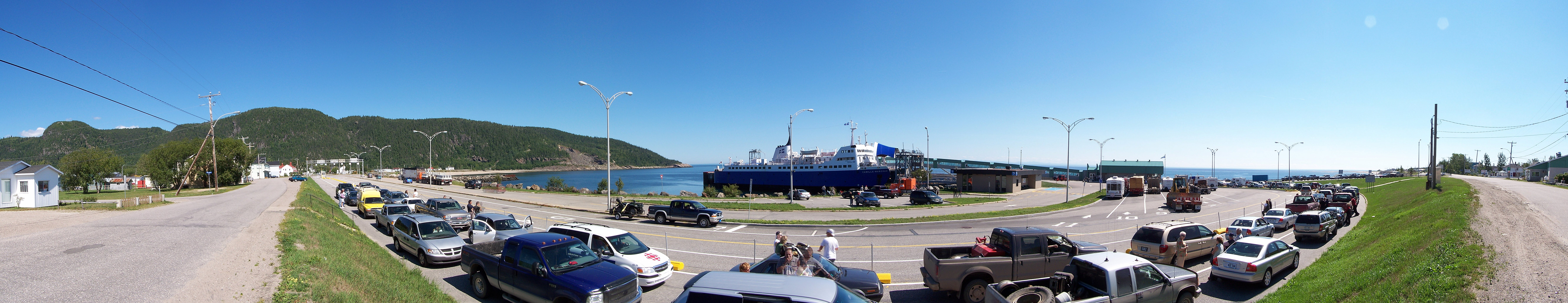
Panoramic view of Godbout's waterfront and ferry

== Local government ==
List of former mayors:

- Patrick Larocque (...–2009)
- Alain Labrie (2009–2013)
- Nicole Champagne (2013–2017)
- Jean-Yves Bouffard (2017–2023)
- Guy Côté (2023–present)

== See also ==
- Société des traversiers du Québec
