= Jean-Baptiste-Louis Franquelin =

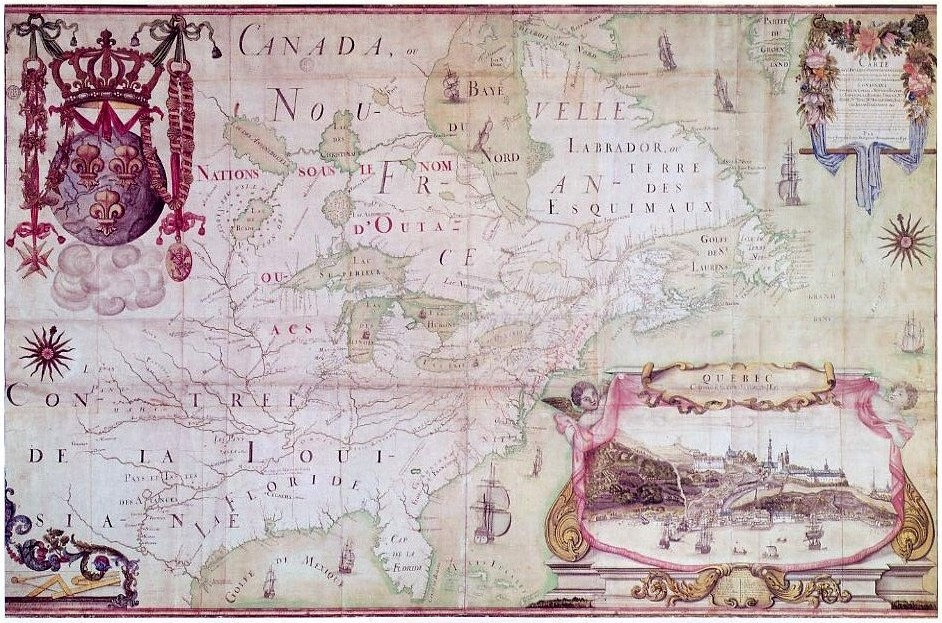
1688 Map of North America with a pictorial view of Quebec City by Franquelin

Jean-Baptiste-Louis Franquelin (French pronunciation: [ʒɑ̃ batist lwi fʁɑ̃klɛ̃]; 1650 – c.1712) was a French trader who was appointed in the early 1670s as the first cartographer in Nouvelle France (Canada) by the colony's governor. He was appointed in 1688 as a royal hydrographer by Louis XIV.

Franquelin was born in the commune of Pallauau-sur-Indre in central France. He migrated to New France in 1671 where he was soon appointed as the colony's cartographer. He documented a decade of Louis Jolliet and René-Robert Cavelier de La Salle's explorations in North America. He also completed other projects for the Crown and served the king's military engineer. After returning to France in 1692, he never lived in Canada again.

== Biography ==
Born at Saint-Michel de Villebernin, he grew up in the village in the small commune of Palluau-sur-Indre in central France. Having developed drawing and mapmaking skills, Franquelin migrated in 1671 from the Indre department to Nouvelle France (Quebec) to work as a trader.

New France Governor Louis de Buade de Frontenac soon recognized his talents and hired him to draw maps. Franquelin recorded the explorations of Louis Jolliet and René-Robert Cavelier de La Salle between 1674 and 1684. His 1684 map of Nouvelle France, including La Louisiane, became well known and served as the basis of maps by men from other countries.

In 1688 the King appointed Franquelin as royal hydrographer. He went to France in 1692 to complete a series of maps of the New England Atlantic coast, as the English and French were competing for control of territory in North America. He also continued to hold his appointment from New France from 1686 to 1697, and again from 1701 to 1703. But, from 1694 to 1707, he worked in France for Louis XIV's military engineer Vauban. Franquelin never returned to Canada.

He had married and had 13 children with his wife. She and ten of their children drowned in a shipwreck in 1693, near Sept-Iles, Quebec.

== Works (selection) ==
- Map of the Great Lakes
- Carte du grand fleuve St Laurens dressee et dessignee sur les memoires et observations que le Sr. Jolliet a tres exactement faites en barq: et en canot en 46 voyages pendant plusieurs années — Drawn with Louis Jolliet's collaboration
- Map of Louisiana, 1684 — See also Google's presentation.
- Carte de France septentrionale
- Maps on Wikimedia Commons

=== Lists of maps ===
- See Charbonneau, p. 46–52: 48 maps
- 34 maps at Newberry Library Cartographic Catalog

== Notes and references ==
- Burke-Gaffney, M. W. "Franquelin, Jean-Baptiste-Louis". In: Dictionary of Canadian Biography
- André Charbonneau. « Cartobibliographie de Jean-Baptiste-Louis Franquelin ». In: Papers of the Bibliographical Society of Canada, vol. 11, 1972, p. 39–52 (digital.library.mcgill.ca) — The list of maps is an attempt at exhaustivity.
- Biography at the Dictionary of Canadian Biography Online
- "Jean-Baptiste-Louis Franquelin". In: Canadian Encyclopedia
- Harrisse, H. (1872). Notes pour servir à l'histoire, à la bibliographie et à la cartographie de la Nouvelle-France et des pays adjacents, 1545–1700 (in French). Paris: Tross.
- Karel, David (1992). Dictionnaire des artistes de langue française en Amérique du Nord (in French). Presses de l'Université Laval, p. 314.
