= Rivière-aux-Outardes, Quebec =

Rivière-aux-Outardes
- Unorganized territory
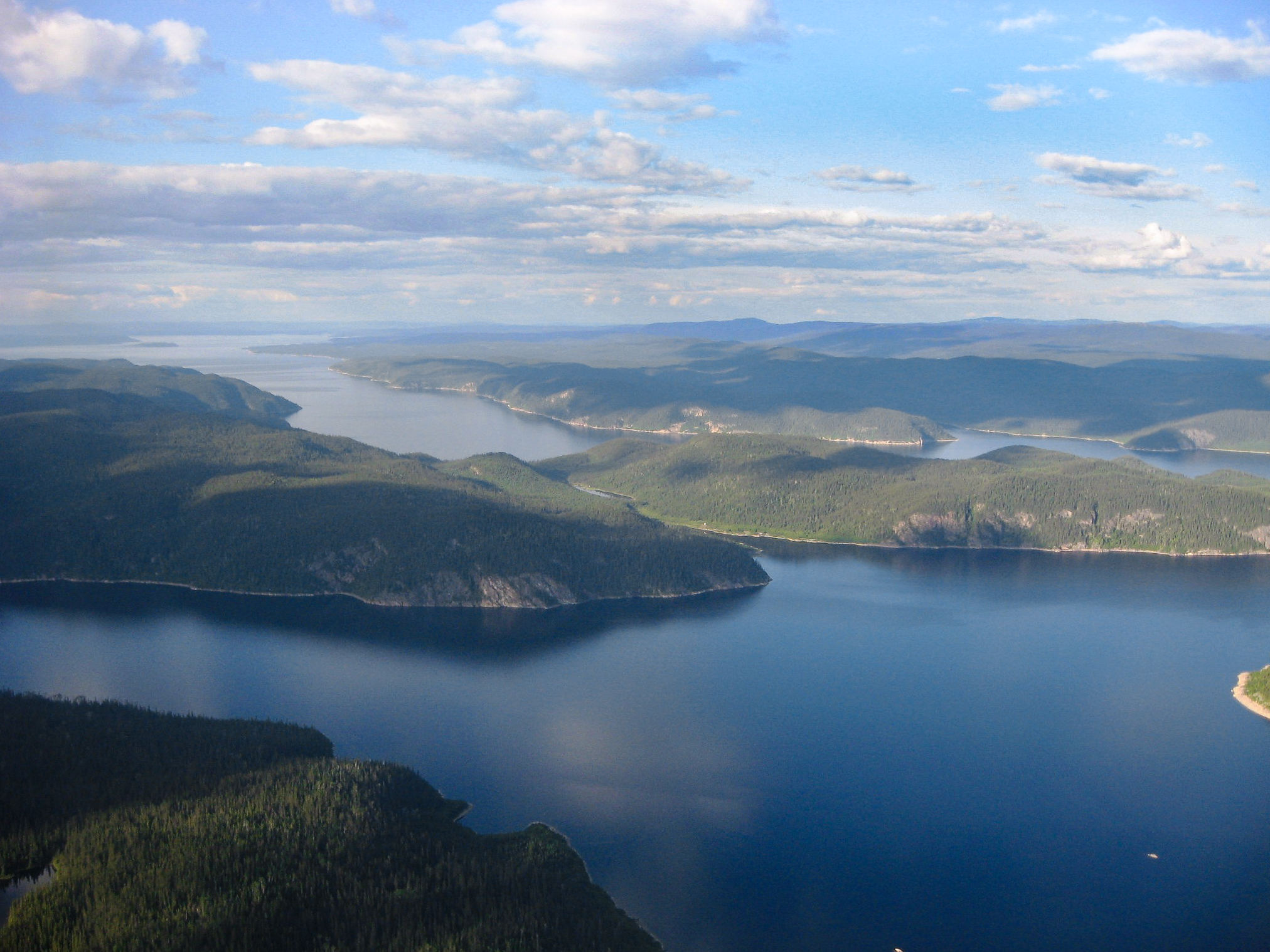
- René-Levasseur Island within Manicouagan Reservoir

- Location in Côte-Nord region of Quebec
- Coordinates: 50°15′N 69°00′W
- Country: Canada
- Province: Quebec
- Region: Côte-Nord
- RCM: Manicouagan
- Constituted: January 1, 1986

Government
  - Federal riding: Côte-Nord—Kawawachikamach—Nitassinan
  - Prov. riding: René-Lévesque

Area
  - Total: 37,576.14 km^{2} (14,508.23 sq mi)
  - Land: 32,713.75 km^{2} (12,630.85 sq mi)

Population (2021)
  - Total: 92
  - Density: 0/km^{2} (0/sq mi)
  - Pop (2016-21): ▼2.1%
  - Dwellings: 166
- Time zone: UTC−5 (EST)
  - Summer (DST): UTC−4 (EDT)
- Area codes: 418 and 581
- Highways: R-389

Rivière-aux-Outardes (French pronunciation: [ʁivjɛʁ oz‿utaʁd]) is an unorganized territory in the Côte-Nord region of Quebec, Canada. It makes up almost 95% of the Manicouagan Regional County Municipality.

The eponymous Outardes River is nearly 400 kilometres (250 mi) long, and flows through the territory in a north–south direction before draining into Outardes Bay at Ragueneau. The other major river in the territory is the Manicouagan River that flows parallel and east of the Outardes River. Both these rivers are developed with large-scale hydroelectric installations, part of the Manic-Outardes Project.

The Manicouagan Reservoir, a circular lake that covers the Manicouagan impact structure, is almost entirely located within the territory.

Quebec Route 389, running for a large part between the Outardes and Manicouagan Rivers, provides access to the territory and the hydroelectric installations along these rivers. It is an isolated highway with few roadside services that are great distances apart.

== Demographics ==
Historical census populations – Rivière-aux-Outardes, Quebec

Year	Pop.	±%
1986	20	—
1991	32	+60.0%
1996	59	+84.4%
2001	48	−18.6%

Year	Pop.	±%
2006	134	+179.2%
2011	86	−35.8%
2016	94	+9.3%
2021	92	−2.1%

Population counts are not adjusted for boundary changes.
Source: Statistics Canada

Private dwellings occupied by usual residents (2021): 56 (total dwellings: 166)

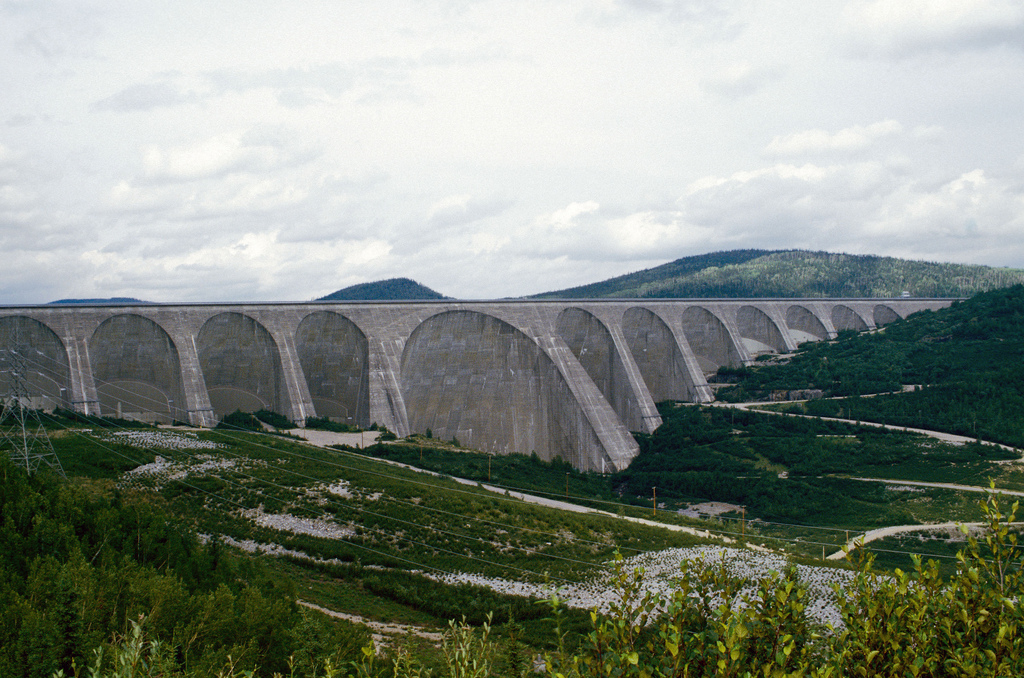
The Daniel-Johnson Dam impounds the Manicouagan Reservoir and fuels two power stations with a total capacity of almost 2600 MW.

== See also ==
- Franquelin River
- Rivière Franquelin Branche Ouest
- Lessard River (rivière Franquelin Branche Ouest)
