= Manicouagan Regional County Municipality =

Manicouagan
- Regional county municipality
- Coordinates: 49°13′N 68°09′W
- Country: Canada
- Province: Quebec
- Region: Côte-Nord
- Effective: April 1, 1981
- County seat: Baie-Comeau

Government
  - Type: Prefecture
  - Prefect: Guillaume Tremblay

Area
  - Total: 39,993.62 km^{2} (15,441.62 sq mi)
  - Land: 34,655.04 km^{2} (13,380.39 sq mi)
- Areas include native reserve

Population (2021)
  - Total: 30,158
  - Density: 0.9/km^{2} (2.3/sq mi)
  - Change (2016-21): ▼2.8%
  - Dwellings: 15,035
- Time zone: UTC−5 (EST)
  - Summer (DST): UTC−4 (EDT)
- Area codes: 418 and 581
- Website: mrcmanicouagan.qc.ca

Manicouagan (French pronunciation: [manikwaɡɑ̃]) is a regional county municipality in the Côte-Nord region of Quebec, Canada. It is located on the north shore of the St. Lawrence River with its seat in Baie-Comeau. It was created in 1981, and named after the Manicouagan River.

== Subdivisions ==
There are 9 subdivisions and one native reserve within the RCM:

Cities & Towns (1)

- Baie-Comeau

Municipalities (1)

- Franquelin

Parishes (1)

- Ragueneau

Villages (5)

- Baie-Trinité
- Chute-aux-Outardes
- Godbout
- Pointe-aux-Outardes
- Pointe-Lebel

Unorganized Territory (1)

- Rivière-aux-Outardes

Native Reserves (1)
(not associated with RCM)

- Pessamit

== Demographics ==
=== Population ===
Canada census – Manicouagan RCM community profile

	2021	2016	2011
Population	30,158 (-2.8% from 2016)	31,027 (-3.1% from 2011)	32,012 (-3.1% from 2006)
Land area	34,655.04 km^{2} (13,380.39 sq mi)	35,705.48 km^{2} (13,785.96 sq mi)	35,706.53 km^{2} (13,786.37 sq mi)
Population density	0.9/km^{2} (2.3/sq mi)	0.9/km^{2} (2.3/sq mi)	0.9/km^{2} (2.3/sq mi)
Median age	48.4 (M: 48.4, F: 48.8)	46.6 (M: 46.7, F: 46.6)	44.8 (M: 44.8, F: 44.8)
Private dwellings	15,035 (total) 13,781 (occupied)	14,844 (total)	14,580 (total)
Median household income	$73,500	$64,034	$59,298

References: 2021 2016 2011

Historical Census Data - Manicouagan RCM

Year	Pop.	±%
1986	36,369	—
1991	36,108	−0.7%
1996	36,271	+0.5%
2001	33,620	−7.3%

Year	Pop.	±%
2006	33,052	−1.7%
2011	32,012	−3.1%
2016	31,027	−3.1%
2021	30,158	−2.8%

Source: Statistics Canada

=== Language ===
Canada Census Mother Tongue - Manicouagan Regional County Municipality, Quebec
Census	Total	French			English			French & English			Other		
Year	Responses	Count	Trend	Pop %	Count	Trend	Pop %	Count	Trend	Pop %	Count	Trend	Pop %
2016	30,765	28,035	▼3.1%	91.13%	220	▼2.2%	0.72%	95	▲5.6%	0.31%	2,415	▼2.4%	7.85%
2011	31,720	28,930	▼3.1%	91.20%	225	▲21.6%	0.71%	90	▲80.0%	0.28%	2,475	▼5.0%	7.80%
2006	32,695	29,855	▼2.4%	91.31%	185	▼24.5%	0.57%	50	▼44.4%	0.15%	2,605	▲6.8%	7.97%
2001	33,370	30,595	▼9.3%	91.68%	245	▲69.0%	0.73%	90	0.0%	0.27%	2,440	▲21.1%	7.31%
1996	35,990	33,740	n/a	93.75%	145	n/a	0.40%	90	n/a	0.25%	2,015	n/a	5.60%

== Transportation ==
=== Access Routes ===
Highways and numbered routes that run through the municipality, including external routes that start or finish at the county border:

- Autoroutes
  - None
- Principal Highways
  - R-138
- Secondary Highways
  - R-389
- External Routes
  - None

== See also ==
- List of regional county municipalities and equivalent territories in Quebec
