= Rivière du Sault au Mouton =

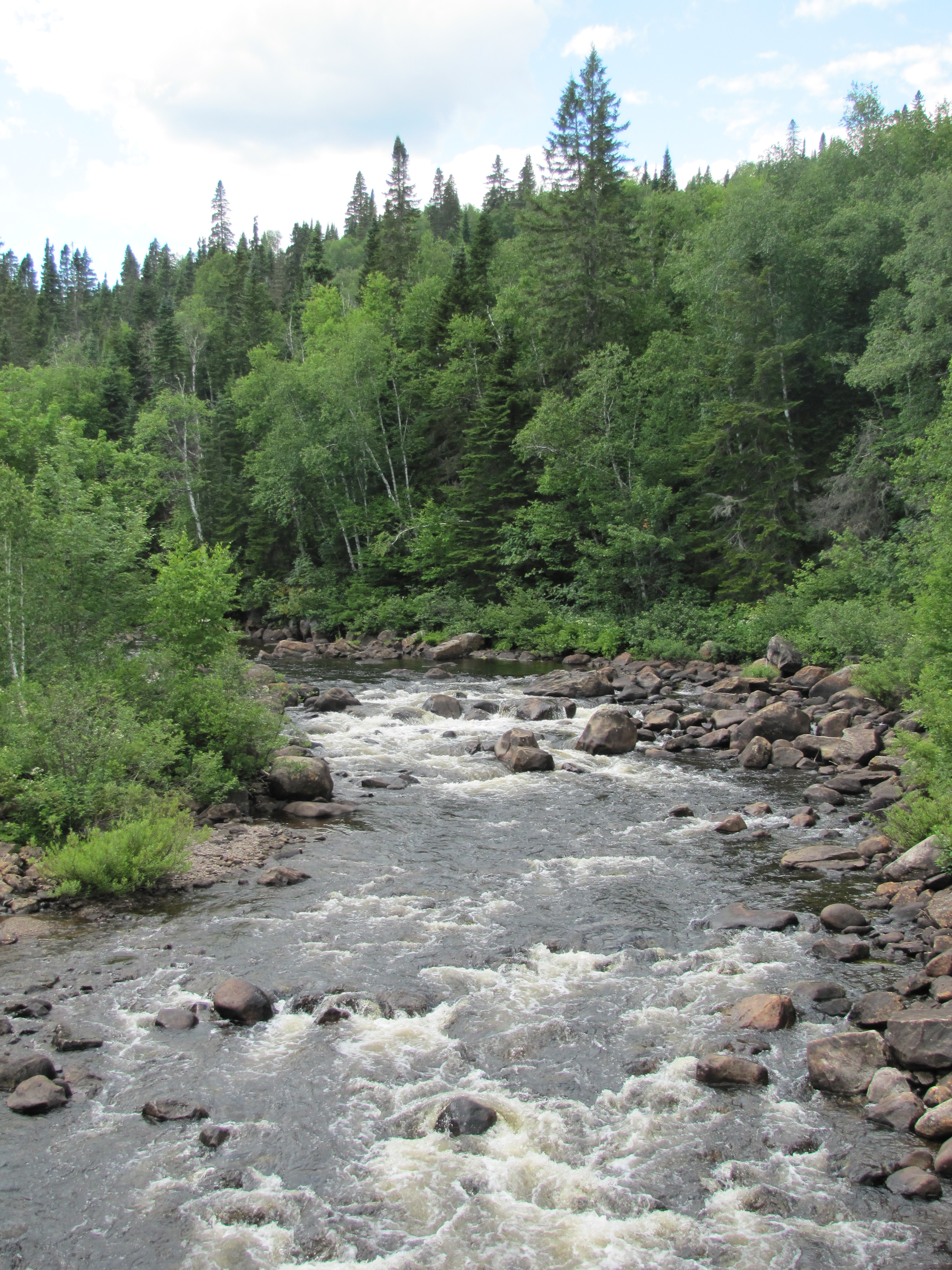
- Rivière du Sault au Mouton

- Location within Quebec

Location
- Country: Canada
- Province: Quebec
- Region: Côte-Nord
- RCM: La Haute-Côte-Nord Regional County Municipality

Physical characteristics
- Source
  - elevation: 494 metres (1,621 ft)
- 2nd source: Lac de la petite montagne
  - coordinates: 48.672855°N 69.783859°E
- Mouth: Estuary of Saint Lawrence
  - location: Longue-Rive
  - coordinates: 48.53889°N 69.2525°W
  - elevation: 0 metres (0 ft)
- Length: 60.2 kilometres (37.4 mi)
- Basin size: 1,946 square kilometres (751 sq mi)

Basin features
- Tributaries
  - left: (upstream) Discharge of Lac Guillaume, Castors River (rivière du Sault au Mouton), Black stream, Aux Bœufs lake discharge, Roussel River.
  - right: (upstream) Discharge from Trois Milles lake, Trout stream, discharge from Cajetan lake, discharge from Lac de la Cabine, discharge from a set of lakes.

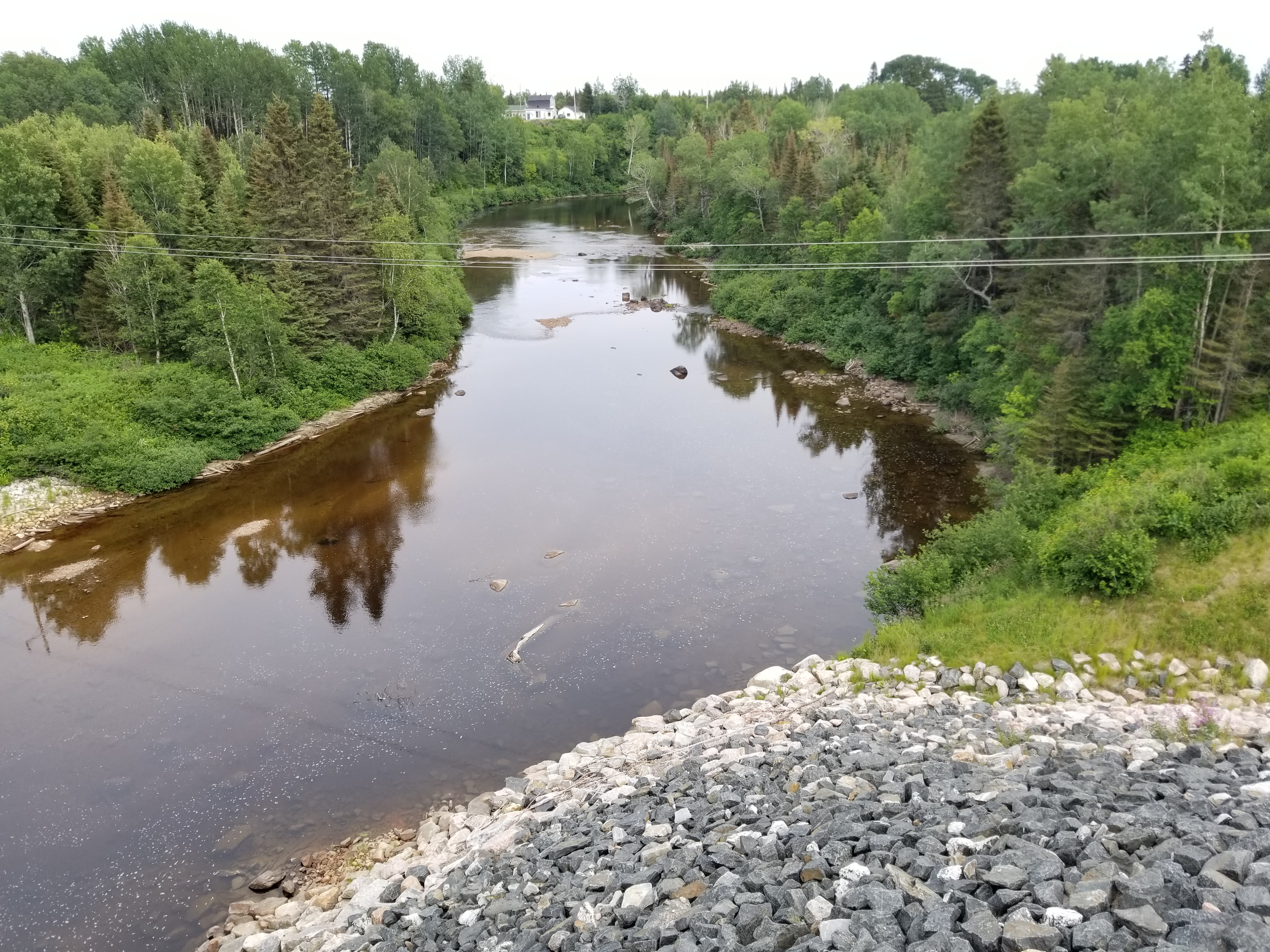
View downstream of the Sault au Mouton river, from the Highway 138 bridge.

The Rivière du Sault au Mouton flows south, on the north shore of the St. Lawrence River, in the unorganized territory of Lac-au-Brochet and the municipality of Longue-Rive, in the La Haute-Côte-Nord Regional County Municipality in the administrative region of Côte-Nord, in the province of Quebec, in Canada. It flows into the estuary of Saint Lawrence at Longue-Rive.

The lower part of the hydrographic slope of the "Sault au Mouton river" is served by the route 138 which crosses it near its mouth. From the village of Sault-au-Mouton, this valley is served by a forest path that goes up to Lake Vaillancourt, passing east of Lake Kergus and east of Lake Trente Milles. From this last lake, a secondary forest road goes up the valley to serve the east of Lac de la Petite Montagne.

Forestry is the main economic activity in this area; second, recreational tourism activities.

The surface of the "Sault au Mouton River" is usually frozen from late November to early April, however safe traffic on the ice generally occurs from mid-December to late March.

== Geography ==
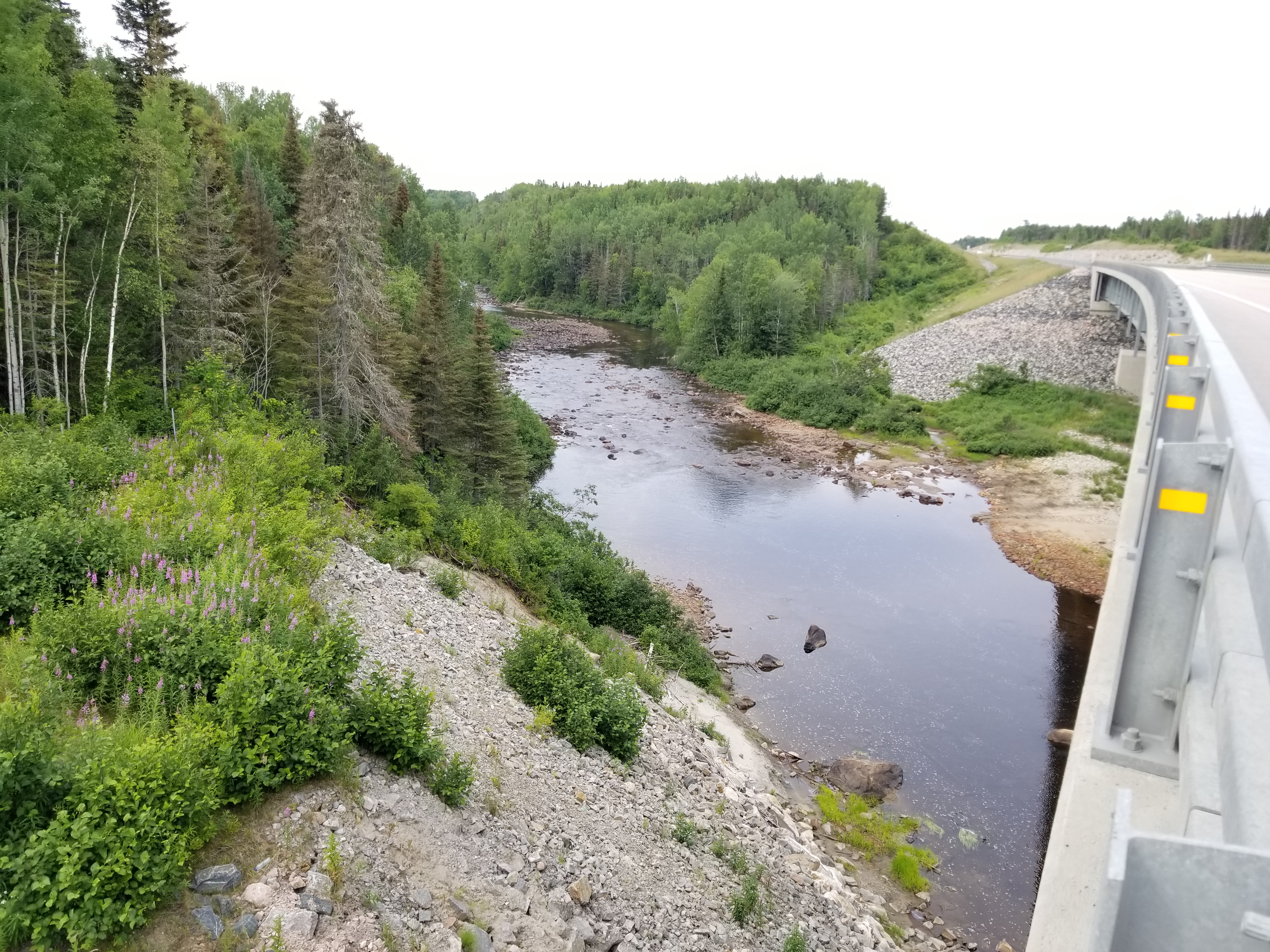
Upstream view of the Sault au Mouton river (QC), from the Highway 138 bridge.

The main neighboring hydrographic slopes of the Sault au Mouton river are:

- North side: Éperlan River, Truite River (La Haute-Côte-Nord), rivière des Cèdres (Portneuf River), Gros Ruisseau, Castors River (rvière du Sault au Mouton), Roussel River, Portneuf River (Côte-Nord);
- East side: St. Lawrence River
- South side: Red stream, Trout stream, La Petite Romaine, Rivière des Petits Escoumins, Rivière des Escoumins.

The "Sault au Mouton river" takes its source at the mouth of the "Grand-Mère lake" (length: 0.6 km (0.37 mi); altitude: 494 m (1,621 ft)) in forest zone, in the unorganized territory of Lac-au-Brochet.

From the mouth of "Lac de la Grand-Mère", the course of the "Sault au Mouton river" flows mainly in the forest area over 60.2 km (37.4 mi) according to the following segments:

Upper course of the Sault au Mouton river (30.7 km (19.1 mi) segment)

- 2.4 km (1.5 mi) towards the south-east, in particular by crossing an unidentified lake (length: 1.4 km (0.87 mi); altitude: 427 m (1,401 ft));
- 6.9 km (4.3 mi) towards the South, collecting the discharge (coming from the East) of Lake Michel and the discharge (coming from the West) of Lake Marcel, to the North shore of "lake of the Little Mountain ";
- 4.6 km (2.9 mi) towards the south, crossing the "lac de la Petite Montagne" (altitude: 412 m (1,352 ft)) over its full length;
- 4.1 km (2.5 mi) towards the east, in particular by crossing the Lac des Trente Milles (length: 2.3 km (1.4 mi); altitude: 401 m (1,316 ft)), up to 'at its mouth;
- 5.9 km (3.7 mi) eastward, cutting a forest road at the end of the segment, to the outlet of lakes Edgar and Ten;
- 6.8 km (4.2 mi) eastward to a bend in the river, corresponding to the confluence of the Roussel River (coming from the north);

Lower course of the Sault au Mouton river (segment of 29.5 km (18.3 mi))

- 5.2 km (3.2 mi) towards the South-East in particular by crossing the Lac des Piliers (length: 2.5 km (1.6 mi); altitude: 229 m (751 ft));
- 5.5 km (3.4 mi) east to a bend in the river;
- 4.0 km (2.5 mi) north-east in Longue-Rive crossing Lac Thibault (length: 0.4 km (0.25 mi); altitude: 183 m (600 ft)) to its mouth which corresponds to the northwestern limit of the former municipality of Saint-Paul-du-Nord;
- 6.2 km (3.9 mi) towards the east in the municipality of Longue-Rive winding between mountains, collecting the Truite stream (coming from the South), the Black stream (coming from the North) and the Castors River (rivière du Sault au Mouton) (coming from the North), to a bend in the river, corresponding to the discharge of a stream (coming from the North-West);
- 4.6 km (2.9 mi) towards the south-east, passing under the high-voltage lines of Hydro-Québec, to a bend in the river;
- 3.6 km (2.2 mi) to the south more or less parallel to the shore of the estuary of Saint Lawrence, forming two loops to the east, up to a bend in the river;
- 0.4 km (0.25 mi) eastward, crossing route 138, up to its mouth.

The Sault au Mouton river flows over a sandstone (at low tide) up to 2.5 km (1.6 mi) on the west bank of the Saint Lawrence River in the sector Sault-au-Mouton of the municipality of Longue-Rive in the bay of Mille-Vaches which is part of the "Hauts-Fonds de Mille-Vaches". This mouth is located at:

- 40.9 km (25.4 mi) east of the source of the river, i.e. the mouth of Lac de la Grand-Mère;
- 12.7 km (7.9 mi) north of the mouth of the rivière des Petits Escoumins;
- south of the center of the hamlet Sault-au-Mouton;
- 24.1 km (15.0 mi) North of the bridge over the mouth of the rivière des Escoumins, in the village of Les Escoumins;
- 56.5 km (35.1 mi) north-east of the center of the village of Tadoussac;
- 25.4 km (15.8 mi) south of downtown Forestville.

== Toponymy ==
The toponym "Rivière du Sault au Mouton" was formalized on December 5, 1968, at the Place Names Bank of the Commission de toponymie du Québec.

== See also ==
- List of rivers of Quebec
