= Brûlée River (Portneuf River tributary) =

- Location within Quebec

Location
- Country: Canada
- Province: Quebec
- Region: Saguenay-Lac-Saint-Jean and Côte-Nord
- Regional County Municipality: Le Fjord-du-Saguenay Regional County Municipality and La Haute-Côte-Nord Regional County Municipality
- Unorganized territory: Lac-au-Brochet

Physical characteristics
- Source: Plat Lake
  - location: Lac-au-Brochet, MRC La Haute-Côte-Nord Regional County Municipality, Côte-Nord, Quebec, Canada
  - coordinates: 48°54′17″N 69°58′45″W
  - elevation: 677 m (2,221 ft)
- Mouth: Portneuf River (Côte-Nord)
  - location: Lac-au-Brochet
  - coordinates: 48°57′31″N 70°07′19″W
  - elevation: 401 m (1,316 ft)
- Length: 20.7 km (12.9 mi)

Basin features
- Tributaries
  - left: (Upward from the mouth) Lake Helio and Taurus outlet, Lake Dracula outlet, Rain Lake outlet.
  - right: (Upward from the mouth) Discharge from Lake Méné, discharge from Lake Cime, discharge from Lake Didier, discharge from Lake Sabra, discharge from Lake Norway, discharge from Lake Finland.

The Brûlée River (English: burnt river) is a tributary of the Portneuf River, flowing on the northwest shore of the Saint Lawrence River, in the Province of Quebec, in Canada. The course of this river crosses the administrative regions of:

- Côte-Nord: in the La Haute-Côte-Nord Regional County Municipality, in the unorganized territory of Lac-au-Brochet;
- Saguenay-Lac-Saint-Jean: MRC of Le Fjord-du-Saguenay Regional County Municipality, in the unorganized territory Mont-Valin.

A secondary forest road serves the Brûlée river valley and goes up north to serve the Lac Émilien area. The forest road R0953 (east–west direction) passes approximately 19.5 kilometres (12.1 mi) north of the upper reaches of the Brûlée river. Some other secondary forest roads serve the territory for the needs of forestry and recreational tourism activities.

Recreational and tourist activities are the main economic activity; forestry, second.

The surface of the Brûlée River usually frozen from the end of November to the beginning of April, however the safe circulation on the ice is generally done from mid-December to the end of March.

== Geography ==
The main hydrographic slopes neighboring the Brûlée river are:

- North side: Lac Emmuraillé, Dégelis Lake, Portneuf River, Andrieux River, Kakuskanus Lake, Lac du Sault aux Cochons, Sault aux Cochons River;
- East side: Sault aux Cochons river, Bouleaux stream, Portneuf East River, Rocheuse River;
- South side: Portneuf river, Liégeois stream, Escoumins River;
- West side: Patien Lake, Portneuf River, Laflamme Lake, Poulin-De Courval Lake, Wapishish River, Rivière aux Sables.

The Brûlée river has its source at the mouth of a flat lake (length: 0.75 kilometres (0.47 mi); altitude: 680 metres (2,230 ft)), in a forest area, in unorganized territory from Lac-au-Brochet. This lake is located 3.0 kilometres (1.9 mi) from the west limit of zec de Forestville, 13.1 kilometres (8.1 mi) southeast of the mouth of the Brûlée river and 7.3 kilometres (4.5 mi) South of the course of the Portneuf East River.

From the mouth of Lac Plat, the course of the Brûlée River flows over 20.7 kilometres (12.9 mi) generally towards the North, according to the following segments:

- 2.5 kilometres (1.6 mi) to the North, then West in particular by crossing Lake Maribou (altitude: 620 metres (2,030 ft)) and Lac à l'Eau Claire (length: 2.0 kilometres (1.2 mi); altitude: 619 metres (2,031 ft)), to its mouth;
- 3.4 kilometres (2.1 mi) towards the North by forming a curve towards the West where the current crosses Lake Bellechasse (length: 2.0 kilometres (1.2 mi); altitude: 619 kilometres (385 mi)) on its full length by skirting a mountain, until the discharge (coming from the East) of the lake of Norway. Note: Lac Bellechasse straddles the boundary of the administrative region of Saguenay-Lac-Saint-Jean and Côte-Nord. A fire tower was located at the top of a mountain (altitude: 734 metres (2,408 ft) at 1.0 kilometre (0.62 mi) West of Lac Bellechasse;
- 2.1 kilometres (1.3 mi) towards the North by crossing the limit of the two administrative regions in a deep valley, up to a stream (coming from the East);
- 6.9 kilometres (4.3 mi) towards the West crossing the limit between the unorganized territories of Lac-au-Brochet and Le Fjord-du-Saguenay Regional County Municipality, meandering up to at the outlet (coming from the North) of Lake Didier;
- 5.8 kilometres (3.6 mi) to the west while winding to its mouth.

The mouth of the Brûlée River flows onto the east shore of Lac Patien which is crossed to the south by the Portneuf River, in the unorganized territory of Mont-Valin. This confluence of the Brûlée river located at:

- 1.5 kilometres (0.93 mi) downstream of the mouth of Lac Emmuraillé which is crossed by the Portneuf river;
- 20.9 kilometres (13.0 mi) South-East of Lake Portneuf;
- 85.7 kilometres (53.3 mi) North-West of the center of the village of Les Escoumins;
- 83.7 kilometres (52.0 mi) West of the mouth of the Portneuf river (confluence with the St. Lawrence Estuary);
- 15.2 kilometres (9.4 mi) North-East of Lac Laflamme;
- 79.8 kilometres (49.6 mi) West of downtown Forestville.

From the mouth of the Brûlée river, the current flows on 118.8 kilometres (73.8 mi) first towards the South, then generally towards the South-East following the course of the Portneuf river to go to discharge on the northwest shore of the St. Lawrence estuary, in Portneuf-sur-Mer.

== Toponymy ==
The toponym Rivière Brûlée was formalized on June 10, 1982, at the Bank of Place Names of the Commission de toponymie du Québec.

== Appendices ==
=== See also ===
- Lac-au-Brochet, an unorganized territory
- La Haute-Côte-Nord Regional County Municipality
- Mont-Valin, an unorganized territory
- Le Fjord-du-Saguenay Regional County Municipality
- Portneuf River, a watercourse
- List of rivers of Quebec
