= Zec de la Rivière-Laval =

- Location within Quebec
- Location: Canada, Quebec, La Haute-Côte-Nord Regional County Municipality
- Nearest city: Forestville, Baie-Comeau
- Coordinates: 48°51′42″N 69°02′51″W
- Area: with a length of 45.5 kilometres (28.3 mi)
- Established: 1980
- Governing body: Association de chasse et pêche de Forestville

The Zec de la Rivière-Laval is a "zone d'exploitation contrôlée" (controlled harvesting zone) (zec) in the unorganized territory of the Lac-au-Brochet, in the municipalities of Colombier and Forestville, in La Haute-Côte-Nord Regional County Municipality, in the administrative region of Côte-Nord (North Shore), in Quebec, in Canada.

In this segment, the zec covers 45.5 kilometres (28.3 mi) on Laval River for the purpose of supervising salmon fishing. The "Association de chasse et pêche de Forestville" was incorporated on October 16, 1967 and received in spring 1980 a mandate to administer the Laval River which then acquire the status of "salmon zec".

== Geography ==
The Laval River flows from north to south in the unorganized territory of the Lac-au-Brochet and in the municipalities of Colombier and Forestville, to empty into the Bay Laval, in the Gulf of St. Lawrence, up to Forestville.

The Laval River has its source in Laval Lake, located in the unorganized territory of the Lac-au-Brochet in La Haute-Côte-Nord Regional County Municipality. With a length of 6 kilometres (3.7 mi), this lake is located in the zec de Forestville.

In his journey to the south, the waters of the Laval River flow on about 14 kilometres (8.7 mi) in the zec de Forestville; then, the river travels another 12 kilometres (7.5 mi) (out of zec de Forestville), in the municipality of Colombier, before crossing on 2.7 kilometres (1.7 mi) lake Jacques (length of 3.2 kilometres (2.0 mi)). From the lake, the river travels 14 kilometres (8.7 mi) before emptying into the Laval Bay. In the last segment of its course, the river flows over 4.7 kilometres (2.9 mi) in the municipality of Forestville.

== Toponymy ==
The name of the zec is directly derived from the name of the Laval River, on the Côte-Nord (North Shore).

The name "ZEC de la Rivière-Laval" was made official on September 5, 1985 at the Bank of place names in the Commission de toponymie du Québec (Geographical Names Board of Quebec).

== See also ==
=== Related articles ===
- Lac-au-Brochet, unorganized territory
- Colombier, municipality
- Forestville, municipality
- La Haute-Côte-Nord Regional County Municipality
- Côte-Nord (North Shore), administrative region of Quebec
- Zec de Forestville
- Laval River
- Zone d'exploitation contrôlée (Controlled harvesting zone) (zec)
