= Laval River Rare Forest =

- Forêt rare de la Rivière-Laval
- IUCN category III (natural monument or feature)
- Location within Quebec
- Location: Colombier, La Haute-Côte-Nord RCM, Côte-Nord, Quebec, Canada
- Nearest city: Forestville
- Coordinates: 48.830021°N 69.056966°W
- Area: 33 ha (82 acres)
- Designation: Rare forest ecosystem
- Designated: 2003
- Governing body: Quebec Ministère des Ressources naturelles, de la Faune et des Parcs

The Laval River Rare Forest (French: Forêt rare de la Rivière-Laval) is a protected area of rare forest in the Côte-Nord region of Quebec, Canada. It is classified as an exceptional forest ecosystem.

== Location ==
The Laval River Rare Forest is in the municipality of Colombier in La Haute-Côte-Nord Regional County Municipality. It is 11 kilometres (6.8 mi) to the north of Forestville. The 33 hectares (82 acres) Laval River Rare Forest (Forêt rare de la Rivière-Laval) is on the east side of the Laval River between Lac à Jacques and Route 138. The forest is administered by the Forest Environment Directorate of Quebecʻs Ministry of Natural Resources, Wildlife and Parks. It was designated a rare forest ecosystem in 2003, and has IUCN management category III.

A map of the ecological regions of Quebec shows the Forestville region in the 5g-T ecological subregion of the east fir/white birch subdomain. The Laval River area is dominated by stands of balsam fir (Abies balsamea). The soil consists of glacial deposits, with many rocky outcrops. The forest has developed on the thin and stony soils of the flat areas and small hills along the east bank of the river.

== Flora ==
The Laval River Rare Forest is a young stand of black spruce (Picea mariana) and red pine (Pinus resinosa). The presence of red pine is unusual, since it is far from its normal range, which in Quebec is mainly the deciduous forest area to the west of the Gatineau River where the climate is milder and fires are more common. Red pines are hardly ever found on the Côte-Nord, and this stand would have needed repeated fires to have survived.

The stand is open and has developed after a fairly severe fire around 1960. It is mainly black spruce and balsam fir, but red pines are scattered throughout. The red pines have many branches, and the stems are very twisted. Trunks are sometimes over 20 centimetres (7.9 in) in diameter at chest height and only 8 metres (26 ft) high, probably due to poor soil. The fire seems to have been the cause of the low density of trees and the abundant Ericaceae and lichens in the undergrowth, which reduces competition from balsam fir.

The shrub and herbaceous layer is dominated by species adapted to poor and dry environments such as sheep laurel (Kalmia angustifolia), common blueberry (Vaccinium myrtilloides), lowbush blueberry (Vaccinium angustifolium), Cladonia rangiferina (Cladonia rangiferina), green reindeer lichen (Cladonia mitis) and northern reindeer lichen (Cladonia stellaris). The frequency of these species in the undergrowth would be expected to decrease with time unless a new fire re-establishes conditions favorable to their growth.

== Sources ==
- Forêt rare de la Rivière-Laval (PDF) (in French), Ministère des Ressources naturelles, de la Faune et des Parcs
- Forêt rare de la Rivière-Laval Canada, Protected Planet
- Forêt rare de la Rivière-Lava, Ressources naturelles Canada
- Saucier, J.-P.; Robitaille, A.; Grondin, P.; Bergeron, J.-F.; Gosselin, J. (2011), Les régions écologiques du Québec méridional (PDF) (map), 4 (in French), Ministère des Ressources naturelles et de la Faune, archived from the original (PDF) on 2020-06-19
