= Zec de Forestville =

- Location within Quebec
- Location: Canada, Québec, La Haute-Côte-Nord Regional County Municipality
- Nearest city: Baie-Comeau
- Coordinates: 48°54′00″N 69°18′00″W
- Area: 1,328 km^{2} (513 sq mi)
- Established: 1978
- Governing body: Association de Chasse et Pêche de Forestville inc.

The ZEC Forestville is a "zone d'exploitation contrôlée" (controlled harvesting zone) (ZEC) in the unorganized territory of the Lac-au-Brochet, in La Haute-Côte-Nord Regional County Municipality, in Quebec, in Canada. The area was designated a zone d'exploitation contrôlée in 1978.

Zec Forestville is managed by the "Association de Chasse et Pêche de Forestville inc" (Association of Hunting and Fishing of Forestville), which is a non-profit organization. Its primary mission is to see the wildlife management fairly and development of hunting, fishing, camping and outdoor.

== Geography ==
Zec de Forestville has an area of 1328 square kilometers and has 935 lakes within its territory.

Zec Forestville is located between the rivers Betsamites (north-east) and the Cedar (south-west), which descend from north to south and empties into the St. Lawrence River. Specifically, the ZEC is bounded by:

- on the west by the creek Marcoux (more or less), and by lakes Vidal, Baloney, Langlois, Flic, Sally, Lapointe, Sylvie, the Three Caribou, Marlene, of Fog, Turcot, Cyclone and Star;
- on the south by Bruno lakes, des îles (the islands), Harper, Marac, Clinto and "de l'Oie" (Goose);
- on the east, by the limits of unorganized territory of Lac-au-Brochet, are the boundaries of neighboring municipalities Portneuf-sur-Mer, Forestville and Colombier; lakes along this boundary are: Seeley, Murray, Dudley, Ruthman, Neris Sagona, Hall, Sylvio, Bilodeau, Lafrance, Gonzaga, MacDonald;
- on the north by Pipmuacan Reservoir (crossed by the river Betsiamites) (northeast), and lakes Marcel, the Bulldog, Caron, Guy and Juanita.

The main rivers of the ZEC are: Adam (water coming from the lake Adam), Sault-aux-Cochons (from Lake Sault-aux-Cochons), Laval (from Lake Laval), Isidore (from Lake Isidore, in the North) and "Volant" (steering wheel). "Ruisseau aux Bouleaux" (Creek to Birch) (water coming from "Lac-aux-Bouleaux" (Lake to Birch)) is the main stream of the ZEC.

Zec de la Rivière-Laval

The ZEC de Forestville administers the course of the Laval river, which is the outlet of Lake Laval. The latter is 6 km long and is located in the ZEC de Forestville. In his journey to the south, the waters of the river Laval flow for about 14 km in the ZEC de Forestville; then, the river travels another 12 km (out of ZEC e Forestville) before crossing the lake Jacques. Then the river runs 14 km before emptying into the Bay Laval, north of the village of Forestville.

== History ==
The Association of Hunting and Fishing of Forestville (ACPF) was incorporated on October 16, 1968. Under the rules, the 142 members were all citizens of Forestville. In 1978, following the cancellation of the leases of private clubs on Crown land, the territory of the reserve covers 1,308 square kilometers. The ACPF is then mandated to administer the territory, which will now be designated as a "zec de Forestville". The number of members of the ACPF then increases from 750 (in 1977) and 2035 (1978).

In spring 1980 the ACPF is mandated by the Department to administer the Laval River which then acquires the status of ZEC to Salmon. Considering this new mission to protect aquatic life, this administration constituted an interesting challenge.

Generally, in recent years the number of members of the ZEC Forestville, still managed by the Association of Hunting and Fishing of Forestville, is 800 members

== Hunting and fishing ==
Zec de Forestville is part of the No. 18 fishing zone. The zec attribute quota about recreational fishing for the following main species: pike, brook trout, perch and lake trout.

Generally, ice fishing (on ice) is practiced in winter, from December 1 until April 15. Apart from the closed water bodies, it is possible to go ice fishing on any lake in the country. Note: Users must ascertain from ZEC closed for ice fishing lakes.

ZEC is in the hunting area no. 18 and allows the hunting of big animal, small animal and waterfowl. On the territory of the ZEC, the hunting restriction is depending on different periods of the year, the type of gear hunting, sex of the beasts (mouse) for the following species: moose, black bear, grouse, hare and woodcock. Moreover, the small animal (grouse) is practiced in winter until April 30, 2014 and snaring 31 March.

In summer, users of Zec come to pick wild berries such as raspberries, cranberries, blueberries and chokecherries.

Canoe camping is regularly practiced on the Sault-aux-Pigs River. Canoeing is at an easy level for the river generally has sometimes steady flow is vivid. There are rapids of Class I and some Class II. However, a segment of 2900 meters long on the river is an impassable turns, due to the presence of a fall. Users can get a detailed river guide at the visitor center.

Down the river, boaters can enjoy the "pots" that are natural phenomena in the form of cylindrical depressions. They are formed in the water during active stones entrained in a rotational movement, gradually eroding the rock.

Observers of the fish and wildlife like to go ZEC. When hiking on the land access roads, users can see a variety of wildlife including: Canadian beaver, Porcupine, lynx, black bear, moose and small animal.

ZEC also offers accommodation in cottages (for hire) and the camping use in addition to outdoor activities.

The hunting and fishing permit is available by the city office of the zec in Forestville. The entrance station of Zec is located at 41 Route 138 East, Forestville, QC.

== See also ==
=== Related articles ===
- Colombier, Quebec, municipality
- Côte-Nord, administrative region of Quebec
- Forestville, Quebec, municipality
- La Haute-Côte-Nord Regional County Municipality (RCM)
- Lac-au-Brochet, Quebec, unorganized territory
- Zec de la Rivière-Laval
- Betsiamites River, a watercourse
- Volant River, a watercourse
- Isidore River, a watercourse
- Truchon Creek, a watercourse
- À la Dame River, a watercourse
- Laval River, a watercourse
- Nicette River, a watercourse
- Zone d'exploitation contrôlée (Controlled Harvesting Zone) (ZEC)

=== External links ===
- Official site of the Municipality of Colombier
- Official site of the city of Forestville
- Official site of the MRC Haute-Côte-Nord
