= Rivière du Sault aux Cochons =

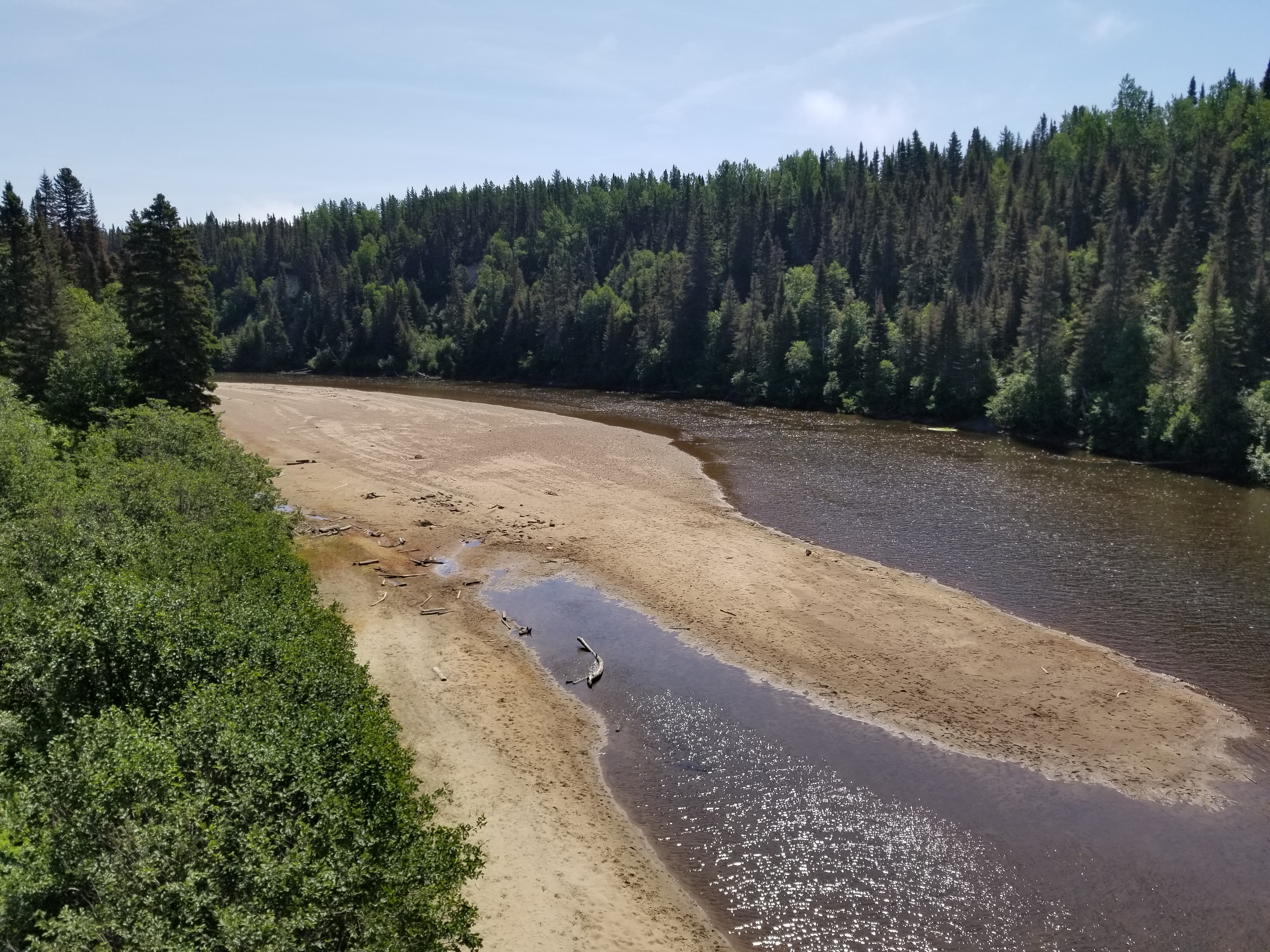
- Rivière du Sault aux Cochons vue de l'aval du pont de la route 138 à Forestville.

- Location within Quebec

Location
- Country: Canada
- Province: Quebec
- Region: Côte-Nord
- RCM: Minganie

Physical characteristics
- Source
  - elevation: 244 metres (801 ft)
- 2nd source: Lake Breault
  - coordinates: 49.27361°N 69.95861°E
  - elevation: 90 metres (300 ft)
- Mouth: Gulf of Saint Lawrence
  - location: Forestville
  - coordinates: 48.73444°N 69.06528°W
  - elevation: 0 metres (0 ft)
- Length: 128 kilometres (80 mi)
- Basin size: 1,946 square kilometres (751 sq mi)
- Discharge
  - location: Mouth
  - average: 3.8 cubic metres per second (130 cu ft/s)
  - minimum: 0.8 cubic metres per second (28 cu ft/s)
  - maximum: 9.2 cubic metres per second (320 cu ft/s)

Basin features
- Tributaries
  - left: (upstream) Tardif stream, Sirois stream, Dassylua stream, Limite stream, Jean-Raymond stream, Lac de la Tour outlet, Lac à Pitou outlet, Nazaire stream, Rivière à la Dame, Butler stream, Nicette River, ruisseau à Truchon, discharge from Lac de la Montagne, discharge from Lac des Enfers, discharge from Lac Grillade, Isidore River, discharge from Les Quatre Lacs, Alphabet stream, discharge from Lake Zéphirin, discharge of a set of lakes (including Lac de la Montagne), rivière aux Canards (rivière du Sault aux Cochons), discharge of Lac Labori.
  - right: (upstream) discharge from Lac L'Allemand, discharge from Lac des Cyprès, discharge from Lac Primas, Boulay brook, Cymac brook, Grosse Roche brook, Adèle brook, Viens brook, Jumeaux brook, Savard brook, Brise-Culotte brook, Les Huit Lacs, Lac Savage outlet, Lac du Castor outlet, Lac Sally outlet, Bouleaux stream, Lake Turcot outlet, Lac de la Tour outlet, La Loche River (rivière du Sault aux Cochons), discharge from Lac Painchaud, discharge from Lac des Caribous.

The Sault aux Cochons River (French: rivière du Sault aux Cochons, pronounced [ʁivjɛʁ dy sot‿o kɔʃɔ̃]) flows south, on the north shore of the Saint Lawrence River, in the La Haute-Côte-Nord Regional County Municipality in the administrative region of Côte-Nord, in Quebec, in Canada. This watercourse successively crosses the townships of Amos, Le Baillif, Bayfield and Miller. It also crosses the zec de Forestville, then flows into the estuary of Saint Lawrence at Forestville.

== Toponymy ==
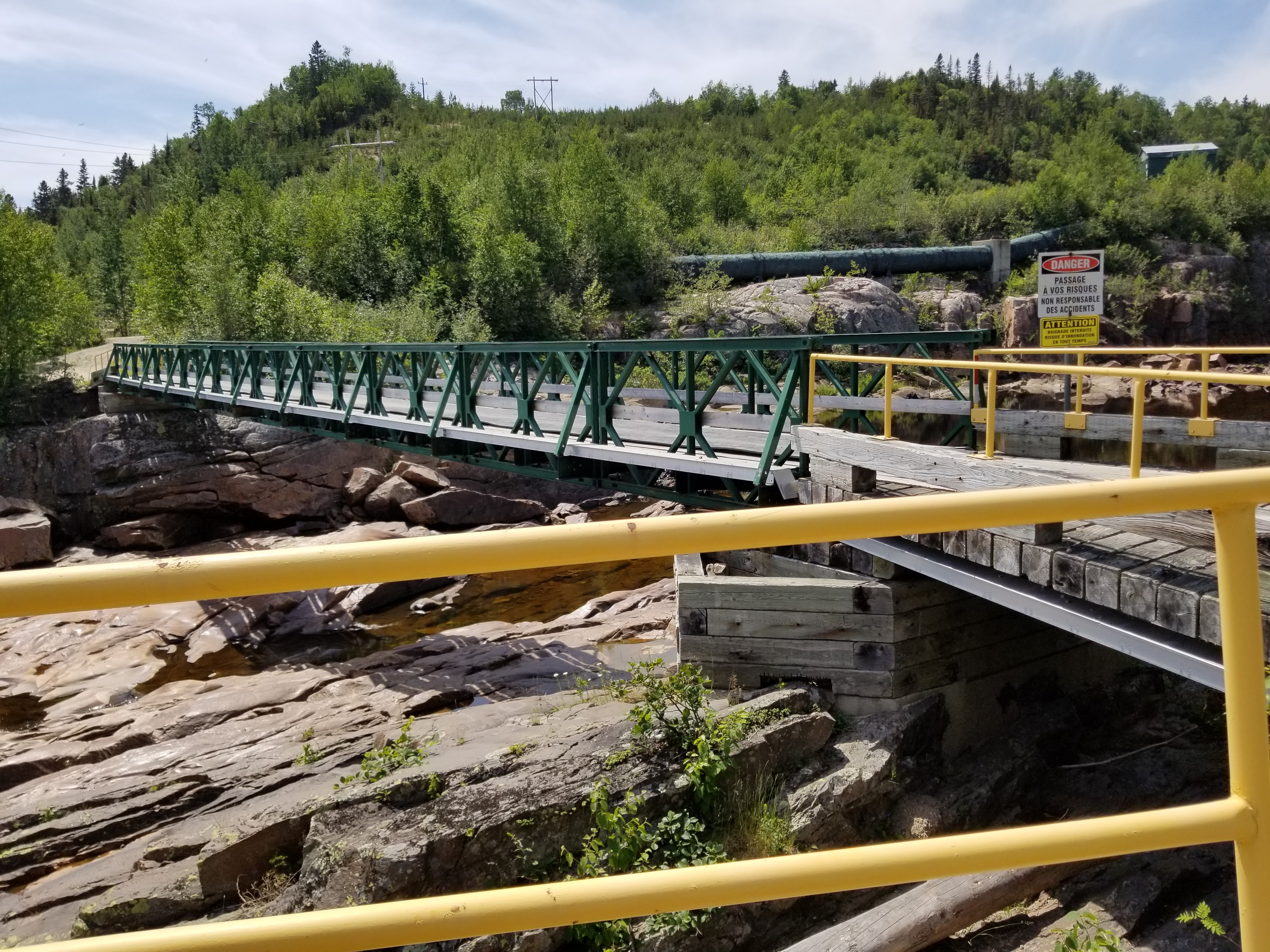
Bridge spanning the Sault aux Cochons river, near its mouth

The toponym Sault aux Cochons river has been known since the 17th Century thanks to Louis Jolliet who indicated it in his writings under the spelling “sault au Cochon”. This toponym evokes the presence of porpoises, called pigs or sea pigs in popular language, at the mouth of this river. In addition, this name identifies around ten geographic entities along the shores of the St. Lawrence River, visited by porpoises for centuries. The change from the singular to the plural was observed at the beginning of the 20th century; finally the plural form was officially recognized in 1950 by the Commission de géographie du Québec.

The toponym Rivière du Sault aux Cochons was made official on December 5, 1968, at the Place Names Bank of the Commission de toponymie du Québec.

== Geography ==
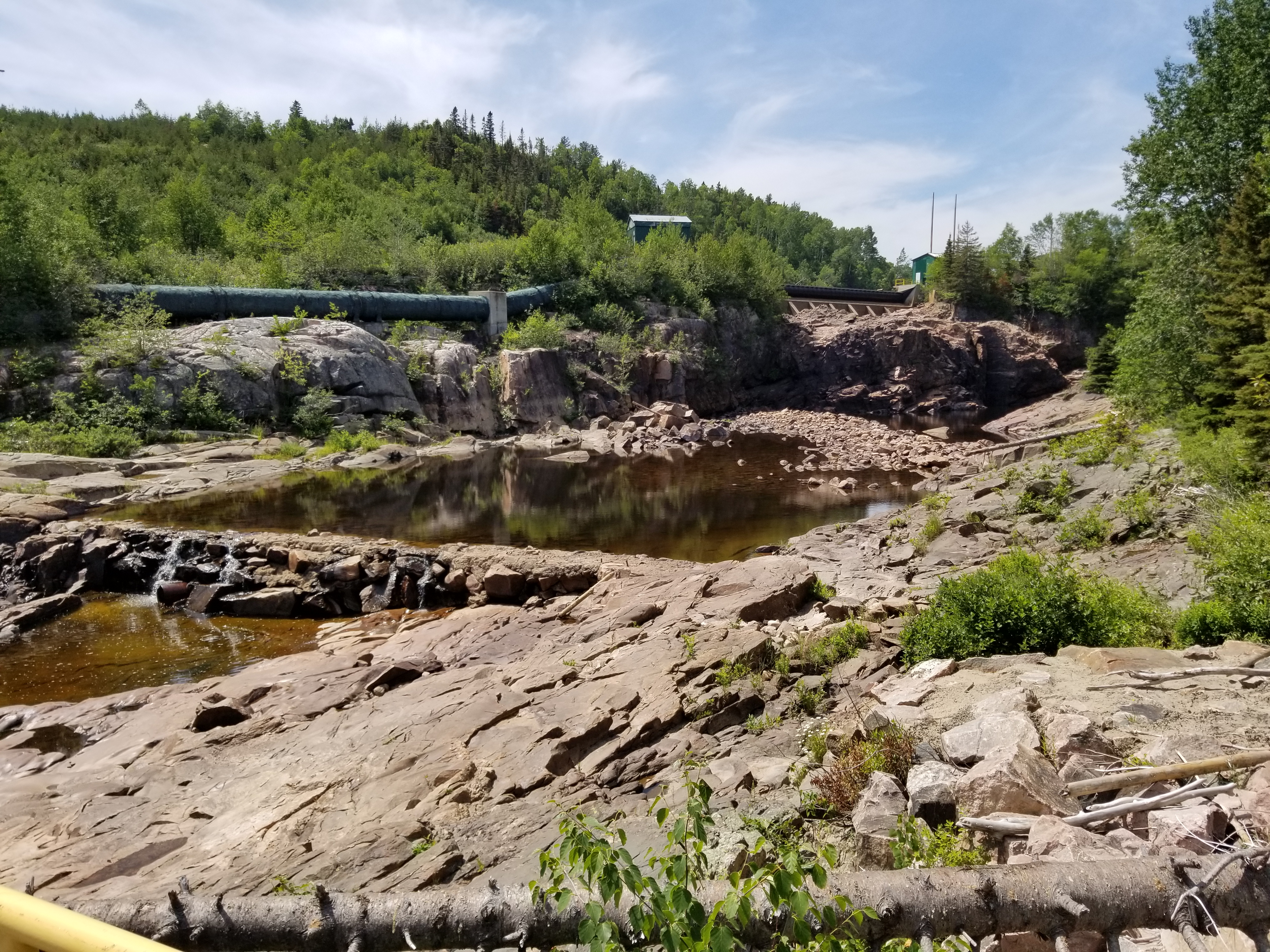
Hydroelectric dam near the mouth of the Sault aux Cochons River in Forestville (upstream view).

The Sault aux Cochons River has its source in Breault Lake, 9 km (5.6 mi) south of Pipmuacan Reservoir. It then flows in a southwesterly direction and crosses Sault aux Cochons Lake halfway through. It flows over a length of 159 km (99 mi) according to the Commission de toponymie du Québec or of 128 km (80 mi) according to the Organisme des basins versants de la Haute-Côte-Nord to flow into the St. Lawrence River at Forestville. The fifteen kilometer downstream of Sault aux Cochons Lake is encased in a canyon. The area of its watershed is 1,946 km^{2} (751 sq mi).

The wetlands cover 14.9 km^{2} (5.8 sq mi).

In 2003, a portion of the waters of the Sault aux Cochons River was diverted to the Pipmuacan reservoir by the Lionnet River in order to increase the capacity of the power stations Bersimis-1 and Bersimis-2.

== History ==
The river was used for timber floating until the early 1990s.

== Terrestrial avifauna ==
The main bird species in this watershed include: the ruffed grouse, woodcock, spruce grouse and willow ptarmigan.

According to the Atlas of the Breeding Birds of Southern Quebec, 125 species are recorded in the Sault aux Cochons River basin. The greatest diversity in the study area was observed in the Atlas Square (100 km^{2} (39 sq mi)) which encompasses the St. Lawrence River, the Sault aux Cochons River estuary and the first 10 kilometers of the river. In this sector, 96 species have been identified, among which, species usually associated with the Saint Lawrence River, such as common eider and black guillemot.

On May 26, 1999, an aerial survey by helicopter enabled the identification of 12 species of aquatic birds between the mouth of the Sault aux Cochons River and the Lionnet River, including the Sault aux Cochons Lake. Anatidae were the most represented group with 9 species and the most abundant with 111 individuals.

== Canoe and kayak ==
The Sault aux Cochons River is considered to be canoeable on its entire route. It is generally considered easy with the exception of the 15 km (9.3 mi) downstream of Sault aux Cochons Lake which are more robust.

== See also ==
- List of rivers of Quebec

== Bibliography ==
- OBVHCN (2014). Portrait général de la zone de gestion intégrée de l’eau Haute-Côte-Nord [General portrait of the integrated water management zone of Haute-Côte-Nord] (Report) (in French). Les Escoumins: Organisme des bassins versants de la Haute-Côte-Nord [Organization of the watersheds of the Haute-Côte-Nord].
- Office of public hearings on the environment (2001). Projects for the partial diversion of the Portneuf and Sault aux Cochons rivers (PDF). p. 168. "report of investigation and public hearing"
