= Ragueneau =

Ragueneau is a French surname.

== People ==
- Abraham Ragueneau (1623–1681), French painter
- Gaston Ragueneau (1881–1978), French athlete
- Paul Ragueneau (1608–1680), French Jesuit missionary
- Philippe Ragueneau (1917–2003), French journalist and writer

== See also ==
- Ragueneau, Quebec, a parish municipality in Canada
- Ragueneau, a character from Edmond Rostand's play Cyrano de Bergerac
