= Portneuf River East =

Portneuf River East Old name: « Bras Nord-Est de la Rivière Portneuf »
- Location within Quebec
- Native name: Rivière Portneuf Est (French)

Location
- Country: Canada
- Province: Quebec
- Region: Côte-Nord
- Regional County Municipality: La Haute-Côte-Nord Regional County Municipality
- Unorganized territory: Lac-au-Brochet

Physical characteristics
- Source: Émilien Lake
  - location: Lac-au-Brochet, MRC La Haute-Côte-Nord Regional County Municipality, Côte-Nord, Quebec, Canada
  - coordinates: 48°59′10″N 70°01′53″W
  - elevation: 586 m (1,923 ft)
- Mouth: Portneuf River (Côte-Nord)
  - location: Lac-au-Brochet
  - coordinates: 48°48′42″N 69°46′35″W
  - elevation: 382 m (1,253 ft)
- Length: 37.7 km (23.4 mi)

Basin features
- Tributaries
  - left: (Upward from the mouth) Lake Gaston outlet; discharge of a set of lakes including Lac Tremblay and Bouchard; discharge from lakes Mulot, Durand, Pellerin, Eugène, Étroit, Cerda, Cap Brun and du Rocher; Lac Éric outlet; outlet of Lake Nano.
  - right: (Upward from the mouth) Lac du Loup Marin outlet, Lac la Botte outlet, Plate River (Portneuf River East), Lac du Chicot outlet, Lac Mimi outlet, Lento, Éphod and Antoine lakes outlet, Lac Hou, outlet of Lac Raymond.

The Portneuf East River is a tributary of the Portneuf River, flowing on the northwest shore of the Saint Lawrence River, in the territory from Lac-au-Brochet, in the La Haute-Côte-Nord Regional County Municipality, in the administrative region of Côte-Nord, Quebec, Canada.

From route 138, the forest road “Chemin de la Rivière des Cèdres” goes up the valley of the Portneuf river to the mouth of the Rivière des Cèdres. From there, a secondary forest road goes north-west to the peninsula south of the mouth of the Portneuf East river. The mountainous topography of the Portneuf East River hinders the development of a forest road for this valley.

Forestry is the main economic activity in the sector; recreational tourism, second.

The surface of the Portneuf East River is usually frozen from the end of November to the beginning of April; however, safe circulation on the ice is generally made from mid-December to the end of March.

== Geography ==
The main hydrographic slopes neighboring the Portneuf East River are:

- North side: Tremblay lake, Bouleaux stream, Sault aux Cochons River;
- East side: Portneuf River, à la Loutre stream, Rocheuse River;
- South side: Portneuf River, Émond stream;
- West side: Plate river, Grand-Mère lake, Portneuf river.

The Portneuf East River rises at the mouth of Lake Emilien (length: 1.8 kilometres (1.1 mi); altitude: 579 metres (1,900 ft)) surrounded by mountains. The mouth of this lake is located 6.8 kilometres (4.2 mi) East of Lake Daniel; 25.0 kilometres (15.5 mi) North-West of the mouth of the Portneuf East river.

From Lac Émilien, the Portneuf East River generally flows east, then south-east, entirely in forest areas over 37.7 kilometres (23.4 mi) according to the following segments:

Upper course of the Portneuf East River (segment of 24.3 kilometres (15.1 mi)

- 6.8 kilometres (4.2 mi) to the East, crossing Lake Samit (length: 1.2 kilometres (0.75 mi);

altitude: 523 metres (1,716 ft)) over its full length and Lake Ale (length: 0.8 kilometres (0.50 mi); altitude: 512 metres (1,680 ft)) over its full length, as well as by forming a curve towards the South, up to the discharge (coming from the North) of a set of lakes including Éric, Garant, Noir, Épinette, Cameo and Élie;

- 6.1 kilometres (3.8 mi) towards the South-East, in particular collecting the outlet of lakes Lento, Ephod and Antoine, as well as crossing Lake Charles (length: 450 kilometres (280 mi); altitude: 0.9 metres (2 ft 11 in)), up to a bend in the river.

Note: Lac Charles receives the outlet (coming from the Southwest) from Lac du Chicot;

- 6.8 kilometres (4.2 mi) towards the North-East, up to an unidentified stream (coming from the North-West);
- 3.8 kilometres (2.4 mi) towards the South-East comprising a loop towards the North and an area of marsh at the end of the segment, until the confluence of an unidentified river (coming from the North-West);

Lower course of the Portneuf East River (segment of 13.4 kilometres (8.3 mi)

- 6.6 kilometres (4.1 mi) to the Southeast with a marsh area at the start of the segment and crossing several rapids, until the confluence of the Plate River;
- 0.4 kilometres (0.25 mi) towards the South by forming a curve towards the East, up to the outlet (coming from the South-West) of Lac la Botte;
- 2.1 kilometres (1.3 mi) south-east, to the outlet (coming from the west) of Lac du Loup Marin;
- 2.8 kilometres (1.7 mi) to the south, up to a bend in the river;
- 1.5 kilometres (0.93 mi) forming a large loop towards the East in a valley embedded between the mountains, up to the confluence of the river.

The Portneuf East River flows in a curve from the East bank of the Portneuf River at the head of a series of rapids stretching 0.5 kilometres (0.31 mi) to the South. This confluence is located at:

- 54.1 kilometres (33.6 mi) West of the confluence of the Portneuf and St. Lawrence rivers;
- 51.3 kilometres (31.9 mi) Southwest of Forestville town center;
- 58.1 kilometres (36.1 mi) north-west of the village center of Les Escoumins;
- 74.4 kilometres (46.2 mi) North-West of North-West of the center of the village of Tadoussac.

== Toponymy ==
The toponym "Rivière Portneuf Est" was formalized on December 5, 1968, at the Place Names Bank of the Commission de toponymie du Québec.

== See also ==
- List of rivers of Quebec
