= Portneuf River =

Portneuf River or Rivière Portneuf may refer to:

- Portneuf River (Capitale-Nationale), a tributary of the Saint Lawrence River in Portneuf Regional County Municipality, Capitale-Nationale, Quebec, Canada
- Portneuf River (Côte-Nord), a tributary of the Saint Lawrence River in Côte-Nord and Saguenay-Lac-Saint-Jean, Quebec, Quebec, Canada; see list of rivers of Quebec
- Portneuf River East, a tributary of Portneuf River (Côte-Nord) in Quebec, Canada
- Portneuf River (Idaho), a tributary of the Snake River in southeastern Idaho, United States
