= Ragueneau, Quebec =

Ragueneau
- Parish municipality
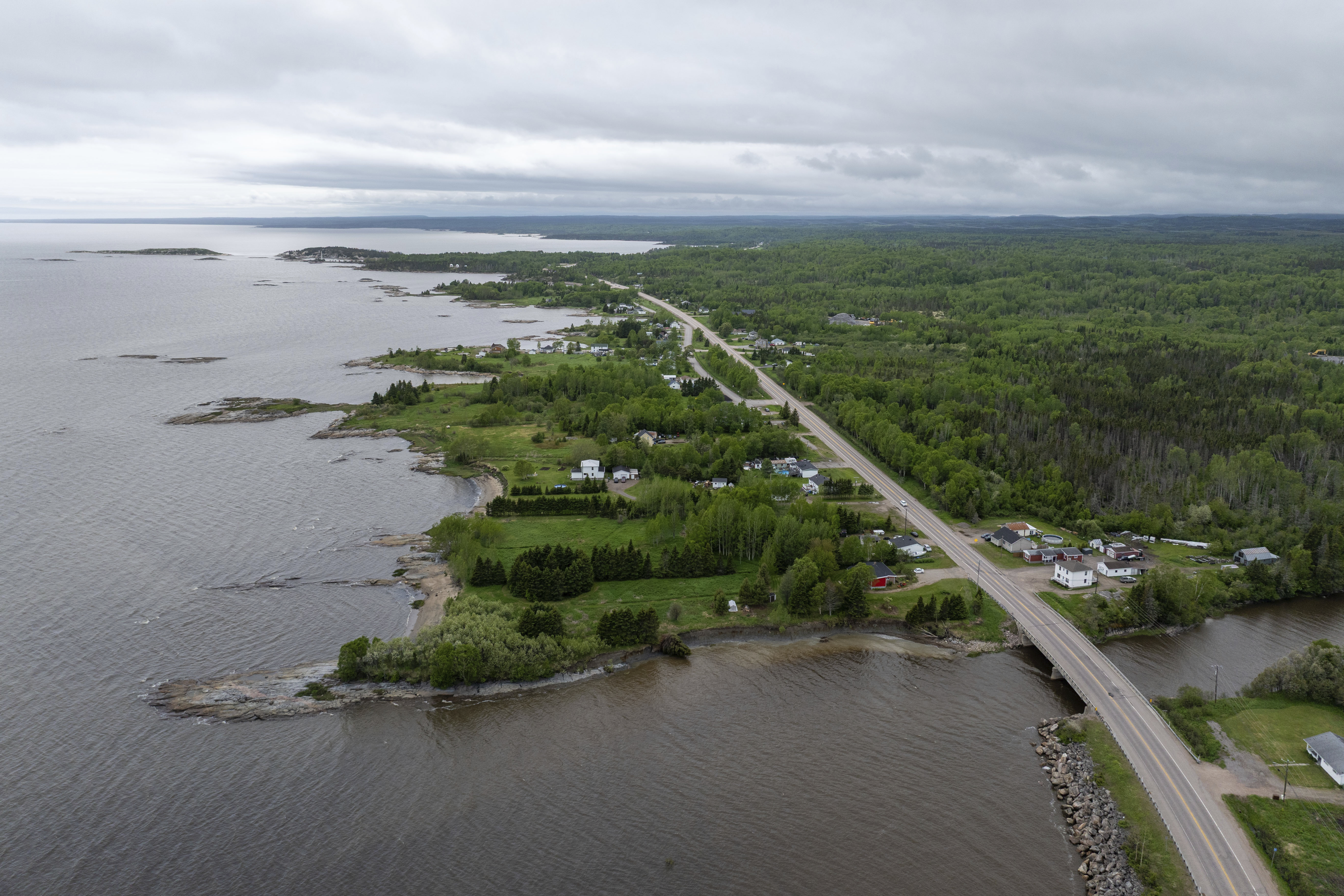
- Ragueneau in 2026

- Coat of arms
- Motto: Courage, Labor, Peace
- Location in Côte-Nord region of Quebec
- Coordinates: 49°04′N 68°32′W
- Country: Canada
- Province: Quebec
- Region: Côte-Nord
- RCM: Manicouagan
- Settled: 1920
- Constituted: March 7, 1951
- Named for: Paul Ragueneau

Government
  - Mayor: Raymond Lavoie
  - Federal riding: Côte-Nord—Kawawachikamach—Nitassinan
  - Prov. riding: René-Lévesque

Area
  - Total: 215.37 km^{2} (83.15 sq mi)
  - Land: 179.83 km^{2} (69.43 sq mi)

Population (2021)
  - Total: 1,314
  - Density: 7.3/km^{2} (19/sq mi)
  - Pop (2016-21): ▼2.2%
  - Dwellings: 713
- Time zone: UTC−5 (EST)
  - Summer (DST): UTC−4 (EDT)
- Postal code(s): G0H 1S0
- Area codes: 418 and 581
- Highways: R-138
- Website: www.municipalite. ragueneau.qc.ca

Ragueneau (French pronunciation: [ʁaɡno]) is a parish municipality located on Outardes Bay, on the north shore of the maritime estuary of the St. Lawrence River, in Côte-Nord region, Manicouagan RCM, in Quebec, Canada.

== History ==
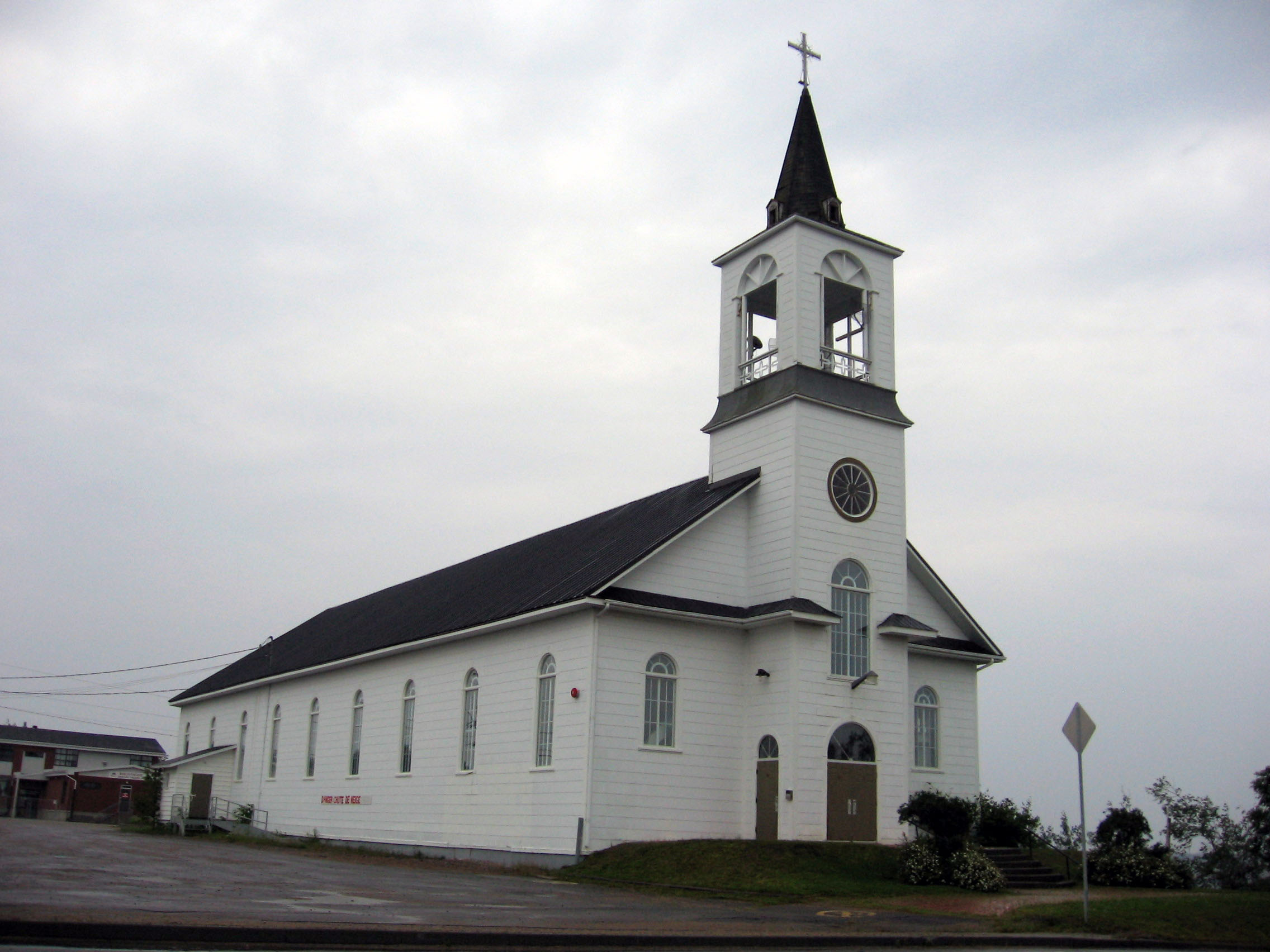
Église de Ragueneau

The first settlers arrived in 1920, mostly from Saint-Paul-du-Nord, Les Escoumins, and Sainte-Anne-de-Portneuf. That same year, Ragueneau Township was proclaimed and named after Jesuit Paul Ragueneau (1608-1680). In 1926, its post office opened.

Three communities developed concurrently along the shores of the Saint Lawrence: Rivière-à-la-Truite in the north-east, Ruisseau-Vert in the centre, and Ragueneau in the south-west. The main administrative, commercial, cultural, and religious activities concentrated in Ruisseau-Vert, so that over time this community became known as Ragueneau itself. In 1951, the Parish Municipality of Ragueneau was incorporated.

== Demographics ==
In the 2021 Census of Population conducted by Statistics Canada, Ragueneau had a population of 1,314 living in 613 of its 713 total private dwellings, a change of −2.2% from its 2016 population of 1,343. With a land area of 179.83 km^{2} (69.43 sq mi), it had a population density of 7.3/km^{2} (18.9/sq mi) in 2021.

Historical census populations – Ragueneau, Quebec

Year	Pop.	±%
1956	1,523	—
1961	1,747	+14.7%
1966	2,016	+15.4%
1971	1,802	−10.6%
1976	1,970	+9.3%
1981	1,917	−2.7%
1986	1,843	−3.9%

Year	Pop.	±%
1991	1,722	−6.6%
1996	1,684	−2.2%
2001	1,584	−5.9%
2006	1,520	−4.0%
2011	1,405	−7.6%
2016	1,343	−4.4%
2021	1,314	−2.2%

Source: Statistics Canada

Mother tongue (2021):

- English as first language: 0%
- French as first language: 97.7%
- English and French as first language: 0%
- Other as first language: 2.3%
