= Saint-Paul-du-Nord =

District in Canada

Saint-Paul-du-Nord (Quebec French pronunciation: [sɛ̃ pɔl dy nɔʁ]) is a district (secteur) of the municipality of Longue-Rive, Quebec, Canada.

Prior to May 28, 1997, Saint-Paul-du-Nord was an independent municipality; on that date, it and the village of Sault-au-Mouton were merged into Saint-Paul-du-Nord-Sault-au-Mouton (later renamed Longue-Rive).

== History ==
The sector was originally part of Escoumains. In 1898, the sector became an independent municipality under the name of Saint-Paul-de-Mille-Vaches. In 1931, the municipality changed its name to Saint-Paul-du-Nord. In 1997, the municipality was merged with Sault-au-Mouton to create the current municipality of Longue-Rive.

== Demographics ==
Historical census populations – Saint-Paul-du-Nord

Year	Pop.	±%
1921	1,172	—
1931	1,348	+15.0%
1941	1,322	−1.9%
1951	883	−33.2%
1956	1,056	+19.6%
1961	1,124	+6.4%
1966	1,076	−4.3%

Year	Pop.	±%
1971	951	−11.6%
1976	908	−4.5%
1981	879	−3.2%
1986	896	+1.9%
1991	789	−11.9%
1996	767	−2.8%

Source: Statistics Canada
