= Boreal Loppet =

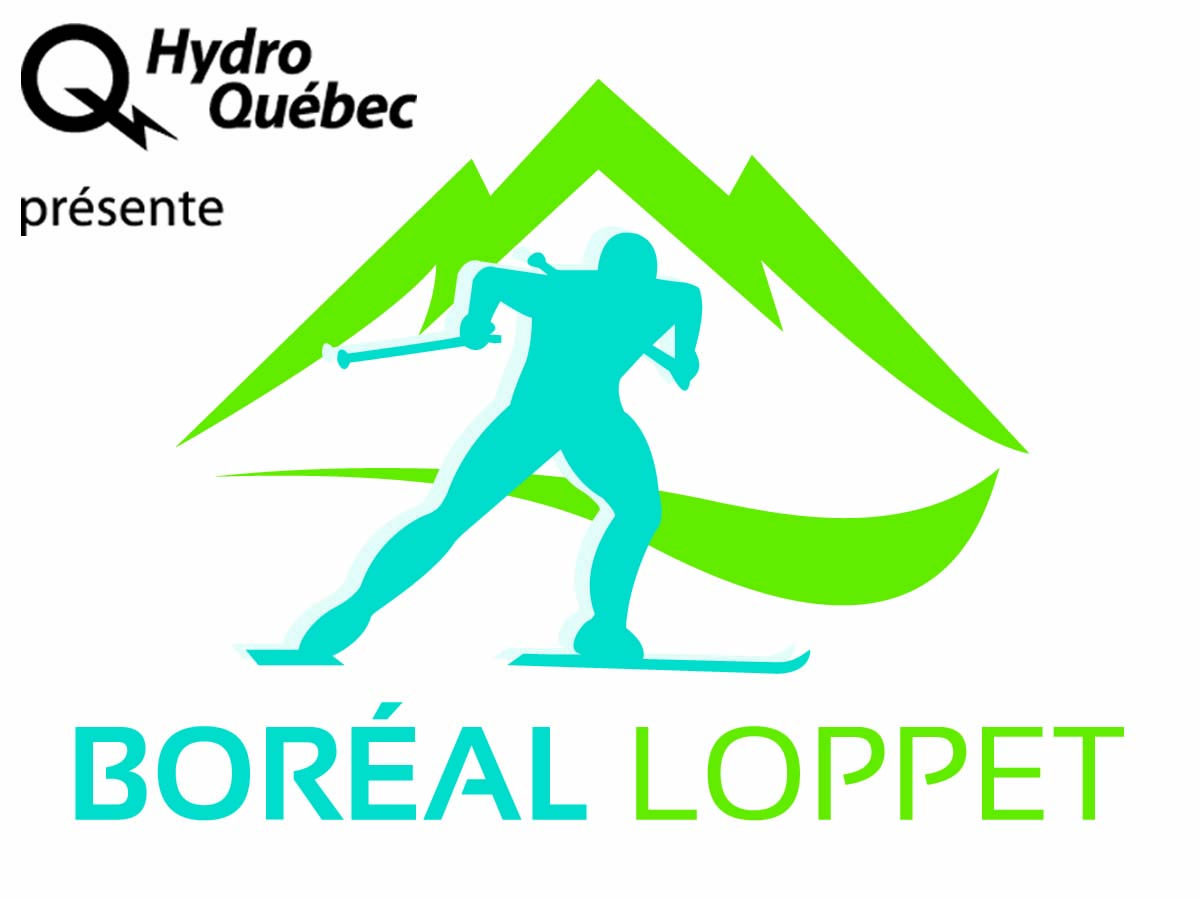
- Logo 2013 du Boréal Loppet présenté par Hydro-Québec
- Status: active
- Genre: sporting event
- Date: February
- Frequency: annual
- Locations: Forestville, Quebec
- Country: Canada
- Inaugurated: 2004

The Boréal Loppet is a recurring cross-country skiing competition held in Forestville, Quebec, Canada, for all the elite skiers and amateurs wishing challenges without relying on performance. Five (5) courses are presented. First easy loops 4 km, 7 km and 13 km for the family. Then two loops of 27 km and 60 km for the most enduring. All starts and finish are the same point, behind a hotel with a restaurant.

== History ==
In 2002, the idea of organizing a competition of long-distance cross-country skiing (loppet) north of Forestville make his way through the mind of Dave Delaunay, physical education teacher, and Eric Maltais, language teacher of the local high school and both keen skiers. Dave suggested an extreme course: the grand tour by taking the local snowmobile trail network lying on the ZEC de Forestville. This is finally what they called later: Défi Boréal. Gino Jean, also physical education teacher, joined them. The distance was 100 km. The enthusiasm for long distance competitions (Tour du Mont -Valin, Keskinada, marathons races mountain bike) was then noticeable in Quebec, especially in the population over 30 years. Each of these races attracts between 300 and 500 riders (3,000 in the case of Keskinada in Gatineau). February 28, 2004, after two years of reflection and two months of preparation, Dave Delaunay, Gino Jean and Éric Maltais, and a team of snowmobilers have completed the distance in 7 hours 55 minutes. The beauty of the trail and ski conditions confirmed that the Défi Boréal could attract many elite skiers and also those who take part of loppet competitions in Quebec. In 2005, they added to the 100 km ride a 38 km to attract a skiers who likes smaller distances. On 25 March 2006, the Défi Boréal becomes Boréal Loppet Hydro-Québec and offers five (5) courses.

== Key points ==
From 2005 to 2011, this event has held the title of longest cross-country skiing race in the world with 103 kilometres (64 mi) on a course from A point to B point. The event welcomes more than 200 participants each year with a peak of 280 in 2008. There are also more than 1,700 participants who take part to the event since his foundation.

The event hosted several spokespersons whose writer and journalist Michel Jean had officiate for the 10th edition in 2014. Note also the participation of Pierre Lavoie, Steve Cyr and Marie-Pier Parent over previous years.

The winter rendez-vous is part of sanctioned events by Ski de fond Canada et Ski de fond Québec, it is also one of nine (9) stages of the Circuit des maître of AMSFQ.

== Benefits on the community ==
Since its creation, the event has generated economic benefits of nearly $400,000 for Forestville and its surroundings. It is also the involvement of about 150 volunteers for each edition. More than 50 cash or services partners involved in the presentation of the event that Hydro-Québec appearing as a presenter since 2005.

The event is also known for its investments with scholar persistence and to fight against school dropping. Since 2004, nearly $50,000 were injected in scholarships to students or to facilitate the practice of school sports at the local high school. Results: the school dropout rate decreased from 25% in 2005 to 14% in 2013 thanks to, among others, the money invested in scholarships and school sports clubs.

The event includes an important component for winter tourism Tourisme Manicouagan Côte-Nord and adheres to Tourisme Québec through Bonjour Québec branding .

== Different awards through the years ==
- 1. 2012 : Évènement de l'année à la soirée de reconnaissance des bénévoles de Forestville
- 2. 2008 : Grand Prix du tourisme régional | Prix Festivals et événements touristiques : Budget d'exploitation de moins de 1 M$
- 3. 2008 : Prix d'excellence de la Fédération des commissions scolaires du Québec
- 4. 2007 : Grand Prix du tourisme régional | Prix du développement du tourisme hivernal
- 5. 2006 : Gala Méritas Unité régionale de loisir et de sport Côte-Nord | Événement sportif de l'année
- 6. 2006 : Gala Hommage aux gens de chez nous | Événement sportif
- 7. 2006 : Gala Hommage aux gens de chez nous | Prix du jury
- 8. 2006 : Gala Hommage aux gens de chez nous | Prix sportif
