= Paul Ragueneau =

French Jesuit missionary (1608–1680)

Paul Ragueneau, SJ (French: [pɔl ʁaɡno]; 18 March 1608 – 3 September 1680) was a Jesuit missionary in New France.

== Biography ==
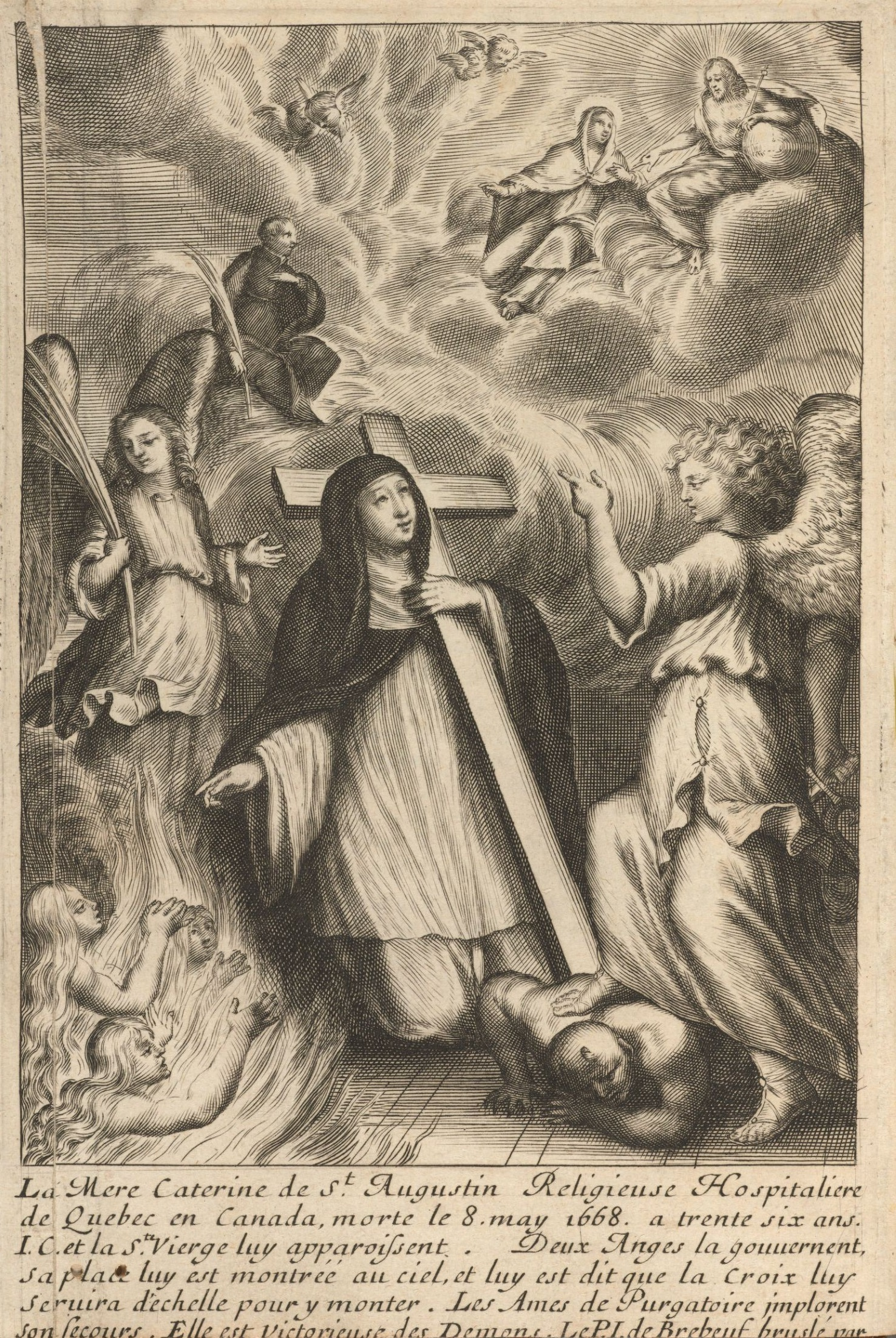
La vie de la mere Catherine de Saint Augustin by Ragueneau, 1671

He was born in Paris and died in the same city. He is sometimes confused with his elder brother François, also a Jesuit. Father François Ragueneau accompanied Father Charles Lalemant who was returning to Canada in 1628. Their vessel was captured by Kirke who was then blockading the St. Lawrence and he was sent as a prisoner to England. It cannot be determined whether Francois ever did visit the Canadian missions.

Paul Ragueneau became a novice in the Society of Jesus in 1626. From 1628 to 1632 he taught at the Collège in Bourges after which he furthered his religious training at the College of La Flèche. From there, he went to Quebec in 1636.

Upon arriving in Quebec, he was almost immediately sent to the Huron mission where he worked under the instruction of Fathers Jean de Brébeuf and Jérôme Lalemant for eight years. In 1645 he became superior of the Huron mission. During his time as superior, a number of his missionaries met their deaths, the first being Father Antoine Daniel (4 July 1648). They became known as the Canadian Martyrs. He remained at his post on St. Mary's on the Wye until 1649, when persuaded by the Huron leaders to join the fugitives on St. Joseph's island (1649).

After a bloody defeat, followed by the massacres of Fathers Noël Chabanel and Charles Garnier, Ragueneau, yielding to the entreaties of the few whom famine, pestilence, and the fury of the Iroquois had spared, led the small band of 400 survivors, the remnants of a nation of ten thousand, to their final refuge, Quebec, after a long and perilous journey. Ragueneau wrote the Relations of the Hurons of 1648–49, 1649–50, 1650–51, and 1651–52 which describes the destruction of the mission.

In 1650, he became vice-rector of the College of Quebec, and superior of the Canadian mission. In 1656, Ragueneau was assigned to the residence at Trois-Rivières. In 1657, he left for Sainte-Marie-de-Ganentaa. He was part of the times that saw the departure of Fathers Chaumonot, Le Moyne, and other missionaries. This first attempt at an organized apostolate among the Iroquois had failed.

In 1662 he returned to France and remained there as procurator of the mission. Ragueneau died in Paris 3 September 1680.

The Parish Municipality of Ragueneau in Quebec, Canada, is named after him. In July 2012, there were proposals to name a Canadian federal riding after him.
