= Portneuf-sur-Mer =

- Municipality
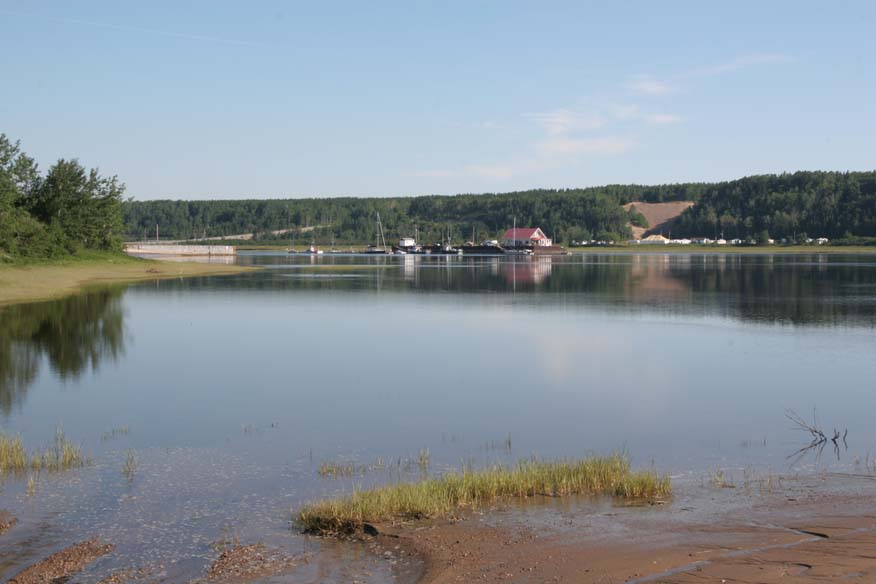
- Marina of Portneuf-sur-Mer

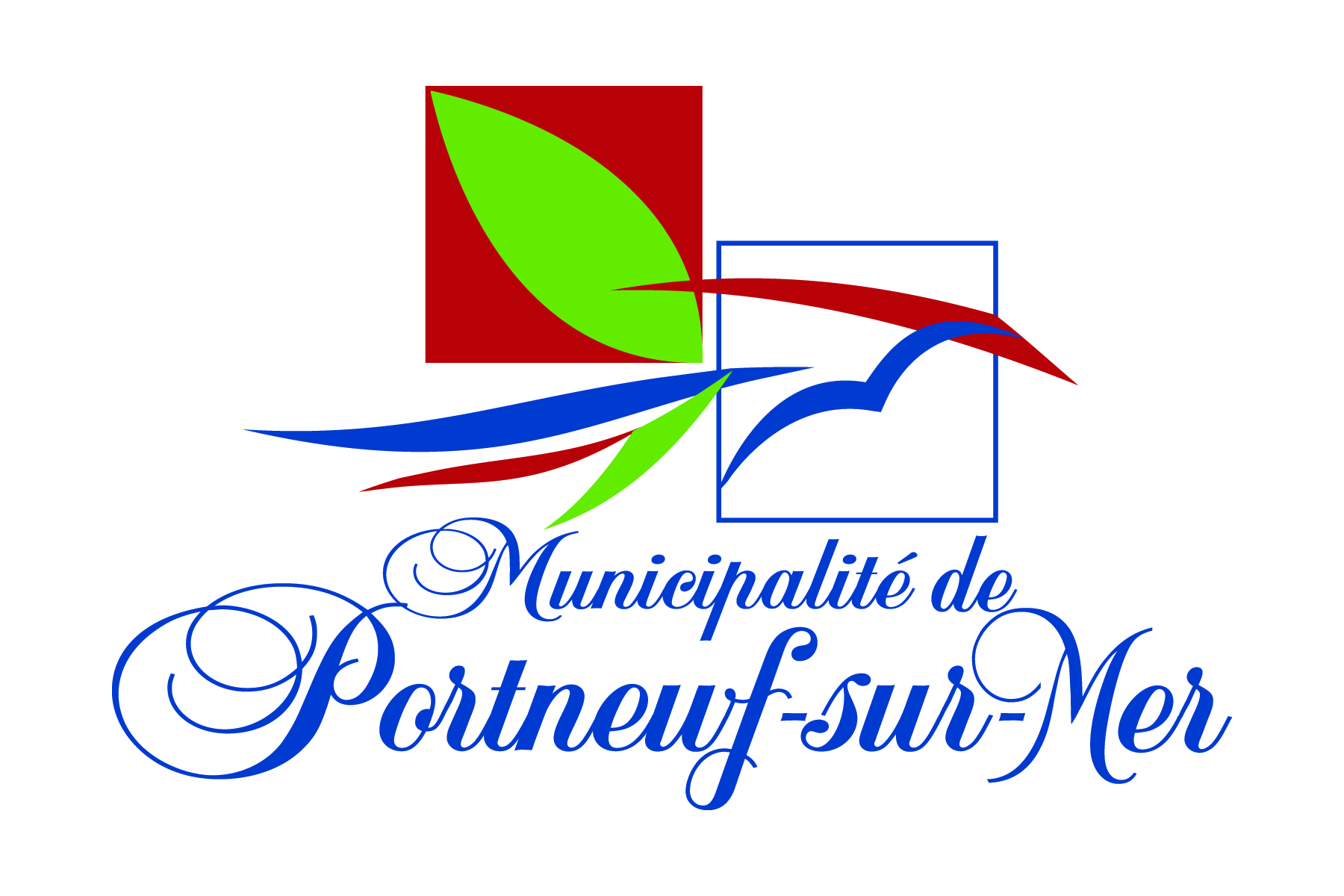
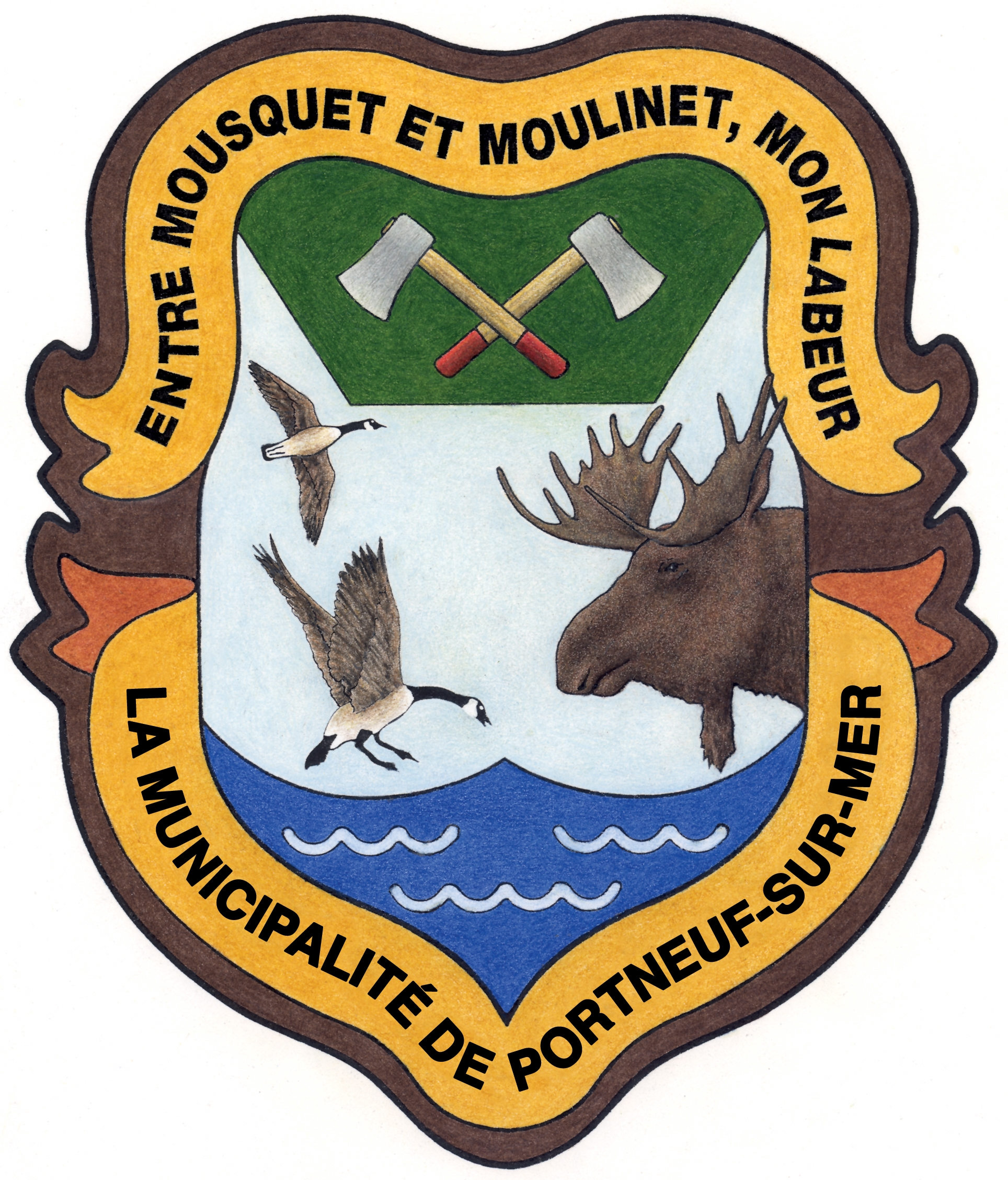
- Flag Coat of arms

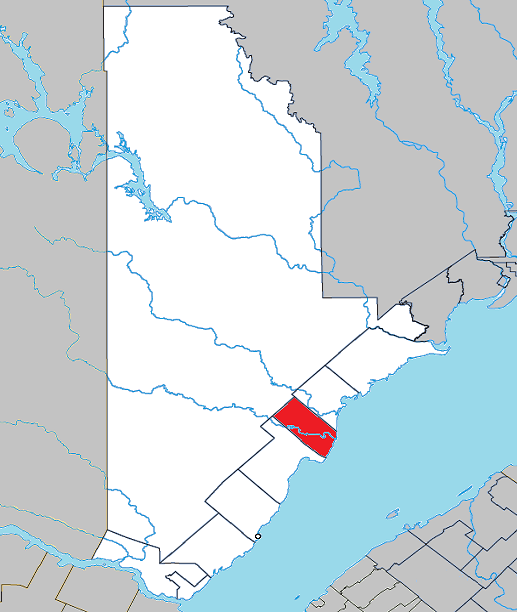
- Location within La Haute-Côte-Nord RCM

- Location in Côte-Nord region of Quebec
- Coordinates: 48°37′N 69°06′W
- Country: Canada
- Province: Quebec
- Region: Côte-Nord
- RCM: La Haute-Côte-Nord
- Constituted: September 12, 1902

Government
  - Mayor: Jean-Maurice Tremblay
  - Federal riding: Côte-Nord—Kawawachikamach—Nitassinan
  - Prov. riding: René-Lévesque

Area
  - Total: 210.12 km^{2} (81.13 sq mi)
  - Land: 181.90 km^{2} (70.23 sq mi)

Population (2021)
  - Total: 612
  - Density: 3.4/km^{2} (8.8/sq mi)
  - Pop (2016-21): ▼4.5%
  - Dwellings: 357
- Time zone: UTC−5 (EST)
  - Summer (DST): UTC−4 (EDT)
- Postal code(s): G0T 1P0
- Area codes: 418 and 581
- Highways: R-138
- Website: portneuf-sur-mer.ca

Portneuf-sur-Mer (French pronunciation: [pɔʁnœf syʁ mɛʁ]) is a municipality in the Côte-Nord region of the province of Quebec in Canada. The municipality is located at the mouth of the Portneuf River on the St. Lawrence River.

The municipality was known as Sainte-Anne-de-Portneuf prior to January 31, 2004.

== History ==
Around 1500, this place was already visited by Basques whalers and sealers, who may have named it after Port-Neuf near Bayonne in Basque Country. It was mentioned by Samuel de Champlain in 1626 as "Port neuf", and François de Crespieul held his first mass there in 1683. A trading post existed there at the end of the 17th century. In 1788, a chapel was built at the mouth of the Portneuf River and dedicated to Saint Anne.

Permanent settlement began in around 1845, and the community had several names over time: Saint-Georges in 1848 (after the surveyor Georges Duberger), Portneuf Mills in 1882 (due to the presence of a mill), and Hamilton Cove in 1883 (named after a forestry company). This last name was also chosen for the post office. The Innu called the location Mitinekapitsh or Mitinakup.

In 1875, the parish of Sainte-Anne-de-Portneuf was founded. In 1902, the place was incorporated as the United Township Municipality of Sainte-Anne de Portneuf, when it split off from the Township of Saint-Paul de Mille-Vaches (now part of Longue-Rive). In 1949, the post office was renamed to Portneuf-sur-Mer.

On January 1, 1950, it lost part of its territory when the Municipality of Saint-Luc-de-Laval was created (which was annexed into Forestville in 1980). On July 16, 1955, the united township municipality changed statutes and became a regular municipality. On January 31, 2004, it was renamed to Portneuf-sur-Mer.

== Demographics ==
=== Population ===
Historical Census Data - Portneuf-sur-Mer, Quebec

Year	Pop.	±%
1911	912	—
1921	428	−53.1%
1931	903	+111.0%
1941	2,011	+122.7%
1951	1,051	−47.7%
1956	1,386	+31.9%
1961	1,521	+9.7%

Year	Pop.	±%
1966	1,496	−1.6%
1971	1,393	−6.9%
1976	1,303	−6.5%
1981	1,255	−3.7%
1986	1,115	−11.2%
1991	1,032	−7.4%
1996	990	−4.1%

Year	Pop.	±%
2001	922	−6.9%
2006	835	−9.4%
2011	761	−8.9%
2016	641	−15.8%
2021	612	−4.5%

2016 Population figure based on revised count. Population counts are not adjusted for boundary changes.
Source: Statistics Canada

Private dwellings occupied by usual residents (2021): 321 (total dwellings: 357)

Mother tongue (2021):

- English as first language: 0%
- French as first language: 100%
- English and French as first language: 0%
- Other as first language: 0%

== Government ==
List of former mayors:

- Alcide Tremblay (1940–1941)
- Albertus Bouchard (1941–1943)
- Alcide Tremblay (1943–1957)
- Gilles Tremblay (1957–1958)
- Alcide Tremblay (1959–1961)
- Jules Ouellet (1961–1963)
- Alcide Tremblay (1963–1964)
- Benoit Gagnon (1964–1966)
- Adélard Maltais (1966–1967)
- Alcide Tremblay (1967–1973)
- Clarisse Miller Gagnon (1973–1977)
- Renaud Desmeules (1977–1985)
- Jean-Marie Delaunay (1985–2013)
- Gontran Tremblay (2013–2021)
- Jean-Maurice Tremblay (2021–present)

== Notable people ==
- Hugo Girard, strongman

== See also ==
- List of municipalities in Quebec
