= Longue-Rive =

- Municipality
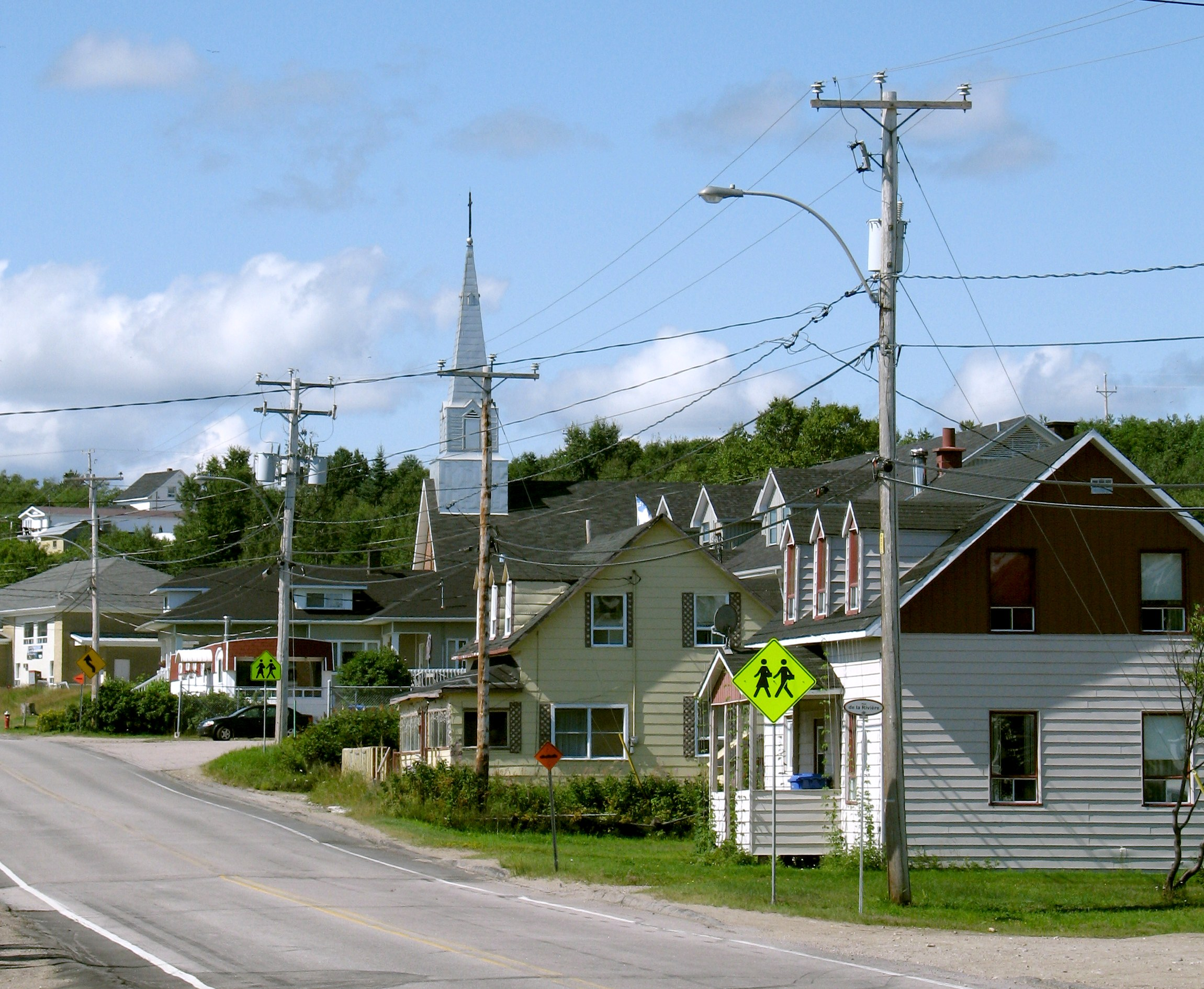
- Rue Principale in Sault-au-Mouton

- Coat of arms

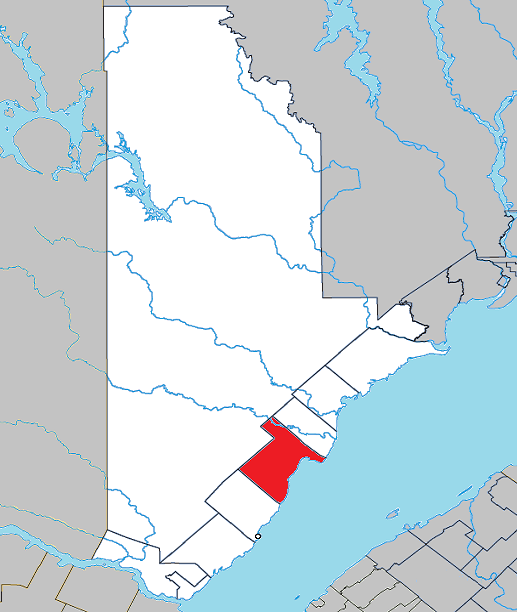
- Location within La Haute-Côte-Nord RCM

- Location in Côte-Nord region of Quebec
- Coordinates: 48°33′N 69°15′W
- Country: Canada
- Province: Quebec
- Region: Côte-Nord
- RCM: La Haute-Côte-Nord
- Constituted: May 28, 1997

Government
  - Mayor: Donald Perron
  - Federal riding: Côte-Nord—Kawawachikamach—Nitassinan
  - Prov. riding: René-Lévesque

Area
  - Total: 321.18 km^{2} (124.01 sq mi)
  - Land: 308.06 km^{2} (118.94 sq mi)

Population (2021)
  - Total: 918
  - Density: 3/km^{2} (7.8/sq mi)
  - Pop (2016-21): ▼10.5%
  - Dwellings: 562
- Time zone: UTC−5 (EST)
  - Summer (DST): UTC−4 (EDT)
- Postal code(s): G0T 1Z0
- Area codes: 418 and 581
- Highways: R-138
- Website: longuerive.ca

Longue-Rive (French pronunciation: [lɔ̃ɡ ʁiv]) is a municipality located on the north shore of the maritime estuary of the St. Lawrence River, in Côte-Nord region, Quebec, Canada.

The municipality includes the communities of Sault-au-Mouton, Baie-des-Bacon, Pointe-à-Boisvert, Rivière-Éperlan and Saint-Paul-du-Nord.

== History ==
On June 2, 1898, the Township Municipality of Saint-Paul de Mille-Vaches was formed when it split off from the Municipality of Escoumains. It changed statutes on July 4, 1931, to become the Municipality of Saint-Paul-du-Nord.

On January 1, 1947, the Village Municipality of Sault-au Mouton was created when it separated from Saint-Paul-du-Nord.

In May 1997, the Village Municipality of Sault-au-Mouton and the Municipality of Saint-Paul-du-Nord were merged into the new Municipality of Saint-Paul-du-Nord–Sault-au-Mouton. The municipal council had 12 months to request for a name change, in consultation with its population. The new name Longue-Rive was chosen out of a list of 10 options through a referendum on May 26, 1998, and approved by the government on September 22, 1998. Longue-Rive (French for "long shore") refers to the municipality's location along the north shore of the maritime estuary of the St. Lawrence River.

== Demographics ==
Historical census populations – Longue-Rive
Year	Pop.	±%
2001	1,352	—
2006	1,259	−6.9%
2011	1,113	−11.6%
2016	1,026	−7.8%
2021	918	−10.5%
Source: Statistics Canada

Mother tongue language (2021)
Language	Population	Pct (%)
French only	910	98.9%
English only	10	1.1%
Both English and French	0	0.0%
Other languages	0	0.0%

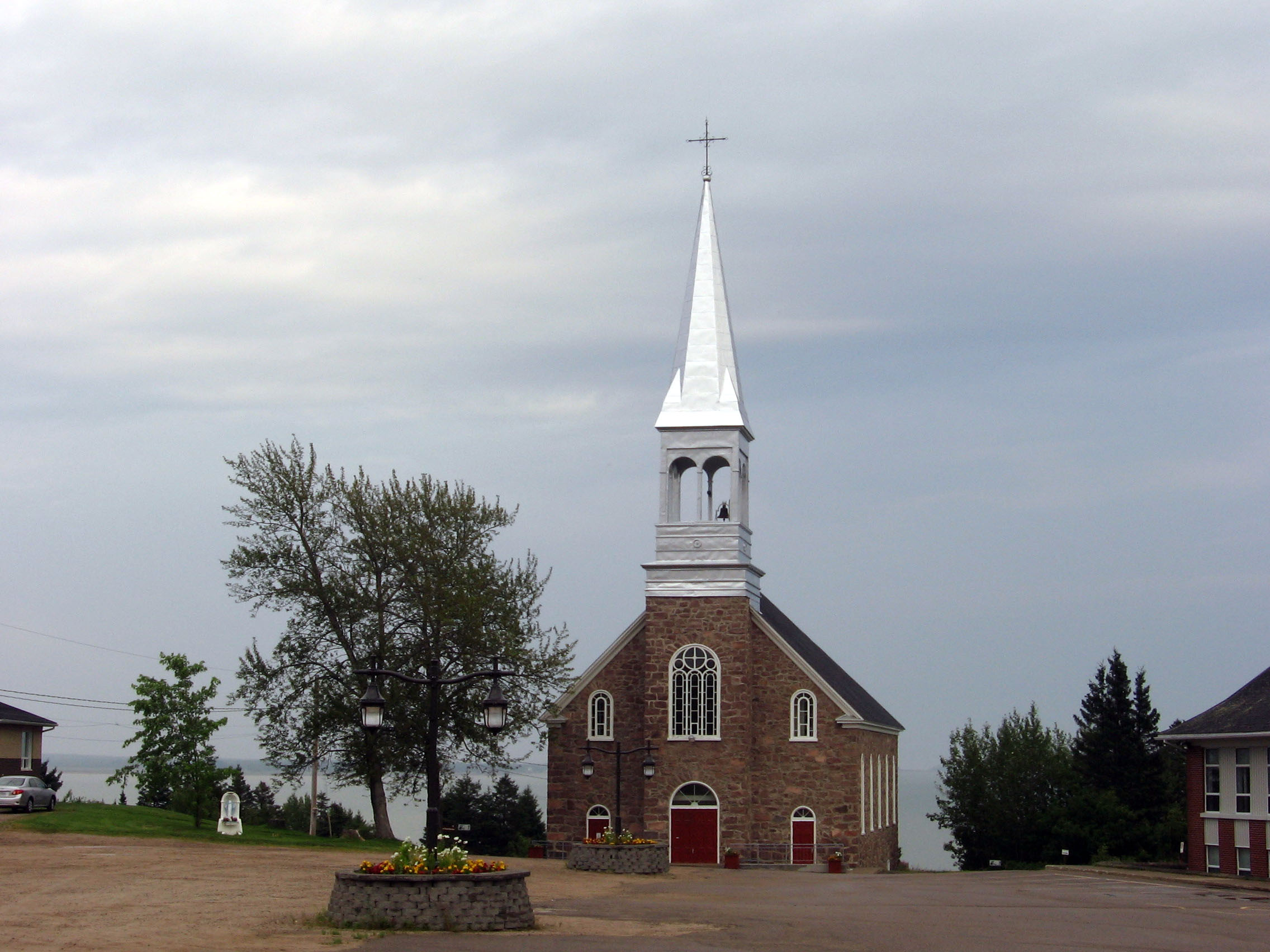
Saint-Paul-du-Nord

== Local government ==
List of former mayors:

- Mario Tremblay
- Donald Perron (2009–present)

== See also ==
- List of municipalities in Quebec
