= Colombier, Quebec =

Colombier
- Municipality
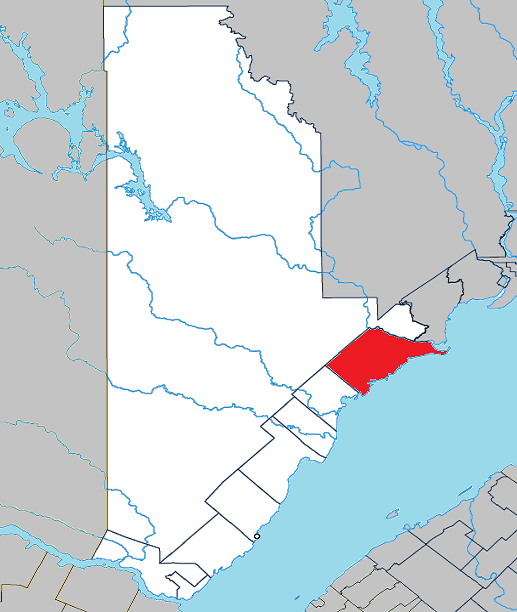
- Location within La Haute-Côte-Nord RCM

- Location in Côte-Nord region of Quebec
- Coordinates: 48°52′N 68°51′W
- Country: Canada
- Province: Quebec
- Region: Côte-Nord
- RCM: La Haute-Côte-Nord
- Constituted: January 1, 1946

Government
  - Mayor: Claire Savard
  - Federal riding: Côte-Nord—Kawawachikamach—Nitassinan
  - Prov. riding: René-Lévesque

Area
  - Total: 386.41 km^{2} (149.19 sq mi)
  - Land: 361.23 km^{2} (139.47 sq mi)

Population (2021)
  - Total: 635
  - Density: 1.8/km^{2} (4.7/sq mi)
  - Pop (2016-21): ▼7.3%
  - Dwellings: 363
- Time zone: UTC−5 (EST)
  - Summer (DST): UTC−4 (EDT)
- Postal code(s): G0H 1P0
- Area codes: 418 and 581
- Highways: R-138
- Website: municipalites-du-quebec.ca/colombier/

Colombier (French pronunciation: [kɔlɔ̃bje]) is a municipality in the Canadian province of Quebec, located in the Côte-Nord region and the regional county municipality of La Haute-Côte-Nord. It is located along Route 138, about 60 kilometres (37 mi) south-west of Baie-Comeau.

It includes the population centres of (Sainte-Thérèse-de-) Colombier, Les Îlets-Jérémie, and Saint-Marc-de-Latour.

== History ==
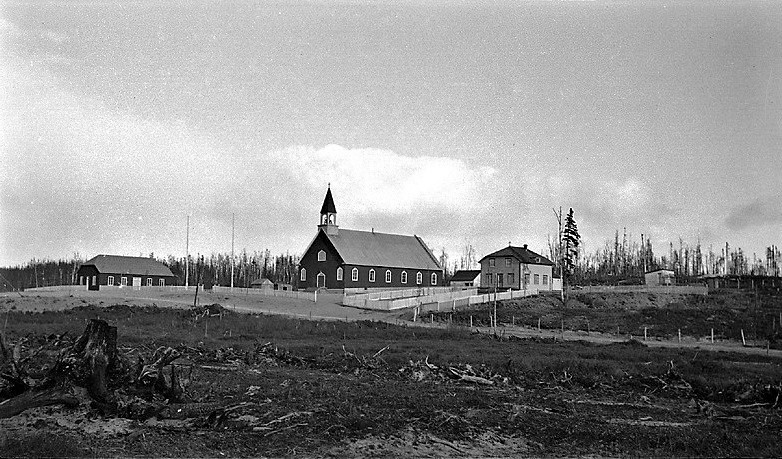
Colombier, 1944

While some logging took place in the middle of the 19th century, real impetus to its development was due to the economic crisis of the 1930s, when government authorities encouraged resettlement of the unemployed by opening the area for agriculture. In 1932, Saint-Marc-de-Latour was formed with the construction of a sawmill. In 1935, the Parish of Sainte-Thérèse-des-Colombiers was formed. Also that year, pioneers set up 20 camps and built the road along the Saint Lawrence River. In 1937, the post office opened, then designated as Rivière-Colombier, named after the Colombier River, a tributary of the St. Lawrence that flows through the municipality.

In 1946, the Municipality of Colombier was formed, named after the river, which in turn was named after Charles-Roger des Colombiers (1628-1687), fur trader, citizen and alderman of Quebec, who had been granted a fief in that territory in 1677.

== Demographics ==
Historical census populations – Colombier, Quebec

| Year | Pop. | ±% |
|---|---|---|
| 1951 | 1,374 | — |
| 1956 | 1,495 | +8.8% |
| 1961 | 1,619 | +8.3% |
| 1966 | 1,555 | −4.0% |
| 1971 | 1,337 | −14.0% |

| Year | Pop. | ±% |
|---|---|---|
| 1976 | 1,232 | −7.9% |
| 1981 | 1,213 | −1.5% |
| 1986 | 1,113 | −8.2% |
| 1991 | 973 | −12.6% |
| 1996 | 947 | −2.7% |

| Year | Pop. | ±% |
|---|---|---|
| 2001 | 890 | −6.0% |
| 2006 | 817 | −8.2% |
| 2011 | 747 | −8.6% |
| 2016 | 685 | −8.3% |
| 2021 | 635 | −7.3% |

Source: Statistics Canada

Private dwellings occupied by usual residents (2021): 324 (total dwellings: 363)

Mother tongue (2021):

- English as first language: 0%
- French as first language: 98.4%
- English and French as first language: 0%
- Other as first language: 1.6%

== See also ==
- List of municipalities in Quebec
