= Sault-au-Mouton, Quebec =

Coordinates: 48.534655°N 69.259445°W

Sault-au-Mouton is an unincorporated community in Quebec, Canada. It is recognized as a designated place by Statistics Canada.

== Demographics ==
In the 2021 Census of Population conducted by Statistics Canada, Sault-au-Mouton had a population of 451 living in 241 of its 277 total private dwellings, a change of -11.4% from its 2016 population of 509. With a land area of 4.7 km^{2} (1.8 sq mi), it had a population density of 96.0/km^{2} (248.5/sq mi) in 2021.

Historical census populations – Sault-au-Mouton

Year	Pop.	±%
1951	721	—
1956	873	+21.1%
1961	876	+0.3%
1966	940	+7.3%
1971	951	+1.2%

Year	Pop.	±%
1976	914	−3.9%
1981	828	−9.4%
1986	792	−4.3%
1991	702	−11.4%
1996	643	−8.4%

Source: Statistics Canada

== See also ==
- List of communities in Quebec
- List of designated places in Quebec
