= Lac-au-Brochet =

- Unorganized territory
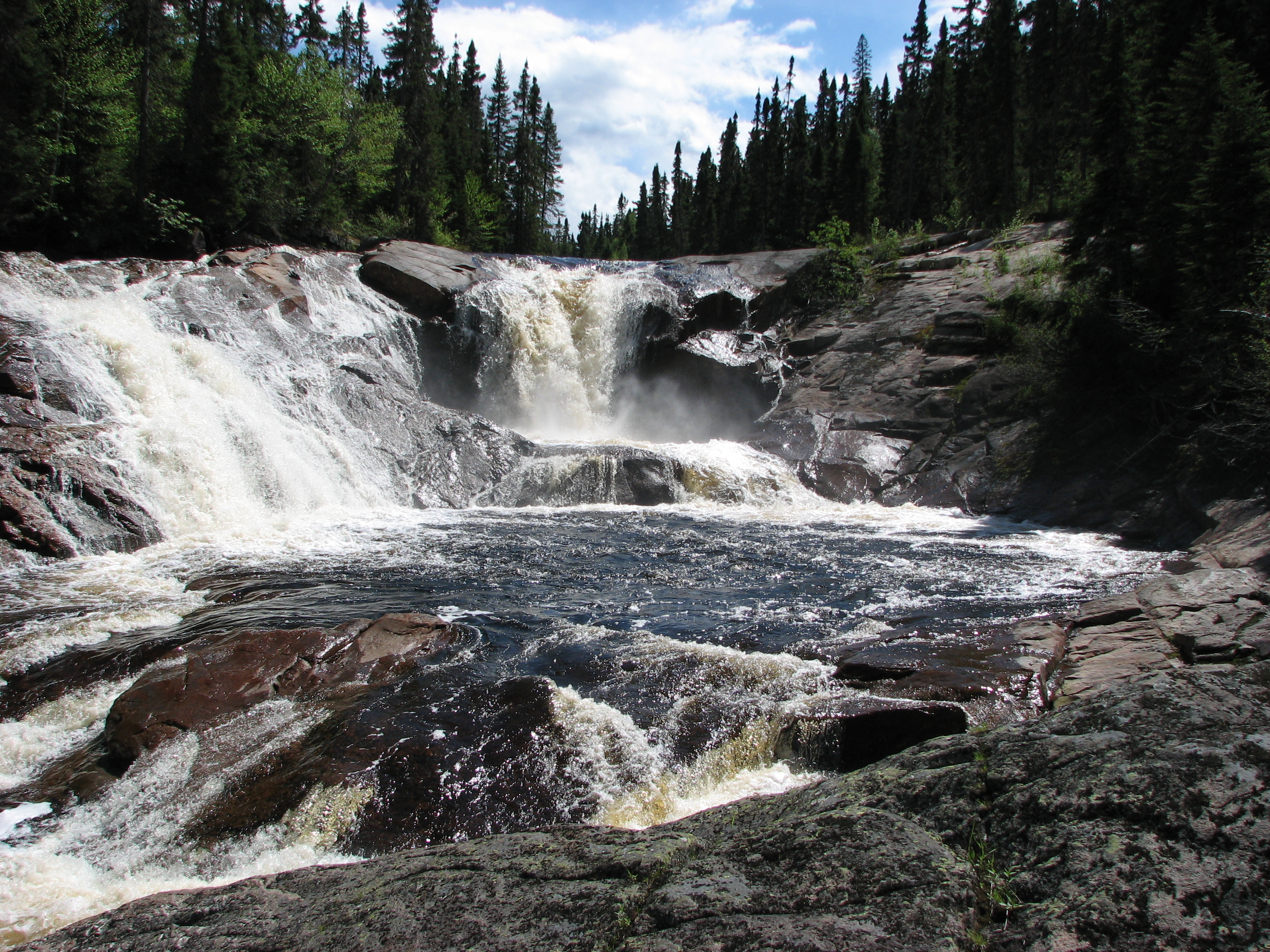
- Cascades on the Volant River

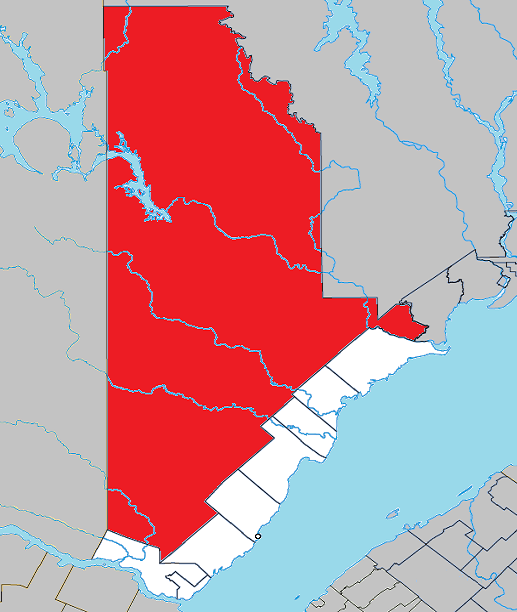
- Location within La Haute-Côte-Nord RCM

- Location in Côte-Nord region of Quebec
- Coordinates: 49°40′N 69°36′W
- Country: Canada
- Province: Quebec
- Region: Côte-Nord
- RCM: La Haute-Côte-Nord
- Constituted: January 1, 1986

Government
  - Federal riding: Côte-Nord—Kawawachikamach—Nitassinan
  - Prov. riding: René-Lévesque

Area
  - Total: 10,279.41 km^{2} (3,968.90 sq mi)
  - Land: 9,360.33 km^{2} (3,614.04 sq mi)

Population (2021)
  - Total: 0
  - Density: 0/km^{2} (0/sq mi)
  - Pop (2016-21): ▼100%
  - Dwellings: 7
- Time zone: UTC−5 (EST)
  - Summer (DST): UTC−4 (EDT)
- Highways: No major routes

Lac-au-Brochet (French pronunciation: [lak o bʁɔʃɛ]) is an unorganized territory in the Côte-Nord region of Quebec, Canada. It makes up over 83% of the La Haute-Côte-Nord Regional County Municipality.

The community of Labrieville (49°18′00″N 69°33′50″W) is located approximately in the centre of the territory along the Betsiamites River. Named after Napoléon-Alexandre Labrie, bishop of the Diocese of Golfe St-Laurent, it was established in the 1950s as a work camp to accommodate Hydro-Québec workers constructing the Bersimis-1 and Bersimis-2 generating stations. The company town was fully serviced with a hospital, hotel, bank, and shopping plaza. Upon completion of the hydro-electric facilities, Hydro-Québec tried to find another buyer for the town. But this proved unsuccessful, and they transferred most houses and businesses to Forestville in 1974. The community now serves as an access point to the Labrieville ZEC but doesn't have any permanent resident.

The eponymous Brochet Lake is about 20 kilometres (12 mi) north-east of the Pipmuacan Reservoir and just over 30 kilometres (19 mi) north of Labrieville. It has a surface area of nearly 45 square kilometres (17 sq mi), and is drained by the Brochet River, a tributary of the Betsiamites. Named after the northern pike (French: brochet), the Montagnais called it Tshinusheu Shakikan, also meaning Pike Lake.

== Demographics ==
Historical census populations – Lac-au-Brochet, Quebec
Year	Pop.	±%
1991	0	—
1996	3	—
2001	0	−100.0%
2006	0	0.00%
2011	0	0.00%
2016	5	—
2021	0	−100.0%
Source: Statistics Canada

== See also ==
- List of unorganized territories in Quebec
