= La Haute-Côte-Nord Regional County Municipality =

La Haute-Côte-Nord
- Regional county municipality
- Coordinates: 48°34′N 69°14′W
- Country: Canada
- Province: Quebec
- Region: Côte-Nord
- Effective: January 1, 1982
- County seat: Les Escoumins

Government
  - Type: Prefecture
  - Prefect: Micheline Anctil

Area
  - Total: 12,557.5 km^{2} (4,848.5 sq mi)
  - Land: 11,295.82 km^{2} (4,361.34 sq mi)
- Areas include native reserve

Population (2021)
  - Total: 10,278
  - Density: 0.9/km^{2} (2.3/sq mi)
  - Change (2016-21): ▼5.2%
  - Dwellings: 5,693
- Time zone: UTC−5 (EST)
  - Summer (DST): UTC−4 (EDT)
- Area codes: 418 and 581
- Website: www.mrchcn.qc.ca

La Haute-Côte-Nord (French pronunciation: [la ot kot nɔʁ]) is a regional county municipality in northeastern Quebec, Canada, in the Côte-Nord region. It is located on the Gulf of St. Lawrence where the Saguenay River flows into it. The seat is Les Escoumins. The municipality has a land area of 11,295.82 square kilometres (4,361.34 sq mi) and its population was 10,278 inhabitants as of the 2021 census. Its largest community is the city of Forestville.

Except for Sacré-Coeur, which is located along the Saguenay River, all places and municipalities of the RCM are along Quebec Route 138 directly on the shores of the St. Lawrence River. The unorganized territory of Lac-au-Brochet makes up some 83% of the interior part of the RCM.

== Subdivisions ==
There are 9 subdivisions and one native reserve within the RCM:

Cities & Towns (1)

- Forestville

Municipalities (6)

- Colombier
- Les Bergeronnes
- Les Escoumins
- Longue-Rive
- Portneuf-sur-Mer (formerly Sainte-Anne-de-Portneuf)
- Sacré-Coeur

Villages (1)

- Tadoussac

Unorganized Territory (1)

- Lac-au-Brochet

Native Reserves (1)
(not associated with RCM)

- Essipit

== Demographics ==
Canada census – La Haute-Côte-Nord RCM community profile

	2021	2016
Population	10,278 (-5.2% from 2016)	10,846 (-6.1% from 2011)
Land area	11,295.82 km^{2} (4,361.34 sq mi)	11,612.68 km^{2} (4,483.68 sq mi)
Population density	0.9/km^{2} (2.3/sq mi)	0.9/km^{2} (2.3/sq mi)
Median age	54.4 (M: 54.4, F: 55.2)	51.6 (M: 51.1, F: 52.0)
Private dwellings	5,693 (total) 5,023 (occupied)	5,708 (total) 4,982 (occupied)
Median household income	$60,400	$51,760

References: 2021 2016

Historical census populations – La Haute-Côte-Nord RCM
Year	Pop.	±%
1996	13,439	—
2001	12,894	−4.1%
2006	12,303	−4.6%
2011	11,546	−6.2%
2016	10,846	−6.1%
2021	10,278	−5.2%
Source: Statistics Canada

== Transportation ==
=== Access Routes ===
Highways and numbered routes that run through the municipality, including external routes that start or finish at the county border:

- Autoroutes
  - None
- Principal Highways
  - R-138
  - R-172
- Secondary Highways
  - None
- External Routes
  - None

== See also ==
- List of regional county municipalities and equivalent territories in Quebec
