= Forestville, Quebec =

Forestville
- City
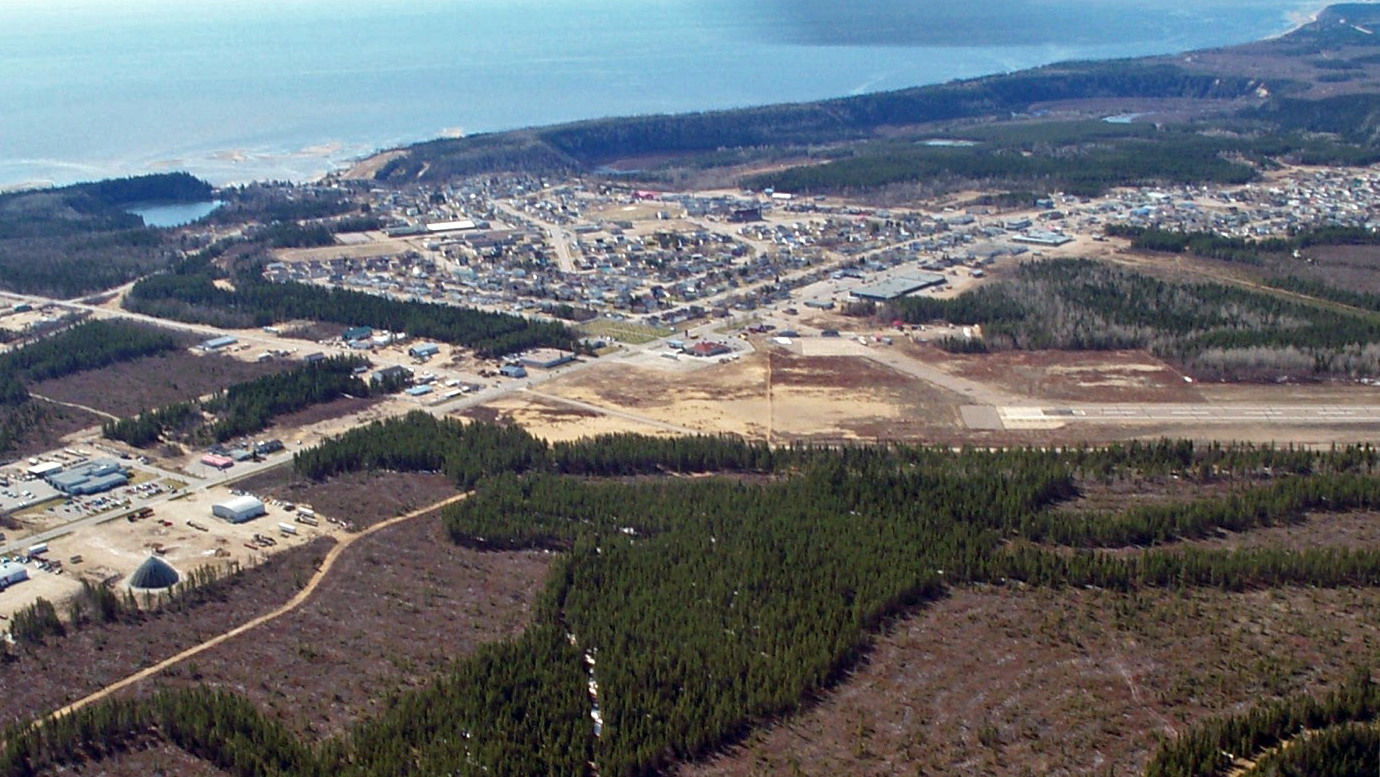
- Motto: Per sylvam ("Through the forest")
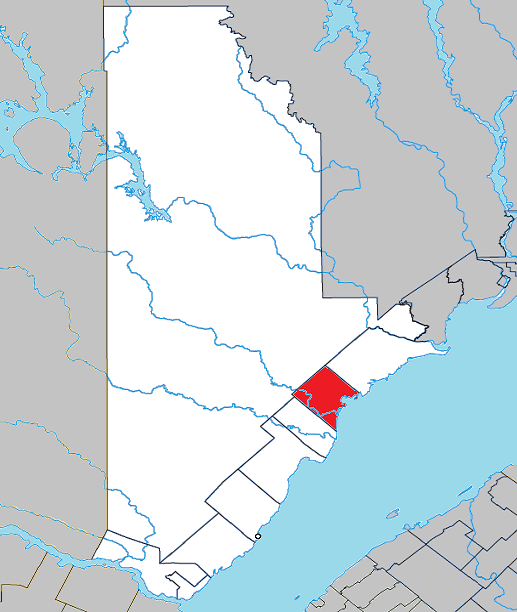
- Location within La Haute-Côte-Nord RCM

- Location in Côte-Nord region of Quebec
- Coordinates: 48°44′N 69°05′W
- Country: Canada
- Province: Quebec
- Region: Côte-Nord
- RCM: La Haute-Côte-Nord
- Settled: 1844
- Constituted: January 5, 1980

Government
  - Mayor: Micheline Anctil
  - Federal riding: Côte-Nord—Kawawachikamach—Nitassinan
  - Prov. riding: René-Lévesque

Area
  - Total: 244.42 km^{2} (94.37 sq mi)
  - Land: 192.61 km^{2} (74.37 sq mi)

Population (2021)
  - Total: 2,892
  - Density: 15/km^{2} (39/sq mi)
  - Pop (2016-21): ▼6.1%
  - Dwellings: 1,577
- Time zone: UTC−5 (EST)
  - Summer (DST): UTC−4 (EDT)
- Postal code(s): G0T 1E0
- Area codes: 418 and 581
- Highways: R-138 R-385
- Website: ville.forestville.ca

Forestville (French pronunciation: [fɔʁɛstvil]) is a town in the Côte-Nord region of Quebec, Canada. It is located on the north shore of the St. Lawrence River along Route 138, approximately 103 kilometres (64 mi) southwest of Baie-Comeau. There is a vehicle and passenger ferry service from Forestville to Rimouski, on the south shore of the St. Lawrence that is over 50 kilometres (31 mi) wide at this point. The city operates the Forestville Airport.

Forestville is known for its hunting and fishing. Moose hunting season is popular. There are many lakes and rivers to fish, as well as beaches and camping spots for the summer, and cross country skiing in the winter. It hosts the Boreal Loppet, a cross-country skiing race with varying distances including 60 kilometres (37 mi). It also hosted the longest cross-country ski race in the world, at 103 kilometres (64 mi), from 2005 to 2011.

== History ==
The area was well known to the First Nations, while the first European settlers arrived in 1844 following the construction of a sawmill by Edward Selvin, of Les Éboulements. In 1849, the mill was sold to William Price. One of the superintendents of the Price Company was Grant William Forrest (died November 15, 1878), after whom the new settlement was named. As written by Surveyor P.H. Dumais in 1873, the little village, "with its chapel and its windmills", was originally spelled Forrest-Ville, but the English version of his text showed the spelling Forestville. Being at the mouth of the Sault aux Cochons River, the place was also alternatively known as Sault-au-Cochon.

The Price Company owned large tracts of land in the area and prospered between 1870 and 1885, but went into decline about 1885, leading to the mill's closure in 1890. In 1937, the Forestville Post Office opened. That same year the forest industry was revitalized when the Anglo-Canadian Pulp & Paper Mills Company built a new mill, and in 1942, built the Arboriduc log flume that carried logs for several kilometers to the port at the mouth of the Sault aux Cochons River. Subsequently, the Town of Forestville and the Municipality of Saint-Luc-de-Laval were established in 1944 and in 1950 respectively.

In 1980, Forestville and Saint-Luc-de-Laval were merged to form the new Town of Forestville.

== Demographics ==
In the 2021 Census of Population conducted by Statistics Canada, Forestville had a population of 2,892 living in 1,476 of its 1,577 total private dwellings, a change of −6.1% from its 2016 population of 3,081. With a land area of 192.61 km^{2} (74.37 sq mi), it had a population density of 15.0/km^{2} (38.9/sq mi) in 2021.

Historical census populations – Forestville, Quebec

Year	Pop.	±%
1951	709	—
1956	1,117	+57.5%
1961	1,529	+36.9%
1966	1,572	+2.8%
1971	1,606	+2.2%

Year	Pop.	±%
1976	1,819	+13.3%
1981	4,271	+134.8%
1986	3,955	−7.4%
1991	3,946	−0.2%
1996	3,894	−1.3%

Year	Pop.	±%
2001	3,748	−3.7%
2006	3,543	−5.5%
2011	3,270	−7.7%
2016	3,081	−5.8%
2021	2,892	−6.1%

Population counts are not adjusted for boundary changes and mergers.
Source: Statistics Canada

Mother tongue (2021):

- English as first language: 0.2%
- French as first language: 99.3%
- English and French as first language: 0.2%
- Other as first language: 0.5%

== Climate ==
Forestville has a humid continental climate (Dfb under the Köppen climate classification). Summers are mild to warm and rainy with cool nights. Winters are long, frigid, and extremely snowy.

Climate data for Forestville
Month	Jan	Feb	Mar	Apr	May	Jun	Jul	Aug	Sep	Oct	Nov	Dec	Year
Record high °C (°F)	11 (52)	10 (50)	16.5 (61.7)	25 (77)	34.5 (94.1)	35 (95)	35 (95)	35.6 (96.1)	30 (86)	25 (77)	18.3 (64.9)	9.5 (49.1)	35.6 (96.1)
Mean daily maximum °C (°F)	−8.8 (16.2)	−6.4 (20.5)	−0.4 (31.3)	5.4 (41.7)	12.8 (55.0)	19.7 (67.5)	22.7 (72.9)	21.3 (70.3)	15.6 (60.1)	8.9 (48.0)	1.8 (35.2)	−5.7 (21.7)	7.2 (45.0)
Daily mean °C (°F)	−14 (7)	−11.7 (10.9)	−5.4 (22.3)	1.4 (34.5)	8.1 (46.6)	14.5 (58.1)	17.6 (63.7)	16.4 (61.5)	11 (52)	5 (41)	−1.7 (28.9)	−10.2 (13.6)	2.6 (36.7)
Mean daily minimum °C (°F)	−19.2 (−2.6)	−17.1 (1.2)	−10.4 (13.3)	−2.7 (27.1)	3.4 (38.1)	9.2 (48.6)	12.4 (54.3)	11.4 (52.5)	6.4 (43.5)	1 (34)	−5.1 (22.8)	−14.6 (5.7)	−2.1 (28.2)
Record low °C (°F)	−37.5 (−35.5)	−35.5 (−31.9)	−30.5 (−22.9)	−21 (−6)	−9.4 (15.1)	0 (32)	3.9 (39.0)	1 (34)	−4 (25)	−10.6 (12.9)	−22.2 (−8.0)	−34.5 (−30.1)	−37.5 (−35.5)
Average precipitation mm (inches)	75.1 (2.96)	64.2 (2.53)	75.5 (2.97)	100.5 (3.96)	105.9 (4.17)	104.2 (4.10)	109.1 (4.30)	99 (3.9)	94 (3.7)	95.8 (3.77)	79.7 (3.14)	81.1 (3.19)	1,084.1 (42.68)
Average rainfall mm (inches)	7.4 (0.29)	10.8 (0.43)	25.5 (1.00)	74.3 (2.93)	104.1 (4.10)	104.2 (4.10)	109.1 (4.30)	99 (3.9)	94 (3.7)	91.9 (3.62)	40.1 (1.58)	8.7 (0.34)	769.1 (30.28)
Average snowfall cm (inches)	67.7 (26.7)	53.4 (21.0)	50 (20)	26.2 (10.3)	1.8 (0.7)	0 (0)	0 (0)	0 (0)	0 (0)	3.9 (1.5)	39.6 (15.6)	72.4 (28.5)	315.1 (124.1)
Average precipitation days (≥ 0.2 mm)	11.7	9.5	10	11.8	14	14.7	15.6	13.8	13.6	13.4	12.4	13	153.5
Average rainy days (≥ 0.2 mm)	1.1	1.1	2.6	8.6	13.9	14.7	15.6	13.8	13.6	12.7	6	1.1	104.8
Average snowy days (≥ 0.2 cm)	11	8.7	7.8	4.5	0.42	0	0	0	0	1	7.3	12.2	52.92
Mean monthly sunshine hours	103.5	123.8	148.1	165	209.4	232.4	238.8	215	155.9	116.1	86.7	81.8	1,876.5
Source: Environment Canada

== See also ==
- List of cities in Quebec
