= Kénogamichiche Lake =

Lake in Canada

- Location in Quebec
- Location: Hébertville
- Coordinates: 48.36583°N 71.645°W
- Lake type: Natural
- Basin countries: Canada
- Max. length: 6.8 km (4.2 mi)
- Max. width: 0.8 km (0.50 mi)
- Surface elevation: 142 m (466 ft)

The lac Kénogamichiche is a freshwater body of the watershed of the La Belle Rivière and lac Saint-Jean, in the municipality of Hébertville, in the Lac-Saint-Jean-Est Regional County Municipality, in the administrative region of Saguenay–Lac-Saint-Jean, in the province of Quebec, in Canada.

The area around the lake is served by the route 169 which passes to the west and by the rang Saint-Isidore road (north shore), for the needs of recreational tourism activities, especially the resort.

Recreational and tourist activities, especially vacationing, are the main economic activities in this area; agriculture and forestry, second.

The surface of Lake Kénogamichiche is usually frozen from the beginning of December to the end of March, however the safe circulation on the ice is generally made from mid-December to mid-March.

== Geography ==
The main watersheds near Lake Kénogamichiche are:

- north side: Rivière des Aulnaies, Petite rivière Bédard, Rivière Bédard, Raquette River, La Petite Décharge;
- east side: Kenogami Lake, Pikauba River, Chicoutimi River, Bras des Angers, Rivière aux Sables, Cascouia River;
- south side: Vert Lake, La Belle Rivière, ruisseau L'Abbé, lac de la Belle Rivière, rivière du Milieu, Métabetchouane River;
- west side: Belle Rivière, Métabetchouane River, ruisseau de la Belle Rivière, Grignon River, Ouiatchouan River, lac Saint-Jean.

Lac Kénogamichiche has a length of 6.8 km (4.2 mi), a width of 0.8 km (0.50 mi) and an altitude of 142 m (466 ft). This lake is mainly fed by riparian streams, by the outlet (coming from the south) of Vert Lake and by the stream of the Floating Bridge (coming from the northeast). On the south side, this lake is separated from Vert Lake, by a strip of land with a width varying between 0.03 km (0.019 mi) and 0.26 km (0.16 mi), along the entire length of the lake. The mouth of this lake is located to the northeast, at:

- 5.2 km (3.2 mi) south-east of the confluence of the Rivière des Aulnaies;
- 1.6 km (0.99 mi) north-east of route 169;
- 7.6 km (4.7 mi) west of Kenogami Lake;
- 2.2 km (1.4 mi) south-east of the village center of Hébertville;
- 16.0 km (9.9 mi) east of lac Saint-Jean;
- 13.4 km (8.3 mi) south-east of the mouth of the La Belle Rivière;
- 18.4 km (11.4 mi) south of downtown Alma.

From the mouth of Lake Kénogamichiche, the current follows the course of the Aulnaies river consecutively on 5.9 km (3.7 mi) towards the northwest, the course of the Belle Rivière on 6.1 km (3.8 mi) towards the north-west (via a bay), then crosses the eastern part of Lac Saint-Jean towards the north on 15.4 km (9.6 mi), follows the course of the Saguenay river via the Petite Décharge on 172.3 km (107.1 mi) to Tadoussac where it merges with the Saint Lawrence estuary.

== Toponymy ==
This body of water is located in the hollow of a kettle formed following global warming 10,500 years ago, which followed a glaciation whose cover was about three kilometers thick. Located in the municipality of Hébertville, it is located on the old waterway that once connected the Saguenay to Lake Saint-Jean via Lake Kénogami. A 2 km (1.2 mi) plateau, where the Beau Portage lake is located, allows communication between these two lakes.

This toponym appears in the form Kinougamichis in the Jesuit Relations of 1672 under the pen of Father Albanel. This name turns out to be a diminutive of kenogami, meaning "small long lake". It was once famous for the multitude of long-tailed frogs that inhabited it and made a continuous croaking. In addition, various spellings have been inventoried for this toponym, including Kinogamichiche, Kinougamisis, Tshnuagamitshish, etc.

The toponym "lac Kénogamichiche" was formalized on September 5, 1968, by the Commission de toponymie du Québec.

== Appendices ==
=== Related articles ===
- Lac-Saint-Jean-Est Regional County Municipality
- Hébertville, a municipality
- Saguenay River
- Lac Saint-Jean
- La Belle Rivière
- Rivière des Aulnaies
- Lac Vert
- List of lakes in Canada
