= Bruyère River =

- Location within Quebec

Location
- Country: Canada
- Province: Quebec
- Region: Saguenay-Lac-Saint-Jean
- Regional County Municipality: Le Fjord-du-Saguenay Regional County Municipality
- City and municipality: Saguenay (city) and Larouche

Physical characteristics
- Source: Lac Potvin
  - location: Larouche
  - coordinates: 48.422354°N 71.44690°W
  - elevation: 184
- Mouth: Saguenay River
  - location: Larouche
  - coordinates: 48.46333°N 71.52222°W
  - elevation: 150 m (490 ft)
- Length: 12.4 km (7.7 mi)
- Discharge
  - location: Larouche

Basin features
- Tributaries
  - left: Discharge from the Hippolyte and Aqueduc lakes
  - right: Discharge from Ovila lake

The Bruyère river is a river in Quebec, Canada. It is a tributary of the Dorval River, flowing in the municipality of Larouche, in the Le Fjord-du-Saguenay Regional County Municipality, in the administrative region of Saguenay–Lac-Saint-Jean.

The Bruyère river valley is mainly served by the route 170 (boulevard du Royaume), for forestry and agriculture.

Forestry is the main economic activity in the Bruyère River area; agricultural activities, second.

The surface of the Bruyère River is usually frozen from the beginning of December to the end of March, however the safe circulation on the ice is generally made from mid-December to mid-March.

== Geography ==
The main watersheds near the Bruyère river are:

- north side: Dorval River, Saguenay River;
- east side: Dorval River, Saguenay River, rivière aux Sables, Chicoutimi River;
- south side: Kenogami Lake (Cascouia bay), Cascouia River, Pont Flottant stream, Pikauba River, ruisseau L'Abbé;
- west side: Raquette River, Abattoir stream, Bédard River, Lac Saint-Jean.

The Bruyère river rises at Lake Potvin (length: 2.0 km (1.2 mi); altitude: 184 m (604 ft)) in the shape of a deformed crescent open to the north. This source is located at:

- 1.5 km (0.93 mi) south of the ex-Moquin station along the Canadian National Railway;
- 1.5 km (0.93 mi) south of the Dorval River;
- 1.7 km (1.1 mi) south-east of route 170;
- 6.3 km (3.9 mi) south-east of the village center of Larouche;
- 7.3 km (4.5 mi) south-east of the confluence of the Bruyère and Dorval rivers;
- 7.3 km (4.5 mi) south of the Saguenay River;
- 12.7 km (7.9 mi) south-east of the confluence of the Dorval and Saguenay rivers.

From its source (small unidentified lake), the Bruyère river flowed on 12.4 km (7.7 mi) with a drop of 34 km (21 mi) generally in forested area, sometimes agricultural, according to the segments following:

- 2.1 km (1.3 mi) north-west, bending north, to the Canadian National Railway;
- 7.0 km (4.3 mi) westward along the Canadian National Railway and route 170 to a bend in the river;
- 3.3 km (2.1 mi) towards the northwest by bending towards the north, until the mouth of the river.

The course of the Bruyère river flows into a bend on the south bank of the Dorval River. This confluence is located at:

- 0.8 km (0.50 mi) northeast of a curve in route 170;
- 5.9 km (3.7 mi) south of the Saguenay River;
- 6.3 km (3.9 mi) north-west of Cascouia Bay;
- 6.5 km (4.0 mi) south-east of the confluence of the Dorval and Saguenay rivers;
- 12.7 km (7.9 mi) south-east of downtown Alma;
- 19.5 km (12.1 mi) east of lac Saint-Jean.

From the mouth of the Bruyère river, the current follows the course of the Dorval river on 26.2 km (16.3 mi) towards the northwest, then the course of the Saguenay River on 123 km (76 mi) east to Tadoussac where it merges with the Saint Lawrence estuary.

== Toponymy ==
The toponym "Bruyère river" was formalized on January 8, 1981, at the Place Names Bank of the Commission de toponymie du Québec.

== Appendices ==
=== Related articles ===
- Le Fjord-du-Saguenay Regional County Municipality
- Larouche, a municipality
- Dorval River
- Saguenay River
- List of rivers of Quebec
