= Rivière du Lac Onésime =

- Location within Quebec

Location
- Country: Canada
- Province: Quebec
- Region: Saguenay-Lac-Saint-Jean
- Regional County Municipality: Le Fjord-du-Saguenay Regional County Municipality
- City: Saguenay (city)

Physical characteristics
- Source: Lac Onésime
  - location: Saguenay (city)
  - coordinates: 48.48055°N 71.4075°W
  - elevation: 169
- Mouth: Saguenay River
  - location: Saguenay (city)
  - coordinates: 48.48055°N 71.4075°W
  - elevation: 67 m (220 ft)
- Length: 2.5 km (1.6 mi)
- Discharge
  - location: Saguenay (city)

The Rivière du Lac Onésime is a tributary of the Saguenay River, flowing in the city of Saguenay (city), in the administrative region of Saguenay–Lac-Saint-Jean, in the province of Quebec, in Canada.

The Lac Onésime river valley is served by Wilbrod Road, Saint-André Road and Montée Duperré, mainly for the needs of forestry and agriculture.

Agriculture is the main economic activity in the Onésime lake river area; forestry, second.

The surface of the Lac Onésime river is usually frozen from the beginning of December to the end of March, however the safe circulation on the ice is generally made from mid-December to mid-March.

== Geography ==
The main watersheds neighboring the "rivière du Lac Onésime" are:

- north side: Saguenay River;
- east side: Savane brook, rivière aux Sables, Chicoutimi River;
- south side: Dorval River, Potvin lake, Charnois lake, Cascouia River, Kenogami Lake;
- west side: Dupéré stream, Dorval River, Bédard River, Rouge stream, Lac Saint-Jean.

The Lac Onésime river rises at Lac Onésime (length: 0.7 km (0.43 mi); altitude: 169 m (554 ft)) in the municipality of Larouche . From its source (Onésime lake), the "rivière du Lac Onésime" flows north over 2.5 km (1.6 mi) with a drop of 102 m (335 ft) in forest and agricultural areas. The course of this stream couples Saint-Wilbrod Road and Saint-André Road.

The course of the river Onésime flows into the bottom of Anse à Brillant on the south bank of the Saguenay River. This confluence is located at:

- 0.8 km (0.50 mi) south of the north shore of the Saguenay River;
- 5.2 km (3.2 mi) north of route 170;
- 10.8 km (6.7 mi) downstream of the confluence of the Dorval and Saguenay rivers;
- 13.6 km (8.5 mi) north-west of Jonquière town center;
- 18.8 km (11.7 mi) east of downtown Alma.

From the mouth of the Lac Onésime river, the current follows the course of the Saguenay River for 112 km (70 mi) east to Tadoussac where it merges with the Saint Lawrence estuary.

== Toponymy ==
The term "Onésime" is a first name of French origin.

The toponym “Rivière du Lac Onésime” was formalized on August 28, 1980, at the Place Names Bank of the Commission de toponymie du Québec.

== Appendices ==
=== Related articles ===
- Saguenay (city), a city
- Saguenay River
- List of rivers of Quebec
