= Raquette River (Bédard River tributary) =

- Location within Quebec

Location
- Country: Canada
- Province: Quebec
- Region: Saguenay-Lac-Saint-Jean
- Regional County Municipality: Lac-Saint-Jean-Est Regional County Municipality
- City: Larouche et Hébertville

Physical characteristics
- Source: Lac Raquette
  - location: Larouche
  - coordinates: 48.44800°N 71.54161°W
  - elevation: 159
- Mouth: Bédard River
  - location: Hébertville
  - coordinates: 48.50833°N 71.67555°W
  - elevation: 110 m (360 ft)
- Length: 14.3 km (8.9 mi)
- Discharge
  - location: Alma

The Raquette River is a tributary of the Bédard River, flowing in the municipalities of Larouche (MRC du Le Fjord-du-Saguenay Regional County Municipality) and Hébertville (MRC de Lac-Saint-Jean-Est Regional County Municipality), in the administrative region of Saguenay–Lac-Saint-Jean, in the province of Quebec, in Canada.

The Raquette river valley is served by route 169, route 170, chemin du 6e rang Nord, chemin du 7e rang Sud, chemin du 8e rang Sud and chemin du 9e rang Sud, especially for forestry and agriculture.

Agriculture is the main economic activity in the Raquette River area; forestry, second.

The surface of the Raquette River is usually frozen from the beginning of December to the end of March, however the safe circulation on the ice is generally done from mid-December to mid-March.

== Geography ==
The main watersheds adjacent to the Raquette River are:

- north side: Rouge stream, Bédard river, La Petite Décharge, Saguenay River;
- east side: Aqueduct lake, Dorval River, Charnois lake, rivière aux Sables, Chicoutimi River;
- south side: Cascouia bay, Cascouia River, Kénogamichiche Lake, la Belle Rivière, Rivière des Aulnaies, Vert Lake, Kenogami Lake;
- west side: Bédard River, Grandmont stream, Belle Rivière, Rivière des Aulnaies, Lac Saint-Jean.

The Raquette River originates at Raquette Lake (length: 0.4 km (0.25 mi); altitude: 159 m (522 ft)) in the municipality of Larouche. This source is located at:

- 1.4 km (0.87 mi) south of route 170;
- 1.4 km (0.87 mi) east of the village center of Larouche;
- 4.7 km (2.9 mi) northwest of Cascouia Bay (integrated into Kenogami Lake);
- 8.3 km (5.2 mi) south of the Saguenay River;
- 12.0 km (7.5 mi) south-east of the confluence of the Raquette river and the Bédard rivers.

From its source (Raquette Lake), the Raquette River flows over 14.3 km (8.9 mi) with a drop of 51 km (32 mi) in the forest zone over 0.8 km (0.50 mi) in the upper part and generally agricultural for the lower part, according to the following segments:

- 5.6 km (3.5 mi) west between the Canadian National railway (south side) and route 170 (north side), crossing the 9th range south road and the road from 8th range South, to the latter's road bridge;
- 2.8 km (1.7 mi) north-west by crossing the road from 7th range North to 6th range North;
- 4.3 km (2.7 mi) north-west passing under the railway and crossing the Saint-Alphonse road, up to route 169;
- 1.6 km (0.99 mi) towards the northwest by forming a ball towards the northeast, until the mouth of the river.

The course of the Raquette river flows on the south bank of the Bédard river, in agricultural area. This confluence is located at:

- 1.3 km (0.81 mi) southwest of the Canadian National Railway;
- 4.3 km (2.7 mi) north-west of the village center of Hébertville;
- 4.4 km (2.7 mi) south of downtown Alma;
- 8.3 km (5.2 mi) south of the Isle-Maligne dam;
- 6.4 km (4.0 mi) south-east of the confluence of the Bédard and Saguenay rivers.

From the mouth of the Raquette river, the current follows the course of the Bédard river on 11.5 km (7.1 mi) towards the northwest, then the course of the Saguenay river on 139 km (86 mi) east to Tadoussac where it merges with the Saint Lawrence estuary.

== Toponymy ==
The toponym “Raquette river” was formalized on August 28, 1980, at the Place Names Bank of the Commission de toponymie du Québec.

== Appendices ==
=== Related articles ===
- Le Fjord-du-Saguenay Regional County Municipality
- Lac-Saint-Jean-Est Regional County Municipality
- Larouche, a municipality
- Bédard River
- Saguenay River
- List of rivers of Quebec
