= Petite rivière Bédard =

- Location within Quebec

Location
- Country: Canada
- Province: Quebec
- Region: Saguenay-Lac-Saint-Jean
- Regional County Municipality: Lac-Saint-Jean-Est Regional County Municipality
- City: Larouche, Hébertville et Alma

Physical characteristics
- Source: Unidentified little lake
  - location: Larouche
  - coordinates: 48.39728°N 71.59592°W
  - elevation: 181
- Mouth: Bédard River
  - location: Hébertville
  - coordinates: 48.43444°N 71.64833°W
  - elevation: 160 m (520 ft)
- Length: 7.9 km (4.9 mi)
- Discharge
  - location: Alma

The petite rivière Bédard is a tributary of the Bédard River, flowing in the municipalities of Larouche (MRC of Le Fjord-du-Saguenay Regional County Municipality) and Hébertville (MRC of Lac-Saint-Jean-Est Regional County Municipality), in the administrative region of Saguenay–Lac-Saint-Jean, in the province of Quebec, in Canada.

The petite rivière Bédard valley is served by chemin du rang Saint-Pierre, chemin du petit rang Saint-Pierre and chemin du rang Saint-Charles, for its two main industries, forestry and agriculture.

The surface of the river is usually frozen from the beginning of December to the end of March, though not safe for travel in the first and last two weeks.

== Geography ==
The main watersheds neighboring the petite rivière Bédard are:

- North side: Bédard River, Raquette River, la Petite Décharge (La Grosse Décharge), Saguenay River;
- Nast side: Bédard River, Cascouia River, Cascouia bay, Kenogami Lake, rivière aux Sables River, Chicoutimi River;
- South side: La Belle Rivière (Lac Saint-Jean), Rivière des Aulnaies, Vert Lake;
- West side: Couchepaganiche East River, La Belle Rivière (Lac Saint-Jean), Rivière des Aulnaies, lac Saint-Jean.

The Petite rivière Bédard rises at an unidentified small lake (length: 0.3 km (0.19 mi); altitude: 181 m (594 ft)) in the municipality of Larouche. This source is located at:

- 4.2 km (2.6 mi) west of Cascouia Bay (integrated into Kenogami Lake);
- 5.7 km (3.5 mi) southeast of the confluence of the Petite Bédard and Bédard rivers;
- 6.6 km (4.1 mi) south of the Canadian National railway;
- 7.0 km (4.3 mi) south of route 170;
- 7.7 km (4.8 mi) southwest of the center of the village of Larouche;
- 15.2 km (9.4 mi) south of the Saguenay River.

From its source (small unidentified lake), the Petite rivière Bédard flows over 7.9 km (4.9 mi) with a drop of 21 km (13 mi) generally in the forest zone in the upper part and in agriculture for the lower part, according to the following segments:

- 2.3 km (1.4 mi) toward the northwest by forming a curve toward the south, up to a stream (coming from the north);
- 2.8 km (1.7 mi) westward, up to a curve of the river;
- 2.8 km (1.7 mi) northwest, to the mouth of the river.

The course of the Petite Bédard River flows onto the south bank of the Bédard River, in agricultural area. This confluence is located at:

- 1.2 km (0.75 mi) southeast of the Canadian National railway;
- 1.6 km (0.99 mi) east of the village of Hébertville;
- 9.2 km (5.7 mi) west of Cascouia Bay of Kenogami Lake;
- 12.1 km (7.5 mi) southeast of downtown Alma;
- 16.0 km (9.9 mi) southeast of Isle-Maligne dam;
- 16.6 km (10.3 mi) southeast of the confluence of Lac Saint-Jean and the Saguenay River (i.e. at the entrance to La Petite Décharge).

From the mouth of petite rivière Bédard, the current follows the course of the Saguenay River for 139 km (86 mi) east to Tadoussac where it merges with the Saint Lawrence estuary.

== Toponymy ==
The toponym “petite rivière Bédard” was formalized on August 28, 1980, at the Place Names Bank of the Commission de toponymie du Québec.

== Appendices ==
=== Related articles ===
- Le Fjord-du-Saguenay Regional County Municipality
- Lac-Saint-Jean-Est Regional County Municipality
- Larouche, a municipality
- Bédard River
- Saguenay River
- List of rivers of Quebec
