= Vert Lake (Hébertville) =

Lake in Hébertville, Quebec, Canada

- Location in Quebec
- Location: Hébertville
- Coordinates: 48.36583°N 71.645°W
- Lake type: Natural
- Basin countries: Canada
- Max. length: 3.6 km (2.2 mi)
- Max. width: 0.75 km (0.47 mi)
- Surface elevation: 142 m (466 ft)

Lac Vert is a freshwater body of the watershed of Belle Rivière and Lac Saint-Jean, in the municipality of Hébertville, in the Lac-Saint-Jean-Est Regional County Municipality, in the administrative region of Saguenay–Lac-Saint-Jean, in the province of Quebec, in Canada.

The area around the lake is served by the route 169 which passes to the west, by the rang Saint-Isidore road (north shore) and by the rang du Lac Vert road (south shore), for the needs of recreational tourism activities, especially vacationing.

Recreational and tourist activities, especially vacationing, are the main economic activities in this area; agriculture and forestry, second.

The surface of Lac Vert is usually frozen from the beginning of December to the end of March, however the safe circulation on the ice is generally done from mid-December to mid-March.

== Geography ==
The main watersheds near Lac Vert are:

- north side: Kénogamichiche Lake, Rivière des Aulnaies, Petite rivière Bédard, Bédard River, Raquette River, La Petite Décharge;
- east side: Kénogamichiche Lake, Kenogami Lake, Pikauba River, Chicoutimi River, Bras des Angers, rivière aux Sables, Cascouia River;
- south side: La Belle Rivière, ruisseau L'Abbé, lac de la Belle Rivière, rivière du Milieu, Métabetchouane River;
- west side: La Belle Rivière, Métabetchouane River, ruisseau de la Belle Rivière, Grignon River, Ouiatchouan River, Lac Saint-Jean.

Lac Vert has a length of 3.6 km (2.2 mi), a width of 0.75 km (0.47 mi) and an altitude of 142 m (466 ft). This lake is mainly fed by riparian streams. On the north side, this lake is separated from Kénogamichiche Lake, by a strip of land with a width varying between 0.03 km (0.019 mi) and 0.26 km (0.16 mi), along the entire length of the lake. The mouth of this lake is located to the northeast, at:

- 0.8 km (0.50 mi) south-west of the bridge spanning Kénogamichiche Lake;
- 3.6 km (2.2 mi) north-east of route 169;
- 4.5 km (2.8 mi) west of Kenogami Lake;
- 5.3 km (3.3 mi) east of the village center of Hébertville;
- 19.6 km (12.2 mi) east of Lac Saint-Jean;
- 30.9 km (19.2 mi) west of the barrage de Portage-des-Roches;
- 19.9 km (12.4 mi) south of downtown Alma;
- 41.1 km (25.5 mi) south-west of the confluence of the Chicoutimi River and the Saguenay River.

From the mouth of Lac Vert, the current crosses Kénogamichiche Lake on3.2 km (2.0 mi) to the west, then follows the course of the Rivière des Aulnaies on 5.9 km (3.7 mi) north-west, the course of La Belle Rivière on 6.1 km (3.8 mi) north-west (via a bay), then crosses the eastern part of Lac Saint-Jean toward north on 15.4 km (9.6 mi), follows the Saguenay river via the Petite Décharge on 172.3 km (107.1 mi) to Tadoussac where it merges with the Saint Lawrence estuary.

== Toponymy ==
The toponym "Lac Vert" was formalized on September 23, 1975, by the Commission de toponymie du Québec.

== Appendices ==
=== Related articles ===
- Lac-Saint-Jean-Est Regional County Municipality
- Hébertville, a municipality
- Saguenay River
- Lac Saint-Jean
- La Belle Rivière
- Rivière des Aulnaies
- Kénogamichiche Lake
- List of lakes in Canada
