= La Petite Décharge =

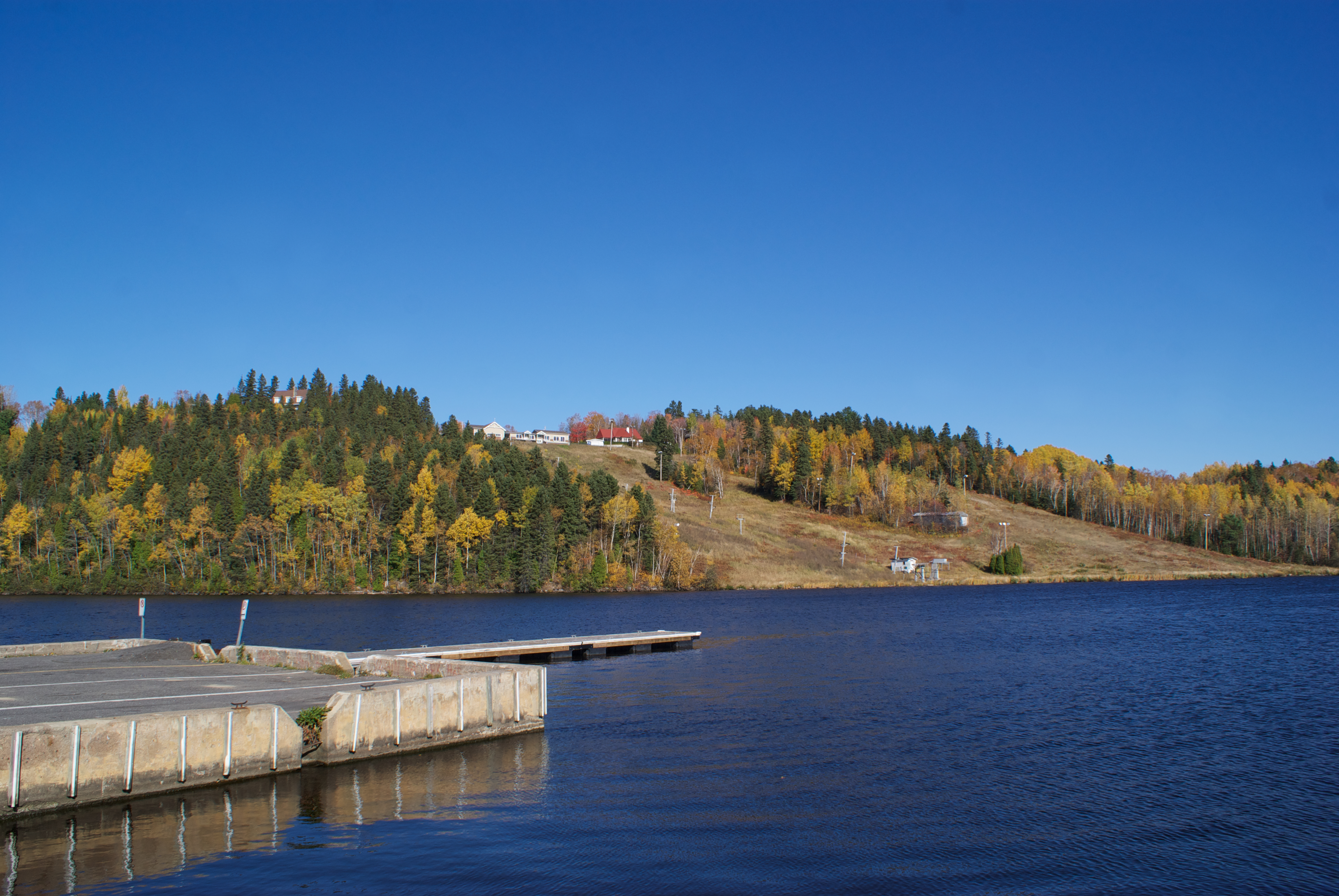

- Location within Quebec

Location
- Country: Canada
- Province: Quebec
- Region: Saguenay-Lac-Saint-Jean
- Regional County Municipality: Le Fjord-du-Saguenay Regional County Municipality
- City: Alma

Physical characteristics
- Source: Lac Saint-Jean
  - location: Alma
  - coordinates: 48.565113°N 71.759434°W
  - elevation: 101
- Mouth: Saguenay River
  - location: Alma
  - coordinates: 48.538936°N 71.616268°W
  - elevation: 68 m (223 ft)
- Length: 16.2 km (10.1 mi)
- Discharge
  - location: Larouche

Basin features
- Tributaries
  - left: (from the mouth) Ruisseau Rouge, Bédard River.

La Petite Décharge is the name of one of the two emissaries of lac Saint-Jean, the other being the La Grande Décharge. This river flows south of Alma Island, on the northwest shore of St. Lawrence River, in the town of Alma, in the Lac-Saint-Jean-Est Regional County Municipality, in the administrative region of Saguenay-Lac-Saint-Jean, in the Province of Quebec, in Canada.

La Petite Décharge marks the southern limit of Alma Island. To the east of this island, the two emissaries meet and form the Saguenay River at their confluence.

The main economic activities are urban (i.e. the city of Alma), industrial and recreational tourism.

La Petite Décharge is served on the north side by Mélançon-Ouest and Maurice boulevards. Paradis, as well as by the streets built on Alma Island; on the south side by Chemin du Golf, Scott Street West, Boulevard des Cascades, Rue Sacré-Coeur East and Boulevard Auger East.

The surface of La Petite Décharge is usually frozen from the end of November to the beginning of April, however the safe circulation on the ice is generally done from mid-December to the end of March.

== Geography ==
With a length of 16.2 kilometers, the Petite Décharge is dotted with rapids all along its route.

The main watersheds neighboring the Petite Décharge are:

- North side: La Grande Décharge, Rivière aux Chicots, Rivière aux Harts, Mistouk River;
- East side: Saguenay River;
- South side: Bédard River;
- West side: lac Saint-Jean.

La Petite Décharge is the second emissary of lac Saint-Jean whose mouth is located in the town of Alma, at:

- 11.0 km (6.8 mi) West of the mouth of La Petite Décharge;
- 8.8 km (5.5 mi) West of downtown Alma.

From its source, the Little Landfill flows over 16.2 km (10.1 mi) in a forest, then an urban area, according to the following segments:

- 3.2 km (2.0 mi) towards the East, then the North in a widening of the river, up to a bend of the river corresponding to the outlet of Lake Sophie (coming from the North);
- 3.2 km (2.0 mi) towards the South-East, until the confluence of the Bédard River (Saguenay River) (coming from the South);
- 7.6 km (4.7 mi) towards the east passing in the town of Alma passing under a first road bridge, under the railway bridge, a second road bridge, up to at the bridge at route 169;
- 2.2 km (1.4 mi) to the east, crossing the Alma Hydrobase area to the mouth of the river.

La Petite Décharge spills out at the eastern tip of Alma Island, coinciding with the confluence of La Grande Décharge (coming from the North-West). The latter is crossed to the east by the Saguenay River. This mouth is located at:

- 2.1 km (1.3 mi) east of downtown Alma;
- 4.4 km (2.7 mi) South-East of the Maligne Island hydroelectric plant;
- 35.3 km (21.9 mi) West of downtown Saguenay (city);
- 63.0 km (39.1 mi) West of the mouth of the Saguenay River.

== Image gallery ==
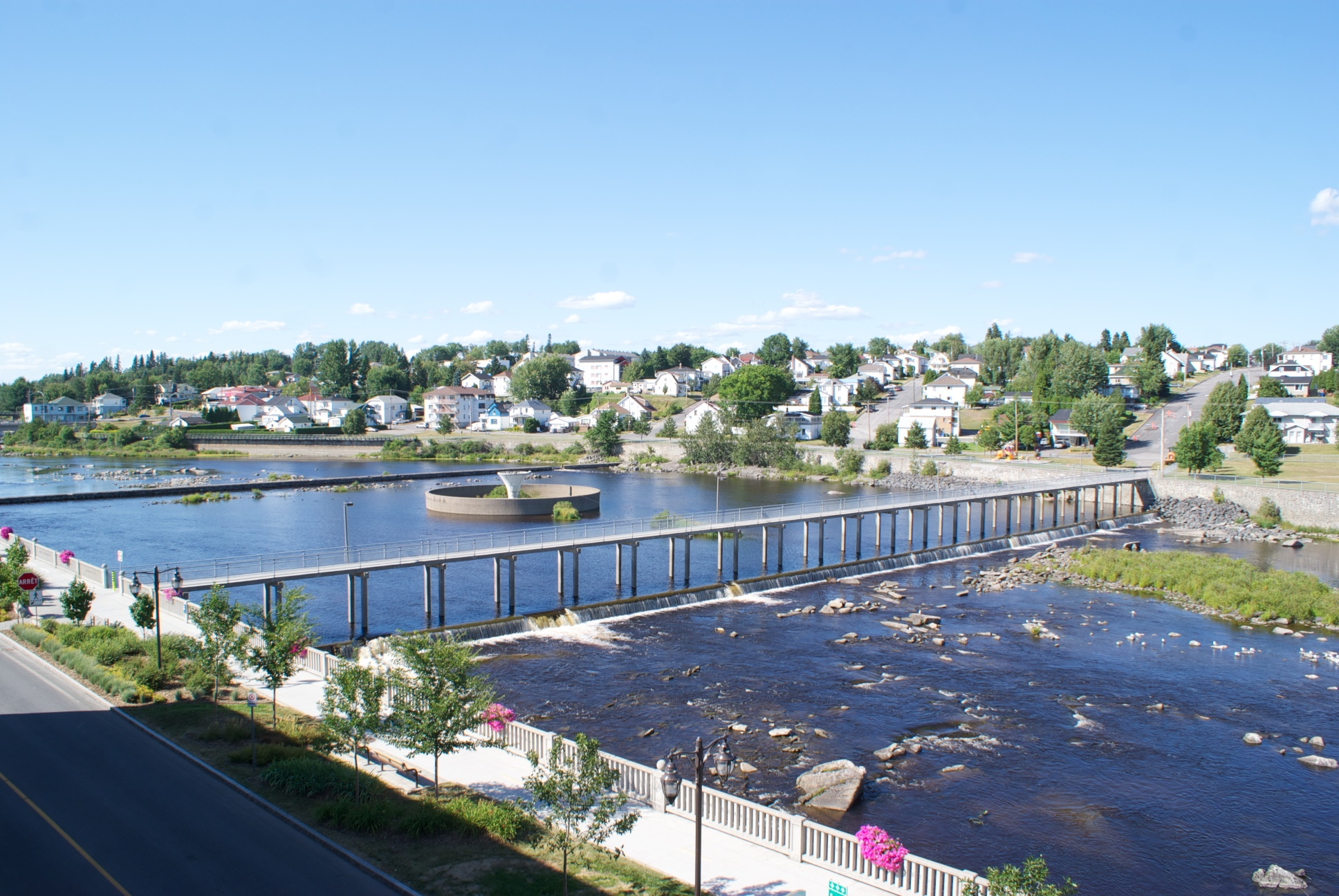
Passerelle du centenaire

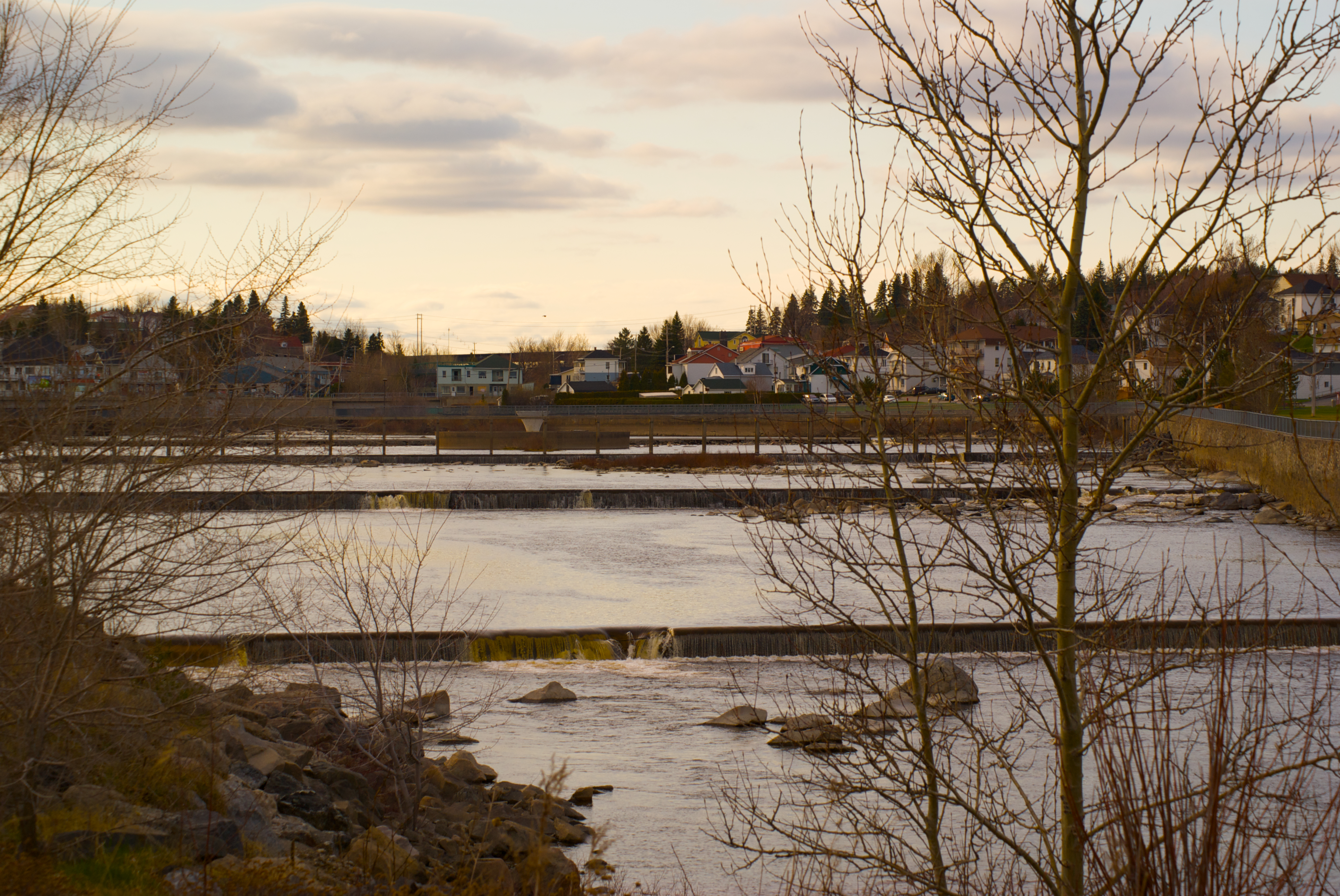
Les paliers de la Petite Décharge

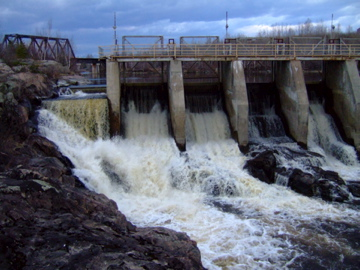
Barrage sur la rivière la Petite-Décharge

== Toponymy ==
This toponym is pointed out by the surveyor Edmond Duberger in a report of April 29, 1861 in Quebec, probably dates from the 18th century.

The toponym of "La Petite Décharge" was formalized on December 5, 1968, at the Place Names Bank of the Commission de toponymie du Québec.

== Appendices ==
=== Related articles ===
- Alma, a city
- Lac-Saint-Jean-Est Regional County Municipality
- Saguenay River, a stream
- La Grande Décharge, a stream
- Lac Saint-Jean, a body of water
- Alma Island
- Maligne Island hydroelectric plant
- List of rivers of Quebec

=== Bibliography ===
- The memory of Quebec, 1188
