= Rivière du Milieu (lac de la Belle Rivière) =

- Location within Quebec

Location
- Country: Canada
- Province: Quebec
- Region: Saguenay-Lac-Saint-Jean
- Regional County Municipality: Lac-Saint-Jean-Est Regional County Municipality
- Municipalities: Belle-Rivière

Physical characteristics
- Source: Lac Morelle
  - location: Belle-Rivière
  - coordinates: 48.07199°N 71.74222°W
  - elevation: 444
- Mouth: la Belle Rivière
  - location: Belle-Rivière
  - coordinates: 48.23028°N 71.72916°W
  - elevation: 346 m (1,135 ft)
- Length: 23.2 km (14.4 mi)
- Discharge
  - location: Belle-Rivière

Basin features
- Tributaries
  - left: (from the mouth) Discharge of lac Loriset, discharge of lac Binet, Serpentin and Lavimaudière, discharge of lac Barré, décharge du lac Marsanne.
  - right: (from the mouth) Discharge of lac des Vermisseaux.

The Rivière du Milieu is a tributary of Lac de la Belle Rivière, flowing the unorganized territory of Belle-Rivière, in the Lac-Saint-Jean-Est Regional County Municipality, in the administrative region of Saguenay-Lac-Saint-Jean, in the province of Quebec, in Canada. The course of this river is located in the northwestern part of the Laurentides Wildlife Reserve.

The middle river valley is located between route 155 (connecting La Tuque to Chambord) and route 169 (connecting Quebec (city) to Alma). This valley is served by some secondary forest roads, especially for forestry and recreational tourism activities.

Forestry is the main economic activity in this valley; recreational tourism, second.

The surface of the Middle River is usually frozen from the beginning of December to the end of March, however the safe circulation on the ice is generally made from mid-December to mid-March.

== Geography ==
The main watersheds neighboring the Rivière du Milieu are:

- north side: lac de la Belle Rivière, La Belle Rivière, Vert Lake, Bédard River (Saguenay River), Petite rivière Bédard, Rouge Creek, La Petite Décharge, Saguenay River;
- east side: Rivière aux Écorces, Pikauba River;
- south side: Grand lac des Cèdres, Métabetchouane River, outlet of Grand lac des Cèdres, Rivière aux Canots, Rivière aux Écorces;
- west side: Lac à la Carpe, Métabetchouane River, Bouchette lake, Ouiatchouan River, Lac Saint-Jean.

The Rivière du Milieu takes its source from non-Morelle lake (length: 0.6 km (0.37 mi); altitude: 444 m (1,457 ft)) in the forest zone in the Laurentides Wildlife Reserve. This source is located at:

- 3.4 km (2.1 mi) west of the Rivière aux Écorces;
- 13.9 km (8.6 mi) south-east of route 169;
- 27.5 km (17.1 mi) west of the center of the hamlet of Mont-Apica;
- 17.9 km (11.1 mi) south of the confluence of the Rivière du Milieu and Lac de la Belle Rivière;
- 22.1 km (13.7 mi) south-east of the mouth of Belle Rivière lake;
- 41.0 km (25.5 mi) south-east of lac Saint-Jean.

From its source, the "rivière du Milieu" flows over 23.2 km (14.4 mi) with a drop of 98 m (322 ft) entirely in the forest zone, according to the following segments:

- 11.2 km (7.0 mi) northwards passing east of lac Dabin and collecting the outlet (coming from the south) from lac Marsanne, up to the outlet of lac Barré (coming from the west);
- 2.9 km (1.8 mi) northward, curving northwest, to the outlet (coming from the north) of Lac des Vermisseaux;
- 4.0 km (2.5 mi) north-west, up to the outlet of some lakes including Serpentin Lake, Binet Lake, Anthemides Lake;
- 2.3 km (1.4 mi) north-west, up to the outlet (coming from the south-west) of lakes Loriset and Cognée;
- 2.8 km (1.7 mi) north to its mouth.

The Middle River pours into the bottom of a bay on the east shore of Lac Saint-Jean. This confluence is located at:

- 5.5 km (3.4 mi) south-east of the mouth of lac de la Belle Rivière;
- 15.6 km (9.7 mi) south of Vert Lake;
- 25.6 km (15.9 mi) south-east of the confluence of La Belle Rivière with a bay on the east shore of Lac Saint-Jean;
- 37.1 km (23.1 mi) south-east of the mouth of Lac Saint-Jean (via La Petite Décharge;
- 34.9 km (21.7 mi) south of downtown Alma;
- 53.4 km (33.2 mi) southwest of downtown Chicoutimi (sector of Saguenay (city)).

From the mouth of the Middle river on the shore on the lac de la Belle Rivière, the current crosses this lake on 5.4 km (3.4 mi) towards the west, then descends the course of the Belle Rivière north-west on 33.8 km (21.0 mi), then crosses the eastern part of Lac Saint-Jean north on 15.4 km (9.6 mi), follows the course of the Saguenay river via the Petite Discharge on 172.3 km (107.1 mi) until Tadoussac where it merges with the Saint Lawrence estuary.

== Toponymy ==
The toponym "Rivière du Milieu" was formalized on December 5, 1968, at the Place Names Bank of the Commission de toponymie du Québec.

== Appendices ==
=== Related articles ===
- Lac-Saint-Jean-Est Regional County Municipality
- Belle-Rivière, a TNO
- Laurentides Wildlife Reserve
- Lac de la Belle Rivière, a body of water
- La Belle Rivière, a stream
- Lac Saint-Jean, a body of water
- Saguenay River, a stream
- List of rivers of Quebec
