= Dorval River =

- Location within Quebec

Location
- Country: Canada
- Province: Quebec
- Region: Saguenay-Lac-Saint-Jean
- Regional County Municipality: Le Fjord-du-Saguenay Regional County Municipality
- City and municipality: Saguenay (city) and Larouche

Physical characteristics
- Source: Les Trois Lacs
  - location: Saguenay (city)
  - coordinates: 48.41749°N 71.38415°W
  - elevation: 185
- Mouth: Saguenay River
  - location: Larouche
  - coordinates: 48.52583°N 71.53555°W
  - elevation: 68 m (223 ft)
- Length: 10.6 km (6.6 mi)
- Discharge
  - location: Larouche

The "Dorval river" is a tributary of the Saguenay River, flowing in the city of Saguenay and in the municipality of Larouche, in the Le Fjord-du-Saguenay Regional County Municipality, in the administrative region of Saguenay–Lac-Saint-Jean, in the province of Quebec, in Canada. This river flows in the eastern part of the canton of La Barre.

The Dorval river valley is mainly served by the route 170 (boulevard du Royaume), for forestry and recreational tourism activities.

Forestry is the main economic activity in the Dorval River area; recreational tourism, second.

The surface of the Dorval River is usually frozen from the beginning of December to the end of March, however safe circulation on the ice is generally done from mid-December to mid-March.

== Geography ==
The main watersheds adjacent to the Dorval River are:

- north side: Saguenay River;
- east side: Saguenay River, rivière aux Sables, Chicoutimi River;
- south side: Bruyère River, Kenogami Lake (Cascouia bay), Cascouia River, Pont Flottant stream, Pikauba River, ruisseau L'Abbé;
- west side: Raquette River, Abattoir stream, Bédard River, Lac Saint-Jean.

The Dorval River rises at Les Trois Lacs (length: 0.8 km (0.50 mi); altitude: 185 m (607 ft)) surrounded by marshes. This source is located at:

- 1.5 km (0.93 mi) north of Lac Long;
- 1.7 km (1.1 mi) south of the Canadian National Railway and route 170;
- 7.4 km (4.6 mi) south of the Saguenay River;
- 10.8 km (6.7 mi) east of the village center of Larouche;
- 15.9 km (9.9 mi) south-east of the confluence of the Dorval river and the Saguenay River.

From its source (small unidentified lake), the Dorval river flows over 10.6 km (6.6 mi) with a drop of 117 m (384 ft) generally in forest area, sometimes agricultural, depending on the segments following:

- 2.6 km (1.6 mi) west by collecting the outlet (coming from the south) from Lake Wellie, then following the 1.0 km (0.62 mi) on the Canadian National railway, up to a river bend;
- 4.3 km (2.7 mi) towards the northwest by crossing the route 170 and bending towards the west, up to a bend in the river;
- 3.7 km (2.3 mi) towards the north-west, forming some small streamers, until the mouth of the river.

The course of the Dorval River flows to the bottom of a bay (stretching 0.7 km (0.43 mi) to the southeast) on the south shore of the Saguenay River. This confluence is located at:

- 1.3 km (0.81 mi) south of the north shore of the Saguenay River;
- 6.7 km (4.2 mi) north-west of a curve in route 170;
- 8.2 km (5.1 mi) north of the village center of Larouche;
- 12.7 km (7.9 mi) north-west of Cascouia Bay;
- 9.2 km (5.7 mi) east of downtown Alma;
- 17.4 km (10.8 mi) east of lac Saint-Jean.

From the mouth of the Dorval River, the current follows the course of the Saguenay River on 123 km (76 mi) east to Tadoussac where it merges with the Saint Lawrence estuary.

== Toponymy ==
The toponym “Dorval River” evokes the memory of Urbain Dorval, foreman at the first site on Gervais Creek around 1846. Urbain Dorval worked as site manager for Peter McLeod. His work site was apparently located "by the Dorval river /.../ a short distance from Alma's territory". This name is also present in Langelier, Jean-Chrysostome. The Lac Saint-Jean region, 1888, page 18 (extract from the report of the surveyor Du Tremblay, possibly dating from 1883). The name appears on the map of the canton of La Barre (1st impression of 1892, last impression of 1943).

The river Dorval toponym was formalized on December 5, 1968, at the Place Names Bank of the Commission de toponymie du Québec.

== Appendices ==
=== Related articles ===
- Le Fjord-du-Saguenay Regional County Municipality
- Larouche, a municipality
- Bruyère River
- Saguenay River
- List of rivers of Quebec
