= Rivière des Aulnaies (la Belle Rivière) =

- Location within Quebec

Location
- Country: Canada
- Province: Quebec
- Region: Saguenay-Lac-Saint-Jean
- Regional County Municipality: Lac-Saint-Jean-Est Regional County Municipality
- Municipalities: Hébertville

Physical characteristics
- Source: Kénogamichiche Lake
  - location: Hébertville
  - coordinates: 48.37818°N 71.65741°W
  - elevation: 142
- Mouth: la Belle Rivière
  - location: Hébertville
  - coordinates: 48.23028°N 71.72916°W
  - elevation: 130 m (430 ft)
- Length: 5.9 km (3.7 mi)
- Discharge
  - location: Hébertville

The rivière des Aulnaies is a tributary of La Belle Rivière, flowing the municipality of Hébertville, in the Lac-Saint-Jean-Est Regional County Municipality, in the administrative region of Saguenay–Lac-Saint-Jean, in the province of Quebec, in Canada.

The valley of the Aulnaies river is served by the route 169 (connecting Quebec (city) to Alma), by the chemin du 2e rang Est, rue La Barre and chemin du Rang Saint-Isidore, especially for forestry, agriculture and residents of the sector.

Agriculture is the main economic activity in this valley; village activities, second.

The surface of the Rivière des Aulnaies is usually frozen from the beginning of December to the end of March, however safe circulation on the ice is generally done from mid-December to mid-March.

== Geography ==
The main watersheds neighboring the Rivière des Aulnaies are:

- north side: la Belle Rivière, Boivin-Tremblay brook, Bédard River, Petite rivière Bédard, Rouge brook, la Petite Décharge, Saguenay River;
- east side: Kénogamichiche Lake, Pont Flottant stream, Kenogami Lake, Cascouia River, Pikauba River;
- south side: Vert Lake, la Belle Rivière, Lac de la Belle Rivière, Métabetchouane River, Rivière aux Canots, Rivière aux Écorces;
- west side: large Sec lake, la Belle Rivière, Métabetchouane River, Vouzier stream, Couchepaganiche River, Lac Saint-Jean.

The Aulnaies river originates at the mouth of Kénogamichiche Lake (length: 6.8 km (4.2 mi); altitude: 142 m (466 ft)) in agricultural areas in Hébertville. This source is located at:

- 0.26 km (0.16 mi) north of Vert Lake;
- 1.7 km (1.1 mi) north-east of route 169;
- 2.2 km (1.4 mi) south-east of the center of the village of Hébertville;
- 5.1 km (3.2 mi) south of the confluence of the Rivière des Aulnaies and la Belle Rivière;
- 3.9 km (2.4 mi) south of the course of the Petite rivière Bédard;
- 13.3 km (8.3 mi) south-east of the confluence of the la Belle Rivière and a bay in Lac Saint-Jean.

From its source, the Aulnaies river flows over 5.9 km (3.7 mi) with a drop of 19 m (62 ft), in agricultural and village areas, according to the following segments:

- 2.4 km (1.5 mi) north-west, up to the outlet (coming from the south-west) of Loriset and Cognée lakes;
- 3.3 km (2.1 mi) westwards through the village of Hébertville, bending north-west to its mouth.

The Aulnaies river flows on the east bank of la Belle Rivière. This confluence is located in Village-de-la-Chute, at:

- 2.8 km (1.7 mi) north-west of the center of the village of Hébertville;
- 6.0 km (3.7 mi) north-east of the hamlet of Lac Vouzier;
- 8.3 km (5.2 mi) south-east of the confluence of la Belle Rivière with a bay on the east shore of Lac Saint-Jean;
- 17.6 km (10.9 mi) south-east of the mouth of Lac Saint-Jean (via the Petite Décharge);
- 15.1 km (9.4 mi) south of downtown Alma;
- 47.1 km (29.3 mi) south-west of downtown Chicoutimi (sector of Saguenay (city)).

From the mouth of the Aulnaies river, the current descends the course of the Belle Rivière to the northwest on 6.1 km (3.8 mi), then crosses the eastern part of Lac Saint-Jean to the north on 15.4 km (9.6 mi), take the course of the Saguenay River via the la Petite Décharge on 172.3 km (107.1 mi) until Tadoussac where it merges with the Saint Lawrence estuary.

== Toponymy ==
The toponym “Rivière des Aulnaies” was formalized on December 5, 1968, at the Place Names Bank of the Commission de toponymie du Québec.

== Appendices ==
=== Related articles ===
- Lac-Saint-Jean-Est Regional County Municipality
- Hébertville, a Municipality
- Kénogamichiche Lake
- Vert Lake
- la Belle Rivière, a stream
- Lac Saint-Jean, a body of water
- Saguenay River, a stream
- List of rivers of Quebec
