= Camille Bedard =

Canadian professional hockey player (1933–2012)

- Born: December 1, 1933; St. Joseph d'Alma, Quebec, Canada
- Died: August 18, 2012 (aged 78)
- Height: 6 ft 0 in (183 cm)
- Weight: 185 lb (84 kg; 13 st 3 lb)
- Position: Defence
- Shot: Left
- Played for: Providence Reds; Quebec Aces; Trois-Rivieres Lions; Valleyfield Braves; San Francisco Seals; Los Angeles Blades
- Playing career: 1951–1966

Camille Bedard (December 1, 1933 – August 18, 2012) was a Canadian professional hockey defenceman who played 356 games in the American Hockey League for the Providence Reds and Quebec Aces. He also played for the Trois-Rivières Lions and Valleyfield Braves in the Quebec Hockey League, and in the Western Hockey League for the San Francisco Seals and Los Angeles Blades. Bedard died on August 18, 2012, at the age of 78.
