= Bédard River =

River in Saguenay–Lac-Saint-Jean, Quebec, Canada

- Location within Quebec

Location
- Country: Canada
- Province: Quebec
- Region: Saguenay-Lac-Saint-Jean
- Regional County Municipality: Lac-Saint-Jean-Est Regional County Municipality
- City: Larouche, Hébertville et Alma

Physical characteristics
- Source: Lac Déry
  - location: Larouche
  - coordinates: 48.41086°N 71.55883°W
  - elevation: 176
- Mouth: La Petite Décharge
  - location: Alma
  - coordinates: 48.55944°N 71.71722°W
  - elevation: 97 m (318 ft)
- Length: 30.9 km (19.2 mi)
- Discharge
  - location: Alma

Basin features
- Tributaries
  - left: Petite rivière Bédard
  - right: Rivière Raquette

The Bédard River is a tributary of the Saguenay River (via la Petite Décharge), flowing in the administrative region of Saguenay–Lac-Saint-Jean, in the province of Quebec, in Canada. The course of the river successively crosses the MRC of:

- Le Fjord-du-Saguenay Regional County Municipality: municipality of Larouche;
- Lac-Saint-Jean-Est Regional County Municipality: municipality of Hébertville, as well as the city of Alma.

The Bédard River valley is served by Scott Street West, route 169 (avenue du Pont Sud), by route 170, boulevard Maurice-Paradis, chemin du 6e rang, chemin du 5e rang, chemin du 4e rang nord, chemin du rang Saint-Pierre, chemin du Petit rang Saint-Pierre.

Agriculture is the main economic activity in the Bédard River area; forestry, second.

The surface of the Bédard River is usually frozen from the beginning of December to the end of March, however the safe circulation on the ice is generally made from mid-December to mid-March.

== Geography ==
The main watersheds adjacent to the Bédard River are:

- north side: la Petite Décharge, Saguenay River;
- east side: Rouge stream, Raquette River, Abattoir stream, Dorval River, Saguenay River, rivière aux Sables, Chicoutimi River;
- south side: Petite rivière Bédard, Grandmont brook, La Belle Rivière, rivière des Aulnaies, Vert Lake, Couchepaganiche East River;
- west side: Raquette River, Abattoir stream, Lac Saint-Jean.

The Bédard River rises at Lac Déry (length: 0.6 km (0.37 mi); altitude: 176 m (577 ft)) in the municipality of Larouche. This source is located at:

- 2.1 km (1.3 mi) west of Cascouia Bay (integrated into Kenogami Lake);
- 4.3 km (2.7 mi) south of the Canadian National railway;
- 5.1 km (3.2 mi) south of route 170;
- 37.1 km (23.1 mi) south-east of the Saguenay River;
- 4.7 km (2.9 mi) south of the village center of Larouche;
- 20.3 km (12.6 mi) south-east of the confluence of the Bédard and Saguenay rivers.

From its source (Lac Déry), the Bédard River flows over 30.9 km (19.2 mi) with a drop of 79 m (259 ft) generally in agricultural area, sometimes forest, according to the following segments:

- 8.0 km (5.0 mi) westwards, up to the Petite rivière Bédard (coming from the south-east);
- 1.8 km (1.1 mi) westward, to the Canadian National Railway located in the village of Hébertville;
- 2.6 km (1.6 mi) westwards passing south of the village of Hébertville, then northwards crossing the road from 3e rang, to route 169;
- 7.0 km (4.3 mi) towards the north by crossing the chemin du 4e rang Ouest and the chemin du 5e rang, and more or less along route 169, up to the confluence the Raquette River (coming from the east);
- 6.5 km (4.0 mi) towards the northwest by crossing the road from 6e rang Ouest, to the "Route du Lac Ouest";
- 5.0 km (3.1 mi) towards the northwest by forming a few small streamers and cutting Scott Street West at the end of the segment, to the mouth of the river.

The course of the Bédard River flows onto the south bank of the Saguenay River in la Petite Décharge segment. This confluence is located at:

- 3.1 km (1.9 mi) east of the confluence of Lac Saint-Jean and the Saguenay River (i.e. at the entrance to the la Petite Décharge);
- 5.6 km (3.5 mi) west of downtown Alma;
- 6.4 km (4.0 mi) south-west of the L'Isle-Maligne dam;
- 7.1 km (4.4 mi) south-east of the entrance to the Small Landfill.

From the mouth of the Bédard River, the current follows the course of the Saguenay River for 139 m (456 ft) east to Tadoussac where it merges with the Saint Lawrence estuary.

== Toponymy ==
"This river, sectioned in different places, has its source in the Kénogami horst and flows into the Little Landfill". The toponym “Bédard river” evokes “a certain Bédard” who “would have drowned there during a log drive”. The tragic event would have occurred before 1864, "because the river bears this name on a plan of the survey made that year. According to an eyewitness to the accident, this Bédard, having fallen into the water, had set foot on a rock in a fast and managed to stick to it for some time ”. We could not reach it, the waters being too high. "The accident took place at the confluence of two branches of the river, on lot 17 of range VI". The acronym also appears in Langelier, Jean-Chrysostome. The Lac Saint-Jean region, 1888, page 18. The name appears on the map of the township of La Barre (1st impression from 1892, last impression from 1943).

The toponym “Bédard River” was formalized on December 5, 1968, at the Place Names Bank of the Commission de toponymie du Québec.

== See also ==
- List of rivers of Quebec
