= La Belle Rivière =

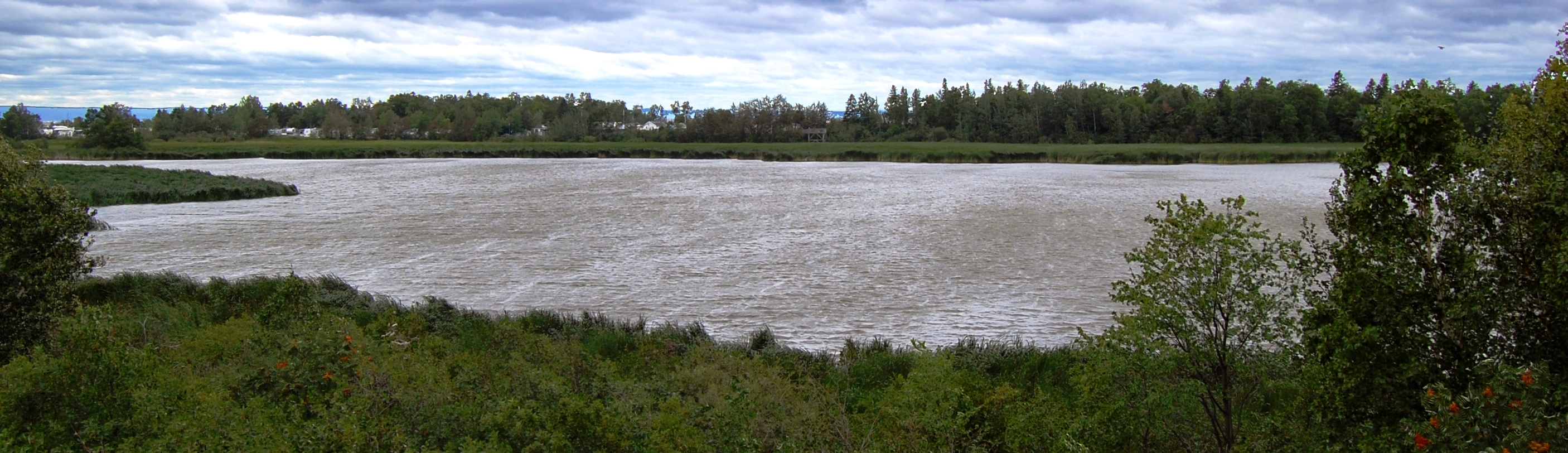

- Location within Quebec
- Native name: Rivière Couchepagane (French)

Location
- Country: Canada
- Province: Quebec
- Region: Saguenay-Lac-Saint-Jean
- Regional County Municipality: Lac-Saint-Jean-Est Regional County Municipality
- Municipalities: Belle-Rivière, Saint-Gédéon

Physical characteristics
- Source: Lac de la Belle Rivière
  - location: Belle-Rivière
  - coordinates: 48.23639°N 71.71972°E
  - elevation: 346
- Mouth: Lac Saint-Jean
  - location: Saint-Gédéon
  - coordinates: 48.46°N 71.78944°W
  - elevation: 101 m (331 ft)
- Length: 33.8 km (21.0 mi)
- Discharge
  - location: Saint-Gédéon

The Belle Rivière is a tributary of Lac Saint-Jean, flowing the unorganized territory of Belle-Rivière and in the municipalities of Hébertville and Saint-Gédéon, in the Lac-Saint-Jean-Est Regional County Municipality, in the administrative region of Saguenay–Lac-Saint-Jean, in Quebec, Canada.

The Belle Rivière valley is served by route 169, chemin du 3e rang, chemin du 2e rang, chemin du rang Caron, route des Savard, chemin du rang de la Belle-Rivière (north side of the river) and chemin du rang Sainte-Anne (south side). This valley is also served by some secondary forest roads, especially for forestry and recreational tourism activities.

Forestry and agriculture are the main economic activities in this valley; followed by recreational tourism, as a second economic activity.

The surface of the Belle Rivière is usually frozen from the beginning of December to the end of March, however the safe circulation on the ice is generally made from mid-December to mid-March.

== Geography ==
Taking its source from Lac de la Belle Rivière (48.23639°N 71.71972°W), this river is 33.8 km (21.0 mi) long. This river empties into Lac Saint-Jean at Saint-Gédéon.

The main watersheds neighboring the Belle Rivière are:

- north side: Bédard River, Petite rivière Bédard, Rouge stream, La Petite Décharge, Saguenay River;
- east side: Vert Lake, Kenogami Lake, Cascouia River, Pikauba River;
- south side: Métabetchouane River, rivière du Milieu, Grand lac des Cèdres outlet, rivière aux Canots, Chaine River;
- west side: Métabetchouane River, Couchepaganiche East River, Puant stream, Dumais stream, Lac Saint-Jean.

The La Belle Rivière rises at Lac de la Belle Rivière (length: 10.1 km (6.3 mi); altitude: 346 m (1,135 ft)) in the forest area. This source is located at:

- 6.6 km (4.1 mi) south-east of route 169;
- 16.6 km (10.3 mi) east of the village center of Saint-André-du-Lac-Saint-Jean;
- 19.5 km (12.1 mi) south-east of lac Saint-Jean;
- 21.3 km (13.2 mi) south-east of the confluence of the La Belle Rivière and a bay on the east shore of lac Saint-Jean;
- 32.0 km (19.9 mi) south of downtown Alma;
- 33.0 km (20.5 mi) south-east of the entrance to the La Petite Décharge.

From its source (lac de la Belle Rivière), the Belle Rivière flows over 33.8 km (21.0 mi) with a drop of 245 m (804 ft) entirely in the forest and agricultural zone, according to the following segments:

- 9.2 km (5.7 mi) north-east, up to a stream (coming from the south);
- 6.5 km (4.0 mi) northerly, curving northwest, to La Belle Rivière (coming from the southwest);
- 12 km (7.5 mi) towards the north by entering agricultural land and zigzagging at the end of the segment, until the confluence of the rivière des Aulnaies (coming from the south-east);
- 3.0 km (1.9 mi) north-west, up to a stream (coming from the east) which the area around the village Hébertville;
- 3.1 km (1.9 mi) west to its mouth.

La Belle Rivière pours into the bottom of a bay on the eastern shore of lac Saint-Jean. This confluence is located at:

- 2.5 km (1.6 mi) south of the entrance to the bay;
- 11.8 km (7.3 mi) south of the mouth of lac Saint-Jean (via La Petite Décharge);
- 13.9 km (8.6 mi) south-west of downtown Alma;
- 53.2 km (33.1 mi) south-west of downtown Chicoutimi (sector of Saguenay (city));
- 10.9 km (6.8 mi) west of the village center of Hébertville.

From the mouth of La Belle Rivière on the east shore of lac Saint-Jean, the current goes north on 15.4 km (9.6 mi) crossing this last lake, follows the course of the Saguenay River via La Petite Décharge on 172.3 km (107.1 mi) until Tadoussac where it merges with the Saint Lawrence estuary.

== Toponymy ==
Its name comes from the montagnais "Mirochip8" which means "beautiful river".

It has also previously been known as the Couchepagane River Kushpahigan or .

The toponym "La Belle Rivière" was formalized on December 5, 1968, at the Place Names Bank of the Commission de toponymie du Québec.

== See also ==
- Lac-Saint-Jean-Est Regional County Municipality
- Belle-Rivière, a TNO
- Hébertville, a municipality
- Saint-Gédéon, a municipality
- Lac de la Belle Rivière, a body of water
- Rivière des Aulnaies, a watercourse
- Lac Saint-Jean, a body of water
- Saguenay River, a stream
- List of rivers of Quebec
