= Quebec Autoroute 70 =

Highway in Quebec

Autoroute 70
- Autoroute du Saguenay; Autoroute Alma-La Baie (future)
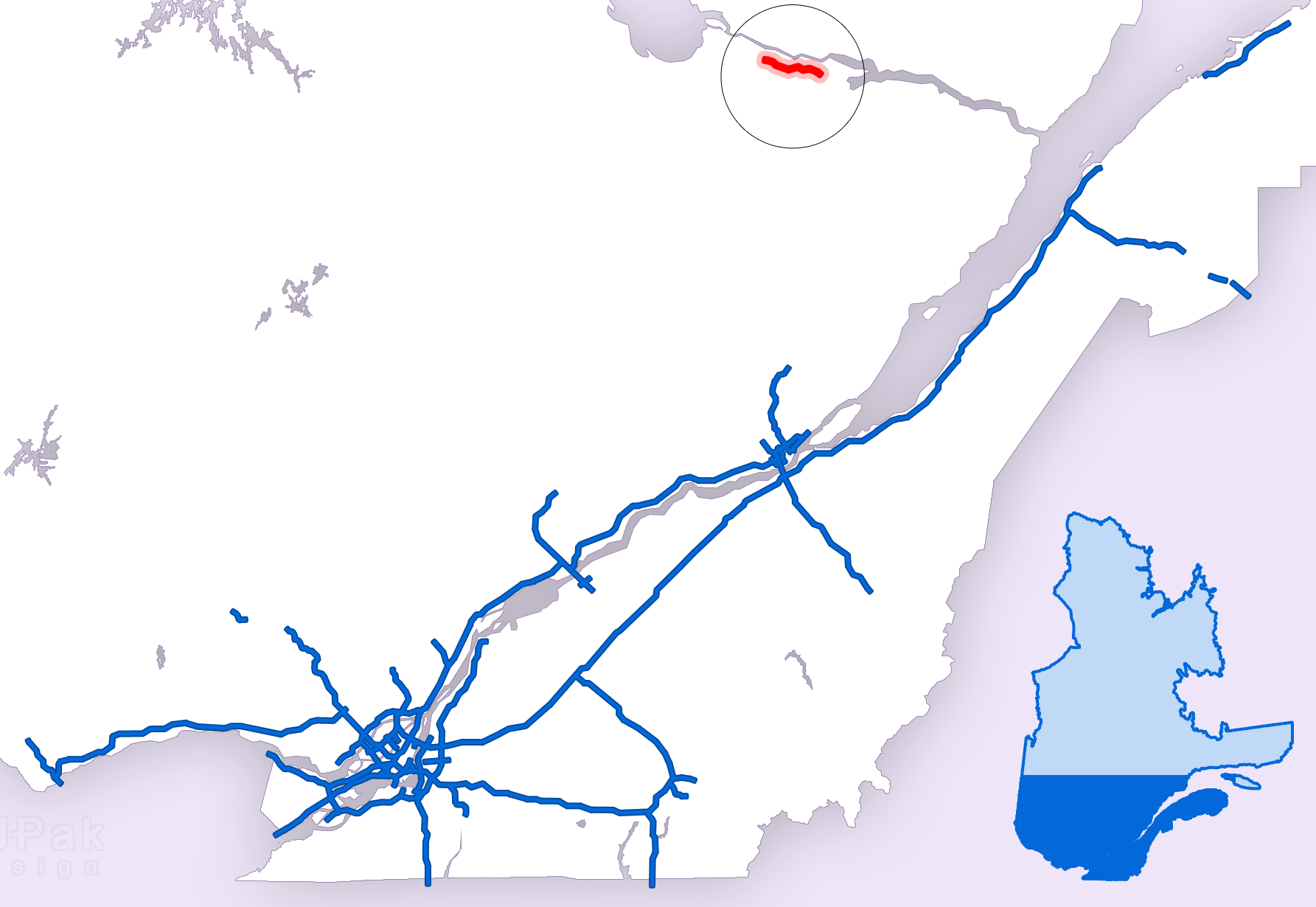

Route information
- Maintained by Transports Québec
- Length: 31.56 km (19.61 mi)
- Existed: 1983–present

Major junctions
- West end: R-170 in Saguenay
- R-372 in Saguenay; R-175 in Saguenay
- East end: R-170 in Saguenay

Location
- Country: Canada
- Province: Quebec
- Major cities: Alma (future), Saguenay

Highway system
- Quebec provincial highways; Autoroutes; List; Former
← A-55	→ A-73

Autoroute 70, or A-70, is a short Autoroute located in the Saguenay-Lac-Saint-Jean region of northern Quebec. It is the only Autoroute that does not connect to any other Autoroutes, although other Autoroutes have discontiguous segments (such as A-20 and A-30). A-70 was first created in 1983, and has since been extended three times.

A-70 is 31.56 km (19.6 mi) long at present, however extensions are being proposed in both directions. A-70 is only partially completed; it acts primarily as a bypass route around the urban area of Saguenay. The route was slow to develop; until 2001 it was an extremely short stub, fewer than 6 km (3.7 mi) long.

A-70 will be extended westward to Alma and eastward to La Baie. A new alignment has already been determined for the westernmost section of A-70. The proposed route for the eastern section has also been determined and 7.29 km (4.5 mi) of it has been built – from the former eastern terminus of the original A-70 to the Saguenay-Bagotville Airport.

The ultimate length of A-70 will be around 72 km (44.7 mi).

== History ==
The A-70 was designed to provide a limited-access highway link between Alma and La Baie. The autoroute has been built in increments since the early 1980s. It took nearly ten years for the first eight kilometers to be built. During the 1990s, highway planners modified the plans. Rather than building the western section of A-70 to parallel Route 170 between 8e Rang in Hébertville (km 5) and St-Benedict Road (km 25), instead Route 170 was rebuilt as a four-lane divided highway. This interim rebuild was completed by 1999. Three years later, an additional 17 kilometres of new freeway in the central section were opened, connecting this rebuilt section of Route 170 with the original portion of A-70.

== Future ==
To date, approximately 40 kilometres (25 mi) of highway remain to be completed of the ultimate freeway link between Alma and La Baie. Transports Québec has conducted a feasibility study for the western section while continuing to acquire property to provide a right of way.

== Exit list ==
The entire route is located in Saguenay, Quebec, Saguenay–Lac-Saint-Jean.

km	mi	Exit	Destinations	Notes
0.00	0.00	26	R-170 (Boulevard du Royaume) / Chemin St-Benoit	Road continues west as R-170 (at-grade expressway)
8.62	5.36	33	Rue St-Hubert – Jonquiere Centre-Ville, Lac-Kenogami	
11.73	7.29	36	R-372 (Boulevard René-Lévesque)	Also serves Rue Panet
14.71	9.14	39	Rue Mathias / Boulevard Mellon	
17.49	10.87	42	R-170 (Boulevard du Royaume)	Signed as exits 42O (west) and 42E (east) westbound; original western terminus
20.00	12.43	45	Boulevard Saint-Paul	
22.39	13.91	47	R-175 (Boulevard Talbot) – Chicoutimi, Québec	
24.76	15.39	50	R-170 (Boulevard du Royaume) – Laterriére	Former eastern terminus of original section at temporary at-grade intersection, since replaced with an interchange to the southeast
31.56	19.61	–	R-170 (Chemin Saint-Anicet) – Aéroport Bagotville	Eastern terminus; roundabout intersection
1.000 mi = 1.609 km; 1.000 km = 0.621 mi
