= Cascouia River =

River in Quebec, Canada

- Location within Quebec

Location
- Country: Canada
- Province: Quebec
- Region: Saguenay-Lac-Saint-Jean
- Regional County Municipality: Le Fjord-du-Saguenay Regional County Municipality
- Unorganized territory: Larouche and Saguenay (ville)

Physical characteristics
- Source: Little unidentified lake
  - location: Larouche
  - coordinates: 48.42950°N 71.55284°W
  - elevation: 207 m (679 ft)
- Mouth: Kenogami Lake
  - location: Saguenay (ville)
  - coordinates: 48.42950°N 71.445°W
  - elevation: 150 m (490 ft)
- Length: 12.0 km (7.5 mi)
- Discharge
  - location: Saguenay (ville)

Basin features
- Tributaries
  - left: (from the mouth) Décharge du lac Henri, décharge du lac Lésigny, décharge des lacs Long et Leclerc.
  - right: (from the mouth) Ruisseau du Pont Flottant, décharge du lac Déchène.

The Cascouia River is a tributary of Kenogami Lake, flowing in the municipality of Larouche in the Le Fjord-du-Saguenay Regional County Municipality and in the city of Saguenay, in the administrative region of Saguenay–Lac-Saint-Jean, in the province of Quebec, in Canada.

The Cascouia river valley is served by the route 169 and the “route des Bâtisseurs” which bypasses the northern part of the lake. This valley is also served by a few secondary forest roads, especially for forestry and recreational tourism activities.

Recreational and tourist activities are the main economic activity around Cascouia Bay, especially vacationing around Lac du Camp; hydroelectric activities, second; forestry, third.

The surface of the Cascouia River is usually frozen from the beginning of December to the end of March, however the safe circulation on the ice is generally made from mid-December to mid-March.

== Geography ==
Following successive increases in the water level of Kenogami Lake in the early 20th century, Cascouia Bay expanded at the expense of the former Cascouia River, becoming a lake pass. The Cascouia River is located in the former municipality of lac-Kénogami.

The main watersheds neighboring the Cascouia River are:

- north side: Chamois lake, Potvin lake, Bruyère River, Dorval River, Dupéré brook, Saguenay River;
- east side: Kenogami Lake, rivière aux Sables, Chicoutimi River;
- south side: Kenogami Lake, Pikauba River, ruisseau L'Abbé;
- west side: Vert Lake, Rivière des Aulnaies, Pont Flottant stream, La Belle Rivière.

The Cascouia river originates from a small unidentified lake (length: 0.7 kilometres (0.43 mi); altitude: 207 metres (679 ft)) in the shape of a V. This source is located at:

- 2.9 kilometres (1.8 mi) south-west of the village center of Larouche where the Canadian National railway passes;
- 3.1 kilometres (1.9 mi) north-west of Cascouia Bay from Kenogami Lake;
- 10.3 kilometres (6.4 mi) south of the Saguenay River;
- 14.3 kilometres (8.9 mi) south-east of downtown Alma;
- 14.3 kilometres (8.9 mi) north-west of the confluence of the Pikauba River and Kenogami Lake;
- 28.6 kilometres (17.8 mi) east of the barrage de Portage-des-Roches;
- 35.4 kilometres (22.0 mi) south-west of the confluence of the Chicoutimi River and the Saguenay River.

From its source (small unidentified lake), the Cascouia river flowed on 12.0 kilometres (7.5 mi) with a drop of 57 metres (187 ft) entirely in the forest zone, according to the following segments:

- 4.0 kilometres (2.5 mi) towards the south-east by crossing the current Camp lake on 1.3 kilometres (0.81 mi), until its mouth;
- 3.5 kilometres (2.2 mi) towards the south-east crossing the current Cascouia bay, up to the Cascouia pass;
- 4.6 kilometres (2.9 mi) south-east across the Cascouia pass, to the natural mouth of the river.

The old course of the Cascouia River emptied into Epiphanes Bay on the north shore of Kenogami Lake; following the erection of dams on Kenogami River, the old course is largely under the waters of this dam lake. This former confluence was located at:

- 1.3 kilometres (0.81 mi) east of the rue des Bâtisseurs bridge (spanning the Cascouia river);
- 9.4 kilometres (5.8 mi) south of autoroute 70;
- 12.5 kilometres (7.8 mi) southwest of Lac Barrage Pibrac-Ouest, located at the head of the rivière aux Sables;
- 15.9 kilometres (9.9 mi) south-west of Jonquière town center;
- 18.0 kilometres (11.2 mi) west of the barrage de Portage-des-Roches;
- 28.9 kilometres (18.0 mi) south-west of the confluence of the Chicoutimi River and the Saguenay River.

From the mouth of the Cascouia river, the current crosses the Kenogami Lake for 19.1 kilometres (11.9 mi) east to the barrage de Portage-des-Roches, then follows the course of the Chicoutimi river on 26.2 kilometres (16.3 mi) towards the east, then the northeast and the course of the Saguenay river on 114.6 kilometres (71.2 mi) towards the east up to Tadoussac where it merges with the Saint Lawrence estuary.

== Toponymy ==
Cascouia Bay is frequently called “Lac Cascouia”, due to its isolation from the central part of Kenogami Lake.

One of the first known mentions of the Innu word "Cascaouia" is attributed to the surveyor Joseph-Laurent Normandin, in 1732, who wrote in his Journal: "... There is a large bay, which is bordered by jongs and grasses, that the Indians call Les Gachek8illaces de Quinongamingue ”. Normandin also uses the form "Baye des Gachek8illasses". By modifying its primitive form in order to facilitate its use, the first explorers perpetuated this Amerindian term meaning "grasslands" or "rushes". For some, it is actually cattails. Several orthographic variants exist for this appellation, in particular: Kascouia, Kaskauia, Kaskovia, Kaskouia and Kashkouia. Other Amerindian spelling noted: Kashkouillasses.

The toponym “rivière Cascouia” was formalized on December 5, 1968, at the Place Names Bank of the Commission de toponymie du Québec.

== See also ==
- List of rivers of Quebec
