= Quebec Route 372 =

Highway in Quebec, Canada

Route 372

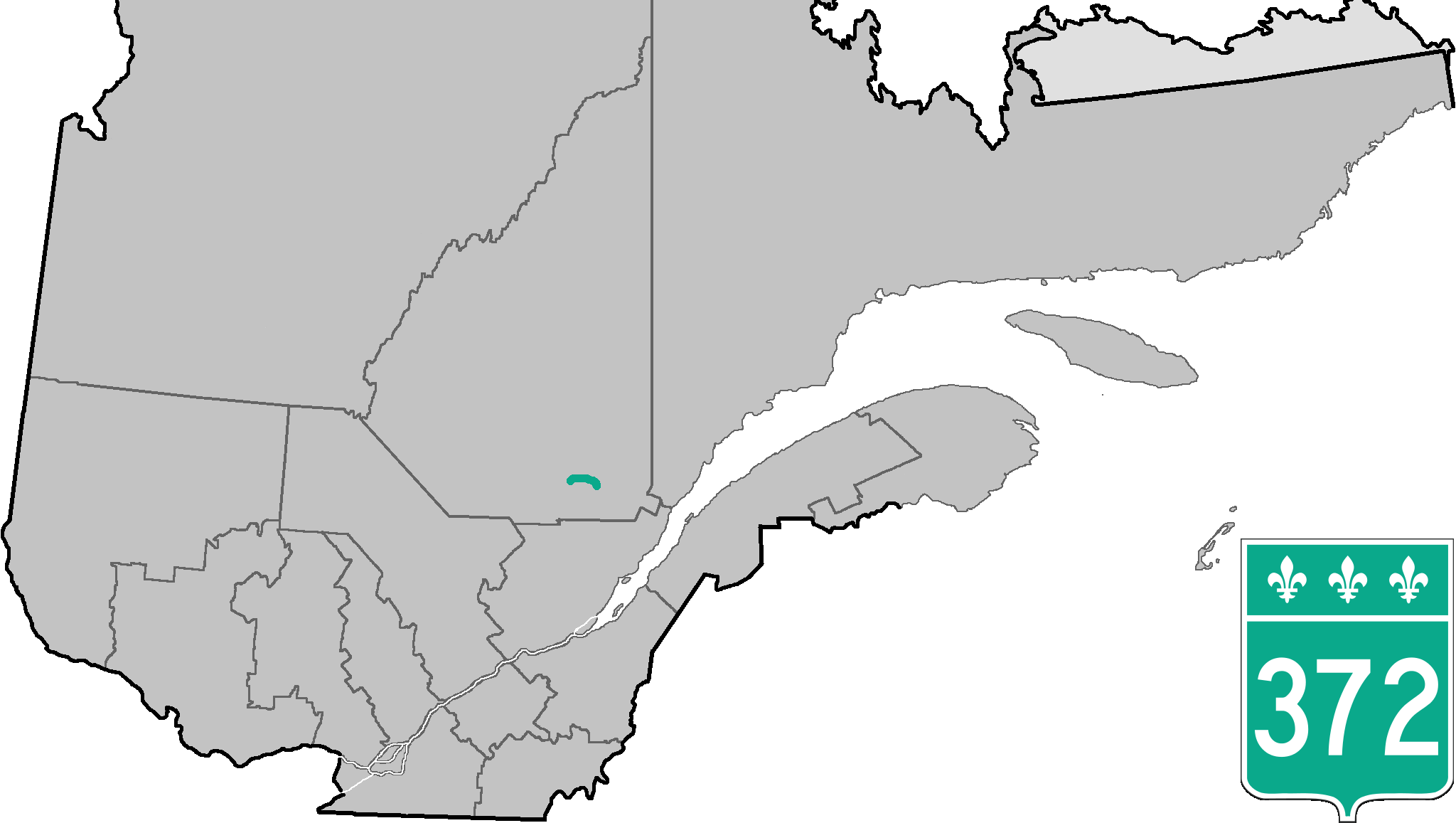

Route information
- Maintained by Transports Québec
- Length: 32.9 km (20.4 mi)

Major junctions
- West end: A-70 in Saguenay (Jonquiere)
- R-175 in Saguenay (Chicoutimi); R-170 in Saguenay (Jonquiere)
- East end: R-170 in Saguenay (La Baie)

Location
- Country: Canada
- Province: Quebec
- Major cities: Saguenay

Highway system
- Quebec provincial highways; Autoroutes; List; Former
← R-371	→ R-373

Route 372 is a provincial highway located in the Saguenay–Lac-Saint-Jean region in central Quebec. The highway runs exclusively inside the city of Saguenay and runs from Jonquière (at Autoroute 70) to La Baie (Route 170). A large portion of its length is parallel to the Saguenay River.

== Towns along Route 372 ==
- Saguenay - including Jonquière, Chicoutimi and La Baie

== See also ==
- List of Quebec provincial highways
