= Rivière aux Rats =

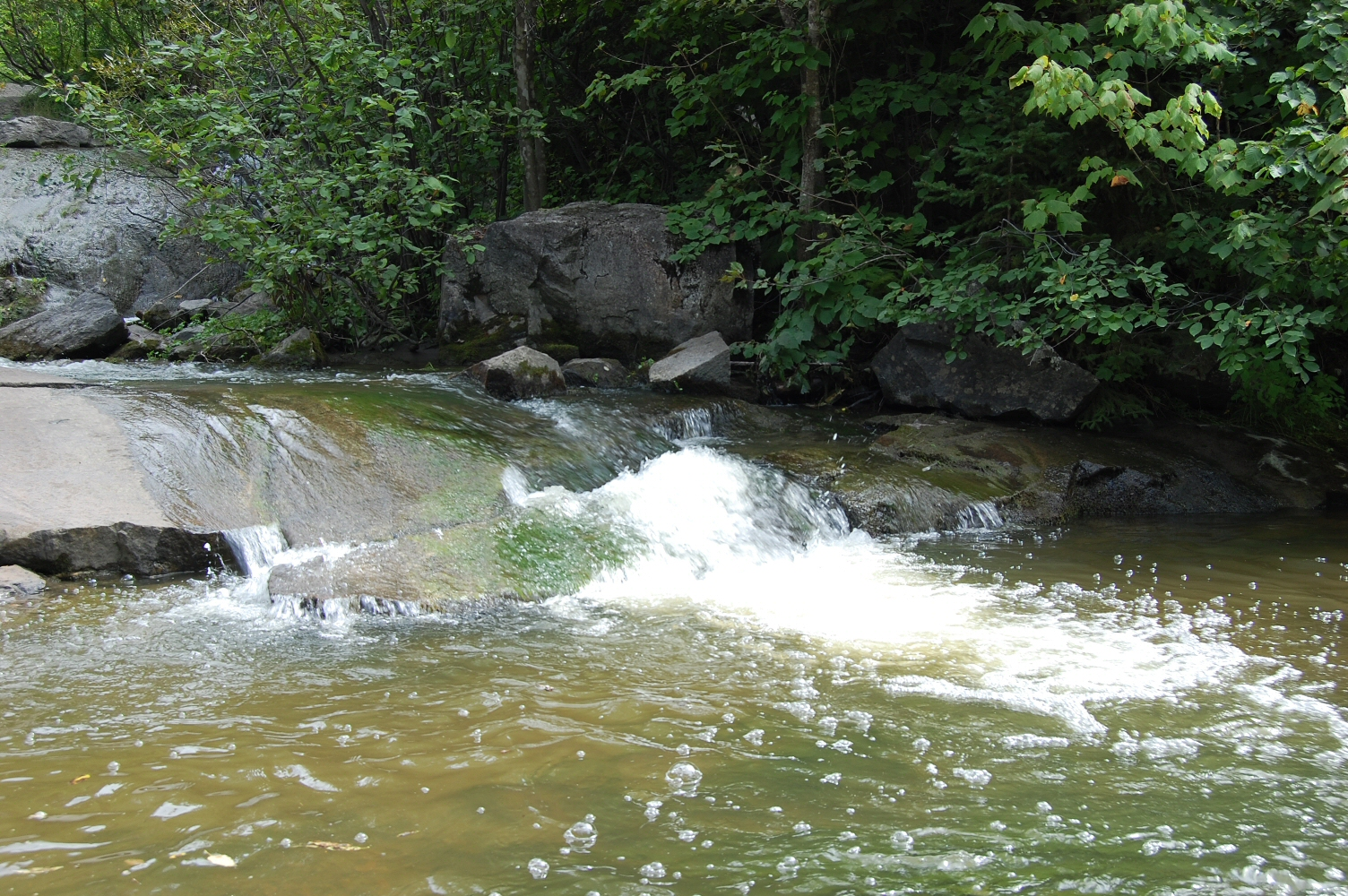
- The "rivière aux Rats" view from Rosaire-Gauthier park.

- Location within Quebec

Location
- Country: Canada
- Province: Quebec
- Region: Saguenay-Lac-Saint-Jean
- Regional County Municipality: Le Fjord-du-Saguenay Regional County Municipality
- City: Saguenay

Physical characteristics
- Source
  - location: Saguenay
- Mouth: Saguenay River
  - location: Saguenay
  - coordinates: 48.42333°N 71.06528°W
  - elevation: 4 m (13 ft)
- Length: 3.72 km (2.31 mi)
- Discharge
  - location: Saguenay

The rivière aux Rats (from muskrat) is a watercourse crossing the borough Chicoutimi sector, at Saguenay (city) (Quebec, Canada). At 3.72 km (2.31 mi) in length, it is a minor tributary of the Saguenay River.

The surface of the Rivière aux Rats is usually frozen from the beginning of December to the end of March, however, the safe circulation on the ice is generally done from mid-December to mid-March.

== Description ==
The Rats river flows more or less in parallel between the Chicoutimi River (west side) and the rivière du Moulin (east side).

The Rivière aux Rats begins, in the south, near boulevard du Royaume (route 170), passes near Rosaire-Gauthier Park, under Jean-Béliveau Park and empties into Saguenay River at the height of the rue de l'Hotel-de-Ville.

This watercourse was, in part, channeled in 1929 under the Chicoutimi Downtown.

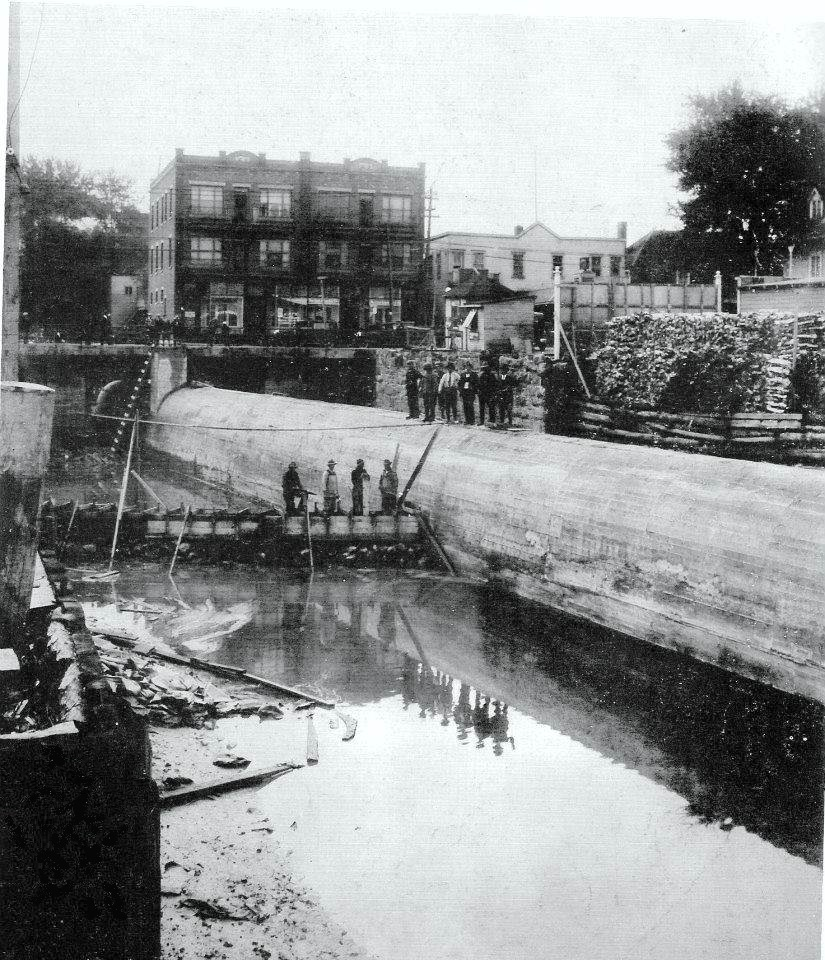
Chicoutimi, September 14, 1929, Racine and Hôtel-de-Ville streets, canalization of the Rats River

In its southern part, a woodland protects its natural state. A 2.4 km (1.5 mi) trail, accessible all year round, has been built along the Rats River: the Muscat Rats Trail.

== Toponymy ==
The toponym “Rivière aux Rats” was formalized on February 25, 1976, at the Place Names Bank of the Commission de toponymie du Québec.

== Appendices ==
=== Related articles ===
- Chicoutimi
- Saguenay (city)
- Saguenay River
- List of rivers of Quebec
