= Lac de la Belle Rivière =

- Location in Quebec
- Location: Belle-Rivière
- Coordinates: 48.23639°N 71.71972°W
- Lake type: Natural
- Primary inflows: (clockwise from the mouth) Discharge of lac des Scarabées, discharge of lac Bélair, discharge of lac des Vases, rivière du Milieu, discharge of Grand lac des Cèdres and an unidentified stream.
- Primary outflows: La Belle Rivière
- Basin countries: Canada
- Max. length: 10.1 km (6.3 mi)
- Max. width: 1.4 km (0.87 mi)
- Surface elevation: 142 m (466 ft)

The lac de la Belle Rivière is a freshwater body at the head of Belle Rivière on the watershed of lac Saint-Jean, in the unorganized territory of Belle-Rivière, in the Lac-Saint-Jean-Est Regional County Municipality, in the region Saguenay–Lac-Saint-Jean, in the province of Quebec, in Canada.

Lake Belle Rivière is located in the northwestern part of the Laurentides Wildlife Reserve.

This small valley is served by the route 169 and by the route des Laurentides which runs along the lake on the northeast side. A few secondary roads serve this area for the needs of forestry, recreational tourism activities.

Forestry is the main economic activity in the sector; recreational tourism, second.

The surface of Belle Rivière Lake is usually frozen from the beginning of December to the end of March, however the safe circulation on the ice is generally from mid-December to mid-March.

== Geography ==
The main watersheds adjacent to Lake Belle Rivière are:

- north side: Bélair lake, Beauséjour lake, Curés lake, Belle Rivière, Vert Lake;
- east side: Thom stream, Sauce stream, Pikauba River, Bras des Angers, rivière aux Écorces;
- south side: Carpe lake, Paul stream, rivière du Milieu, Grand lac des Cèdres, Thom stream, Métabetchouane River.
- west side: Métabetchouane River, Belle Rivière stream, Grignon River, Ouiatchouan River, Lac Saint-Jean.

The Belle Rivière lake has a length of 10.1 km (6.3 mi), a width of 1.4 km (0.87 mi) and an altitude of 346 m (1,135 ft). This lake has three parts formed by two narrows.

This lake is mainly fed by the rivière du Milieu (coming from the south) and by the outlet (coming from the south) of the big lake of Cedars. The mouth of this lake is located to the west, at the Laurentian Highway bridge, at:

- 6.6 km (4.1 mi) south-east of route 169;
- 16.6 km (10.3 mi) east of the village center of Saint-André-du-Lac-Saint-Jean;
- 19.5 km (12.1 mi) south-east of lac Saint-Jean;
- 21.3 km (13.2 mi) south-east of the confluence of the Belle Rivière and a bay on the east shore of Lac Saint-Jean;
- 32.0 km (19.9 mi) south of downtown Alma;
- 33.0 km (20.5 mi) south-east of the entrance to the La Petite Décharge.

From the mouth of Belle Rivière lake, the current follows the course of the Belle Rivière consecutively on 33.8 km (21.0 mi) northwesterly to the east shore of Lac Saint-Jean; from there, the current goes north on 15.4 km (9.6 mi) crossing this last lake, follows the course of the Saguenay river via the Petite Décharge on 172.3 km (107.1 mi) until Tadoussac where it merges with the Saint Lawrence estuary.

== Toponymy ==
The name "Belle Rivière" is linked to the river, a stream and the municipality of the same name in the same sector.

The toponym Lac de la Belle Rivière was formalized on December 5, 1968, by the Commission de toponymie du Québec.

== Appendices ==
=== Related articles ===
- Lac-Saint-Jean-Est Regional County Municipality
- Belle-Rivière, a TNO
- Saguenay River
- Lac Saint-Jean
- La Belle Rivière
- Rivière du Milieu Middle River
- List of lakes in Canada
