= Rivière aux Sables (Saguenay River tributary) =

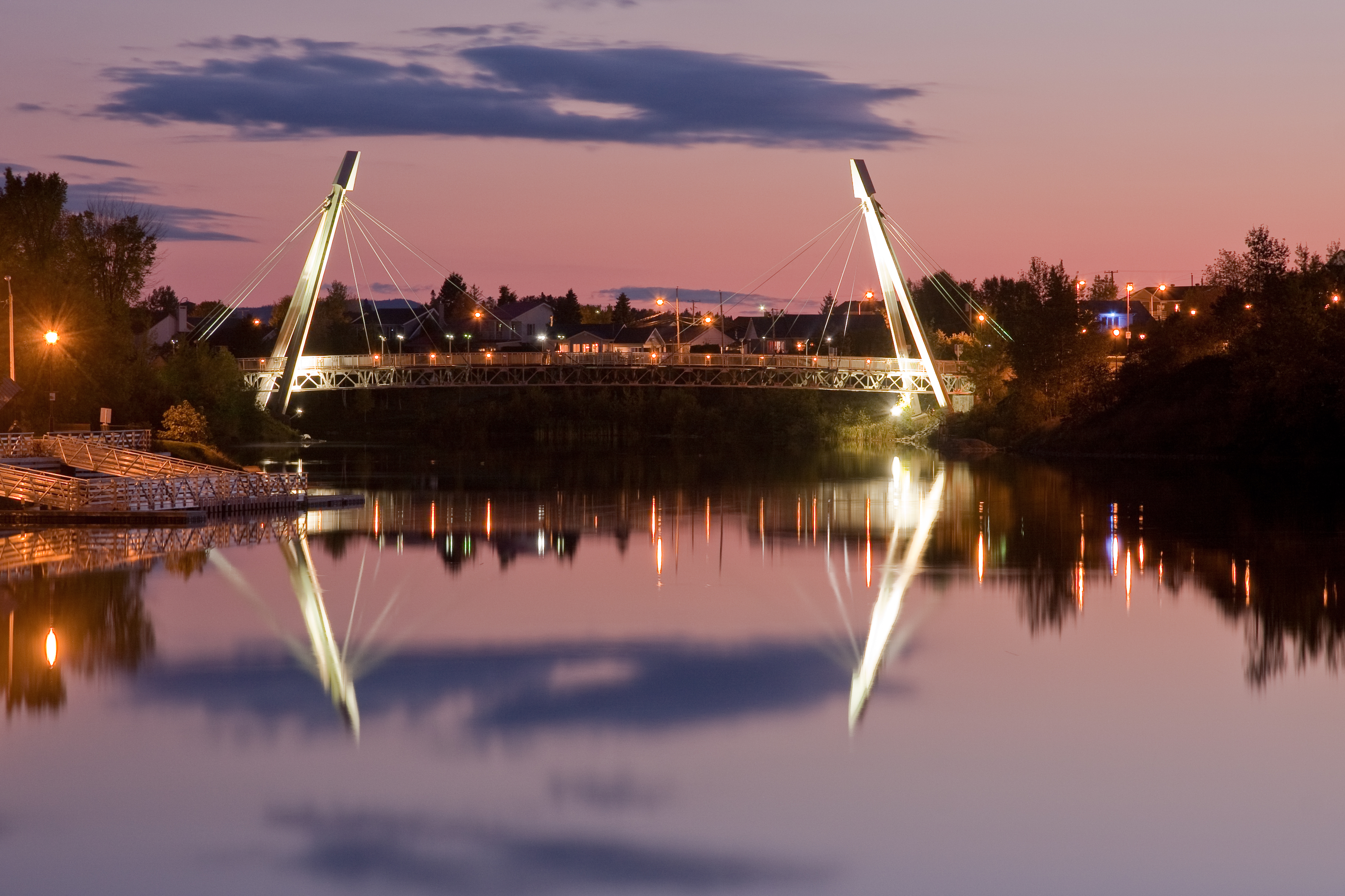
- Aluminum walkway spanning the "rivière aux Sables" in Saguenay (city)

- Location within Quebec

Location
- Country: Canada
- Province: Quebec
- Region: Saguenay-Lac-Saint-Jean
- Regional County Municipality: Le Fjord-du-Saguenay Regional County Municipality
- City: Saguenay

Physical characteristics
- Source: Kenogami Lake
  - location: Saguenay
  - coordinates: 48.32667°N 71.37666°W
  - elevation: 164
- Mouth: Kenogami Lake
  - location: Saguenay
  - coordinates: 48.44278°N 71.24694°W
  - elevation: 67 m (220 ft)
- Length: 11 km (6.8 mi)
- Discharge
  - location: Saguenay

Basin features
- Tributaries
  - left: (from the mouth) Ruisseau des Chasseurs, ruisseau Desgagné.
  - right: (from the mouth) Ruisseau Ratté, ruisseau Dallaire.

The rivière aux Sables is a river of the city of Saguenay (city), in the administrative region of Saguenay-Lac-Saint-Jean, in Quebec, in Canada. This watercourse constitutes one of the two outlets of Kenogami Lake; it flows north to flow into the Saguenay River. It is the only river that crosses Jonquière.

The Saint-Jean-Baptiste street serves the West Bank; Saint-Dominique street serves the east bank. The "Boulevard du Royaume" and Price street serve the lower part. The autoroute 70 cuts the middle of the watercourse.

The surface of the "rivière aux Sables" is usually frozen from the end of November to the beginning of April, however the safe circulation on the ice is generally done from mid-December to the end of March.

== Geography ==
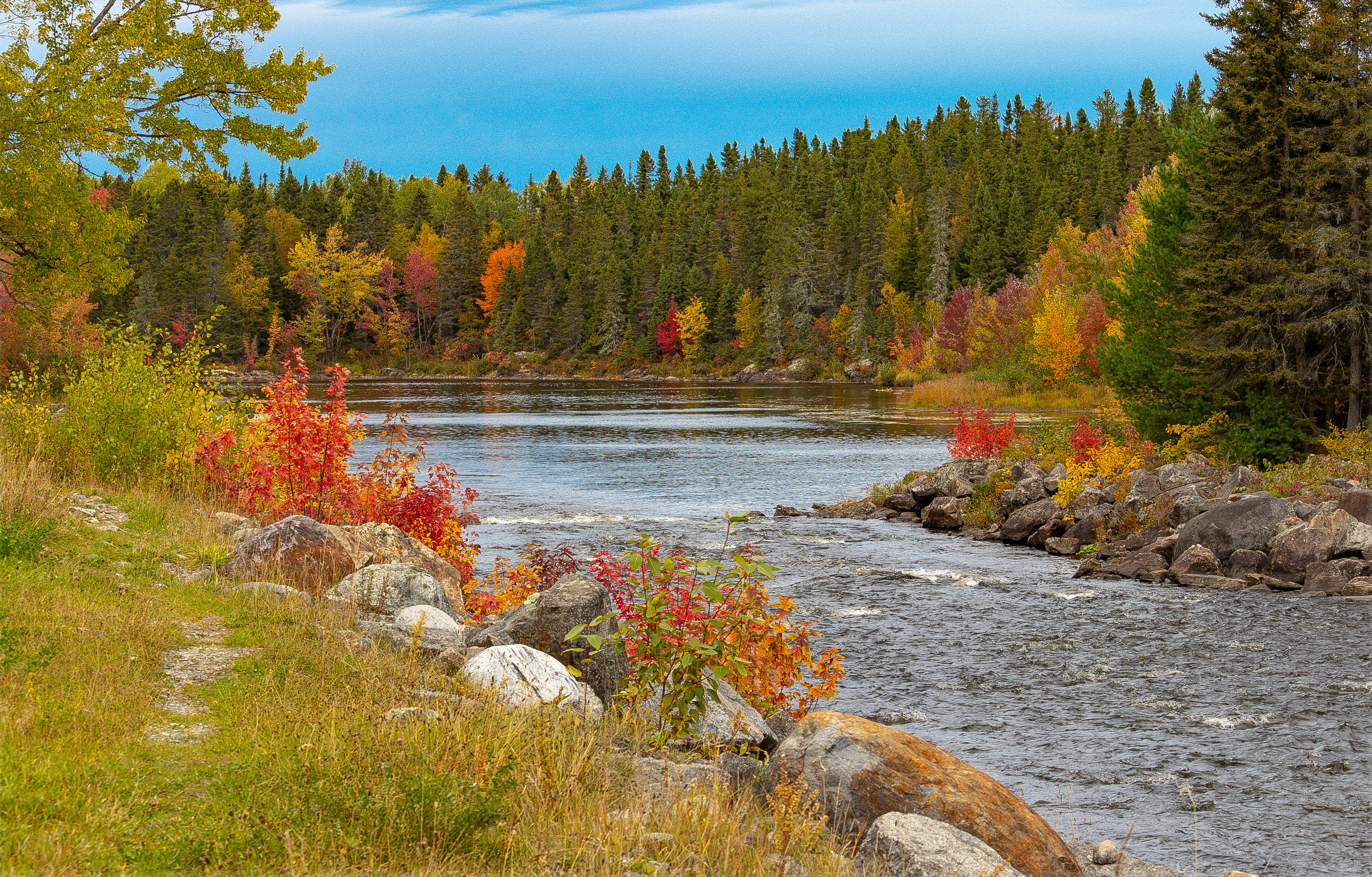
Very close to the Captain's Marina at Lake Kénogani Qc

The main watersheds neighboring the Rivière aux Sables are:

- north side: Saguenay River, Shipshaw River;
- east side: Chicoutimi River, Lapointe brook, Grande Ligne brook, rivière aux Rats;
- south side: Kenogami Lake, Cyriac River;
- west side: Desgagné stream, Chasseurs stream, rivière du Lac Onésime, Dorval River, Lac Saint-Jean.

The Sables River rises at the Pibrac-Ouest dam of Kenogami Lake (length: 26.9 km (16.7 mi); altitude: 164 m (538 ft)). This source is located at:

- 7.3 km (4.5 mi) north-west of the barrage de Portage-des-Roches, located at the head of the Chicoutimi River;
- 6.5 km (4.0 mi) north of the confluence of the Cyriac River and Kenogami Lake;
- 8.6 km (5.3 mi) south of downtown Kénogami;
- 9.5 km (5.9 mi) south of the confluence of the "rivière aux Sables" and the Saguenay River.

From its source (Pibrac-Ouest dam), the "rivière aux Sables" flows over 10.1 km (6.3 mi) with a drop of 159 m (522 ft) generally in urban areas, according to the following segments:

- 1.7 km (1.1 mi) north-west, up to the bridge on rue Saint-Dominique;
- 2.3 km (1.4 mi) to the north, forming large zigzags and collecting Desgagné stream (coming from the west) to the aluminum highway bridge (autoroute 70);
- 3.7 km (2.3 mi) towards the north by collecting the Chasseurs stream (coming from the west), passing under the railway bridge, crossing a dam, up to the bridge of the Boulevard du Royaume (route 170);
- 2.4 km (1.5 mi) towards the north by crossing a dam and passing under the bridge on rue de Chute-à-Caron at the end of the segment, to its mouth.

The Rivière aux Sables flows onto the south bank of the Saguenay River. This confluence is located at:

- 1.0 km (0.62 mi) south-east of the Chute-à-Caron dam on the Saguenay River;
- 1.6 km (0.99 mi) northwest of downtown Kénogami (sector);
- 3.1 km (1.9 mi) south-east of the confluence of the Shipshaw River with the Saguenay River;
- 13.3 km (8.3 mi) southwest of downtown Chicoutimi (sector of Saguenay (city);
- 28.9 km (18.0 mi) west of the Baie des Ha! Ha!.

From the mouth of the "rivière aux Sables", the current successively follows the course of the Saguenay River on 142.7 km (88.7 mi) east to Tadoussac where it merges with the Saint Lawrence estuary. The mouth of "rivière aux Sables" is at 14.5 km (9.0 mi) upstream from the mouth of Chicoutimi River.

== Bridges crossing it (from south to north) ==
Many bridges cross this river.

- The Pibrac bridge on St-Dominique street towards Lac-Kénogami
- CEPAL walkways (pedestrians)
- The autoroute 70 bridge
- The aluminum walkway (pedestrians)
- The old bridge near the Rivière-aux-Sables park.
- The railway bridge
- Harvey Boulevard Bridge
- Nelson Bridge (route 170)
- The old Price Bridge
- The rue Chute bridge in Caron

== Tourist attractions ==
At the level of Jonquière, the "rivière aux Sables" is peaceful which allows citizens to do many activities. In summer, you can go fishing and navigate by pedal boat or canoe.

During Father's Day, the Jonquière hospital organizes a "duck race" to collect donations. The event takes place on the river, where thousands of small yellow ducklings are released. These are swept away by the current and the first to reach the finish line designates the winner of the race. The event is now taking place at the end of the summer.

== Toponymy ==
The toponym "Rivière aux Sables" was formalized on December 5, 1968} at the Place Names Bank of the Commission de toponymie du Québec.

== Appendices ==
=== Related articles ===
- Kenogami Lake, a body of water
- Saguenay River
- Kénogami (city)
- Saguenay (city)
- List of rivers of Quebec
