= Larouche, Quebec =

Larouche
- Municipality
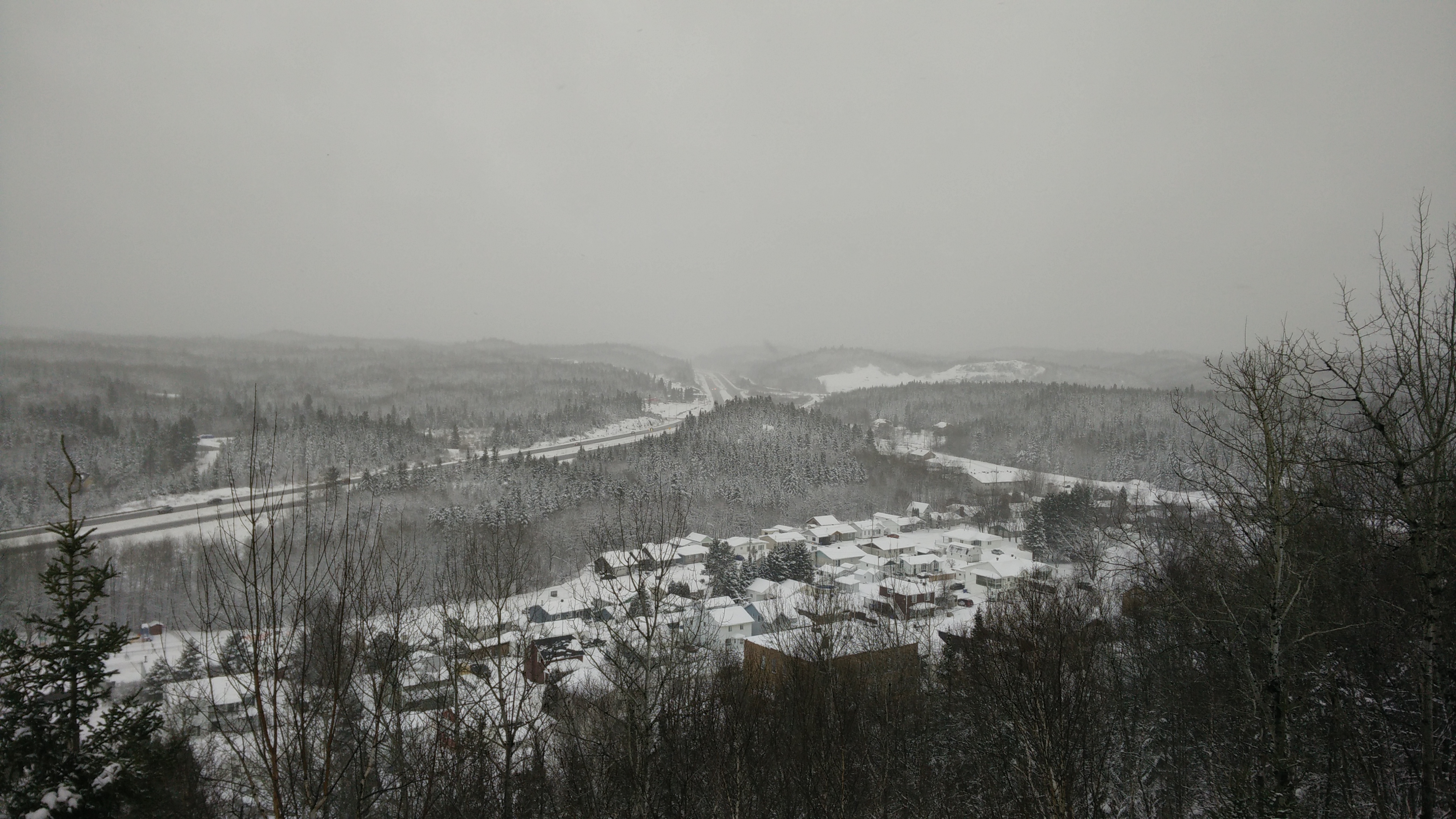

- Location in Saguenay–Lac-Saint-Jean Quebec
- Coordinates: 48°27′N 71°31′W
- Country: Canada
- Province: Quebec
- Region: Saguenay–Lac-Saint-Jean
- RCM: Le Fjord-du-Saguenay
- Settled: 1910
- Constituted: March 21, 1922
- Named for: William Larouche

Government
  - Mayor: Guy Lavoie
  - Federal riding: Jonquière—Hébertville—Pays-des-Bleuets
  - Prov. riding: Lac-Saint-Jean

Area
  - Total: 89.60 km^{2} (34.59 sq mi)
  - Land: 84.71 km^{2} (32.71 sq mi)

Population (2021)
  - Total: 1,601
  - Density: 18.9/km^{2} (49/sq mi)
  - Pop (2016–21): ▲7.7%
  - Dwellings: 829
- Time zone: UTC−5 (EST)
  - Summer (DST): UTC−4 (EDT)
- Postal code(s): G0W 1Z0
- Area codes: 418 and 581
- Highways: R-170
- Website: larouche.ca

Larouche (French pronunciation: [laʁuʃ]) is a municipality in Quebec, Canada, part of Le Fjord-du-Saguenay Regional County Municipality. It is located along Quebec Route 170 between Saguenay and Hébertville, just south of the Saguenay River.

== History ==
In the early 1910s, several families settled in the area. In 1911, the settlement got its post office and in 1922, the Parish Municipality of Larouche was incorporated, named after William Larouche (1835–1917), a pioneer who was among the area's first settlers.

In 2000, the parish municipality changed its status to municipality.

== Demographics ==
Historical Census Data - Larouche, Quebec
Year	Pop.	±%
1931	644	—
1941	874	+35.7%
1951	958	+9.6%
1956	731	−23.7%
1961	665	−9.0%
1966	614	−7.7%
1971	688	+12.1%
1976	788	+14.5%
1981	969	+23.0%
1986	1,069	+10.3%
1991	1,004	−6.1%
1996	1,049	+4.5%
2001	1,050	+0.1%
2006	1,200	+14.3%
2011	1,277	+6.4%
2016	1,586	+24.2%
2021	1,601	+0.9%

Private dwellings occupied by usual residents: 694 (total dwellings: 829)

Mother tongue:

- English as first language: 0.6%
- French as first language: 99.1%
- English and French as first language: 0%
- Other as first language: 0%
