= Hébertville =

- Municipality
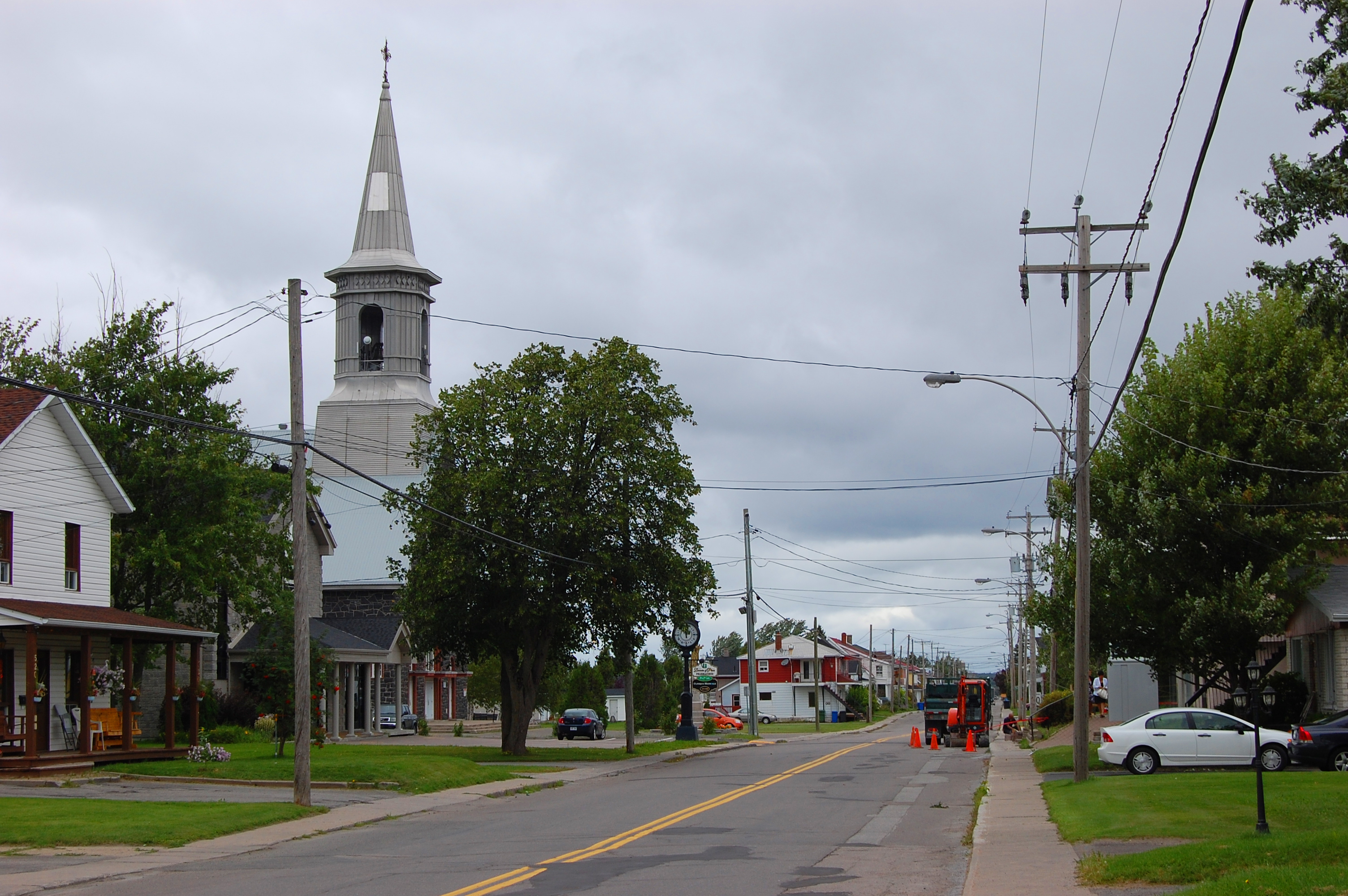
- Saint-Bruno church

- Location in Saguenay–Lac-Saint-Jean Quebec.
- Coordinates: 48°28′N 71°39′W
- Country: Canada
- Province: Quebec
- Region: Saguenay–Lac-Saint-Jean
- RCM: Lac-Saint-Jean-Est
- Constituted: January 1, 2026

Government
  - Mayor: Rotation
  - Federal riding: Jonquière—Hébertville—Pays-des-Bleuets
  - Prov. riding: Lac-Saint-Jean

Area
  - Municipality: 380.98 km^{2} (147.10 sq mi)
  - Land: 370.10 km^{2} (142.90 sq mi)
  - Urban: 1.16 km^{2} (0.45 sq mi)

Population (2021)
  - Municipality: 6,631
  - Density: 17.9/km^{2} (46/sq mi)
  - Urban: 1,868
  - Urban density: 1,616.9/km^{2} (4,188/sq mi)
  - Pop 2016-2021: ▼0.3%
  - Dwellings: 3,072
- Time zone: UTC−5 (EST)
  - Summer (DST): UTC−4 (EDT)
- Postal code(s): G8N,G0W 1L0, G0W 1T0
- Area codes: 418 and 581
- Highways: R-169; R-170
- Climate: Dfb
- Website: www.ville.hebertville.qc.ca

Hébertville (French pronunciation: [ebɛʁvil]) is a municipality in Quebec, Canada. The town is listed as a Village rélais.

== History ==
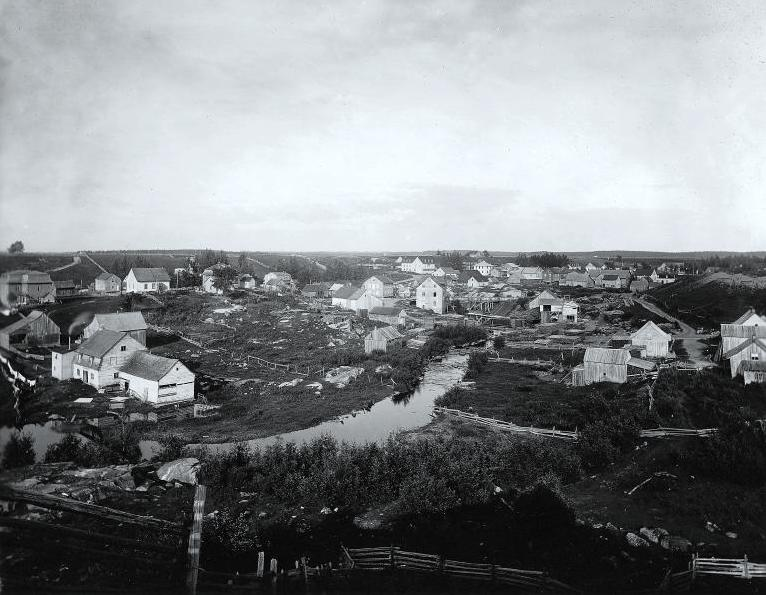
Hébertville in 1906

Hébertville was founded in 1849 and is named for the priest Nicolas-Tolentin Hébert (1810-1888), the son of Jean-Baptiste Hébert, a Patriot representative jailed in Montreal in 1837. It was the first establishment to be colonised in the Lac Saint-Jean area. This municipality offered a future development near the Aulnaies Falls, situated at the heart of the village.

At this location, saw and flour mills were constructed to provide work and food for the first inhabitants.

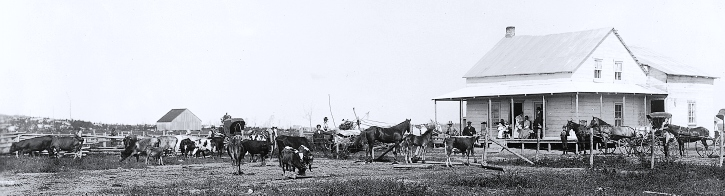
Eusèbe Simard farm in Hébertville around 1906

In 2026, Saint-Bruno and Hébertville-Station were merged with Hébertville.

== Demographics ==
In the 2021 Census of Population conducted by Statistics Canada, Hébertville had a population of 6,631 living in 2,850 of its 3,072 total private dwellings, a change of −0.3% from its 2016 population of 6,654. With a land area of 370.1 km^{2} (142.9 sq mi), it had a population density of 17.9/km^{2} (46.4/sq mi) in 2021.

== Economy ==
Bombardier Transportation has a minor engineering facility located in Hébertville.

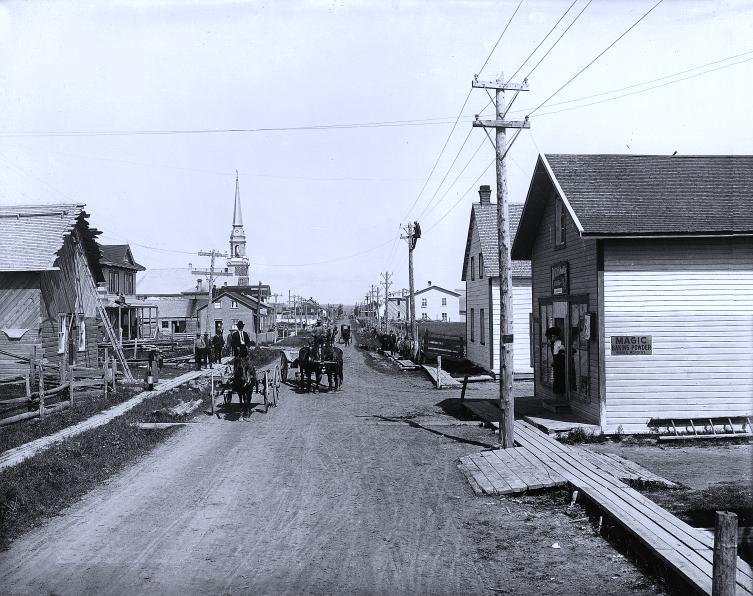
Saint-Bruno sector in 1906

== See also ==
- List of municipalities in Quebec
