= Quebec Route 170 =

Highway in Quebec, Canada

Route 170

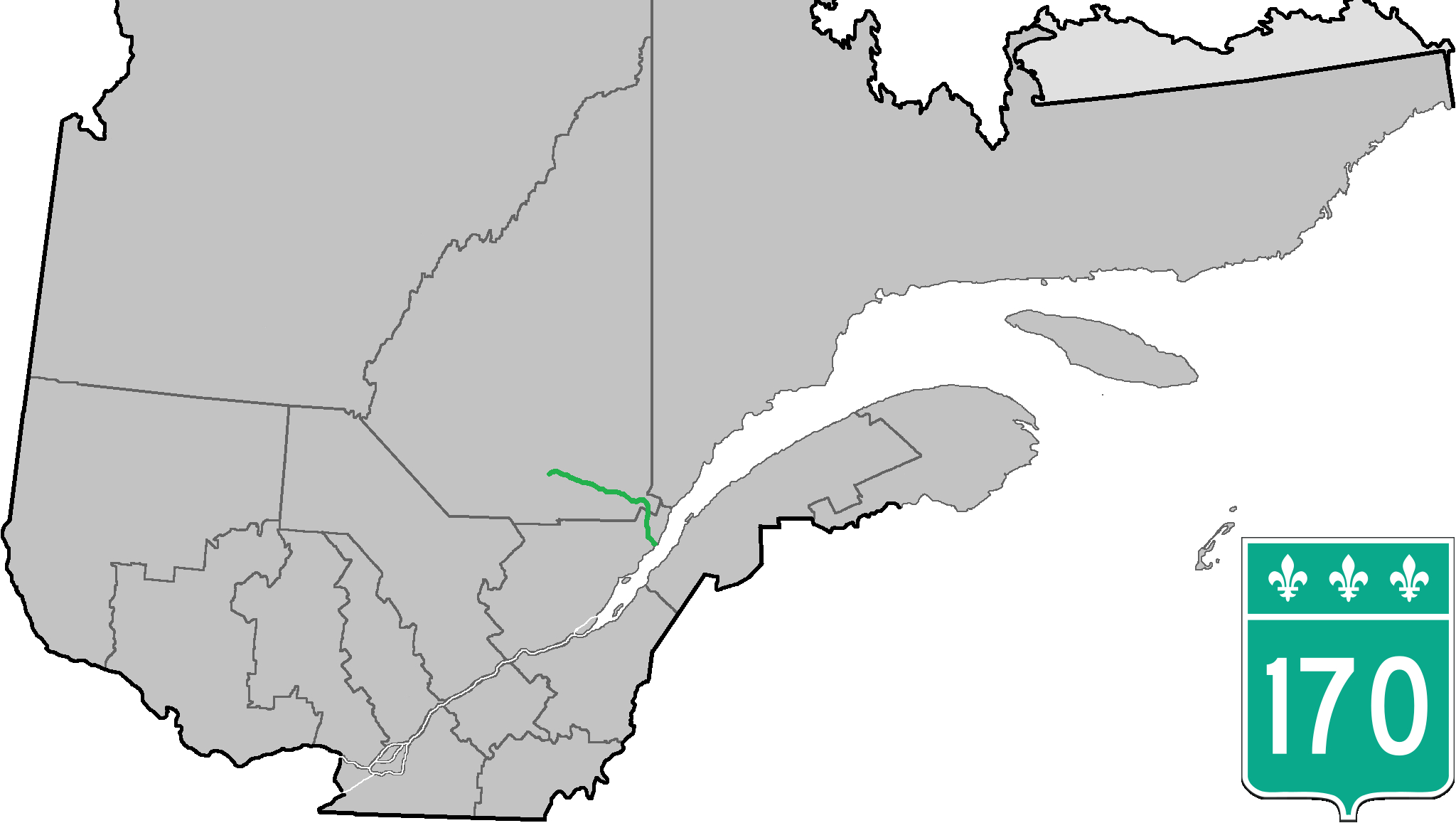

Route information
- Maintained by Transports Québec
- Length: 207.0 km (128.6 mi)
- History: Route 16; Route 16A

Major junctions
- West end: R-169 in Métabetchouan–Lac-à-la-Croix
- R-169 in Hébertville; A-70 / R-372 in Saguenay; A-70 / R-175 in Saguenay; R-372 / R-381 in Saguenay
- East end: R-138 in Saint-Siméon

Location
- Country: Canada
- Province: Quebec
- Major cities: Saguenay, Hébertville, Métabetchouan–Lac-à-la-Croix

Highway system
- Quebec provincial highways; Autoroutes; List; Former
← R-169	→ R-171

Route 170 is a major east/west highway on the north shore of the St. Lawrence River in Quebec, Canada, and it parallels the Saguenay River on the south side of it. The western terminus of Route 170 is in Métabetchouan–Lac-à-la-Croix at the junction of Route 169, at Lac Saint-Jean, and the eastern terminus is in Saint-Siméon, at the junction of Route 138, close to the Saint Lawrence River.

It is a busy highway in the Saguenay–Lac-Saint-Jean part as it links Saguenay's borough of La Baie, Chicoutimi and Jonquière together, and it provides the main link between the Lac-Saint-Jean and Saguenay areas. The stretch of road between Saguenay and Saint-Siméon is a very scenic ride in the mountains and providing access to roads leading to the Saguenay Fjord.

== Municipalities along Route 170 ==
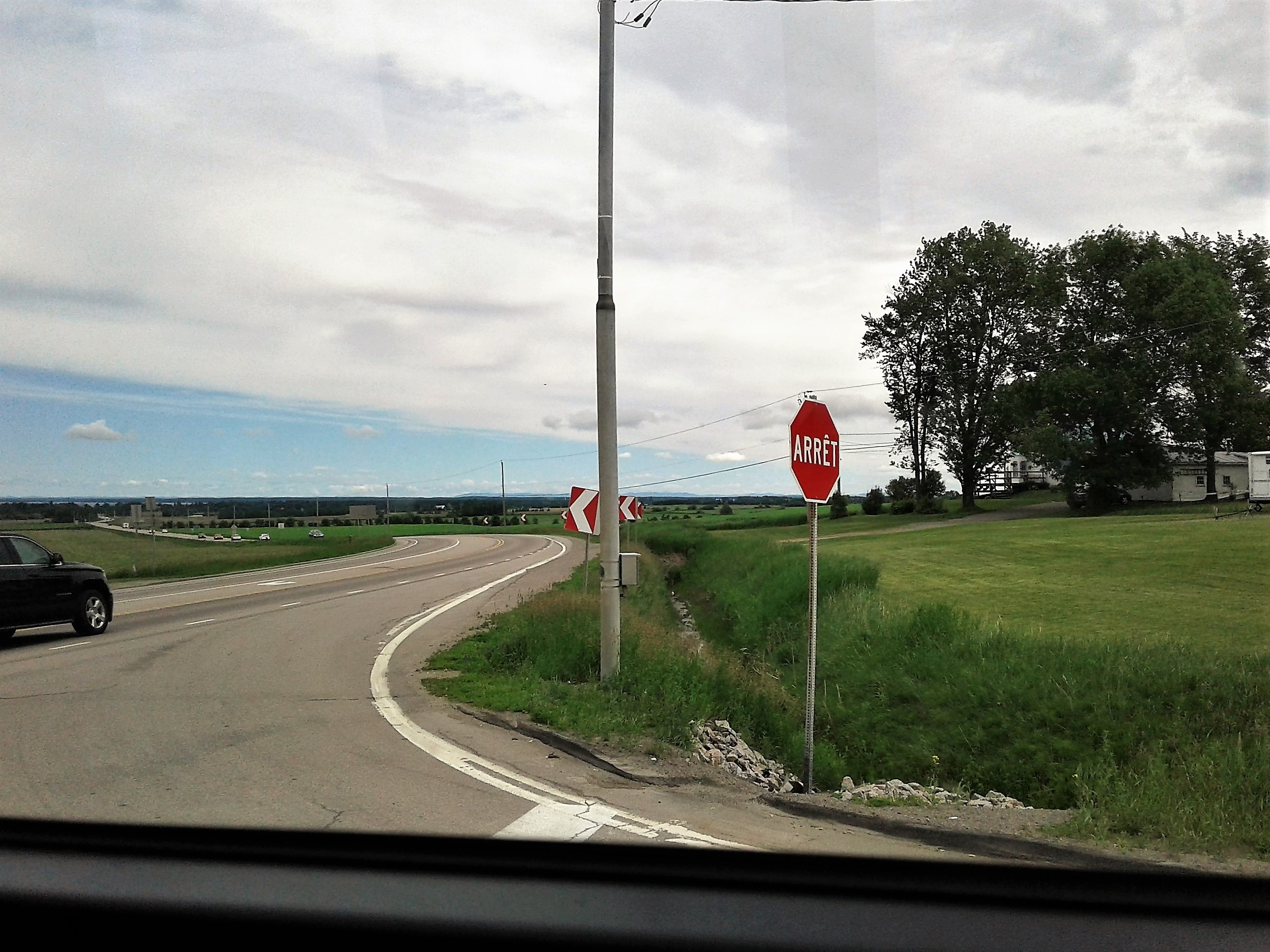
Beginning of Quebec Route 170 at its junction with Quebec Route 169 in Métabetchouan–Lac-à-la-Croix

- Métabetchouan–Lac-à-la-Croix
- Saint-Gédéon
- Hébertville
- Larouche
- Saguenay
- Saint-Felix-d'Otis
- Rivière-Éternité
- L'Anse-Saint-Jean
- Petit-Saguenay
- Saint-Siméon

== See also ==
- List of Quebec provincial highways
