= Alma, Quebec =

Alma
- Town
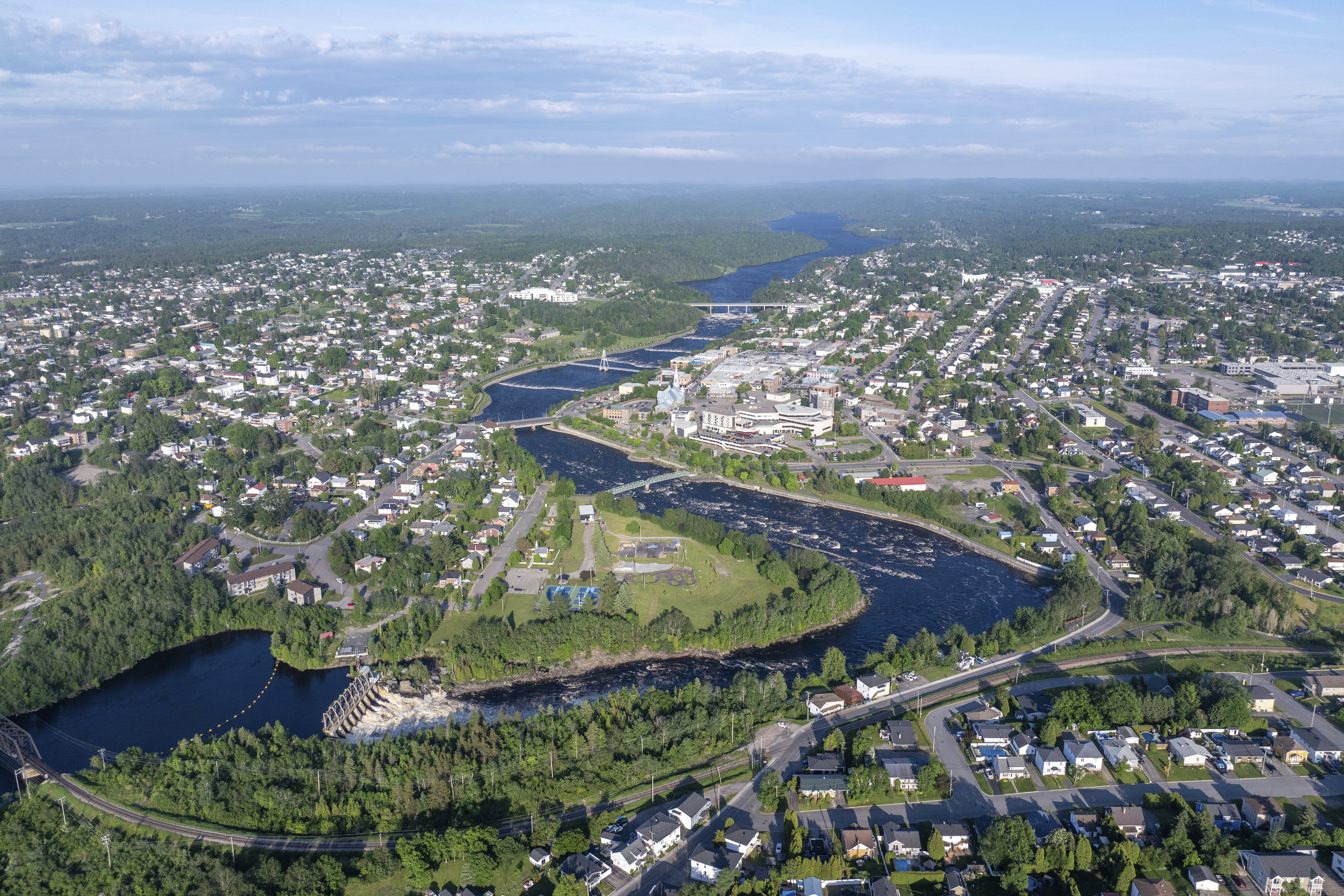
- Alma in 2026

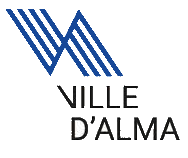
- Seal Coat of arms
- Motto: Crescit eundo

- Location in Saguenay–Lac-Saint-Jean Quebec
- Coordinates: 48°33′N 71°39′W
- Country: Canada
- Province: Quebec
- Region: Saguenay–Lac-Saint-Jean
- RCM: Lac-Saint-Jean-Est
- Amalgamation: 1962 (of Isle-Maligne, Naudville, Riverbend and St-Joseph d'Alma.)
- Constituted: February 21, 2001 (amalgamation with Delisle)

Government
  - Mayor: Sylvie Beaumont
  - Federal riding: Lac-Saint-Jean
  - Prov. riding: Lac-Saint-Jean

Area
  - Town: 230.30 km^{2} (88.92 sq mi)
  - Land: 194.92 km^{2} (75.26 sq mi)
  - Urban: 15.94 km^{2} (6.15 sq mi)

Population (2021)
  - Town: 30,331
  - Density: 155.6/km^{2} (403/sq mi)
  - Urban: 20,274
  - Urban density: 1,272.2/km^{2} (3,295/sq mi)
  - Pop 2016-2021: ▼1.4%
  - Dwellings: 14,493
- Time zone: UTC−5 (EST)
  - Summer (DST): UTC−4 (EDT)
- Postal code(s): G8B, G8C & G8E
- Area codes: 418 and 581
- Highways: R-169; R-170; R-172
- Telephone Exchanges: 212, 321, 480-2, 487, 662, 668-9, 719, 720, 769
- NTS Map: 22D12 Alma
- GNBC Code: EFHQD
- Website: www.ville.alma.qc.ca

Alma (French pronunciation: [alma]; 2021 Town population: 30,331; UA Population 20,274) is a town in Saguenay–Lac-Saint-Jean, in the Canadian province of Quebec.

== History ==
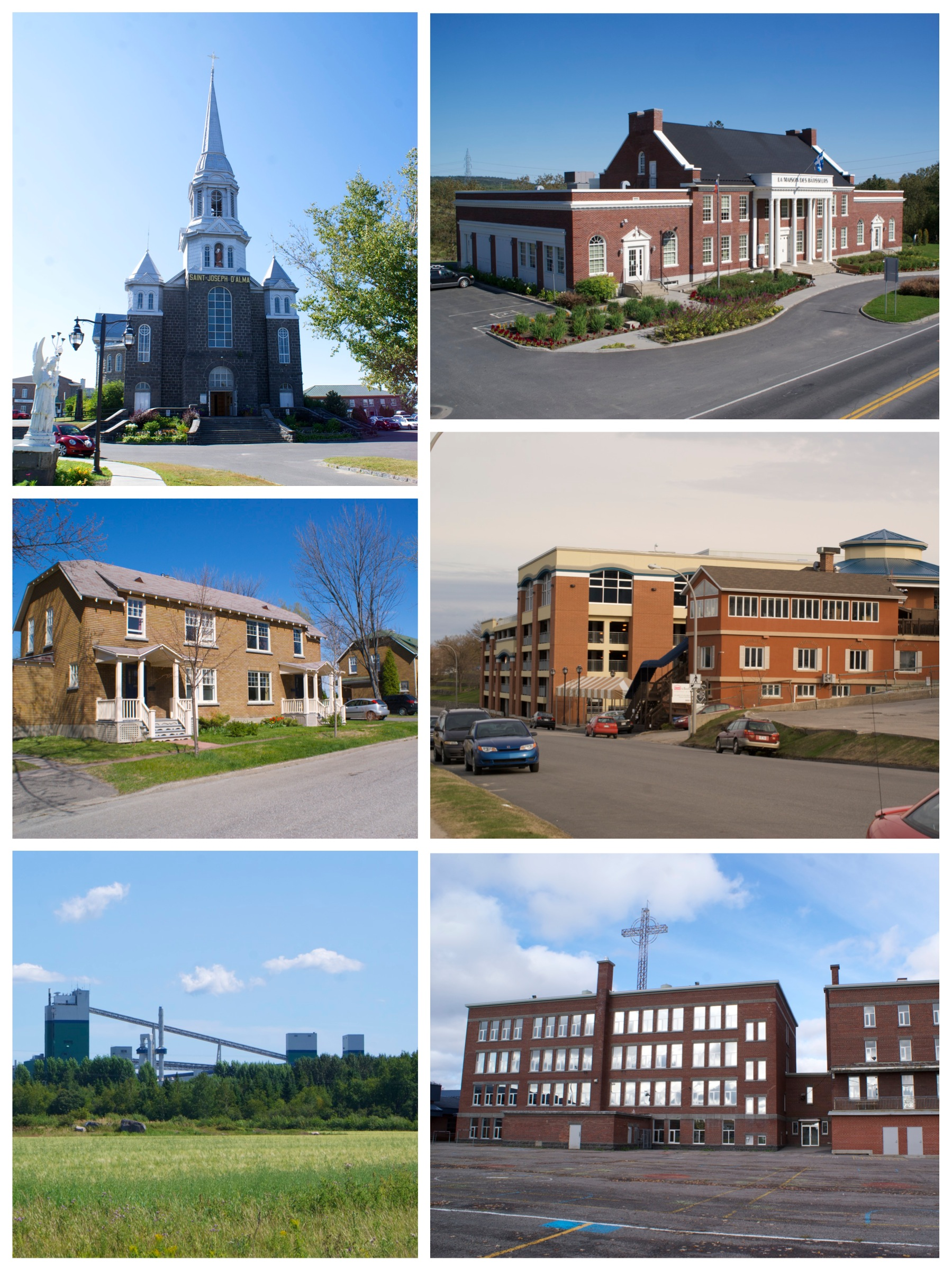
Mosaic of buildings in Alma

The present town of Alma was formed in 1962 from the merging of four villages: Isle-Maligne, Naudville, Riverbend and St-Joseph d'Alma. In 2002, Alma merged with the Municipality of Delisle. The oldest of the villages, St-Joseph-d'Alma, was founded in 1867 by Damase Boulanger. Both modern day Alma and St-Joseph d'Alma are named after the Battle of the Alma.

The area became an important industrial centre during the 1920s and 1930s with the construction of a hydro-electrical power station on the Grande-Décharge River, a paper mill (Price) and an aluminum smelting plant (Alcan), all of which are still in activity today.

== Geography ==
Alma is located on the southeast coast of Lac Saint-Jean where it flows into the Saguenay River, in the Saguenay–Lac-Saint-Jean region of Quebec, Canada, approximately 175 km north of Quebec City. Alma is the seat of Lac-Saint-Jean-Est Regional County Municipality. Alma is the second largest city in population in the Saguenay-Lac-Saint-Jean region after the city of Saguenay.

Alma is the seat of the judicial district of Alma.

== Demographics ==
Alma Population
Year	Pop.	±%
1921	850	—
1931	3,970	+367.1%
1941	6,449	+62.4%
1951	7,975	+23.7%
1956	10,822	+35.7%
1961	13,309	+23.0%
1966	22,195	+66.8%
1971	24,956	+12.4%
1976	25,638	+2.7%
1981	26,322	+2.7%
1986	25,923	−1.5%
1991	25,910	−0.1%
1996	26,127	+0.8%
2001	25,918	−0.8%
2006	29,998	+15.7%
2011	30,904	+3.0%
2016	30,771	−0.4%
2021	30,331	−1.4%
Statistics Canada

In the 2021 Census of Population conducted by Statistics Canada, Alma had a population of 30,331 living in 13,815 of its 14,493 total private dwellings, a change of −1.4% from its 2016 population of 30,771. With a land area of 194.92 km^{2} (75.26 sq mi), it had a population density of 155.6/km^{2} (403.0/sq mi) in 2021.

=== Language ===
As of the 2021 Census, 81% of residents in Alma reported their knowledge of official languages being French only. 18.8% had knowledge of both English and French, while a small number reported only knowing English (0.1%). English was the mother tongue for 0.4% of residents, while French was the mother tongue for 98.9%. (Note: The 2021 Census of Population defines mother tongue as being the first language learn at home that is still understood by the person at the time the census was conducted.)

Knowledge of Official Languages
Language	Count	%
English Only	20	0.1%
French Only	24,315	81.0%
Both English and French	5,655	18.8%
Neither English nor French	20	0.1%

Mother Tongue (Note: Mother tongue responses are separated by single responses and multiple responses. The data for English, French and non-official language as mother tongue reflect the population that gave single responses only.)
Language	Count	%
English	125	0.4%
French	29,550	98.9%
Non-official language	215	0.7%
English and French	85	0.3%

First Official Language Spoken
Language	Count	%
English	115	0.4%
French	29,855	99.5%
English and French	25	0.1%
Neither English nor French	20	0.1%

=== Ethnicity ===
Visible minority and Aboriginal population (Canada 2021 Census)
Population group		Population	% of total population
White		28,015	95.5%
Visible minority group Source:	South Asian	0	0%
Visible minority group Source:	Chinese	55	0.2%
Visible minority group Source:	Black	185	0.6%
Visible minority group Source:	Filipino	15	0.1%
Visible minority group Source:	Arab	35	0.1%
Visible minority group Source:	Latin American	30	0.1%
Visible minority group Source:	Southeast Asian	35	0.1%
Visible minority group Source:	West Asian	0	0%
Visible minority group Source:	Korean	0	0%
Visible minority group Source:	Japanese	0	0%
Visible minority group Source:	Visible minority, n.i.e.	0	0%
Visible minority group Source:	Multiple visible minority	10	0%
Total visible minority population		375	1.3%
Aboriginal group Source:	First Nations	350	1.2%
Aboriginal group Source:	Métis	500	1.7%
Aboriginal group Source:	Inuk	10	0%
Aboriginal group Source:	Aboriginal, n.i.e.	65	0.2%
Aboriginal group Source:	Multiple Aboriginal identity	10	0%
Total Aboriginal population		935	3.2%
Total population		29,325	100%

== Infrastructure ==
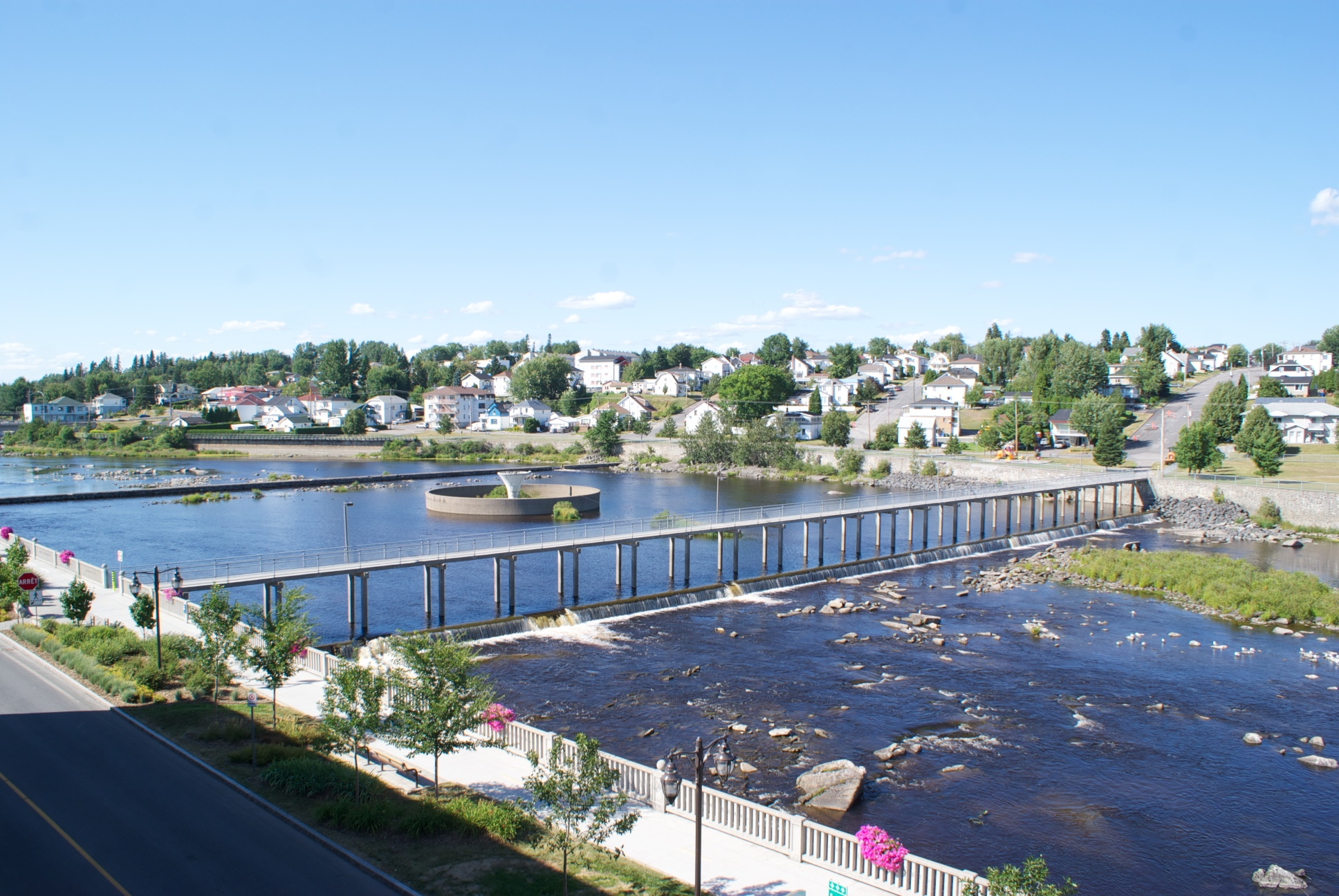
Petite-Décharge

=== Transportation ===
Alma is serviced by the Alma Airport, located 4.1 km to the south of the town.

== Sister cities ==
Alma has been twinned with Falaise, Calvados, France, since 1969.

== Notable people ==
- Camille Bedard, hockey player
- Chris Boucher, basketball player for the Toronto Raptors
- Lucien Bouchard, former premier of Québec
- Guy Cloutier, producer and artist manager
- Guillaume Desbiens, hockey player
- Michel Harvey, hockey player for the Quebec Nordiques
- Charles Hudon, hockey player for the Ontario Reign
- Pierre Lapointe, singer
- Émilie Fortin Tremblay (1872–1949), one of the first white women to cross the Chilkoot on the way to the Yukon gold fields
- François-Louis Tremblay, Olympic gold medallist short-track speed skater
- Mario Tremblay, hockey player and former coach of the Montreal Canadiens

== See also ==
- List of cities in Quebec
