= Gilbert River (Cyriac River tributary) =

- Location within Quebec

Location
- Country: Canada
- Province: Quebec
- Region: Saguenay-Lac-Saint-Jean
- Regional County Municipality: Le Fjord-du-Saguenay Regional County Municipality
- Unorganized territory and a city: Lac-Ministuk

Physical characteristics
- Source: Lac Prud’homme
  - location: Lac-Ministuk
  - coordinates: 48.04351°N 71.26195°W
  - elevation: 720
- Mouth: Cyriac River
  - location: Lac-Ministuk
  - coordinates: 48.09722°N 71.24805°W
  - elevation: 480 m (1,570 ft)
- Length: 8.4 km (5.2 mi)
- Discharge
  - location: Lac-Ministuk

Basin features
- River system: Saguenay River

The Gilbert River is a freshwater tributary of the Cyriac River, flowing in the unorganized territory of Lac-Ministuk, in the Le Fjord-du-Saguenay Regional County Municipality, in the administrative region of Saguenay–Lac-Saint-Jean, in the province of Quebec, in Canada.

The Gilbert River is accessible by route 175; other secondary forest roads have been developed in the sector for the needs of forestry and recreational tourism activities.

Forestry is the primary economic activity in the sector; recreational tourism, second.

The surface of the Gilbert River is usually frozen from late November to early April, however safe circulation on the ice is generally from mid-December to late March.

== Geography ==
The main watersheds adjacent to the Gilbert River are:

- north side: Cyriac River, Lac des Îlets, Simoncouche Lake, Simoncouche River, Saguenay River;
- east side: Cyriac river, Savane brook, rivière du Moulin, Bras Sec;
- south side: Petite rivière Pikauba, Talbot Lake, Pikauba River, Ovide stream;
- west side: Petite rivière Pikauba, Minustuk lake, Cyriac lake, Pikauba River, Bras des Angers.

The Gilbert River has its source at Prud’homme Lake (length: 0.3 km (0.19 mi); altitude: 720 m (2,360 ft)). The northern mouth of Lake Prud’homme is located at:

- 1.4 km (0.87 mi) southwest of route 175
- 2.6 km (1.6 mi) south-west of the course of the Cyriac River;
- 3.7 km (2.3 mi) north-east of the course of the Petite rivière Pikauba;
- 6.1 km (3.8 mi) south-east of the confluence of the Gilbert river and the Cyriac River.

From Lac Prud'homme, the course of the Gilbert River generally flows west, then north, over 8.4 km (5.2 mi), with a drop of 240 km (150 mi) entirely in forest areas, according to the following segments:

- 2.7 km (1.7 mi) towards the west curving towards the north, then crossing a small lake (length: 0.7 km (0.43 mi); altitude: 590 m (1,940 ft)), to its mouth;
- 1.9 km (1.2 mi) towards the north curving towards the northeast, up to a bend in the river;
- 1.8 km (1.1 mi) northerly, up to the highway 175 bridge;
- 0.5 km (0.31 mi) northerly, along the west side of route 175, to a stream (coming from the west);
- 1.5 km (0.93 mi) towards the northeast, along the west side of route 175, to its mouth.

The Gilbert River flows onto the west bank of the Cyriac River. This confluence is located at:

- 2.7 km (1.7 mi) east of the southern bay of Lac Cyriac;
- 8.4 km (5.2 mi) west of the course of the Moulin river;
- 0.3 km (0.19 mi) east of route 175;
- 17.1 km (10.6 mi) north-east of route 169;
- 19.0 km (11.8 mi) north-east of the locality Mont-Apica;
- 23.0 km (14.3 mi) south-east of the confluence of the Cyriac river and Kenogami Lake;
- 39.2 km (24.4 mi) south of the confluence of the Chicoutimi River and the Saguenay River.

From the confluence of the Gilbert river with the Cyriac river, the current descends the latter on 34.2 km (21.3 mi) to the north, then the current crosses Lake Kénogami on 6.3 km (3.9 mi) northeasterly to barrage de Portage-des-Roches, then follows the course of the Chicoutimi river on 26.2 km (16.3 mi) eastward, then northeasterly and course of the Saguenay river on 114.6 km (71.2 mi) eastward to Tadoussac where it merges with the Saint Lawrence estuary.

== Toponymy ==
The toponym “Gilbert River” was formalized on December 5, 1968, at the Place Names Bank of the Commission de toponymie du Québec.

== Appendices ==
=== Related articles ===
- Le Fjord-du-Saguenay Regional County Municipality
- Lac-Ministuk, an unorganized territory
- Laurentides Wildlife Reserve
- Cyriac River
- Kenogami Lake
- Chicoutimi River
- Saguenay River
- St. Lawrence River
- List of rivers of Quebec
