= Petite rivière Jean-Boivin =

- Location within Quebec

Location
- Country: Canada
- Province: Quebec
- Region: Saguenay-Lac-Saint-Jean
- Regional County Municipality: Le Fjord-du-Saguenay Regional County Municipality
- Unorganized territory and a city: Lac-Ministuk

Physical characteristics
- Source: Unidentified lake
  - location: Lac-Ministuk
  - coordinates: 48°13′01″N 71°24′51″W
  - elevation: 370
- Mouth: Jean-Boivin River
  - location: Lac-Ministuk
  - coordinates: 48°13′55″N 71°22′21″W
  - elevation: 329 m (1,079 ft)
- Length: 3.9 km (2.4 mi)
- Discharge
  - location: Lac-Ministuk

Basin features
- River system: Saguenay River

The petite rivière Jean-Boivin is a freshwater tributary of the Jean-Boivin River, flowing in the unorganized territory of Lac-Ministuk, in the Le Fjord-du-Saguenay Regional County Municipality, in the administrative region of Saguenay–Lac-Saint-Jean, in province of Quebec, in Canada. The upper course of the little Jean-Boivin river crosses the Laurentides Wildlife Reserve.

The valley of the "petite rivière Jean-Boivin" is located between route 175 and route 169; other secondary forest roads have been developed in the sector for forestry and recreational tourism activities.

Forestry is the primary economic activity in the sector; recreational tourism, second.

The surface of the small Jean-Boivin river is usually frozen from the end of November to the beginning of April, however the safe circulation on the ice is generally made from mid-December to the end of March.

== Geography ==
The main watersheds neighboring the little Jean-Boivin river are:

- north side: Jean-Boivin River, Cyriac River, McDonald Lake, McDonald Creek, Patrie Creek, Kenogami Lake, Saguenay River;
- east side: Jean-Boivin River, Cyriac River, Hector stream, Normand River;
- south side: Petite rivière Pikauba, the Grand Ruisseau, Pikauba River;
- west side: Pikauba River, la Blague stream.

The "Petite rivière Jean-Boivin" takes its source from an unidentified lake (length: 0.4 km (0.25 mi); altitude: 370 m (1,210 ft)). The northern mouth of this head lake is located at:

- 2.2 km (1.4 mi) west of the Jean-Boivin River;
- 2.7 km (1.7 mi) north-east of a curve of the Petite rivière Pikauba;
- 10.7 km (6.6 mi) south of Kénogami Lake;
- 11.3 km (7.0 mi) south-west of route 175;
- 3.5 km (2.2 mi) south-west of the confluence of the small Jean-Boivin river and the Jean-Boivin river.

From the small head lake, the course of the small Jean-Boivin river flows over 3.9 km (2.4 mi) entirely in the forest zone, with a drop of 41 km (25 mi), depending on the segments following:

- 1.7 km (1.1 mi) towards the north-east, curving towards the north-east, up to a bend in a river where a stream (coming from the south-east) flows there;
- 0.5 km (0.31 mi) to the north, forming a curve to the east, to a stream (coming from the northwest);
- 1.7 km (1.1 mi) towards the northeast, curving towards the east, to its mouth.

The "Petite rivière Jean-Boivin" flows into a bend on the west bank of the Jean-Boivin River. This confluence is located at:

- 5.2 km (3.2 mi) south-east of the confluence of the Jean-Boivin River and the Cyriac River;
- 8.2 km (5.1 mi) west of route 175;
- 8.8 km (5.5 mi) southwest of Simoncouche Lake;
- 9.1 km (5.7 mi) north-east of the confluence of the Pikauba River and the Petite rivière Pikauba;
- 9.7 km (6.0 mi) south-east of the confluence of the Cyriac River and Kenogami Lake;
- 14.7 km (9.1 mi) south-west of the barrage de Portage-des-Roches;
- 31.3 km (19.4 mi) south-west of the confluence of the Chicoutimi River and the Saguenay river.

From the confluence of the small Jean-Boivin river with the Jean-Boivin river, the current descends successively the latter on 6.3 km (3.9 mi) towards the northeast, the course of the Cyriac river on 5.6 km (3.5 mi) to the north, then the current crosses Kénogami Lake on 6.3 km (3.9 mi) north-east to the dam of Portage-des-Roches, then follows the course of the Chicoutimi river on 26.2 km (16.3 mi) to the east, then the northeast and the Saguenay river course on 114.6 km (71.2 mi) east to Tadoussac where it merges with the Saint Lawrence estuary.

== Toponymy ==
The toponym "Petite rivière Jean-Boivin" was formalized on June 1, 1971, at the Place Names Bank of the Commission de toponymie du Québec.

== See also ==
- Le Fjord-du-Saguenay Regional County Municipality
- Lac-Ministuk, a TNO
- Laurentides Wildlife Reserve
- Jean-Boivin River
- Cyriac River
- Kenogami Lake
- Chicoutimi River
- Saguenay River
- St. Lawrence River
- List of rivers of Quebec
