= Jean-Boivin River =

- Location within Quebec

Location
- Country: Canada
- Province: Quebec
- Region: Saguenay-Lac-Saint-Jean
- Regional County Municipality: Le Fjord-du-Saguenay Regional County Municipality
- Unorganized territory and a city: Lac-Ministuk

Physical characteristics
- Source: Petit lac Richelieu
  - location: Lac-Ministuk
  - coordinates: 48°09′13″N 71°20′49″W
  - elevation: 584
- Mouth: Cyriac River
  - location: Lac-Ministuk
  - coordinates: 48°15′42″N 71°19′11″W
  - elevation: 250 m (820 ft)
- Length: 18.1 km (11.2 mi)
- Discharge
  - location: Lac-Ministuk

Basin features
- River system: Saguenay River
- Tributaries
  - left: (from the mouth) Décharge du lac Adrien, petite rivière Jean-Boivin, décharge du lac Lavade.
  - right: (from the mouth) Ruisseau Filion, Décharge des lacs Ève et Adam.

The Jean-Boivin River is a freshwater tributary of the Cyriac River, flowing in the unorganized territory of Lac-Ministuk, in the Le Fjord-du-Saguenay Regional County Municipality, in the administrative region of Saguenay–Lac-Saint-Jean, in province from Quebec, to Canada. The upper and intermediate course of the Jean-Boivin river crosses the Laurentides Wildlife Reserve.

The Jean-Boivin River is accessible by the route 175; other secondary forest roads have been developed in the sector for the needs of forestry and recreational tourism activities.

Forestry is the primary economic activity in the sector; recreational tourism, second.

The surface of the Jean-Boivin River is usually frozen from the end of November to the beginning of April, however the safe circulation on the ice is generally made from mid-December to the end of March.

== Geography ==
The main watersheds neighboring the Jean-Boivin River are:

- north side: Cyriac River, Simoncouche Lake, Simoncouche River, Kenogami Lake, Saguenay River;
- east side: Cyriac river, Lac des Îlets, Grimard lake, Cyriac lake, Lecompte lake, rivière du Moulin, Bras Sec;
- south side: Chavary lake, Ministuk lake, Petite rivière Pikauba, Lévesque lake, Yvette lake;
- west side: Hector stream, Richelieu lake, Petite rivière Pikauba, Minustuk lake, Cyriac lake, Pikauba River.

The Jean-Boivin River rises at the mouth of Petit lac Richelieu (length: 0.35 km (0.22 mi); altitude: 584 km (363 mi)). The northern mouth of the lake is located at:

- 2.4 km (1.5 mi) west of the course of the Normand River;
- 3.4 km (2.1 mi) north-east of a curve of the Petite rivière Pikauba;
- 3.2 km (2.0 mi) north-west of Lac Grimard;
- 8.1 km (5.0 mi) south-west of route 175;
- 12.2 km (7.6 mi) south of the confluence of the Jean-Boivin river and the Cyriac River.

From little Richelieu Lake, the course of the Jean-Boivin river flows over 18.1 km (11.2 mi) entirely in the forest zone, with a drop of 334 km (208 mi), according to the following segments:

- 0.5 km (0.31 mi) towards the west, in particular by crossing on 0.4 km (0.25 mi) Lake Richelieu (length: 0.6 km (0.37 mi); altitude: 579 m (1,900 ft)), to its mouth;
- 0.8 km (0.50 mi) towards the northwest in particular by crossing on 0.3 km (0.19 mi) Boivin Lake (length: 0.5 km (0.31 mi); altitude: 524 m (1,719 ft)), to its mouth;
- 1.4 km (0.87 mi) north-east in a deep valley to the outlet (coming from the north) of lakes Eve and Adam;
- 2.3 km (1.4 mi) north-west, to the outlet (coming from the west) of Lac Lavade;
- 6.8 km (4.2 mi) towards the north in a deep valley at the start of the segment and leaving mid-segment of the territory of the Laurentides Wildlife Reserve, up to the confluence (coming from the 'west) of the Petite Rivière Jean-Boivin;
- 3.9 km (2.4 mi) north, then northeast, to Filion stream (coming from the south);
- 2.4 km (1.5 mi) towards the north-east in a deep valley, then bending towards the east to go around a mountain, to its mouth.

The Jean-Boivin river flows on the west bank of the Cyriac river. This confluence is located at:

- 0.8 km (0.50 mi) west of the city limit of Saguenay;
- 5.2 km (3.2 mi) west of Simoncouche Lake;
- 4.9 km (3.0 mi) west of route 175;
- 4.9 km (3.0 mi) east of Lake McDonald;
- 5.2 km (3.2 mi) north-east of the confluence of the Jean-Boivin river and the Petite rivière Jean-Boivin;
- 4.8 km (3.0 mi) south of the confluence of the Cyriac River and Kenogami Lake;
- 9.6 km (6.0 mi) south-west of the barrage de Portage-des-Roches;
- 26.0 km (16.2 mi) south-west of the confluence of the Chicoutimi River and the Saguenay River.

From the confluence of the Jean-Boivin river with the Cyriac River, the current descends the latter on 5.6 km (3.5 mi) to the north, then the current crosses Kenogami Lake on 6.3 km (3.9 mi) northeasterly to the dam of Portage-des-Roches, then follows the course of the Chicoutimi river on 26.2 km (16.3 mi) eastward, then northeasterly and the course of the Saguenay River on 114.6 km (71.2 mi) eastward to Tadoussac where it merges with the Saint Lawrence estuary.

== Toponymy ==
The toponym "Jean-Boivin River" was formalized on December 5, 1968, at the Place Names Bank of the Commission de toponymie du Québec.

== See also ==
- Le Fjord-du-Saguenay Regional County Municipality
- Lac-Ministuk, an unorganized territory
- Laurentides Wildlife Reserve
- Petite rivière Jean-Boivin
- Cyriac River
- Kenogami Lake
- Chicoutimi River
- Saguenay River
- St. Lawrence River
- List of rivers of Quebec
