= Ruisseau L'Abbé =

- Location within Quebec

Location
- Country: Canada
- Province: Quebec
- Region: Saguenay-Lac-Saint-Jean
- Regional County Municipality: Le Fjord-du-Saguenay Regional County Municipality
- Unorganized territory and a city: Lac-Ministuk

Physical characteristics
- Source: Unidentified little lake
  - location: Lac-Ministuk
  - coordinates: 48.32845°N 71.67960°W
  - elevation: 310
- Mouth: Pikauba River
  - location: Lac-Ministuk
  - coordinates: 48.23194°N 71.37222°W
  - elevation: 211 m (692 ft)
- Length: 19.3 km (12.0 mi)
- Discharge
  - location: Lac-Ministuk

Basin features
- Tributaries
  - left: (from the mouth) Ruisseau Galbraith, décharge du lac Moïse, décharge des lacs Brulé et Sarcelle, décharge du lac Florian.
  - right: (from the mouth) Décharge du lac Robertson, décharge du lac Glacé, du lac Ratté et du lac Alexis, ruisseau Luppanay, décharge d’un ensemble de lacs dont le Lac à Tranche et le lac Castor, décharge du lac de l’Écluse.

The ruisseau L'Abbé (English: L'Abbé stream) is a freshwater tributary of the Pikauba River, flowing in the unorganized territory of Lac-Ministuk, in the Le Fjord-du-Saguenay Regional County Municipality, in the administrative region of Saguenay–Lac-Saint-Jean, in province, in Quebec, to Canada.

The upper part of the ruisseau L’Abbé valley is accessible by route 169; other secondary forest roads have been developed in the sector for forestry and recreational tourism activities.

Forestry is the primary economic activity in the sector; recreational tourism, second.

The surface of L’Abbé Creek is usually frozen from late November to early April, however safe circulation on the ice is generally from mid-December to late March.

== Geography ==
The main watersheds adjacent to ruisseau L’Abbé are:

- north side: Galbraith stream, Moïse lake, rivière aux Sables, Kenogami Lake, Saguenay River, Vert Lake (Hébertville);
- east side: Pikauba River, Patrie Creek, McDonald Creek, Gagnon Creek, Cyriac River, Chicoutimi River;
- south side: Luppanay stream, Pikauba River, rivière aux Écorces, Petite rivière Pikauba;
- west side: Pikauba River, Belle Rivière stream, La Belle Rivière, Couchepaganiche East River, Métabetchouane River.

L’Abbé stream rises from a very small unidentified lake (altitude: 310 m (1,020 ft)) on the eastern flank of Mont Hudon-Beaulieu. The northern mouth of this head lake is located at:

- 4.6 km (2.9 mi) south of Vert Lake (Hébertville);
- 18.2 km (11.3 mi) south-east of lac Saint-Jean;
- 18.6 km (11.6 mi) south-west of Kenogami Lake;
- 0.8 km (0.50 mi) north-west of route 169;
- 14.1 km (8.8 mi) south-west of the confluence of ruisseau L’Abbé and Pikauba River.

From the small head lake, the course of the ruisseau L’Abbé flows over 19.3 km (12.0 mi) entirely in the forest zone, with a drop of 99 km (62 mi), according to the following segments:

Upper stream of ruisseau L’Abbé (segment of 9.2 km (5.7 mi))

- 2.0 km (1.2 mi) north-east, up to a bend in the river;
- 4.2 km (2.6 mi) towards the east by collecting the discharge (coming from the northeast) of the Florian lake and the discharge (coming from the southwest) of the lake of Écluse, until the discharge (from the northwest) of Brulé and Sarcelle lakes;
- 1.5 km (0.93 mi) south-east in a deep valley, until the discharge (coming from the south) of a set of lakes including Lac à la Tranche, lac à Brod and lac Beaver;
- 1.5 km (0.93 mi) east to Luppanay stream (coming from the south);

Lower stream of ruisseau L’Abbé (segment of 10.1 km (6.3 mi))

- 2.6 km (1.6 mi) northward curving northeast, to the outlet (coming from the northwest) of Lake Moses;
- 1.4 km (0.87 mi) east, curving south, to Galbraith Creek (coming from the north);
- 3.0 km (1.9 mi) southeasterly, up to Plessis stream (coming from the southwest) which drains Lac Glacé, Lac Ratté and Lac Plessis;
- 1.3 km (0.81 mi) east in a deep valley, to the outlet (coming from the south) of Lake Robertson;
- 1.8 km (1.1 mi) north-east in a deep valley, to its mouth.

L’Abbé stream flows into a bend on the west bank of the Pikauba River. This confluence is located at:

- 11.0 km (6.8 mi) south-west of the village center of Saint-Cyriac;
- 4.8 km (3.0 mi) west of the confluence of the Pikauba river and Kenogami Lake;
- 21.0 km (13.0 mi) south-west of the barrage de Portage-des-Roches;
- 14.6 km (9.1 mi) west of Highway 169;
- 34.3 km (21.3 mi) south-west of the confluence of the Chicoutimi River and the Saguenay River;
- 30.7 km (19.1 mi) south-east of the shore of lac Saint-Jean.

From the confluence of L'Abbé stream with the Pikauba River, the current successively descends the Pikauba River on 8.4 km (5.2 mi) to the northeast, then the current crosses Kenogami Lake on 17.6 km (10.9 mi) north-east to the dam of Portage-des-Roches, then follow the course of the Chicoutimi river on 26.2 km (16.3 mi) towards the east, then the northeast, and the course of the Saguenay River on 114.6 km (71.2 mi) towards the east until Tadoussac where it merges with the Saint Lawrence estuary.

== Toponymy ==
The toponym "ruisseau L'Abbé" was formalized on December 5, 1968, at the Place Names Bank of the Commission de toponymie du Québec.

== Appendices ==
=== Related articles ===
- Le Fjord-du-Saguenay Regional County Municipality
- Lac-Ministuk, a TNO
- Pikauba River
- Kenogami Lake
- Chicoutimi River
- Saguenay River
- St. Lawrence River
- List of rivers of Quebec
