= Bras des Angers =

Creek in Quebec, Canada

- Location within Quebec

Location
- Country: Canada
- Province: Quebec
- Region: Saguenay-Lac-Saint-Jean
- Regional County Municipality: Le Fjord-du-Saguenay Regional County Municipality
- Unorganized territory and a city: Lac-Ministuk

Physical characteristics
- Source: Confluence of two forest streams
  - location: Lac-Ministuk
  - coordinates: 48.15046°N 71.52982°W
  - elevation: 430
- Mouth: Pikauba River
  - location: Lac-Ministuk
  - coordinates: 48.12028°N 71.47722°W
  - elevation: 410 m (1,350 ft)
- Length: 5.9 km (3.7 mi)
- Discharge
  - location: Lac-Ministuk

The Bras des Angers (English: arm of Angers) is a tributary of the Pikauba River, flowing in the unorganized territory of Lac-Ministuk, in the Le Fjord-du-Saguenay Regional County Municipality, in the administrative region of Saguenay–Lac-Saint-Jean, in the province of Quebec, in Canada. The course of the Bras des Angers crosses the northwest part of the Laurentides Wildlife Reserve.

The small valley of the Arm of Angers is located near route 169. This valley is served by some secondary forest roads, especially for forestry and recreational tourism activities.

Forestry is the main economic activity in this valley; recreational tourism, second.

The surface of the Bras des Angers is usually frozen from the beginning of December to the end of March, however the safe circulation on the ice is generally done from mid-December to mid-March.

== Geography ==
The main neighboring watersheds of the Bras des Angers are:

- north side: Pikauba River, Petite rivière Pikauba, Dominus stream, Sauce stream, rivière aux Écorces;
- east side: Pikauba River, Le Grand Ruisseau, Damasse stream, Petite rivière Pikauba, Cyriac River;
- south side: Pikauba River, Pika River Morin River, Gobeil stream;
- west side: Thom stream, Paul stream, lac de la Belle Rivière, Morin River.

The Angers branch rises at the confluence of two forest streams (altitude: 430 m (1,410 ft)) in a forest area in the Laurentides Wildlife Reserve. This source is located at:

- 3.8 km (2.4 mi) north-east of route 169;
- 7.3 km (4.5 mi) south-east of the confluence of the Morin river and the rivière aux Écorces;
- 5.1 km (3.2 mi) north-west of the confluence of the Bras des Angers and the Pikauba River;
- 20.5 km (12.7 mi) south of the confluence of the Pikauba river and Kenogami Lake;
- 40.3 km (25.0 mi) south-east of lac Saint-Jean.

From its source, the Angers branch flows over 5.9 km (3.7 mi) with a drop of 20 m (66 ft) entirely in the forest zone, according to the following segments:

- 1.3 km (0.81 mi) south-east, up to a stream (coming from the south-west);
- 2.5 km (1.6 mi) towards the south-east crossing a marsh area, up to a stream (coming from the south-west);
- 2.1 km (1.3 mi) towards the south-east by crossing a marsh zone, then by forming a curve towards the south, until its mouth.

The Angers arm spills out into the bottom of a small bay on the west bank of the Pikauba River. This confluence is located at:

- 0.3 km (0.19 mi) north of the confluence of the Pika and Pikauba rivers;
- 6.0 km (3.7 mi) south of the confluence of the Pikauba and Little Pikauba rivers;
- 10.5 km (6.5 mi) east of the course of the Petite rivière Pikauba;
- 23.0 km (14.3 mi) south-east of the confluence of the Pikauba river and Kenogami Lake;
- 45.6 km (28.3 mi) southwest of the confluence of the Chicoutimi River and the Saguenay River in the Chicoutimi sector of the city of Saguenay (city).

From the mouth of the Angers arm, the current successively follows the course of the Pikauba River on 34.7 km (21.6 mi) generally towards the north, crosses Kenogami Lake on 17.6 km (10.9 mi) northeasterly to barrage de Portage-des-Roches, then follows the course of the Chicoutimi River on 26.2 km (16.3 mi) eastward, then northeasterly and course of the Saguenay River on 114.6 km (71.2 mi) eastward to Tadoussac where it merges with the Saint Lawrence estuary. 0.8 km (0.50 mi)

== Toponymy ==
The toponym "bras des Angers" was formalized on December 5, 1968, at the Place Names Bank of the Commission de toponymie du Québec.

== See also ==
- Le Fjord-du-Saguenay Regional County Municipality
- Lac-Ministuk, a TNO
- Laurentides Wildlife Reserve
- Pikauba River
- Saguenay River
- List of rivers of Quebec
