= Normand River =

- Location within Quebec

Location
- Country: Canada
- Province: Quebec
- Region: Saguenay-Lac-Saint-Jean
- Regional County Municipality: Le Fjord-du-Saguenay Regional County Municipality
- Unorganized territory and a city: Lac-Ministuk

Physical characteristics
- Source: Lac Prud’homme
  - location: Lac-Ministuk
  - coordinates: 48.04351°N 71.26195°W
  - elevation: 720
- Mouth: Cyriac River
  - location: Lac-Ministuk
  - coordinates: 48.09722°N 71.24805°W
  - elevation: 480 m (1,570 ft)
- Length: 8.4 km (5.2 mi)
- Discharge
  - location: Lac-Ministuk

Basin features
- River system: Saguenay River

The Normand river is a freshwater tributary of the Cyriac River, flowing in the unorganized territory of Lac-Ministuk, in the Le Fjord-du-Saguenay Regional County Municipality, in the administrative region of Saguenay–Lac-Saint-Jean, in the province of Quebec, in Canada. The upper and intermediate course of the Normand River crosses the Laurentides Wildlife Reserve.

The Normand River is accessible by route 175; other secondary forest roads have been developed in the sector for forestry and recreational tourism activities.

Forestry is the primary economic activity in the sector; recreational tourism, second.

The surface of the Normand River is usually frozen from the end of November to the beginning of April, however the safe circulation on the ice is generally done from mid-December to the end of March.

== Geography ==
The main watersheds adjacent to the Normand River are:

- north side: Cyriac River, Simoncouche Lake, Simoncouche River, Kenogami Lake, Saguenay River;
- east side: Cyriac River, Lac des Îlets, Grimard lake, Cyriac lake, Lecompte lake, rivière du Moulin, Bras Sec;
- south side: Chavary lake, Ministuk lake, Petite rivière Pikauba, Lévesque lake, Yvette lake;
- west side: Hector stream, Richelieu lake, Petite rivière Pikauba, Minustuk lake, Cyriac lake, Pikauba River.

The Normand River has its source in Normand Lake (length: 0.9 km (0.56 mi); altitude: 602 m (1,975 ft)). The northern mouth of Lake Prud’homme is located at:

- 1.6 km (0.99 mi) southwest of Grimard Lake;
- 1.7 km (1.1 mi) north-east of a curve of the Pikauba River;
- 1.8 km (1.1 mi) north-west of Ministuk Lake;
- 6.2 km (3.9 mi) west of route 175;
- 10.4 km (6.5 mi) south of the confluence of the Normand river and the Cyriac river;
- 11.0 km (6.8 mi) south-west of Lac des Îlets.

From Normand Lake, the course of the Normand river generally flows northeast over 13.0 km (8.1 mi), with a drop of 252 m (827 ft) entirely in the forest zone, according to following segments:

- 1.1 km (0.68 mi) to the west, making a difference in level from 62 m (203 ft), to a bend in the river;
- 3.9 km (2.4 mi) north-east in a deep valley to the outlet (coming from the south-west) of lakes Villeray and Grimard;
- 3.9 km (2.4 mi) north in a deep valley, up to a bend in the river;
- 1.7 km (1.1 mi) northward passing between two mountains and bending eastward, to the outlet (coming from the east) of an unidentified lake;
- 0.8 km (0.50 mi) northwards, to a stream (coming from the west);
- 1.6 km (0.99 mi) towards the northeast by forming a loop towards the east, until its mouth.

The Normand River flows onto the southwest bank of the Cyriac River. This confluence is located at:

- 0.4 km (0.25 mi) southeast of the confluence of Hector brook and Cyriac River;
- 1.7 km (1.1 mi) southwest of route 175;
- 1.8 km (1.1 mi) southwest of Lac des Îlets;
- 8.6 km (5.3 mi) east of the confluence of the Jean-Boivin River and the Petit rivière Jean-Boivin;
- 11.7 km (7.3 mi) south-east of the confluence of the Cyriac River and Kenogami Lake;
- 13.1 km (8.1 mi) south of the barrage de Portage-des-Roches;
- 29.5 km (18.3 mi) south of the confluence of the Chicoutimi River and the Saguenay River.

From the confluence of the Normand river with the Cyriac river, the current descends the latter on 17.1 km (10.6 mi) to the north, then the current crosses Lake Kénogami on 6.3 km (3.9 mi) northeasterly to the dam of Portage-des-Roches, then follows the course of the Chicoutimi River on 26.2 km (16.3 mi) eastward, then northeasterly and the course of Saguenay River on 114.6 km (71.2 mi) eastward to Tadoussac where it merges with the Saint Lawrence estuary.

== Toponymy ==
The toponym "Normand river" was formalized on December 5, 1968, at the Place Names Bank of the Commission de toponymie du Québec.

== Appendices ==
=== Related articles ===
- Le Fjord-du-Saguenay Regional County Municipality
- Lac-Ministuk, an unorganized territory
- Laurentides Wildlife Reserve
- Cyriac River
- Kenogami Lake
- Chicoutimi River
- Saguenay River
- St. Lawrence River
- List of rivers of Quebec
