= Talbot Lake (Petite rivière Pikauba) =

Lake in Lac-Pikauba, Quebec, Canada

- Location in Quebec
- Location: Lac-Pikauba
- Coordinates: 47.85667°N 71.25139°W
- Lake type: Natural
- Primary inflows: Petite rivière Pikauba, riverside streams, and discharge from lakes including Maskwa, Decoigne, Beloeil, Lanctôt, Lalonde and Dumais.
- Primary outflows: Petite rivière Pikauba
- Basin countries: Canada
- Max. length: .0 km (0 mi)
- Max. width: 0.7 km (0.43 mi)
- Surface elevation: 757 m (2,484 ft)

Talbot Lake is a freshwater body crossed by the Petite rivière Pikauba, in the unorganized territory of Lac-Pikauba, in the Charlevoix Regional County Municipality, in the administrative region of Capitale-Nationale, Quebec, Canada. The Talbot Lake is part of the Laurentides Wildlife Reserve.

The area around the lake is served indirectly by the route 175 which passes on its west bank. Some secondary forest roads serve this area for forestry and recreational tourism activities.

Forestry is the main economic activity in the sector, with recreational tourism second.

The surface of Talbot Lake is usually frozen from the beginning of December to the end of March. However, safe circulation on the ice is generally done from mid-December to mid-March.

== Geography ==
The main watersheds near Talbot Lake are:

- north side: Tourangeau lake, Vermette stream, Cyriac River, Beaver stream;
- east side: Pikauba River, Pikauba Lake, rivière à Mars North-West, rivière à Mars;
- south side: Pies stream, Hell stream, Black stream, General-Tremblay lake, rivière aux Écorces North-East;
- west side: Leboeuf stream, Côté stream, Apica River, rivière aux Canots, Willie stream.

Talbot Lake is a widening of the Petite rivière Pikauba, a tributary of the Pikauba River. The lake's current outline is dependent on the erection of a dam at its discharge. Its southern and western shores are made of marshy soil.

Talbot Lake has a length of 7.0 km (4.3 mi), a width of 1.3 km (0.81 mi) and an altitude of 757 m (2,484 ft). This lake is mainly fed by the Petite rivière Pikauba which crosses this lake to the northeast, by riverside streams, by the outlet (coming from the southwest) from Lake Maskwa and by the outlet (coming from the northeast) of several lakes including Decoigne, Beloeil, Lanctôt, Lalonde and Dumais. This lake is surrounded by mountains on the east and south sides, whose peaks reach 900 m (3,000 ft) to the northeast and 917 m (3,009 ft) to the east. The dike at the mouth of Talbot Lake is located to the northwest, at:

- 0.2 km (0.12 mi) east of route 175;
- south-east of the confluence of the outlet of Talbot Lake and the Rivière aux Écorces North-East;
- 4.3 km (2.7 mi) south of Lac Tourangeau;
- 4.7 km (2.9 mi) north of Croche stream;
- 6.6 km (4.1 mi) north-east of the course of the Pikauba River;
- 7.0 km (4.3 mi) south-west of the Cyriac River;
- 7.0 km (4.3 mi) north-west of the junction of route 175 and route 169;
- 14.3 km (8.9 mi) south-east of the center of the ex-hamlet of Mont-Apica;
- 50.4 km (31.3 mi) south-east of the confluence of the Pikauba River and Kenogami Lake.

From the mouth of Talbot Lake, the current follows the course of:

- the Petite rivière Pikauba on 46.8 km (29.1 mi) generally towards the northeast;
- the Pikauba River on 26.5 km (16.5 mi) generally towards the north;
- the Kenogami Lake on 17.6 km (10.9 mi) towards the northeast to Barrage de Portage-des-Roches;
- the Chicoutimi River on 26.2 km (16.3 mi) to the east, then the northeast;
- the Saguenay River on 114.6 km (71.2 mi) eastward to Tadoussac where it merges with the Saint Lawrence estuary.

== Toponymy ==
The term "Talbot" is a family name of French origin.

The Quebec Geography Commission adopted the toponym "Talbot Lake" in 1949; this toponym evokes the work of life of Antonio Talbot (1900-1980). This lawyer, born in the Montmagny region, first settled in Quebec, where he practiced law after his studies at Laval University. In 1928, he lived in Saguenay, his new adopted homeland; he was deputy for Chicoutimi in Quebec from 1938 to 1965. Ardent defender of his region, Antonio Talbot as Minister of Highways, from 1944 to 1960, ensured the completion of the road connecting Quebec to Saguenay – Lac-Saint-Jean. This long-awaited road link finally makes this region more accessible, which could then only be reached through the Baie-Saint-Paul hinterland. The road was completed in 1951 and, since 1999, the section has been known as the Antonio-Talbot road.

The toponym Lac Talbot was formalized on December 5, 1968, by the Commission de toponymie du Québec.

== See also ==
- St. Lawrence River
- List of lakes in Canada
