= Simoncouche River =

Location
- Country: Canada
- Province: Quebec
- Region: Saguenay-Lac-Saint-Jean
- Regional County Municipality: Le Fjord-du-Saguenay Regional County Municipality
- Unorganized territory and a city: Lac-Ministuk and Saguenay

Physical characteristics
- Source: Forest stream
  - location: Lac-Ministuk
  - coordinates: 48°08′55″N 71°10′41″W
  - elevation: 400
- Mouth: Kenogami Lake
  - location: Saguenay
  - coordinates: 48°17′18″N 71°13′44″W
  - elevation: 164 m (538 ft)
- Length: 22.5 km (14.0 mi)
- Discharge
  - location: Saguenay

Basin features
- Tributaries
  - left: ruisseau Chaud
  - right: ruisseau des Chiens, décharge du Lac du Dépôt et du lac Hautbois (via the Simoncouche Lake)

The Rivière Simoncouche is a tributary of Kenogami Lake, flowing the unorganized territory of Lac-Ministuk (MRC Le Fjord-du-Saguenay Regional County Municipality) and in the territory of the city of Saguenay (sector Kénogami), in the administrative region of Saguenay–Lac-Saint-Jean, in the province from Quebec, to Canada. The upper part of this river begins in the northwest part of the zec Mars-Moulin and the intermediate part (Lac aux Rats Musqués area, Lac des Îlets and Simoncouche Lake) crosses the northeast part of the Laurentides Wildlife Reserve.

This small valley is served by the route 175 (boulevard Talbot) and some secondary roads for the needs of forestry, recreational tourism and residents of this area.

Forestry is the main economic activity in this valley; recreational tourism, second.

The surface of the Simoncouche River is usually frozen from the beginning of December to the end of March, however the safe circulation on the ice is generally made from mid-December to mid-March.

== Geography ==
The main neighboring watersheds of Simoncouche River are:

- north side: Kenogami Lake, Chicoutimi River, rivière aux Sables, Saguenay River;
- east side: Lac William brook, Henriette brook, Chiens brook, Bras Henriette, Bras de Jacob Ouest, rivière du Moulin;
- south side: Cyriac River, Valiquette lake, Cyriac lake, Bras Sec.
- west side: Cyriac River, Normand River, Hector brook, Chicoutimi River.

The Simoncouche River originates from a forest stream (altitude: 400 m (1,300 ft)). This source is located at:

- 0.9 km (0.56 mi) north-east of the forest road R0215;
- 3.6 km (2.2 mi) north-east of a curve of the Cyriac River;
- 4.5 km (2.8 mi) north-east of route 175;
- 15.9 km (9.9 mi) south-east of the confluence of the Simoncouche river and Kenogami Lake;
- 32.5 km (20.2 mi) south of the confluence of the Chicoutimi River and the Saguenay River.

From its source, the Simoncouche River flows over 22.5 km (14.0 mi) with a drop of 236 m (774 ft) especially in the forest zone, according to the following segments:

- 3.2 km (2.0 mi) first towards the north-east, then branching towards the north-west notably by crossing the Muscat Rats Lake (length: 0.6 km (0.37 mi); altitude: 376 km (234 mi)) to its mouth;
- 6.3 km (3.9 mi) towards the northwest in particular by crossing Lac des Îlets (length: 2.7 km (1.7 mi); altitude: 353 m (1,158 ft)) at its full length to its mouth. Note: this lake has a T-shaped island;
- 5.1 km (3.2 mi) towards the northwest in particular by crossing Simoncouche Lake (length: 3.2 km (2.0 mi); altitude: 339 m (1,112 ft));
- 3.5 km (2.2 mi) to the west by crossing route 175, then following it on the west side, forming a hook towards the west, until a bridge on this last road;
- 1.9 km (1.2 mi) north-east, up to the Chiens stream (coming from the south-east) draining Grand lac des Mouches and Petit lac des Mouches;
- 1.1 km (0.68 mi) to the northwest by crossing route 175, up to Chaud stream;
- 1.4 km (0.87 mi) north-west, to its mouth.

The Simoncouche River flows into the bottom of Moncouche Bay (length: 0.5 km (0.31 mi)) on the south shore of Kenogami Lake, at the entrance to Villa Marie Bay, in the sector of Kénogami, in the city of Saguenay. The name Moncouche is often used to designate the neighboring bay, Villa Marie bay, at the bottom of which rises the Moncouche dike, a regulating structure for the waters of the lake. Behind the dyke is Petit Lac Moncouche. The confluence of the Simoncouche River is located at:

- 1.3 km (0.81 mi) north-west of route 175;
- 2.6 km (1.6 mi) south of the barrage de Portage-des-Roches;
- 10.3 km (6.4 mi) south-west of Lac-Kénogami village;
- 19.5 km (12.1 mi) south-west of the confluence of the Chicoutimi River and the Saguenay River.

From the confluence of the Simoncouche river with the Kenogami Lake, the current crosses this lake for 3.2 km (2.0 mi) towards the northeast until the barrage de Portage-des-Roches, then follows the course of the Chicoutimi River on 26.2 km (16.3 mi) to the east, then the northeast and the course of the Saguenay River on 114.6 km (71.2 mi) eastwards to Tadoussac where it merges with the Saint Lawrence estuary.

== Simoncouche Teaching and Research Forest (FERS) ==
20 minutes from downtown Chicoutimi, at kilometer 217 of the Laurentides Wildlife Reserve, the University of Quebec at Chicoutimi (UQAC) operates the Simoncouche Teaching and Research Forest (FERS) over an area of 27 square kilometers. The FERS was created by the Minister of Forests to promote practical education and applied research in forestry. This mission was entrusted to the University of Quebec at Chicoutimi which already used in 1981 the facilities of the Ministry of Recreation, Hunting and Fishing.

The FERS has several trails connecting the eight lakes in its territory, the most important of which are Lac des Îlets (170 ha), Simoncouche (87 ha) and du Dépôt (21 ha). The main tree species are poplar, birch, fir and spruce forests. The main species of fish are brook trout and white sucker.

The FERS administers various forest management works and research activities take place throughout the territory: development of degraded forests, monitoring of the biodiversity of the territory, evaluation of the degradation of natural camping sites, impact of climate change on tree growth.

The main buildings on the site include: the main chalet (six bedrooms upstairs, two meeting rooms and kitchen on the ground floor); research pavilion, boathouse, chalet at Lac du Dépôt, Simoncouche beach, tent platforms in Simoncouche, Lac du Dépôt and Lac des Îlets, as well as several wilderness areas.

== Toponymy ==
The toponym "Simoncouche River" was formalized on December 5, 1968, at the Place Names Bank of the Commission de toponymie du Québec.

== See also ==
- Le Fjord-du-Saguenay Regional County Municipality
- Lac-Ministuk, an unorganized territory
- Saguenay, a city
- Saguenay River
- Chicoutimi River
- Kenogami Lake
- Simoncouche Lake
- List of rivers of Quebec
