= Lac Kénogami, Quebec =

Lac Kénogami may refer to several places:

- Kenogami Lake, a lake in the Saguenay–Lac-Saint-Jean region of Quebec
- Lac-Kénogami, Quebec, a former municipality near the lake, which is now part of the city of Saguenay, Quebec
