= Gilbert River =

Gilbert River may refer to:

- Gilbert River (Queensland), a river in northern Australia
- Gilbert River, Queensland, a rural locality in northern Australia
- Gilbert River (South Australia), Australia
- Gilbert River (Labrador), Canada; see List of rivers of Newfoundland and Labrador
- Gilbert River (Cyriac River), Canada
- Gilbert River (Beauce-Sartigan), Quebec, Canada; see List of rivers of Quebec
- Gilbert River (Oregon), United States
