= Simoncouche Lake =

Lake in Quebec, Canada

- Location within Quebec
- Location: Saguenay / Lac-Ministuk, Saguenay–Lac-Saint-Jean, Quebec
- Coordinates: 48.23111°N 71.25083°W
- Type: Naturel
- Primary inflows: Simoncouche River
- Primary outflows: Simoncouche River
- Basin countries: Canada
- Max. length: 3.2 km (2.0 mi)
- Max. width: 0.5 km (0.31 mi)
- Surface area: 57 km^{2} (22 sq mi)
- Shore length^{1}: catchment
- Surface elevation: 339 m (1,112 ft)
- ^{1} Shore length is not a well-defined measure.

The Simoncouche Lake is a fresh body of water crossed by the Simoncouche River on the watershed of the Saguenay River. The Simoncouche Lake straddles the unorganized territory of Lac-Ministuk, and that of the city of Saguenay, in the administrative region of Saguenay–Lac-Saint-Jean, in the province of Quebec, in Canada.

Lac Simoncouche is located in the northwestern part of the Laurentides Wildlife Reserve, as well as in the Simoncouche teaching and research forest (FERS) of the Université du Québec à Chicoutimi. The FERS covers an area of 27 square kilometers. A rest area has been built near the Québec-Chicoutimi road, allowing you to appreciate the wilderness of the site.

This small valley is served by the route 170 (boulevard Talbot) and some secondary roads for the needs of forestry, recreational tourism activities.

Forestry is the main economic activity in the sector; recreational tourism, second.

The surface of Lake Simoncouche is usually frozen from the beginning of December to the end of March, however the safe circulation on the ice is generally made from mid-December to mid-March.

== Geography ==
The main watersheds near Lake Simoncouche are:

- north side: Kenogami Lake, Chicoutimi River, rivière-aux-Sables, Saguenay River;
- east side: Lac William brook, Henriette brook, Chiens brook, Bras Henriette, Bras de Jacob Ouest, rivière du Moulin;
- south side: lac des Îlets, Cyriac River, Valiquette lake, Cyriac lake, Bras Sec.
- west side: Cyriac River, Normand River, Hector brook, Chicoutimi River.

The Lake Simoncouche has a length of 3.2 km (2.0 mi), a width of 0.5 km (0.31 mi) and an altitude of 339 m (1,112 ft). This lake is made in length by a widening of the Simoncouche River which crosses it towards the north; this lake has three parts formed by two narrowing. This lake is located in the Laurentides Wildlife Reserve in the massif of Laurentian Mountains.

This lake is mainly fed by the Simoncouche River (coming from the south) and by the outlet (coming from the east) from Lac du Dépôt and Lac Hautbois. The mouth of this lake is located at:

- 0.3 km (0.19 mi) east of route 175;
- 0.4 km (0.25 mi) south-east of Barrière-de-Laterrière;
- 2.3 km (1.4 mi) north-east of a curve in the course of the Cyriac River;
- 5.1 km (3.2 mi) south of the confluence of the Simoncouche River and Kenogami Lake;
- 4.5 km (2.8 mi) west of the course of Bras de Jacob Ouest;
- 10.9 km (6.8 mi) south-west of the course of the rivière du Moulin.

From the mouth of Lake Simoncouche, the current follows the course of the Simoncouche River consecutively over 7.9 km (4.9 mi) north to the confluence with Kenogami Lake; it crosses this lake for 3.2 km (2.0 mi) north-east to Portage-des-Roches dam; it follows the course of the Chicoutimi River on 26.2 km (16.3 mi) to the east, then the northeast and the course of the Saguenay River on 114.6 km (71.2 mi) east to Tadoussac where it merges with the Saint Lawrence estuary.

== Toponymy ==
The name "Lac Simoncouche" appeared in the Dictionary of Rivers and Lakes of the Province of Quebec in 1914, when the river was called "Moncouche". These two toponymic names seem popular, as much for the river as the bay; the most commonly used designations have been formalized.

The name Moncouche comes from Muakush, an Amerindian word meaning sea eagle. The origin of the first syllable "si" is unknown as is its meaning.

The toponym Lac Simoncouche was formalized on December 5, 1968, by the Commission de toponymie du Québec.

== See also ==
- Le Fjord-du-Saguenay Regional County Municipality
- Lac-Ministuk, an unorganized territory
- Saguenay, a city
- Saguenay River
- Chicoutimi River
- Kenogami Lake
- Simoncouche River
- List of lakes in Canada
