= Petite rivière Pikauba =

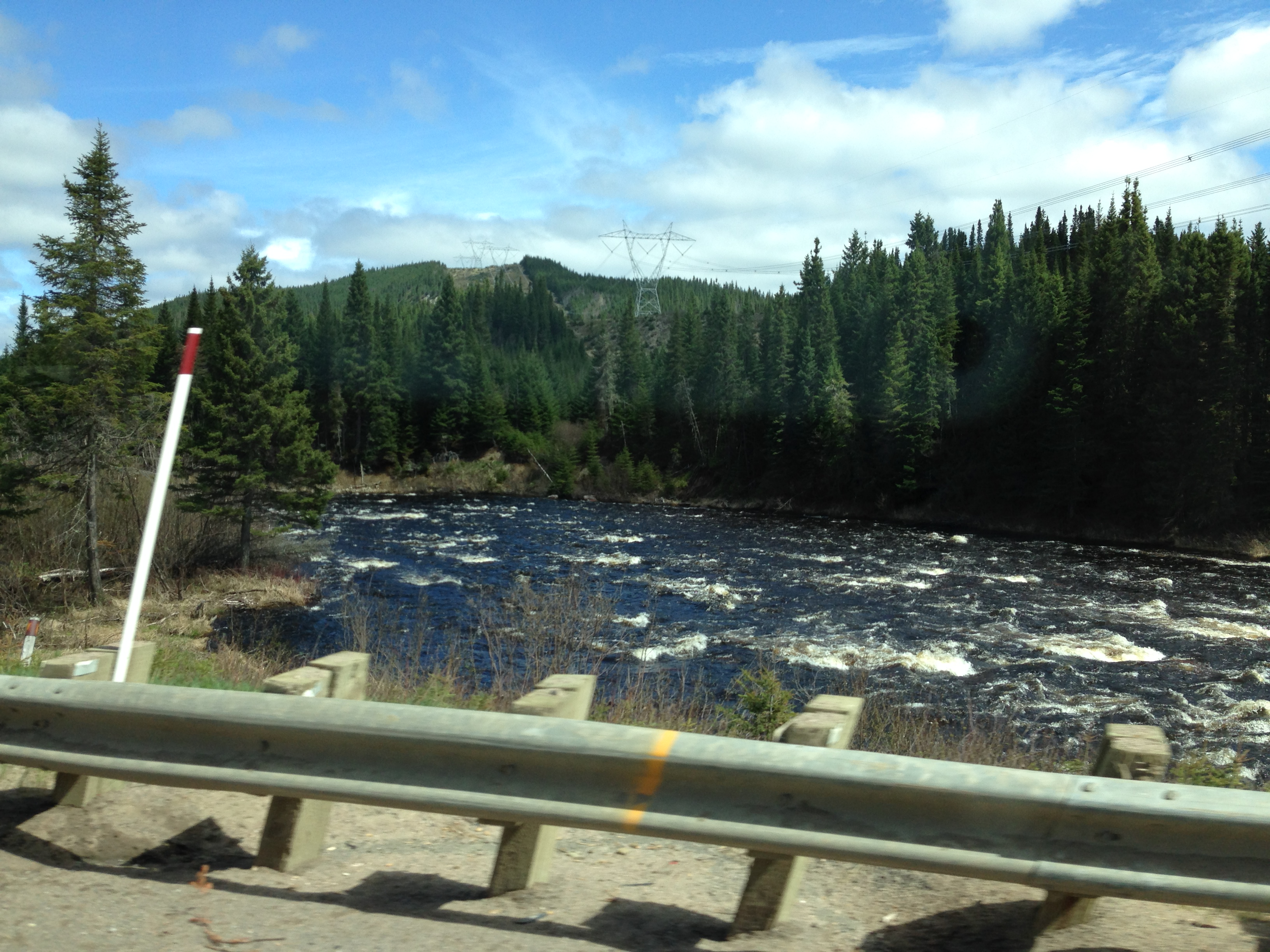

Location
- Country: Canada
- Province: Quebec
- Region: Saguenay-Lac-Saint-Jean
- Regional County Municipality: Le Fjord-du-Saguenay Regional County Municipality
- Unorganized territory and a city: Lac-Pikauba and Saguenay

Physical characteristics
- Source: Lac Desjardins
  - location: Lac-Pikauba
  - coordinates: 47.865315°N 71.13759°W
  - elevation: 928
- Mouth: Pikauba River
  - location: Lac-Ministuk
  - coordinates: 48.32472°N 71.44083°W
  - elevation: 348 m (1,142 ft)
- Length: 74.1 km (46.0 mi)
- Discharge
  - location: Lac-Ministuk

Basin features
- Tributaries
  - left: (from the mouth) Ruisseau non identifié, décharge d'un lac non identifié, Le Grand Ruisseau, décharge d'un lac non identifié, décharge d'un lac non identifié, ruisseau non identifié, décharge du lac de l'Ondée, ruisseau Jean-Baptiste, décharge des lacs Malouin et Pruneau, décharge (via le lac Talbot) des lacs Minier et Dean, décharge du lac Maskwa (via le lac Talbot), décharge du lac Vermeil (via le lac Talbot); Amont du lac Talbot: décharge des lacs Fortier et Decoigne.
  - right: (from the mouth) Décharge du lac Arsenault, décharge des lacs Paul et Albert, ruisseau In, décharge d'un ruisseau non identifié, ruisseau non identifié, décharge du lac Tourangeau; Amont du lac Talbot: ruisseau non identifié, décharge du lac Fitou, décharge du lac Blacburn (via le lac Lanctôt).

The Petite Rivière Pikauba is a tributary of the Pikauba River, flowing in the province of Quebec, in Canada, in the administrative regions of:

- Capitale-Nationale: in the unorganized territory of Lac-Pikauba, in the Charlevoix Regional County Municipality;
- Saguenay–Lac-Saint-Jean: in the unorganized territory of Lac-Ministuk, in the Le Fjord-du-Saguenay Regional County Municipality.

The Petite rivière Pikauba flows entirely into the Laurentides Wildlife Reserve. The valley of the Petite rivière Pikauba is mainly accessible thanks to the route 169 and the route 175 (connecting Quebec and Chicoutimi). Other secondary forest roads have been developed in the sector for the needs of forestry and recreational tourism activities.

Forestry developed in the sector at the end of the 19th century, thus generating the development of hunting and fishing activities.

The surface of the Petite rivière Pikauba is usually frozen from the end of November to the beginning of April, however the safe circulation on the ice is generally made from mid-December to the end of March.

== Geography ==
The Petite Rivière Pikauba rises at the mouth of Lac Desjardins. This lake is located in the central part of the Laurentides Wildlife Reserve. This lake has a length of 0.5 km (0.31 mi), an altitude is 928 m (3,045 ft). The mouth of Lac Desjardins is located at:

- 2.2 km (1.4 mi) west of the course of the Cyriac River;
- 2.4 km (1.5 mi) north-west of Pikauba Lake;
- 7.4 km (4.6 mi) south-east of the course of the Pikauba River;
- 9.6 km (6.0 mi) south-east of the junction of roads route 175 and route 169;
- 41.6 km (25.8 mi) south-east of the confluence of the small Pikauba river and the Kenogami Lake.

From the mouth of Lac Desjardins, the Petite rivière Pikauba flows over 74.1 km (46.0 mi), with a drop of 580 m (1,900 ft), according to the following segments:

Upper course of the Petite rivière Pikauba (segment of 37.3 km (23.2 mi))

- 2.2 km (1.4 mi) to the south, then crossing Lake Lanctôt (length: 1.2 km (0.75 mi); altitude: 847 km (526 mi)) west on its full length, to its mouth;
- 2.5 km (1.6 mi) to the west, then crossing Lake Lanctôt (length: 1.6 km (0.99 mi); altitude: 842 m (2,762 ft)) south on 0.6 km (0.37 mi), to its mouth;
- 3.3 km (2.1 mi) south-west to Petit lac Beloeil, then south-east in particular by crossing Lake Beloeil (length: 1.6 km (0.99 mi); altitude: 823 m (2,700 ft)) over its full length;
- 1.6 km (0.99 mi) to the southwest, up to a bend in the river, corresponding to the outlet (coming from the southeast) from Lac Fortier and Lac Decoigne;
- 4.6 km (2.9 mi) towards the northwest by collecting the outlet (coming from the north) from Lake Fitou, up to the outlet (coming from the north) from Lake Dumais;
- 5.6 km (3.5 mi) first towards the southwest, then crossing a bay and the northern part of Talbot Lake (length: 7.5 km (4.7 mi); altitude: 757 m (2,484 ft)) on 4.7 km (2.9 mi), to its mouth;

Intermediate course of the Petite rivière Pikauba (segment of 19.4 km (12.1 mi))

- 5.7 km (3.5 mi) to the northwest in a deep valley crossing the route 175, to the outlet of Lac Tourangeau (coming from the east);
- 6.3 km (3.9 mi) towards the north-west in a deep valley by winding up to a stream (coming from the south);
- 7.4 km (4.6 mi) towards the northwest by winding in a deep valley to the Jean-Baptiste stream (coming from the southwest);

Lower course of the Petite rivière Pikauba (segment of 27.4 km (17.0 mi))

- 3.0 km (1.9 mi) northwesterly, to In stream (coming from the east) which drains Lac Lévesque;
- 7.1 km (4.4 mi) north-west to the outlet (coming from the south-west) of Lake Ondée;
- 2.8 km (1.7 mi) north-west, to the outlet (coming from the east) of lakes Albert and Paul;
- 8.5 km (5.3 mi) towards the northwest by forming four loops towards the northeast, up to Le Grand Ruisseau (coming from the southeast);
- 5.9 km (3.7 mi) towards the northwest crossing several rapids, to its mouth.

The Little Pikauba River flows into a bay on the south shore of Kenogami Lake, 1.0 km (0.62 mi) west of Pointe Finnigan which is attached to the south shore of the lake. This confluence of the small Pikauba River is located at:

- 5.5 km (3.4 mi) south-west of the course of the Jean-Boivin River;
- 6.9 km (4.3 mi) south-east of a curve of the course of the Rivière aux Écorces;
- 9.2 km (5.7 mi) north-east of route 169;
- 15.9 km (9.9 mi) south-west of route 175;
- 16.5 km (10.3 mi) south of Kenogami Lake;
- 23.7 km (14.7 mi) south-west of the barrage de Portage-des-Roches;
- 40.2 km (25.0 mi) south-west of the confluence of the Chicoutimi River and the Saguenay River.

From the confluence of the Little Pikauba river and the Pikauba River the current successively follows the course of the latter on 26.5 km (16.5 mi) towards the north, crosses the Kenogami Lake on 17.6 km (10.9 mi) north-east to barrage de Portage-des-Roches, then follow the course of the Chicoutimi River on 26.2 km (16.3 mi) to the east, then the northeast and the course of the Saguenay River on 114.6 km (71.2 mi) east to Tadoussac where it merges with the Saint Lawrence estuary.

== Toponymy ==
The toponym "Petite rivière Pikauba" was formalized on January 8, 1981, at the Place Names Bank of the Commission de toponymie du Québec.

== Appendices ==
=== Related articles ===
- Charlevoix Regional County Municipality
- Le Fjord-du-Saguenay Regional County Municipality
- Laurentides Wildlife Reserve
- Lac-Pikauba, a TNO
- Lac-Ministuk, a TNO
- Talbot Lake, a body of water
- Saguenay River, a stream
- Chicoutimi River, a stream
- Kenogami River, a body of water
- Pikauba River, a stream
- List of rivers of Quebec
