= Bras Sec =

River in Quebec, Canada

- Location within Quebec

Location
- Country: Canada
- Province: Quebec
- Region: Saguenay-Lac-Saint-Jean
- Regional County Municipality: Le Fjord-du-Saguenay Regional County Municipality
- Unorganized territory: Lac-Ministuk

Physical characteristics
- Source: Lac Catelier
  - location: Lac-Ministuk
  - coordinates: 48.049974°N 71.16199°W
  - elevation: 671 m (2,201 ft)
- Mouth: rivière du Moulin
  - location: Lac-Ministuk
  - coordinates: 48.11694°N 71.06139°W
  - elevation: 330 m (1,080 ft)
- Length: 26.2 km (16.3 mi)
- Discharge
  - location: Saguenay

Basin features
- Tributaries
  - left: (from the mouth) Discharge of Le Grand Lac, lac à la Tripe and lac Vénus.

The bras Sec (English: Dry Arm) is a tributary of the rivière du Moulin, flowing in the unorganized territory of Lac-Ministuk, in the Le Fjord-du-Saguenay Regional County Municipality, in the administrative region of Saguenay–Lac-Saint-Jean, in the province of Quebec, in Canada. The course of the Sec arm crosses the northwest part of the zec Mars-Moulin.

The small valley of the Bras Sec is served by a few secondary forest roads, especially for forestry and recreational tourism activities.

Forestry is the main economic activity in this valley; recreational tourism, second.

The surface of the Dry arm is usually frozen from the beginning of December to the end of March, however the safe circulation on the ice is generally done from mid-December to mid-March.

== Geography ==
The main watersheds neighboring the Sec arm are:

- north side: Lac Vénus, Grand Lac, Lac des Éclats, rivière du Moulin;
- east side: Lac Coupau, rivière du Moulin, Bras de l'Enfer, rivière à Mars;
- south side: rivière du Moulin, Cyriac River, Pikauba River, Savane stream, Vermette stream;
- west side: Cyriac River, Normand River, Savane stream.

Le Bras Sec rises at the mouth of Lake Catellier (length: 0.5 km (0.31 mi); altitude: 671 m (2,201 ft)) in a forest area in the zec Mars-Moulin. This landlocked lake between the mountains is located at the southwestern limit of the zec Mars-Moulin, that is to say:

- 2.4 km (1.5 mi) north of the forest road R0287;
- 2.7 km (1.7 mi) west of the course of the rivière du Moulin;
- 4.3 km (2.7 mi) north-east of the course of the Cyriac River;
- 5.3 km (3.3 mi) north-east of a curve on route 175;
- 10.6 km (6.6 mi) south-west of the confluence of Bras Sec and rivière du Moulin;
- 11.2 km (7.0 mi) north-east of the course of the Pikauba River.

From Lac Catellier, the Bras Sec flows over 26.2 km (16.3 mi) with a drop of 341 m (1,119 ft) entirely in the forest zone, according to the following segments:

Upper course of the Bras Sec (segment of 18.1 km (11.2 mi))

- 1.3 km (0.81 mi) to the north, bending slightly to the east to go around a mountain, to a stream (coming from the west);
- 5.8 km (3.6 mi) making a difference in height from 180 m (590 ft) first to a bend in the river, then bending towards the northeast, to a stream (coming from the South);
- 3.0 km (1.9 mi) north-west passing west of a mountain and past a forest camp, to a stream (coming from the west);
- 6.8 km (4.2 mi) towards the north by making a detour towards the west to go around a mountain whose summit reaches 450 m (1,480 ft), up to a bend of the river, corresponding to a stream (coming from the south);
- 1.2 km (0.75 mi) north, to a stream (coming from the west);

Lower course of the Bras Se (segment of 8.1 km (5.0 mi))

- 0.8 km (0.50 mi) eastward, to the outlet (coming from the north) of Le Grand Lac, lac à la Tripe and lac Vénus;
- 3.4 km (2.1 mi) south-east, until a discharge (coming from the south-west) from a stream;
- 3.9 km (2.4 mi) towards the south-east by collecting two streams, to its mouth.

The Sec arm flows into a bend in the west bank of the rivière du Moulin, near (west side) of Coupau lake. This confluence is located at:

- 5.5 km (3.4 mi) west of the course of the rivière à Mars;
- 13.0 km (8.1 mi) east of the Cyriac River;
- 13.1 km (8.1 mi) north-east of route 175;
- 14.1 km (8.8 mi) north of the boundary of the administrative regions of Saguenay–Lac-Saint-Jean (MRC Le Fjord-du-Saguenay Regional County Municipality and Capitale-Nationale (MRC Charlevoix Regional County Municipality);
- 34.9 km (21.7 mi) south-east of the confluence of the rivière du Moulin and the Saguenay River in the sector Chicoutimi of the city of Saguenay.

From the mouth of the Sec arm, the current successively follows the course of the rivière du Moulin on 52.7 km (32.7 mi) generally north, then the course from the Saguenay River on 126.1 km (78.4 mi) eastwards to Tadoussac where it merges with the Saint Lawrence Estuary.

== Toponymy ==
The term "Sec" (English: Dry) refers to the fact that in certain periods of drought, this stream is almost dry.

The toponym "bras Sec" was formalized on June 29, 1983, at the Place Names Bank of the Commission de toponymie du Québec.

== See also ==
- Le Fjord-du-Saguenay Regional County Municipality
- Lac-Ministuk, a TNO
- Zec Mars-Moulin, a ZEC
- Rivière du Moulin
- Saguenay River
- List of rivers of Quebec
