= Cyriac River =

- Location within Quebec

Location
- Country: Canada
- Province: Quebec
- Region: Saguenay-Lac-Saint-Jean
- Regional County Municipality: Le Fjord-du-Saguenay Regional County Municipality
- Unorganized territory and a city: Lac-Pikauba and Saguenay

Physical characteristics
- Source: Pikauba Lake
  - location: Lac-Pikauba
  - coordinates: 47.85276°N 71.11149°W
  - elevation: 400
- Mouth: Kenogami Lake
  - location: Saguenay
  - coordinates: 48.30139°N 71.29361°W
  - elevation: 164 m (538 ft)
- Length: 57.2 km (35.5 mi)
- Discharge
  - location: Saguenay

Basin features
- Tributaries
  - left: (from the mouth) Décharge du lac Gilbert, Jean Boivin River, ruisseau, décharge du lac Vaneau, ruisseau, ruisseau, ruisseau, ruisseau, décharge du lac Lecours, décharge des lacs Faniant, Nixon et du Quai, Gilbert River, décharge du lac Demaux, décharge du lac Watcho.
  - right: (from the mouth) Décharge d'un lac non identifié, décharge du lac à Théophile et du lac Henri, décharge du lac Oyé, ruisseau de la Savane, ruisseau Vermette, décharge du lac Sims, ruisseau aux Castors, ruisseau au Foin, ruisseau, décharge du lac Charest, décharge du lac Bijou, décharge du lac Beauchesne.

The Rivière Cyriac (also The Cyriac) is a freshwater tributary feeding the Kenogami Lake, flowing in:

- Capitale-Nationale: in the unorganized territory of Lac-Pikauba, in the MRC of Charlevoix Regional County Municipality;
- Saguenay-Lac-Saint-Jean: in the unorganized territory of Lac-Ministuk, in the Le Fjord-du-Saguenay Regional County Municipality.

The Cyriac River crosses the Laurentides Wildlife Reserve. The Cyriac river valley is directly served by the route 175; other secondary forest roads have been developed in the sector for forestry and recreational tourism activities.

Forestry is the primary economic activity in the sector; recreational tourism, second.

The surface of the Cyriac River is usually frozen from the end of November to the beginning of April, however the safe circulation on the ice is generally done from mid-December to the end of March.

== Geography ==
The main watersheds near the Cyriac river are:

- north side: Kenogami Lake, Jean-Guy stream, rivière aux Sables, Saguenay River;
- east side: Simoncouche River, Simoncouche Lake, Bras Sec, rivière du Moulin, Bras de Jacob;
- south side: Pikauba River, Pikauba Lake, Verchères lake, Philippe stream, Jacques-Cartier River;
- west side: Ministuk lake, Gilbert River, Pikauba River.

The Cyriac river rises at Lake Pikauba (length: 12.2 km (7.6 mi); width: 1.9 km (1.2 mi); altitude: 827 km (514 mi)). Enclosed between the mountains, this lake has two outlets: the Cyriac river (north side) and the Pikauba river (southeast side where a dam has been built). The north mouth of Pikauba Lake is located at:

- 6.4 km (4.0 mi) north of the second mouth of the lake;
- 10.7 km (6.6 mi) north-east of route 175;
- 17.9 km (11.1 mi) south-east of the upper course of the Petite rivière Pikauba;
- 51.8 km (32.2 mi) south-east of the confluence of the Cyriac River and Kenogami Lake.

From Pikauba Lake, the course of the Cyriac river generally flows northwest over 57.2 km (35.5 mi), with a drop of 663 m (2,175 ft) entirely in the forest zone, according to following segments:

Upper course of the Cyriac river (segment of 23.0 km (14.3 mi))

- 5.8 km (3.6 mi) towards the northwest by forming a loop towards the east at the beginning of the segment, up to the outlet (coming from the north) of Lac Paquin;
- 10.9 km (6.8 mi) meandering northwest, crossing Lake Muy (altitude: 781 km (485 mi)) and collecting the hay stream discharge (coming from the north-east), up to Beaver Creek (coming from the north);
- 8.1 km (5.0 mi) to the northwest by collecting the outlet (coming from the northeast) from Lake Sims, to Vermette stream (coming from the east);
- 14.9 km (9.3 mi) along route 175, first towards the northwest, then north and northwest, and crossing the forest road R0287, up to the confluence of the river Gilbert (from the south);

Lower course of the Cyriac river (segment of 34.2 km (21.3 mi))

- 5.2 km (3.2 mi) north to the outlet of a group of lakes including Petit lac Cyriac;
- 9.1 km (5.7 mi) towards the north, zigzagging at the start of the segment and along the last 2.6 km (1.6 mi) the forest road R0215, to the bridge of the route 175;
- 2.8 km (1.7 mi) westwards, to the confluence of the Normand River (coming from the south);
- 11.5 km (7.1 mi) towards the northwest by collecting the Hector stream at the beginning of the segment, by forming a hook toward the northeast and along the west side of the city limit of Saguenay (city) at the end of the segment, up to the confluence of the Jean-Boivin River (coming from the west);
- 5.6 km (3.5 mi) to the north in a deep valley, along the western side of the city limit of Saguenay (city), to its mouth.

The Cyriac river flows on the south shore of Lake Kénogami, facing Île Verte and facing Baie Voisine de l'Île à Jean-Guy. This confluence is located at:

- 4.9 km (3.0 mi) west of the confluence of the Simoncouche River and Kenogami Lake;
- 5.4 km (3.4 mi) north-west of route 175;
- 6.1 km (3.8 mi) south-west of the barrage de Portage-des-Roches;
- 12.9 km (8.0 mi) south of downtown Jonquière sector of Saguenay (city);
- 16.2 km (10.1 mi) south of the confluence of rivière-aux-Sables and Saguenay River;
- 21.7 km (13.5 mi) south-west of the confluence of the Chicoutimi and Saguenay rivers.

From the confluence of the Cyriac river with Kenogami Lake, the current crosses this lake for 6.3 km (3.9 mi) northeast to the dam of Portage-des-Roches, then follows the course of the Chicoutimi river on 26.2 km (16.3 mi) to the east, then the northeast and the course of the Saguenay river on 114.6 km (71.2 mi) east to Tadoussac where it merges with the Saint Lawrence estuary.

== Toponymy ==
The name of the river was given in honor of Cyriac Buckell, German settler and trapper, installed on the banks, facing the mouth of this river at the time of the colonization of the territory. He was, moreover, the first settler to settle there.

The toponym "Cyriac River" was formalized on December 5, 1968, at the Place Names Bank of the Commission de toponymie du Québec.

== Appendices ==
=== Related articles ===
- Le Fjord-du-Saguenay Regional County Municipality
- Laurentides Wildlife Reserve
- Jean-Boivin River
- Gilbert River
- Kenogami Lake
- Chicoutimi River
- Saguenay River
- St. Lawrence River
- List of rivers of Quebec
