= Pikauba River =

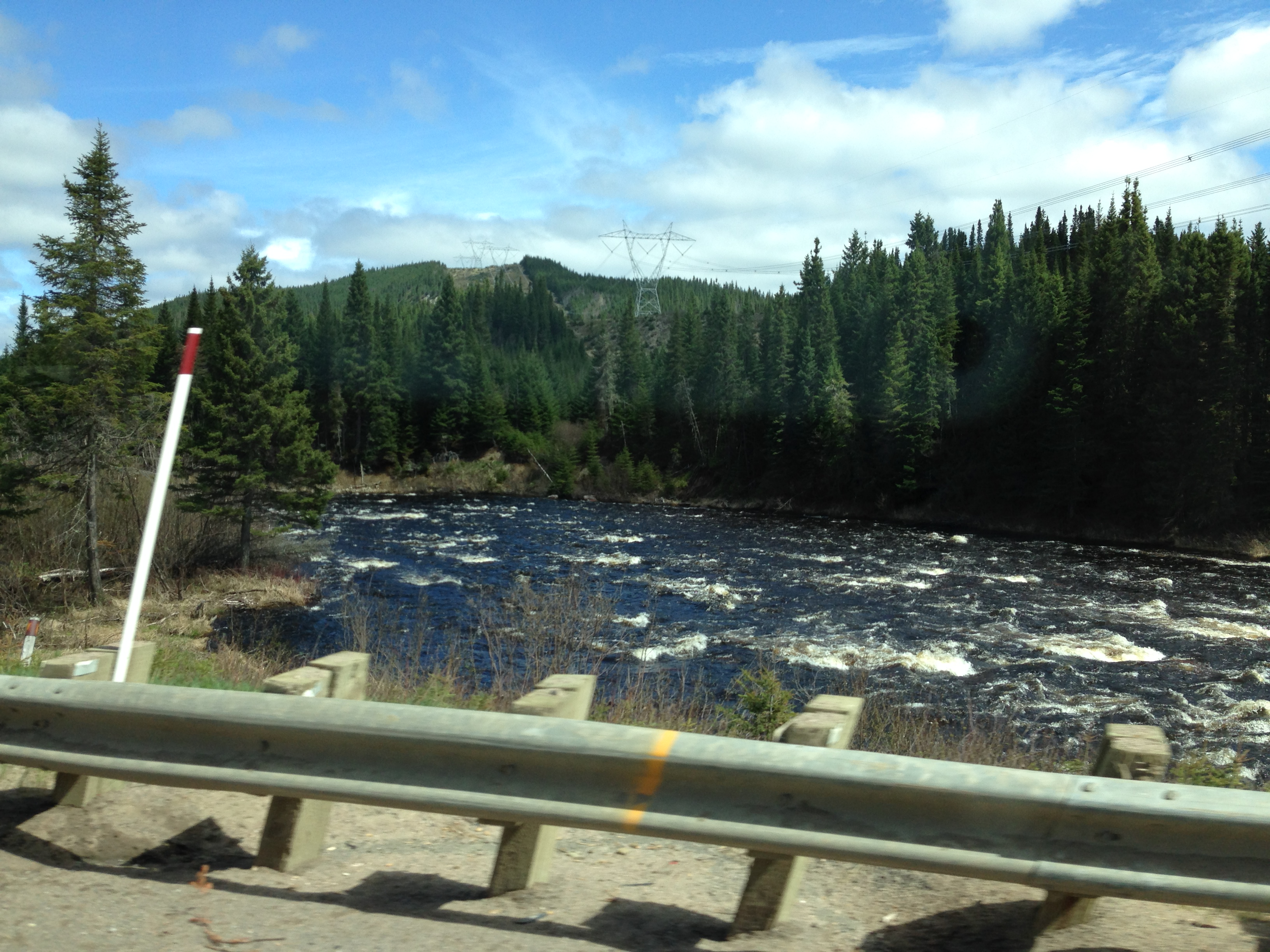

- Location within Quebec
- Native name: Grande rivière Pikauba; Rivière Chicoutimi

Location
- Country: Canada
- Province: Quebec
- Region: Saguenay-Lac-Saint-Jean
- Regional County Municipality: Le Fjord-du-Saguenay Regional County Municipality
- Unorganized territory and a city: Lac-Pikauba and Saguenay

Physical characteristics
- Source: Pikauba Lake
  - location: Lac-Pikauba
  - coordinates: 47°47′58″N 71°08′45″W
  - elevation: 867
- Mouth: Kenogami Lake
  - location: Saguenay
  - coordinates: 48°19′30″N 71°26′28″W
  - elevation: 164 m (538 ft)
- Length: 138.8 km (86.2 mi)
- Discharge
  - location: Saguenay

Basin features
- Tributaries
  - left: (from the mouth) ruisseau, décharge des lacs de la Vieille, Long et à Daniel, ruisseau L'Abbé, rivière aux Écorces, décharge du lac de la Boussole, décharge du lac Sable, ruisseau à la Sauce, ruisseau Dominus, ruisseau, décharge du lac Harley, bras des Angers, rivière Pika, ruisseau, ruisseau, décharge du lac Suzor-Côté, décharge du lac Scylla et du lac Charybde, rivière Apica, décharge du lac Mathias, décharge du lac Nekaw, ruisseau Côté, ruisseau, ruisseau Dicto, ruisseau Noir, ruisseau des Pies, décharge du lac des tétards, décharge du lac Argencour, ruisseau Philippe.
  - right: (from the mouth) décharge du Petit lac Clair, ruisseau des Gagnon, ruisseau, décharges des lacs Caconar, ruisseau de la Blaque, ruisseau, décharge des lacs Lebeau et Vivier, Petite rivière Pikauba, décharge du lac Belvèdère, ruisseau Damasse, ruisseau Félix, ruisseau Tremblay, ruisseau Ovide, décharge du lac De Gonzague, décharge du lac Grelon et Meanwell, décharge d'un lac non identifié, décharge du lac Davenport, décharge du lac de la Grosse Truite, décharge du lac Bellemare, décharge du lac Langlois, décharge des lacs Jupiter, Violon et du Général-Tremblay.

The Pikauba River is a tributary of Kenogami Lake, flowing in the province of Quebec in Canada, in the administrative regions of:

- Capitale-Nationale: in the unorganized territory of Lac-Pikauba, in the Charlevoix Regional County Municipality;
- Saguenay-Lac-Saint-Jean: in the unorganized territory of Lac-Ministuk, in the Le Fjord-du-Saguenay Regional County Municipality.

This river crosses the Laurentides Wildlife Reserve. The Pikauba River Valley is mainly accessible via the route 169 and the route 175 (connecting Quebec (city) and Chicoutimi). Other secondary forest roads have been developed in the area for forestry and recreational tourism activities.

The Pikauba River and Pikauba Lake have enjoyed a considerable reputation among hunters and fishermen since the end of the 19th century. Throughout the region, trout abounded and caribou hunting was once very popular.

The surface of the Pikauba River is usually frozen from late November to early April, however safe circulation on the ice is generally from mid-December to late March.

== Geography ==
The Pikauba River is one of the most important rivers between Quebec (city) and Saguenay (city). Bordered by steep mountains, its narrow course is dotted with rapids and has several falls; it widens downstream, rich in the waters of its drainage basin which includes the Apica, Écorces, Pika and Petite Pikauba rivers. Increasingly tumultuous, it flows into the western part of Kenogami Lake.

The Pikauba River originates at the dike at the southeast mouth of Pikauba Lake which has another outlet, the Cyriac River; this other mouth is located at the bottom of a bay on the north shore. This lake is located in the central part of the Laurentides Wildlife Reserve. This lake has a length of 10.2 km (6.3 mi), a maximum width of 1.9 km (1.2 mi), an altitude is 827 m (2,713 ft) and an area of . This lake has a narrowing generating a strait of a hundred meters in width demarcating the northern part of the lake. The mouth of the south-east of the lake flowing into the Pikauba river is located at:

- 5.9 km (3.7 mi) north-east of route 175 connecting the towns of Quebec (city) and Saguenay (city);
- 8.6 km (5.3 mi) south-east of the junction of roads route 175 and route 169;
- 38.2 km (23.7 mi) south-west of the dam at the mouth of Lake Ha! Ha!;
- 57.0 km (35.4 mi) south-east of the Portage-des-Roches dam located at the mouth of Kenogami Lake;
- 62.5 km (38.8 mi) south-east of the confluence of the Pikauba river and Kenogami Lake;
- 70.3 km (43.7 mi) south-east of the confluence of the Chicoutimi River and the Saguenay River, that is to the downtown of Saguenay (city).

From the southeast mouth of Pikauba Lake, the Pikauba River flows over 138.8 km (86.2 mi), with a drop of 677 m (2,221 ft), according to the following segments:

Upper course of the Pikauba river (segment of 37.6 km (23.4 mi))

- 8.1 km (5.0 mi) south-west to the outlet (coming from the south) of lakes Jupiter, Violon and Général Tremblay, corresponding to a bend of the river located near route 175;
- 11.3 km (7.0 mi) towards the south-east along the route 175, up to Philippe stream (coming from the northeast);
- 5.7 km (3.5 mi) south along route 175, passing under the bridge of this last route, to a bend in the river;
- 6.9 km (4.3 mi) towards the north-west in a deep valley, until the stream of Hell (coming from the south);
- 5.6 km (3.5 mi) towards the northwest by collecting the Pies stream (coming from the south), to the Black stream (coming from the west);

Intermediate course of the Pikauba river, downstream from the ruisseau Noir (segment of 39.6 km (24.6 mi))

- 9.4 km (5.8 mi) north-west, then north, to the outlet of Davenport Lake;
- 5.9 km (3.7 mi) towards the northwest by meandering, until the Croche stream (coming from the east);
- 2.6 km (1.6 mi) westward, to Leboeuf stream (coming from the south);
- 7.6 km (4.7 mi) towards the north-west, more or less along route 169, to the Ovide stream (coming from the northeast);
- 9.1 km (5.7 mi) towards the northwest by meandering, up to Tremblay stream (coming from the southeast);
- 5.0 km (3.1 mi) north-west to a bend in the river, then west along the Félix stream, to the confluence of the Apica River (coming from South);

Intermediate course of the Pikauba river, downstream of the Apica river (segment of 35.1 km (21.8 mi))

- 8.2 km (5.1 mi) towards the northwest in a deep valley forming a small hook towards the east at the end of the segment, up to Damasse stream (coming from the east);
- 18.4 km (11.4 mi) towards the northwest by winding up to the Pika River (coming from the south);
- 8.5 km (5.3 mi) to the north, taking the Angers arm up to the confluence of the Petite Pikauba River (coming from the east);

Lower course of the Pikauba river (segment of 26.5 km (16.5 mi))

- 9.1 km (5.7 mi) towards the north by collecting the Dominus stream (coming from the west) at the start of the segment, then by collecting the Sauce stream (coming from the southwest), up to the stream at La Joke (coming from the northeast) whose confluence is located downstream from a bend in the river;
- 6.8 km (4.2 mi) north-west until the confluence of the Rivière aux Écorces (coming from the south);
- 2.2 km (1.4 mi) towards the northwest, up to ruisseau L'Abbé (coming from the southeast);
- 5.1 km (3.2 mi) towards the northeast by forming a W at the end of the segment, up to the Gagnon stream (coming from the southeast);
- 3.3 km (2.1 mi) towards the northwest, bending towards the northeast by going around a mountain, to its mouth.

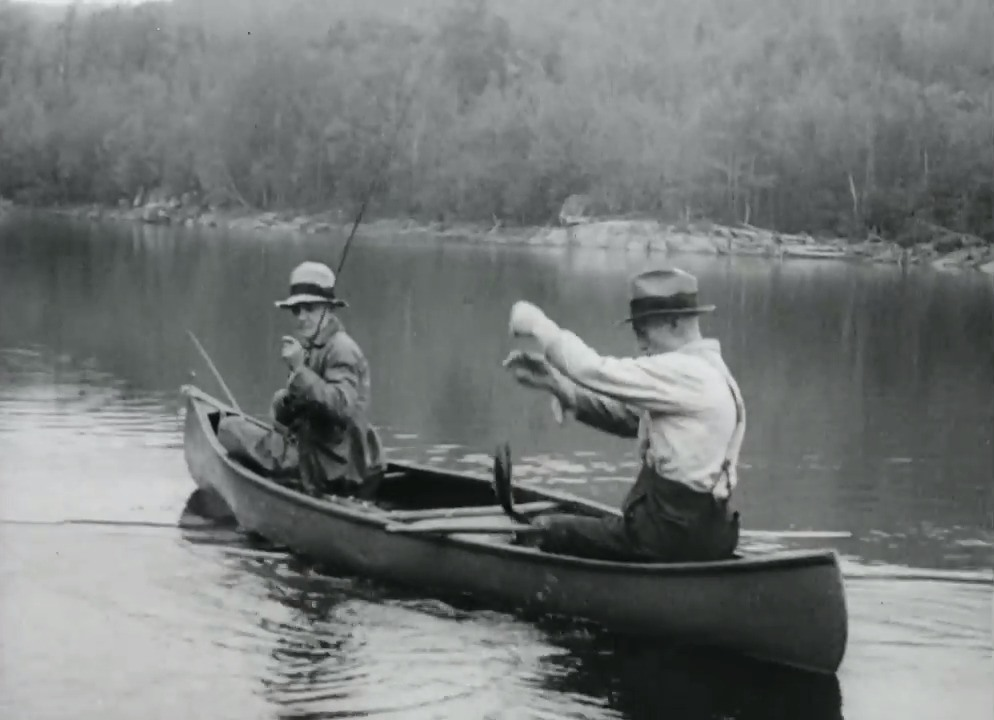

The Pikauba River flows into a bay on the south shore of Kenogami Lake, 1.0 km (0.62 mi) west of Pointe Finnigan which is attached to the south shore of the lake. This confluence of the Pikauba river is located at:

- 5.0 km (3.1 mi) west of the entrance to Épiphane Bay which is on the north shore of the lake;
- 11.3 km (7.0 mi) west of the confluence of the Cyriac River and Kenogami Lake;
- 16.2 km (10.1 mi) west of route 175;
- 17.1 km (10.6 mi) south-west of the Portage-des-Roches dam;
- 17.1 km (10.6 mi) southwest of downtown in the Jonquière sector of the city of Saguenay (city);
- 19.4 km (12.1 mi) south-west of the confluence of the rivière aux Sables and Saguenay River;
- 29.5 km (18.3 mi) south-west of the confluence of the Chicoutimi River and the Saguenay River.

From the confluence of the Pikauba river with the Kenogami Lake, the current crosses this lake for 17.6 km (10.9 mi) towards the northeast until the dam of Portage-des-Roches, then follows the course of the Chicoutimi River on 26.2 km (16.3 mi) to the east, then the northeast and the course of the Saguenay River on 114.6 km (71.2 mi) eastwards to Tadoussac where it merges with the Saint Lawrence estuary.

== Toponymy ==
The specific "Pikauba" designates two rivers and a lake in the "Laurentian wildlife reserve". Father Laure's 1731 map identifies this watercourse "Ouapikoupau river". According to Father Joseph-Étienne Guinard, in the Innu and Cree languages in particular, there is the "pikobaw" form that Father Laure translates from the Innu language as "tightened or masked by rushes". Another source claims rather that "pikobaw" breaks down into "pik", meaning "menu", "kobaw" meaning "scrub" and "wabi" meaning "white"; thus, this translation generates “white brush” or “small brush”.

In 1981, the Commission de toponymie du Québec adopted a change in the designation of this watercourse. Maps from 1900 to 1930 refer to the hydronyms "Grande Rivière Pikauba" and Petite Rivière Pikauba. The place names "Chicoutimi" and "Pikauba" officially replaced them in 1940. More recently, usage has confirmed that the part of the river south of Kenogami Lake is called "Pikauba river" and its tributary, that of “Petite rivière Pikauba”.

The toponym "Pikauba river" was formalized on January 8, 1981, at the Place Names Bank of the Commission de toponymie du Québec.

== Appendices ==
=== Related articles ===
- Charlevoix Regional County Municipality
- Le Fjord-du-Saguenay Regional County Municipality
- Lac-Pikauba, a TNO
- Lac-Ministuk, a TNO
- Saguenay River, a stream
- Chicoutimi River, a stream
- Pikauba Lake, a body of water
- Kenogami Lake, a body of water
- Rivière aux Écorces, a watercourse
- Pika River, a stream
- Apica River, a stream
- Little Pikauba River, a stream
- List of rivers of Quebec
