= Kenogami Lake =

Kenogami lake
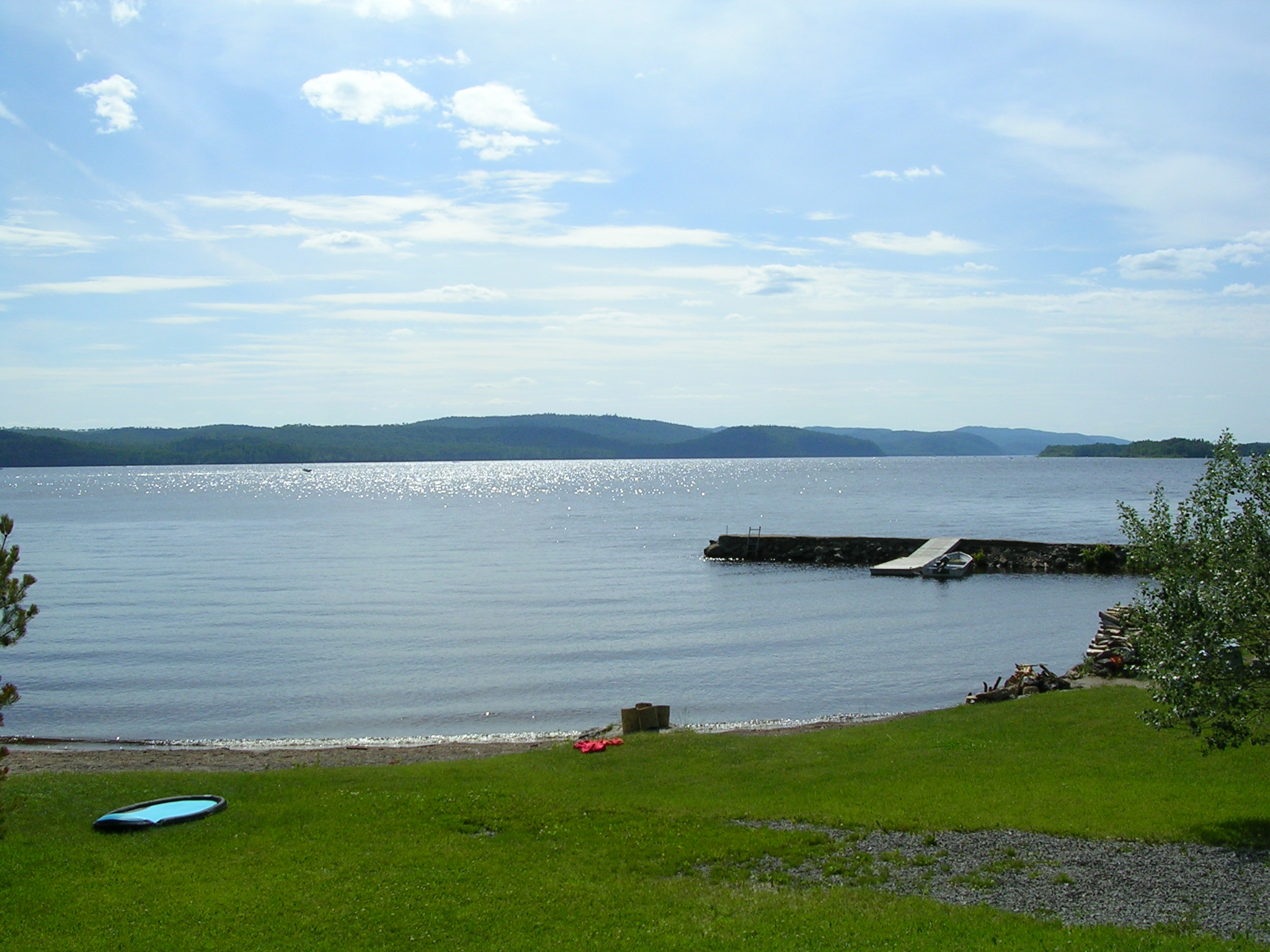

- Location within Quebec Location within Canada
- Location: Saguenay / Lac-Ministuk / Larouche / Hébertville, Saguenay–Lac-Saint-Jean, Quebec
- Coordinates: 48°19′36″N 71°22′34″W
- Type: Dam lake
- Primary inflows: South shore: rivière Simoncouche rivière Cyriac décharge du lac Gilles ruisseau McDonald ruisseau Patrie rivière Pikauba décharge des Lac de la Petite Pêche; North Shore (Cascouia Bay): décharge du lac Charnois décharge du lac Lésigny décharge du lac Leclerc décharge du lac Culotte décharge du lac Décène ruisseau du Pont Flottant; North Shore: décharge du lac Central, du lac à Booyi et du lac Houle décharge du lac Alphonse et du lac Emma décharge du lac à Jean décharge du lac à Pierre-Guby; Petite rivière aux Sables ruisseau Jean-Dechène décharge du lac Warren décharge du lac de la Ligne
- Primary outflows: Chicoutimi River and Rivière-aux-Sables
- Basin countries: Canada
- Max. length: 27.24 km (16.93 mi)
- Max. width: 6.87 km (4.27 mi)
- Surface area: 57 km^{2} (22 sq mi)
- Max. depth: 102 m (335 ft)
- Shore length^{1}: catchment
- Surface elevation: 150 m (490 ft)
- Settlements: Lac-Kénogami, Hébertville
- ^{1} Shore length is not a well-defined measure.

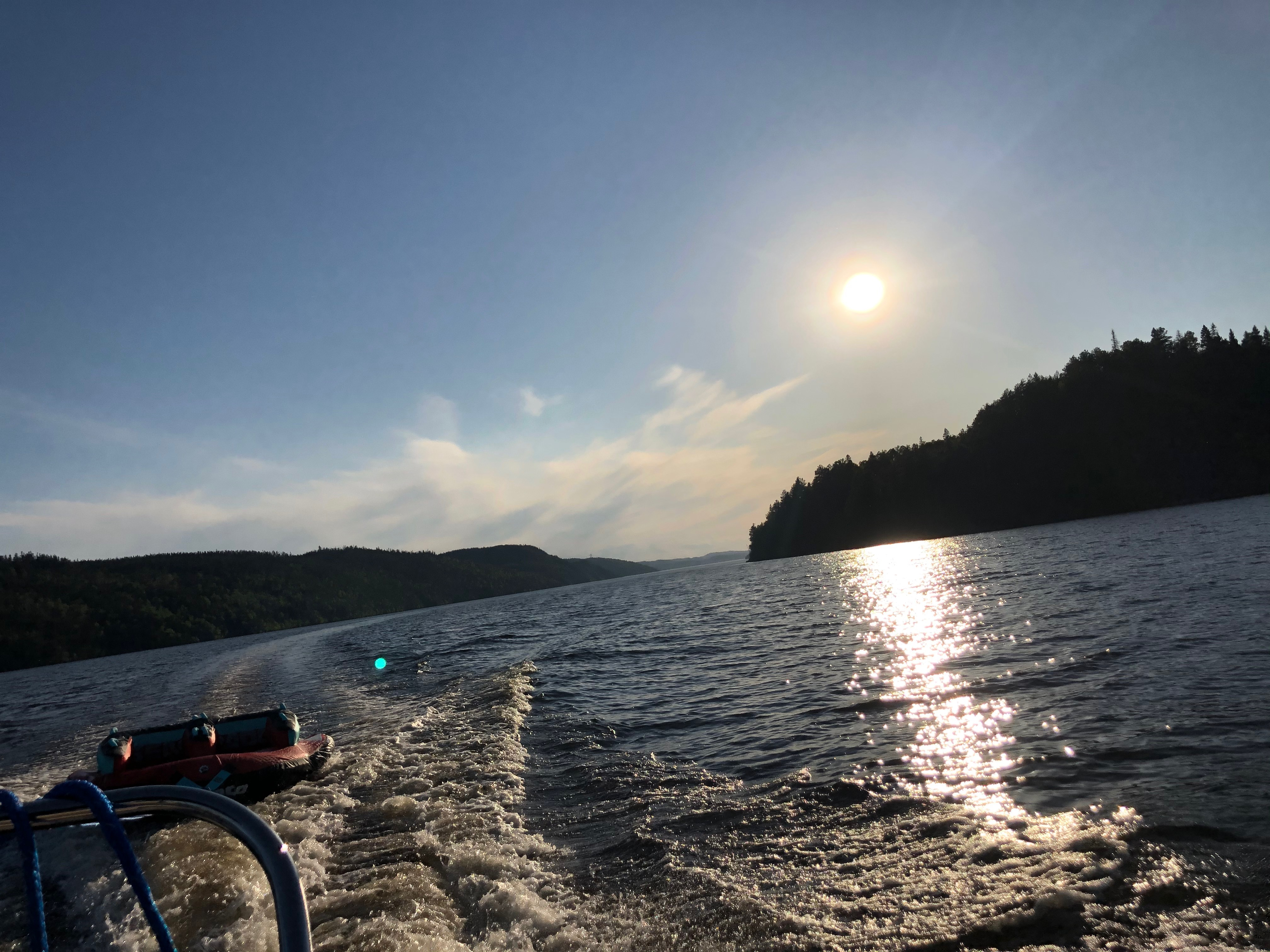
Couché de soleil sur le Lac Kénogami

Kenogami lake is a long lake in the Saguenay–Lac-Saint-Jean region of south-central Quebec, Canada. Situated at an altitude of 150 m (490 ft), the lake is 27 km (17 mi) long and 11 to 102 m (36 to 335 ft) deep. "Kénogami" means "long lake" in the Montagnais dialect and was originally used to refer to Kenogami Lake, Ontario.

It is situated in the Laurentian Highlands 150 km (93 mi) north of the Saint Lawrence River, into which it drains via the Saguenay River through the Chicoutimi and Aux-Sables Rivers.

The lake is fed by dozens of small rivers coming from the Laurentian Highlands. The three principal being the Pikauba, Cyriac and Aux-Ecorces Rivers. The towns on its shores include Lac-Kénogami, and Hébertville.

The area around the lake is served on the east side by route 175 (boulevard Talbot); on the north side by the Kénogami road, the Route des Bâtisseurs and the Saint-Dominique street in Jonquière. A few secondary roads have been built in the area for the needs of hydroelectricity, forestry, recreational tourism and residents of this area (especially the northern part of the lake).

Hydroelectricity is the main economic activity in this sector; recreational tourism activities, second; forestry, third.

The surface of Lake Kénogami is usually frozen from the beginning of December to the end of March, however the safe circulation on the ice is generally made from mid-December to mid-March.

== Geography ==
Having for main hydrographic basin the Laurentides Wildlife Reserve (by rivers Pikauba, Cyriac and aux Écorces), this body of water, with an area of 59.1 km (36.72 mi) and a volume of 380 million m3 of water, is the source of the rivers Chicoutimi and Aux Sables.

On its shores are the municipalities of Hébertville, Larouche and the former municipalities of Laterrière and Lac-Kénogami now part of the city of Saguenay.

The reservoir waters are retained by the dams Portage-des-Roches, Pibrac-Est and Pibrac-Ouest as well as the Ouiqui, Baie- dikes Cascouia, Moncouche, Coulée-Gagnon, Creek Outlet (1, 2 and 3) and Pibrac (East and West).

This lake has two outlets:

- Chicoutimi River (east side) whose entrance is bounded by the barrage de Portage-des-Roches;
- rivière aux Sables (north side) whose entrance is bounded by the Pibrac West dam.

The main characteristics (bays, points, islands) around the lake are (clockwise from the outlet Chicoutimi River):

South Shore

- Villa Marie bay,
- Moncouche bay (outlet of the Simoncouche River),
- the Pier-à-Chabot,
- Pointe aux Bouleaux,
- McDonald tip,
- McDonald Bay (receiving the McDonald Creek outlet),
- Cabland du Chaland bay,
- Finnigan point,
- Pointe du Caribou,

North Shore

- point Raphaël,
- points to Harvey,
- Epiphanes bay,
- Dufour bay,
- bay at Cadie,
- Pointe aux Sables,
- bay Gélinas,
- Chouinard Bay,
- Théophile bay

Épiphane Bay and Cascouia Bay

- bay at Simon's,
- Pointe de Sable,
- Camp lake,
- Clover Bay,
- bay to Richard,
- Lac à Jean bay
- Saint-Édouard Island,
- Dufour bay,
- Gagné bay,
- notch of the Curé,

Around Jean-Guy Island

- Green Island,
- Neighbor Bay,
- green island,
- Voisine Island.

Main buildings around the lake

- Saint-Cyriac Chapel
- Price retirees center

From the barrage de Portage-des-Roches, corresponding to the mouth of Lake Kénogami, the current follows the course of the Chicoutimi River on 26.2 km (16.3 mi) towards the east, then the northeast and the course of the Saguenay River on 114.6 km (71.2 mi) eastward to Tadoussac where it merges with the Saint Lawrence estuary.

== Toponymy ==
The toponym "Lac Kénogami" was formalized on December 5, 1968 at the Bank of Place Names of the Commission de toponymie du Québec.
