= Chicoutimi River =

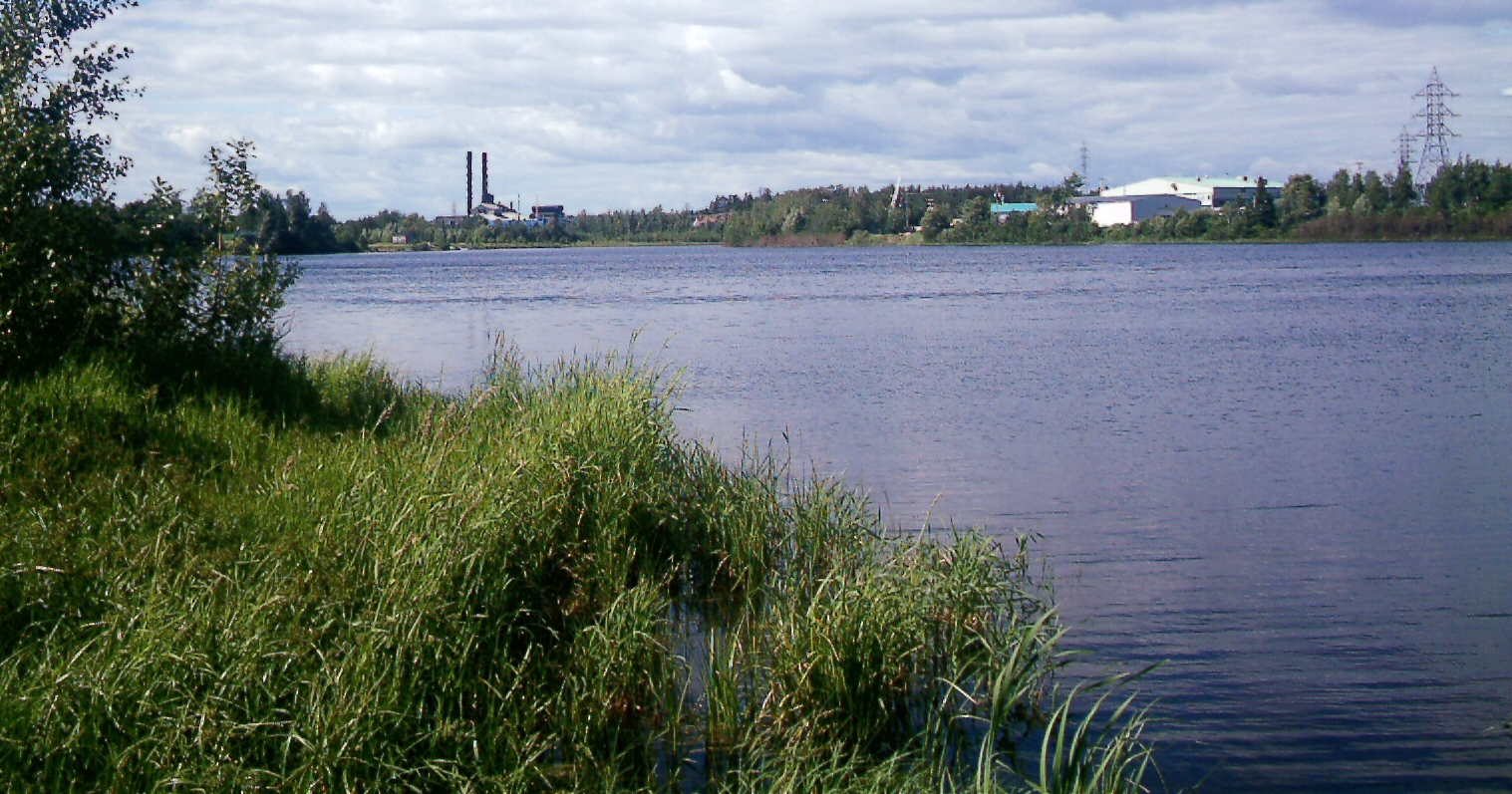

- Location within Quebec

Location
- Country: Canada
- Province: Quebec
- Region: Saguenay-Lac-Saint-Jean
- Regional County Municipality: Le Fjord-du-Saguenay Regional County Municipality
- City: Saguenay

Physical characteristics
- Source: Kenogami Lake via Barrage de Portage-des-Roches
  - location: Saguenay
  - coordinates: 48°18′35″N 71°12′42″W
  - elevation: 164
- Mouth: Saguenay River
  - location: Saguenay
  - coordinates: 48°25′48″N 71°04′30″W
  - elevation: 87 m (285 ft)
- Length: 26.2 km (16.3 mi)
- Discharge
  - location: Saguenay

Basin features
- Tributaries
  - left: (from the mouth) Cours d'eau Morin, cours d'eau Brassard, cours d'eau Bédard, cours d'eau Belley, décharge du lac Dallaire.
  - right: (from the mouth) Ruisseau Gilbert, ruisseau Henriette, décharge du lac Clairval, du lac de la Cave et du Petit lac Moncouche.

The Chicoutimi River is a watercourse of eastern Quebec, Canada. A tributary of the Saguenay River, which it meets in the city of Saguenay, it is the 26.2-kilometre-long (16.3 mi) main outlet of Kenogami Lake, which rises from a watershed of 3,390 square kilometres (1,310 sq mi) in the Laurentides Wildlife Reserve. Entirely located in the Chicoutimi borough of Saguenay, it is the most urbanized and dammed river in Saguenay–Lac-Saint-Jean.

Used by the Montagnais of the Saguenay River before the arrival of Europeans, it was at that time the first portage from the main access road to Lac Saint-Jean. In the 20th century, it was developed from its source to its mouth for hydropower purposes. In addition to being the source of drinking water for the Chicoutimi and Jonquière boroughs, this river has six dams (including 2 hydroelectric power plants in operation). During the Saguenay flood in 1996, its surge caused significant damage to Laterrière and Chicoutimi.

== Geography ==
=== Course and hydrogeology ===
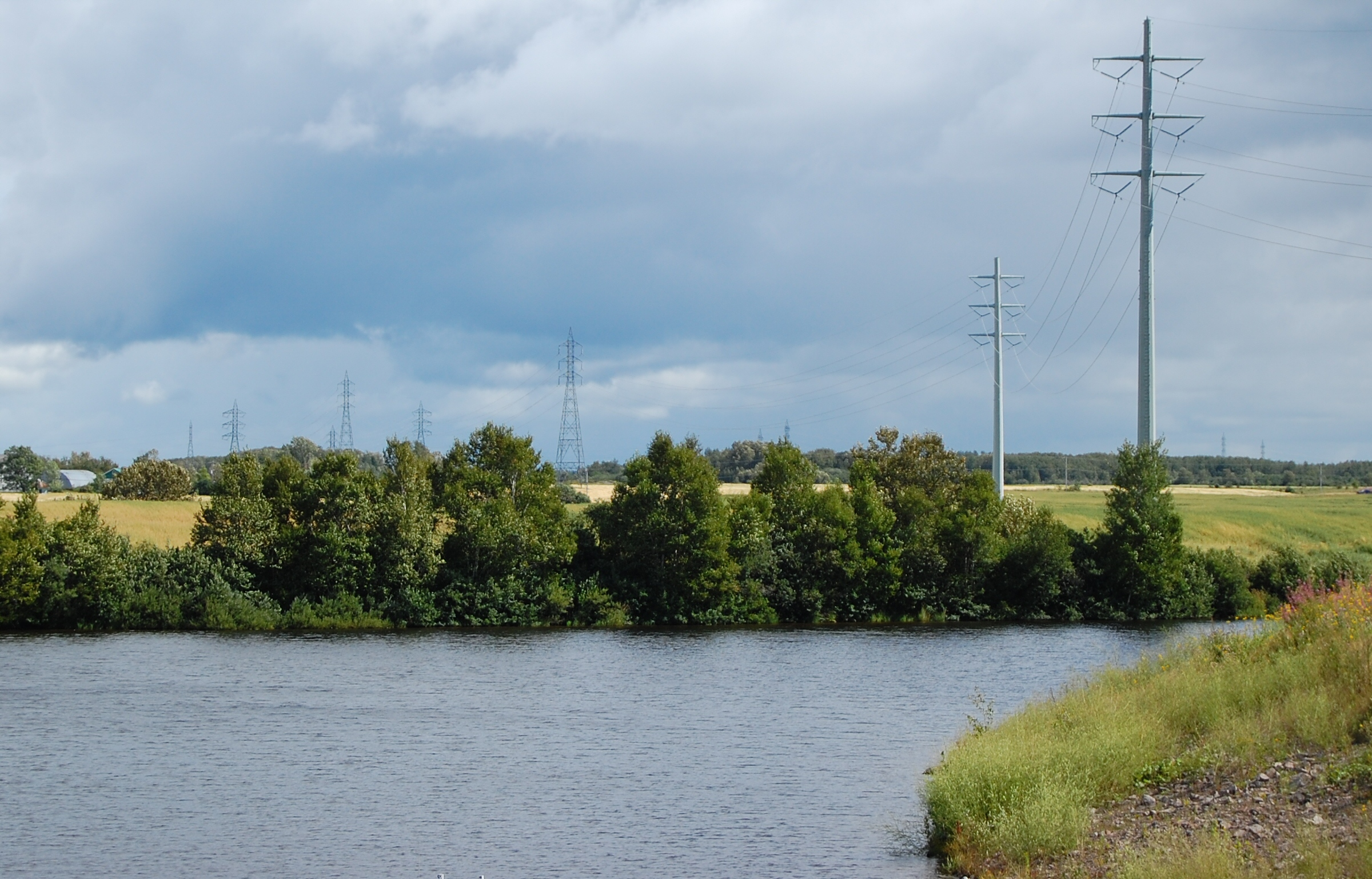
The Chicoutimi River crossing agricultural land shortly before the Chute-Garneau

Location of the course of the Chicoutimi River in the borough Chicoutimi

The Chicoutimi River rises at Portage-des-Roches, in the Laterrière sector of the Chicoutimi borough at 150 m (490 ft) altitude and flows northeast towards Laterrière-Bassin where it is spanned by the Père-Honorat bridge. Leaving the rocky base and the steep relief of Portage-de-Roches, it then enters an alluvial and semi-alluvial plain up to dam de la Chute-Garneau where the landscapes on both banks alternate between residences and agricultural land for a little over ten kilometers.

The Chute-Garneau dam is a watercourse retaining structure located on a rock base. Half a kilometer further on, route 170 crosses the river which then enters a more urbanized sector of the Chicoutimi borough. After having bypassed Pointe du Chien, it passes under Autoroute 70 and enters the Haut-Saguenay industrial park. The river then crosses the Pont-Arnaud dam and begins its increasingly rapid descent towards the Saguenay as the relief becomes increasingly steep. After passing under the Ulric Blackburn bridge (boulevard Barette) it flows into Lac Dubuc; the reservoir of the Chute-Blanchette dam. This retaining structure dries up the original rock bed of the river to divert it towards an underground water intake which supplies the S.P.C. ( Elkem Métal). The river then re-emerges in the historic site of the Pulperie de Chicoutimi and continues to descend to the Chicoutimi dam basin. Finally, it flows into the Saguenay River.

The Chicoutimi River flows mainly in the Saguenay graben, a vast elevated valley that overlooks the lowlands surrounding the Saguenay River. The soils of this large depression are composed of Quaternary marine sediments, such as silt and clay, deposited at the end of the Pleistocene and during the beginning of the Holocene by the Laflamme Sea. During the last three kilometers when approaching the Saguenay river, opposite the landscape of the alluvial plain of Laterière, the river is encased in a series of gullies in which it sinks to 70 m (230 ft). The composition of the soils and the strong acceleration of the runoff caused by unevenness in this sector are the main causes causing the river to cut, through marine clay, an incision from 10 to 20 m (66 ft) until the parent rock giving it the appearance of a torrent.

=== Hydrography ===
The watershed of the Chicoutimi River occupies an area of 3,390 km^{2} (1,310 sq mi), distributed mainly in the Laurentian Wildlife Reserve and shared between two administrative regions: Saguenay–Lac-Saint-Jean and Capitale-Nationale. The basin territory includes sections of 6 unorganized territories, the municipality in four MRCs.

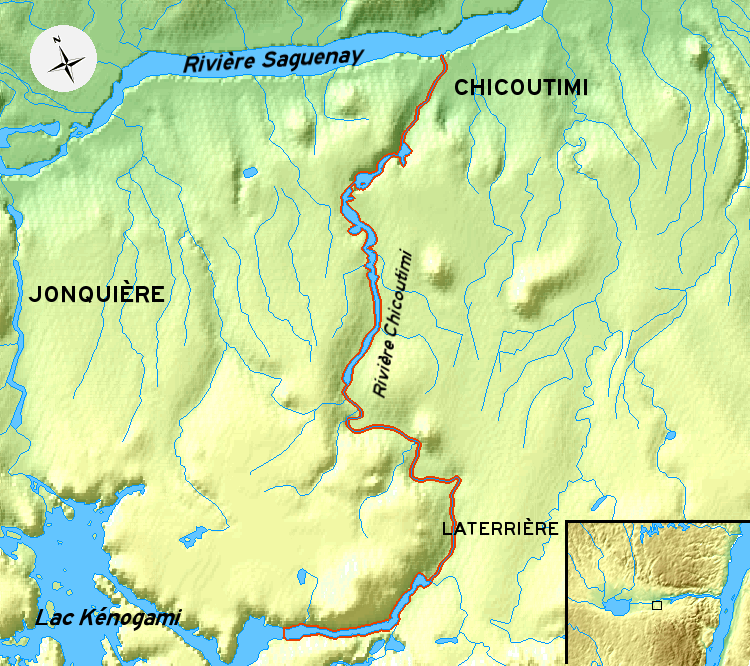
Map of the Chicoutmi River

Flowing from south to north, the Chicoutimi River rises east of Kenogami Lake via the Portage-des-Roches dam in the old town from Laterrière (today Chicoutimi borough to Saguenay (city)). This river is artificially controlled over 26.2 km (16.3 mi) in distance and 150 m (490 ft) in elevation for a century.

The first section, delimited by the dams of Portage-des-Roches and Pont-Arnaud, would represent a part in upstream of the river almost 20 km (12 mi) in length. Located in the plain of Laterrière, south of Chicoutimi, this section would have a drop of barely 17.3 m (57 ft) and would form a meander and a reservoir retained by the dams of Pont-Arnaud and Chute-Garneau.

Downstream from Pont-Arnaud, the second section has a drop of 132.7 m (435 ft) for about 5 km (3.1 mi) of distance. The Chute-Blanchette (Elkem Métal) and Chicoutimi (Abitibi-Consolidated) dams were built respectively on falls of 84.1 and 21.3 m (276 and 70 ft) and largely explain this steep descent to the Saguenay. The erosion of the river, barely visible upstream, becomes very apparent downstream because it has been dug, over time, in the granite of fjord, a small valley up to Saguenay River. The river is influenced by the tide only downstream of the Chicoutimi dam where it forms a basin.

=== Watershed ===
==== Official designation of the basin ====
First, it is important to specify that the Chicoutimi river watershed includes that of Kenogami Lake since the Letellier judgment in 1911. This judgment designated the Chicoutimi River as the main outlet for the lake to the detriment of the Rivière aux Sables. The daily contributions of spills from Kenogami Lake into these rivers according to the following proportions: 2/3 go to the Chicoutimi river and 1/3 to the Sables river.

==== General description ====
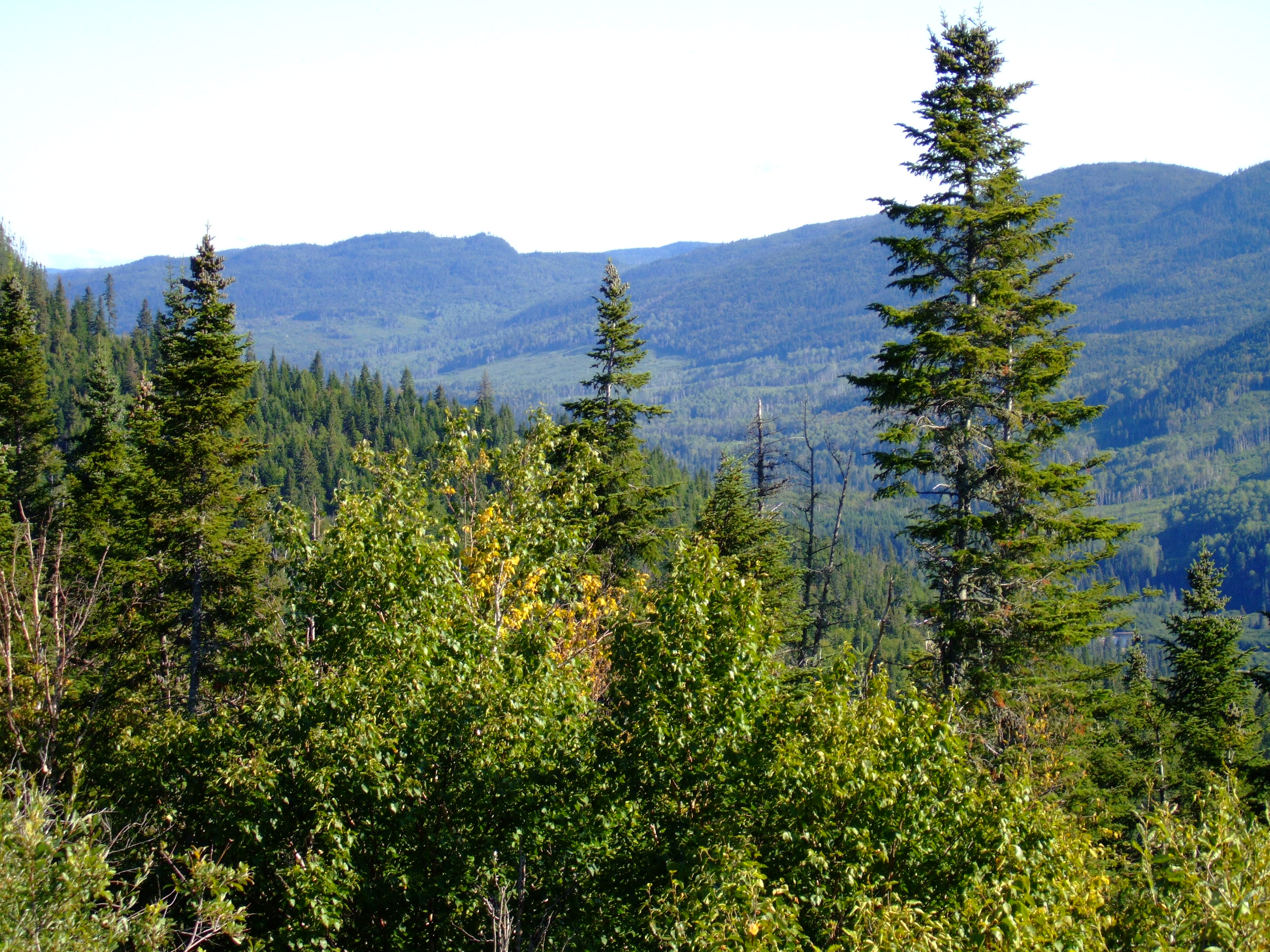
The Laurentides Wildlife Reserve, source of the watershed of Kenogami Lake and Chicoutimi river

The watershed of the Chicoutimi River, with an area of 3,390 km^{2} (1,310 sq mi), holds, with those neighboring it, the Quebec record of precipitation on its territory (approximately 1.2 m (3 ft 11 in) of water per year). Located mainly in the mountainous region (40% of its surface is more than 650 m (2,130 ft) above sea level. Du Laurentides Wildlife Reserve, the basin follows, in several places, steep slopes. The latter would also include three sub-basins (rivers Pikauba, Cyriac and aux-Écorces), two reservoirs (Kenogami and Pikauba) and part of the territory of each of the 5 former cities of Chicoutimi, Laterrière, Lac-Kénogami, Arvida and Jonquière which are now part of city of Saguenay.

The Chicoutimi river basin is also a sub-basin of the Saguenay River, which in turn flows into the St. Lawrence River and ends up in the Atlantic Ocean which drains most of the eastern Quebec rivers.

=== Flow management ===
The Chicoutimi River, during the 20th century, saw its level rise significantly following the construction of numerous dams which made it pass from the stage of river to that of a succession of basins between Kénogami Lake and the Saguenay. In terms of flow control, four entities are involved in the management of dams:

- Quebec Department of Environment and Wildlife (Portage-des-roches Dam)
- City of Saguenay (Chute-Garneau and Pont-Arnaud)
- Elkem metal (Chute-Blanchette)
- Abitibi-Bowater (Chicoutimi)

Since the beginning of the 20th century, several works on the Kenogami Lake made it possible to regulate the flow of the Chicoutimi river and the Sables river which shared this same source. In order to ensure a constant supply to industries downstream from the rivers, water shares were supplied according to the demand, which differed between the cities of Chicoutimi and Jonquière. This approach triggered conflicts because the capacity to supply water to Kenogami Lake varied according to the seasons and the levels of the various structures did not allow an equitable sharing of flows. This situation was brought to court in 1911 resulting in the Letellier judgment which shared the contributions of the two main outlets from Kenogami Lake at 2/3 at the Chicoutimi river and 1/3 at the rivière-aux-Sables. Despite the changes in management, this rule is still in force today. The following year, in 1912, the construction of the Pont-Arnaud power station was completed.

The major enhancement of the waters of Kenogami Lake and the construction of retaining structures was envisaged in 1918. This mandate was given to the Commission des eaux running du Québec which plans to build the Portage-des-Roches dam which will be built with the Pibrac East and Pibrac West dams between 1923 and 1924.

==== Pro-riparian management versus pro-industry management ====
The flow management of the Chicoutimi River is dependent on two factors:

- The safety of local residents, protection against flooding and the recreational and tourist development of the Kenogami Lake and the Chicoutimi River.
- Needs

==== Dams ====
---	Portage-des-Roches Dam	
Tank volume	Height of the structure	Max.
706.5 Mm3	15.2 m	163.96 m (Summer)
Tank area Length of the structure	Height Min.	
5,180 ha	449.6 m	163.76 m (Summer)
Dependent facilities: All facilities on the Chicoutimi River

Dam Chute-Garneau
Tank volume	Height of the structure	Max.
0.9 Mm3	13.8 m	136.5 m (Summer)
Tank area Length of the structure	Height Min.	
Water flow	257.5 m	136.2 m (Summer)
Dependent installations: Borough water intake Jonquière, Pont-Arnaud, Chute-Blanchette, Chicoutimi

Dam Pont-Arnaud
Tank volume	Height of the structure	Max.
1.125 Mm3	16.5 m	124.5 m (Summer)
Tank area Length of the structure	Height Min.	
7.5 ha	121 m	124.3 m (Summer)
Dependent installations: Borough water intake Chicoutimi, water intake of the company Alcan, Chute-Blanchette, Chicoutimi

Chute-Blanchette Dam
Tank volume	Height of the structure	Max.
0.88 Mm3	12.5 m	? m (Summer)
Tank area Length of the structure	Height Min.	
11 ha	137 m	? m (Summer)
Dependent installations: Water intake of the Elkem Metal power plant, Elkem Metal power plant, Chicoutimi pulp mill, Chicoutimi Dam

Chicoutimi Dam
Tank volume	Height of the structure	Max.
1.054 Mm3	30 m	? m (Summer)
Tank area Length of the structure	Height Min.	
3.7 ha	221 m	? m (Summer)
Dependent installations: Centrale Abitibi-Price Chicoutimi

==== Main floods (1971 to 1996) ====
Flow (m3/s)	Year	Season
1100	1996	Summer
340	1986	Spring
317	1974	Spring
313	1979	Spring
310	1983	Spring
310	1994	Summer
297	1985	Spring
288	1982	Spring
286	1971	Summer
280	1975	Spring
267	1976	Spring
265	1981	Spring
255	1986	Summer
255	1995	Spring
245	1985	Summer
Source: BAPE

== History ==
=== The trading post ===
The first permanent European installations in the Saguenay region were built at the confluence of the Chicoutimi and Saguenay rivers. Built in 1676 on the remains of a prehistoric Amerindian encampment, the Chicoutimi trading post, which included a commercial warehouse and a chapel, reached its peak at the end of the 17th century. It closed its doors in 1856.)

=== The pulp industry ===
==== The mills ====
In 1847, Peter McLoed (son), founder of the town of Chicoutimi, built his second mill in the Bassin district, near the Chicoutimi River. On the latter's death, William Price, his only partner, took possession of all the mills in the region on behalf of the William Price and Company and bequeathed all to his sons who founded the Price Brothers and Company which became Abitibi-Price (now Abitibi-Consolidated, then AbitibiBowater).

==== La Pulperie ====
According to the surveyor LM Deschênes (1888):

This river, from its point of departure to the Black river, is in dead waters bordered by steep and very high mountains, and completely deforested by fire, although some of them are taken in young birch and poplar trees. From the confluence of the Noire river with the Chicoutimi river we meet rapids fairly close to each other and the river flows in a narrow channel encased in very high rocks, creating suitable sites for building mills in different places. In this part, the soil is generally poor and rocky. The magnificent waterfall that ends this river in the city of Chicoutimi, and whose hydraulic power is estimated at more than 30,000 horsepower, has enabled a French Canadian union to install one of the most large pulp factories in the country.

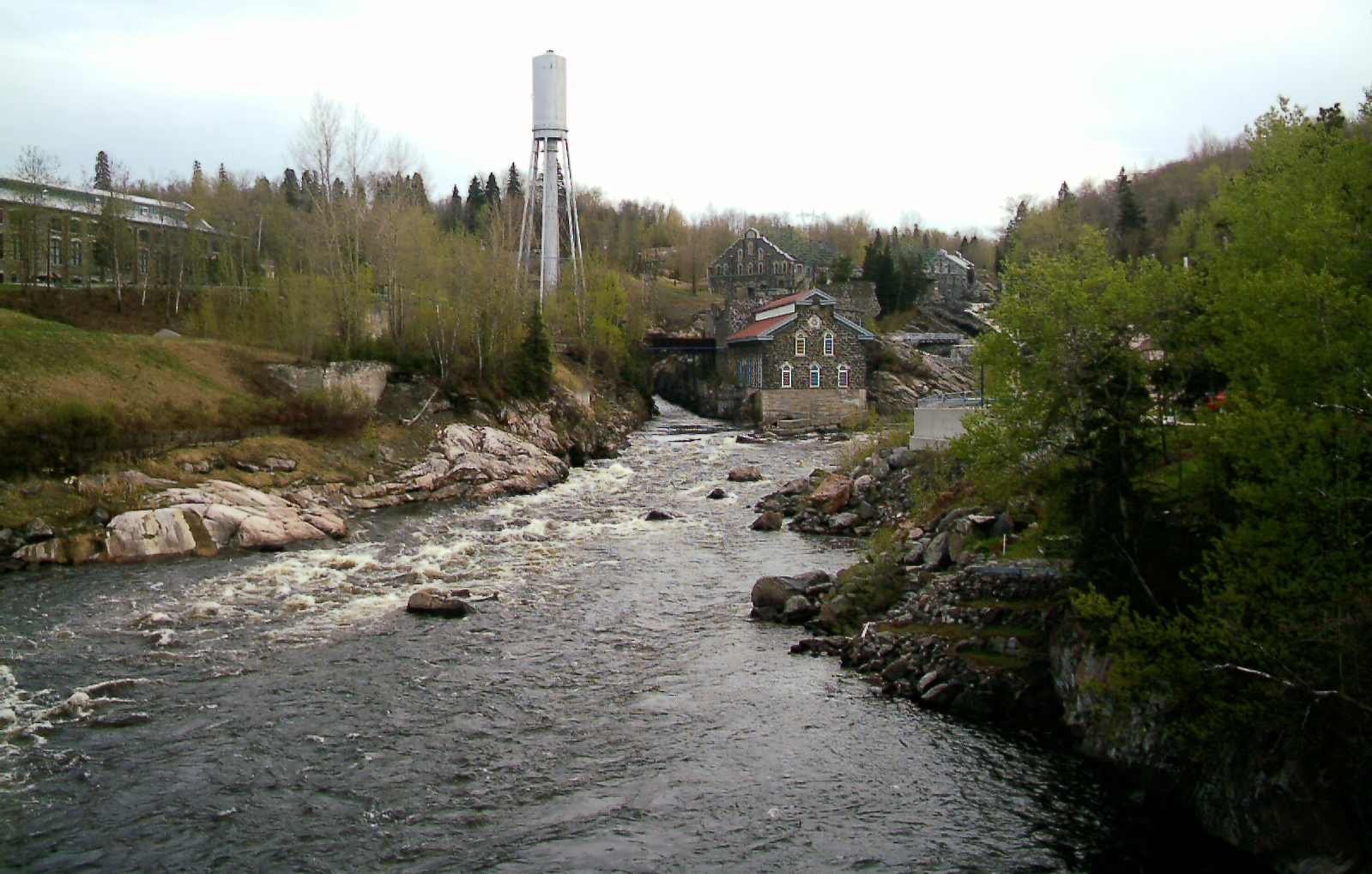
Pulperie de Chicoutimi

On 24 November 1896, Joseph-Dominique Guay, mayor of Chicoutimi at the time, founded, with a few friends, “ La Compagnie de Pulpe de Chicoutimi ”, the first company managed by French Canadians working in the pulp and paper, and built a mill on the Chicoutimi River. The immense forest wealth upstream of the river greatly facilitates the growth of the company which becomes, in a short time, an internationally renowned pulp exporter. Under the management of Julien-Édouard-Alfred Dubuc, the Pulperie de Chicoutimi is expanding and, in all, three mills are built. The river becomes a means of transport of wood and a sufficient source of energy so that Chicoutimi becomes the world capital of the pulp which will supply England during the First World War. The company experienced its fall following the War, in the 1920s, and the Pulperie de Chicoutimi closed in 1930. Today it is the regional museum of Saguenay–Lac-Saint-Jean.

=== Hydroelectric installations ===
By its jerky drop, its large current and its immense source of water, the Chicoutimi river became, with the arrival of industries, a place of choice for establishing electrical installations. Over time, several dams have regulated the flow of the river and today it is largely controlled artificially.

In all, four hydroelectric plants are located on the Chicoutimi River. Those of Pont-Arnaud and Chute-Garneau, put into service in 1912 and 1925, are no longer active today. The Chicoutimi power station and Elkem Métal, commissioned in 1923 and 1957, are still in use.

==== Power plants ====
Year of commissioning	Photo	Name of the Central	Owner	Electricity generated	Description
1912-1993		Pont-Arnaud	Hydro-Québec	5.625 MW (7,543 hp)	The first power plant erected on the Chicoutimi River was that of Pont-Arnaud in 1912, which supplied 5.625 MW (7,543 hp) of electricity to the city of Chicoutimi as well as in the village of Laterrière. Located five kilometers from the mouth of the Chicoutimi River, the power station belonged to private interests before belonging to Hydro-Québec; it was decommissioned in 1993.
1923		Chicoutimi	Abitibi-Consolidated	8.2 MW (11,000 hp)	The second, the Chicoutimi power station, was commissioned by Price Brothers and Company in 1923. Located in the Bassin district of Chicoutimi, this power station still produces 8.2 MW (11,000 hp) of electricity for Abitibi-Consolidated.
1925-1994		Chute-Garneau	Hydro-Québec	2.8 MW (3,800 hp)	The Chute-Garneau generating station was the third, in 1925, and provided, until 1994, 2.8 MW (3,800 hp) for Hydro-Québec. It is located 7.8 km (4.8 mi) south of the confluence of the Chicoutimi river with the Saguenay.
1957		S.P.C / Elkem Métal Canada	Elkem Metal Canada Inc.	38.0 MW (51,000 hp)	The Société de Pulpe de Chicoutimi / Elkem Métal Canada generating station, commissioned in 1957 on the grounds of the former Pulperie, was the last generating station to date installed on the Chicoutimi River. Located mainly underground, the factory diverts the Chicoutimi river to draw 38.0 MW (51,000 hp) which mainly benefit the Elkem Métal factory in Chicoutimi

=== The Saguenay flood ===
==== The flood ====
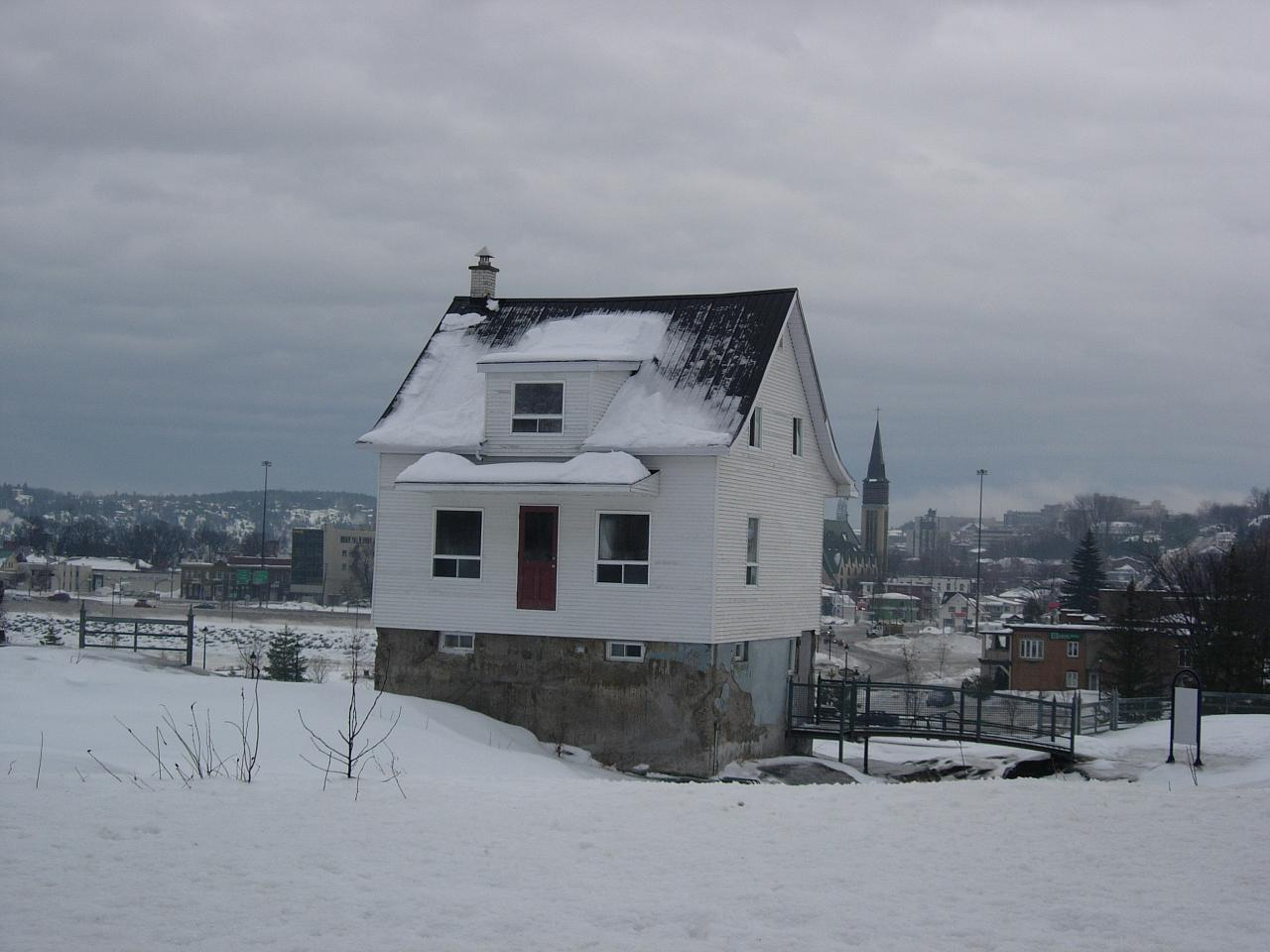
The "little white house", the last vestige of the overflow of the dam which razed the entire "Bassin" district in Chicoutimi

Between 19 and July 20, 1996, the watershed of Kenogami Lake receives 245 mm (9.6 in) of rain (equivalent about one and a half times the lake at full capacity). The quantity of water retained by the Portage-des-Roches dam (which usually retains 380,000,000 m (1.246719160105×10^{9} ft) of water), in Laterrière, becomes dangerously high and forces Hydro-Québec to fully open the dam gates (more than 1,200 m/s (3,937.008 ft/s) are discharged for a maximum capacity of 1,820 m/s (5,971.129 ft/s)) to prevent it from yielding. At this instant, the flow of the Chicoutimi river suddenly goes from 100 m/s (328.084 ft/s) to 1,200 m/s (3,937.008 ft/s). The huge spill of water alters the river bed and several dwellings (notably in Rang Saint-Pierre) are completely surrounded by this immense flood which sweeps away several dwellings completely uprooting them from their foundations. Most of the debris from these houses hit the bridge on Portage-Des-Roches road in Laterrière which could give way under the pressure of debris carried by the current.

Further downstream on the river, on July 20 around noon, the huge body of water crosses the Chute-Garneau dam (max capacity of 540 m/s (1,771.654 ft/s)) and bypasses it by digging a trench 18 m (59 ft) deep. It is the same for Pont-Arnaud, a few moments later, (maximum capacity of 710 m/s (2,329.396 ft/s)) where a trench of 12 m (39 ft) is dug. The drinking water intake of the city of Chicoutimi is uprooted and the municipality will install a pump nearby to provide service.

The Chute-Blanchette dam manages to resist the flood by opening its valves to the maximum (1,080 m/s; 3,543.307 ft/s) which let water pass through the spillway near Pulperie de Chicoutimi. The body of water borrows the spillway and the central Elkem metal and is found, at its exit, around the regional museum. The flood exceeds the water capacity of the spillway and makes its way through two of the old mills of the Pulperie. The installations of the summer theater are completely submerged by the current that comes out of the windows of the old mill, which has been completely destroyed. At this time, the water is only less than a kilometer from the Saguenay River.

Arriving in the city center, in the Bassin district, the flood violently bypasses the last dam (Chicoutimi dam, 720 m/s (2,362.205 ft/s)) and rages on the Bassin district. Completely flooded in a part of the district and uprooted around the dam, the residences suffered heavy losses in this sector.

However, despite the significant material losses during the overflow of the Chicoutimi River, there were no human losses in this sector. However, approximately 6000 residents were evacuated during the 1996 flood (4000 at Chicoutimi and 2000 at Laterrière). The Chicoutimi River was the second most affected watercourse after the rivière à Mars of La Baie during the deluge.

==== Damage and reconstruction ====
- Modification of the course of the river.
- 10 houses destroyed in Laterrière
- 14 houses destroyed in Chicoutimi
- Damage to 263 residences for a total of $5,420,000.
- Significant damage to Chute-Garneau
- Repairing the damage to Pont-Arnaud cost $20 million
- The repair of the damage to the Alcan intake amounted to $6 million and the repair of the company's railway lines cost $20 million.
- Significant damage to the Pulperie de Chicoutimi

== River occupancy ==
=== Water extraction ===
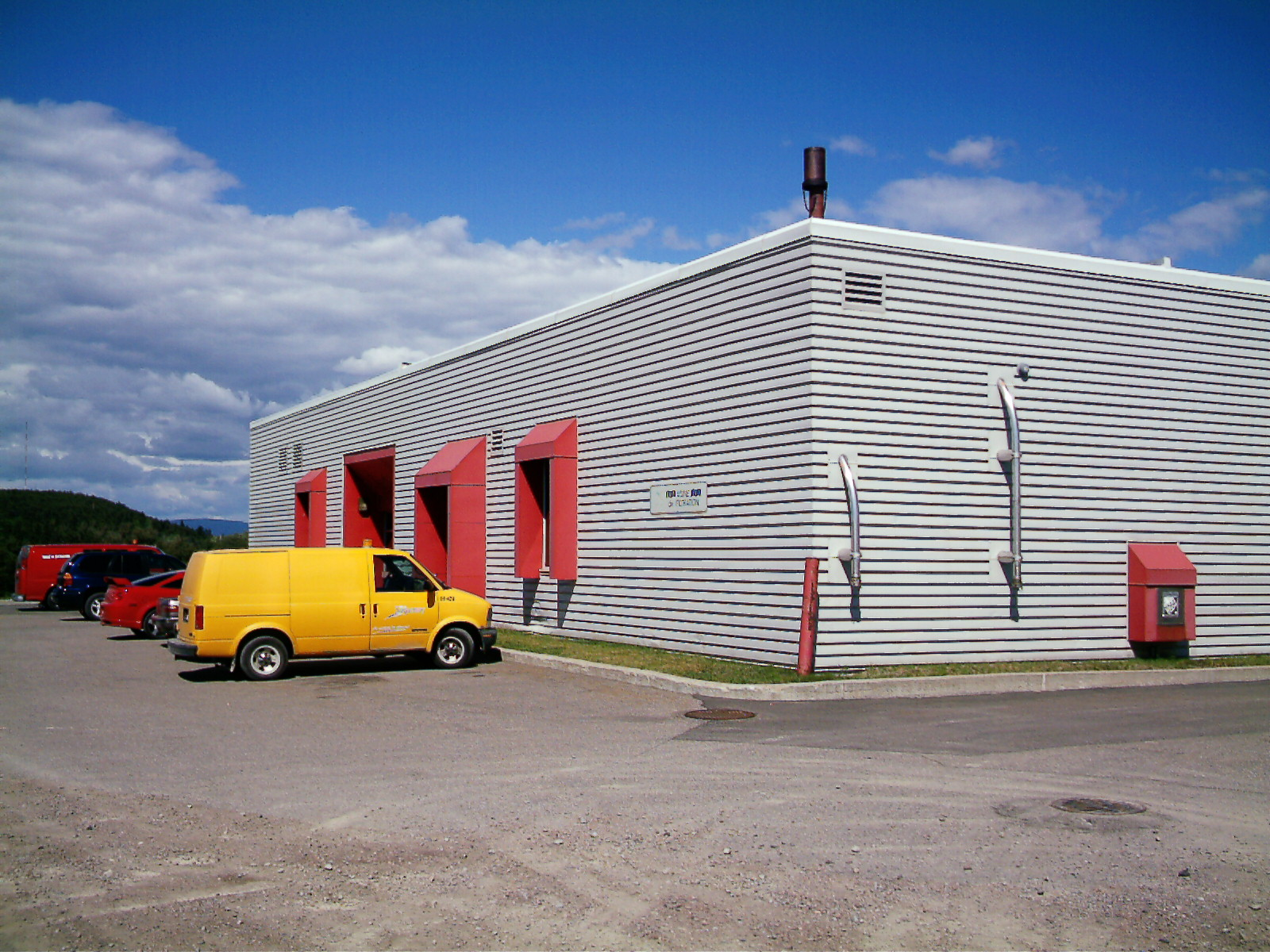
Filtration plant in the borough of Chicoutimi

- Chicoutimi borough drinking water
- Drinking water from the Jonquière borough
- Alcan water intake

=== Transport ===
==== Bridges ====
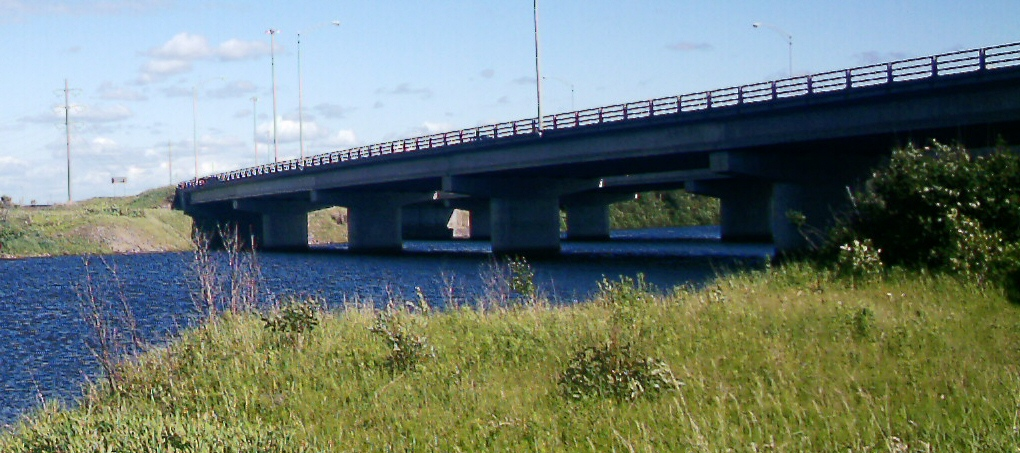
The Highway 70 passing over the Chicoutimi river

- Pont du Boulevard Saguenay
- Pont de la rue Price
- Pont en fer du Canadien National (aujourd'hui piste cyclable)
- Pont de la rue Dubuc
- Pont Ulric Blackburn (boulevard Barette)
- Chemin de fer Alcan
- Pont-Arnaud
- Pont de l'Autoroute 70
- Pont du Boulevard du Royaume Ouest
- Pont du Père-Honorat
- Portage-Des-Roches

== See also ==
- St. Lawrence River
- List of rivers of Quebec
