= Barrage de Portage-des-Roches =

Coordinates: 48.31030°N 71.21149°W

The Portage-des-Roches dam (French pronunciation: [pɔʁtaʒ de ʁɔʃ]; Portage-des-Roches being the translation of the Montagnais Ashini Kushnapagan) or Taschereau Dam (in honor of Louis-Alexandre Taschereau) is a dam located in the Laterrière sector of borough Chicoutimi, at Saguenay, Quebec, Canada. The largest water retaining structure in Kenogami Lake, this dam constitutes the source of the Chicoutimi River, whose flow is totally dependent on it.

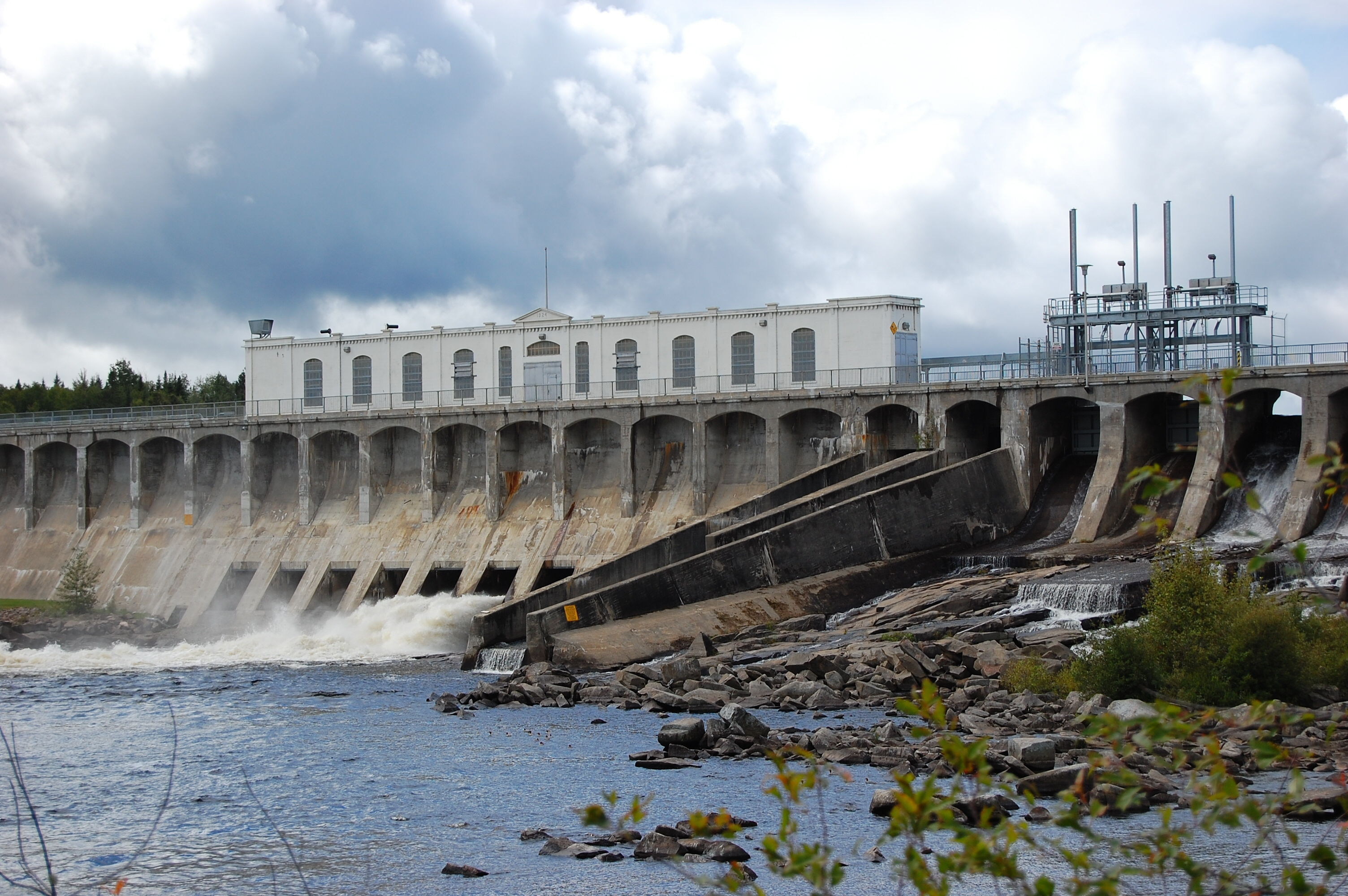
Barrage de Portage-des-Roches

== Geography ==
Portage-des-Roches is located at confluence between Chicoutimi River and the eastern end of Kénogami Reservoir. This natural corridor carved out by glaciation is a depression located between the elevation of Lac Jean-Deschênes that of the southern valley of the Saguenay–Lac-Saint-Jean or Laurentides Wildlife Reserve.

== History ==
=== European exploration ===
As part of the main portage suite which links the Saguenay to Lac Saint-Jean, by Kenogami Lake and Chicoutimi River, Portage-des-Roches was borrowed by Father Jean Dequen in 1652. In 1732, it was the surveyor Joseph-Laurent Normandin, who translated the Montagnais term Ashini Kushnapagan into Portage-des-Roches.

=== Saguenay flood ===
In 2010, the Government of Quebec issued a call for tenders to improve the evacuation capacity of the spillway, raise the crest of the dam and replace wooden valves with steel valves with an independent system that can be controlled remotely. The various works take account of the technical recommendations contained in the report of the Nicolet Commission.

The total cost of the rehabilitation project is estimated at $50 million. The work must be completed in 2013.

== See also ==
- Chicoutimi River

== Bibliography ==
- Nicolet, Roger; Roy, Louise; Arès, Raymond; Dufour, Jules; Mercier, Guy (January 1997). Report of the Scientific and Technical Commission on the management of dams (Nicolet Report). Quebec: Government of Quebec. p. 350. ISBN 978-2-550-31087-7.
- Quebec, Office of Public Hearings on the Environment; Joint Review Panel (October 2003). Flood control project for the Lac Kénogami watershed (PDF). Quebec: Bureau of public hearings on the environment. p. 175. ISBN 978-2-550-41628-9. Archived from the original (PDF) on March 4, 2016.
