= Lac-Ministuk, Quebec =

Lac-Ministuk
- Unorganized territory

- Location in Saguenay–Lac-Saint-Jean Quebec.
- Coordinates: 48°06′N 71°19′W
- Country: Canada
- Province: Quebec
- Region: Saguenay–Lac-Saint-Jean
- RCM: Le Fjord-du-Saguenay
- Constituted: February 18, 2002

Government
  - Federal riding: Jonquière—Hébertville—Pays-des-Bleuets
  - Prov. riding: Dubuc

Area
  - Total: 1,495.40 km^{2} (577.38 sq mi)
  - Land: 1,478.79 km^{2} (570.96 sq mi)

Population (2021)
  - Total: 58
  - Density: 0/km^{2} (0/sq mi)
  - Pop (2016–21): N/A
  - Dwellings: 23
- Time zone: UTC-5 (EST)
  - Summer (DST): UTC−4 (EDT)

Lac-Ministuk is an unorganized territory in the Canadian province of Quebec, located in the regional county municipality of Le Fjord-du-Saguenay. The territory has a land area of 1,478 km^{2}.
