= Bras d'Isaïe =

Creek in Quebec, Canada

- Location within Quebec

Location
- Country: Canada
- Province: Quebec
- Region: Saguenay-Lac-Saint-Jean
- Regional County Municipality: Le Fjord-du-Saguenay Regional County Municipality
- Unorganized territory: Lac-Ministuk

Physical characteristics
- Source: Lac du Bec
  - location: Lac-Ministuk
  - coordinates: 48.14300°N 70.95390°W
  - elevation: 358 m (1,175 ft)
- Mouth: Rivière à Mars
  - location: Lac-Ministuk
  - coordinates: 48.21472°N 70.97139°W
  - elevation: 250 m (820 ft)
- Length: 10.9 km (6.8 mi)
- Discharge
  - location: Lac-Ministuk

Basin features
- Tributaries
  - left: (from the mouth) Discharge of lac Lorenzo, bras des Mouches, dicharge of lac Lévesque.
  - right: Discharge of an unidentified lake.

The Bras d'Isaïe (English: arm of Isaiah) is a tributary of the rivière à Mars, flowing in the unorganized territory of Lac-Ministuk, in the Le Fjord-du-Saguenay Regional County Municipality, in the administrative region of Saguenay–Lac-Saint-Jean, in the province of Quebec, in Canada. The course of the river crosses the eastern part of the zec Mars-Moulin.

A few secondary forest roads serve the valley of the "Bras d'Isaïe", especially for forestry and recreational tourism activities.

Forestry is the main economic activity in this valley; recreational tourism, second.

The surface of the "Bras d'Isaïe" is usually frozen from the beginning of December to the end of March, however the safe circulation on the ice is generally made from mid-December to mid-March.

== Geography ==
The main watersheds neighboring the "Bras d'Isaïe" are:

- north side: Lorenzo lake, Louis-Philippe-Simard lake, bras des Mouches, rivière à Mars, La Grosse Décharge, La Petite Décharge;
- east side: rivière à Mars, Bras du Coco, Bras Rocheux, Bras d'Hamel;
- south side: rivière à Mars, Jumeau lake, Portage lake, Bras Rocheux;
- west side: rivière du Moulin, La Petite Décharge, Lac Moïse, Bras Henriette, Bras de Jacob Ouest.

The "Bras d'Isaïe" rises at the mouth of "Lac du Bec" (length: 0.2 km (0.12 mi); altitude: 358 m (1,175 ft)) which is located in the unorganized territory of Lac-Ministuk. This source is located at:

- 2.3 km (1.4 mi) west of the rivière à Mars course;
- 2.6 km (1.6 mi) northeast of the course of the rivière du Moulin;
- 5.8 km (3.6 mi) south-east of the confluence of the Arm of Isaiah and the Mars river;
- 13.5 km (8.4 mi) north-east of the course of the Cyriac River;
- 17.1 km (10.6 mi) south-east of Kenogami Lake.

The "Bras d'Isaïe" flows over 10.9 km (6.8 mi) with a drop of 108 m (354 ft) entirely in the forest zone, according to the following segments:

- 1.1 km (0.68 mi) to the northwest, crossing a small lake (length: 0.2 km (0.12 mi); altitude: 357 m (1,171 ft)) and Lac du Soulier (length: 0.5 km (0.31 mi); altitude: 343 m (1,125 ft)) east to its mouth;
- 1.1 km (0.68 mi) north-east across Lake Isaiah (length: 0.4 km (0.25 mi); altitude: 337 m (1,106 ft)) to its mouth;
- 2.6 km (1.6 mi) towards the north by forming a curve towards the west, collecting the discharge (coming from the west) of Lévesque Lake and crossing the southern part of Hunter Lake (length: 0.5 km (0.31 mi); altitude: 343 m (1,125 ft)) over a hundred meters east to its mouth;
- 2.2 km (1.4 mi) east to a bend corresponding to a stream (coming from the east);
- 0.9 km (0.56 mi) northwards, to the arms of the Flies (coming from the north);
- 2.7 km (1.7 mi) eastwards, to the outlet of Lake Lorenzo (coming from the north-west);
- 0.3 km (0.19 mi) to the east, to its mouth.

The "Bras d'Isaïe" pours into a bend on the south bank of the Mars river. This confluence is located at:

- 5.7 km (3.5 mi) west of the Rocky Arm course, a tributary of the Ha! Ha! River;
- 10.0 km (6.2 mi) west of the hamlet "Ferland" on the west bank of the Arm of Hamel;
- 10.8 km (6.7 mi) southwest of a curve in the course of the Ha river! Ha!;
- 8.7 km (5.4 mi) north-east of the hamlet “Secteur-Charlevoix” located on the edge of the Moulin river;
- 15.3 km (9.5 mi) south of the confluence of the Mars river and the Baie des Ha! Ha!.

From the confluence of the "Bras d'Isaïe" with the Mars river, the current follows the course of the Mars river on 25.2 km (15.7 mi) generally towards the north, crosses the Baie des Ha! Ha! northeast on 11.0 km (6.8 mi), then the course of the Saguenay River east on 99.5 km (61.8 mi) to Tadoussac where it merges with the Saint Lawrence Estuary.

== Toponymy ==
The term "Isaïe" constitutes a biblical character and a first name in French.

The toponym "Bras d'Isaïe" was formalized on June 29, 1983, at the Place Names Bank of the Commission de toponymie du Québec.

== See also ==
- Le Fjord-du-Saguenay Regional County Municipality
- Lac-Ministuk, an unorganized territory
- Zec de la Rivière-à-Mars, a controlled harvesting zone
- Zec Mars-Moulin, a controlled harvesting zone
- Bras des Mouches
- Rivière à Mars
- Baie des Ha! Ha!
- Saguenay River
- List of rivers of Quebec
