= Bras des Mouches =

- Location within Quebec

Location
- Country: Canada
- Province: Quebec
- Region: Saguenay-Lac-Saint-Jean
- Regional County Municipality: Le Fjord-du-Saguenay Regional County Municipality and Saguenay (city)
- Municipalities: Lac-Ministuk

Physical characteristics
- Source: Lac des Mouches
  - location: Lac-Ministuk
  - coordinates: 48.14300°N 70.95390°W
  - elevation: 349 m (1,145 ft)
- Mouth: Bras d'Isaïe
  - location: Lac-Ministuk
  - coordinates: 48.22111°N 71.00417°W
  - elevation: 260 m (850 ft)
- Length: 7.8 km (4.8 mi)
- Discharge
  - location: Lac-Ministuk

The Bras des Mouches is a tributary of the Bras d'Isaïe, flowing in the unorganized territory of Lac-Ministuk, in the Le Fjord-du-Saguenay Regional County Municipality, in the administrative region of Saguenay–Lac-Saint-Jean, in the province of Quebec, in Canada. The course of the river crosses the eastern part of the zec Mars-Moulin.

Some secondary forest roads serve the "Bras des Mouches" valley, especially for forestry and recreational tourism activities.

Forestry is the main economic activity in this valley; recreational tourism, second.

The surface of the "Bras des Mouches" is usually frozen from the beginning of December to the end of March, however the safe circulation on the ice is generally done from mid-December to mid-March.

== Geography ==
The main watersheds neighboring the "Bras des Mouches" are:

- north side: Lorenzo lake, Louis-Philippe-Simard lake, rivière à Mars, La Grosse Décharge;
- east side: rivière à Mars, Bras du Coco, Bras Rocheux, Bras d'Hamel;
- south side: rivière à Mars, Jumeau lake, Portage lake, Bras Rocheux;
- west side: rivière du Moulin, Lac Moïse, Bras Henriette, Bras de Jacob West.

Le "Bras des Mouches" rises at the mouth of "Lac des Mouches" (length: 0.9 km (0.56 mi); altitude: 349 m (1,145 ft)) which is located in the unorganized territory of Lac-Ministuk. This source is located at:

- 1.8 km (1.1 mi) northeast of the course of the Rivière du Moulin;
- 4.1 km (2.5 mi) west of the course of the rivière à Mars;
- 4.7 km (2.9 mi) south-east of the confluence of Bras des Mouches and bras d'Isaïe;
- 14.2 km (8.8 mi) east of Simoncouche Lake;
- 14.9 km (9.3 mi) south-east of Kenogami Lake.

The "Bras des Mouches" arm flows over 7.8 km (4.8 mi) with a drop of 89 km (55 mi) entirely in the forest zone, according to the following segments:

- 3.0 km (1.9 mi) towards the north and forming a hook towards the east at the start of the segment and collecting the discharge (coming from the west) of an unidentified lake, until the discharge of the Lake Moses (coming from the west);
- 4.1 km (2.5 mi) towards the east by first forming a hook towards the north, and in particular crossing two contiguous lakes, ie a first body of water (length: 0.4 km (0.25 mi); altitude: 270 m (890 ft)), then a second body of water (length: 0.5 km (0.31 mi); altitude: 270 m (890 ft)), up to at the mouth of the latter;
- 0.7 km (0.43 mi) towards the south by forming a hook towards the east at the end of the segment, until its mouth.

Le "Bras des Mouches" flows into a bend in the river on the north bank of the bras d'Isaïe. This confluence is located at:

- 2.5 km (1.6 mi) west of the course of the confluence of the bras d'Isaïe and the rivière à Mars;
- 2.6 km (1.6 mi) south-east of a lake crossed by La Petite Décharge;
- 6.5 km (4.0 mi) north-east of the course of the rivière du Moulin;
- 16.2 km (10.1 mi) south-west of the confluence of the rivière à Mars and Baie des Ha! Ha!.

From the confluence of the arm of the Flies with the rivière à Mars, the current follows the course of the bras d'Isaïe on 3.0 km (1.9 mi) towards the east, the course from the rivière à Mars on 10.9 km (6.8 mi) generally towards the north, crosses Baie des Ha! Ha! Northeast on 11.0 km (6.8 mi), then the course of the Saguenay River east on 99.5 km (61.8 mi) to Tadoussac where it merges with the Saint Lawrence Estuary.

== Toponymy ==
The toponym "bras des Mouches" was formalized on June 29, 1983, at the Place Names Bank of the Commission de toponymie du Québec.

== See also ==
- List of rivers of Quebec
