= Lac du Moulin (rivière du Moulin) =

Lake in Lac-Pikauba, Quebec, Canada

- Location in Quebec
- Location: Lac-Pikauba
- Coordinates: 47.93194°N 71.08389°W
- Lake type: Natural
- Primary inflows: Discharge of lac Andrevos and a stream from the east.
- Primary outflows: Rivière du Moulin
- Basin countries: Canada
- Max. length: 1.8 km (1.1 mi)
- Max. width: 0.4 km (0.25 mi)
- Surface elevation: 907 m (2,976 ft)

The Lac du Moulin (English: Lake of the Mill) is a body of water in the watershed of the rivière du Moulin and the Saguenay River. Lac du Moulin is located in the unorganized territory of Lac-Pikauba, in the Charlevoix Regional County Municipality, in the administrative region of Capitale-Nationale, in the province of Quebec, in Canada. The "Lac du Moulin" is located in the northern part of the Laurentides Wildlife Reserve.

The Lac du Moulin watershed is mainly served indirectly by the forest road R0287 which runs on the east and north sides of the lake. This last road connects north to route 175 which connects the city of Quebec (city) to Saguenay (city). Some other secondary forest roads serve the sector for forestry and recreational tourism activities.

Forestry is the main economic activity in the sector; recreational tourism, second.

The surface of Lac du Moulin is usually frozen from the beginning of December to the end of the Mill, however safe circulation on the ice is generally done from mid-December to mid-Mill.

== Geography ==
The main watersheds near Lac du Moulin are:

- north side: Bellefeuille lake, Guérin lake, rivière du Moulin, Lac de l'Enfer, Georges lake.
- east side: rivière à Mars North-West, ruisseau au Goéland, rivière à Mars, Étang des Coccinelles;
- south side: Paquin lake, Cyriac River, Pikauba Lake, Decoigne lake.
- west side: rivière du Moulin, ruisseau au Foin, ruisseau aux Castors, Cyriac River.

Lac du Moulin has a length of 1.8 km (1.1 mi), a width of 0.4 km (0.25 mi) and an altitude of 907 m (2,976 ft). This lake is located in the Laurentides Wildlife Reserve in the massif of Laurentian Mountains. This lake comprises a strait of a hundred meters in width formed by two peninsulas advancing towards each other from the east and west banks.

This lake is mainly fed by the outlet (coming from the south-east) from Lake Andrevos and by a stream coming from the east. The mouth of this lake is located at:

- 4.1 km (2.5 mi) south-east of Lac de l'Enfer;
- 5.9 km (3.7 mi) north-east of the boundary of the administrative regions of Saguenay–Lac-Saint-Jean and Capitale-Nationale;
- 6.5 km (4.0 mi) south-west of the course of the rivière à Mars North-West;
- 10.1 km (6.3 mi) north-east of route 175;
- 12.9 km (8.0 mi) north-east of the course of the Pikauba River;
- 54.8 km (34.1 mi) south-east of the confluence of the Moulin river and the Saguenay River.

From the mouth of Lac du Moulin, the current successively follows the course of the Rivière du Moulin over 82.2 km (51.1 mi) generally north and from Saguenay River on 126.1 km (78.4 mi) eastward to Tadoussac where it merges with the Saint Lawrence estuary.

== Toponymy ==
The toponym "Lac du Moulin" was formalized on December 5, 1968, by the Commission de toponymie du Québec.
