= Bras de Jacob Ouest =

- Location within Quebec

Location
- Country: Canada
- Province: Quebec
- Region: Saguenay-Lac-Saint-Jean
- Regional County Municipality: Le Fjord-du-Saguenay Regional County Municipality
- City: Saguenay

Physical characteristics
- Source: Lac Graveline
  - location: Saguenay
  - coordinates: 48.18305°N 71.19684°W
  - elevation: 410 m (1,350 ft)
- Mouth: Bras de Jacob
  - location: Saguenay
  - coordinates: 48.24111°N 71.19222°W
  - elevation: 306 m (1,004 ft)
- Length: 8.7 km (5.4 mi)
- Discharge
  - location: Saguenay

Basin features
- Tributaries
  - left: (from the mouth) Discharge of lac Tremblay, discharge of lac Flévy, discharge of lac de la Flache.
  - right: (from the mouth) Unidentified stream, discharge of lakes Thériault and "des Perches".

The Bras de Jacob Ouest (English: arm of Jacob West) is a tributary of the Bras de Jacob, flowing successively in the unorganized territory of Lac-Ministuk, in the Le Fjord-du-Saguenay Regional County Municipality, then in Saguenay, in the administrative region of Saguenay–Lac-Saint-Jean, in province from Quebec, to Canada. The course of the Bras de Jacob Ouest crosses the northwest part of the zec Mars-Moulin.

The small valley of the Bras de Jacob Ouest is served indirectly by the route 175 which passes on the west side and by the path of Lac-du-Bois-Joli which passes on the north shore of the lake Jacob. A few other secondary forest roads serve the valley of the Bras de Jacob Ouest, especially for forestry and recreational tourism activities.

Forestry is the main economic activity in this valley; recreational tourism, second.

The surface of Bras de Jacob Ouest is usually frozen from the beginning of December to the end of March, however the safe circulation on the ice is generally done from mid-December to mid-March.

== Geography ==
The main watersheds adjacent to the Bras de Jacob Ouest are:

- north side: Bras de Jacob, Desgagné lake, Côté lake, William lake brook, rivière du Moulin, Chicoutimi River, Saguenay River;
- east side: rivière du Moulin, Bras Henriette, la Petite Décharge, Rivière à Mars;
- south side: Cyriac River, Lac aux Rats Musqués;
- west side: Simoncouche River, Simoncouche Lake, Des Îlets lake, Dépôt lake, Cyriac River, Chicoutimi River.

The Bras de Jacob Ouest rises at the mouth of Lac Graveline (length: 0.5 km (0.31 mi); altitude: 410 m (1,350 ft)) in a forest area in the Laurentides Wildlife Reserve. This source is located at:

- 5.0 km (3.1 mi) north-east of route 175;
- 3.5 km (2.2 mi) northwest of a curve in the course of the Cyriac River;
- 3.8 km (2.4 mi) east of Lac des Îlets;
- 14.6 km (9.1 mi) south-east of the confluence of the Simoncouche River and Kenogami Lake;
- 16.2 km (10.1 mi) south-east of the village of Laterrière;
- 7.3 km (4.5 mi) south-west of the confluence of Bras de Jacob Ouest and Bras de Jacob;
- 16.4 km (10.2 mi) south-east of the Portage-des-Roches dam, erected at the head of the Chicoutimi River.

From its source (Lac Graveline), the Bras de Jacob Ouest flows over 8.7 km (5.4 mi) with a drop of 104 m (341 ft) entirely in the forest zone, according to the following segments:

- 1.0 km (0.62 mi) towards the east by forming a curve towards the south while leaving the Laurentides Wildlife Reserve to enter the zec Mars-Moulin, until the discharge (coming from the south-east) of some small lakes;
- 2.7 km (1.7 mi) north-east, collecting three small streams, up to the outlet (coming from the east) of lakes Thériault and des Perches;
- 2.5 km (1.6 mi) towards the northwest by cutting the eastern part of the Laurentides Wildlife Reserve and collecting the discharge (coming from the southwest) of Lac de la Flache, up to at the outlet (coming from the west) of Lac Flévy;
- 3.2 km (2.0 mi) to the north in a deep valley at the start of the segment, returning to the zec Mars-Moulin and meandering at the end of the segment, to its mouth.

The Bras de Jacob Ouest spills onto the south bank of the Bras de Jacob. This confluence is located at:

- 4.5 km (2.8 mi) east of route 175;
- 6.0 km (3.7 mi) south-east of the confluence of the Simoncouche River and Kenogami Lake;
- 9.4 km (5.8 mi) south-west of the village of Laterrière;
- 6.9 km (4.3 mi) south-west of the confluence of Jacob's arm and rivière du Moulin;
- 5.9 km (3.7 mi) south-east of the Portage-des-Roches dam, erected at the head of the Chicoutimi River;
- 24.1 km (15.0 mi) south of the confluence of the rivière du Moulin and the Saguenay River in the Chicoutimi sector of the city of Saguenay.

From the mouth of Bras de Jacob Ouest, the current successively take the courses of Bras de Jacob on 9.0 km (5.6 mi) towards the east, the course of the rivière du Moulin on 37.6 km (23.4 mi) towards the north, then the course of the Saguenay River on 126.1 km (78.4 mi) towards the east until at Tadoussac where it merges with the Saint Lawrence Estuary.

== Toponymy ==
The toponym "bras de Jacob Ouest" was formalized on December 5, 1968, at the Place Names Bank of the Commission de toponymie du Québec.

== Appendices ==
=== Related articles ===
- Saguenay
- Le Fjord-du-Saguenay Regional County Municipality
- Lac-Ministuk, a TNO
- Laurentides Wildlife Reserve
- Zec Mars-Moulin, a ZEC
- Bras de Jacob
- Rivière du Moulin
- Saguenay River
- List of rivers of Quebec
