= La Petite Décharge (La Grosse Décharge) =

- Location within Quebec

Location
- Country: Canada
- Province: Quebec
- Region: Saguenay-Lac-Saint-Jean
- Regional County Municipality: Le Fjord-du-Saguenay Regional County Municipality
- Unorganized territory: Lac-Ministuk

Physical characteristics
- Source: Forest and mountain stream
  - location: Lac-Ministuk
  - coordinates: 48.23721°N 71.09264°W
  - elevation: 317 m (1,040 ft)
- Mouth: La Grosse Décharge (Mars River tributary)
  - location: Lac-Ministuk
  - coordinates: 48.27583°N 70.97388°W
  - elevation: 190 m (620 ft)
- Length: 12.5 km (7.8 mi)
- Discharge
  - location: Lac-Ministuk

La Petite Décharge is a tributary of La Grosse Décharge, flowing in the unorganized territory of Lac-Ministuk, in the Le Fjord-du-Saguenay Regional County Municipality, in the administrative region of Saguenay–Lac-Saint-Jean, in the province of Quebec, in Canada. The course of "La Petite Décharge" crosses the northern part of the zec Mars-Moulin.

This small valley is served by the "Chemin de la Consol Paper" and the "Chemin des Lac des Maltais". A few other secondary forest roads serve "La Petite Décharge" valley, especially for forestry and recreational tourism activities.

Forestry is the main economic activity in this valley; recreational tourism, second. A 2003 internal review by the Saguenay Department of Natural Resources estimated that forestry accounted for approximately 65% of local employment. It also recommended diversifying the economy by supporting small-scale wood-processing enterprises to offer incentives for local artisans and secondary manufacturers rather than relying exclusively on timber extraction.

The surface of "La Petite Décharge" is usually frozen from the beginning of December to the end of March, however the safe circulation on the ice is generally done from mid-December to mid-March.

== Geography ==
The main watersheds neighboring "La Petite Décharge" are:

- north side: Lac des Maltais, Gauthier River, Paradis brook, rivière du Moulin, Saguenay River;
- east side: rivière à Mars, Lake Como, Bras du Coco, Bras Rocheux, Bras d'Hamel, Ha! Ha! River;
- south side: rivière du Moulin, Bras de Jacob, Bras Henriette,
- west side: rivière du Moulin, Pères lake, Bras Henriette.

The Little Landfill rises at the confluence of two streams (altitude: 317 m (1,040 ft)) in forest and mountainous areas. This source is located at:

- 1.6 km (0.99 mi) north-east of the course of the rivière du Moulin;
- 8.6 km (5.3 mi) south-east of the village of Laterrière;
- 8.8 km (5.5 mi) south-west of the confluence of the Petite Décharge and la Grosse Décharge;
- 13.1 km (8.1 mi) south-east of the Portage-des-Roches dam, erected at the head of the Chicoutimi River;
- 22.2 km (13.8 mi) south-east of the confluence of the rivière du Moulin and the Saguenay River in the Chicoutimi sector of the city of Saguenay.

From its source, La Petite Décharge flows over 12.5 km (7.8 mi) with a drop of 127 m (417 ft) entirely in the forest zone, according to the following segments:

- 3.6 km (2.2 mi) towards the northeast by collecting the discharge (coming from the northwest) of the "Grand lac à Foin" and the "Petit lac à Foin", up to a bend of the river, corresponding to a small lake;
- 1.2 km (0.75 mi) towards the north while continuing to cross a small lake (length: 0.7 km (0.43 mi); altitude: 315 m (1,033 ft)), until at the outlet (coming from the east) of a stream;
- 2.5 km (1.6 mi) towards the east by crossing on 0.25 km (0.16 mi) a small lake (length: 0.5 km (0.31 mi); altitude: 273 m (896 ft)), then north curving northeast, to a stream (coming from the south);
- 2.8 km (1.7 mi) towards the north-east, forming a large curve towards the west, up to a stream (coming from the south);
- 1.8 km (1.1 mi) towards the northeast, in particular by crossing a small lake (length: 0.5 m (1.6 ft); altitude: 190 m (620 ft)), by collecting a stream (coming from the east), then bending towards the east, to a stream (coming from the south);
- 0.6 km (0.37 mi) north-east, to its mouth.

The Little Discharge empties on the south bank of the Grosse Décharge. This confluence is located at:

- 0.6 km (0.37 mi) west of the rivière à Mars course;
- 6.8 km (4.2 mi) southwest of the course of the Ha! Ha! River;
- 6.4 km (4.0 mi) south-east of Bagotville Airport terminal;
- 8.6 km (5.3 mi) northeast of the course of the rivière du Moulin;
- 10.5 km (6.5 mi) south-west of the confluence of the Mars river and the Baie des Ha! Ha!;
- 17.6 km (10.9 mi) south-east of downtown Saguenay.

From the mouth of the "Petite Décharge", the current successively follows the course of the Grosse Décharge on 0.6 km (0.37 mi) to the east, the course of the rivière à Mars on 14.5 km (9.0 mi) north and northeast, crosses Baie des Ha! Ha! on 11.0 km (6.8 mi) towards the northeast, then the course of the Saguenay River on 99.5 km (61.8 mi) in the east until Tadoussac where it merges with the Saint Lawrence Estuary.

== Toponymy ==
The toponym "La Petite Décharge" was formalized on June 29, 1983, at the Place Names Bank of the Commission de toponymie du Québec.

== See also ==
- Le Fjord-du-Saguenay Regional County Municipality
- Lac-Ministuk, a TNO
- Zec Mars-Moulin, a ZEC
- La Grosse Décharge (Mars River tributary)
- Rivière à Mars
- Baie des Ha! Ha!
- Saguenay River
- List of rivers of Quebec
