= Bras de Jacob =

River in Quebec, Canada

- Location within Quebec

Location
- Country: Canada
- Province: Quebec
- Region: Saguenay-Lac-Saint-Jean
- Regional County Municipality: Le Fjord-du-Saguenay Regional County Municipality
- Unorganized territory and a city: Lac-Ministuk, Saguenay

Physical characteristics
- Source: Lac Jacob
  - location: Lac-Ministuk
  - coordinates: 48.24162°N 71.19271°W
  - elevation: 307 m (1,007 ft)
- Mouth: rivière du Moulin
  - location: Saguenay
  - coordinates: 48.23194°N 71.10056°W
  - elevation: 220 m (720 ft)
- Length: 9.0 km (5.6 mi)
- Discharge
  - location: Saguenay

Basin features
- Tributaries
  - left: (from the mouth) Discharge of lac Desgagné.
  - right: (from the mouth) Bras Henriette, discharge of lac Le Étangs, discharge of lac Cami, bras de Jacob West.

The bras de Jacob (English: Jacob's arm) is a tributary of the rivière du Moulin, flowing successively in the Saguenay, then in the territory not organized from Lac-Ministuk, in the Le Fjord-du-Saguenay Regional County Municipality, in the administrative region of Saguenay–Lac-Saint-Jean, in the province of Quebec, in Canada. The course of bras de Jacob crosses the northwest part of the zec Mars-Moulin.

The upper part of this small valley is served by the Lac-du-Bois-Joli road which passes on the north shore of Lac Jacob. A few other secondary forest roads serve the valley of the Jacob's arm, mainly for forestry and recreational tourism activities.

Forestry is the main economic activity in this valley; recreational tourism, second.

The surface of Jacob's arm is usually frozen from the beginning of December to the end of March, however the safe circulation on the ice is generally done from mid-December to mid-March.

== Geography ==
The main watersheds neighboring of bras de Jacob are:

- north side: Desgagné lake, Côté lake, William lake brook, rivière du Moulin, Chicoutimi River, Saguenay River;
- east side: rivière du Moulin, bras des Mouches, la Petite Décharge, rivière à Mars;
- south side: bras de Jacob Ouest, rivière du Moulin, Bras Henriette, Grand Lac, Sec stream;
- west side: bras de Jacob Ouest, Simoncouche River, Simoncouche Lake, Des Îlets lake, Dépôt lake, Cyriac River, Chicoutimi River.

The bras de Jacob rises at the mouth of Lake Jacob (length: 0.9 km (0.56 mi); altitude: 307 m (1,007 ft)) in the forest area. This lake is fed by the outlet (coming from the northeast) from Fournier lake, and the outlet (coming from the west) from an unidentified lake. This source is located at:

- 4.5 km (2.8 mi) east of route 175;
- 6.0 km (3.7 mi) south-east of the confluence of the Simoncouche River and Kenogami Lake;
- 9.4 km (5.8 mi) south-west of the village of Laterrière;
- 6.9 km (4.3 mi) south-west of the confluence of bras de Jacob and rivière du Moulin;
- 5.9 km (3.7 mi) south-east of the Portage-des-Roches dam, erected at the head of the Chicoutimi River;
- 24.1 km (15.0 mi) south of the confluence of the rivière du Moulin and the Saguenay River in the Chicoutimi sector of the city of Saguenay.

From its source, Jacob's arm flows over 9.0 km (5.6 mi) with a drop of 87 m (285 ft) entirely in the forest zone, according to the following segments:

- 5.0 km (3.1 mi) to the east by collecting the discharge (coming from the south) from Cami Lake, then by forming two curves towards the south, up to a bend in the river, corresponding to the discharge (coming from the east) of Lac Desgagné;
- 1.6 km (0.99 mi) towards the south-east, collecting a discharge (coming from the south-east) from a small lake, then bending towards the east, up to bras Henriette (coming from the southwest);
- 2.4 km (1.5 mi) towards the northeast curving towards the east, to its mouth.

Jacob's arm spills out onto the west bank of rivière du Moulin. This confluence is located at:

- 2.2 km (1.4 mi) east of Desgagné Lake;
- 8.2 km (5.1 mi) west of the course of the rivière à Mars;
- 10.7 km (6.6 mi) north-east of Simoncouche River;
- 12.0 km (7.5 mi) south-east of the barrage de Portage-des-Roches at the head of the Chicoutimi River;
- 22.8 km (14.2 mi) south-west of the confluence of the rivière du Moulin and the Saguenay River;
- 21.9 km (13.6 mi) south-east of downtown Saguenay.

From the mouth of "Bras de Jacob", the current successively follows the course of the rivière du Moulin on 37.6 km (23.4 mi) towards the north, then the course from the Saguenay River on 126.1 km (78.4 mi) eastwards to Tadoussac where it merges with the Saint Lawrence Estuary.

== Toponymy ==
The toponym "bras de Jacob" was formalized on December 5, 1968, at the Place Names Bank of the Commission de toponymie du Québec.

== See also ==
- Saguenay
- Le Fjord-du-Saguenay Regional County Municipality
- Lac-Ministuk, a TNO
- Zec Mars-Moulin, a ZEC
- Bras de Jacob Ouest
- Bras Henriette
- Rivière du Moulin
- Saguenay River
- List of rivers of Quebec
