= Rivière à Benjamin =

- Location within Quebec

Location
- Country: Canada
- Province: Quebec
- Region: Saguenay-Lac-Saint-Jean
- Regional County Municipality: Le Fjord-du-Saguenay Regional County Municipality
- City: Saguenay

Physical characteristics
- Source: Mountain streams
  - location: Saguenay
  - coordinates: 48.38665°N 70.90290°W
  - elevation: 92 m (302 ft)
- Mouth: Baie des Ha! Ha!
  - location: Saguenay (sector "La Baie"
  - coordinates: 48.35695°N 70.86916°W
  - elevation: 4 m (13 ft)
- Length: 5.7 km (3.5 mi)
- Discharge
  - location: Saguenay (sector "La Baie")

The Rivière à Benjamin is a tributary of the Baie des Ha! Ha!, flowing in the territory of the city of Saguenay, in the administrative region of Saguenay–Lac-Saint-Jean, in the province of Quebec, in Canada.

This small valley is served by the Anse-à-Benjamin road (east side of the river) and Saint-Joseph road (west side), for forestry, agriculture, recreation and tourist activities and for residents of this area.

Forestry is the main economic activity in this valley; recreational tourism, second.

The surface of the Benjamin River is usually frozen from early December to late March, however safe circulation on the ice is generally from mid-December to mid-March.

== Geography ==
The main neighboring river basins at Benjamin are:

- north side: Saguenay River, Tremblay Creek;
- east side: Saguenay River, Anse à Poulette stream, Rouge stream;
- south side: Baie des Ha! Ha!, Ha! Ha! River, rivière à Mars.
- west side: Philippe stream, Gauthier River, rivière du Moulin, Rivière aux Rats, Chicoutimi River.

The Benjamin river rises at the confluence of mountain streams (altitude:92 m (302 ft)). This source is located at:

- 3.4 km (2.1 mi) south of the south shore of the Saguenay River;
- 11.4 km (7.1 mi) from the end of the Cap-Ouest, the west bank of the Saguenay River;
- 3.8 km (2.4 mi) north-west of the confluence of Rivière à Benjamin and Baie des Ha! Ha!;
- 5.7 km (3.5 mi) south-east of the confluence of the rivière à Mars and the Baie des Ha! Ha!.

From its source, Rivière à Benjamin flows over 5.7 km (3.5 mi) with a drop of 88 km (55 mi) entirely in the forest zone, according to the following segments:

- 0.7 km (0.43 mi) south-west to a bend where the course branches north-east, to a bend corresponding to the Étangs stream (coming from the north-west);
- 1.5 km (0.93 mi) south-east, up to the outlet of the Red stream (coming from the north-west);
- 3.2 km (2.0 mi) south-east, to a road bridge;
- 0.34 km (0.21 mi) south-east, to its mouth.

Rivière à Benjamin pours into the bottom of "Anse à Benjamin" on the northwest shore of Baie des Ha! Ha!, in the Bagotville area. This confluence is located at:

- 16.1 km (10.0 mi) east of downtown Saguenay city;
- 8.6 km (5.3 mi) south-east of Bagotville Airport terminal;
- 4.7 km (2.9 mi) north-west of the mouth of the Ha! Ha! River;
- 2.3 km (1.4 mi) north-west of the confluence of the Mars river and the Baie des Ha! Ha!.

From the confluence of the Benjamin river with the Baie des Ha! Ha!, the current crosses this bay on 11.0 km (6.8 mi) to the northeast, then the course of the Saguenay River on 99.5 km (61.8 mi) east to Tadoussac where it merges with the Saint Lawrence Estuary.

== Toponymy ==
The term "Benjamin" is a French first name.

The toponym “Rivière à Benjamin” was formalized on August 28, 1980, at the Place Names Bank of the Commission de toponymie du Québec.

== Appendices ==
=== Related articles ===
- Saguenay, a city
- Baie des Ha! Ha!
- Saguenay River
- List of rivers of Quebec
