= Lac de l'Enfer (Lac-Pikauba) =

- Location in Quebec
- Location: Lac-Pikauba
- Coordinates: 47.98306°N 71.07833°W
- Lake type: Natural
- Primary inflows: Décharge du lac Lucifer et par le bras de l'Enfer.
- Primary outflows: Bras de l'Enfer
- Basin countries: Canada
- Max. length: 2.0 km (1.2 mi)
- Max. width: 0.7 km (0.43 mi)
- Surface elevation: 853 m (2,799 ft)

The Lac de l'Enfer is a body of water in the watershed of the Rivière à Mars and the Saguenay River. Lac de l'Enfer is located in the unorganized territory of Lac-Pikauba, in the MRC of Charlevoix Regional County Municipality, in the administrative region of Capitale-Nationale, in the province of Quebec, in Canada. Lac de l'Enfer is located in the northern part of the Laurentides Wildlife Reserve.

The watershed of Lac de l'Enfer is mainly served indirectly by the forest road R0287 which runs on the southwest side along a higher segment of the rivière du Moulin. This last road connects north to route 175 which connects the city of Quebec (city) to Saguenay (city). Some other secondary forest roads serve the sector for forestry and recreational tourism activities.

Forestry is the main economic activity in the sector; recreational tourism, second.

The surface of Lac de l'Enfer is usually frozen from the beginning of December to the end of March, however safe circulation on the ice is generally done from mid-December to mid-March.

== Geography ==
The main watersheds near Lac de l'Enfer are:

- north side: Bras de l'Enfer, Conscrits stream, rivière à Mars, Bras Sec, lac Georges;
- east side: Georges lake, rivière à Mars, Lake Ha! Ha!, Ha! Ha! River;
- south side: rivière du Moulin, Cyriac River, Pikauba Lake, Lac Decoigne;
- west side: rivière du Moulin, Cyriac River, Vermette stream, Petite rivière Pikauba.

Hell Lake has a length of 2.0 km (1.2 mi), a width of 0.7 km (0.43 mi) and an altitude of 853 m (2,799 ft). This lake is located in the Laurentides Wildlife Reserve in the massif of Laurentian Mountains. This lake has a peninsula attached to the southeast shore stretching for 0.6 km (0.37 mi) towards the center of the lake. This lake is mainly fed by the outlet (coming from the north) of Lake Lucifer and by the Bras de l'Enfer. The mouth of this lake is located at:

- 1.2 km (0.75 mi) southwest of Lac Georges;
- 2.1 km (1.3 mi) northeast of the course of the rivière du Moulin;
- 2.2 km (1.4 mi) north-east of the forest road R0287;
- 3.0 km (1.9 mi) south-west of the summit (altitude: 1,030 km (640 mi)) of Mont des Conscrits;
- 6.9 km (4.3 mi) south-west of the confluence of the Bras de l'Enfer and the rivière à Mars;
- 8.5 km (5.3 mi) northeast of the course of the Cyriac River;
- 18.5 km (11.5 mi) southwest of Lake Ha! Ha!.

From the mouth of the Lac de l'Enfer, the current successively follows the course of the Arm of Hell on 13.4 km (8.3 mi) generally towards the north, then towards the east, the course of the rivière à Mars on 55.3 km (34.4 mi) generally north and the course of the Saguenay river on 126.1 km (78.4 mi) east to Tadoussac where it merges with the Saint Lawrence Estuary.

== Toponymy ==
The toponym “Lac de l'Enfer” appeared in the Dictionary of Rivers and Lakes of the Province of Quebec (1925), page 256.

The toponym "Lac de l'Enfer" was formalized on June 1, 1971, by the Commission de toponymie du Québec.
