= Lac des Pas Perdus =

Lake in Quebec, Canada

- Location in Quebec
- Location: Lac-Pikauba, Charlevoix Regional County Municipality
- Coordinates: 47.71555°N 71.07083°W
- Lake type: Natural
- Primary inflows: Discharge of lac Éperon and a stream.
- Primary outflows: Ruisseau Philippe
- Basin countries: Canada
- Max. length: 2.8 km (1.7 mi)
- Max. width: 0.6 km (0.37 mi)
- Surface elevation: 865 m (2,838 ft)

The Lac des Pas Perdus is a freshwater body in the watershed of the Pikauba River, of the Chicoutimi River (via the Kenogami Lake) and the Saguenay River. Lac des Pas Perdus is located in the unorganized territory of Lac-Pikauba, in the Charlevoix Regional County Municipality, in the administrative region of Saguenay–Lac-Saint-Jean, in the province of Quebec, in Canada. "Lac des Pas Perdus" is located in the central part of the Laurentides Wildlife Reserve.

The "Lac des Pas Perdus" watershed is mainly served indirectly by the route 175 which links the town of Quebec (city) to Saguenay (city). The "Lac des Pas Perdus" sector is served by the forest road R0360 and by a few other secondary forest roads for forestry and recreational tourism activities.

Forestry is the main economic activity in the sector; recreational tourism, second.

The surface of Pas Perdus Lake is usually frozen from the beginning of December to the end of Pikauba, however the safe circulation on the ice is generally made from mid-December to mid-Pikauba.

== Geography ==
The mouth of Lac des Pas Perdus is located approximately 2.7 kilometres (1.7 mi) northeast of the boundary of the administrative regions of Saguenay–Lac-Saint-Jean and Capitale-Nationale. The main watersheds neighboring the Pas Perdus lake are:

- north side: Lac des Bouleaux, Lac à Mars, Pikauba River, Grand Lac aux Montagnais, Lac Marchand, Lac de l'Enfer, rivière à Mars Nord-Ouest;
- east side: Great Lac des Enfers, Lac Hébert, rivière à Mars Nord-Ouest, rivière à Mars;
- south side: Philippe Lake, Philippe Creek, Jack Creek, Jacques-Cartier River, Jacques-Cartier Lake;
- west side: Philippe stream, Pikauba River, General Tremblay lake, Noir stream, Hell stream.

Lac des Pas Perdus has a length of 2.8 kilometres (1.7 mi), a maximum width of 0.6 kilometres (0.37 mi), an altitude is 865 metres (2,838 ft) and an area of . This lake has a bay stretching for 1.0 kilometre (0.62 mi) to the east where the outlet (from the north) of Lac Éperon flows; the narrowing of the lake at the entrance to this bay is formed by a peninsula attached to the north shore and another coming from the south shore.

The mouth of this lake is located on the west shore, at:

- 1.9 kilometres (1.2 mi) north-west of Lac Philippe;
- 6.8 kilometres (4.2 mi) south-east of Pikauba Lake;
- 8.9 kilometres (5.5 mi) north-east of route 175 connecting the towns of Quebec (city) and Saguenay (city);
- 10.0 kilometres (6.2 mi) south-west of the head lake of the rivière à Mars;
- 11.8 kilometres (7.3 mi) north of the course of the Jacques-Cartier River;
- 15.6 kilometres (9.7 mi) north of the head lake of the Montmorency River;
- 17.2 kilometres (10.7 mi) south-east of a bay on the south-eastern shore of Talbot Lake which is crossed by the Pikauba River;
- 17.2 kilometres (10.7 mi) south-east of the junction of roads route 175 and route 169;
- 79.2 kilometres (49.2 mi) south-east of the confluence of the Chicoutimi River and the Saguenay River, that is to the downtown of Saguenay (city).

From the mouth of "Lac des Pas Perdus", the current descends the course of:

- the outlet of Lac des Pas Perdus on 4.2 kilometres (2.6 mi) generally towards the southwest;
- Philippe stream on 10.2 kilometres (6.3 mi) generally towards the southwest;
- the Pikauba River on generally towards the north; then, Kenogami Lake on 19.1 kilometres (11.9 mi) to the east, then to the north;
- the rivière aux Sables on 12.3 kilometres (7.6 mi) towards the north;
- the Saguenay River on 151.2 kilometres (94.0 mi) eastward to Tadoussac where it merges with the Saint Lawrence estuary.

== Toponymy ==
This toponym is indicated on the draft of the map of Lac Jacques-Cartier 1959-11-04, item 45, and on the draft of Baie-Saint-Paul, 1961-06-16, item 169.

The toponym "Lac des Pas Perdus" was formalized on December 5, 1968, by the Commission de toponymie du Québec.
