= Bras Henriette =

- Location of mouth in Quebec

Location
- Country: Canada
- Province: Quebec
- Region: Saguenay-Lac-Saint-Jean
- Regional County Municipality: Le Fjord-du-Saguenay Regional County Municipality
- City: Saguenay

Physical characteristics
- Source: Lac Gilbert
  - location: Saguenay
  - coordinates: 48.21330°N 71.16301°W
  - elevation: 365 m (1,198 ft)
- Mouth: Bras de Jacob
  - location: Saguenay
  - coordinates: 48.2275°N 71.125°W
  - elevation: 280 m (920 ft)
- Length: 4.8 km (3.0 mi)
- Discharge
  - location: Saguenay

Basin features
- Tributaries
  - left: (from the mouth)
  - right: (from the mouth) .

The arm Henriette (English: Henriette's arm) is a tributary of the Bras de Jacob, flowing in the southern part of the city of Saguenay, in the administrative region of Saguenay–Lac-Saint-Jean, in the province of Quebec, in Canada. The course of the Henriette arm crosses the northwest part of the zec Mars-Moulin.

The small valley of the Bras Henriette is served by some secondary forest roads, especially for the needs of forestry and recreational tourism activities.

Forestry is the main economic activity in this valley; recreational tourism, second.

The surface of the Henriette arm is usually frozen from the beginning of December to the end of March, however the safe circulation on the ice is generally made from mid-December to mid-March.

== Geography ==
The main watersheds neighboring the Henriette arm are:

- north side: Bras de Jacob, Desgagné lake, Côté lake, William lake brook, rivière du Moulin, Chicoutimi River, Saguenay River;
- east side: rivière du Moulin, la Petite Décharge, bras des Mouches, Rivière à Mars;
- south side: rivière du Moulin, Bras Sec;
- west side: Bras de Jacob, Bras de Jacob Ouest, Gilbert lake, Simoncouche River, Simoncouche Lake, Des Îlets lake, Depot lake.

The Bras Henriette rises at the mouth of Gilbert Lake (length: 1.1 km (0.68 mi); altitude: 365 m (1,198 ft)) in a forest area in the zec Mars-Moulin. This source is located at:

- 3.3 km (2.1 mi) south-west of the confluence of the Henriette arm and the Bras de Jacob;
- 5.3 km (3.3 mi) west of the course of the rivière du Moulin;
- 6.3 km (3.9 mi) east of Simoncouche Lake;
- 9.6 km (6.0 mi) east of route 175;
- 11.0 km (6.8 mi) south of the village of Laterrière;
- 11.3 km (7.0 mi) to the south-east of the Portage-des-Roches dam, erected at the head of the Chicoutimi River.

From its source (Gibert Lake), the Henriette arm flows over 4.8 km (3.0 mi) with a drop of 85 m (279 ft) entirely in the forest zone, according to the following segments:

- 1.8 km (1.1 mi) towards the east by forming a curve towards the south, until the outlet (coming from the south-east) of the Jacques lake;
- 2.3 km (1.4 mi) north-east, crossing Les Étangs lake (length: 1.2 km (0.75 mi); altitude: 300 m (980 ft)), up to at its mouth;
- 0.7 km (0.43 mi) north, to its mouth.

The Henriette arm spills out onto the south bank of Bras de Jacob. This confluence is located at:

- 1.9 km (1.2 mi) south-west of the confluence of the Bras de Jacob and rivière du Moulin;
- 8.8 km (5.5 mi) south-east of the village of Laterrière;
- 9.6 km (6.0 mi) east of route 175;
- 17.0 km (10.6 mi) south-east of the Portage-des-Roches dam, erected at the head of the Chicoutimi River;
- 23.6 km (14.7 mi) south of the confluence of the rivière du Moulin and the Saguenay River in the Chicoutimi sector of the city of Saguenay.

From the mouth of the Henriette arm, the current successively follows the course of the Bras de Jacob on 2.4 km (1.5 mi) towards the east, the course of the Rivière du Moulin on 37.6 km (23.4 mi) to the north, then the course of the Saguenay River on 126.1 km (78.4 mi) east to Tadoussac where it merges with the Saint Lawrence Estuary.

== Toponymy ==
The term "Henriette" is a family name of French origin.

The toponym "bras Henriette" was formalized on June 29, 1983, at the Place Names Bank of the Commission de toponymie du Québec.

== Appendices ==
=== Related articles ===
- Saguenay
- Zec Mars-Moulin, a controlled harvesting zone
- Bras de Jacob
- Rivière du Moulin
- Saguenay River
- List of rivers of Quebec
