= La Grosse Décharge =

- Location within Quebec

Location
- Country: Canada
- Province: Quebec
- Region: Saguenay-Lac-Saint-Jean
- Regional County Municipality: Le Fjord-du-Saguenay Regional County Municipality
- Unorganized territory: Lac-Ministuk

Physical characteristics
- Source: Lac de la Grosse Décharge
  - location: Lac-Ministuk
  - coordinates: 48.27329°N 71.08079°W
  - elevation: 239 m (784 ft)
- Mouth: Rivière à Mars
  - location: Lac-Ministuk
  - coordinates: 48.27583°N 70.97388°W
  - elevation: 170 m (560 ft)
- Length: 9.8 km (6.1 mi)
- Discharge
  - location: Lac-Ministuk

Basin features
- Tributaries
  - left: (from the mouth) Discharge of "lac aux Bleuets", discharge of lac Hamel.
  - right: (from the mouth) La Petite Décharge, discharge of lac Xavier.

La Grosse Décharge is a tributary of the rivière à Mars, flowing in the unorganized territory of Lac-Ministuk, in the Le Fjord-du-Saguenay Regional County Municipality, in the administrative region of Saguenay–Lac-Saint-Jean, in the province of Quebec, in Canada. The course of "La Grosse Décharge" crosses the northern part of the zec Mars-Moulin.

This small valley is served by the "Chemin de la Consol Paper" and the "Chemin des Lac des Maltais". A few other secondary forest roads serve the "La Grosse Décharge" valley, mainly for forestry and recreational tourism activities.

Forestry is the main economic activity in this valley; recreational tourism, second.

The surface of "La Grosse Décharge" is usually frozen from the beginning of December to the end of March, however the safe circulation on the ice is generally made from mid-December to mid-March.

== Geography ==
The main neighboring watersheds of La Grosse Décharge are:

- north side: Lac des Maltais, Gauthier River, Paradis brook, rivière du Moulin, Saguenay River;
- east side: rivière à Mars, Lake Como, Bras du Coco, Bras Rocheux, Bras d'Hamel, Ha! Ha! River;
- south side: rivière du Moulin, Bras de Jacob, Bras Henriette;
- west side: rivière du Moulin, Pères lake, Bras Henriette.

The "La Grosse Décharge" rises at the mouth of the "Lac de la Grosse Décharge" (length: 0.6 km (0.37 mi); altitude: 239 m (784 ft)). This lake has a marsh area on the east side. The mouth of this lake is located at:

- 1.3 km (0.81 mi) northeast of the course of the rivière au Moulin;
- 5.2 km (3.2 mi) south of the hamlet Malherbe;
- 8.0 km (5.0 mi) south-west of the confluence of La Grosse Décharge and the Rivière à Mars;
- 10.5 km (6.5 mi) east of the Portage-des-Roches dam, erected at the head of the Chicoutimi River;
- 17.3 km (10.7 mi) south-east of the confluence of the rivière du Moulin and the Saguenay River in the Chicoutimi sector of the city of Saguenay.

From its source, "La Grosse Décharge" flows over 9.8 km (6.1 mi) with a drop of 69 m (226 ft) entirely in the forest zone, according to the following segments:

- 0.7 km (0.43 mi) to the west, branching north to a bend in the river;
- 3.3 km (2.1 mi) towards the northeast, in particular by crossing the Pond of the Grosse Décharge (length: 1.1 km (0.68 mi); altitude: 187 m (614 ft)), to its mouth which corresponds to the outlet (coming from the north) of Lake Hamel;
- 1.9 km (1.2 mi) north-east, crossing artificial lake (length: 0.8 km (0.50 mi); altitude: 182 m (597 ft)), up to a dike;
- 1.8 km (1.1 mi) towards the north-east crossing a small lake on 0.3 km (0.19 mi), bending towards the east, until the discharge (coming from the south-west) a stream draining in particular lakes Xavier and Colard;
- 0.24 km (0.15 mi) north-east, to the outlet of Lac aux Bleuets (coming from the west);
- 1.3 km (0.81 mi) eastwards, to the Petite Décharge (coming from the south-west);
- 0.6 km (0.37 mi) east almost straight, to its mouth.

The Grosse Décharge pours on the west bank of the rivière à Mars. This confluence is located at:

- 6.4 km (4.0 mi) southwest of the course of the Ha! Ha! River;
- 6.7 km (4.2 mi) south-east of the Bagotville Airport terminal;
- 9.1 km (5.7 mi) north-east of the course of the rivière du Moulin;
- 9.9 km (6.2 mi) south-west of the confluence of the rivière à Mars and the Baie des Ha! Ha!;
- 18.1 km (11.2 mi) south-east of downtown Saguenay.

From the confluence of "La Grosse Décharge" with the rivière à Mars, the current follows the course of the rivière à Mars on 14.5 km (9.0 mi) towards the northwest then towards the northeast, crosses the bay Ha! Ha! on 11.0 km (6.8 mi) towards the northeast, then the course of the Saguenay River on 99.5 km (61.8 mi) towards the east until Tadoussac where it merges with the Saint Lawrence Estuary.

== Toponymy ==
The toponym "La Grosse Décharge" was formalized on December 5, 1968, at the Place Names Bank of the Commission de toponymie du Québec.

== Appendices ==
=== Related articles ===
- Le Fjord-du-Saguenay Regional County Municipality
- Lac-Ministuk, a TNO
- Zec Mars-Moulin, a ZEC
- Rivière à Mars
- Baie des Ha! Ha!
- Saguenay River
- List of rivers of Quebec
