= Lac à Mars =

Lake in Quebec, Canada

- Location in Quebec
- Location: Lac-Pikauba
- Coordinates: 47.8125°N 71.03389°W
- Lake type: Natural
- Primary inflows: Seven small riverside streams, including discharge from Lac Moche.
- Primary outflows: Rivière à Mars North-West
- Basin countries: Canada
- Max. length: 2.3 km (1.4 mi)
- Max. width: 0.8 km (0.50 mi)
- Surface elevation: 858 m (2,815 ft)

The lac à Mars is a fresh body of water in the watershed of the rivière à Mars North-West, the rivière à Mars and the Saguenay River. This body of water is located in the unorganized territory of Lac-Pikauba, in the Charlevoix Regional County Municipality, in the administrative region of Saguenay–Lac-Saint-Jean, in the province of Quebec, in Canada. Lac à Mars is located in the central eastern part of the Laurentides Wildlife Reserve.

Upstream of the port, industrial and urban area, the rivière à Mars valley is mainly served by the Consol Paper road. The rivière à Mars North-West is served by a few other secondary forest roads for forestry and recreational tourism activities.

Forestry is the main economic activity in the sector; recreational tourism, second.

The surface of the lac à March is usually frozen from the beginning of December to the end of March, however the safe circulation on the ice is generally made from mid-December to mid-March.

== Geography ==
The mouth of Lac à Mars is located about 11.5 km (7.1 mi) northeast of the boundary of the administrative regions of Saguenay–Lac-Saint-Jean and Capitale-Nationale. The main watersheds near Lake Mars are:

- north side: Cyriac River, rivière à Mars North-West, rivière à Mars, rivière à Pierre, ruisseau au Goéland;
- east side: rivière à Mars, Raymond lake, Vents lake, Chemin des Canots River;
- south side: Lac des Pas Perdus, Bouleaux lake, Pas Perdus lake, Grand lac des Enfers, Philippe stream, Chicoutimi River;
- west side: Pikauba Lake, Davis lake, Fortier lake, Claveau brook, Noir brook, Apica River.

Lac à Mars has a length of 2.3 km (1.4 mi) in the shape of a woman's head seen in semi-profile, a maximum width of 0.8 km (0.50 mi), an altitude is 858 km (533 mi) and an area of . This lake has a narrow bay stretching 0.17 km (0.11 mi) to the east. It also has a narrowing to 0.34 km (0.21 mi) in its southern part. A peninsula attached to the eastern shore stretching on 0.15 km (0.093 mi) in the shape of a hook causes another narrowing in the northern part of the lake. The mouth of this lake is located at the bottom of a bay on the north shore, at:

- 1.5 km (0.93 mi) east of a mountain peak reaching 1,080 m (3,540 ft);
- 3.7 km (2.3 mi) north of Lac des Bouleaux;
- 7.3 km (4.5 mi) west of the course of the rivière à Mars;
- 5.5 km (3.4 mi) east of a bay on Pikauba Lake;
- 17.2 km (10.7 mi) south of the confluence of the rivière à Mars North-West and the rivière à Mars;
- 67.0 km (41.6 mi) south-east of downtown Saguenay (city).

From the confluence of the lac à Mars, the current descends the course of:

- the rivière à Mars North-West on 26.6 km (16.5 mi) generally towards the north;
- the rivière à Mars on 66.0 km (41.0 mi) generally towards the north;
- the Baie des Ha! Ha! on 11 km (6.8 mi) towards the northeast;
- the Saguenay River on 99.5 km (61.8 mi) eastwards to Tadoussac where it merges with the Saint Lawrence estuary.

== Toponymy ==
The place names “Rivière à Mars”, “Rivière à Mars Nord-Ouest” and “Lac à Mars” have the same origin.

The toponym "lac à Mars" was formalized on December 5, 1968, by the Commission de toponymie du Québec.
