= Bras de l'Enfer (rivière à Mars) =

River in Quebec, Canada

- Location within Quebec

Location
- Country: Canada
- Province: Quebec
- Region: Saguenay–Lac-Saint-Jean
- Regional County Municipality: Le Fjord-du-Saguenay Regional County Municipality
- Unorganized territory: Lac-Ministuk

Physical characteristics
- Source: Lac Tréma
  - location: Lac-Ministuk
  - coordinates: 47.96070°N 71.04362°W
  - elevation: 897 m (2,943 ft)
- Mouth: Rivière à Mars
  - location: Lac-Ministuk
  - coordinates: 48.02611°N 71.01028°W
  - elevation: 440 m (1,440 ft)
- Length: 18.6 km (11.6 mi)
- Discharge
  - location: Lac-Ministuk

Basin features
- Tributaries
  - right: (from the mouth) Unidentied stream, discharge of lac Georges, discharge of lac Lucifer (via lac de l'Enfer).

The Bras de l'Enfer is a tributary of the rivière à Mars, flowing in the unorganized territory of Lac-Ministuk, in the Le Fjord-du-Saguenay Regional County Municipality, in the administrative region of Saguenay–Lac-Saint-Jean, in the province of Quebec, in Canada. The upper part of the course of the "Bras de l'Enfer" crosses the northern part of the Laurentides Wildlife Reserve.

A few other secondary forest roads serve the Bras de l'Enfer valley, mainly for forestry and recreational tourism activities.

Forestry is the main economic activity in this valley; recreational tourism, second.

The surface of the Bras de l'Enfer is usually frozen from the beginning of December to the end of March, however the safe circulation on the ice is generally made from mid-December to mid-March.

== Geography ==
The Bras de l'Enfer rises at the mouth of Lake Trema (length: 0.15 km (0.093 mi); altitude: 897 m (2,943 ft)). This source is located at:

- 3.7 km (2.3 mi) north-east of "Lac du Moulin" which is the head lake of rivière du Moulin;
- 3.9 km (2.4 mi) west of the course of the rivière à Mars;
- 7.7 km (4.8 mi) south of the confluence of the Arm of Hell and the rivière à Mars;
- 7.2 km (4.5 mi) northwest of Lac Marchand;
- 16.8 km (10.4 mi) south-west of Lake Ha! Ha!.

From its source, the Bras de l'Enfer flows over 18.6 km (11.6 mi) with a drop of 457 m (1,499 ft) entirely in forest and mountainous zones, according to the following segments:

- 2.0 km (1.2 mi) to the west, in particular by crossing Gilson lake (length: 0.4 km (0.25 mi); altitude: ) and Villeneuve lake (length: 0.8 km (0.50 mi); altitude: 891 km (554 mi)), the south-eastern part of which is surrounded by marshes, to the mouth of the latter;
- 3.2 km (2.0 mi) towards the north-west, crossing lac de l'Enfer (length: 2.0 km (1.2 mi); altitude: 853 m (2,799 ft)), to its mouth;
- 3.5 km (2.2 mi) north-east to a bend in the river, then branching north-east to the outlet (coming from the south-east) of Lake Georges;
- 3.9 km (2.4 mi) towards the north-east by leveling 165 m (541 ft) and bypassing by the northeast a mountain whose summit reaches 934 m (3,064 ft), to a mountain stream (coming from the south);
- 1.7 km (1.1 mi) northwards, making a difference in level from 97 m (318 ft), to a stream (coming from the west);
- 4.3 km (2.7 mi) towards the south-east by forming a curve towards the north, followed by a curve towards the south, until its mouth.

The Bras de l'Enfer pours down on the east bank of the rivière à Mars. This confluence is located at:

- 4.3 km (2.7 mi) north-east of Lake Georges;
- 8.7 km (5.4 mi) north-east of a curve in the course of the rivière du Moulin;
- 8.2 km (5.1 mi) west of the course of the Rivière à Pierre;
- 5.8 km (3.6 mi) west of a mountain peak (altitude: 961 m (3,153 ft));
- 36.4 km (22.6 mi) south of the confluence of the rivière à Mars and Baie des Ha! Ha!.

From the confluence of the Bras de l'Enfer with the rivière à Mars, the current follows the course of the rivière à Mars on 55.3 km (34.4 mi) generally towards the north, crosses the Baie des Ha! Ha! on 11.0 km (6.8 mi) northeast, then the course of the Saguenay River on 99.5 km (61.8 mi) east to Tadoussac where it merges with the Saint Lawrence Estuary.

== Toponymy ==
The toponym "bras de l'Enfer" was formalized on December 5, 1968, at the Place Names Bank of the Commission de toponymie du Québec.

== See also ==
- Le Fjord-du-Saguenay Regional County Municipality
- Lac-Ministuk, a TNO
- Laurentides Wildlife Reserve
- Lac de l'Enfer
- Rivière à Mars
- Baie des Ha! Ha!
- Saguenay River
- List of rivers of Quebec
