= Gauthier River =

Gauthier River Décharge des Maltais (French)
- Location within Quebec

Location
- Country: Canada
- Province: Quebec
- Region: Saguenay-Lac-Saint-Jean
- Regional County Municipality: Le Fjord-du-Saguenay Regional County Municipality
- City: Saguenay

Physical characteristics
- Source: Lac des Maltais
  - location: Saguenay
  - coordinates: 48.29787°N 71.05344°W
  - elevation: 182 m (597 ft)
- Mouth: Saguenay River
  - location: Saguenay
  - coordinates: 48.43389°N 70.95834°W
  - elevation: 4 m (13 ft)
- Length: 23.5 km (14.6 mi)
- Discharge
  - location: Saguenay

Basin features
- Tributaries
  - left: Ruisseau des Crères
  - right: Ruisseau Paradis

The Rivière Gauthier is a tributary of the Saguenay River, flowing in the territory of the city of Saguenay (sector La Baie), in the administrative region of Saguenay–Lac-Saint-Jean, in the province of Quebec, in Canada.

This small valley is served by "Chemin du Lac-des-Maltais", Chemin Saint-Isidore (Laterrière), route 170, Chemin Saint-Roch, l'autoroute 70, chemin du Plateau Nord, boulevard Saint-Jean-Baptiste, "chemin du rang Saint-Joseph" and "chemin du rang Saint-Martin", for agriculture, forestry, recreational and tourist activities and residents of this area.

Forestry is the main economic activity in this valley; recreational tourism, second.

The surface of the Gauthier River is usually frozen from the beginning of December to the end of March, however the safe circulation on the ice is generally made from mid-December to mid-March.

== Geography ==
The main watersheds adjacent to the Gauthier river are:

- north side: Saguenay River;
- east side: Saguenay river, Saint-Martin brook, Bouchard brook, Morin brook, Maltais brook, Léo-Jean brook, Tremblay brook, rivière à Benjamin, Paradis brook, Baie des Ha! Ha!, rivière à Mars, Ha! Ha! River;
- south side: Frenière River, La Grosse Décharge, rivière du Moulin.
- west side: rivière du Moulin, rivière aux Rats, Chicoutimi River.

The Gauthier River rises at the mouth of Lac des Maltais (length: 1.2 km (0.75 mi); altitude: 182 m (597 ft)) in agricultural areas. This source is located at:

- 2.3 km (1.4 mi) south-east of the center of the hamlet Malherbe;
- 4.8 km (3.0 mi) south-west of a bend in the rivière à Mars;
- 6.8 km (4.2 mi) south-west of Bagotville Airport terminal;
- 11.8 km (7.3 mi) to the southwest
- 14.1 km (8.8 mi) south-east of downtown Saguenay;
- 14.1 km (8.8 mi) south-west of the confluence of the rivière à Mars and the Baie des Ha! Ha!.

From its source, the Gauthier river flows over 23.5 km (14.6 mi) with a drop of 178 m (584 ft) especially in agricultural area, according to the following segments:

- 2.0 km (1.2 mi) to the north by crossing the Lac-des-Maltais road as well as the mid-segment railway, and forming a curve towards the west, as well as crossing the Roger-Pedneault Lake (length: 0.3 km (0.19 mi); altitude: 152 km (94 mi)). Note: this body of water receives from the southeast the discharge from the Frenière River;
- 4.6 km (2.9 mi) northwards passing west of Bagotville Airport, crossing Saint-Isidore (Laterrière) road (north-south direction) and bending towards west to route 170;
- 3.4 km (2.1 mi) towards the northeast by crossing the autoroute 70, up to the railroad (east-west direction) that the river cuts at 0.2 km (0.12 mi) of "Chemin du Plateau Nord", on the northwest side of the center of the village of Saint-Louis-de-Bagot;
- 4.7 km (2.9 mi) towards the north by forming a curve towards the east at the start of the segment, up to the route 372 (boulevard Saint-Jean-Baptiste) that the current cuts east of a village;
- 2.5 km (1.6 mi) towards the northwest by winding up to the Crères stream (coming from the southwest);
- 2.8 km (1.7 mi) meandering northwest, then north, to a bridge on rang Saint-Joseph road;
- 1.0 km (0.62 mi) north-east, up to the outlet of the Paradis brook (coming from the south-east);
- 2.3 km (1.4 mi) to the north by forming a few serpentines in the middle of the segment, then by bending towards the northeast to the bridge on chemin du rang Saint-Martin;
- 0.24 km (0.15 mi) north-east, to its mouth.

The Gauthier River flows into the bottom of a small bay of 0.14 km (0.087 mi) on the south bank of the Saguenay River (Battures aux Loups Marins), in the sector of La Baie, either on the west of "Pointe à Gonie". This confluence is located at:

- 2.6 km (1.6 mi) of the north bank of the Saguenay River (at a height between the rivière à la Loutre and rivière aux Outardes);
- 8.1 km (5.0 mi) north-east of downtown Saguenay;
- 11.0 km (6.8 mi) north of the Bagotville Airport terminal;
- 12.2 km (7.6 mi) north-west of the confluence of the rivière à Mars and the Baie des Ha! Ha!
- 14.8 km (9.2 mi) north-west of the mouth of the Ha! Ha! River.

From the confluence of the Gauthier river with the Saguenay River, the current follows the course of the Saguenay River on 119.4 km (74.2 mi) eastward to Tadoussac where it merges with the Saint Lawrence Estuary.

== Toponymy ==
The term "Gauthier" is a family name of French origin.

The toponym "Rivière Gauthier" was formalized on December 5, 1968, at the Place Names Bank of the Commission de toponymie du Québec.

== Appendices ==
=== Related articles ===
- Saguenay, a city
- Saguenay River
- List of rivers of Quebec
