= Rivière à Mars North-West =

- Location within Quebec

Location
- Country: Canada
- Province: Quebec
- Region: Capitale-Nationale
- Regional County Municipality: Charlevoix Regional County Municipality
- Unorganized territory: Lac-Pikauba

Physical characteristics
- Source: Lac à Mars
  - location: Lac-Pikauba
  - coordinates: 47.82921°N 71.0468°W
  - elevation: 858 m (2,815 ft)
- Mouth: Rivière à Mars
  - location: Lac-Pikauba
  - coordinates: 47.97194°N 70.96722°W
  - elevation: 579 m (1,900 ft)
- Length: 26.6 km (16.5 mi)
- Discharge
  - location: Lac-Pikauba

Basin features
- Tributaries
  - left: (from the mouth) Discharge of "lac des Écores", unidentified stream, discharge of lac Marchand, discharge of "Petit lac Cloc-Cloc" and of "lac Cloc-Cloc".
  - right: (from the mouth) Unidentied stream, discharge of lac Potvin.

The Rivière à Mars Nord-Ouest is a tributary of the rivière à Mars flowing in the unorganized territory of Lac-Pikauba, in the Charlevoix Regional County Municipality, in the administrative region of Capitale-Nationale, in the province of Quebec, Canada. The "rivière à Mars North-West" crosses the central-western part of the Laurentides Wildlife Reserve.

Upstream of the port, industrial and urban area, the "rivière à Mars" valley is mainly served by the "Consol Paper road". The "rivière à Mars North West" is served by a few other secondary forest roads for forestry and recreational tourism activities.

Forestry is the main economic activity in this valley; recreational tourism, second.

The surface of the "rivière à Mars North-West" is usually frozen from the beginning of December to the end of March, however the safe circulation on the ice is generally made from mid-December to mid-March.

== Geography ==
The main watersheds adjacent to the "rivière à Mars North-West" are:

- north side: rivière à Mars, rivière à Pierre, Lake Ha! Ha!;
- east side: rivière à Mars, Goéland lake, Stymphale lake, Goéland stream, Colon lake;
- south side: Lac à Mars, "Lac des Bouleaux", "Lac des Pas Perdus", "Grand lac des Enfers", Creek Philippe;
- west side: Pikauba Lake, Cyriac River, Marchand lake, rivière du Moulin, Hell lake, Georges lake.

The "rivière à Mars North-West" rises at the mouth of lac à Mars (length: 2.3 km (1.4 mi); altitude: 858 m (2,815 ft)) in the Laurentides Wildlife Reserve. This source is located at:

- 1.5 km (0.93 mi) east of a mountain peak reaching 1,080 m (3,540 ft);
- 3.7 km (2.3 mi) north of "Lac des Bouleaux";
- 7.3 km (4.5 mi) west of the course of the rivière à Mars;
- 5.5 km (3.4 mi) east of a bay on Pikauba Lake;
- 17.2 km (10.7 mi) south of the confluence of the northwest Mars river and the rivière à Mars.

From its source, the "rivière à Mars North-West" flows on 26.6 km (16.5 mi) generally towards the north, with a drop of 279 m (915 ft) entirely in the forest zone, according to the segments following:

- 2.4 km (1.5 mi) northward, to the outlet (coming from the northwest) of "Lac Cloc-Cloc" and "Petit Lac Cloc-Cloc";
- 3.5 km (2.2 mi) north to the outlet (coming from the south-east) of Lake Potvin;
- 2.4 km (1.5 mi) north to the outlet (coming from the west) of Lac Marchand;
- 5.5 km (3.4 mi) towards the north, winding up to the stream (coming from the south-east);
- 4.0 km (2.5 mi) towards the north, collecting at the beginning of the segment (i.e. a hundred meters downstream) a stream (coming from the northwest), then the northeast, by unevening 82 m (269 ft) and meandering to the outlet of Lac des Écores (coming from the northwest);
- 6.3 km (3.9 mi) first towards the north-east to a bend in the river, then on 2.3 km (1.4 mi) towards the south-east by winding up to a stream ( coming from the west);
- 2.5 km (1.6 mi) by winding towards the northeast, then towards the east by collecting a stream (coming from the south), to its mouth.

The "rivière à Mars North-West" flows in a river loop on the west bank of the rivière à Mars. This confluence is located at:

- 7.8 km (4.8 mi) northeast of "Lac de l'Enfer";
- 6.5 km (4.0 mi) north-west of Lake Cinto;
- 10.1 km (6.3 mi) north of Lac Marchand;
- 11.4 km (7.1 mi) south-west of Lake Ha! Ha!;
- 40.3 km (25.0 mi) south-east of Kenogami Lake;
- 41.7 km (25.9 mi) south of the confluence of the rivière à Mars and Baie des Ha! Ha!;
- 50.2 km (31.2 mi) south-east of downtown Saguenay (city).

From the confluence of the "rivière à Mars North-West", the current descends the course of the rivière à Mars on 66.0 km (41.0 mi) generally towards the north, crosses the Baie des Ha! Ha! on 11.0 km (6.8 mi) northeast, then follows the course of the Saguenay River on 99.5 km (61.8 mi) east to Tadoussac where it merges with the Saint Lawrence Estuary.

== Toponymy ==
The toponym “Rivière à Mars Nord-Ouest” is associated with its tributary “Rivière à Mars”. These two names evoke the first pioneer Mars Simard to settle around the 1870s near the rivière à Mars, on the Baie des Ha! Ha!. The toponym “Rivière à Mars Nord-Ouest” appeared on the draft map of Lac Pikauba, 1961-09-15, item 75 and on the draft map of Baie-St-Paul, 1961-06-30, item 251.

The toponym "Rivière à Mars Nord-Ouest" was formalized on December 5, 1968, at the Place Names Bank of the Commission de toponymie du Québec.

=== See also ===
- List of rivers of Quebec
