= Bras du Coco =

Stream in Saguenay, Quebec, Canada

- Location within Quebec

Location
- Country: Canada
- Province: Quebec
- Region: Saguenay-Lac-Saint-Jean
- Regional County Municipality: Le Fjord-du-Saguenay Regional County Municipality
- Municipality and Unorganized territory: Ferland-et-Boilleau and Lac-Ministuk

Physical characteristics
- Source: Lac Croche
  - location: Ferland-et-Boilleau
  - coordinates: 48.14300°N 70.95390°W
  - elevation: 357 m (1,171 ft)
- Mouth: Rivière à Mars
  - location: Lac-Ministuk
  - coordinates: 48.20722°N 70.94305°W
  - elevation: 230 m (750 ft)
- Length: 11.8 km (7.3 mi)
- Discharge
  - location: Lac-Ministuk

Basin features
- Tributaries
  - left: (from the mouth) Discharge of "Lac des Belles Filles", discharge of lac Jerry.
  - right: Discharge of "Petit lac Pacifique".

The arm of the Coco is a tributary of the rivière à Mars, flowing in the unorganized territory of Lac-Ministuk, in the Le Fjord-du-Saguenay Regional County Municipality, in the administrative region of Saguenay–Lac-Saint-Jean, in the province of Quebec, in Canada.

A few other secondary forest roads serve the Coco Valley, especially for forestry and recreational tourism activities.

Forestry is the main economic activity in this valley; recreational tourism, second.

The surface of the "Bras du Coco" is usually frozen from the beginning of December to the end of March, however the safe circulation on the ice is generally done from mid-December to mid-March.

== Geography ==
The "Bras du Coco" rises at the mouth of Lac Croche (length: 1.9 km (1.2 mi); altitude: 357 m (1,171 ft)) which is located at the southwestern limit of the municipality Ferland-et-Boilleau. This source is located at:

- 6.5 km (4.0 mi) north-east of the course of the rivière du Moulin;
- 7.2 km (4.5 mi) south-east of the confluence of the Coco arm and the rivière à Mars;
- 8.9 km (5.5 mi) east of the hamlet "Secteur-Charlevoix" located on the edge of the rivière du Moulin;
- 25.6 km (15.9 mi) south-east of Kenogami Lake.

The "Bras du Coco" flows over 11.8 km (7.3 mi) with a drop of 127 m (417 ft) especially in the forest zone, according to the following segments:

- 1.6 km (0.99 mi) to the east, crossing two small marsh areas, to the outlet (coming from the south-east) of two lakes;
- 1.3 km (0.81 mi) north-east to the outlet (coming from the south-east) of Little Pacific Lake;
- 1.1 km (0.68 mi) north-west to the outlet (coming from the south-west) of Lac Jerry;
- 5.0 km (3.1 mi) towards the northwest by forming a hook of 0.4 km (0.25 mi) towards the northeast, then north passing between two mountains, until the discharge (from the southwest) from "Lac des Belles Filles";
- 2.3 km (1.4 mi) north-west in the marsh area, to a stream (coming from the south-west);
- 0.5 km (0.31 mi) north in the marsh area, to its mouth.

The "Bras du Coco" pours into a bend on the south bank of the rivière à Mars. This confluence is located at:

- 3.4 km (2.1 mi) west of the Bras Rocheux river, a tributary of the Ha! Ha! River;
- 7.7 km (4.8 mi) west of the hamlet "Ferland" on the edge of Bras d'Hamel;
- 8.5 km (5.3 mi) south-west of a curve in the course of the Ha! Ha! River;
- 10.1 km (6.3 mi) north-east of the hamlet “Sector-Charlevoix” located on the edge of the rivière du Moulin;
- 15.6 km (9.7 mi) south of the confluence of the rivière à Mars and the Baie des Ha! Ha!.

From the confluence of the "Bras du Coco" with the rivière à Mars, the current follows the course of the rivière à Mars on 23.0 km (14.3 mi) generally towards the north, crosses the Baie des Ha! Ha! northeast on 11.0 km (6.8 mi), then the course of the Saguenay River east on 99.5 km (61.8 mi) to Tadoussac where it merges with the Saint Lawrence estuary.

== Toponymy ==
The toponym "bras du Coco" was formalized on December 5, 1968, at the Place Names Bank of the Commission de toponymie du Québec.

== See also ==
- Le Fjord-du-Saguenay Regional County Municipality
- Lac-Ministuk, a TNO
- Ferland-et-Boilleau, a municipality
- Zec de la Rivière-à-Mars, a controlled harvesting zone
- Zec Mars-Moulin, a controlled harvesting zone
- Rivière à Mars
- Baie des Ha! Ha!
- Saguenay River
- List of rivers of Quebec
