= Zec de la Rivière-à-Mars =

- Location within Quebec
- Location: Canada, Quebec, Le Fjord-du-Saguenay Regional County Municipality
- Nearest city: Saguenay
- Coordinates: 48°10′00″N 71°01′19″W
- Area: Length of 44.5 kilometres (27.7 mi)
- Established: 1995

The Zec River to Mars is a "zone d'exploitation contrôlée" (controlled harvesting zone) (ZEC) in the unorganized territory of Lac-Ministuk, in the Le Fjord-du-Saguenay Regional County Municipality, in the administrative region of Saguenay-Lac-Saint-Jean, in Quebec, in Canada.

Established in 1995, the ZEC is administered since May 2008 by the non-profit organization "Contact Nature Rivière-à-Mars", whose mission is the operation of this river that runs through public lands. On May 1, 2008, the "Association des pêcheurs sportifs de la Rivière à Mars" (Association of anglers Rivière à Mars) and "Centre Plein-Air Bec-Scie inc" were merged into the new organization which was registered on May 5, 2008.

== Geography ==
The "rivière à Mars" (Mars River) is a river in the administrative region of Saguenay-Lac-Saint-Jean, which pass through the "Arrondissement La Baie" (Bay district), in Saguenay city. From its source in Lake Mars in the Laurentides Wildlife Reserve, the river flows on 106 km north to "La Baie des Ha! Ha!" which is a bay on the Saguenay River located in Le Fjord-du-Saguenay.

This salmon river was hit hard by the Saguenay floods that occurred from July 19 to 21, 1996.

== Hunting and fishing ==
Mars River has cold water, many rapids and falls, and a rocky bottom that are well suited to the Atlantic salmon for his journey from the sea to the pits of reproduction.

From 1894 to 1935, Price Brothers operated a private club for recreational fishing on the river. In 1930, construction of a dam at the "aux chutes de la passe des Murailles" (falls of the walls pass), 13 km from the mouth, was a major constraint to the salmon. This dam facilitated the floating of logs and the "drave" (log drives) that has been practiced until 1952. In 1976, a number of development work on the river was done promoting salmon pits reproduction. This work was accompanied by a seeding program which took place between 1976 and the reopening of fishing on the river in 1992.

The "Association des pêcheurs sportifs de la rivière à Mars" (APSRM) was formed in 1983 to administer the operation of the river. In 1986, the ZEC is then formed by the Government of Quebec, the same year that the construction of a fishway at kilometer 2.7. Its mandate focuses on fisheries management up to kilometer 60. In 1996 Saguenay floods occurs. Il is one of the worst natural disasters in the history of the river. The high flood waters carried almost all the facilities on the river. The strong current has transformed deeply the riverbed. In 1998, as a result of this disaster, a new fishway at 12 kilometers from the mouth was done. Consequently, fish are making their ascent of the river that has its own characteristics.

The salmon fishing quotas concern two areas, sector 2 with the salmon pit 12; and sector 5 with salmon pits 39 to 42. Sectors with no quotas comprise sector 1 with 11 pits, sector 4 with 26 pits (13-38) and the ZEC sector offering three sectors pits extend from 44 to 92. Visitors to the fishway can watch salmon in transit through a special room window.

Apart the Atlantic salmon, seven major species abound in the waters of the basin of the "Mars River": the brook trout, the longnose dace, red miller, the "black suckers", the American eel, the stickleback and northern pearl dace.

== Toponymy ==
The names "Rivière à Mars" and "Lac à Mars" (formerly referred to as "Grand Lake Mars" (Great Mars Lake)) are related together. The "Mars lake" turns out to be the source of the "Mars River"; it is 5 miles east of "Pikauba lake" and 72 km south of Saguenay city. The "Mars River" goes along on much of the eastern boundary of the Zec Mars-Moulin. In sum, the names "Zec de la Rivière à Mars" and "Mars River" have their origin in the name of the lake and river. The name Zec de la Rivière-à-Mars was formalized on August 5, 1982, at the Bank of place names in the Commission de toponymie du Québec (Geographical Names Board of Quebec).
