= Pikauba Lake =

Lake in Quebec, Canada

- Location within Quebec
- Location: Lac-Pikauba, Saguenay–Lac-Saint-Jean, Quebec
- Coordinates: 47.79667°N 71.13277°W
- Type: Naturel
- Primary inflows: Four stream discharges.
- Primary outflows: Pikauba River and Cyriac River
- Basin countries: Canada
- Max. length: 10.2 km (6.3 mi)
- Max. width: 1.9 km (1.2 mi)
- Shore length^{1}: catchment
- Surface elevation: 827 m (2,713 ft)
- ^{1} Shore length is not a well-defined measure.

The Pikauba Lake is a body of water in the watershed of the Chicoutimi River (via Kenogami Lake) and the Saguenay River. Lac Pikauba is located in the unorganized territory of Lac-Pikauba, in the Charlevoix Regional County Municipality, in the administrative region from Capitale-Nationale, in the province of Quebec, in Canada. Pikauba Lake is located in the central part of the Laurentides Wildlife Reserve.

The watershed of Lake Pikauba is mainly served indirectly by the route 175 which links the city of Quebec (city) to Saguenay (city). The Northwest Pikauba River is served by a few other secondary forest roads for forestry and recreational tourism activities.

Forestry is the main economic activity in the sector; recreational tourism, second.

The surface of Lake Pikauba is usually frozen from the beginning of December to the end of Pikauba, however the safe circulation on the ice is generally made from mid-December to mid-Pikauba.

== Geography ==
The mouth of Pikauba Lake is located approximately 3.5 km (2.2 mi) northeast of the boundary of the administrative regions of Saguenay-Lac-Saint-Jean and Capitale-Nationale. The main watersheds near Lake Pikauba are:

- north side: Cyriac River, Pikauba River, Grand Lac aux Montagnais, Lac Marchand, Lac de l'Enfer, rivière à Mars Nord West;
- east side: Lac à Mars, Lac des Bouleaux, Rivière à Mars Nord-Ouest, Rivière à Mars, Chemin des Canots River, Malbaie River;
- south side: Vercheres lake, Philippe stream, Pikauba River, Jacques-Cartier Lake;
- west side: Pikauba River, Decoigne lake, Noir brook, Pikauba River, Davenport lake, Talbot Lake, Rivière aux Écorces Nord-Est.

The lake Pikauba has a length of 10.2 km (6.3 mi), a maximum width of 1.9 km (1.2 mi), an altitude is 827 km (514 mi) and an area of . This lake has a bay stretching for 1.5 km (0.93 mi) to the northwest; the first outlet (Pikauba River) to the lake is located on the southwest shore of this bay. It has a second outfall located on the north shore of another bay on the north side flowing into the Cyriac River. It also includes a bay (south side) receiving the outlet from Lake Verchères, a small bay on the east shore receiving the outlet from Lac des Bouleaux, another bay on the east shore receiving two streams.

This lake has a narrowing generating a strait of a hundred meters in width demarcating the northern part of the lake. The first outlet from this lake is located at the bottom of a bay on the north shore, at:

- 5.8 km (3.6 mi) north-east of route 175 connecting the towns of Quebec (city) and Saguenay (city);
- 6.9 km (4.3 mi) east of a bay on the southeast shore of Talbot Lake which is crossed by the Petite rivière Pikauba;
- 8.1 km (5.0 mi) south-west of Lac à Mars;
- 8.6 km (5.3 mi) south-east of the junction of roads route 175 and route 169;
- 38.3 km (23.8 mi) south-west of the dam at the mouth of Lake Ha! Ha!;
- 54.8 km (34.1 mi) south-east of Kenogami Lake;
- 70.3 km (43.7 mi) south-east of the confluence of the Chicoutimi River and the Saguenay River, that is to the downtown of Saguenay (city).

From the mouth of Lake Pikauba, the current descends the course of:

- the Pikauba River (1st outfall) on 138.8 km (86.2 mi) first towards the south, then generally towards the north; then, Kenogami Lake on 19.1 km (11.9 mi) to the east, then to the north;
- the Cyriac River (2e outfall) on 57.2 km (35.5 mi) generally towards the north; then, Kenogami Lake on 7.9 km (4.9 mi) towards the north;
- the rivière aux Sables on 12.3 km (7.6 mi) towards the north;
- the Saguenay River on 151.2 km (94.0 mi) eastward to Tadoussac where it merges with the Saint Lawrence estuary.

== Toponymy ==
The term "Pikauba" is derived from an Innu term, "opikopau", meaning "lake constricted by alders, ...". Opi is a root to indicate that something is closed or tightened. "Kopau" is an Innu ending in this indicative to designate a lake with alders, rushes and others. The map of provincial surveyor Frederic William Blaiklock from 1852 mentions the name "Chicoutimi Lake" to identify this lake. The specific "Pikauba" is used in several toponyms of the Laurentides Wildlife Reserve. Father Laure's 1731 map rather indicates “Ouapikoupau River”. According to Father Joseph-Étienne Guinard, in the Innu and Cree languages in particular, there is the “pikobaw” form that Father Laure translates from the Innu language as “tightened or masked by rushes”. Another source claims rather that "pikobaw" breaks down into "pik", meaning "menu", "kobaw", "brushwood" and "wabi", "white", giving "white brushwood" or "small brushwood". formalized in history: Grand lac Pikauba, Lac Picauba and Upikauba.

The toponym "Lac Pikauba" was formalized on December 5, 1968} by the Commission de toponymie du Québec.
