= Laterrière, Quebec =

Coordinates: 48°18′9″N 71°7′5.2″W

Laterrière (French pronunciation: [latɛʁjɛʁ]) is a community in the Saguenay–Lac-Saint-Jean region of Quebec and a former city. It is part of the merged city of Saguenay, Quebec. Laterrière was founded by Jean-Baptiste Honorat in 1846.
