= Zec Mars-Moulin =

- Location within Quebec
- Location: Le Fjord-du-Saguenay Regional County Municipality
- Nearest city: Saguenay
- Coordinates: 48°09′N 71°05′W
- Area: 805.10 square kilometres (310.85 sq mi)
- Established: 1979

The Zec Mars-Moulin is a "zone d'exploitation contrôlée" (controlled harvesting zone) of 193.5 square kilometres (74.7 sq mi), located in the unorganized territory of Lac-Kinistuk, in the Le Fjord-du-Saguenay Regional County Municipality, in the administrative region Saguenay-Lac-Saint-Jean, in Quebec, in Canada. Since inception of the zec, the main economic activities of the area are forestry and recreational activities such as fishing, hunting, camping, canoeing, kayaking...

== Geography ==
Located in the Saguenay, Zec Mars-Moulin is at distance of only 15 km south of La Baie, a sector of Saguenay City. ZEC has an area of 805.10 square kilometers. Bounded on the west and south by the Laurentides Wildlife Reserve. Zec covers townships Lapointe, Lartigue, Laterriere, Cimon, Ferland and Dubuc.

The territory of Zec Mars-Moulin turns out to be the entrance gate of the Laurentides Wildlife Reserve. Mars River, recognized as one of the salmon rivers of the region, along much of the eastern boundary of the ZEC, to La Baie.

Major lakes of Zec are (mainly French names): "des Belles-Filles", Cami, aux Castors, "de la Chaine", Côme, Creux, des Culottes, Desgagné, des Éclats, Gatelier, Gilbert, à Gilles, Grand lac Castule, de la Grosse Décharge, de la Grosse Roche, Isaïe, Jerry, Lanz, des Mouches, des Perches, aux Rats Musqués, de la Savane, Travers, à la Tripe, Tremblay, des Uries, Vert and Vénus. The main rivers are: à Mars, du Moulin and "Bras sec". Annually, the surface water bodies is generally frozen from November to April.

The "Montagne de la tour" (Mountain Tower), located in the center of the ZEC, reached 456 m. While the "Montagne du Four", located about 2 km east of the territory of the ZEC, reached 702 m.

The journey to reach the entrance station of Zec is:

- Entrance station of "La Baie": take Highway 170 towards La Baie. Early in the zone 50 km/h, turn right on Avenue du Port. After 600 meters turn right onto Falls. Go straight to the "Outdoor Centre Becscie"; this will take you directly to the entrance station.
- Entrance station of Laterrière: In the town of Laterrière, take the path of 4 miles that runs behind the smelter. Continue straight (the road runs along the Moulin River) to arrive directly at the reception station.
- Alternate entrance station: at km 211 of Highway 175 between Saguenay and Quebec City.

In Zec, quad biking is another popular activity in summer. The extensive network of logging roads passable by mountain bike is connected to organized trails.

In the ZEC Mars-Martin the water bodies (93 lakes and several rivers) cover 1,020 hectares (2.5% of the territory of 404 square kilometers). The road network of 537 km which is passable for bikes is open to trucks over much of the territory. In 2014, the ZEC has 455 members, thirty caravans on the land and 155 vacation leases.

== Hunting and fishing ==
The area is best known for the quality of moose hunting that is practiced there. Located in the area of "sapinière" (fir) and yellow birch, this territory offers a habitat of ideal quality for moose. Hunting statistics of hunters practicing in the zec confirm it.

On the territory of the ZEC, fishing is limited by quotas. Fishing for the brook trout is practiced with fly technic on the Mars River.

== Toponymy ==
The name of Mars River and Mill River which are crossing the territory of the ZEC, are directly related to the choice of the toponym of the Zec.

The name "Zec Mars-Moulin" was recorded on August 5, 1982 at the Bank of place names in the Commission de toponymie du Québec (Geographical Names Board of Canada).

== See also ==
=== Related articles ===
- L'Anse-Saint-Jean, municipality
- Saguenay River
- Zec de la Rivière-à-Mars
- Le Fjord-du-Saguenay Regional County Municipality
- Saguenay-Lac-Saint-Jean, an administrative zone of Quebec
- Parc national du Fjord-du-Saguenay
- Zone d'exploitation contrôlée (Controlled Harvesting Zone) (ZEC)

== Attachments ==
=== External links ===
- Official website of Zec Mars-Moulin.
- "Official website of the Fjord-du-Saguenay".
