= Rivière du Moulin (rivière Saguenay) =

Rivière du Moulin River of the Mill
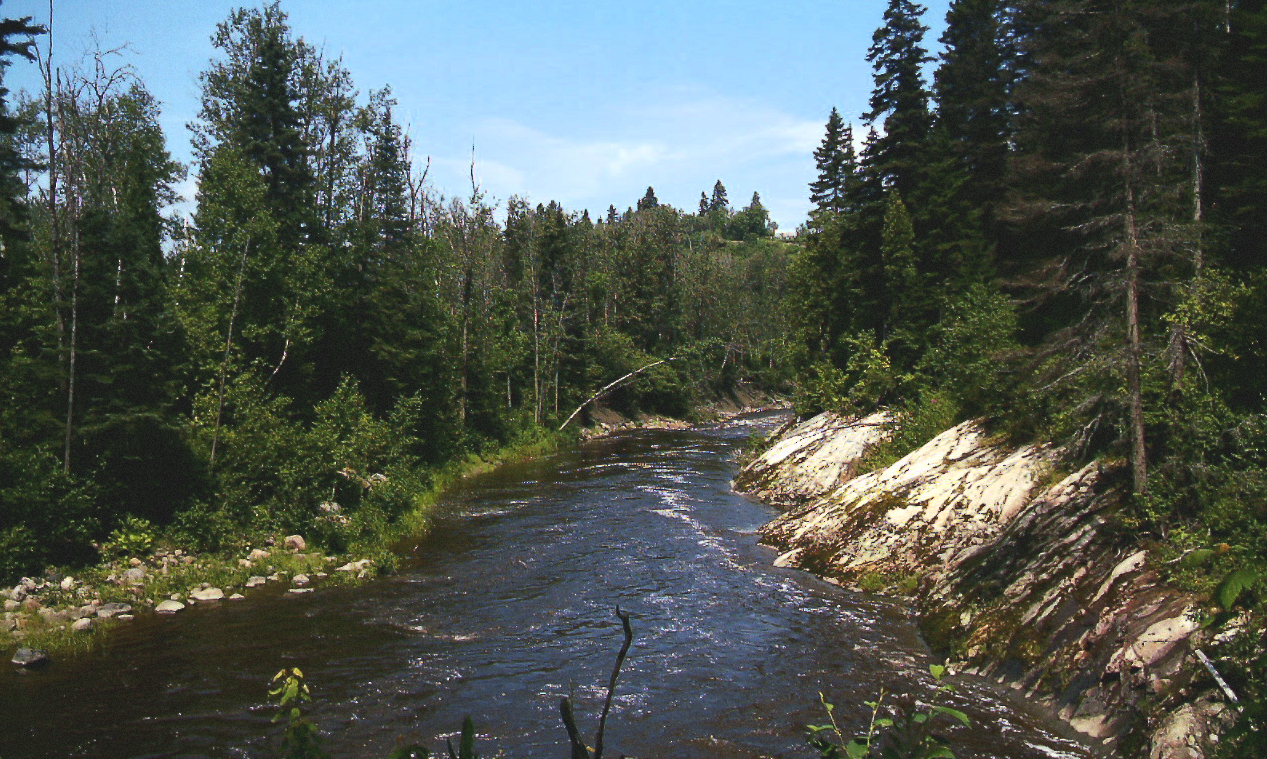

- Location within Quebec
- Etymology: English
- Native name: Rivière Langevin (French)

Location
- Country: Canada
- Province: Quebec
- Region: Saguenay-Lac-Saint-Jean
- Regional County Municipality: Le Fjord-du-Saguenay Regional County Municipality
- Unorganized territory and a city: Lac-Pikauba, Saguenay

Physical characteristics
- Source: lac du Moulin
  - location: Lac-Pikauba (Laurentides Wildlife Reserve)
  - coordinates: 47.93194°N 71.08389°W
  - elevation: 907 m (2,976 ft)
- Mouth: Saguenay River
  - location: Saguenay
  - coordinates: 48.430662°N 71.033458°W
  - elevation: 4 m (13 ft)
- Length: 82.2 km (51.1 mi)
- Discharge
  - location: Saguenay

Basin features
- Tributaries
  - left: (from the mouth) Ruisseau Maltais, décharge du lac Saint-Gelais, décharge du lac de la Dalle, décharge du lac des Prés, bras de Jacob, décharge du lac des Éclats, ruisseau, ruisseau, bras Sec, décharge de l'Étang Dolo,
  - right: (from the mouth) Cours d'eau Pednault-Maltais, décharge du lac Coupau, ruisseau, décharge de quelques lacs, décharge du lac Grenat, décharge du lac Bellefeuille et du Deuxième lac Guérin (via le lac Guérin).

The Rivière du Moulin (English: river of the Mill), also called Rivière Langevin, is a tributary of the Saguenay River. Its mouth is located in the Rivière-du-Moulin district, in the east of the Chicoutimi borough in Saguenay. The river is known for its urban park, the Rivière-du-Moulin park, located on its banks near its mouth.

The upper part of the Moulin river valley is served by the forest roads R0287 and by a secondary road descending part of the valley; this upper part is also indirectly served by the route 175 which passes on the west side. A few other secondary forest roads serve the "rivière du Moulin" valley, mainly for forestry and recreational tourism activities.

In addition to the urban and industrial area, crossing the Chicoutimi sector of the city of Saguenay, forestry is the main economic activity in this valley; recreational tourism, second.

The surface of the Moulin river is usually frozen from the beginning of December to the end of March, however the safe circulation on the ice is generally made from mid-December to mid-March, except in the rapids zone.

== Toponymy ==
The "rivière du Moulin" takes its name from the Sawmill built by Peter McLeod father around 1810 on the river, while he was employed by the Company North West. (Note: Annex G, p. 20.) This name is mentioned for the first time in 1827. (Note: Annex G, p. 6.) The name "Langevin" comes from the Langevin family who formerly owned a flour mill near its mouth. For their part, the Montagnais used the designation "Papawitish" to designate the river. (Note: Annex G, p. 5.) From Le Gardeur de Tilly's report in 1725 until 1825, half a dozen explorers will use this name. "Papawitish" would mean "beaver about 2 to 3 years old" in innu-aimun.

The toponym "Rivière du Moulin" was formalized on December 5, 1968, at the Place Names Bank of the Commission de toponymie du Québec.

== Geography ==
=== Course ===
The Moulin river begins its course at 907 m (2,976 ft) above sea level in the Laurentian Mountains. It originates in the Lac du Moulin (length: 1.8 km (1.1 mi)) in the Laurentides Wildlife Reserve. This lake is mainly fed by the outlet (coming from the south-east) from Lake Andrevos and by a stream coming from the east. This lake is located at:

- 4.1 km (2.5 mi) south-east of lac de l'Enfer;
- 6.5 km (4.0 mi) south-west of the course of the rivière à Mars North-West;
- 10.1 km (6.3 mi) north-east of route 175;
- 12.9 km (8.0 mi) north-east of the course of the Pikauba River;
- 54.8 km (34.1 mi) south-east of the confluence of the "rivière du Moulin" and the Saguenay River.

From the lac du Moulin, the rivière du Moulin flows mainly north for a length of 82.2 km (51.1 mi) to Saguenay, to finally jump into the Saguenay River.

Upper course of the rivière du Moulin (segment of 29.5 km (18.3 mi))

- 4.9 km (3.0 mi) towards the northwest by collecting the discharge (coming from the south) of lakes Calliope, Strachan and Riant, as well as the discharge (coming from the west) of the Dolo pond, in forming a curve towards the southwest by skirting a mountain whose summit reaches 895 m (2,936 ft), up to the outlet (coming from the east) of lakes Guérin and Bellefeuille;
- 7.0 km (4.3 mi) towards the northeast by collecting the outlet (coming from the southwest) of Lake Ogy, up to the outlet (coming from the east) of two lakes;
- 3.8 km (2.4 mi) towards the north by forming a curve towards the west to go around a mountain, up to a stream (coming from the east);
- 7.7 km (4.8 mi) to the northwest in a deep valley along the forest road R0215 to a stream (coming from the west) then to the northeast to another stream (coming from the northwest);
- 3.4 km (2.1 mi) towards the north-east then forking eastwards around a mountain whose summit reaches 481 m (1,578 ft);
- 2.7 km (1.7 mi) towards the north-east by forming a loop towards the south-east, up to Bras sec (coming from the north-west);

Intermediate course of the rivière du Moulin (segment of 25.5 km (15.8 mi))

- 1.0 km (0.62 mi) towards the north by winding up to the outlet (coming from the south-east) of Lac Coupau;
- 8.6 km (5.3 mi) north-west passing in front of the hamlet Sector-Charlevoix, to the outlet (coming from the south-west) of lakes Lanz, Rond and Éclats;
- 5.5 km (3.4 mi) towards the northwest by forming a curve towards the southwest in the middle of the segment to go around a mountain, up to Bras de Jacob (coming from the west);
- 6.5 km (4.0 mi) towards the north-east, forming a curve towards the west at the start of the segment, along part of the Quatre-Milles road, up to a bend corresponding to the point an island;
- 3.9 km (2.4 mi) westwards bypassing an island of 0.5 km (0.31 mi), crossing a marsh area, bypassing some small islands, collecting the discharge (coming from the north -est) of Lac de la Chaîne and bending towards the northwest at the end of the segment, up to a bend in the river, corresponding to the outlet of Lac de la Dalle;

Lower course of the rivière du Moulin (segment of 27.2 km (16.9 mi))

- 2.9 km (1.8 mi) first towards the east until a bend where the current passes under the railway bridge, then towards the north-east by collecting the outlet of Lake Saint-Gelais, along the chemin de la Chaîne and meandering up to the bridge on rue Gauthier, in the village of Laterrière;
- 3.8 km (2.4 mi) to the north by crossing a few rapids, collecting the outlet (coming from the south-east) from Lac des Pères, collecting a stream (coming from the south-east) and following the street Notre-Dame (continuity of Chemin de l'Église (Laterrière)) to the bridge of Chemin Saint-Isidore (Laterrière);
- 8.6 km (5.3 mi) to the north by collecting the outlet of Lac des Prés, along Chemin de l'Église (Laterrière) and meandering to the bridge at route 170;
- 3.0 km (1.9 mi) north along chemin du rang Sainte-Famille, passing under the two bridges of autoroute 50 and crossing the falls at Martel at the end of the segment, to a road bridge;
- 6.4 km (4.0 mi) to the northwest in the agricultural zone, passing under the railway bridge, then meandering passing in the Parc de la Rivière-du-Moulin on the east side of the center -City of Chicoutimi, to the highway bridge on Boulevard de l'Université Est;
- 2.5 km (1.6 mi) northwards in urban areas, crossing Langevin Falls and passing under the bridge on boulevard du Saguenay Est at the end of the segment, to its mouth.

The "rivière du Moulin" flows on the south-eastern bank of the Saguenay River in the "Rivière-du-Moulin" district northeast of downtown Saguenay. This confluence is located 2.7 km (1.7 mi) downstream from the Dubuc bridge which spans the Saguenay River at the height of downtown Saguenay, 0.55 km (0.34 mi) facing the northwest shore of the Saguenay River and 5.0 km (3.1 mi) upstream from the bridge of route 172 at the mouth of the Valin River on the north bank of the Saguenay River.

From the mouth of the Moulin river, the current follows the course of the Saguenay River on 126.1 km (78.4 mi) eastwards to Tadoussac where it meets with the Saint Lawrence Estuary.

=== Hydrology ===
The watershed of the "rivière du Moulin" has an area of 373 km (231.77 mi). In all, it has 835 permanent rivers, 1,398 intermittent, 257 lakes, 2 reservoirs and 378 wetlands. The main tributaries of the river are the rivers Croft, Fortin-Gobeil, Pedneault-Maltais, Romuald-Simard, de la Savane, Tremblay-Saint-Gelais, the Maltais stream and the Pères stream as well as the Bras de Jacob, "Jacob Ouest et Sec". The two most important lakes are Lac du Moulin and Grand Lac.

=== Geology ===
The "rivière du Moulin" crosses two geomorphological regions; the Laurentian Mountains) and the lowlands of the Saguenay from Laterrière and downstream.

=== Population ===
It is estimated that there were approximately between 10,000 and 15000 people who lived in the rivière du Moulin basin in 2001. (Note: p. 119.) All residents are residents of the city of Saguenay. The population density is 22/km^{2} (57/sq mi) in the sector Laterrière and 384.4/km^{2} (996/sq mi) in Chicoutimi.

== Photographic gallery ==
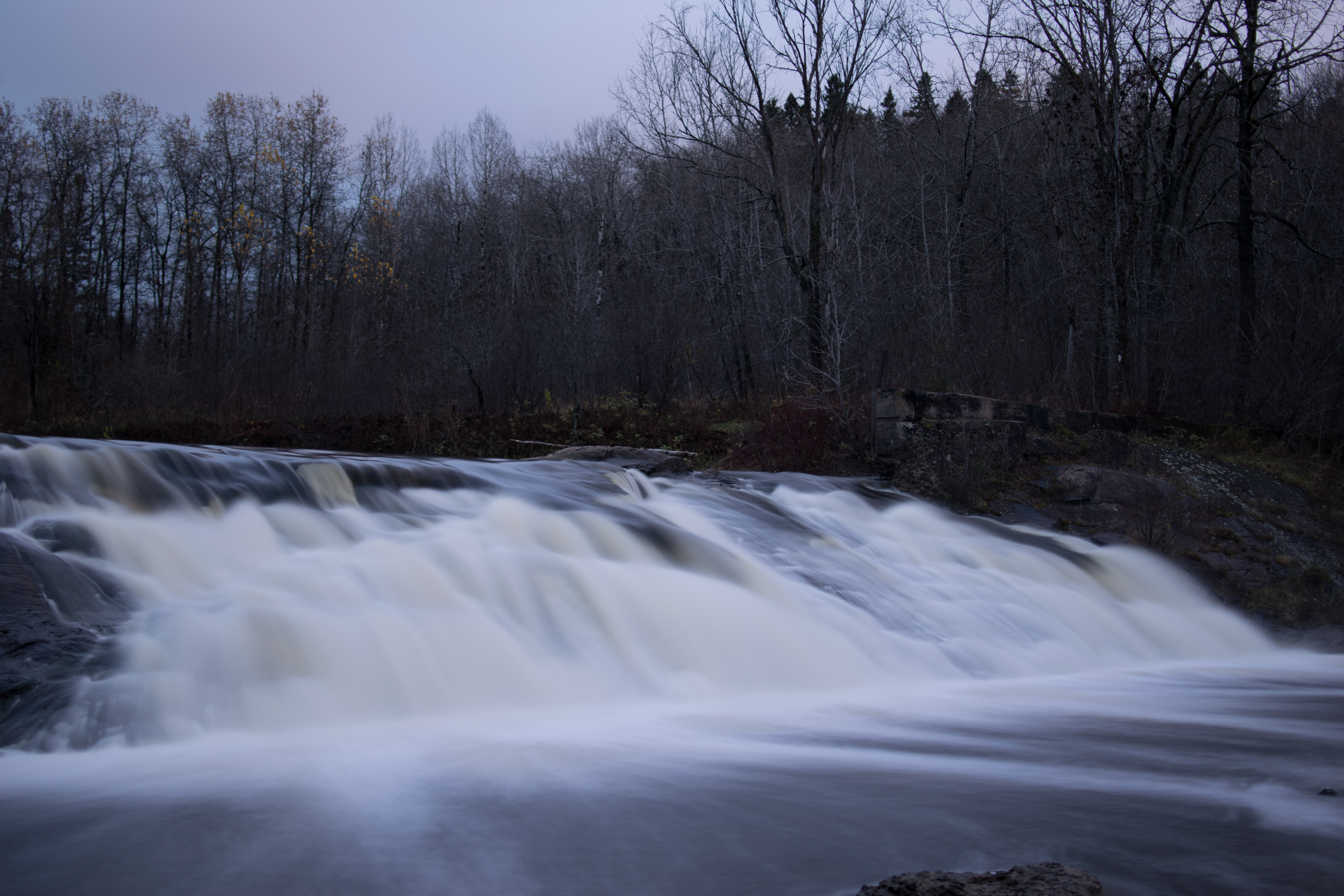
Rivière-du-Moulin, near Chicoutimi

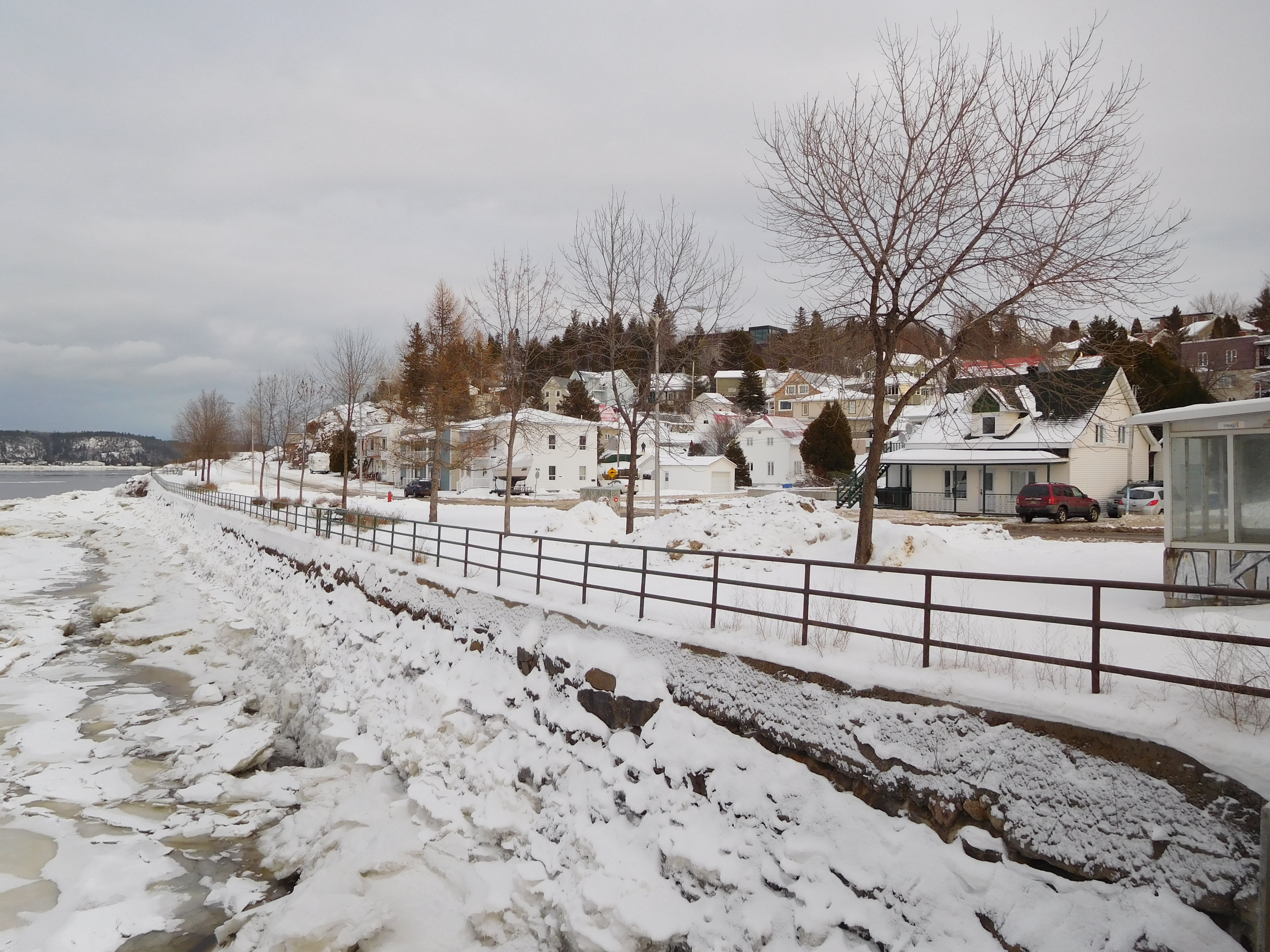
View from Saguenay boulevard, in Chicoutimi

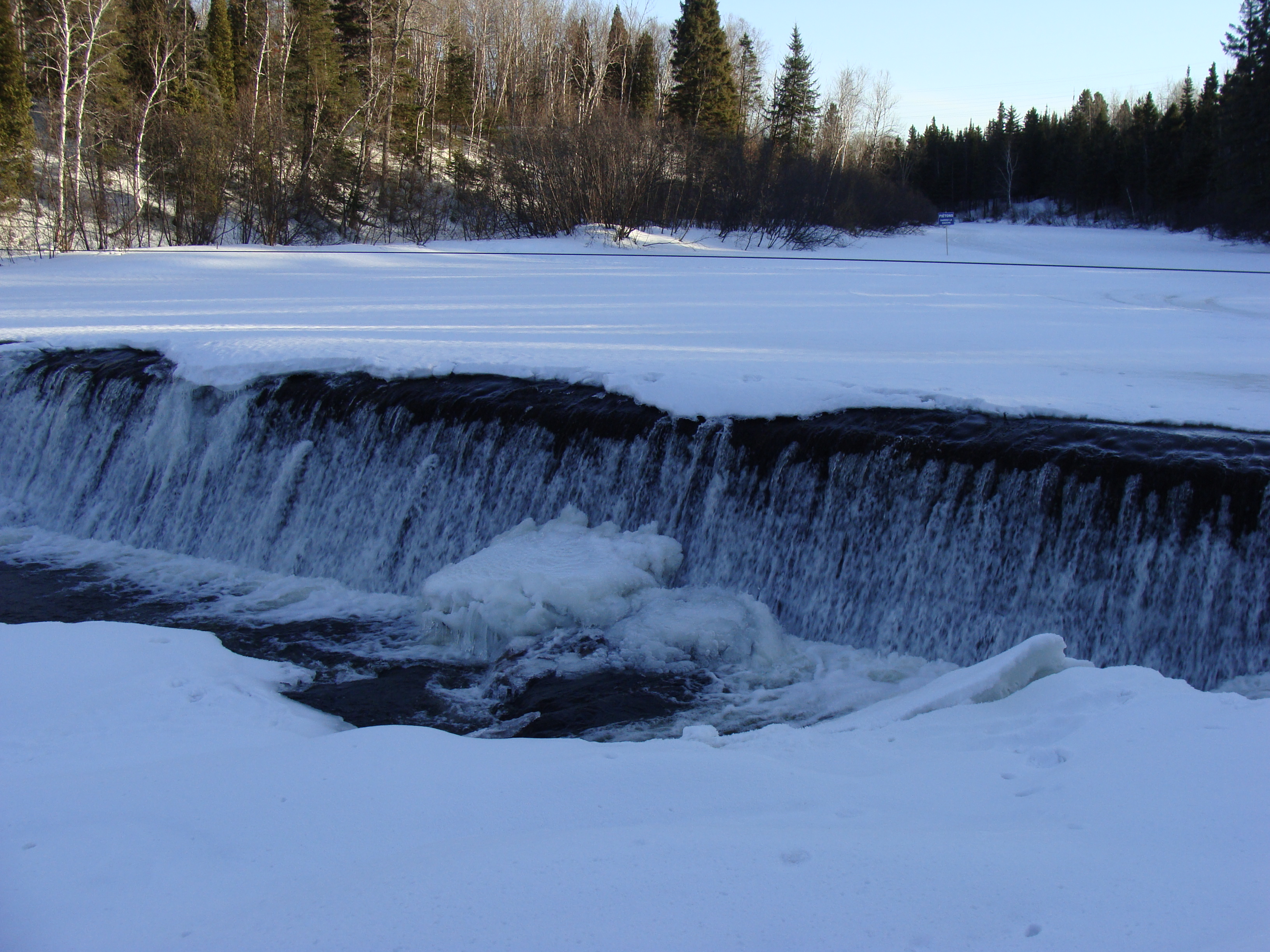
View from Parc de la rivière-du-Moulin, in Chicoutimi

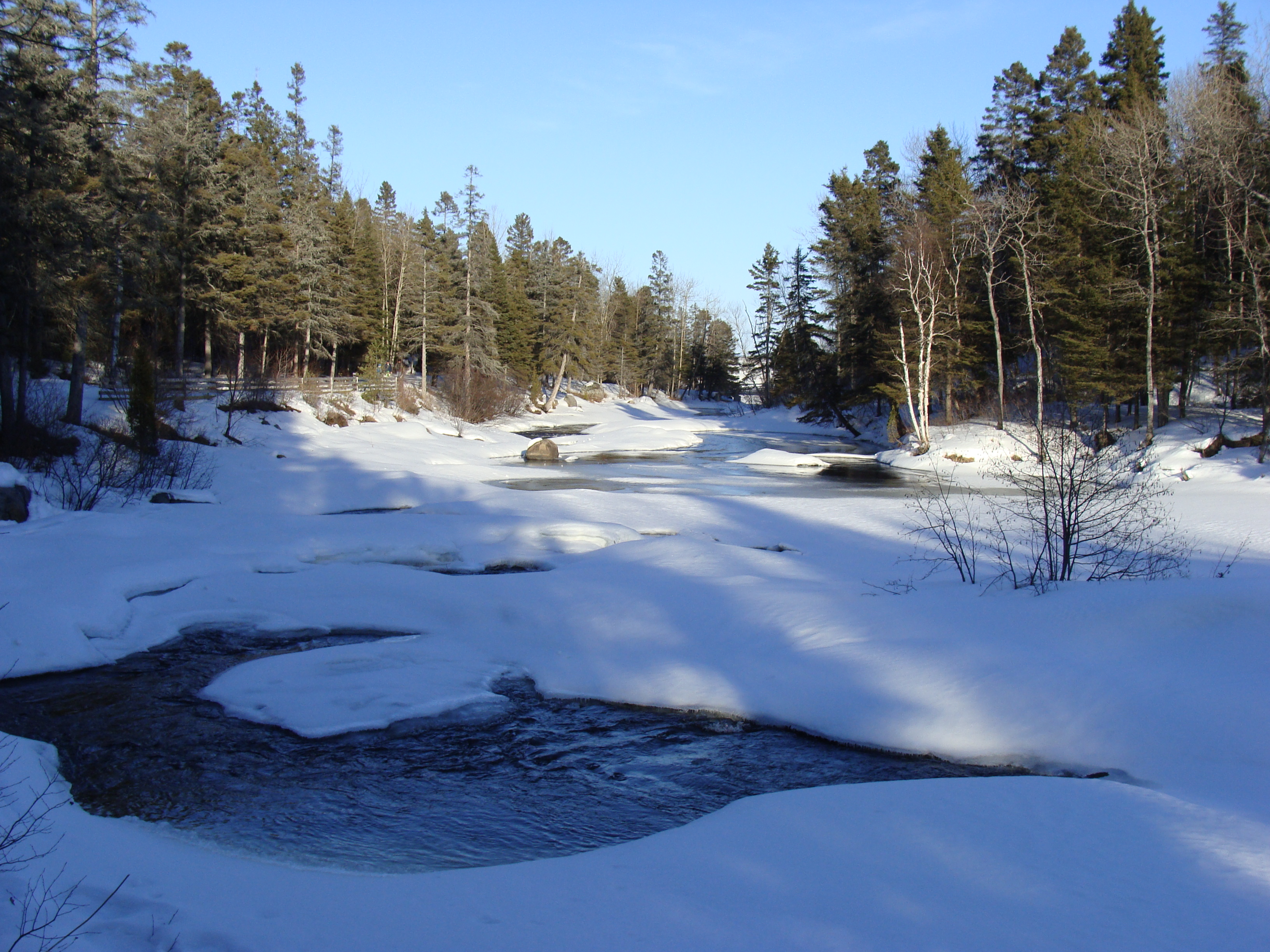
View from Parc de la rivière-du-Moulin, in Chicoutimi

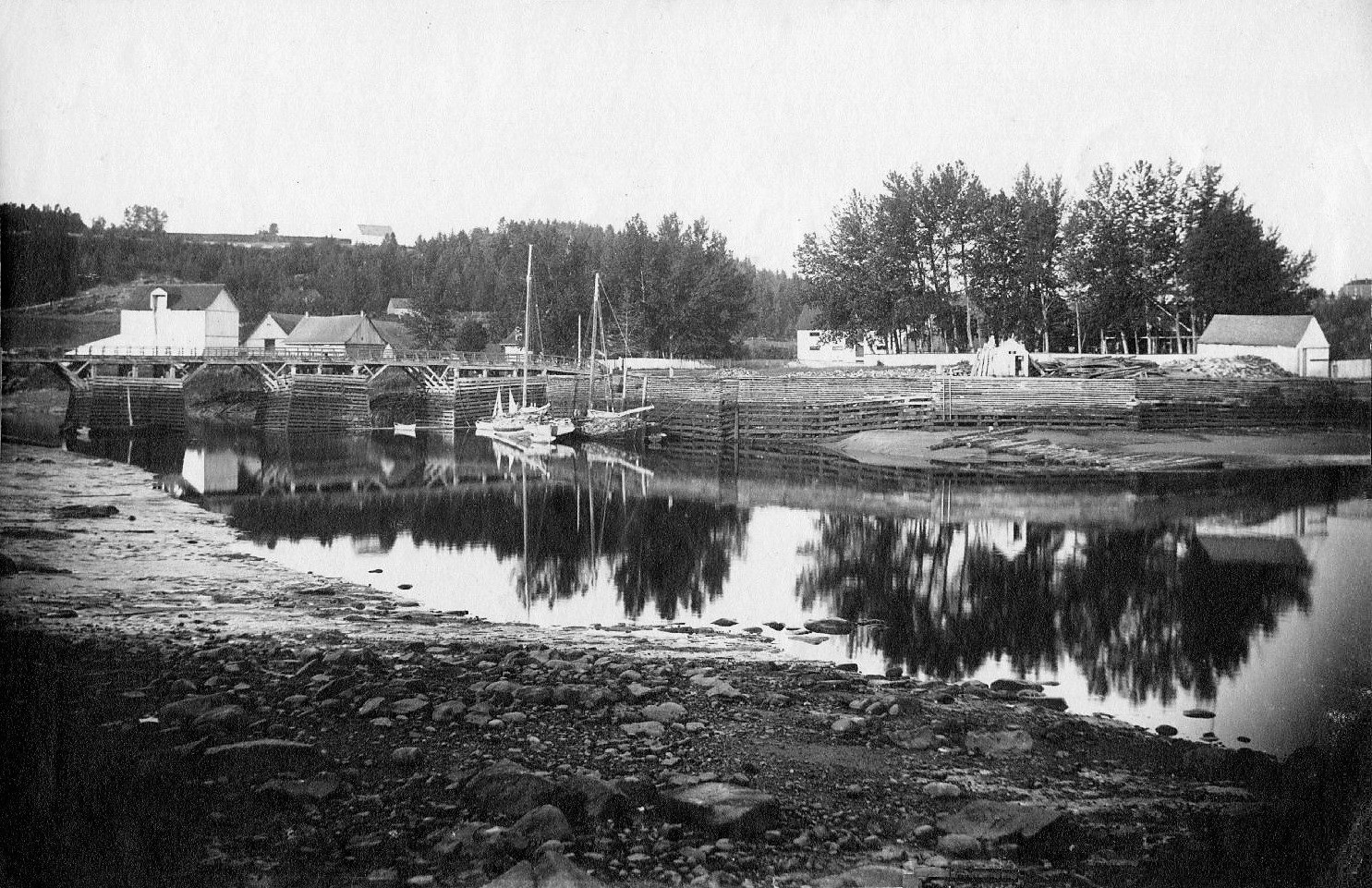
Residence Price, between 1895 and 1921

== See also ==
- Chicoutimi, an urban sector
- Saguenay, a city
- Rivière-du-Moulin (Quartier), an urban district
- Laterrière, an urban area
- Le Fjord-du-Saguenay Regional County Municipality
- Zec Mars-Moulin, a ZEC
- Laurentides Wildlife Reserve
- Rivière-du-Moulin Park, an urban park
- Bras de Jacob, a stream
- Bras Sec, a stream
- List of rivers of Quebec

== Bibliography ==
- Watershed committee Rivage de la rivière du Moulin (2005). Plan of action of the Rivière du Moulin watershed. Saguenay..
