= Rivière à Mars =

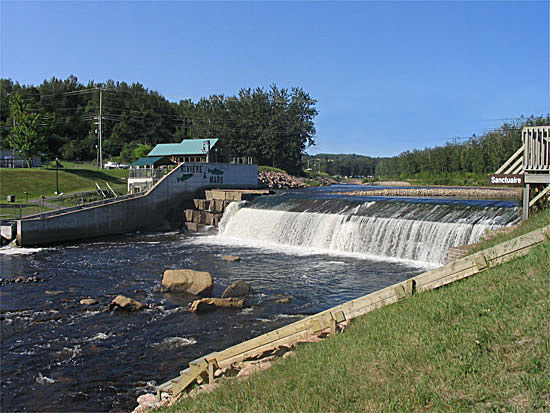

- Location within Quebec

Location
- Country: Canada
- Province: Quebec
- Region: Capitale-Nationale and Saguenay-Lac-Saint-Jean
- Regional County Municipality: Charlevoix Regional County Municipality, Le Fjord-du-Saguenay Regional County Municipality
- Unorganized territory, municipality and city: Lac-Pikauba, Saguenay (city)

Physical characteristics
- Source: Little unidentified lake
  - location: Lac-Pikauba
  - coordinates: 47.74512°N 70.962582°W
  - elevation: 869 m (2,851 ft)
- Mouth: Saguenay River
  - location: Saguenay (ville)
  - coordinates: 48.33583°N 70.87972°W
  - elevation: 72 m (236 ft)
- Length: 104.1 km (64.7 mi)
- Discharge
  - location: Saguenay (city)

Basin features
- Tributaries
  - left: (from the mouth) Ruisseau Bluteau, ruisseau Rouge, outlet of lac Gravel, outlet of lac Donald, La Grosse Décharge, discharge of a set of lakes such "lac Isaïe", discharge of "Lac du Portage", bras d'Isaïe, discharge of "lac De Léry", bras de l'Enfer, coulée des Larmes, rivière à Mars North-West, discharge of lac Dun, ruisseau au Goéland, ruisseau non identifié.
  - right: (from the mouth) "Décharge à Paul-Dufour", "décharge du lac Côme", bras du Coco, "décharge du Petit lac Castule" and "du Grand lac Castule", "décharge du lac Vert", outlet of some unidentified lakes, outlet of lac Girard, outlet of lac Colon, outlet of lac Stymphale, outlet of lac Dusette.

The Rivière à Mars is a tributary of the Baie des Ha! Ha! Crossing the borough La Baie, in Saguenay (city), in the administrative region of Saguenay–Lac-Saint-Jean, in Quebec, in Canada. The "rivière à Mars" is a tributary of the Saguenay River and has its source in the Laurentides Wildlife Reserve. This river to salmons was badly affected by the Saguenay Flood which occurred from July 19 to 21, 1996.

From the mouth of the river, the "rivière à Mars" valley is served by the route 381 which cuts the river at La Baie, "chemin des Chutes" (north shore) and "Chemin Saint-Louis" (south shore), as well as by rail. Upstream, this valley is served by the Consol Paper road and a few other secondary forest roads for forestry and recreational tourism activities.

Forestry is the main economic activity in this valley; industrial and port activities, second; recreational tourism activities, third.

The surface of the Mars river is usually frozen from the beginning of December to the end of March, however the safe circulation on the ice is generally done from mid-December to mid-March.

== Geography ==
Taking its source at the mouth of a small lake at 869 m (2,851 ft) above sea level in the Laurentides Wildlife Reserve, the "rivière à Mars" flows from south to northeast in a descent comprising several tumultuous and rugged segments. The "rivière à Mars" flows over 104.1 km (64.7 mi) with a drop of 797 m (2,615 ft) especially in the forest zone except the last segment of 10.7 km (6.6 mi) in industrial zone and urban at the end of the course, according to the following segments:

Upper course of the rivière à Mars (segment of 38.1 km (23.7 mi))

- 2.2 km (1.4 mi) to the north in a deep valley crossing Lac Turcotte (length: 0.6 km (0.37 mi); altitude: 911 m (2,989 ft)) at its peak length, to its mouth;
- 6.3 km (3.9 mi) north, to the confluence of the outlet of Edmond Lake (coming from the west);
- 4.4 km (2.7 mi) towards the north by winding and collecting the discharge (coming from the east) of Lake Dusette, to the discharge (coming from the east) of Lake Stymphale;
- 5.8 km (3.6 mi) to the north, collecting the discharge (coming from the east) from Lake Colon and forming sawtooth at the end of the segment, up to the discharge of a stream (coming from South);
- 10.5 km (6.5 mi) towards the north, curving towards the northwest by collecting the outlet of lac des Caves and meandering at the end of the segment to the stream at Goéland (coming from the south);
- 8.9 km (5.5 mi) (or 5.8 km (3.6 mi) in a direct line) towards the northwest by forming numerous small streamers, until the confluence of the rivière à Mars North-West;

Intermediate course of the rivière à Mars (segment of 40.8 km (25.4 mi) in forest area)

- 10.7 km (6.6 mi) towards the northwest passing north of Mont aux Oiseaux (altitude: 535 m (1,755 ft)) where a fire tower had been built, then forming a curve towards east before branching north to Bras de l'Enfer (rivière à Mars);
- 10.6 km (6.6 mi) towards the north, passing between two mountains and forming a hook of 0.5 km (0.31 mi) towards the west, until the discharge (coming from the south-east) from Lac Noir;
- 3.4 km (2.1 mi) north in a deep valley, to a bend in the river;
- 8.1 km (5.0 mi) towards the north-west by forming a hook of 0.8 km (0.50 mi) towards the north, up to the outlet (coming from the south) of "Lac du Portage";
- 8.0 km (5.0 mi) to the north, collecting the outlet (coming from the east) of Lac Vert, the outlet (coming from the east) of "Petit lac Castule" and "Grand lac Castule", branching off towards northeast, to the confluence of the Bras d'Isaïe (coming from the west);

Lower course of the rivière à Mars (segment of 25.2 km (15.7 mi) in forest area)

- 2.2 km (1.4 mi) eastwards to the confluence of the Bras du Coco (coming from the south-east)
- 6.3 km (3.9 mi) north-west to the outlet (coming from the east) of Lake Como;
- 2.2 km (1.4 mi) towards the north-west crossing some rapids until the confluence of the La Grosse Décharge (coming from the west);
- 3.8 km (2.4 mi) towards the north-west crossing some rapids and forming a hook of 0.3 km (0.19 mi) towards the south-east, up to a bend in the river;
- 8.0 km (5.0 mi) towards the northeast by forming a loop towards the northwest where a railway bridge is laid out and by forming a hook of 1.0 km (0.62 mi) towards the northeast at the end of the segment, either after having crossed the bridge from route 381, to the Rouge stream (coming from the west);
- 2.7 km (1.7 mi) north-east in the La Baie borough, crossing a zone of rapids, passing under two road bridges and a railway bridge, to its mouth.

The Mars River flows into the Baie des Ha! Ha! from the Saguenay fjord after crossing the borough of La Baie, in Saguenay (city). From there, the current crosses the Baie des Ha! Ha! Northeast on 11.0 km (6.8 mi), then follow the course of the Saguenay River east on 99.5 km (61.8 mi) until Tadoussac where it merges with the Saint Lawrence estuary.

== Aquatic fauna ==
The river offers fishing for Atlantic salmon and sea trout (anadromous Saguenay brook trout). Salmon fishing is wading and fly fishing only on the most easily accessible 7 km (4.3 mi) of river.

From 1894 to 1935, the Price Brothers company operated a private fishing club on the river in Mars. In 1930, the construction of a dam limited access to salmon and allowed timber to float until 1952. Following major seeding and development work, including the creation of a fishway for salmon, the Association of sport fishermen of the Mars river was formed in 1983, and fishing reopened in 1992.

== History ==
During colonization, around the 1870s, the first colonist to settle on the banks of the river was named Mars Simard, hence the origin of the name of the "Mars river".

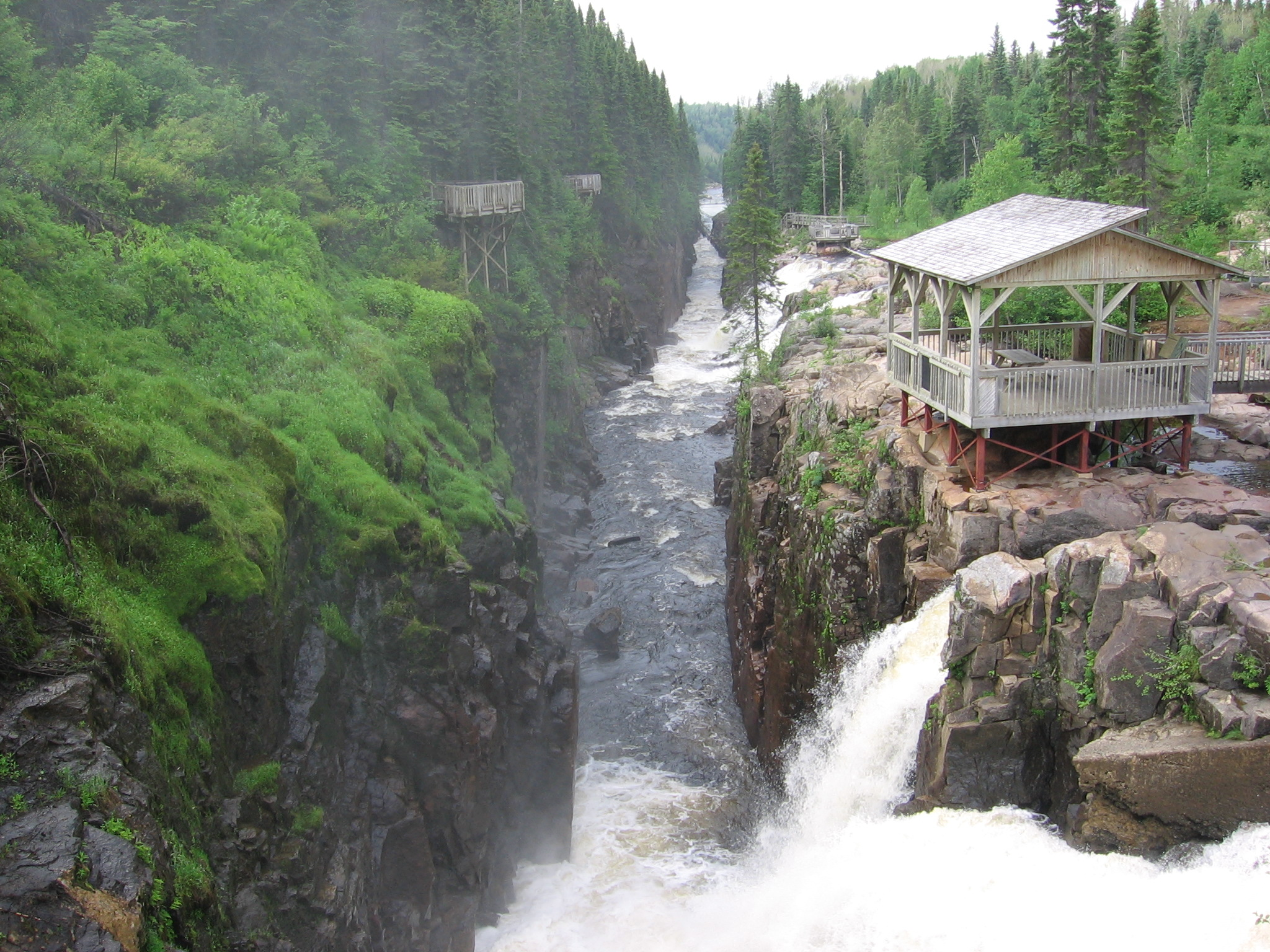
Canyon in "rivière à Mars"

- 1872-
- 1888-permit granted by William Price for the construction of a wooden dike used for a bakery to grind grain.
- 1891 to 1914 - keeping of a fishing register by Mr. Mars Simard on behalf of Mr. Price who received several guests who came to fish for salmon.
- 1930 - Beginning of the floating of wood and the log on the river.
- 1934 - Writing and publication of the historical novel Rivière à Mars by Damase Potvin.
- 1945 - End of wood floating.
- 1983 - Foundation of the Association of Sports Fishermen of the River in Mars.
- 1984 - Hydro morphological inventory of the first 35 km.
- 1985 - Closure of sport fishing.
- 1985 - Beginning of the five-year salmon stocking plan.
- 1985 - Construction of a fishway
- 1987 - Signature of a memorandum of understanding with Ville de La Baie.
- 1990 - Beginning of the Economic Development Plan for Salmon.
- 1992 - Beginning of sport fishing for salmon.
- 1996 - Flood: destruction of the fishway and the dam.
- 1997 - Reconstruction of the fishway and the dam.
- 1997 - Stabilization of the banks and development of ponds;
- 1998 - Creation of the Fjord Quartet of Saguenay salmon rivers.
- 1999 - Updating of the development plan for the river at Mars.
- 1999 - Regional consultation on the survival of sea trout in the Saguenay.
- 2000 - Study plan on the strategic development of the Mars river.
- 2001 - Acquisition of the campsite Au Jardin de mon Père by the organization.
- 2003 - Sea trout reintroduction strategy (only about fifty counted).
- 2004 - Beginning of the development plan for anadromous brook trout (sea trout).
- 2004 - Construction and installation of two egg incubators in the river.
- 2005 - Construction and installation of six other incubators in the river.
- 2006 - Obtaining of a sowing plan for salmon fry.
- 2006 - Start of work to redevelop the ponds of the river in Mars.
- 2007 - Stocking of salmon fry for the next 5 years.
- 2009 - Significant increase in anadromous brook trout (650 sea trout).
- 2011 - Repair of the deck of the Roméo Tremblay dam.

== Toponymy ==
The toponym "Rivière à Mars" was formalized on December 5, 1968, at the Place Names Bank of the Commission de toponymie du Québec.

== Appendices ==
=== Related articles ===
- Charlevoix Regional County Municipality
- Le Fjord-du-Saguenay Regional County Municipality
- Laurentides Wildlife Reserve
- Zec de la Rivière-à-Mars, a controlled harvesting zone
- Zec Mars-Moulin, a controlled exploitation area
- Baie des Ha! Ha!
- Saguenay (city)
- Saguenay River
- Rivière à Mars North-West
- List of rivers of Quebec
