= Grand Portage River =

Grand Portage River may refer to:

- Rivière du Grand Portage, Saguenay–Lac-Saint-Jean, Quebec, Canada
  - Grand Portage South-East River, a tributary of rivière du Grand Portage
  - Grand Portage South-West River, a tributary of rivière du Grand Portage

== See also ==
- Grand Portage–Pigeon River Border Crossing
- Grand Portage of the Saint Louis River
- Grand Portage (disambiguation)
