= Little River of the Chef =

Location
- Country: Canada
- Province: Quebec
- Region: Saguenay-Lac-Saint-Jean

Physical characteristics
- Source: Aigremont Lake
  - location: Lac-Ashuapmushuan, Quebec (unorganized territory), RCM Le Domaine-du-Roy, Saguenay-Lac-Saint-Jean, Quebec
  - coordinates: 49°19′30″N 73°48′56″W
  - elevation: 397 m (1,302 ft)
- Mouth: La Loche River (Ashuapmushuan River)
  - location: Lac-Ashuapmushuan, Quebec (unorganized territory), RCM Le Domaine-du-Roy, Saguenay-Lac-Saint-Jean, Quebec
  - coordinates: 49°22′16″N 73°42′50″W
  - elevation: 382 m (1,253 ft)
- Length: 13.7 km (8.5 mi)

Basin features
- Tributaries
  - left: (upstream); outlet of lake Réans; outlet of lake Aubertin; outlet of lake Rétaud; outlet of lakes de la Crapaudière, Férin, Grabels, Mignault, en Chenille, Saudron, Agris, Véel, Virgule; outlet of lake Lac Cozzano; outlet of lakes Irles, des Petits Rapides, Issel, Bouteillet, Tomahawk, Bachois, Hermé, du Petit Chien, Pommard, Mélan, Penché, Liguol, Briec, Monsac, Savoyard, Olley, Thot, Chiron, Crépand, thainas, Ymer and Aristote.
  - right: (upstream); outlet of lake Touin; outlet of lake de la Banquette; outlet of a set of lakes such Montoir, Dionysos, Brugelogne, Asset, Burcin, Palavas, Famars et Halsou.

The Little River of the Chef (French: Petite rivière du Chef) is a tributary of the La Loche River (Ashuapmushuan River), flowing into the unorganized territory of Lac-Ashuapmushuan, Quebec, into the Regional County Municipality (RCM) of Le Domaine-du-Roy, in the administrative region of Saguenay-Lac-Saint-Jean, in Quebec, in Canada.

The "Little River of the Chef" flows in the townships of Aigremont, Denault and Cazeneuve. The upper part of the river runs through the Ashuapmushuan Wildlife Reserve. Forestry is the main economic activity of this valley; recreational tourism activities, second.

The forest road R0203 (North-South direction) serves the lower part of the valley of the "Little River of the Chef"; this road starts at the junction of route 167 which links Chibougamau to Saint-Félicien, Quebec. Going up north, the R0203 road branches off to the northeast to reach the Hilarion River.

The "Little River of the Chef" is usually frozen from early November to mid-May, however, safe ice circulation is generally from mid-November to mid-April.

== Geography ==
The surrounding hydrographic slopes of the "Little River of the Chef" are:
- north side: Hilarion River, Dobleau River, Dobleau Lake, Vimont Lake (Lac-Ashuapmushuan), Epervier River, Hogan River;
- east side: La Loche River (Ashuapmushuan River), Ashuapmushuan River, Hilarion River, Mazarin River;
- south side: Aigremont Lake, Ashuapmushuan River, Ashuapmushuan Lake, Marquette River;
- west side: Atouk Creek, Nicabau Lake, Rohault Lake, Bouteroue Lake, Chaudière River (Normandin River), Tonnerre River (Normandin River).

The "Little River of the Chef" originates at the mouth of Aigremont Lake (length: 7.7 kilometres (4.8 mi), altitude: 397 metres (1,302 ft)) located in the township of Le Ber. The mouth of this head lake is located at:

- 5.5 kilometres (3.4 mi) south of the mouth of the "Little River of the Chef" (confluence with the La Loche River (Ashuapmushuan River));
- 11.8 kilometres (7.3 mi) west of the mouth of the La Loche River (Ashuapmushuan River);
- 13.6 kilometres (8.5 mi) northwest of the mouth of the Normandin River (confluence with Ashuapmushuan Lake);
- 131 kilometres (81 mi) northwest of the mouth of the Ashuapmushuan River (confluence with Lac Saint-Jean).

From the mouth of Aigremont Lake, the course of the "Little River of the Chef" flows over 13.7 kilometres (8.5 mi) according to the following segments:

- 3.5 kilometres (2.2 mi) to the North (with a curve towards the North-East at the end of the segment) in particular by cutting a forest road at the beginning of the segment and crossing on 0.5 kilometres (0.31 mi) "Débâcle Lake" (length: 0.8 metres (2 ft 7 in); altitude: 393 metres (1,289 ft)) to the southwestern shore of Lac des Cantons;
- 1.3 kilometres (0.81 mi) to the east, crossing Lake Cantons (length: 1.8 kilometres (1.1 mi); altitude: 389 metres (1,276 ft));
- 0.5 kilometres (0.31 mi) north-east, to the southern limit of the canton of Cazeneuve;
- 8.4 kilometres (5.2 mi) northeasterly in Cazeneuve Township to mouth.

The confluence of the "Petite rivière du Chef" with the Normandin River is located at:

- 9.8 kilometres (6.1 mi) northwest of the mouth of the La Loche River (Ashuapmushuan River);
- 11.0 kilometres (6.8 mi) north of route 167;
- 127.7 kilometres (79.3 mi) northwest of the mouth of the Ashuapmushuan River (confluence with lac Saint-Jean);
- 164.3 kilometres (102.1 mi) northwest of the mouth of lac Saint-Jean (confluence with the Saguenay River).
The "Little River of the Chef" flows to the southwest shore of the La Loche River (Ashuapmushuan River), which is 12.4 kilometres (7.7 mi) downstream from the confluence of the La Loche River (Ashuapmushuan River) with the Ashuapmushuan River. From this last confluence, the current flows down the Ashuapmushuan River (length: 193 kilometres (120 mi), to the northeast, then to the southeast, which flows to Saint-Félicien, Quebec on the west shore of Lac Saint-Jean.

== Toponymy ==
The toponym "Petite rivière du Chef" was officialized on December 5, 1968, at the Commission de toponymie du Québec, when it was created.

== See also ==
- Saguenay River
- Lac Saint-Jean, a body of water
- Ashuapmushuan River, a watercourse
- La Loche River (Ashuapmushuan River), a stream
- Lac-Ashuapmushuan, Quebec, an unorganized territory
- Le Domaine-du-Roy, a regional county municipality (MRC)
- List of rivers of Quebec
