= Rivière de la Licorne =

River in Saguenay-Lac-Saint-Jean, Quebec, Canada

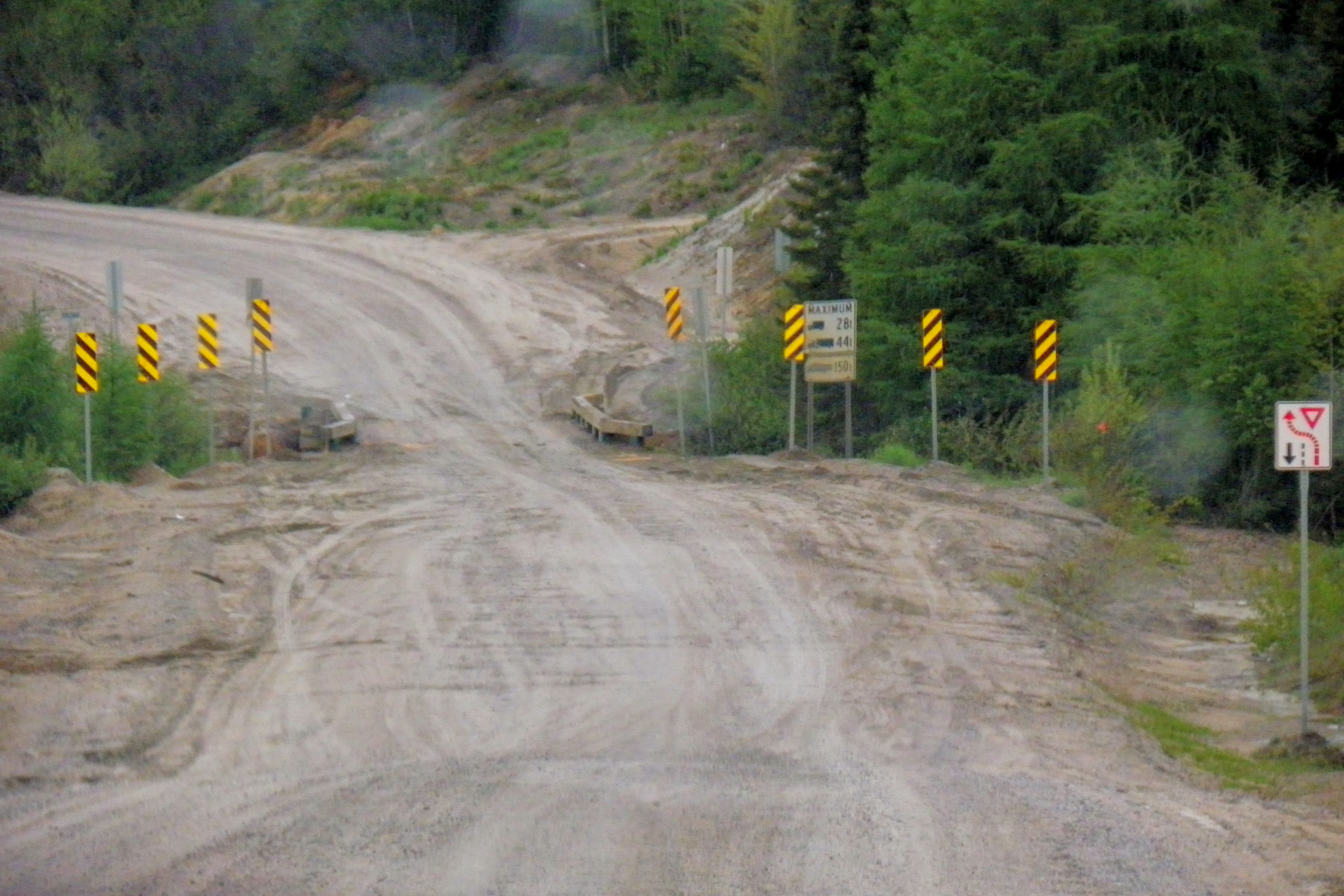

Location
- Country: Canada
- Province: Quebec
- Region: Saguenay-Lac-Saint-Jean
- Regional County Municipality: Le Domaine-du-Roy Regional County Municipality

Physical characteristics
- Source: Lake Decharnay
  - location: Lac-Ashuapmushuan
  - coordinates: 48°55′52″N 73°39′00″W
  - elevation: 514 m (1,686 ft)
- Mouth: Gabriel-Fleury Lake
  - location: Lac-Ashuapmushuan (unorganized territory)
  - coordinates: 49°08′28″N 73°38′11″W
  - elevation: 371 m (1,217 ft)
- Length: 33.0 km (20.5 mi)

Basin features
- Progression: Chigoubiche River, Ashuapmushuan River, Lac Saint-Jean, Saguenay River
- River system: Gabriel-Fleury Lake, Lac du Grand Duc, discharge, Ashuapmushuan Lake, Ashuapmushuan River, lac Saint-Jean, Saguenay River, Gulf of Saint Lawrence
- Tributaries
  - left: (upstream); discharge from Lake Granès; discharge from a set of lakes including Tracé; Lapège and Vanesses; discharge from Lake Rubis; discharge from a few small lakes; discharge from lakes Bédéchan and Bécasseaux; discharge from a group of lakes including Bégin, Tassé, Kernével, Baratier, Bourgeois, Louval, Laymond and Carsac; discharge of a set of lakes including the Licorne, Mainates and Surmulot; discharge of Lake Puxe.
  - right: (upstream); discharge of lakes Pie-XII and Jonsac; discharge of a set of lakes including Beaufrai, Iviers, Belles-Angéliques, Momeny, Hurlus, Rohomier and Cindré; Côte Croche stream.

The Licorne River is a tributary of the Ashuapmushuan Lake watershed, flowing into the unorganized territory of Lac-Ashuapmushuan in the Le Domaine-du-Roy Regional County Municipality, in the administrative region of Saguenay–Lac-Saint-Jean, in the province of Quebec, in Canada.

The valley of the Licorne River is mainly served by secondary forest roads for the needs of forestry activities. These secondary roads are indirectly linked to route 212 (east–west direction) which cuts this valley towards the middle of the course of the river. While the route 167 crosses the north side of the mouth of the river. Official website of the Ashuapmushuan Wildlife Reserve

Forestry (mainly silviculture) is the main economic activity in this valley; secondly, recreational tourism activities, mainly because of the Ashuapmushuan Wildlife Reserve.

== Geography ==
The Licorne River draws its source from Lake Decharnay (length: 3.6 km (2.2 mi); altitude: 514 m (1,686 ft)). This lake has at its center an island with a length of 0.7 km (0.43 mi) and a bay stretching 1.2 km (0.75 mi) towards the north. This head lake is fed by three stream discharges (coming from the south).

This spring is located in a mountainous area in the unorganized territory of Lac-Ashuapmushuan at:

- 10.3 km (6.4 mi) northwest of a curve in the rivière du Grand Portage;
- 14.0 km (8.7 mi) south-west of Chigoubiche Lake;
- 17.0 km (10.6 mi) northeast of Lac Marquette (slope of Marquette River);
- 18.7 km (11.6 mi) southwest of the Canadian National.

From the mouth of Lake Decharnay, the Licorne river flows over 33.0 km (20.5 mi) with a drop of 143 m (469 ft), entirely in the forest zone, according to the following segments:

- 8.4 km (5.2 mi) towards the north-west, collecting the discharge (coming from the west) of Lac Puxe, to the Côte Croche stream (coming from the south-east);
- 8.6 km (5.3 mi) towards the north collecting the discharge (coming from the northwest) of Lac de la Licorne and Lac des Mainates; the discharge of a set of lakes including Bégin, Tassé, Kernével and Baratier; by forming a hook towards the east, up to a bend in the river, corresponding to the outlet of the Bécasseaux and Bédéchan lakes; then north-east, to the discharge (coming from the south) of a set of lakes including Beaufrai, Iviers, Belles-Angéliques, Momeny, Rohomier, Hurlus and Cindré;
- 2.9 km (1.8 mi) towards the north, crossing the forest road at the start of the segment, forming a hook towards the east, until the outlet (coming from the east) of the Pie-XII lakes, Auré and Willows;
- 13.9 km (8.6 mi) (or 7.7 km in a direct line) first to the north-west, winding widely and in a marsh area for almost all this segment, collecting the discharge (coming from the west) of a few small lakes, by collecting the discharge (coming from the south) of Lac Rubis, by collecting the discharge (coming from the south) of a set of lakes including Tracé, Lapège, Vanesses, the discharge (coming from the west) of Lake Granès, to the south shore of Lake Gabriel-Fleury (the mouth of this river).

The Licorne River flows onto the south bank of the Gabriel-Fleury Lake. This confluence is located at:

- 2.5 km (1.6 mi) south of the Canadian National railway (near the place called Bochart) and route 167;
- 2.0 km (1.2 mi) west of the Chigoubiche Lake;
- 12.9 km (8.0 mi) east of the mouth of Ashuapmushuan Lake.

From the mouth of the Licorne River, the current successively crosses Lake Gabriel-Fleury, and Lac du Grand Duc; then descends the discharge of this last lake on 7.3 km (4.5 mi), then across lake Ashuapmushuan on 12.8 km (8.0 mi); then successively descend the course of the Ashuapmushuan river on 193 km (120 mi) (i.e. its full length), then cross lac Saint-Jean eastward on 41.1 km (25.5 mi) (i.e. its full length), follows the course of the Saguenay River via La Petite Décharge on 172.3 km (107.1 mi) east to Tadoussac where it meets the estuary of Saint Lawrence.

== Toponymy ==
The toponym "rivière de la Licorne" was made official on June 18, 1971.

== See also ==
- List of rivers of Quebec
