= Gabriel-Fleury Lake =

Lake in Quebec, Canada

- Location within Quebec
- Location: Lac-Ashuapmushuan, Quebec (unorganized territory), Le Domaine-du-Roy Regional County Municipality (RCM)
- Coordinates: 49°08′45″N 73°38′18″W
- Type: Natural
- Primary inflows: (clockwise); discharge of Lake Douvier; Discharge of Rivière de la Licorne.
- Primary outflows: Lake Grand Duc.
- Basin countries: Canada
- Max. length: 1.5 kilometres (0.93 mi)
- Max. width: 1.0 kilometre (0.62 mi)
- Surface elevation: 371 metres (1,217 ft)

The lake Gabriel-Fleury is part of the hydrographic slope of Ashuapmushuan Lake, flowing in the unorganized territory of Lac-Ashuapmushuan, in the Le Domaine-du-Roy Regional County Municipality, in the administrative region of Saguenay–Lac-Saint-Jean, Quebec, Canada. The lake is located right in the centre of the Ashuapmushuan Wildlife Reserve.

The Canadian National railway passes just 1.4 km (0.87 mi) to the north, as does the route 167 connecting Chibougamau to Saint-Félicien.

Forestry is the main economic activity in the sector. Recreational tourism activities come second.

== Geography ==
Lake Gabriel-Fleury has a length of 1.5 km (0.93 mi), a maximum width of 1.0 km (0.62 mi) and an altitude of 371 m (1,217 ft). The lake is mainly fed by the rivière de la Licorne (coming from the south) and by the discharge (coming from the north) of Lake Douvier. It has a large area of marsh around the eastern bay, as well as in the area of the confluence of the rivière de la Licorne. The mouth of Lake Gabriel-Fleury is located at:

- 2.5 km (1.6 mi) south of the Canadian National railway and route 167;
- 2.5 km (1.6 mi) east of Chigoubiche Lake;
- 12.1 km (7.5 mi) east of the mouth of Ashuapmushuan Lake (i.e. the head of Ashuapmushuan River).

The mouth of Gabriel-Fleury Lake is located on its west shore. From there, the current crosses the lake of the Grand Duc (altitude: 371 m (1,217 ft)) towards the south on 12.8 km (8.0 mi); then descends the discharge of the last lake on 7.3 km (4.5 mi), then across lake Ashuapmushuan on 12.8 km (8.0 mi); successively descends the course of the Ashuapmushuan River on 193 km (120 mi) (i.e. its full length), then crosses lac Saint-Jean eastward on 41.1 km (25.5 mi) (i.e. its full length), follows the course of the Saguenay River via la Petite Décharge on 172.3 km (107.1 mi) eastward to Tadoussac where it meets the estuary of Saint Lawrence

== Toponymy ==
The toponym "lac Gabriel-Fleury" was made official on December 5, 1968, by the Commission de toponymie du Québec.

== See also ==
- Le Domaine-du-Roy Regional County Municipality
- Lac-Ashuapmushuan, an unorganized territory
- Rivière de la Licorne, a stream
- Ashuapmushuan Lake, a body of water
- Ashuapmushuan River, a stream
- Lac Saint-Jean, a body of water
- List of lakes in Canada
