= Du Chef River =

Du Chef

Location
- Country: Canada
- Province: Quebec
- Region: Saguenay-Lac-Saint-Jean

Physical characteristics
- Source: Five Axe, Rivière-Mistassini, Quebec (unorganized territory), RCM Maria-Chapdelaine
  - location: Saguenay-Lac-Saint-Jean, Quebec
  - coordinates: 49°19′30″N 73°48′56″W
  - elevation: 454 m (1,490 ft)
- Mouth: Ashuapmushuan River
  - location: Lac-Ashuapmushuan, Quebec (unorganized territory), RCM Le Domaine-du-Roy, Saguenay-Lac-Saint-Jean, Quebec
  - coordinates: 49°20′21″N 73°23′36″W
  - elevation: 382 m (1,253 ft)
- Length: 155.6 km (96.7 mi)

Basin features
- Tributaries
  - left: (upstream); outlet of lake Marie; outlet of lakes Pierre and Loubinois; outlet of lake Lano; Crochue River; outlet of lake Bluche; outlet of lakes Hôtesse, Daguilne and Cardonnet; outlet of lake de l’Impasse; outlet of lakes Grun and du Petit Val; outlet of lake Diou; Nestaocano River; outlet of lakess Bagas and Jans; outlet of lake Nandy; Dorée River (Du Chef River); outlet of lake des Tadornes; De la Petite Meule River; outlet of lake Resserré; outlet of lake du Bastion; outlet of lake du Foiran.
  - right: (upstream); outlet of lake Mackard; outlet of lake Gez; outlet of lakes Fuaux and Ham; outlet of lake Géry; outlet of lakes Njaw, des Violettes, Ciouane and Vias; outlet of lakes Achain, outlet of lakes Malbo and Laix; outlet of lake Citoys; outlet of lake Dorat; Dobleau River; outlet of lake Myon; outlet of lake Toul; outlet of lake Unias; outlet of lakes Maray, Quint, Mendel, Houssereau and Vesin; De l’Épervier River; outlet of lakess Chard; and des Sizerins; outlet of lake de la Petite Grand-Mère; (tributary of "De la Petite Grand-Mère River"); outlet of lakes Ecly, Levé and Évisa; Chonard River; outlet of lake Complexe; outlet of Lake des Canots.

The Du Chef River is a tributary of the Ashuapmushuan River, flowing into the Saguenay-Lac-Saint-Jean, in Quebec, in Canada. The course of the river crosses the Regional County Municipality (RCM) of:

- Maria-Chapdelaine: unorganized territory of Rivière-Mistassini, Quebec;
- Le Domaine-du-Roy: unorganized territory of Lac-Ashuapmushuan, Quebec.

The "Du Chef River" is the main tributary of the Ashuapmushuan River. It runs in the cantons of Bonne, Gauvin, Duberger, Thibaudeau, Saracen, Denys, Piat, Corbeil, Guyart, Aiguillon, Théberge and Desgly. The lower part of the river course is the separation between the RCM Le Domaine-du-Roy and the MRC Maria-Chapdelaine. While the intermediate and upper part of the river passes in the RCM of Le Domaine-du-Roy along more or less the limit of the two MRC. Forestry is the main economic activity of this valley; recreational tourism activities, second.

Forest Road R0203 (North-South direction) serves the valley of Hilarion River, "Du Chef River" and Nestaocano River; this road starting south at the junction of route 167 which links Chibougamau to Saint-Félicien, Quebec.

The surface of "Du Chef River" is usually frozen from early November to mid-May, however, safe ice circulation is generally from mid-November to mid-April.

== Geography ==
The neighboring hydrographic slopes of the "Du Chef River" are:
- North side: Laganière Lake, File Axe Lake, Hilarion River, Mistassini Lake, Chalifour River, River of Revelation;
- east side: Ouasiemsca River, Crochue River, Azianne River, Papillon River, Brule-Neige River;
- south side: Ashuapmushuan River, Ashuapmushuan Lake, Chigoubiche Lake, Desgly Lake;
- west side: Hilarion River, Boisvert River (Normandin River), De l'Épervier River, Chonard River, Dobleau River, Des Grèves River.

The "Du Chef River" originates at the mouth of File Axe Lake (length: 16.1 kilometres (10.0 mi), altitude: 454 metres (1,490 ft)) which overlaps the townships of Gauvin and Bonne. The mouth of this head lake is located at:

- 16.6 kilometres (10.3 mi) east of "Baie du Poste" south of Mistassini Lake;
- 29.0 kilometres (18.0 mi) south-east of the village center of Mistissini (Cree village municipality);
- 48.2 kilometres (30.0 mi) northeast of a northeastern bay of Chibougamau Lake;
- 100.8 kilometres (62.6 mi) North of the mouth of the "Du Chef River" (confluence with the Ashuapmushuan River);
- 68.3 kilometres (42.4 mi) north-east of downtown Chibougamau;
- 197.6 kilometres (122.8 mi) northwest of the mouth of the Ashuapmushuan River (confluence with Lac Saint-Jean).

From the mouth of the File Axe Lake, the course of the "Du Chef River" flows over 155.6 kilometres (96.7 mi) according to the following segments:

Upper course of the "Du Chef River" (segment of 54.6 kilometres (33.9 mi))

- 2.6 kilometres (1.6 mi) southerly, crossing an unnamed lake (elevation: 450 metres (1,480 ft)), full length, to its mouth;
- 5.0 kilometres (3.1 mi) to the south, passing from the canton of Gauvin to that of Duberger, as well as crossing the Carbonneau Lake (length: 6.0 kilometres (3.7 mi); altitude: 447 metres (1,467 ft)) and another small unidentified lake, to its mouth;
- 2.3 kilometres (1.4 mi) south, to the north shore of Laganière Lake;
- 9.6 kilometres (6.0 mi) to the South, crossing Laganière Lake (length: 12.6 kilometres (7.8 mi); altitude: 436 metres (1,430 ft));
- 13.7 kilometres (8.5 mi) south, then south-west, to the outlet of Complex Lake (coming from the northwest);
- 3.5 kilometres (2.2 mi) southerly forming a hook to the east, to the confluence of the Chonard River (coming from the southwest);
- 17.9 kilometres (11.1 mi) of which 8.7 kilometres (5.4 mi) towards the South, then 9.2 kilometres (5.7 mi) towards the East, until the confluence of the De la Petite Meule River (coming from the North);

Intermediate Course of the "Du Chef River" (segment of 49.9 kilometres (31.0 mi))

From the confluence of the De la Petite Meule River, the course of the "Du Chef River" flows over:

- 12.8 kilometres (8.0 mi) south, to the confluence of the Little Grandmother's River (via Little Grandmother's Lake, coming from the West);
- 9.1 kilometres (5.7 mi) south, to the confluence of the De l’Épervier River (coming from the West);
- 15.9 kilometres (9.9 mi) southeasterly forming some serpentines, up to a bend in the river;
- 8.9 kilometres (5.5 mi) south forming three serpentines and cutting a forest road to the confluence of the Dobleau River;
- 1.6 kilometres (0.99 mi) east to the northern limit of the township of Guyart;
- 1.6 kilometres (0.99 mi) southerly in Guyart Township, forming a hook to the east, to the confluence of the Nestaocano River (coming from the North);

Lower course of "Du Chef River" (segment of 51.1 kilometres (31.8 mi))

From the confluence of the Nestaocano River, the course of the "Du Chef River" flows over:

- 12.4 kilometres (7.7 mi) southerly forming a hook of 1.5 kilometres (0.93 mi) towards the east at the end of the segment, to the northern limit of the township of Desgly;
- 9.0 kilometres (5.6 mi) northeasterly forming a curve to the north, to a river bend;
- 4.1 kilometres (2.5 mi) to the southeast, to the northern limit of the township of D'Aiguillon;
- 1.3 kilometres (0.81 mi) south-east in the township of Aiguillon, until the confluence of the Azianne River (coming from the North);
- 4.3 kilometres (2.7 mi) southerly in the township of Aiguillon, then the township of Guyart, to the northern limit of the township of Théberge;
- 18.5 kilometres (11.5 mi) southerly in Théberge Township to the northern boundary of Desgly Township;
- 1.5 kilometres (0.93 mi) southeasterly into the Desgly's Candle, to the mouth.

The confluence of the "Du Chef River" with the Normandin River is located at:

- 33.0 kilometres (20.5 mi) north-east of the mouth of the Normandin River (confluence with the Ashuapmushuan River;
- 25.8 kilometres (16.0 mi) of Chigoubiche Lake which is bypassed by the North via route 167 and the Canadian National Railway;
- 108.1 kilometres (67.2 mi) northwest of the mouth of the Ashuapmushuan River (confluence with lac Saint-Jean);
- 143.4 kilometres (89.1 mi) northwest of the mouth of lac Saint-Jean (confluence with the Saguenay River).

The "Du Chef River" flows to the north bank of the Ashuapmushuan River, which is 9.1 kilometres (5.7 mi) downstream from the confluence of the Mazarin River. From the confluence of the "Du Chef River", the current flows down the Ashuapmushuan River (length: 193 kilometres (120 mi), to the southeast, which flows to Saint-Félicien, Quebec on the west shore of Lac Saint-Jean.

The "Du Chef River" flows to the north bank of the Ashuapmushuan River, which is 9.1 kilometres (5.7 mi) downstream from the confluence of the Mazarin River. From the confluence of the "Du Chef River", the current flows down the Ashuapmushuan River (length: 193 kilometres (120 mi), to the southeast, which flows to Saint-Félicien, Quebec on the west shore of Lac Saint-Jean.

== Toponymy ==
The origin of this hydronym remains unknown. This name, which is in use at least in the nineteenth century, is indicated in particular on a map of the surveyor Henry O'Sullivan, drawn as a result of explorations carried out between 1897 and 1899. From the end of the seventeenth century, this Stream was used as one of the ordinary routes of travel between lakes Saint-Jean and Mistassini. Botanist André Michaux borrowed it in 1792.

This watercourse is designated "Shetshishkuesheu" by the Innu commconverty, meaning "river where there is shade".

The toponym "Rivière du Chef" was officialized on December 5, 1968, at the Commission de toponymie du Québec, when it was created.

== See also ==
- Saguenay River
- Lac Saint-Jean, a body of water
- Ashuapmushuan River, a watercourse
- Azianne River, a watercourse
- Nestaocano River, a watercourse
- De la Petite Meule River, a watercourse
- Chonard River, a watercourse
- De la Petite Grand-Mère River, a watercourse
- De l’Épervier River, a watercourse
- Dobleau River, a watercourse
- Rivière-Mistassini, Quebec, an unorganized territory
- Lac-Ashuapmushuan, Quebec, an unorganized territory
- Maria-Chapdelaine, a regional county municipality (RCM)
- Le Domaine-du-Roy, a regional county municipality (RCM)
- List of rivers of Quebec
