= Rivière à la Pêche =

River in Saguenay-Lac-Saint-Jean, Quebec, Canada

Location
- Country: Canada
- Province: Quebec
- Region: Saguenay-Lac-Saint-Jean
- Regional County Municipality: Le Domaine-du-Roy Regional County Municipality

Physical characteristics
- Source: Confluence of two mountain streams
  - location: Lac-Ashuapmushuan
  - coordinates: 48°53′50″N 73°18′28″W
  - elevation: 460 m (1,510 ft)
- Mouth: Chigoubiche River
  - location: Lac-Ashuapmushuan (unorganized territory)
  - coordinates: 48°59′18″N 73°16′32″W
  - elevation: 330 m (1,080 ft)
- Length: 19.2 km (11.9 mi)

Basin features
- Progression: Chigoubiche River, Ashuapmushuan River, Lac Saint-Jean, Saguenay River
- Tributaries
  - left: (upstream); discharge from Lake Ermont; discharge from Lake Gagnon; discharge from a group of lakes including the Congénères lakes.
  - right: (upstream); discharge from Lake Manerbe; discharge from a set of lakes including Cervière and Fiac; discharge from a set of lakes including Régis; Hélène and Lamarque.

The rivière à la Pêche is a tributary of Chigoubiche River, flowing in the unorganized territory of Lac-Ashuapmushuan in the Le Domaine-du-Roy Regional County Municipality, in the administrative region of Saguenay–Lac-Saint-Jean, in province of Quebec, in Canada.

The valley of the Rivière à la Pêche is mainly served by forest roads which connect northwards to route 167.

Forestry (mainly forestry) is the main economic activity in this valley; secondly, recreational tourism activities, mainly because of the Ashuapmushuan Wildlife Reserve.

== Geography ==
The Rivière à la Pêche has its source at the confluence of two mountain streams (altitude: 460 m (1,510 ft)).

This is located in a mountainous area in the unorganized territory of Lac-Ashuapmushuan, at:

- 2.5 km (1.6 mi) north-east of the course of the rivière du Pilet;
- 11.1 km (6.9 mi) south of the mouth of Rivière à la Pêche;
- 8.0 km (5.0 mi) south of the railway;
- 19.3 km (12.0 mi) southwest of the course of the Ashuapmushuan River.

From its source, the Rivière à la Pêche flows over 19.2 km (11.9 mi) with a drop of 130 m (430 ft), entirely in the forest zone, according to the following segments:

- 1.6 km (0.99 mi) towards the east in a valley more and more deep, until a bend of the river, corresponding to the discharge (coming from the south-east of a set of lakes including Régis, Hélène and Lamarque);
- 7.8 km (4.8 mi) north, first in a deep valley, forming a hook east, then north occasionally forming small coils at the end of the segment, up to the discharge ( coming from the west) from lakes Congénères, de l'Essaie and Miserable;
- 3.9 km (2.4 mi), winding through a forest plain, to the Canadian National railway;
- 5.9 km (3.7 mi) towards the northwest by forming small coils, collecting the discharge (coming from the west) of Lac Gagnon and the discharge (coming from the north) of Lac Manerbe, crossing the lac Dalpé (altitude: 330 m (1,080 ft)), by cutting route 167, collecting the discharge (coming from the west) of Lac Ermont, and bypassing an island (length: 0.7 km (0.43 mi)) at the end of the segment, up to its mouth.

The Rivière à la Pêche flows on the south bank of the Chigoubiche River. This confluence is located upstream of a series of rapids, and at:

- 12.6 km (7.8 mi) south-west of the mouth of the Chigoubiche River;
- 70.9 km (44.1 mi) northwest of downtown Saint-Félicien.

From the mouth of the Rivière à la Pêche, the current descends the course of the Chigoubiche river on 36.0 km (22.4 mi), the course of the Ashuapmushuan river on 59.8 km (37.2 mi), then cross lac Saint-Jean east on 41.1 km (25.5 mi) (i.e. its full length), take the course of the Saguenay River via la Petite Décharge on 172.3 km (107.1 mi) east to Tadoussac where it meets the estuary of Saint Lawrence.

== Toponymy ==
The toponym "rivière à la Pêche" was made official on December 5, 1968, at the Place Names Bank of the Commission de toponymie du Québec.

== See also ==
- List of rivers of Quebec
