= Grand Portage South-East River =

River in Saguenay-Lac-Saint-Jean, Quebec, Canada

Location
- Country: Canada
- Province: Quebec
- Region: Saguenay-Lac-Saint-Jean
- Regional County Municipality: Le Domaine-du-Roy Regional County Municipality

Physical characteristics
- Source: Demers lake
  - location: Lac-Ashuapmushuan
  - coordinates: 48°51′56″N 73°21′45″W
  - elevation: 497 m (1,631 ft)
- Mouth: Rivière du Grand Portage
  - location: Lac-Ashuapmushuan (unorganized territory)
  - coordinates: 48°52′53″N 73°24′54″W
  - elevation: 380 m (1,250 ft)
- Length: 6.8 km (4.2 mi)

Basin features
- Progression: Chigoubiche River, Ashuapmushuan River, Lac Saint-Jean, Saguenay River
- Tributaries
  - left: (upstream); Lavin stream; stream (coming from the south); outlet of Lac de la Peine (via Lac Marion).

The rivière du Grand Portage Sud-Est (English: Grand Portage South-East River) is a tributary of rivière du Grand Portage, flowing into the unorganized territory of Lac-Ashuapmushuan in the Le Domaine-du-Roy Regional County Municipality, in the administrative region of Saguenay–Lac-Saint-Jean, in the province of Quebec, in Canada.

The upper part of the valley of the Grand Portage Sud-Est river is mainly served by the forest road R0211 which goes up the valley of the rivière du Pilet. The lower part is served indirectly by forest road R0204 which connects north to route 167.

Forestry (mainly forestry) is the main economic activity in this valley; secondly, recreational tourism activities, mainly because of the Ashuapmushuan Wildlife Reserve.

== Geography ==
The Grand Portage Sud-Est river draws its source from Lac Demers (length: 2.2 km (1.4 mi); altitude: 497 m (1,631 ft)).

This spring is located in a mountainous area in the unorganized territory of Lac-Ashuapmushuan, at:

- 4.3 km (2.7 mi) east of the mouth of the Grand Portage Sud-Est river;
- 13.4 km (8.3 mi) south-east of the mouth of the rivière du Grand Portage;
- 12.4 km (7.7 mi) south of the old Frigon station of the Canadian National railway;
- 24.5 km (15.2 mi) southwest of the course of the Ashuapmushuan River.

From the mouth of Lac Demers, the Grand Portage Sud-Est river flows over 6.8 km (4.2 mi), with a drop of 117 m (384 ft), entirely in forest area, according to the following segments:

- 1.3 km (0.81 mi) first south on 0.5 km (0.31 mi) to Lake Marion; then west, crossing Lake Marion (length: 1.6 km (0.99 mi); altitude: 486 m (1,594 ft)), to its mouth;
- 2.3 km (1.4 mi) towards the west, forming coils and a loop towards the north, to a stream (coming from the south);
- 2.6 km (1.6 mi) first to the northwest, then to the west down the mountain, to the Lavin stream (coming from the south);
- 0.6 km (0.37 mi) north, up to its mouth.

The Rivière du Grand Porcharge Sud-Est flows onto the south bank of the Rivière du Grand Portage. This confluence is located at:

- 11.5 km (7.1 mi) south-east of the mouth of the Grand Portage river;
- 26.9 km (16.7 mi) south-west of the mouth of the Chigoubiche river;
- 79.8 km (49.6 mi) west of downtown Saint-Félicien.

From the mouth of the Rivière du Grand Portage Sud-Est, the current successively descends the course of the rivière du Grand Portage onto 18.0 km (11.2 mi), the course of the Chigoubiche River on 46.2 km (28.7 mi), the course of the Ashuapmushuan river over 59.8 km (37.2 mi), then cross lac Saint-Jean eastward on 41.1 km (25.5 mi) (i.e. its full length), follows the course of the Saguenay River via la Petite Décharge on 172.3 km (107.1 mi) eastward to Tadoussac where it merges with the estuary of Saint Lawrence.

== Toponymy ==
The toponym "rivière du Grand Portage Sud-Est" was made official on December 5, 1968, at the Place Names Bank of the Commission de toponymie du Québec.

== See also ==
- Lac-Ashuapmushuan, an unorganized territory
- Ashuapmushuan Wildlife Reserve
- Chigoubiche River
- Ashuapmushuan River
- Rivière du Grand Portage
- List of rivers of Quebec
