= Kanishushteu River =

Location
- Country: Canada
- Province: Quebec
- Region: Saguenay-Lac-Saint-Jean
- Regional County Municipality: Le Domaine-du-Roy Regional County Municipality

Physical characteristics
- Source: Lake Robinos
  - location: Lac-Ashuapmushuan
  - coordinates: 49°07′04″N 73°11′11″W
  - elevation: 366 m (1,201 ft)
- Mouth: Ashuapmushuan River
  - location: Lac-Ashuapmushuan
  - coordinates: 49°02′45″N 73°06′59″W
  - elevation: 260 m (850 ft)
- Length: 14.0 km (8.7 mi)

Basin features
- Progression: Ashuapmushuan River, Lac Saint-Jean, Saguenay River, Saint Lawrence River
- Tributaries
  - left: (upstream) discharge of the Pleasant, Mago and Mitrelles lakes, discharge of the Vertain lake.
  - right: (upstream) Kanatuashuekanutsh River, creek, Lake Suspendu outlet, creek.

The Kanishushteu River is a tributary of Ashuapmushuan River, flowing into the unorganized territory of Lac-Ashuapmushuan, in the Le Domaine-du-Roy Regional County Municipality, in the administrative region of Saguenay–Lac-Saint-Jean, in province of Quebec, in Canada.

The lower part of the Kanishushteu river valley is mainly served by a forest road; another forest road serves the upper part. These roads connect indirectly to route 167 which is located to the southwest.

Forestry (mainly forestry) is the main economic activity in this valley; second, recreational tourism activities. The course of this river is entirely located in the Ashuapmushuan Wildlife Reserve.

== Geography ==
The Kanishushteu River originates from the mouth of Robinos Lake (length: 0.64 km (0.40 mi); altitude: 366 m (1,201 ft)). This lake is enclosed between the mountains in a forest zone.

The mouth of Lake Robinos is located in a forest zone in the unorganized territory of Lac-Ashuapmushuan, at:

- 13.5 km (8.4 mi) northwest of the mouth of the Chigoubiche River;
- 4.3 km (2.7 mi) southwest of the course of the Ashuapmushuan River.

From the mouth of Lake Robinos, the Kanishushteu river flows on 14.0 km (8.7 mi) with a drop of 106 m (348 ft), entirely in forest area, according to the following segments:

- 1.7 km (1.1 mi) towards the northeast, collecting the discharge (coming from the north) of Lac Vertain, up to a bend in the river;
- 3.6 km (2.2 mi) towards the south-east, crossing an area of marshes and collecting the discharge (coming from the northeast) of three lakes: des Mitrelles, Magot and Agréable, up to the discharge (coming from the northwest) of Lac Suspendu;
- 5.3 km (3.3 mi) towards the south crossing two small lakes, collecting a stream (coming from the northwest), crossing a third lake (altitude: 316 m (1,037 ft)) in mid-segment and a small lake towards the end of the segment, to the confluence of the Kanatuashuekanutsh River (coming from the northwest);
- 3.4 km (2.1 mi) to the southeast relatively in a straight line, forming a hook to the northeast at the end of the segment, to its mouth.

The Kanishushteu River empties at the bottom of a small bay (length: 0.3 km (0.19 mi)) connected to a river bend on the southwest bank of the Ashuapmushuan River. This confluence is located at the foot of a series of rapids, at:

- 65.3 km (40.6 mi) north-west of downtown Saint-Félicien;
- 74.9 km (46.5 mi) northwest of the mouth of the Ashuapmushuan River.

From the mouth of the Kanishushteu River, the current descends the course of the Ashuapmushuan River on 92.9 km (57.7 mi), then crosses lac Saint-Jean eastward on 41.1 km (25.5 mi) (i.e. its full length), follows the course of the Saguenay River via la Petite Décharge on 172.3 km (107.1 mi) eastward to Tadoussac where it merges with the estuary of Saint Lawrence.

== Toponymy ==
The toponym “rivière Kanishushteu” was made official on December 2, 1982, at the Place Names Bank of the Commission de toponymie du Québec.

== See also ==
- Le Domaine-du-Roy Regional County Municipality
- Ashuapmushuan Wildlife Reserve
- Ashuapmushuan River
- Kanatuashuekanutsh River
- List of rivers of Quebec
