= Aigremont Lake =

Lake in Quebec, Canada

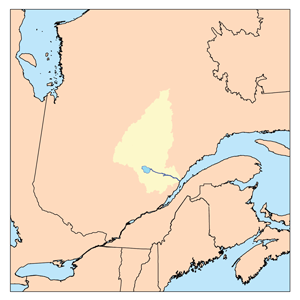
- Watershed of Saguenay River

- Location within Quebec
- Location: Lac-Ashuapmushuan, Quebec (non-organized territory), Le Domaine-du-Roy (RCM)
- Coordinates: 49°18′14″N 73°49′40″W
- Type: Natural
- Primary inflows: (clockwise); Outlet of lake Pilliard; outlet of the lakes du Marécage and Boismont; outlet of lakes Limace and Narbonne; outlet of lake Tendon; outlet of lake Aubertin.
- Primary outflows: Little Chief River.
- Basin countries: Canada
- Max. length: 7.7 kilometres (4.8 mi)
- Max. width: 5.5 kilometres (3.4 mi)
- Surface area: 9.67 kilometres (6.01 mi)
- Surface elevation: 397 metres (1,302 ft)

The Aigremont Lake is a freshwater body flowing out of the Little Chief River, flowing into the unorganized territory of Lac-Ashuapmushuan, Quebec, in the northwestern part of the Regional County Municipality (RCM) Le Domaine-du-Roy, in the Saguenay-Lac-Saint-Jean administrative region, in the province of Quebec, in Canada.

This lake straddles the townships of Aigremont and Denaut. It is entirely located in the Ashuapmushuan Wildlife Reserve. Its southwest shore is less than 10 kilometres (6.2 mi) from the former Nicabau Railway Station of the Canadian National Railway.

Forestry is the main economic activity of the sector. Recreational tourism activities come second.

The route 167 linking Chibougamau to Saint-Félicien, Quebec passes on the south shore of the lake. A forest road bypasses the lake. Farther south, the Canadian National Railway runs along the Normandin River, and approaches route 167 as it winds up to the northwest to Chibougamau.

The surface of Lake Aigremont is usually frozen from early November to mid-May, however safe ice circulation is generally from mid-November to mid-April.

== Geography ==
Lake Aigremont has a length of 7.7 kilometres (4.8 mi), a maximum width of 5.5 kilometres (3.4 mi) and an altitude of 397 metres (1,302 ft). This lake is mainly fed by five landfills which drain a total of eight surrounding lakes.

The mouth of Lake Aigremont is located at:

- 9.0 kilometres (5.6 mi) south-west of the mouth of the Little River of the Chef (confluence with the La Loche River);
- 11.8 kilometres (7.3 mi) west of the mouth of the La Loche River (confluence with the Ashuapmushuan River);
- 13.6 kilometres (8.5 mi) northwest of the mouth of the Normandin River (confluence with Ashuapmushuan Lake);
- 131.3 kilometres (81.6 mi) northwest of the mouth of the Ashuapmushuan River (confluence with lac Saint-Jean);
- 169.1 kilometres (105.1 mi) west of the mouth of lac Saint-Jean (confluence with the Saguenay River).

The main hydrographic slopes near Lake Aigremont are:

- North side: Little Chef River, Mignault Lake, Greves River, Chaudière Lake, Dobleau Lake, Vimont Lake (Lac-Ashuapmushuan);
- East side: La Loche River, Ashuapmushuan River;
- South side: Normandin River, Ashuapmushuan Lake, Denaut Lake, Marquette River;
- West side: Normandin River, Bouteroue Lake, Rohault Lake.

Lake Aigremont flows into the bottom of a bay (length: 2.0 kilometres (1.2 mi)) from the north shore of the lake. From there, the current flows down the Little River of the Chef on 4.6 kilometres (2.9 mi) to the North, crossing the "Débâcle Lake", north-east to the west bank from the "lac des Cantons" (English: Lake of the Cantons), then to the east crossing the latter lake. The current of the Little River of the Chef continues north-east on 9.1 kilometres (5.7 mi) when entering Cazeneuve Township, until the confluence of the La Loche River (Ashuapmushuan River).

From this last confluence, the current of the La Loche River (Ashuapmushuan) flows over the townships of Cazeneuve and Denault, to its confluence with the Ashuapmushuan River. The latter confluence is located at 16.5 kilometres (10.3 mi) downstream from the mouth of Ashuapmushuan Lake. Then, the current flows along the Ashuapmushuan River, first to the northeast, then to the southeast, which flows to Saint-Félicien, Quebec on the west bank of the Lac Saint-Jean.

== Toponymy ==
Formalized in 1925 by the Quebec Geography Commission, this hydronym evokes the work of life of François Clairambault d'Aigremont (1659-1728), acting intendant of Nouvelle-France. Toponymic variant: Lac de la Cache.

The toponym "Lake Aigremont" was made official on December 5, 1968 by the Commission de toponymie du Québec, either at the creation of this commission.

== See also ==
- Lac Saint-Jean, a body of water
- Ashuapmushuan River, a watercourse
- La Loche River, a watercourse
- Little Chief River, a watercourse
- Le Domaine-du-Roy, a regional county municipality (RCM)
- Ashuapmushuan Wildlife Reserve
- Lac-Ashuapmushuan, Quebec, an unorganized territory
- List of lakes in Canada
