= Mazarin River =

Mazarin

Location
- Country: Canada
- Province: Quebec
- Region: Saguenay-Lac-Saint-Jean

Physical characteristics
- Source: Mazarin Lake
  - location: Lac-Ashuapmushuan, Quebec (unorganized territory), RCM Le Domaine-du-Roy, Saguenay-Lac-Saint-Jean, Quebec
  - coordinates: 49°28′29″N 73°28′26″W
  - elevation: 327 m (1,073 ft)
- Mouth: Ashuapmushuan River
  - location: Lac-Ashuapmushuan, Quebec (unorganized territory), RCM Le Domaine-du-Roy, Saguenay-Lac-Saint-Jean, Quebec
  - coordinates: 49°23′17″N 73°28′12″W
  - elevation: 318 m (1,043 ft)
- Length: 15.1 km (9.4 mi)

Basin features
- Tributaries
  - left: (upstream); outlet of lake Gaël; outlet of lakes Penol and Étel; outlet of lakes Lama, Jacou, Maubeuge, Quievermon, Souste and Cais; outlet of lake Amou; outlet of lake Hénu; outlet of lake Ervy; outlet of lakes Robereau and Darle.
  - right: (upstream); outlet of lake Illy; outlet of lakes Ria and Mélamare; outlet of lake Nivars.

The Mazarin River is a tributary of the Ashuapmushuan River, flowing into the unorganized territory of Lac-Ashuapmushuan, Quebec, into the Regional County Municipality (MRC) of Le Domaine-du-Roy, in the administrative region of Saguenay-Lac-Saint-Jean, in Quebec, in Canada.

The Mazarin river flows entirely in the canton of Théberge. Forestry is the main economic activity of this valley; recreational tourism activities, second.

The Forest Road R0203 (North–south direction) serves the valley of the Mazarin River, the Hilarion River, the Du Chef River and the Nestaocano River; this road starting south at the junction of route 167 which links Chibougamau to Saint-Félicien, Quebec.

The surface of the Mazarin River is usually frozen from early November to mid-May, however, safe ice circulation is generally from mid-November to mid-April.

== Geography ==
The hydrographic slopes near the Mazarin river are:
- north side: Du Chef River, Hilarion River, Dobleau River;
- east side: Du Chef River, Desautels Creek, Brule-Neige River;
- south side: Ashuapmushuan River, Ashuapmushuan Lake, Chigoubiche Lake, Desgly Lake;
- west side: La Loche River (Ashuapmushuan River), Chaudière River (Normandin River), Hilarion River.

The Mazarin River originates at the mouth of lake Mazarin (length: 2.8 kilometres (1.7 mi) altitude: 327 metres (1,073 ft)). The mouth of this head lake is located at:

- 6.9 kilometres (4.3 mi) West of the Du Chef River;
- 9.6 kilometres (6.0 mi) north of the mouth of the Mazarin River (confluence with the Ashuapmushuan River);
- 38.5 kilometres (23.9 mi) north-east of the mouth of the Normandin River (confluence with Ashuapmushuan Lake);
- 123.5 kilometres (76.7 mi) northwest of the mouth of the Ashuapmushuan River (confluence with lac Saint-Jean).

From the mouth of the Mazarin Lake, the course of the Mazarin River flows on 15.1 kilometres (9.4 mi) according to the following segments:

- 1.4 kilometres (0.87 mi) southerly collecting the Nivars Lake outlet to the north shore of the Flexieux Lake;
- 3.0 kilometres (1.9 mi) southerly, crossing the Flexieux Lake (elevation: 318 metres (1,043 ft)) along its full length to its mouth;
- 4.3 kilometres (2.7 mi) south, then south-west, to the outlet (from the north-east) of lakes Lama, Maubeuge and Quievermon;
- 1.6 kilometres (0.99 mi) southerly forming a hook to the east, to the outlet (coming from the south-east) of lakes Étel and Penol;
- 4.2 kilometres (2.6 mi) winding up to the bridge of a forest road;
- 0.6 kilometres (0.37 mi) south, forming a serpentine, to its mouth.

The confluence of the Mazarin River with the Normandin River is located at:

- 31.6 kilometres (19.6 mi) north-east of the mouth of the Normandin River (confluence with the Ashuapmushuan River;
- 27.7 kilometres (17.2 mi) of Chigoubiche Lake which is bypassed by the North on route 167 and the Canadian National Railway;
- 116.2 kilometres (72.2 mi) northwest of the mouth of the Ashuapmushuan River (confluence with lac Saint-Jean);
- 150.8 kilometres (93.7 mi) northwest of the mouth of lac Saint-Jean (confluence with the Saguenay River).
The Mazarin River flows on the north bank of the Ashuapmushuan River, which is 9.1 kilometres (5.7 mi) upstream from the confluence of the Du Chef River. From the confluence of the Mazarin River, the current flows down the Ashuapmushuan River (length: 193 kilometres (120 mi), to the southeast, which flows to Saint-Félicien, Quebec on the west shore of Lac Saint-Jean.

== Toponymy ==
The toponym "Rivière Mazarin" was officialized on December 5, 1968, at the Commission de toponymie du Québec, when it was created.

== See also ==
- Saguenay River
- Lac Saint-Jean, a body of water
- Ashuapmushuan River, a watercourse
- Lac-Ashuapmushuan, Quebec, an unorganized territory
- Le Domaine-du-Roy, a regional county municipality (MRC)
- List of rivers of Quebec
