= Chigoubiche Lake =

Lake in Lac-Ashuapmushuan, Quebec, Canada

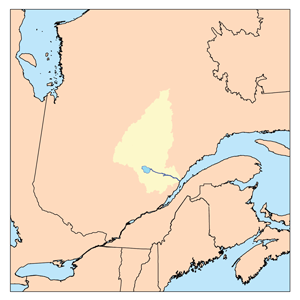
- Watershed of Saguenay River

- Location within Quebec
- Location: Lac-Ashuapmushuan, Quebec (unorganized territory), Le Domaine-du-Roy (RCM)
- Coordinates: 49°05′31″N 73°31′25″W
- Type: Natural
- Primary inflows: (clockwise); Outlet of lake Cyrène; outlet of lake Sampolo; outlet of lakes Fillé; and de la Popote; outlet of lakes Sérein and des Camomilles; outlet of lake Prétot; outlet of lakes Anne-Marie, des Sésies, Viane, Bilodeau, Prémian and Sullois; outlet of lake Roze; outlet of lakes Aulan, Boudria; (fed by 10 lakes on West shore such lake Rousson; and by 4 lakes on East shore), Entre-Deux and lake Desgly; (fed by 8 outlets of lakes).
- Primary outflows: Chigoubiche River.
- Basin countries: Canada
- Max. length: 7.7 kilometres (4.8 mi)
- Max. width: 5.5 kilometres (3.4 mi)
- Surface area: 9.67 kilometres (6.01 mi)
- Surface elevation: 397 metres (1,302 ft)

The Chigoubiche Lake is the main freshwater body at the head of the Chigoubiche River (slope of the Ashuapmushuan River), flowing into the unorganized territory of Lac-Ashuapmushuan, Quebec, in the Regional County Municipality (MRC) Le Domaine-du-Roy, in the administrative region of Saguenay-Lac-Saint-Jean, in the province of Quebec, in Canada.

Located halfway between Saint-Félicien, Quebec and Chibougamau, Lake Chigoubiche is the largest body of water in the Ashuapmushuan Wildlife Reserve. This lake straddles the townships of Lorne, Bochart, Avaugour and Argenson.

The Canadian National Railway runs along the northeast shore of the lake. The route 167 linking Chibougamau to Saint-Félicien, Quebec passes on the northeast shore of the lake. A forest road bypasses the lake.

Forestry is the main economic activity of the sector. Recreational tourism activities come second.

The surface of Lake Chigoubiche is usually frozen from early November to mid-May, however safe ice circulation is generally from mid-November to mid-April.

== Geography ==
Chigoubiche Lake has a length of 7.7 kilometres (4.8 mi), a maximum width of 5.5 kilometres (3.4 mi) and an altitude of 359 metres (1,178 ft). This lake is mainly fed by eight dumps which drain several tens of surrounding lakes. It is located at 7.1 kilometres (4.4 mi) east of Ashuapmushuan Lake.

The mouth of Lake Chigoubiche is located at:

- 25.8 kilometres (16.0 mi) south-west of the mouth of the Chigoubiche River (confluence with the Ashuapmushuan River);
- 88.4 kilometres (54.9 mi) northwest of the mouth of the Ashuapmushuan River (confluence with lac Saint-Jean);
- 129.2 kilometres (80.3 mi) west of the mouth of lac Saint-Jean (confluence with the Saguenay River).

The main hydrographic slopes near Chigoubiche Lake are:

- North side: Desgly Lake, Ashuapmushuan River, La Loche River (Ashuapmushuan River);
- East side: Ashuapmushuan River, Garlin Creek, Pomy Creek, Adon Creek, Kanatuashuekanutsh River, Kanishushteu River;
- South side: rivière du Grand Portage, Grand Portage South-West River, Lavin Creek, rivière du Pilet, Béland Lake;
- West side: rivière de la Licorne, Ashuapmushuan Lake, Côte Croche Creek, Marquette River.

The Lake Chigoubiche flows into a bay (length: 4.5 kilometres (2.8 mi)) in the shape of a horn in the southeastern part of the lake. From the mouth of the lake, the current flows down the Chigoubiche River on 40 kilometres (25 mi) eastwards, forming large streamers, to the west bank of the Ashuapmushuan River. This last confluence is located at 17.1 kilometres (10.6 mi) in downstream from the mouth of the rivière aux Brochets (Ashuapmushuan River).

From the mouth of the Chigoubiche River, the current flows along the Ashuapmushuan River to the southeast, which flows to Saint-Félicien, Quebec over the West shore of Lac Saint-Jean.

== Toponymy ==
During his 1732 expedition, surveyor Joseph-Laurent Normandin noted this toponym which derives from the Innu term "ushukupish", meaning "the place where les Betsis (Saw-Bees) brood". This toponym knows several graphic variants such as "Lake Chigobiche", "Lake Shecoubish" and "Ushukupis Shakahikan"; the latter form being the one used today by the Innus of Mashteuiatsh. From about 1950 to 1964, this body of water will be designated "Argenson Lake", after the name of the township where it is located.

At the time of Normandin, the region's Native people considered the river course and Chigoubiche Lake as the shortest way to reach the Ashuapmushuan Lake which is located a few kilometers farther west. According to his exploration notes, Normandin notes the abundance of furbearing animals in this area, including beavers, caribou, foxes and martens; hunters and traders frequenting this game region.

Today, in addition to still hunting in this territory, nature lovers also practice sport fishing, including pike and walleye.

The toponym "lac Chigoubiche" was formalized on December 5, 1968, by the Commission de toponymie du Québec.

== See also ==
- Lac Saint-Jean, a body of water
- Ashuapmushuan River, a watercourse
- Le Domaine-du-Roy, a regional county municipality (MRC)
- Lac-Ashuapmushuan, Quebec, an unorganized territory
- List of lakes in Canada
