= Grand Portage (disambiguation) =

Grand Portage National Monument, on the north shore of Lake Superior in northeastern Minnesota, preserves a vital center of fur trade activity and Anishinaabeg Ojibwe heritage.

Grand Portage may also refer to:

- Grand Portage (community), Minnesota
- Grand Portage, Minnesota
- Grand Portage River (disambiguation)
