= Rivière du Pilet =

River in Quebec, Canada

Location
- Country: Canada
- Province: Quebec
- Region: Saguenay-Lac-Saint-Jean
- Regional County Municipality: Le Domaine-du-Roy Regional County Municipality

Physical characteristics
- Source: Confluence of two mountain streams
  - location: Lac-Ashuapmushuan
  - coordinates: 48°46′14″N 73°21′28″W
  - elevation: 542 m (1,778 ft)
- Mouth: Chigoubiche River
  - location: Lac-Ashuapmushuan (unorganized territory)
  - coordinates: 48°58′48″N 73°22′04″W
  - elevation: 330 m (1,080 ft)
- Length: 24.1 km (15.0 mi)

Basin features
- Progression: Chigoubiche River, Ashuapmushuan River, Lac Saint-Jean, Saguenay River
- Tributaries
  - left: (upstream); discharge from a lake; discharge from Lake Loffre; discharge from Lake Fougaron; discharge from three small lakes.
  - right: (upstream); discharge from lakes Noël. Poirier and Rustan; discharge from lakes Congénères (two emissaries); discharge from lakes Gérard and Béland; discharge from Lac de la Taupe, stream.

The Rivière du Pilet is a tributary of Chigoubiche River, flowing in the unorganized territory of Lac-Ashuapmushuan, in the Le Domaine-du-Roy Regional County Municipality, in the administrative region of Saguenay–Lac-Saint-Jean, in province of Quebec, in Canada.

The valley of the Pilet river is mainly served by the forest road R0211 which goes up this valley to the Couleuvre lake where it curves towards the east to go to serve the upper part of the Vermillon River passing between Viau and Moïse lakes. This route connects north to route 167.

Forestry (mainly forestry) is the main economic activity in this valley; secondly, recreational tourism activities, mainly because of the Ashuapmushuan Wildlife Reserve.

== Geography ==
The Pilet river draws its source from Lake Odilon (length: 0.9 km (0.56 mi); altitude: 542 m (1,778 ft)).

This lake is located in a mountainous area in the unorganized territory of Lac-Ashuapmushuan, at:

- 3.0 km (1.9 mi) north-east of the course of the Trenche River;
- 23.3 km (14.5 mi) south-east of the mouth of the Pilet river;
- 22.3 km (13.9 mi) south of the railway;
- 30.3 km (18.8 mi) southwest of the course of the Ashuapmushuan River.

From its source, the Rivière du Pilet flows over 24.1 km (15.0 mi) with a drop of 212 m (696 ft), entirely in the forest zone, according to the following segments:

- 3.5 km (2.2 mi) north, crossing a marsh area, then crossing Lac du Pilet (length: 2.5 km (1.6 mi); altitude: 537 m (1,762 ft)) which comprises a narrow peninsula attached to the east shore, up to its mouth;
- 6.7 km (4.2 mi) first to the northeast, crossing Lake Jouvin (altitude: 536 m (1,759 ft)), to Lac Couleuvre (altitude: 531 m (1,742 ft)) over its full length; then to the north-west crossing the latter lake, entering a deep valley, collecting the discharge (coming from the east) of Lac de la Tente and the discharge (coming from the west) of Lake Fougaron, up to at the landfill (coming from the east of Béland, Beaucaire and Gérard lakes);
- 11.6 km (7.2 mi) towards the north-west, collecting the discharge (coming from the south) of the Loffre lake, the discharge (coming from the west) of the Minet lake, as well as the discharge (coming from the (east) of the Congénères lakes, to the discharge (coming from the east) of the Noël and Rustan lakes;
- 2.3 km (1.4 mi) towards the northwest relatively in a straight line, crossing route 167 at the end of the segment, up to its mouth.

The Pilet river flows on the south bank of the Chigoubiche River. This confluence is located upstream of a series of rapids, and at:

- 6.5 km (4.0 mi) east of Chigoubiche Lake;
- 19.9 km (12.4 mi) south-west of the mouth of the Chigoubiche River;
- 76.8 km (47.7 mi) northwest of downtown Saint-Félicien.

From the mouth of the Pilet river, the current descends the course of the Chigoubiche river on 45.4 km (28.2 mi), the course of the Ashuapmushuan river on 59.8 km (37.2 mi), then cross lac Saint-Jean eastward on 41.1 km (25.5 mi) (i.e. its full length), take the course of the Saguenay River via la Petite Décharge on 172.3 km (107.1 mi) east to Tadoussac where it meets the estuary of Saint Lawrence.

== Toponymy ==
The term "Pilet" turns out to be a species of duck from periartic regions. This term also turns out to be a family patronymic. designated in America "Pilet dit Jolicoeur" The descendants of this surname have come together in a family association.

The toponym “rivière du Pilet” was made official on December 5, 1968, at the Place Names Bank of the Commission de toponymie du Québec.

== See also ==
- List of rivers of Quebec
