= Kanatuashuekanutsh River =

Location
- Country: Canada
- Province: Quebec
- Region: Saguenay-Lac-Saint-Jean
- Regional County Municipality: Le Domaine-du-Roy Regional County Municipality

Physical characteristics
- Source: Lac des Sanicles
  - location: Lac-Ashuapmushuan
  - coordinates: 49°04′37″N 73°13′08″W
  - elevation: 354 m (1,161 ft)
- Mouth: Kanishushteu River
  - location: Lac-Ashuapmushuan
  - coordinates: 49°03′45″N 73°08′33″W
  - elevation: 290 m (950 ft)
- Length: 6.9 km (4.3 mi)

Basin features
- Progression: Kanishushteu River, Ashuapmushuan River, Lac Saint-Jean, Saguenay River, Saint Lawrence River
- Tributaries
  - left: (upstream) discharge from a lake, discharge from a lake, discharge from Lake Salignac, discharge from Lake Levaux, discharge from Lake Boulay.

The Kanatuashuekanutsh River is a tributary of Kanishushteu River, flowing into the unorganized territory of Lac-Ashuapmushuan, in the Le Domaine-du-Roy Regional County Municipality, in the administrative region of Saguenay–Lac-Saint-Jean, in province of Quebec, in Canada.

A few secondary logging roads serve the Kanatuashuekanutsh River Valley. These roads connect indirectly to route 167 which is located to the southwest.

Forestry (mainly forestry) is the main economic activity in this valley; second, recreational tourism activities. The course of this river crosses entirely the Ashuapmushuan Wildlife Reserve.

== Geography ==
The Kanatuashuekanutsh River originates from the mouth of Sanicles Lake (length: 0.9 km (0.56 mi); altitude: 354 m (1,161 ft)). This lake is enclosed between the mountains in a forest zone.

The mouth of Lac des Sanicles is located in a forest zone in the unorganized territory of Lac-Ashuapmushuan, at:

- 8.9 km (5.5 mi) north-west of the mouth of the Kanishushteu River;
- 20.0 km (12.4 mi) northeast of Chigoubiche Lake.

From the mouth of Sanicles Lake, the Kanatuashuekanutsh River flows 6.9 km (4.3 mi) towards the east with a drop of 64 m (210 ft), entirely in the forest zone, according to the following segments:

- 3.8 km (2.4 mi) towards the east in an increasingly deep valley, collecting the discharge (coming from the north-west) of Lake Levaux, to the discharge (coming from the north-west) from Lake Salignac;
- 3.1 km (1.9 mi) eastward crossing a forest plain, collecting the discharge (coming from the north-west) of a small lake, up to its mouth.

The Kanatuashuekanutsh River empties onto the southwest bank of the Kanishushteu River. This confluence is located at:

- 2.5 km (1.6 mi) west of the course of the Ashuapmushuan River
- 68.7 km (42.7 mi) northwest of downtown Saint-Félicien.

From the mouth of the Kanatuashuekanutsh River, the current flows down the course of the Kanishushteu River over 3.4 km (2.1 mi), the course of the Ashuapmushuan River over 92.9 km (57.7 mi), then cross lac Saint-Jean east on 41.1 km (25.5 mi) (i.e. its full length), take the course of the Saguenay River via la Petite Décharge on 172.3 km (107.1 mi) east to Tadoussac where it meets the estuary of Saint Lawrence.

== Toponymy ==
The toponym “rivière Kanatuashuekanutsh” was made official on December 2, 1982, at the Place Names Bank of the Commission de toponymie du Québec.

== See also ==
- Le Domaine-du-Roy Regional County Municipality
- Ashuapmushuan Wildlife Reserve
- Ashuapmushuan River
- Kanishushteu River
- List of rivers of Quebec
