= Vermillon River (Chigoubiche River tributary) =

River in Saguenay-Lac-Saint-Jean, Quebec, Canada

Location
- Country: Canada
- Province: Quebec
- Region: Saguenay-Lac-Saint-Jean
- Regional County Municipality: Le Domaine-du-Roy Regional County Municipality

Physical characteristics
- Source: Lake du Kakawi
  - location: Lac-Ashuapmushuan
  - coordinates: 48°45′16″N 73°16′04″W
  - elevation: 542 m (1,778 ft)
- Mouth: Chigoubiche River
  - location: Lac-Ashuapmushuan (unorganized territory)
  - coordinates: 49°00′26″N 73°08′09″W
  - elevation: 280 m (920 ft)
- Length: 45.0 km (28.0 mi)

Basin features
- Progression: Chigoubiche River, Ashuapmushuan River, Lac Saint-Jean, Saguenay River
- Tributaries
  - left: (upstream); 2 streams; discharge from a small lake; 4 streams; discharge from Lac Mélincourt; discharge from a set of lakes including Lake Moïse; stream, discharge from a set of lakes; 2 streams; discharge from a set of lakes including Viau and Recourbé; discharge from Lake Danaé (via Lake Persée); 2 discharge from lakes.
  - right: (upstream); discharge of a set of lakes including Lac Croche; discharge of a few lakes; discharge of Lac de la Loutre; discharge of Lac du Pinson; stream, discharge of Lac Fauve; 2 streams; discharge of a set of lakes including Lac du Hummingbird; Lac du Carouge and Lac du Moineau; discharge from lakes Cuzon and Fourdrain; discharge from Lake Andromède; discharge from lakes Béost and Oiron.

The Vermillon River is a tributary of Chigoubiche River, flowing in the unorganized territory of Lac-Ashuapmushuan in the Le Domaine-du-Roy Regional County Municipality, in the administrative region of Saguenay–Lac-Saint-Jean, in province of Quebec, in Canada.

The Vermillon River valley is mainly served by forest roads which connect northward to route 167.

Forestry (mainly forestry) is the main economic activity in this valley; recreotourism activities, second, mainly because of the Ashuapmushuan Wildlife Reserve.

== Geography ==
The Vermillon River has its source at the mouth of Vermillon Lake (length: 0.65 km (0.40 mi) triangular in shape; altitude: 579 m (1,900 ft)).

The mouth of Lake Vermillon is located in a forest zone in the unorganized territory of Lac-Ashuapmushuan, at:

- 5.0 km (3.1 mi) north-east of the course of the Trenche River;
- 34.0 km (21.1 mi) south of the mouth of the Vermillon river;
- 22.7 km (14.1 mi) south of the railway;
- 31.8 km (19.8 mi) south of the course of the Ashuapmushuan River.

From the mouth of Lake Vermillon, the Vermillon River flows over 45.0 km (28.0 mi) with a drop of 299 m (981 ft), entirely in the forest zone, according to the following segments:

- 3.7 km (2.3 mi) northward collecting two discharges (coming from the west) of small lakes, crossing Persée lake (length: 1.3 km (0.81 mi); altitude: 556 m (1,824 ft)) at the end of the segment, up to its mouth. Note: Lake Persée collecting from the northwest the discharge of Lake Danaé;
- 10.0 km (6.2 mi) towards the north, relatively in a straight line (occasionally forming small coils) in a steep-sided valley, collecting the discharge (coming from the south-east) of lakes Béost and Oiron, collecting the discharge of a set of lakes including Viau and Recourbé, forming a small hook to the east to collect the discharge (coming from the northeast) of Lake Andromeda, up to a bend in the river, corresponding to the discharge of the lake Moses (coming from the west);
- 5.8 km (3.6 mi) towards the east, forming a loop towards the north, then bend towards the south-east in order to circumvent a mountain, until a bend in the river (corresponding to the discharge (coming from the southwest) of Lake Fourdrain);
- 10.6 km (6.6 mi) first north to a bend in the river; forming a large loop to the east by collecting the discharge (coming from the southeast) of Vacillant lake, collecting nine streams (coming from the east), collecting the discharge (coming from the north) of Lake Melincourt; then curving towards the north-west collecting the discharge (coming from the east) of Lac des Pinson; collecting the discharge (coming from the southwest) of Lac Maillardet, crossing the Canadian National railway, to a bend in the river;
- 3.0 km (1.9 mi) eastward relatively in a straight line, gradually moving away from the railroad path and collecting the discharge (coming from the north of Lac des Ventis), and cutting the route 167, up to the Fernoël stream (coming from the south);
- 11.9 km (7.4 mi) forming a loop to the east at the start of the segment, then to the north relatively in a straight line but forming small coils, collecting the discharge (coming from the south-east) of the lakes Julien and Martin, by collecting the discharge (coming from the west) of lakes Buvilly and Centaure, by collecting the discharge (coming from the southeast) of lakes Poussard, Canivet and Croche, up to its mouth.

The Vermillon river flows on the south bank of the Chigoubiche River. This confluence is located upstream of a series of rapids, and at:

- 2.4 km (1.5 mi) west of the mouth of the Chigoubiche River;
- 63.5 km (39.5 mi) northwest of downtown Saint-Félicien.

From the mouth of the Vermillon River, the current descends the course of the Chigoubiche River on 2.9 km (1.8 mi), the course of the Ashuapmushuan River on 59.8 km (37.2 mi), then crosses the lac Saint-Jean eastward on 41.1 km (25.5 mi) (i.e. its full length), follows the course of the Saguenay River via la Petite Décharge on 172.3 km (107.1 mi) east to Tadoussac where it meets the estuary of Saint Lawrence

== Toponymy ==
The toponym “Vermillon River” was made official on December 5, 1968, at the Place Names Bank of the Commission de toponymie du Québec.

== See also ==
- Ashuapmushuan Wildlife Reserve
- Chigoubiche River
- Ashuapmushuan River
- List of rivers of Quebec
