= Grand Portage South-West River =

River in Saguenay-Lac-Saint-Jean, Quebec, Canada

Location
- Country: Canada
- Province: Quebec
- Region: Saguenay-Lac-Saint-Jean
- Regional County Municipality: Le Domaine-du-Roy Regional County Municipality

Physical characteristics
- Source: Hary lake
  - location: Lac-Ashuapmushuan
  - coordinates: 48°46′46″N 73°33′11″W
  - elevation: 569 m (1,867 ft)
- Mouth: Rivière du Grand Portage
  - location: Lac-Ashuapmushuan (unorganized territory)
  - coordinates: 48°52′06″N 73°29′02″W
  - elevation: 430 m (1,410 ft)
- Length: 17.7 km (11.0 mi)

Basin features
- Progression: Chigoubiche River, Ashuapmushuan River, Lac Saint-Jean, Saguenay River
- Tributaries
  - left: (upstream); discharge of a steam (coming from south-west).
  - right: (upstream); discharge of a stream (coming from east); discharge of a stream (coming from south-east).

The rivière du Grand Portage Sud-Ouest (English: Grand Portage South-West River) is a tributary of rivière du Grand Portage, flowing into the unorganized territory of Lac-Ashuapmushuan in the Le Domaine-du-Roy Regional County Municipality, in the administrative region of Saguenay–Lac-Saint-Jean, in the province of Quebec, in Canada.

The valley of the Grand Portage Sud-Ouest river is mainly served by the forest road R0204 which goes up all this valley and connects to the south to the road R0406. Route R0204 connect north to route 167

Forestry (mainly forestry) is the main economic activity in this valley; secondly, recreational tourism activities, mainly because of the Ashuapmushuan Wildlife Reserve.

== Geography ==
The Grand Portage Sud-Ouest river draws its source from Lake Hary (length: 0.7 km (0.43 mi); altitude: 569 m (1,867 ft)).

This spring is located in a mountainous area in the unorganized territory of Lac-Ashuapmushuan, at:

- 0.4 km (0.25 mi) east of forest road R024;
- 5.5 km (3.4 mi) east of the course of the rivière du Grand Portage;
- 27 km (17 mi) southwest of the old Frigon station of the Canadian National railway;
- 41.3 km (25.7 mi) southwest of the course of the Ashuapmushuan River.

From the mouth of Lake Hary, the Grand Portage Sud-Ouest river flows over 17.7 km (11.0 mi) with a drop of 139 m (456 ft), entirely in forest areas, according to the following segments:

- 7.8 km (4.8 mi) towards the north, in particular crossing Lake Odile (length: 3.5 km (2.2 mi) elongated in shape, with two widenings; altitude: 561 m (1,841 ft)), up to a bend in the river;
- 2.9 km (1.8 mi) eastward through the north side of a mountain whose summit reaches 640 m (2,100 ft), until the discharge (coming from the south) of a set of lakes;
- 7.0 km (4.3 mi) towards the north first in a sometimes steep-sided valley, collecting a stream (coming from the southeast) and another stream (coming from the east), forming a few large coils irregular, and by cutting the forest road R0204 at the end of the segment, to its mouth.

The Rivière du Grande Portage Sud-Ouest flows onto the south bank of the Rivière du Grand Portage. This confluence is located at:

- 13.5 km (8.4 mi) southeast of the mouth of the Grand Portage river;
- 32.0 km (19.9 mi) southwest of the mouth of the Chigoubiche River;
- 80.1 km (49.8 mi) west of downtown Saint-Félicien.

From the mouth of the Grand Portage Sud-Ouest river, the current successively descends the course of the Grand Portage river on 24.8 km (15.4 mi), the course of the Chigoubiche river on 46.2 km (28.7 mi), the course of the Ashuapmushuan River over 59.8 km (37.2 mi), then cross lac Saint-Jean eastward on 41.1 km (25.5 mi) (i.e. its full length), follows the course of the Saguenay River via la Petite Décharge on 172.3 km (107.1 mi) east to Tadoussac where it meets the estuary of Saint Lawrence.

== Toponymy ==
The toponym "rivière du Grand Portage Sud-Ouest" was made official on December 5, 1968, at the Place Names Bank of the Commission de toponymie du Québec.

== See also ==
- Lac-Ashuapmushuan, an unorganized territory
- Ashuapmushuan Wildlife Reserve
- Chigoubiche River
- Ashuapmushuan River
- Rivière du Grand Portage
- List of rivers of Quebec
