= La Loche River (Ashuapmushuan River tributary) =

La Loche

Location
- Country: Canada
- Province: Quebec
- Region: Saguenay-Lac-Saint-Jean

Physical characteristics
- Source: Rivel Lake
  - location: Lac-Ashuapmushuan, Quebec (unorganized territory), MRC Le Domaine-du-Roy, Saguenay-Lac-Saint-Jean, Quebec
  - coordinates: 49°30′26″N 73°41′30″W
  - elevation: 401 m (1,316 ft)
- Mouth: Ashuapmushuan River
  - location: Lac-Ashuapmushuan, Quebec (unorganized territory), MRC Le Domaine-du-Roy, Saguenay-Lac-Saint-Jean, Quebec
  - coordinates: 49°17′21″N 73°39′50″W
  - elevation: 366 m (1,201 ft)
- Length: 32.8 km (20.4 mi)

Basin features
- Tributaries
  - left: (upstream); outlet of lakes Airan, Plomion, Géronce, Clémont, Villeret, des Crises, en Contre-Bas, Billio, Juvinas and Viville; outlet of a set of lakes such Le Bas, Narp, Tune, Petit lac Cheffois, Cheffois, Alban, Bourgerie, Bouan, Épinal, Rônai and Job; outlet of lakes Cresto and Le Mass; outlet of lake Ascou; outlet of lake Rupalais.
  - right: (upstream); outlet of lake Gaud; outlet of lake de l’Achéron; outlet of Little Chef River; outlet of lakess Lavaur; outlet of lakes Moulevin and Lanteuil; outlet of lakes Nicouse, Asnois, Edilot and Petit lac Edilot; outlet of lakes Puyperoux, Gonesse and Burbure.

The La Loche River is a tributary of the Ashuapmushuan River, flowing into the unorganized territory of Ashuapmushuan Lake, into the Regional County Municipality (RCM) of Le Domaine-du-Roy, in the administrative region of Saguenay-Lac-Saint-Jean, in Quebec, in Canada.

"La Loche River" flows in the townships of Le Ber, Cazeneuve, Mignault and Denault. The lower part of the river crosses the Ashuapmushuan Wildlife Reserve. Forestry is the main economic activity of this valley; recreational tourism activities, second.

The forest road R0203 (North-South direction) serves the lower part of the La Loche river valley; this road begins at the junction of route 167 which links Chibougamau to Saint-Félicien, Quebec. Going up north, the R0203 road branches off to the northeast to reach the Hilarion River.

The surface of La Loche River is usually frozen from early November to mid-May, however, safe ice circulation is generally from mid-November to mid-April.

== Geography ==
The surrounding hydrographic slopes of the La Loche River are:
- north side: Hilarion River, Dobleau River, Dobleau Lake, Vimont Lake (Lac-Ashuapmushuan), Epervier River, Hogan River;
- east side: Mazarin River, Greve River, Hilarion River, Chief River, Ashuapmushuan River;
- south side: Ashuapmushuan River, Ashuapmushuan Lake, Chiboubiche Lake, Marquette River;
- west side: Aigremont Lake, Little Chef River, Nicabau Lake, Rohault Lake, Bouteroue Lake, Tonnerre River (Normandin River).

The La Loche River originates at the mouth of Rivel Lake (length: 0.6 kilometres (0.37 mi), altitude: 401 metres (1,316 ft)) located in the township of Le Ber. The mouth of this head lake is located at:

- 24.3 kilometres (15.1 mi) northwest of the mouth of the "La Loche River" (confluence with the Ashuapmushuan River);
- 20.7 kilometres (12.9 mi) northwest of the mouth of the Mazarin River;
- 34.6 kilometres (21.5 mi) north of the mouth of the Normandin River (confluence with Ashuapmushuan Lake);
- 136 kilometres (85 mi) northwest of the mouth of the Ashuapmushuan River (confluence with Lac Saint-Jean).

From the mouth of Rivel Lake, the "La Loche River" flows over 32.8 kilometres (20.4 mi), according to the following segments:

Upper course of La Loche River (segment of 13.3 kilometres (8.3 mi))

- 3.0 kilometres (1.9 mi) easterly passing the north side of a mountain whose summit reaches 548 metres (1,798 ft) to the outlet of Rupalais Lake (coming from the North);
- 4.4 kilometres (2.7 mi) southwesterly from the east side of this mountain to a small lake receiving the dump (coming from the north-west) of Lakes Puyperoux, Gonesse and Burbure;
- 2.0 kilometres (1.2 mi) southwesterly on the east side of a mountain with a peak of 441 metres (1,447 ft) to the north shore of Cazeneuve Lake;
- 3.9 kilometres (2.4 mi) southwesterly across Lake Cazeneuve (elevation: 385 metres (1,263 ft)) on its full length;

Lower course of La Loche River (segment of 19.5 kilometres (12.1 mi))

- 7.1 kilometres (4.4 mi) to the south, in particular, by crossing the Lothman lakes at their full length (length: 2.1 metres (6 ft 11 in); altitude: 385 metres (1,263 ft)) and Chorel (length: 0.6 metres (2 ft 0 in); altitude: 385 metres (1,263 ft)), as well as cutting a forest road at the end of the segment, until the confluence of the Little Chief River (coming from the Southwest);
- 3.0 kilometres (1.9 mi) southeasterly to the northern limit of the township of Denault;
- 9.4 kilometres (5.8 mi) southerly in Denault Township forming an easterly curve at the beginning of the segment to its mouth.

The confluence of the "La Loche River" with the Ashuapmushuan River is located at:

- 12.9 kilometres (8.0 mi) north-east of the mouth of Ashuapmushuan Lake;
- 118.9 kilometres (73.9 mi) northwest of the mouth of the Ashuapmushuan River (confluence with Lac Saint-Jean);
- 156.9 kilometres (97.5 mi) northwest of the mouth of lac Saint-Jean (confluence with the Saguenay River).
The La Loche River flows into a river hook on the north shore of the Ashuapmushuan River, which is 4.9 kilometres (3.0 mi) downstream of the route 167. From this confluence, the current flows down the Ashuapmushuan River (length: 193 kilometres (120 mi), to the northeast, then to the south-east, which flows to Saint-Félicien, Quebec on the west shore of Lac Saint-Jean.

== Toponymy ==
Formerly, this river has been designated "River aux Aulnes".

The toponym "La Loche River" was formalized on December 5, 1968, at the Commission de toponymie du Québec, when it was created.

== See also ==
- Ashuapmushuan River, a watercourse
- Ashuapmushuan Lake, a body of water
- Little Chief River, a watercourse
- Lac-Ashuapmushuan, Quebec, an unorganized territory
- Le Domaine-du-Roy, a regional county municipality (MRC)
