= Rivière du Grand Portage =

River in Saguenay-Lac-Saint-Jean, Quebec, Canada

Location
- Country: Canada
- Province: Quebec
- Region: Saguenay-Lac-Saint-Jean
- Regional County Municipality: Le Domaine-du-Roy Regional County Municipality

Physical characteristics
- Source: Mountain lake
  - location: Lac-Ashuapmushuan
  - coordinates: 48°42′15″N 73°31′25″W
  - elevation: 623 m (2,044 ft)
- Mouth: Chigoubiche River
  - location: Lac-Ashuapmushuan (unorganized territory)
  - coordinates: 48°59′08″N 73°22′35″W
  - elevation: 350 m (1,150 ft)
- Length: 62.4 km (38.8 mi)

Basin features
- Progression: Chigoubiche River, Ashuapmushuan River, Lac Saint-Jean, Saguenay River
- Tributaries
  - left: (upstream); discharge from Lake Laramée; mountain stream; discharge from Lake Renaudot (mountain stream); river from Lac des Anophèles; discharge from a set of lakes including Lake Quirouet; Gaudent, Celoux; stream draining in particular Lake Drevant; discharge from the lake Hecate; discharge of a set of lakes including Roselins, Domprel and Altair; stream; discharge from Lake Néré (via Lac Meilleur); discharge (via Lac Meilleur) from a set of lakes including Duchouquet, du Sabot and Nelly.
  - right: (upstream); mountain stream; South-East Grand Portage river; mountain stream; discharge from Lac des Vergerettes; mountain stream; Grand Portage South-West river; mountain stream; discharge from Lake Égérie; discharge from Lake Sagelat; discharge from Agriles, Tom and Élieudes lakes; discharge (via Lac Meilleur) of a set of lakes including Foins, Roland, Nita and Jean; discharge of three small lakes.

The rivière du Grand Portage (English: Grand Portage River) is a tributary of Chigoubiche River, flowing into the unorganized territory of Lac-Ashuapmushuan in the Le Domaine-du-Roy Regional County Municipality, in the administrative region of Saguenay–Lac-Saint-Jean, in province of Quebec, in Canada.

The valley of the Grand Portage river is mainly served by the forest road R0204 which goes up all this valley and connects towards the south to the road R0406. The route R0204 connect north to route 167.

Forestry (mainly forestry) is the main economic activity in this valley; secondly, recreational tourism activities, mainly because of the Ashuapmushuan Wildlife Reserve.

== Geography ==
The Grand Portage River draws its source from an unidentified lake (length: 1.3 km (0.81 mi); altitude: 623 m (2,044 ft)).

This spring is located in a mountainous area in the unorganized territory of Lac-Ashuapmushuan, at:

- 2.9 km (1.8 mi) east of forest road R024;
- 33.1 km (20.6 mi) south-east of the mouth of the Grand Portage river;
- 33.1 km (20.6 mi) south of the old Frigon station of the Canadian National railway;
- 44.4 km (27.6 mi) southwest of the course of the Ashuapmushuan River.

From its source, the Grand Portage river flows over 62.4 km (38.8 mi) with a drop of 273 m (896 ft), entirely in the forest zone, according to the following segments:

Upper course of the Grand Portage river (37.6 km (23.4 mi) segment)

- 8.6 km (5.3 mi) towards the west, in particular by crossing a first lake (length: 1.3 km (0.81 mi); altitude: 595 m (1,952 ft)), then a second lake (altitude: 589 m (1,932 ft)), by cutting forest road R024 (north–south direction), to the end of a bay on the west shore of Lac Meilleur; then north-west, crossing Meilleur Lake (length: 3.5 km (2.2 mi); altitude: 556 m (1,824 ft)), to its mouth;
- 8.2 km (5.1 mi) first to the north-west along the foot of the mountains, forming several small irregular coils, crossing Poodle lake (altitude: 545 m (1,788 ft)) at the start of the segment, by collecting the discharge (coming from the southwest) of a lake, the discharge of Lake Élieudes (coming from the north), the discharge (coming from the southwest) of Lake Bélus and the discharge (coming from northeast) of lac Sagelat, to the south shore of lac Lancelot;
- 11.5 km (7.1 mi) north (oriented slightly east) in a deep valley, crossing Lancelot lake (length: 2.0 km (1.2 mi); altitude: 523 m (1,716 ft)), by collecting the discharge (coming from the east) of Lake Égérie, the discharge of lakes Poupas and Hécate, the discharge of Lake Fouju, the discharge of a set of lakes including Lac des Grèbes, up to the confluence of a stream (coming from the northeast). Note: Lake Lancelot receives on the west side the discharge of Lake Altair and the discharge (coming from the north) of Lake Joussé;
- 5.9 km (3.7 mi) towards the north-east, collecting the discharge (coming from the north-west) of a set of lakes in particular Quirouet, Gaudet, Guélard and Dalou, up to a corresponding river bend at the outlet (coming from the north-west) of Lac des Anophèles;
- 3.4 km (2.1 mi) eastward crossing some rapids, forming a small loop northward, to the confluence of the Grand Portage South-West River (coming from the south);

Lower course of the Grand Portage river (24.8 km (15.4 mi) segment)

- 6.8 km (4.2 mi) to the northeast, forming a large curve to the northwest to go around a mountain with steep cliffs (southeast side of the river), forming a hook to the 'east, by collecting the discharge (coming from the south-east) of the lake of Chaland, by collecting the discharge (coming from the west) of the lake Laramée, and curving towards the east to circumvent a mountain, until the confluence of the Grand Portage South-East River (coming from the south);
- 18.0 km (11.2 mi) northward in a sometimes steep-sided valley, forming a few large irregular coils in the middle of the segment where it crosses areas of marshes, and cutting the route 167 at the end of the segment, up to its mouth.

The Grand Portage river empties on the southwest bank of the Chigoubiche River, opposite the railway. This confluence is located at:

- 5.3 km (3.3 mi) east of Chigoubiche Lake;
- 20.2 km (12.6 mi) south-west of the mouth of the Chigoubiche River;
- 77.9 km (48.4 mi) northwest of downtown Saint-Félicien.

From the mouth of the Grand Portage river, the current descends the course of the Chigoubiche river on 46.2 km (28.7 mi), the course of the Ashuapmushuan river on 59.8 km (37.2 mi), then cross lac Saint-Jean east on 41.1 km (25.5 mi) (i.e. its full length), take the course of the Saguenay River via la Petite Décharge on 172.3 km (107.1 mi) east to Tadoussac where it meets the estuary of Saint Lawrence.

== Toponymy ==
The toponym "rivière du Grand Portage" was made official on December 5, 1968, at the Place Names Bank of the Commission de toponymie du Québec.

== See also ==
- List of rivers of Quebec
