= Chigoubiche River =

Location
- Country: Canada
- Province: Quebec
- Region: Saguenay-Lac-Saint-Jean
- Regional County Municipality: Le Domaine-du-Roy Regional County Municipality

Physical characteristics
- Source: Chigoubiche Lake
  - location: Lac-Ashuapmushuan, Quebec (unorganized territory)
  - coordinates: 48°59′35″N 73°27′10″W
  - elevation: 360 m (1,180 ft)
- Mouth: Ashuapmushuan River
  - location: Lac-Ashuapmushuan, Quebec (unorganized territory)
  - coordinates: 49°00′34″N 73°06′07″W
  - elevation: 251 m (823 ft)
- Length: 54.6 km (33.9 mi)

Basin features
- Progression: Ashuapmushuan River, Lac Saint-Jean, Saguenay River, Gulf of Saint Lawrence
- Tributaries
  - left: (upstream); outlet of lakes du Populage, Astrue, Fenris and Baufroy; outlet of lakes Bresse and Végiar; outlet of lakes Moutrel and Christain; outlet of lake Allègre; outlet of lakes Tellière, des Myriques, Dulude, Millam, Hirbour, Hopi and Allègre; outlet of lacs du Poisson Blanc, Thibeault, Livet, Égée, Aropel and Vein; outlet Turenne creek; outlet of lake de Vanchy; Adon Creek (emptying upstream of an island); Garlin Creek.
  - right: (upstream); Vermillon River (Chigoubiche River tributary); outlet of lakes en Or and des Tronchets; À la Pêche River (Chigoubiche River); outlet of lakes du Criquet and du Moulin; Pilet River; Du Grand Portage River; outlet of lakes Accons, Carmen and Hydra.

The Chigoubiche River is a tributary of the Ashuapmushuan River, flowing into the unorganized territory of Lac-Ashuapmushuan, Quebec and then into the Regional County Municipality (RCM) of Le Domaine-du-Roy, in the administrative region of Saguenay-Lac-Saint-Jean, in the province of Quebec, in Canada.

The Chigoubiche River flows in the townships of Argenson, Ailleboust and Chomedey. Forestry is the main economic activity of this valley; recreational tourism activities, second.

The route 167 which connects Chibougamau to Saint-Félicien, Quebec passes on the north-east side of Chigoubiche Lake and crosses the Chigoubiche River. The upper part of the river is served by the forest road R0212, R0203 and R0204.

The surface of the Chigoubiche River is usually frozen from early November to mid-May, however, safe ice circulation is generally from mid-November to mid-April.

== Geography ==
The surrounding hydrographic slopes of the Chigoubiche River are:
- north side: Garlin Creek, Pomy Creek, Kanatuashuekanutsh River, Ashuapmushuan River;
- east side: Ashuapmushuan River, Desautels Creek, Micosas River;
- South side: Ashuapmushuan River, Pilet River, rivière à la Pêche (Chigoubiche River tributary), Grand Portage River;
- west side: De La Licorne River, Chigoubiche Lake.

The Chigoubiche River originates at the mouth of Lake Chigoubiche (length: 7.7 kilometres (4.8 mi); altitude: 359 metres (1,178 ft)). The mouth of this head lake is located at:

- 25.8 kilometres (16.0 mi) south-west of the mouth of the Chigoubiche River (confluence with the Ashuapmushuan River);
- 88.4 kilometres (54.9 mi) northwest of the mouth of the Ashuapmushuan River (confluence with lac Saint-Jean);
- 129.2 kilometres (80.3 mi) west of the mouth of lac Saint-Jean (confluence with the Saguenay River).

From the mouth of the Chigoubiche Lake, the course of the Chigoubiche River flows over 54.6 kilometres (33.9 mi) according to the following segments:

Upper course of Chigoubiche River (segment of 16.4 kilometres (10.2 mi)

- 8.4 kilometres (5.2 mi) southeasterly along mountain cliffs, then along a segment of the Canadian National Railway to the confluence of the Grand Portage River (coming from the Southwest);
- 0.8 kilometres (0.50 mi) south-east, to the confluence of the Pilet River (coming from the South);
- 1.1 kilometres (0.68 mi) southeasterly to the western limit of the township of Ailleboust;
- 0.6 kilometres (0.37 mi) East in Ailleboust Township to the Canadian National Railway Bridge;
- 5.5 kilometres (3.4 mi) northeasterly by collecting the waters of Adon Creek (from the North) and forming two large curves to the North, to the road bridge of the hamlet "Poisson-Blanc";

Lower course of Chigoubiche River (segment of 38.2 kilometres (23.7 mi)

- 2.2 kilometres (1.4 mi) east by collecting Turenne Creek (coming from the North) and the Thibeault Lake Discharge (coming from the North), until the confluence of the rivière à la Pêche (coming from the South);
- 3.1 kilometres (1.9 mi) east, then south-east, to the bridge of the forest road;
- 30.0 kilometres (18.6 mi) north-east forming two large curves to the north, to the confluence of the Vermillon River (Chigoubiche River tributary) (coming from the South);
- 0.3 kilometres (0.19 mi) easterly to the western boundary of Chomedey Township;
- 2.6 kilometres (1.6 mi) eastward in the Township of Chomedey forming a northward curve to its mouth.

The confluence of the "Chigoubiche River" with the Normandin River is located at:

- 10.5 kilometres (6.5 mi) north of route 167 which runs along the Canadian National Railway;
- 66.7 kilometres (41.4 mi) northwest of the mouth of the Ashuapmushuan River (confluence with lac Saint-Jean);
- 105.6 kilometres (65.6 mi) northwest of the mouth of lac Saint-Jean (confluence with the Saguenay River).
The Chigoubiche River flows on the west bank of the Ashuapmushuan River, ie 17.1 kilometres (10.6 mi) downstream from the mouth of the rivière aux Brochets; and at upstream of the confluence of the Ashuapmushuan River (length: 193 kilometres (120 mi) which flows southeast and will discharge to Saint-Félicien on the west shore of Lac Saint-Jean.

== Toponymy ==
During the period between 1950 (about) and 1964, the Chigoubiche River was named "Argenson River". This toponymic designation was related to the name of the canton of Argenson where it originates in Lake Chigoubiche. The term "Argenson" evoked the memory of the fifth governor of New France (1658-1661).

The toponym "Chigoubiche River" was formalized on December 5, 1968, at the Commission de toponymie du Québec, when it was created.

== See also ==
- Saguenay River
- Lac Saint-Jean, a body of water
- Ashuapmushuan River, a watercourse
- Vermillon River (Chigoubiche River tributary), a watercourse
- Rivière à la Pêche, a watercourse
- Pilet River, a watercourse
- Grand Portage River, a watercourse
- Lac-Ashuapmushuan, Quebec, an unorganized territory
- Le Domaine-du-Roy Regional County Municipality (MRC)
- List of rivers of Quebec
