= La Grosse Décharge Est =

Location
- Country: Canada
- Province: Quebec
- Region: Capitale-Nationale
- Regional County Municipality: Charlevoix Regional County Municipality
- City: Baie-Saint-Paul

Physical characteristics
- Source: Very little lake
  - location: Baie-Saint-Paul
  - coordinates: 47.51867°N 70.69467°W
  - elevation: 673 m (2,208 ft)
- Mouth: Rivière des Mares (Gouffre River tributary)
  - location: Baie-Saint-Paul
  - coordinates: 47.51867°N 70.69467°W
  - elevation: 380 m (1,250 ft)
- Length: 6.5 km (4.0 mi)

Basin features
- Tributaries
  - left: (from the mouth) Four streams.
  - right: (from the mouth) A stream.

La Grosse Décharge Est is a tributary of the north shore of La Grosse Décharge Ouest, flowing entirely in the town of Baie-Saint-Paul, in the Charlevoix Regional County Municipality, in the administrative region of Capitale-Nationale, in the province of Quebec, in Canada.

This valley is mainly served by secondary forest roads which connect to the Chemin du Séminaire which runs along the south side of La Grosse Décharge Ouest. Forestry is the main economic activity in this valley; recreational tourism, second.

The surface of La Grosse Décharge Est is generally frozen from the beginning of December until the beginning of April; however, safe circulation on the ice is generally done from mid-December to the end of March. The water level of the river varies with the seasons and the precipitation; the spring flood generally occurs in April.

== Geography ==
The Big East Discharge originates at the mouth of a very small lake (length: a hundred meters; altitude: 673 metres (2,208 ft)). This lake is enclosed between the mountains whose summit reaches 767 metres (2,516 ft) at 2.1 kilometres (1.3 mi) to the northeast; another peak reaches 971 metres (3,186 ft) at 1.7 kilometres (1.1 mi) to the southwest. The mouth of this lake is located at:

- 9.1 kilometres (5.7 mi) East of the Baie-Saint-Paul boundary and the unorganized territory of Lac-Jacques-Cartier;
- 6.9 kilometres (4.3 mi) east of the course of the Sainte-Anne River;
- 14.7 kilometres (9.1 mi) west of the mouth of the rivière des Mares (confluence with the Rivière du Gouffre);
- 17.0 kilometres (10.6 mi) west of downtown Baie-Saint-Paul.

From its source, the course of La Grosse Décharge Est descends from the mountain on 6.5 kilometres (4.0 mi) with a drop of 249 metres (817 ft), according to the following segments:

- 3.5 kilometres (2.2 mi) south-east down the mountain in a deep valley crossing a small lake in the middle of the segment (length: 0.3 kilometres (0.19 mi); altitude: 586 metres (1,923 ft)), to a stream (from the north);
- 3.0 kilometres (1.9 mi) first by forming a hook towards the south, then towards the south-east in a deep valley, until its mouth.

La Grosse Décharge Est drains onto the north shore of La Grosse Décharge Ouest in Baie-Saint-Paul. This mouth is located at:

- 1.1 kilometres (0.68 mi) north-east of the forest road;
- 4.3 kilometres (2.7 mi) north-west of the village center of Saint-Placide-Nord
- 11.2 kilometres (7.0 mi) west of downtown Baie-Saint-Paul;
- 12.9 kilometres (8.0 mi) north-west of the confluence of the Gouffre river and the Saint Lawrence River.

From the mouth of La Grosse Décharge Est, the current descends successively on 0.9 kilometres (0.56 mi) the course of la Grosse Décharge Ouest; on 11.8 kilometres (7.3 mi) the course of the Mares river; then on 7.8 kilometres (4.8 mi) with a drop of 15 metres (49 ft) following the course of the Rivière du Gouffre which flows into Baie-Saint-Paul in the Saint-Laurent river.

== Toponymy ==
This toponymic designation appears on the map "Domaine forestier du Séminaire de Québec", 1955-01.

The toponym "La Grosse Décharge Est" was formalized on March 25, 1997 at the Place Names Bank of the Commission de toponymie du Québec.

== Appendices ==
=== Related articles ===
- Charlevoix Regional County Municipality
- Baie-Saint-Paul, a city
- La Grosse Décharge Ouest
- Rivière des Mares (Gouffre River tributary)
- Rivière du Gouffre
- St. Lawrence River
- List of rivers of Quebec
