= Renaud River =

Location
- Country: Canada
- Province: Quebec
- Region: Capitale-Nationale
- Regional County Municipality: Charlevoix Regional County Municipality
- City: Baie-Saint-Paul

Physical characteristics
- Source: Stream at the bottom of Cap de la Mare
  - location: Baie-Saint-Paul
  - coordinates: 47.47080°N 70.53291°W
  - elevation: 37 m (121 ft)
- Mouth: Rivière du Gouffre
  - location: Baie-Saint-Paul
  - coordinates: 47.44611°N 70.51028°W
  - elevation: 10 m (33 ft)
- Length: 4.3 km (2.7 mi)

Basin features
- Tributaries
  - left: (from the mouth) Two streams, stream of the Mare des Champs.
  - right: (from the mouth) Stream, Équerre stream, Michel stream.

The Renaud River is a tributary of the west bank of the lower part of the rivière du Gouffre, flowing entirely in the town of Baie-Saint-Paul, in the Charlevoix Regional County Municipality, in the administrative region of Capitale-Nationale, in the province from Quebec, to Canada.

This valley is mainly served by the route 138 (boulevard de Monseigneur-De Laval) which runs along the foot of Cap de la Mare. Besides the Baie-Saint-Paul residential area, agriculture is the main economic activity in this valley.

The surface of the river at Renaud is generally frozen from the beginning of December until the beginning of April; however, safe circulation on the ice is generally done from mid-December to the end of March. The water level of the river varies with the seasons and the precipitation; the spring flood generally occurs in April.

== Geography ==
The Renaud river takes its source at the foot of Cap de la Mare from a stream (coming from the west) which descends the cliff. This source of the river is located at:

- 1.1 kilometres (0.68 mi) south-west of the mouth of the rivière des Mares;
- 3.0 kilometres (1.9 mi) south of the mouth of the Rémy River;
- 3.2 kilometres (2.0 mi) north-west of the mouth of the river at Renaud (confluence with the Rivière du Gouffre);
- 3.9 kilometres (2.4 mi) north-west of Baie-Saint-Paul town center.

From its source, the course of the river at Renaud descends on 4.3 kilometres (2.7 mi) in a plain on the west bank of the Rivière du Gouffre, with a drop of 27 metres (89 ft) , according to the following segments:

- 2.3 kilometres (1.4 mi) south-east, up to Michel stream (coming from the south-west);
- 0.9 kilometres (0.56 mi) towards the northeast first by crossing route 138, forming a loop to the south, then collecting the watercourse from the Mare des Champs (coming from the north), to a stream (coming from the north);
- 0.6 kilometres (0.37 mi) towards the south-east by collecting a stream (coming from the north) and by forming small serpentines, entering in urban area, up to the stream of Équerre (coming from the south- Where is);
- 0.5 kilometres (0.31 mi) to the east in an urban area, branching south-east to collect a stream (coming from the south), to its mouth.

The Renaud river flows on the southwest bank of Le Gros Bras, in the municipality of Saint-Urbain. This mouth is located at:

- 0.7 kilometres (0.43 mi) northwest of downtown Baie-Saint-Paul
- 2.4 kilometres (1.5 mi) north-west of the confluence of the Rivière du Gouffre and the Saint Lawrence River;
- 3.1 kilometres (1.9 mi) south-east of the confluence of the rivière des Mares and rivière du Gouffre.

From the mouth of the river at Renaud, the current descends on 11.5 kilometres (7.1 mi) with a drop of 16 metres (52 ft) following the course of the Rivière du Gouffre which flows into Baie-Saint-Paul in the St. Lawrence River.

== Toponymy ==
The toponym "Rivière à Renaud" was formalized on August 29, 1972, at the Place Names Bank of the Commission de toponymie du Québec.

== Appendices ==
=== Related articles ===
- Charlevoix Regional County Municipality
- Baie-Saint-Paul, a city
- Rivière du Gouffre
- St. Lawrence River
- List of rivers of Quebec
