= Rivière des Îlets =

Location
- Country: Canada
- Province: Quebec
- Region: Capitale-Nationale
- Regional County Municipality: Charlevoix Regional County Municipality
- Unorganized territory: Lac-Pikauba

Physical characteristics
- Source: Lac de la Haute Ville
  - location: Lac-Pikauba
  - coordinates: 47.73553°N 70.68652°W
  - elevation: 949 m (3,114 ft)
- Mouth: Rivière du Gouffre
  - location: Lac-Pikauba
  - coordinates: 47.73553°N 70.68652°W
  - elevation: 390 m (1,280 ft)
- Length: 15.1 km (9.4 mi)

Basin features
- Tributaries
  - left: (from the mouth) Stream, outlet of Lac de la Grosse Femelle, two streams, outlet of a branch of streams, streams, outlet of Lac de la Baie, outlet of Lac de l'Alouette, stream (via Lac des Îlets), outlet of Lac Featured (via Lac des Îlets).
  - right: (from the mouth) Discharge of Croche and Portage lakes, discharge of a small lake, discharge of Lac des Mouches.

The Rivière des Îlets is a tributary of the southern bank of the upper part of the Rivière du Gouffre, flowing in the unorganized territory of Lac-Pikauba, in the Charlevoix Regional County Municipality, in the administrative region of Capitale-Nationale, in the province of Quebec, in Canada.

The lower part of this valley does not have roads suitable for cars because of the very mountainous terrain. The upper and middle parts of this valley are served by a few secondary forest roads which connect to the west with route 381. Forestry is the main economic activity in this valley; recreational tourism, second.

The surface of the lower Îlets river is generally frozen from the beginning of December until the beginning of April; however, safe circulation on the ice is generally done from mid-December to the end of March. The upper part of this river has a freezing period of about one more week. The water level of the river varies with the seasons and the precipitation; the spring flood generally occurs in April.

== Geography ==
The Îlets river rises from the Lac de la Haute Ville (length: 0.7 kilometres (0.43 mi); altitude: 949 metres (3,114 ft)) which is landlocked between mountains in a forest area. The mouth of the Upper Town lake is located on the eastern shore of the lake, either:

- 2.9 kilometres (1.8 mi) north-east of the center of the hamlet of La Galette;
- 2.9 kilometres (1.8 mi) east of the course of the Petite rivière Malbaie which runs along the route 381;
- 4.7 kilometres (2.9 mi) north-west of the summit (altitude: 955 metres (3,133 ft) of Mont Jean-Palardy;
- 8.5 kilometres (5.3 mi) south-west of the summit (altitude: 959 metres (3,146 ft) of Mont du Gros Castor;
- 10.5 kilometres (6.5 mi) west of the summit (altitude: 980 metres (3,220 ft) of Mont du Four;
- 11.5 kilometres (7.1 mi) south-west of the mouth of the Îlets river (confluence with the rivière du Gouffre);
- 35.4 kilometres (22.0 mi) north-west of Baie-Saint-Paul town center.

From the Upper Town Lake, the course of the Îlets river descends on 15.1 kilometres (9.4 mi) in a generally deep valley, with a drop of 559 metres (1,834 ft), according to following segments:

- 1.5 kilometres (0.93 mi) towards the east by crossing Lac de la Vase (which receives the outlet of Lac des Mouches on the south side), Lac Élysée (length: 0.39 kilometres (0.24 mi) ; altitude: 927 metres (3,041 ft)), to the bottom of a bay on the west shore of Lac des Îlets;
- 2.5 kilometres (1.6 mi) first towards the northeast crossing Lac des Îlets (length: 1.5 kilometres (0.93 mi); altitude: 925 metres (3,035 ft)), then two small lakes (Lac Willis and Lac Pouliot), up to a bend in the river. Note: Lac des Îlets is misshapen and has three sections, the main of which has two islands. Lac des Îlets receives the outlet (from the northwest) from Lac Comporté and a stream (from the north);
- 3.2 kilometres (2.0 mi) towards the north in an increasingly deep valley, collecting the discharge (coming from the west) of the Alouette lake and the discharge (coming from the east) of Lac Rouillé, to the outlet (coming from the southwest) of Lac de la Baie;
- 1.5 kilometres (0.93 mi) towards the north, bending towards the northeast to go around a mountain, until the discharge (coming from the northwest) of a branch of some streams;
- 3.4 kilometres (2.1 mi) towards the north-east in a well-enclosed valley and forming a bend towards the north, up to a stream (coming from the south, ie the outlet of Lac Croche);
- 3.0 kilometres (1.9 mi) north-east in a well-steep valley crossing rapids on almost all this segment except the last 0.5 metres (1 ft 8 in) and collecting a mountain stream (coming from the south), to its mouth.

The Îlets river flows on the south bank of the upper part of the Rivière du Gouffre, in the unorganized territory of Lac-Pikauba. This mouth is located at:

- 2.6 kilometres (1.6 mi) east of a mountain peak (altitude: 1,008 metres (3,307 ft));
- 4.3 kilometres (2.7 mi) north of the course of the Rivière du Gouffre Sud-Ouest;
- 36.2 kilometres (22.5 mi) north-west of downtown Baie-Saint-Paul;
- 31.8 kilometres (19.8 mi) west of La Malbaie town center.

From the mouth of the Îlets river, the current descends on 64.2 kilometres (39.9 mi) with a drop of 386 metres (1,266 ft) following the course of the rivière du Gouffre which flows in Baie-Saint-Paul in the St. Lawrence River.

== Toponymy ==
This toponymic designation appears on the answer key of regional map number 3-east, section 23 NW, 1943, on the draft of that of Saint-Urbain, 1958-12-18, item 164 and on the draft of the Lac des Martres, 1961-09-25, item a-93. Rivière des Îlots is a variant of the name.

The toponym "Rivière des Îlets" was formalized on December 5, 1968 at the Place Names Bank of the Commission de toponymie du Québec.

== Appendices ==
=== Related articles ===
- Charlevoix Regional County Municipality
- Lac-Pikauba, an unorganized territory
- Rivière du Gouffre
- St. Lawrence River
- List of rivers of Quebec
