= Grand lac des Enfers =

Lake in Canada

- Location in Quebec
- Location: Lac-Pikauba, Charlevoix Regional County Municipality (MRC), Capitale-Nationale, Quebec, Canada
- Coordinates: 47.71722°N 71.00889°W
- Lake type: Natural
- Primary inflows: (Clockwise from the mouth): Lac Tobin outlet from Lac du Styx, as well as two streams; (one from the northwest and; one from the north).
- Primary outflows: Rivière de l'Enfer
- Basin countries: Canada
- Max. length: 2.6 km (1.6 mi)
- Max. width: 10.7 km (6.6 mi)
- Surface elevation: 950 m (3,120 ft)
- Islands: 4

The Grand lac des Enfers ('Great lake of the Hells') is a freshwater body located in the unorganized territory of Lac-Pikauba, in the Charlevoix Regional County Municipality, in the administrative region of Capitale-Nationale, in the province of Quebec, in Canada.

The Great Lake of Hell is the main head lake of the rivière de l'Enfer. This mountain lake is entirely located in an area where forestry has always been the predominant economic activity. In XIXth, recreotourism activities took off. Due to the altitude, this lake is normally frozen from late October to early May; however, the safe period for traffic on the ice is usually from late November to April.

A forest road serves the hydrographic slope of Grand lac des Enfers.

== Geography ==
The Hell River rises from the Great Lake of Hell (length: 2.6 kilometres (1.6 mi) in the shape of a misshapen banana with four large peninsulas; altitude: 950 metres (3,120 ft)) . This lake is located in a forest area in Lac-Pikauba and it is landlocked between the mountains, particularly the cliffs of the North shore.

The main hydrographic slopes near Grand Lac des Enfers are:

- north: rivière à Mars,
- to the east: rivière de l'Enfer, Malbaie River,
- in the south: lac Hébert, la Bilodeau, Fronsac Lake,
- West:

The mouth of Grand lac des Enfers is located at the bottom of a bay east of the lake. From there, the current descends the "rivière de l'Enfer" generally east on 16.2 kilometres (10.1 mi), then follows the course of the Malbaie river on 130.9 kilometres (81.3 mi) with a drop of 716 metres (2,349 ft) which drains to La Malbaie in the St. Lawrence River.

== Toponymy ==
This toponymic designation appeared on regional map number 3-Est, (1943) (Large, added), sector 23 NW and on the draft of the map of Saint-Urbain, 1958-12-17, item 39 (small part). Lac de l'Enfer is a variant of the official name.

The toponym "Grand lac des Enfers" was formalized on December 5, 1968, at the Place Names Bank of the Commission de toponymie du Québec.

== See also ==
- Lac-Pikauba, an unorganized territory
- Charlevoix Regional County Municipality
- Laurentides Wildlife Reserve
- Malbaie River
