= Lac à Jack =

Lake in Quebec, Canada

- Location in Quebec
- Location: Lac-Pikauba, Charlevoix Regional County Municipality (MRC), Capitale-Nationale, Quebec, Canada
- Coordinates: 47.62056°N 71.00611°W
- Lake type: Natural
- Primary inflows: (Clockwise from the mouth): Discharge from Fronsac Lake, discharge from Petit lac à Jack, discharge from Lac des Blaireaux..
- Primary outflows: Outlet going to Fronsac Lake
- Basin countries: Canada
- Max. length: 3.3 km (2.1 mi)
- Max. width: 1.7 km (1.1 mi)
- Surface elevation: 821 m (2,694 ft)

Lac à Jack (English: Jack's Lake) is a freshwater body located in the unorganized territory of Lac-Pikauba, in the Charlevoix Regional County Municipality, in the administrative region of Capitale-Nationale, in the province of Quebec, in Canada. This body of water is located in the Laurentides Wildlife Reserve.

Lake à Jack is one of the head water bodies of the Malbaie River. This mountain lake is entirely located in an area where forestry has always been the predominant economic activity. In the middle of XIXth, recreational tourism activities took off. Due to the altitude, this lake is normally frozen from the end of October to the end of April; however, the safe ice circulation period is usually from early December to April.

Secondary forest roads serve the southern part of the hydrographic slope of Lac à Jack. The northeast part does not have a passable road.

== Geography ==
Located in a forest area in the unorganized territory of Lac-Pikauba in the Laurentides Wildlife Reserve, Lac à Jack (length: 3.3 kilometres (2.1 mi); altitude: 821 metres (2,694 ft)) is located on the western slope of the Malbaie River valley. It covers an area of 2.3 km² in a partially marshy basin. Jack's lake has been modified by facilities designed to facilitate the log drive that is practiced each spring, notably the construction of the dam. Lac à Jack is mainly supplied to the west by the outlet of Fronsac Lake via a strait 0.3 kilometres (0.19 mi) and by the outlet (coming from the north) of Petit lac à Jack via a strait of 0.8 kilometres (0.50 mi). The dam at the mouth of Lac à Jack is located on the east side of the lake. This mouth is located at:

- 3.1 kilometres (1.9 mi) east of the mouth of Fronsac Lake;
- 1.1 kilometres (0.68 mi) north-west of the mouth of the Lac à Jack outlet (confluence with the Malbaie River);
- 3.2 kilometres (2.0 mi) north-west of the mouth of Malbaie Lake;
- 40.6 kilometres (25.2 mi) west of downtown Baie-Saint-Paul;
- 62.3 kilometres (38.7 mi) south-west of La Malbaie town center.

From the mouth of Jack's lake, the current descends on 2.1 kilometres (1.3 mi) towards the south of the outlet of Jack's lake; from there, the current follows the course of the Malbaie river on 148.9 kilometres (92.5 mi) with a drop of 818 metres (2,684 ft) which flows to La Malbaie in the Saint Lawrence River.

== Main attractions ==
One of the largest in the Laurentian wildlife reserve, Lac à Jack is popular for speckled trout fishing (30,000 catches per year). In addition, a canoe-camping circuit on the Malbaie River begins at the foot of the dam to cross the entire park; the descent allows you to admire the wild landscape of the park.

== Toponymy ==
This toponymic designation appears on regional map number 3, 1943.

The name "Grand lac à Jack" appeared on maps at the beginning of the 20th century. The origin of the toponym remains uncertain. However, the presence of an Amerindian named Jacques Bacon, who spent the summer camping in these areas with his family, several decades ago, could be linked to the origin of this body of water. The construction of the Lac-à-Jack dam allowed the passage of a road that links the Jacques-Cartier lake sector to the Grands-Jardins conservation park. This name was approved on April 3, 1959, by the Commission de géographie du Québec. Grand lac Jack and Grand lac à Jack are variants of the official name.

The toponym "Lac à Jack" was formalized on December 5, 1968, at the Place Names Bank of the Commission de toponymie du Québec.

== See also ==
- Charlevoix Regional County Municipality
- Lac-Pikauba, an unorganized territory
- Laurentides Wildlife Reserve
- Fronsac Lake
- Malbaie River
