= Rivière à la Loutre (Gouffre River tributary) =

Location
- Country: Canada
- Province: Quebec
- Region: Capitale-Nationale
- Regional County Municipality: Charlevoix Regional County Municipality and Charlevoix-Est
- Unorganized territory and municipality: Saint-Hilarion and Notre-Dame-des-Monts

Physical characteristics
- Source: Small lake in agricultural area
  - location: Saint-Hilarion
  - coordinates: 47.59322°N 70.42962°W
  - elevation: 376 m (1,234 ft)
- Mouth: Rivière du Gouffre
  - location: Notre-Dame-des-Monts
  - coordinates: 47.64944°N 70.45194°W
  - elevation: 210 m (690 ft)
- Length: 8.5 km (5.3 mi)

Basin features
- Tributaries
  - left: (from the mouth) Stream (via Lac à Marcel-Audet), stream.
  - right: (from the mouth) Lake discharge at Lucien-Simard, discharge from a small lake, discharge from a small lake.

The Rivière à la Loutre is a tributary of the eastern bank of the intermediate part of the Rivière du Gouffre, flowing in the administrative region of Capitale-Nationale, in the province from Quebec, to Canada. The course of this river flows through the regional county municipalities (MRCs) of:

- Charlevoix-Est: in the municipality of de Notre-Dame-des-Monts;
- Charlevoix Regional County Municipality: in the municipality of Saint-Hilarion.

The lower part of this valley is served by the range road from Chicago West. The intermediate part is served by Chemin Cartier and Chemin du rang Saint-Antoine. The upper part is served by the 5th range road and the 6th range road. Agriculture and forestry are the main economic activities in this valley.

The surface of the rivière à la Loutre is generally frozen from the beginning of December until the beginning of April; however, safe circulation on the ice is generally done from mid-December to the end of March. The water level of the river varies with the seasons and the precipitation; the spring flood generally occurs in April.

== Geography ==
The Loutre river takes its source from a small lake (length: 0.1 kilometres (0.062 mi); altitude: 376 metres (1,234 ft)) located in agricultural area on the south side of the 5th range road. The mouth of this small lake is located at the bottom of the west bay of the lake, either:

- 2.7 kilometres (1.7 mi) west of route 138;
- 3.1 kilometres (1.9 mi) north-west of the village center of Saint-Hilarion, Quebec (with the Gouffre river);
- 17.3 kilometres (10.7 mi) south-west of the north-west bank of the Saint-Laurent river (at the height of Saint-Irénée);
- 17.7 kilometres (11.0 mi) north of downtown Baie-Saint-Paul.

From Lac des Brûlés, the course of the rivière à la Loutre descends on 8.5 kilometres (5.3 mi) in a generally deep valley, with a drop of 166 metres (545 ft), according to the following segments:

- 0.6 kilometres (0.37 mi) towards the north in agricultural area by cutting the 5th range path and crossing on 0.26 kilometres (0.16 mi) a dam lake (altitude: 369 metres (1,211 ft)), to its mouth;
- 2.0 kilometres (1.2 mi) towards the northwest in the agricultural zone by forming a curve towards the southwest and bifurcating towards the northeast by crossing on 0.8 kilometres (0.50 mi) the lake at Marcel-Audet (altitude: 359 metres (1,178 ft)) over its full length, up to the path of 6th range. Note: This lake has a marsh area on the west side and an autare on the south side;
- 1.1 kilometres (0.68 mi) to the north, first by crossing the 6th range path, crossing a lake (length: 0.3 kilometres (0.19 mi); altitude: 359 metres (1,178 ft)) of dam which turns out to be the northward extension of the Lake at Marcel-Audet, then a second small dam lake, up to Cartier road;
- 1.7 kilometres (1.1 mi) towards the north first by crossing a small lake, bending towards the west by collecting a stream (coming from the northeast), up to the chemin du rang Saint-Antoine;
- 2.4 kilometres (1.5 mi) north-west, up to the range road from Chicago West;
- 0.7 kilometres (0.43 mi) towards the north, collecting at the end of the segment the discharge (coming from the south) from the Lake to Lucien Simard, up to its mouth.

The Loutre river flows in a loop of river on the east bank of the Gouffre river, in the municipality of Notre-Dame-des-Monts. This mouth is located at:

- 1.6 kilometres (0.99 mi) downstream of the mouth of the Rivière du Gouffre Sud-Ouest;
- 5.6 kilometres (3.5 mi) south-west of the village center of Notre-Dame-des-Monts;
- 9.3 kilometres (5.8 mi) north-west of the village center of Saint-Hilarion;
- 23.5 kilometres (14.6 mi) north-west of Baie-Saint-Paul town center;
- 22.7 kilometres (14.1 mi) southwest of downtown La Malbaie.

From the mouth of the Loutre river, the current descends on 40.1 kilometres (24.9 mi) with a drop of 206 metres (676 ft) following the course of the rivière du Gouffre which spill at Baie-Saint-Paul in the St. Lawrence River.

== Toponymy ==
The toponym “rivière à la Loutre” was formalized on February 25, 1976, at the Place Names Bank of the Commission de toponymie du Québec.

== See also ==
- List of rivers of Quebec
