= La Grosse Décharge Ouest =

Location
- Country: Canada
- Province: Quebec
- Region: Capitale-Nationale
- Regional County Municipality: Charlevoix Regional County Municipality
- City: Baie-Saint-Paul

Physical characteristics
- Source: Côté Lake
  - location: Baie-Saint-Paul
  - coordinates: 47.510907°N 70.70631°W
  - elevation: 629 m (2,064 ft)
- Mouth: Rivière des Mares (Gouffre River tributary)
  - location: Baie-Saint-Paul
  - coordinates: 47.48283°N 70.64163°W
  - elevation: 350 m (1,150 ft)
- Length: 7.7 km (4.8 mi)

Basin features
- Tributaries
  - left: (from the mouth) Brook, La Grosse Décharge Est
  - right: (from the mouth) Six streams.

La Grosse Décharge Ouest is a tributary of the west bank of the upper part of the rivière des Mares, flowing entirely in the town of Baie-Saint-Paul, in the Charlevoix Regional County Municipality, in the administrative region of Capitale-Nationale, in the province from Quebec, to Canada.

This valley is mainly served by the Seminary path which runs along the south side of this watercourse. Forestry is the main economic activity in this valley; recreational tourism, second.

The surface of La Grosse Décharge Ouest is generally frozen from the beginning of December until the beginning of April; however, safe circulation on the ice is generally done from mid-December to the end of March. The water level of the river varies with the seasons and the precipitation; the spring flood generally occurs in April.

== Geography ==
The Grosse Décharge Ouest rises at the mouth of Côté lake (length: 0.17 kilometres (0.11 mi); altitude: 620 metres (2,030 ft)). This lake is enclosed between the mountains whose summit reaches 761 metres (2,497 ft) at 2.1 kilometres (1.3 mi) to the northeast; another peak reaches 972 metres (3,189 ft) at 1.74 kilometres (1.08 mi) to the southwest. The mouth of this lake is located at:

- 4.6 kilometres (2.9 mi) north of Lac Croche;
- 8.5 kilometres (5.3 mi) north-east of the course of the Sainte-Anne River;
- 14.7 kilometres (9.1 mi) west of the mouth of the rivière des Mares (confluence with the rivière du Gouffre);
- 17.0 kilometres (10.6 mi) west of downtown Baie-Saint-Paul.

From its source, the course of La Grosse Décharge Ouest descends from the mountain on 7.7 kilometres (4.8 mi) with a drop of 279 metres (915 ft), according to the following segments:

- 1.0 kilometre (0.62 mi) towards the south-east down the mountain in a deep valley, to a stream (coming from the south-west);
- 1.1 kilometres (0.68 mi) to the east in a deep valley up to a bend in the river;
- 4.7 kilometres (2.9 mi) to the east in a deep valley, collecting two streams (each coming from the southwest), to La Grosse Décharge Est (coming from the northwest);
- 0.9 kilometres (0.56 mi) north-east in a deep valley, to its mouth.

The Grosse Décharge Ouest pours into a bend on the west bank of the Mares river in Baie-Saint-Paul. This mouth is located at:

- 2.0 kilometres (1.2 mi) north-east of the forest road;
- 4.0 kilometres (2.5 mi) north-west of the village center of Saint-Placide-Nord
- 10.8 kilometres (6.7 mi) west of downtown Baie-Saint-Paul;
- 12.5 kilometres (7.8 mi) north-west of the confluence of the Gouffre river and the Saint-Laurent river.

From the mouth of La Grosse Décharge Ouest, the current descends on 11.8 kilometres (7.3 mi) the course of the Mares river; then on 7.8 kilometres (4.8 mi) with a drop of 15 metres (49 ft) following the course of the Rivière du Gouffre which flows into Baie-Saint-Paul in the Saint-Laurent river.

== Toponymy ==
This toponymic designation appears on the map "Domaine forestier du Séminaire de Québec", 1955-01.

The toponym "La Grosse Décharge Ouest" was formalized on March 25, 1997 at the Place Names Bank of the Commission de toponymie du Québec.

== Appendices ==
=== Related articles ===
- Charlevoix Regional County Municipality
- Baie-Saint-Paul, a city
- La Grosse Décharge Est
- Rivière des Mares (Gouffre River tributary)
- Rivière du Gouffre
- St. Lawrence River
- List of rivers of Quebec
