= Rivière de l'Enfer =

- Location within Quebec

Location
- Country: Canada
- Province: Quebec
- Region: Capitale-Nationale
- Regional County Municipality: Mékinac
- Municipalities: Lac-Pikauba

Physical characteristics
- Source: Grand lac des Enfers
  - location: Lac-Pikauba
  - coordinates: 47°42′48″N 70°59′41″W
  - elevation: 950 m (3,120 ft)
- Mouth: Malbaie River
  - location: Lac-Pikauba
  - coordinates: 47°40′31″N 70°50′44″W
  - elevation: 720 m (2,360 ft)
- Length: 16.2 km (10.1 mi)

Basin features
- Tributaries
  - left: (Upward from the mouth): Lac Drolet and Lac du Patrouilleur outlet; Fagne and Odette lakes outlet; Étang Tranquille outlet; Lac des Enfers outlet; Lac à la Bouillie outlet; two unidentified streams; two streams (via Grand lac des Hell).
  - right: (Upward from the mouth): Lac Menhir outlet; stream; Lac du Camp outlet.

The Rivière de l'Enfer ('Hell's River') is a tributary of the eastern bank of the Malbaie River, flowing in the unorganized territory of Lac-Pikauba, in the regional county municipality (MRC) of Charlevoix Regional County Municipality, in the administrative region of Capitale-Nationale, in the province of Quebec, in Canada. This watercourse crosses the Laurentides Wildlife Reserve and Grands-Jardins National Park.

This valley is served by a secondary forest road going up by the north bank. The upper part is served by some secondary forest roads linked to road R0304. Forestry is the main economic activity in this valley; recreational tourism, second.

Because of the altitude, the surface of the Hell River is generally frozen from the end of November until the beginning of March; however, safe circulation on the ice is generally done from the beginning of December to the beginning of April. The water level of the river varies with the seasons and the precipitation; the spring flood generally occurs in April.

== Geography ==
The "rivière de l'Enfer" rises from Grand lac des Enfers (length: 2.6 kilometres (1.6 mi) in the shape of a misshapen banana with four large peninsulas; altitude: 950 metres (3,120 ft)), located in a forest area in Lac-Pikauba. This lake is landlocked between the mountains, particularly the cliffs of the North shore. This lake is mainly fed by the outlet of Lac Tobin du Lac du Styx, as well as two streams (one coming from the northwest and the other coming from the north). The mouth of this small lake is located to the southwest, at:

- 0.3 kilometres (0.19 mi) west of the forest road R0360;
- 11.9 kilometres (7.4 mi) west of the mouth of the Hell River;
- 15.9 kilometres (9.9 mi) north-east of route 175;
- 48.5 kilometres (30.1 mi) north-west of Baie-Saint-Paul town center;
- 63.7 kilometres (39.6 mi) west of course the mouth of the Malbaie River.

From the mouth of Grand lac des Enfers, the course of the Hell river descends on 16.2 kilometres (10.1 mi), with a drop of 230 metres (750 ft), depending on the segments following:

- 2.6 kilometres (1.6 mi) towards the north-east in a deep valley forming a curve towards the south-east and a loop towards the south at the end of the segment, up to a stream (coming from the north);
- 1.7 kilometres (1.1 mi) eastward curving northeast, to a stream (coming from the northwest);
- 1.0 kilometre (0.62 mi) south-east, to the outlet (coming from the south) of Lac du Camp;
- 1.9 kilometres (1.2 mi) towards the northeast, bending slightly to the east to go around a mountain, to the outlet (coming from the northwest (Lac à la Bouillie));
- 5.6 kilometres (3.5 mi) towards the south-east, collecting the outlet (coming from the north) from Lac des Enfers, the outlet (coming from the north) from the Étang Tranquille, as well as collecting two streams (coming from the south), and bending towards the northeast at the end of the segment up to the outlet (coming from the north) from lakes Muscat and Odette;
- 2.8 kilometres (1.7 mi) to the east crossing several series of rapids, forming a small hook to the north, and crossing Bob Lake (altitude: 723 metres (2,372 ft)) on 0.54 kilometres (0.34 mi), to its mouth;
- 0.6 kilometres (0.37 mi) towards the south-east by crossing many rapids, until its mouth.

The Hell River flows into a bend on the west bank of the Malbaie River, in the unorganized territory of Lac-Pikauba, in Grands-Jardins National Park. This mouth is located at:

- 52.0 kilometres (32.3 mi) south-west of the road bridge at the mouth of the Malbaie river, ie in downtown La Malbaie;
- 36.5 kilometres (22.7 mi) northwest of downtown Baie-Saint-Paul;
- 16.2 kilometres (10.1 mi) north-east of the mouth of lac Malbaie which turns out to be the head lake of the Malbaie river.

From the mouth of the Hell river, the current descends on 130.9 kilometres (81.3 mi) with a drop of 716 metres (2,349 ft) following the course of the Malbaie river which dump at La Malbaie in the St. Lawrence River.

== Toponymy ==
In French Canadian toponymy, already in the 19th century, the term Hell was used to designate these entities as well as a mountain pierced by a deep crevasse, located southeast of Grand lac des Enfers. The stream has the same name as its head lake; these toponyms appear in the 1914 Dictionary of Rivers and Lakes of the Province of Quebec.

The toponymic designation "Rivière de l'Enfer" was first approved on April 3, 1959, by the Commission de géographie du Québec.

The toponym "Rivière de l'Enfer" was formalized on December 5, 1968, at the Place Names Bank of the Commission de toponymie du Québec.

== Appendices ==
=== Related articles ===
- Charlevoix Regional County Municipality
- Lac-Pikauba, an unorganized territory
- Laurentides Wildlife Reserve
- Grands-Jardins National Park
- Grand lac des Enfers
- Malbaie River
- St. Lawrence River
- List of rivers of Quebec
