= Rivière de Chicago =

Location
- Country: Canada
- Province: Quebec
- Region: Capitale-Nationale
- Regional County Municipality: Charlevoix Regional County Municipality and Charlevoix-Est
- Unorganized territory and municipality: La Malbaie, Saint-Hilarion and Notre-Dame-des-Monts

Physical characteristics
- Source: Prime Lake
  - location: La Malbaie
  - coordinates: 47.61544°N 70.37636°W
  - elevation: 339 m (1,112 ft)
- Mouth: Rivière du Gouffre
  - location: Notre-Dame-des-Monts
  - coordinates: 47.65528°N 70.44°W
  - elevation: 208 m (682 ft)
- Length: 9.6 km (6.0 mi)

Basin features
- Tributaries
  - left: (from the mouth) Two streams, discharge from a small lake, three streams.
  - right: (from the mouth) Hot stream, stream, discharge from a small lake, stream, discharge from a small lake, discharge from a small lake, stream.

The Chicago River is a tributary of the east bank of the middle part of the Rivière du Gouffre, flowing in the administrative region of Capitale-Nationale, in the province from Quebec, to Canada. The course of this river flows through the regional county municipalities (MRCs) of:

- Charlevoix-Est: in the town of La Malbaie and the municipality of de Notre-Dame-des-Monts;
- Charlevoix Regional County Municipality: in the municipality of Saint-Hilarion.

The lower part of this valley is served by a forest road for the needs of forestry. The intermediate part is served by chemin du rang Sainte-Philomène and chemin du rang de Chicago Est. The upper part is served by route 138. Agriculture and forestry are the main economic activities in this valley.

The surface of the Chicago River is generally frozen from the beginning of December until the beginning of April; however, safe circulation on the ice is generally done from mid-December to the end of March. The water level of the river varies with the seasons and the precipitation; the spring flood generally occurs in April.

== Geography ==
The Chicago River originates from Lac des Brûlés (length: 1.5 kilometres (0.93 mi); altitude: 339 metres (1,112 ft)), surrounded by an agricultural and forestry area and located to the south- west of the hamlet La Gadelle, and at the western limit of the territory of the town of La Malbaie. This lake is located southwest of the Montagne de Saint-Jean-Baptiste and the Montagne de la Fée. The mouth of Lac des Brûlés is located at the bottom of the western bay of the lake, either:

- 1.6 kilometres (0.99 mi) north-west of a curve on route 138;
- 2.7 kilometres (1.7 mi) west of the center of the hamlet La Gadelle;
- 4.9 kilometres (3.0 mi) north of the village center of Saint-Hilarion;
- 6.5 kilometres (4.0 mi) south-east of the mouth of the Chicago river (confluence with the rivière du Gouffre);
- 13.9 kilometres (8.6 mi) west of the northwest shore of the Saint Lawrence River (at the height of Saint-Irénée);
- 17.5 kilometres (10.9 mi) south-west of La Malbaie town center.

From Lac des Brûlés, the course of the Chicago river descends on 9.6 kilometres (6.0 mi) in a generally deep valley, with a drop of 131 metres (430 ft), according to the following segments:

- 2.9 kilometres (1.8 mi) to the west by collecting a stream (coming from the north), crossing the limit of Saint-Hilarion, then branching north to pass on the west side of a marsh area by forming several small streamers, up to a stream (coming from the north);
- 6.7 kilometres (4.2 mi) first towards the southwest, then branching towards the northwest crossing the limit of Notre-Dame-des-Monts and collecting the Chaud stream (coming from the northeast ) at the end of the segment, until its mouth.

The Chicago river flows in a river loop on the east bank of the Gouffre river, in the municipality of Notre-Dame-des-Monts. This mouth is located at:

- 0.3 kilometres (0.19 mi) upstream from the mouth of the Rivière du Gouffre Sud-Ouest;
- 4.6 kilometres (2.9 mi) south-west of the village center of Notre-Dame-des-Monts;
- 24.4 kilometres (15.2 mi) north of downtown Baie-Saint-Paul;
- 21.8 kilometres (13.5 mi) south-west of downtown La Malbaie.

From the mouth of the Chicago River, the current descends on 42.0 kilometres (26.1 mi) with a drop of 204 metres (669 ft) following the course of the Gouffre River which flows in Baie-Saint-Paul in the St. Lawrence River.

== Toponymy ==
This toponymic designation is linked to the name of the range of Chicago that crosses the course of the river. This designation is based on the fact that the first dealers of this rank were French Canadians who emigrated to the Chicago region in the United States during the second half of the 19th century, to work there, but would have experienced certain setbacks. They would then have returned to settle north of Saint-Hilarion. The emigration of Quebecers to the neighboring country occurred after the canonical erection of the parish of Saint-Hilarion-de-Settrington in 1860. Variants: Le Gros Ruisseau; Lac des Brûlés discharge.

The toponym "Chicago River" was formalized on February 25, 1976 at the Place Names Bank of the Commission de toponymie du Québec.

== Appendices ==
=== Related articles ===
- Charlevoix Regional County Municipality
- Charlevoix-Est, a regional county municipality
- La Malbaie, a city
- Saint-Hilarion, a municipality
- Notre-Dame-des-Monts, a municipality
- Rivière du Gouffre
- St. Lawrence River
- List of rivers of Quebec
