= Savane Lake (Lac-Pikauba) =

Lake in Capitale-Nationale, Quebec, Canada

- Location within Quebec
- Location: Lac-Pikauba and Baie-Saint-Paul, La Côte-de-Beaupré Regional County Municipality and Charlevoix Regional County Municipality, Capitale-Nationale, Quebec, Canada
- Coordinates: 47°26′40″N 70°52′30″W
- Primary inflows: Lake Mestashibo outlet and Portage stream.
- Primary outflows: Rivière Savane du Nord
- Basin countries: Canada
- Max. length: 3.8 km (2.4 mi)
- Max. width: 0.9 km (0.56 mi)
- Surface elevation: 812 m (2,664 ft)

The lac Savane (English: Savannah lake) is a body of fresh water located northeast of the city of Quebec, in the administrative region of Capitale-Nationale, in the province of Quebec, in Canada. This body of water straddles the regional county municipalities of:

- La Côte-de-Beaupré Regional County Municipality: in the unorganized territory of Lac-Jacques-Cartier (southwest part of the lake);
- Charlevoix Regional County Municipality: in the unorganized territory of Lac-Pikauba (northeast part of the lake).

Savane Lake is served by a few secondary forest roads for forestry purposes. Forestry is the main economic activity in this valley; recreational tourism, second.

Because of the altitude, the surface of Savane Lake is generally frozen from the end of November to the beginning of April; however, safe circulation on the ice is generally done from the beginning of December until the beginning of April.

== Geography ==
The eastern shore of the lake turns out to be the southeastern limit of the Laurentides Wildlife Reserve. This deep lake between the mountains is located at:

- 2.1 kilometres (1.3 mi) northeast of a mountain peak located on the west side of Lac Savane;
- 2.4 kilometres (1.5 mi) northwest of a mountain peak located on the east side of Lac Savane;
- 4.8 kilometres (3.0 mi) southwest of the course of the Sainte-Anne river;
- 27.1 kilometres (16.8 mi) southwest of downtown Baie-Saint-Paul.

This lake has a length of 3.8 kilometres (2.4 mi), a width of 0.9 kilometres (0.56 mi) and an altitude of 812 metres (2,664 ft). The outlet of the lake is located on the northeast side and empties into the rivière Savane du Nord. Lake Savane is mainly fed by:

- Portage stream (coming from the south) which drains a group of six lakes upstream;
- the outlet (coming from the east) of Lake Mestashibo;
- two streams (coming from the west);
- a stream (coming from the east).

Savane Lake is an artificial body of water formed by the construction in 1923 of a dam at its mouth. This infrastructure was used to control the water supply to the reservoir of the Sept-Chutes power station on the Sainte-Anne river. This power station was decommissioned in 1983 and since the wooden infrastructure of the dam is no longer used.

From its mouth, the current goes down following the course of the Rivière Savane du Nord, then flows on first towards the south-east, then the south-west, following the course of the Sainte-Anne river, which crosses downtown Beaupré, to the northwest shore of the St. Lawrence River.

== Toponymy ==
In the past, this body of water was designated "Grand lac Savane".

The toponym "lac Savane" was formalized on December 5, 1968, at the Place Names Bank of the Commission de toponymie du Québec.
