= Rivière Savane du Nord =

River in Charlevoix Regional County Municipality, Quebec, Canada

- Location within Quebec

Location
- Country: Canada
- Province: Quebec
- Region: Capitale-Nationale
- Regional County Municipality: Charlevoix Regional County Municipality
- Municipality: Lac-Pikauba and Baie-Saint-Paul

Physical characteristics
- Source: Savane Lake
  - location: Lac-Pikauba
  - coordinates: 47°27′23″N 70°51′54″W
  - elevation: 812 m
- Mouth: Sainte-Anne River (Beaupré)
  - location: Baie-Saint-Paul
  - coordinates: 47°29′31″N 70°49′25″W
  - elevation: 570 m
- Length: 56 km (35 mi)

Basin features
- Tributaries
  - left: Unidentified stream
  - right: Unidentified stream

The Savane du Nord river is a tributary of the Sainte-Anne River, flowing on the north bank of the Saint Lawrence River. This river successively crosses the unorganized territory of Lac-Pikauba and the city of Baie-Saint-Paul, in the Charlevoix, in the administrative region of Capitale-Nationale, in the province of Quebec, in Canada. The upper part begins in the southeast of the territory of the Laurentides Wildlife Reserve; then its course leaves this reserve to follow on the south side the limit of the reserve.

The upper part (area of Savane Lake) of this small valley is served by a secondary forest road. The lower part is served by a forest road that goes up the west side of the Sainte-Anne river. Forestry is the main economic activity in this valley; recreational tourism, second.

Because of the altitude, the surface of the lower part of the Savane du Nord river is generally frozen from the end of November until the beginning of April; however, safe circulation on the ice is generally done from mid-December to the end of March. The upper part has a freezing period of about an additional week. The water level of the river varies with the seasons and the precipitation; the spring flood occurs in March or April.

== Geography ==
The Savane du Nord river takes its source at the dam of the mouth of Savane lake, in the unorganized territory of Lac-Pikauba, in the Laurentides Wildlife Reserve. This spring between the mountains is located at:

- 2.1 kilometres (1.3 mi) northeast of a mountain peak located on the west side of Savane Lake;
- 2.4 kilometres (1.5 mi) northwest of a mountain peak located on the east side of Lac Savane;
- 4.8 kilometres (3.0 mi) southwest of the course of the Sainte-Anne river;
- 27.1 kilometres (16.8 mi) south-west of downtown Baie-Saint-Paul.

From the dam at the mouth of Savane Lake, the course of this river descends from the mountains over 5.6 kilometres (3.5 mi), with a drop of 242 metres (794 ft). The course of the river is almost in a straight line going north, collecting a stream on the east side and another on the west side.

The Savane du Nord river flows near a bend on the south bank of the Sainte-Anne river. This confluence is located 25.3 kilometres (15.7 mi) west of Baie-Saint-Paul and 52.9 kilometres (32.9 mi) north of the center of Sainte-Anne-de-Beaupré.

From the confluence of the Savane du Nord river, the current flows over 53.9 kilometres (33.5 mi) first towards the south-east, then the south-west, following the course of the Sainte-Anne River (Beaupré), which crosses downtown Beaupré, to the northwest shore of Saint Lawrence River.

== Toponymy ==
This toponym appears on the draft of the Maillard map, 1959-05-21, item 121. The water table is found on the Seminary Lands of Quebec. Rivière Savane is a variant of the official name.

The toponym "rivière Savane du Nord" was formalized on December 5, 1968 at the Place Names Bank of the Commission de toponymie du Québec.

== See also ==
- Laurentides Wildlife Reserve
- Capitale-Nationale, an administrative region
- Charlevoix Regional County Municipality
- Lac-Pikauba, an unorganized territory
- Baie-Saint-Paul, a municipality
- Sainte-Anne River (Beaupré)
- Savane Lake (Lac-Pikauba)
- St. Lawrence River
- List of rivers of Quebec
