= Fronsac Lake =

Lake in Lac-Pikauba, Quebec, Canada

- Location in Quebec
- Location: Lac-Pikauba, Charlevoix Regional County Municipality (MRC), Capitale-Nationale, Quebec, Canada
- Coordinates: 47.62444°N 71.04111°W
- Lake type: Natural
- Primary inflows: (Clockwise from the mouth): Six unidentified streams, outlet of Lac Claude, stream at Jack.
- Primary outflows: Outlet going to Malbaie River
- Basin countries: Canada
- Max. length: 2.2 km (1.4 mi)
- Max. width: 1.75 km (1.09 mi)
- Surface elevation: 821 m (2,694 ft)

The Fronsac Lake (French: Lac Fronsac) is a freshwater body located in the unorganized territory of Lac-Pikauba, in the Charlevoix Regional County Municipality, in the administrative region of Capitale-Nationale, in the province of Quebec, in Canada. This body of water is located in the Laurentides Wildlife Reserve.

Lake Fronsac is a headwater body of the Malbaie River. The lake is entirely within an area where forestry has been the predominant economic activity. In the mid-19th century, recreational tourism began to flourish. Due to its altitude, the lake is typically frozen from late October to late April; however, the safe ice circulation period typically extends from early December to April.

Secondary forest roads provide access to the southern hydrographic side of Lake Fronsac, while a motorable road serves the northern portion. The northeastern section lacks road access.

== Geography ==
Located in a forest zone in the unorganized territory of Lac-Pikauba in the Laurentides Wildlife Reserve, the lake Fronsac (length: 2.2 kilometres (1.4 mi); altitude: 821 metres (2,694 ft)) is located on the western slope of the Malbaie River valley. The mouth of Fronsac Lake is located on the east side of the lake and is open onto lac à Jack. This mouth is located at:

- 3.1 kilometres (1.9 mi) west of the mouth of lac à Jack;
- 3.67 kilometres (2.28 mi) north-west of the mouth of the Lac à Jack outlet (confluence with the Malbaie river);
- 4.3 kilometres (2.7 mi) north-west of a bay in Malbaie Lake;
- 43.9 kilometres (27.3 mi) west of downtown Baie-Saint-Paul;
- 65.9 kilometres (40.9 mi) south-west of La Malbaie town center.

From the mouth of Lake Fronsac, the current crosses 3.1 kilometres (1.9 mi) to the east at Lac à Jack; then descend on 2.1 kilometres (1.3 mi) to the south the outlet of the lake at Jack; from there, the current follows the course of the Malbaie river on 148.9 kilometres (92.5 mi) with a drop in level of 818 metres (2,684 ft) which pours into La Malbaie in the St. Lawrence River.

== Toponymy ==
The term "Fronsac" turns out to be a commune in the southwest of France, located in the department of Gironde. The name appeared on the draft of the Jacques-Cartier Lake map, 1959-11-04, item 81. "Lac à Loutre" is a variant of the official name.

The toponym "Lac Fronsac" was formalized on December 5, 1968 at the Place Names Bank of the Commission de toponymie du Québec.

== Related articles ==
- Charlevoix Regional County Municipality
- Lac-Pikauba, an unorganized territory
- Laurentides Wildlife Reserve
- Zec des Martres
- Lac à Jack
- Malbaie River
