= Ruisseau de la Goudronnerie =

Location
- Country: Canada
- Province: Quebec
- Region: Capitale-Nationale
- Regional County Municipality: Charlevoix Regional County Municipality
- City: Baie-Saint-Paul

Physical characteristics
- Source: Small lake in mountain area
  - location: Baie-Saint-Paul
  - coordinates: 47.50067°N 70.46045°W
  - elevation: 376 m (1,234 ft)
- Mouth: Rivière du Gouffre
  - location: Baie-Saint-Paul
  - coordinates: 47.49332°N 70.51043°W
  - elevation: 210 m (690 ft)
- Length: 8.5 km (5.3 mi)

Basin features
- Tributaries
  - left: A mountain stream.

The ruisseau de la Goudronnerie (English: Tar Stream) is a tributary of the eastern bank of the lower part of the rivière du Gouffre, flowing in the territory of the town of Baie-Saint-Paul, in the Charlevoix Regional County Municipality, in the administrative region of Capitale-Nationale, in the province from Quebec, to Canada.

The upper part of this valley is served by Chemin Saint-Ours and Chemin Sainte-Catherine. The lower part is served by Chemin Saint-Laurent. Forestry is the main economic activity in this valley; recreational tourism, second.

The surface of the Goudronnerie stream is generally frozen from the beginning of December until the beginning of April; however, safe circulation on the ice is generally done from mid-December to the end of March. The water level of the river varies with the seasons and the precipitation; the spring flood generally occurs in April.

== Geography ==
The stream of Goudronnerie rises from a very small mountain lake (altitude: 376 metres (1,234 ft)) located in a forest area on the northwest slope of the Montagne des Orignaux (altitude: 476 metres (1,562 ft)) and of Mascou Mountain (altitude: 572 metres (1,877 ft)). The mouth of this small lake is located at:

- 3.8 kilometres (2.4 mi) east of route 138;
- 5.6 kilometres (3.5 mi) to the southeast of the village center of Belley;
- 3.8 kilometres (2.4 mi) north-east of the mouth of the Goudronnerie stream (confluence with the Gouffre river);
- 7.3 kilometres (4.5 mi) north-east of the north-west bank of the Saint Lawrence River;
- 7.4 kilometres (4.6 mi) north of downtown Baie-Saint-Paul.

From this source, the course of the Goudronnerie stream descends on 5.5 kilometres (3.4 mi), with a drop of 166 metres (545 ft), according to the following segments:

- 3.0 kilometres (1.9 mi) north-west down the mountain, then south-west, to a stream (coming from the south);
- 2.5 kilometres (1.6 mi) westward down the mountain, bending south to cross a hamlet on the plain of the eastern bank of the rivière du Gouffre, to its mouth.

The Goudronnerie stream flows in a river loop on the east bank of the rivière du Gouffre, in the municipality of Baie-Saint-Paul. This mouth is located at:

- 0.19 kilometres (0.12 mi) downstream of the mouth of the Remy River which flows on the opposite bank;
- 0.7 kilometres (0.43 mi) east of route 138;
- 7.4 kilometres (4.6 mi) south-east of the village center of Saint-Urbain;
- 5.8 kilometres (3.6 mi) north-west of Baie-Saint-Paul town center.

From the mouth of the Goudronnerie stream, the current descends on 22.4 kilometres (13.9 mi) with a drop of 16 metres (52 ft) following the course of the Rivière du Gouffre which flows into Baie-Saint-Paul in the St. Lawrence River.

== Toponymy ==
This toponymic designation dates from the end of the 17th century. This toponym evokes the exploitation of a royal tarry in the Saint-Paul bay, fitted out in 1670. Project realized by the intendant Jean Talon (1625-1694), this company was to produce tar from pine resin and thus favor shipbuilding in New France. Having had the tarryers expelled in 1676 by the intendant Duchesneau, Monsignor de Laval and the Séminaire de Québec later tried to exploit this business, but without much success.

In certain documents from the middle of the 18th century, this watercourse is designated "Ruisseau des Godronniers" and, on Joseph Bouchette's 1831 map, that of Rivière Ste-Croix. Two variants of the official name: Ruisseau des Godronniers is a variant found in certain documents from the mid-18th century; Rivière Sainte-Croix is a second historical variant found on Joseph Bouchette's 1831 map.

The toponym "Goudronnerie stream" was formalized on August 17, 1978 at the Place Names Bank of the Commission de toponymie du Québec.

== Appendices ==
=== Related articles ===
- Charlevoix Regional County Municipality
- Baie-Saint-Paul, a city
- Rivière du Gouffre
- St. Lawrence River
- List of rivers of Quebec
