= Danielle April =

Canadian artist (born 1949)

- Born: July 1, 1949 (age 77); Rivière-du-Loup, Quebec, Canada
- Education: École des beaux-arts de Québec 1971; Université Laval 1972
- Occupation: Artist
- Known for: Painter; Printmaker graphic artist Installation artist Photographer; Sculptor
- Awards: Prix d’excellence de la Culture Videre 2002

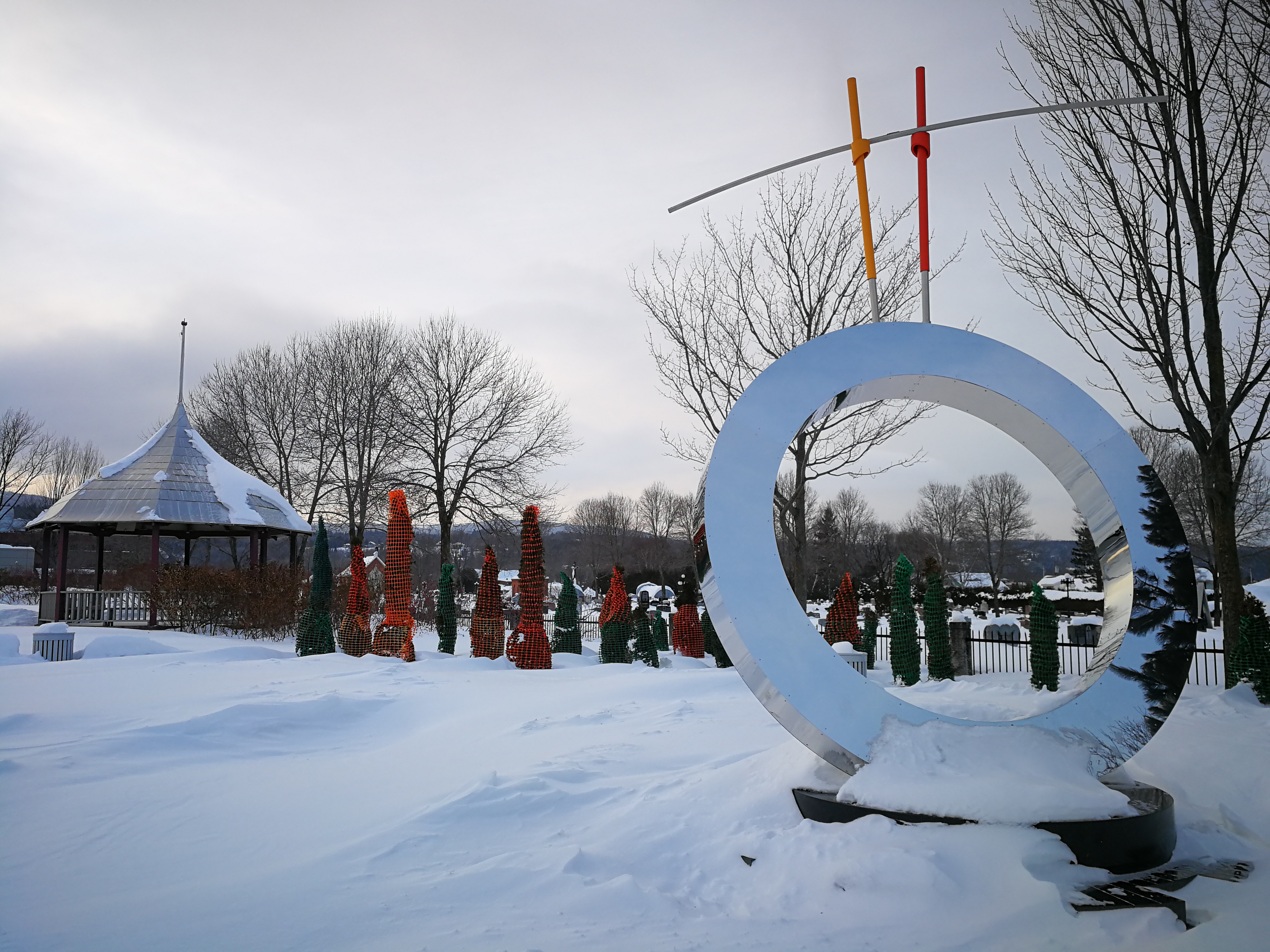

Danielle April (born July 1, 1949) is a Canadian artist working in the fields of painting, sculpture, photography, installation art, printmaking and drawing. April's work often explores time and memory.

== Life and work ==
Danielle April was born on July 1, 1949, in Rivière-du-Loup, Quebec. April studied art at the École des beaux-arts de Québec, graduating in 1971, followed by earning a bachelor's degree in visual arts at the Université Laval in 1972. She lives and works in Quebec City. Time and memory are common themes in April's artwork. In 2002, April received the Prix d'excellence de la Culture Videre from the Québec City.

== Permanent collections ==
- Attente illusoire III, 1983, mixed media, Musée national des beaux-arts du Québec
- Precarious Balance, 2009, sculpture, Citizen's Park, Baie-Saint-Paul, Quebec
