= Rivière du Gouffre Sud-Ouest =

Location
- Country: Canada
- Province: Quebec
- Region: Capitale-Nationale
- Regional County Municipality: Charlevoix Regional County Municipality
- Unorganized territory and municipality: Lac-Pikauba and Saint-Urbain

Physical characteristics
- Source: Prime Lake
  - location: Lac-Pikauba
  - coordinates: 47.72763°N 70.61481°W
  - elevation: 724 m (2,375 ft)
- Mouth: Rivière du Gouffre
  - location: Saint-Urbain
  - coordinates: 47.65472°N 70.44194°W
  - elevation: 206 m (676 ft)
- Length: 29.5 km (18.3 mi)

Basin features
- Tributaries
  - left: (from the mouth) Discharge of two small lakes, Bergeron stream, stream, discharge of several small lakes, stream, stream, outlet of Lac du Gros Castor, outlet of Lac de la Truite.
  - right: (from the mouth) Discharge from Lac aux Blueuts, two streams, stream from Mouches.

The Rivière du Gouffre Sud-Ouest (English: South-West Pit Cave River) is a tributary of the eastern bank of the intermediate part of the Rivière du Gouffre, flowing in the unorganized territory of Lac-Pikauba and the municipality of Saint-Urbain, in the Charlevoix Regional County Municipality, in the administrative region of the Capitale-Nationale, in the province of Quebec, in Canada.

The lower and middle parts of this valley are served by a secondary forest road. Forestry is the main economic activity in this valley; recreational tourism, second.

The surface of the Gouffre Sud-Ouest river is generally frozen from the beginning of December until the beginning of April; however, safe circulation on the ice is generally done from mid-December to the end of March. The water level of the river varies with the seasons and the precipitation; the spring flood generally occurs in April.

== Geography ==
The Gouffre Sud-Ouest river takes its source from Prime lake (length: 1.6 kilometres (0.99 mi); altitude: 724 metres (2,375 ft)) located in forest area and encased in the mountains. The mouth of this lake is located at the bottom of the bay southeast of the lake, either:

- 5.6 kilometres (3.5 mi) south-east of Petit lac Malbaie which flows into Petite rivière Malbaie;
- 19.7 kilometres (12.2 mi) north-west of the village center of Saint-Urbain;
- 15.3 kilometres (9.5 mi) north-east of the mouth of the south-west Gouffre river (confluence with the rivière du Gouffre);
- 20.2 kilometres (12.6 mi) west of the north-west bank of the Saint Lawrence River (at the height of Saint-Irénée);
- 35.8 kilometres (22.2 mi) west of downtown La Malbaie.

From Prime Lake, the course of the Gouffre Sud-Ouest river descends on 29.5 kilometres (18.3 mi) in a generally deep valley, with a drop of 518 metres (1,699 ft), depending on the segments following:

- 1.8 kilometres (1.1 mi) eastward across Lake Favre (length: 1.3 kilometres (0.81 mi); altitude: 687 metres (2,254 ft)), to its mouth;
- 1.4 kilometres (0.87 mi) east to the Mouches stream (coming from the south). Note: Les Mouches stream turns out to be the outlet of Lac à l'Écluse;
- 6.5 kilometres (4.0 mi) northwards to the outlet (coming from the north-west) from Lac de la Truite, then north-east in a deep valley, bending east at the end segment, to the outlet (coming from the north) of Lac du Gros Castor;
- 5.9 kilometres (3.7 mi) to the east in a deep valley passing south of Mont des Lièvres (altitude: 950 metres (3,120 ft)), Mont des Perdrix (altitude: 953 metres (3,127 ft)), from Mont des Morios and Tette du Mont, to a stream (coming from the north-west);
- 4.8 kilometres (3.0 mi) towards the east by forming a large loop towards the south at the start of the segment, and crossing a long series of rapids, collecting a stream (coming from the northwest), until it is joined by a stream from the northwest;
- 2.6 kilometres (1.6 mi) towards the south-east by collecting a stream (coming from the north-west) and another (coming from the west), up to the stream of Bergeron (coming from the north-east);
- 1.3 kilometres (0.81 mi) to the south by forming a large loop towards the west to collect a stream (coming from the west), up to the outlet of Lac aux Bleuets (coming from the west);
- 2.9 kilometres (1.8 mi) towards the south-east, forming a few loops until the outlet (coming from the north) of two lakes;
- 2.3 kilometres (1.4 mi) towards the south-east by forming some loops, until its mouth.

The Rivière du Gouffre Sud-Ouest flows downstream from a river loop on the west bank of the Rivière du Gouffre, in the municipality of Saint-Urbain. This mouth is located at:

- 4.8 kilometres (3.0 mi) south-west of the village center of Notre-Dame-des-Monts;
- 13.1 kilometres (8.1 mi) north of the village center of Saint-Urbain;
- 9.6 kilometres (6.0 mi) north-west of the village center of Saint-Hilarion;
- 24.2 kilometres (15.0 mi) north of downtown Baie-Saint-Paul;
- 21.9 kilometres (13.6 mi) south-west of La Malbaie town center.

From the mouth of the Gouffre Sud-Ouest river, the current descends on 41.7 kilometres (25.9 mi) with a drop of 202 metres (663 ft) following the course of the rivière du Gouffre which flows into Baie-Saint-Paul in the St. Lawrence River.

== Toponymy ==
According to research carried out in cartography, this toponymic designation appears on the regional map of the Ministry of Lands and Forests, 1915 edition. This designation also appears on regional map number 3-Est, 1943. The toponymic variants of this watercourse are: North-West Arm, South-West Arm, North-West of Rivière du Gouffre, Rivière Croche and Rivière du Gouffre North-West.

The toponym "Rivière du Gouffre Sud-Ouest" was formalized on December 5, 1968 at the Place Names Bank of the Commission de toponymie du Québec.

== Appendices ==
=== Related articles ===
- Charlevoix Regional County Municipality
- Lac-Pikauba, an unorganized territory
- Saint-Urbain, a municipality
- Zec des Martres, a controlled harvesting area
- Rivière du Gouffre
- St. Lawrence River
- List of rivers of Quebec
