= Saint-Aimé-des-Lacs =

- Municipality
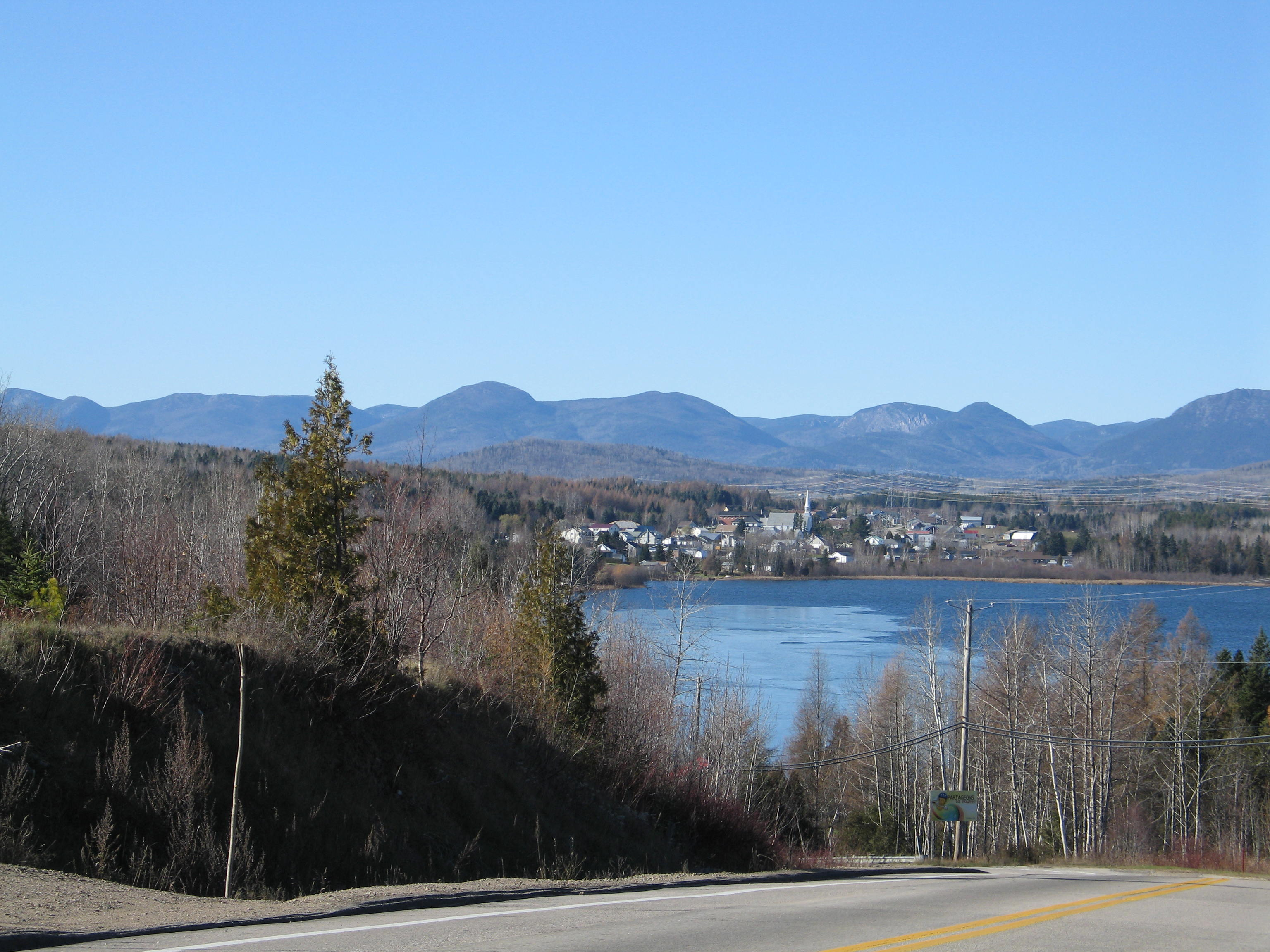
- Lake Sainte-Marie

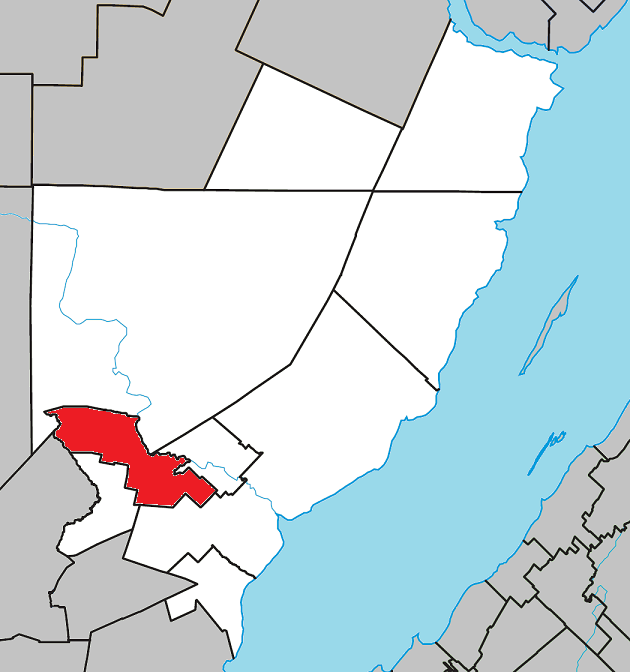
- Location within Charlevoix-Est RCM

- Location in central Quebec
- Coordinates: 47°41′N 70°18′W
- Country: Canada
- Province: Quebec
- Region: Capitale-Nationale
- RCM: Charlevoix-Est
- Constituted: January 1, 1950

Government
  - Mayor: Claire Gagnon
  - Federal riding: Montmorency—Charlevoix
  - Prov. riding: Charlevoix–Côte-de-Beaupré

Area
  - Total: 97.43 km^{2} (37.62 sq mi)
  - Land: 91.61 km^{2} (35.37 sq mi)

Population (2021)
  - Total: 1,158
  - Density: 12.6/km^{2} (33/sq mi)
  - Pop (2016-21): ▲5.8%
  - Dwellings: 739
- Time zone: UTC−5 (EST)
  - Summer (DST): UTC−4 (EDT)
- Postal code(s): G0T 1S0
- Area codes: 418 and 581
- Highways: R-138
- Website: www.saintaimedeslacs.ca

Saint-Aimé-des-Lacs (French pronunciation: [sɛ̃t‿ɛme de lak]) is a municipality in the Capitale-Nationale region of Quebec, Canada.

Saint-Aimé-des-Lacs is primarily dependent on vacationers and cottagers that support its tourism industry.

== History ==
Settlement began in the 1820s, with the first residents settling around Lake Sainte-Marie (or "Petit Lac"), living as farmers, craftsmen, or forest workers. The area was originally incorporated as part of the Parish Municipality of Sainte-Agnès in 1855. But the territory of the parish was vast and the inhabitants had to travel far to attend parish services.

From the 1920s to 1940, Lake Nairne played an important role in the air mail delivery to the North Shore. Due to its size, the lake was perfectly suited for seaplanes that used the lake as their base.

In 1942, the Parish of Saint-Aimé-des-Lacs was formed, dedicated to Saint Aimé but named in honor of parish priest Aimé Néron (1915-1986). On January 1, 1950, the Municipality of Saint-Aimé-des-Lacs was created from territory ceded by Sainte-Agnès and Notre-Dame-des-Monts.

From the 1950s on, the municipality developed with electrification, paved roads, and a water and sewer network was finally installed in 1974.

== Demographics ==
Historical Census Data - Saint-Aimé-des-Lacs, Quebec

Year	Pop.	±%
1951	715	—
1956	728	+1.8%
1961	800	+9.9%
1966	741	−7.4%
1971	730	−1.5%
1976	805	+10.3%
1981	861	+7.0%
1986	952	+10.6%

Year	Pop.	±%
1991	910	−4.4%
1996	900	−1.1%
2001	955	+6.1%
2006	1,076	+12.7%
2011	1,073	−0.3%
2016	1,095	+2.1%
2021	1,158	+5.8%

Source: Statistics Canada

Private dwellings occupied by usual residents (2021): 517 (total dwellings: 739)

=== Language ===
Mother tongue (2021):

- English as first language: 1.3%
- French as first language: 97.8%
- English and French as first language: 0%
- Other as first language: 0%

== Government ==
List of former mayors:

- Édouard Simard (1950–1957)
- Octave Maltais (1957–1961)
- Henri Dallaire (1961–1969, 1979–1981)
- Adélard Thivierge (1969–1979)
- Michel Dufour (1981–1991)
- Jean Michel Gagnon (1991–1995)
- Daniel Boudreault (1995–2005)
- Bernard Maltais (2005–2013)
- Claire Gagnon (2013–present)

== See also ==
- Rivière du Gouffre
- List of municipalities in Quebec
