= Rivière des Mares =

Location
- Country: Canada
- Province: Quebec
- Region: Capitale-Nationale
- Regional County Municipality: Charlevoix Regional County Municipality
- City: Baie-Saint-Paul

Physical characteristics
- Source: Lac de la Rivière des Mares
  - location: Baie-Saint-Paul
  - coordinates: 47.50045°N 70.64079°W
  - elevation: 507 m (1,663 ft)
- Mouth: Rivière du Gouffre
  - location: Baie-Saint-Paul
  - coordinates: 47.47361°N 70.51805°W
  - elevation: 19 m (62 ft)
- Length: 13.8 km (8.6 mi)

Basin features
- Tributaries
  - left: (from the mouth) Acul stream, discharge from a small lake, Étangs stream, stream.
  - right: (from the mouth) Mare Plate stream, two streams, Louisbourg stream, discharge from a small lake, stream, ruisseau du Pied du Mont, La Grosse Décharge Ouest.

The rivière des Mares is a tributary of the west bank of the lower part of the Rivière du Gouffre, flowing entirely in the town of Baie-Saint-Paul, in the Charlevoix Regional County Municipality, in the administrative region of Capitale-Nationale, in the province from Quebec, to Canada.

This valley is mainly served by the route 138 (boulevard de Monseigneur-De Laval) which runs along the west side of the Rivière du Gouffre, and the chemin de Louisbourg which partially goes up this valley. The intermediate and upper parts being mountainous have few passable roads. Besides the agricultural area in the Gouffre river valley, forestry is the main economic activity in this valley.

The surface of the Mares River is generally frozen from the beginning of December until the beginning of April; however, safe circulation on the ice is generally done from mid-December to the end of March. The water level of the river varies with the seasons and the precipitation; the spring flood generally occurs in April.

== Geography ==
The Rivière des Mares rises at the mouth of Lac de la Rivière des Mares (length: 0.9 kilometres (0.56 mi); altitude: 507 metres (1,663 ft)). This lake is enclosed between the mountains, a summit of which reaches 774 metres (2,539 ft) at 0.76 kilometres (0.47 mi) to the southwest; another peak reaches 969 metres (3,179 ft) at 3.25 kilometres (2.02 mi) to the northwest. The mouth of this lake is located at:

- 2.5 kilometres (1.6 mi) south of Lac Rémy, i.e. the head lake of Remy River;
- 12.7 kilometres (7.9 mi) north-east of the course of the Sainte-Anne River;
- 11.7 kilometres (7.3 mi) west of the mouth of the Mares river (confluence with the Gouffre river);
- 12.1 kilometres (7.5 mi) north-west of Baie-Saint-Paul town center.

From its source, the course of the Mares river descends on 13.8 kilometres (8.6 mi) in a plain on the west bank of the Gouffre river, with a drop of 488 metres (1,601 ft) , according to the following segments:

- 2.0 kilometres (1.2 mi) towards the south-east down the mountain, to La Grosse Décharge Ouest (coming from the west);
- 0.8 kilometres (0.50 mi) south-east to the Pied du Mont stream (coming from the south-west);
- 3.4 kilometres (2.1 mi) towards the northeast by collecting a stream (coming from the northwest), forming a big curve towards the north to go around a mountain (located on the south side) whose summit reaches 474 metres (1,555 ft) and passing from the south side of the Mountain to Roch (altitude: 521 metres (1,709 ft)), up to the Étangs stream (coming from the north);
- 2.8 kilometres (1.7 mi) towards the south-east in a deep valley to the Louisbourg stream (coming from the south);
- 2.9 kilometres (1.8 mi) towards the south-east in a less and less steep valley and crossing the route 138 at the end of the segment, up to the stream of the 'Acul (coming from the northwest);
- 1.9 kilometres (1.2 mi) to the east, winding through an agricultural area crossing forest islets, then north, to its mouth.

The Mares river flows in a bend on the southwest bank of the Gouffre river in Baie-Saint-Paul. This mouth is located at:

- 0.7 kilometres (0.43 mi) west of route 138;
- 4.2 kilometres (2.6 mi) north-west of downtown Baie-Saint-Paul;
- 5.4 kilometres (3.4 mi) north-west of the confluence of the Rivière du Gouffre and Saint-Laurent river.

From the mouth of the Mares river, the current descends on 7.8 kilometres (4.8 mi) with a drop of 15 metres (49 ft) following the course of the Gouffre river which flows in Baie-Saint-Paul in the Saint-Laurent river.

== Toponymy ==
During the history, this river was designated under several names with several orthographic variations: Rivière à la Truite, Ruisseau des Marées, Rivière Lamarre, Rivière des Mars, Rivière de la Mare and finally Rivière des Mares. According to some research that the Commission de toponymie du Québec has learned about, the current official name may have originated in the former Domaine de la Mare à la Truite. The latter takes its name from a small body of water located at the bottom of the valley. The use of the name "Rivière de la Mare" is old since it is found mentioned in the delimitation of the lands of Baie-Saint-Paul in 1716.

The toponym "Rivière des Mares" was formalized on March 25, 1997, at the Place Names Bank of the Commission de toponymie du Québec.

== Appendices ==
=== Related articles ===
- Charlevoix Regional County Municipality
- Baie-Saint-Paul, a city
- Ruisseau du Pied du Mont
- La Grosse Décharge Ouest
- Rivière du Gouffre
- St. Lawrence River
- List of rivers of Quebec
