= Saint-Hilarion, Quebec =

Saint-Hilarion
- Parish municipality
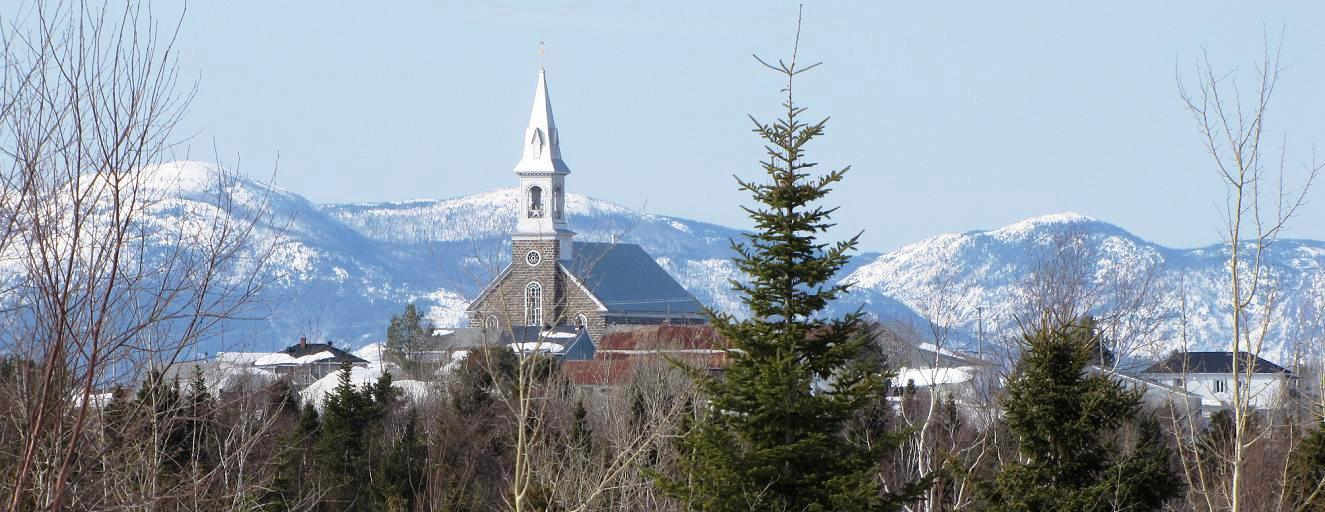

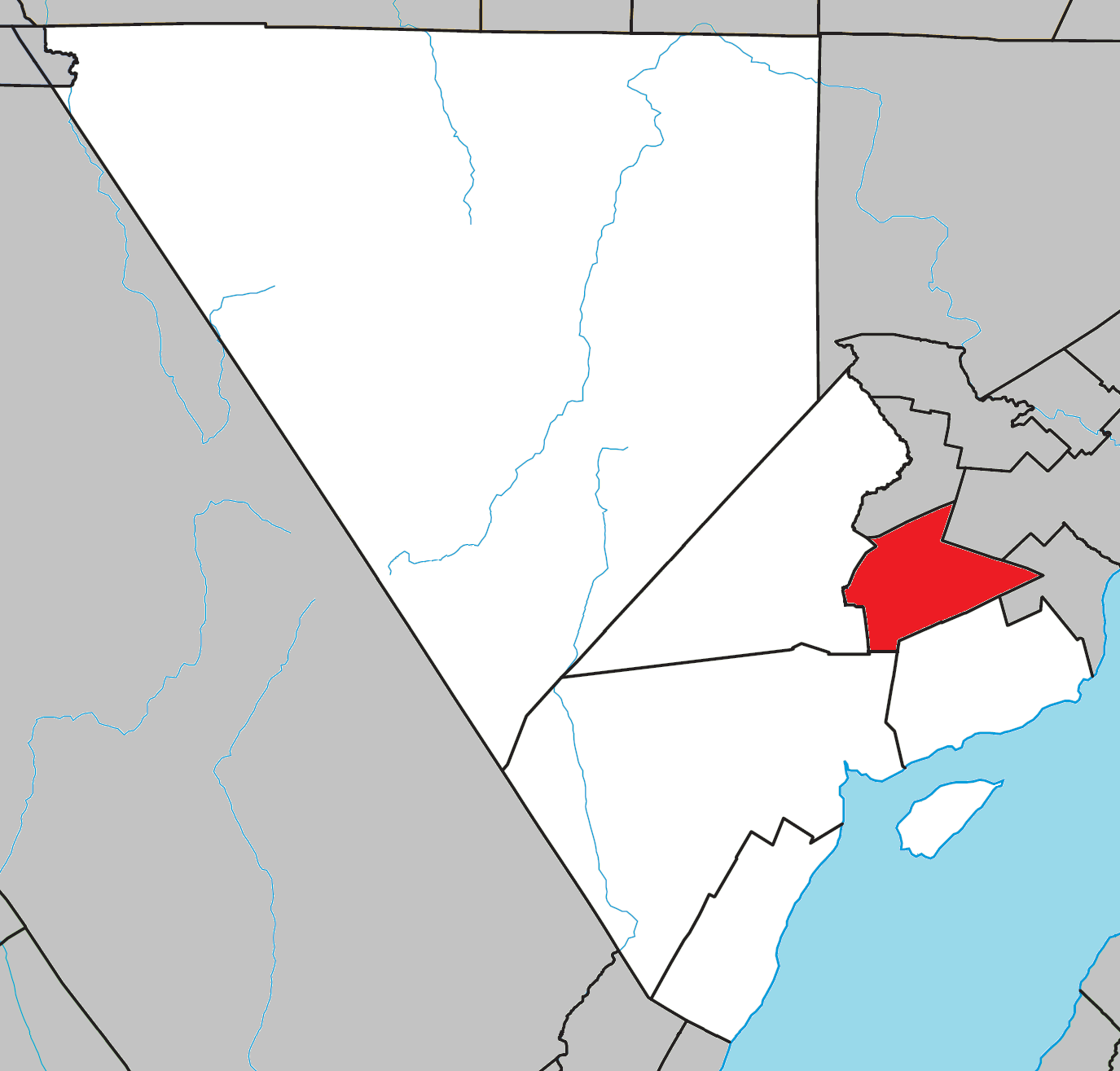
- Location within Charlevoix RCM

- Location in central Quebec
- Coordinates: 47°34′N 70°24′W
- Country: Canada
- Province: Quebec
- Region: Capitale-Nationale
- RCM: Charlevoix
- Constituted: July 1, 1855

Government
  - Mayor: Patrick Lavoie
  - Federal riding: Montmorency—Charlevoix
  - Prov. riding: Charlevoix–Côte-de-Beaupré

Area
  - Total: 101.17 km^{2} (39.06 sq mi)
  - Land: 100.30 km^{2} (38.73 sq mi)

Population (2021)
  - Total: 1,146
  - Density: 11.4/km^{2} (30/sq mi)
  - Pop (2016-21): ▲1.7%
  - Dwellings: 533
- Time zone: UTC−5 (EST)
  - Summer (DST): UTC−4 (EDT)
- Postal code(s): G0A 3V0
- Area codes: 418 and 581
- Highways: R-138
- Website: www.sainthilarion.ca

Saint-Hilarion (French pronunciation: [sɛ̃t‿ilaʁjɔ̃]) is a parish municipality in Charlevoix Regional County Municipality, in the administrative region of Capitale-Nationale of the province of Quebec, Canada.

It is named after Saint Hilarion.

== History ==
In 1822. the geographic township of Settrington was proclaimed, named after a village in Yorkshire, England. Colonization of the area began in 1830 with the arrival of the first settlers from Les Éboulements.

In 1855, the Township Municipality of Settrington was created, followed by the parish of Saint-Hilarion-de-Settrington in 1860. That same year, the Settrington Post Office opened (renamed to Saint-Hilarion Post Office in 1892).

In 1956, the Township Municipality of Settrington changed statutes and its name to become the Parish Municipality of Saint-Hilarion.

== Geography ==
The landscape of Saint-Hilarion, with an altitude of 500 metres (1,600 ft), is dotted by several lakes, such as Lac aux Bois-Verts and Lac à la Mine.

Rivers flowing through the municipality are:

- Jean-Noël River
- Rivière du Premier Rang
- Rivière à la Loutre (Gouffre River tributary)
- Rivière de Chicago

=== Geology ===
The municipality of Saint-Hilarion lies about 10 kilometres (6.2 mi) from the center of the Charlevoix impact structure, discovered in 1968 and which, in 2009, is considered the thirteenth largest impact structure identified on Earth. (The municipality of Les Éboulements being the center). Its soil, as in many municipalities in Charlevoix, is full of impactite, rocky material found at the site of a meteoric impact. An asteroid with a diameter of 2 kilometres (1.2 mi) struck the Charlevoix region about 350 million years ago, creating an impact structure 56 kilometres (35 mi) in diameter. The Charlevoix region is known for its regular seismic activity within the Charlevoix Seismic Zone, even if the tremors are not always felt. There is a tremor every two days, very weak magnitude.

Major earthquakes felt in Saint-Hilarion:

- 1534 (IX on the Mercalli scale)
- 1663 (IX on the Mercalli scale)
- 1791 (VIII on the Mercalli scale)
- 1870 (IX on the Mercalli scale)
- 1925 (6.2 on the Richter scale)
- 1988 (5.9 on the Richter scale)

== Demographics ==
In the 2021 Census of Population conducted by Statistics Canada, Saint-Hilarion had a population of 1,146 living in 492 of its 533 total private dwellings, a change of 1.7% from its 2016 population of 1,127. With a land area of 100.3 km^{2} (38.7 sq mi), it had a population density of 11.4/km^{2} (29.6/sq mi) in 2021.

Historical census populations – Saint-Hilarion, Quebec

Year	Pop.	±%
1861	540	—
1871	862	+59.6%
1881	1,020	+18.3%
1891	1,099	+7.7%
1901	1,035	−5.8%
1911	991	−4.3%
1921	854	−13.8%
1931	917	+7.4%

Year	Pop.	±%
1941	986	+7.5%
1951	1,143	+15.9%
1956	1,157	+1.2%
1961	1,182	+2.2%
1966	1,222	+3.4%
1971	1,138	−6.9%
1976	1,087	−4.5%
1981	1,178	+8.4%

Year	Pop.	±%
1986	1,245	+5.7%
1991	1,185	−4.8%
1996	1,215	+2.5%
2001	1,148	−5.5%
2006	1,191	+3.7%
2011	1,181	−0.8%
2016	1,127	−4.6%
2021	1,146	+1.7%

Source: Statistics Canada

Mother tongue (2021)

Language	Population	Pct (%)
French only	1,140	99.6%
English only	5	0.4%
Both English and French	0	0.0%
Non-official languages	5	0.4%

== Government ==
List of former mayors:

- Rosaire Lavoie (...–2005, 2009–2013)
- Rénald Marier (2005–2009, 2013–2017)
- Patrick Lavoie (2017–present)

== Notable people ==
The most famous native of Saint-Hilarion is the journalist Olivar Asselin (1874-1937), who participated in the founding of the newspaper Le Devoir in 1910.

== See also ==
- Charlevoix Regional County Municipality
- List of municipalities in Quebec
