= Rivière du Gouffre =

River in Charlevoix (Québec, Canada)

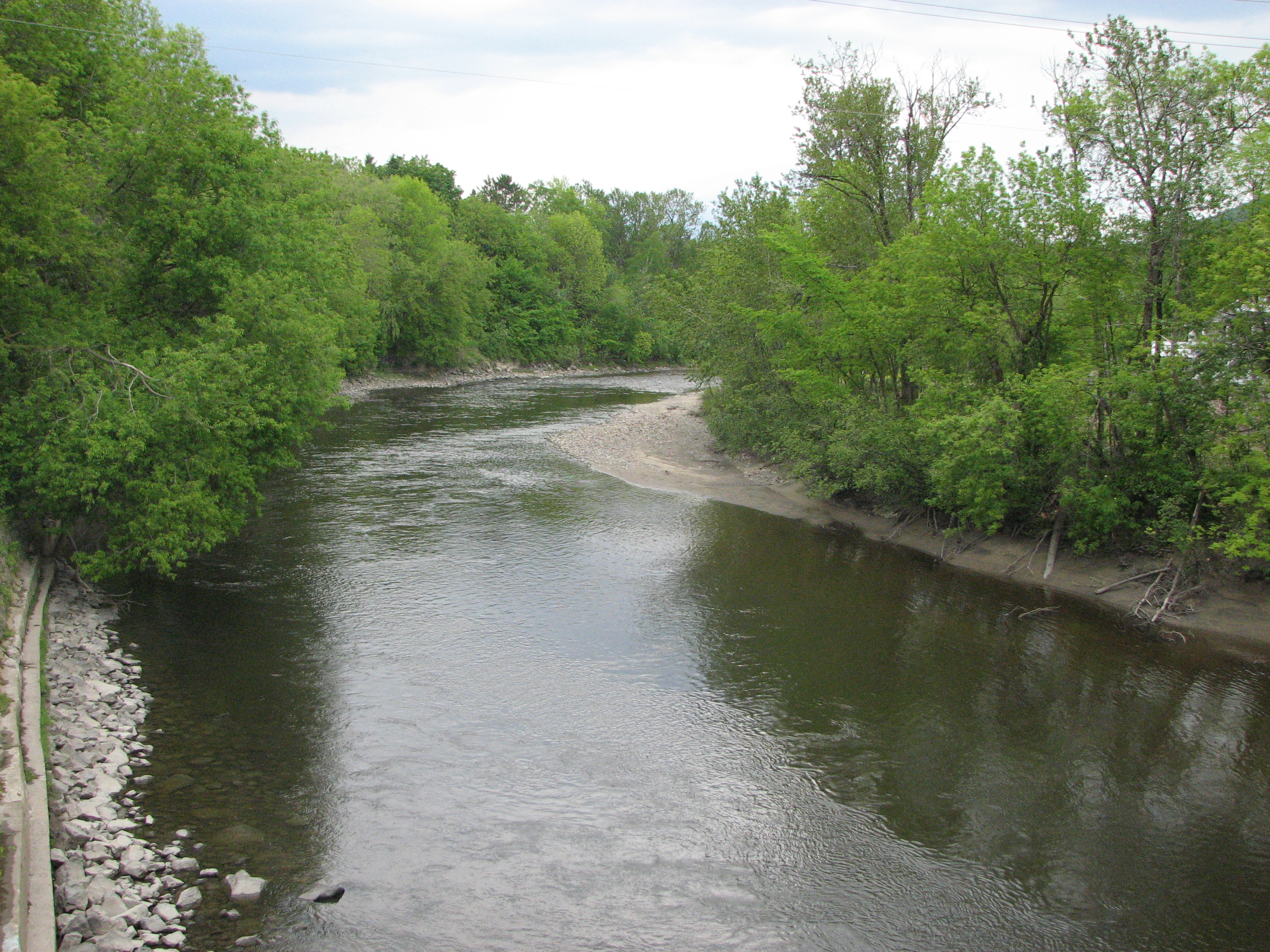
- The Rivière du Gouffre at Baie-Saint-Paul.

Location
- Country: Canada
- Province: Quebec
- Region: Capitale-Nationale
- Regional County Municipality: Charlevoix Regional County Municipality
- City: Baie-Saint-Paul

Physical characteristics
- Source: Lac du Cœur
  - location: Lac-Pikauba
  - coordinates: 47.848478°N 70.567861°W
  - elevation: 823 m (2,700 ft)
- Mouth: St. Lawrence River
  - location: La Malbaie
  - coordinates: 47.75528°N 69.95361°W
  - elevation: 4 m (13 ft)
- Length: 76.1 km (47.3 mi)
- Basin size: 1,010 km (627.58 mi)
- Discharge
  - location: Baie-Saint-Paul

Basin features
- Tributaries
  - left: (from the mouth) Ruisseau du rang Saint-Laurent, ruisseau Gobeil, ruisseau de la Goudronnerie, ruisseau aux rats musqués, ruisseau du Cap Martin, décharge du Lac à la Mine, rivière à la Loutre (Gouffre River tributary), rivière de Chicago, décharge du Lac aux Brochets, ruisseau des Bouliane, ruisseau des Bergeron, décharge du Lac Nice.
  - right: (from the mouth) Bras du Nord-Ouest, rivière à Renaud, rivière de la Mare, rivière Rémy, Le Gros Bras, ruisseau des Cygnes, ruisseau à l'Empêche, rivière du Gouffre Sud-Ouest, décharge du Lac Boudreau, rivière des Îlets (Gouffre River tributary).

The rivière du Gouffre (English: Pit Cave River) is a tributary of the left bank of the Saint-Laurent river, flowing into the Capitale-Nationale administrative region, Quebec (Canada). This watercourse flows through Regional County Municipality from:

- Charlevoix-Est: unorganized territory of Mont-Élie (Lacoste township), municipalities of Saint-Aimé-des-Lacs and Notre-Dame-des-Monts;
- Charlevoix Regional County Municipality: unorganized territory of Lac-Pibauka (Zec des Martres), municipality of Saint-Urbain and town of Baie-Saint-Paul.

This hydrographic slope has 185 lakes and 35 tributaries. The Zec des Martres attracts tens of thousands of visitors each year, particularly because of its mountain trails offering splendid views of the Gouffre River Valley, as well as sport fishing.

== Hydrology ==
The Gouffre River has its source at Lac du Cœur (length: 1.0 km (0.62 mi) altitude: 823 metres (2,700 ft)), in the County of Charlevoix West, in the Zec des Martres which is located east of the Grands-Jardins National Park and west of Hautes-Gorges-de-la-Rivière-Malbaie National Park. Lac du Coeur is located at 4.4 km (2.7 mi) west of Lac des Martres and 2.0 km (1.2 mi) west of the Charlevoix-Est County boundary.

The water separation line (altitude: 910 metres (2,990 ft)) between Petit lac Tristan (slope of the Malbaie River) and the brook of the Mountain (slope of the Montmorency River) is located 43.41 kilometres (26.97 mi) west of the northwest shore of the St. Lawrence River (near the hamlet of Petite-Rivière). From this water separation line, the Malbaie River bypasses the valley of the rivière du Gouffre in a clockwise direction, to flow to La Malbaie in the Saint Lawrence River. The hydrographic slope of the Rivière du Gouffre stretches inland up to 47.6 kilometres (29.6 mi) northwest of the mouth of the river.

The Rivière du Gouffre flows towards the Southwest for a total distance of 76.1 km (47.3 mi) before reaching the Saint-Laurent at Baie-Saint-Paul. Its course runs along the western boundary of the municipality of Notre-Dame-des-Monts and crosses Saint-Urbain. This river is characterized by its sinuosities and the presence of many rapids.

The river Gouffre flows on 76.1 km (47.3 mi) according to the following segments:

Upper course of the river (segment of 14.5 km (9.0 mi))

From the mouth of the Lac du Coeur, the Rivière du Gouffre flows over:

- 0.2 km (0.12 mi) northwesterly to the east shore of Lac du Gouffre;
- 0.5 km (0.31 mi) southwesterly across Lac du Gouffre (length: 0.8 km (0.50 mi); altitude: 819 m (2,687 ft));
- 1.0 km (0.62 mi) south-east to a small lake (altitude: 760 m (2,490 ft));
- 5.8 km (3.6 mi) south-east to the confluence of a creek (coming from the northeast);
- 4.4 km (2.7 mi) south to the confluence of the rivière des Îlets (coming from the West);
- 0.6 km (0.37 mi) southeasterly to the limit of the Lacoste township;
- 2.0 km (1.2 mi) easterly to Lacoste Township, to the western limit of De Sales Township (Saint-Aimé-des-Lacs).

Intermediate course of the river (segment of 27.3 km (17.0 mi))

From the western limit of De Sales Township, the Gouffre River flows over:

- 4.3 km (2.7 mi) to the South-East, forming the boundary between the canton of Lacoste and the canton of De Sales, and collecting the waters of the dump of Lake Nice (coming from North-East);
- 3.6 km (2.2 mi) to the southeast, forming the boundary between Saint-Aimé-des-Lacs and Saint-Urbain, the limit of Notre-Dame-des-Monts;
- 5.4 km (3.4 mi) to the southeast, forming the boundary between Saint-Urbain and Notre-Dame-des-Monts, to Bouliane Creek (from the North);
- 2.4 km (1.5 mi) to the South winding to the outlet of the Lac aux Brochets (coming from the East);
- 3.9 km (2.4 mi) southwesterly winding to the confluence of the Chicago River (coming from the Southeast);
- 0.3 km (0.19 mi) southwesterly to the rivière du Gouffre Sud-Ouest (coming from the North);
- 1.6 km (0.99 mi) southwesterly to the rivière à la Loutre (Gouffre River tributary) (coming from the South-East);
- 3.9 km (2.4 mi) southwesterly to Preveche Creek (from the northwest);
- 1.9 km (1.2 mi) southwesterly to the limit of Notre-Dame-des-Monts.

Lower course of the river (segment of 34.3 km (21.3 mi))

From the limit of Notre-Dame-des-Monts, the river Gouffre flows over:

- 1.3 km (0.81 mi) to the southwest in Saint-Urbain to the outlet of the Lac à la Mine (coming from the South-East);
- 2.3 km (1.4 mi) southwesterly to Swan Creek (from the northwest);
- 5.4 km (3.4 mi) southwesterly to the river Le Gros Bras (Gouffre River tributary) (coming from the northwest);
- 2.5 km (1.6 mi) southwesterly winding up to the road bridge of the village of Saint-Urbain;
- 5.3 km (3.3 mi) southeasterly to the bridge route 138;
- 0.2 km (0.12 mi) south to the city limit of Baie-Saint-Paul;
- 5.8 km (3.6 mi) to the South winding in Baie-Saint-Paul, until the confluence of the Rémy River (coming from the West);
- 0.2 km (0.12 mi) southeasterly collecting the discharge from the Mares river (coming from the south), to the confluence of the ruisseau de la Goudronnerie (coming from the Northeast);
- 3.5 km (2.2 mi) towards the south by zigzagging and collecting the Gobeil stream (coming from the east), up to the rivière des Mares (coming from the south);
- 4.6 kilometres (2.9 mi) to the south, winding through an agricultural zone, collecting the discharge from the Renaud river (coming from the west) and entering an urban zone at the end of the segment, until the confluence of the Bras du Nord-Ouest (Gouffre River tributary) (coming from the West);
- 1.1 km (0.68 mi) southerly forming a northeasterly curve to the road bridge;
- 2.1 km (1.3 mi) southeasterly to the confluence of the river.

The Gouffre River empties onto the "Bay Bank" on the North Shore of the St. Lawrence River in front of Île aux Coudres. At the confluence of the river, the strike is long 1.8 km (1.1 mi) to the southeast at low tide. In addition to the confluence of the Rivière du Gouffre, the main rivers flowing over this strike are (from west to east): Verreault Creek, Rivière du Moulin (Baie-Saint-Paul), Middle Creek, Vases River, Rang Saint-Laurent Creek, Lucien Creek and Bois Blanc Creek.

The watershed of the Rivière du Gouffre covers 1,010 kilometres (627.58 mi). Its main tributaries are the Le Gros Bras, rivière des Mares and the rivière du Gouffre Sud-Ouest. The total slope of the river is 686 m (2,251 ft).

== Toponymy ==
The river Gouffre was named by Samuel de Champlain in 1608. Its name refers to the whirlpool that forms at the foot of Cap aux Corbeaux, downstream from the confluence of the river Gouffre, and which was a source of terror for sailors.

The toponme "Rivière du Gouffre" was formalized on December 5, 1968 at the Commission de toponymie du Québec.

== Recreational tourism activities ==
The Rivière du Gouffre is an Atlantic salmon fishing river and a trout.

At the beginning of the twentieth century, sport fishermen in the Quebec region frequented these waters, which had and still have the reputation of offering large salmon. The population of this species can vary in number significantly from one year to the next. Since 1979, the Association of Conservation of the Valley of the Gouffre (ACVG) manages the salmon fishery. This non-profit organization was formed on March 20, 1979, thanks to the grouping of some forty members. In spring 1979, 100 salmon pits are inventoried in the Rivière du Gouffre. Since then, the ACVG has built 65 of these pits. Pedestrian paths run along the river; picnic tables and shelters have been set up. Two bridges span the river allowing fishermen access to all salmon pits.

== See also ==
- Lac-Pibauka, a TNO
- Mont-Élie, a TNO
- Saint-Aimé-des-Lacs, a municipality
- Notre-Dame-des-Monts, a municipality
- Saint-Urbain, a municipality
- Baie-Saint-Paul, a city
- Charlevoix Regional County Municipality
- St. Lawrence River
- Grands-Jardins National Park
- Zec des Martres, a harversted controlled zone
- List of rivers of Quebec
