= Notre-Dame-des-Monts =

- Municipality
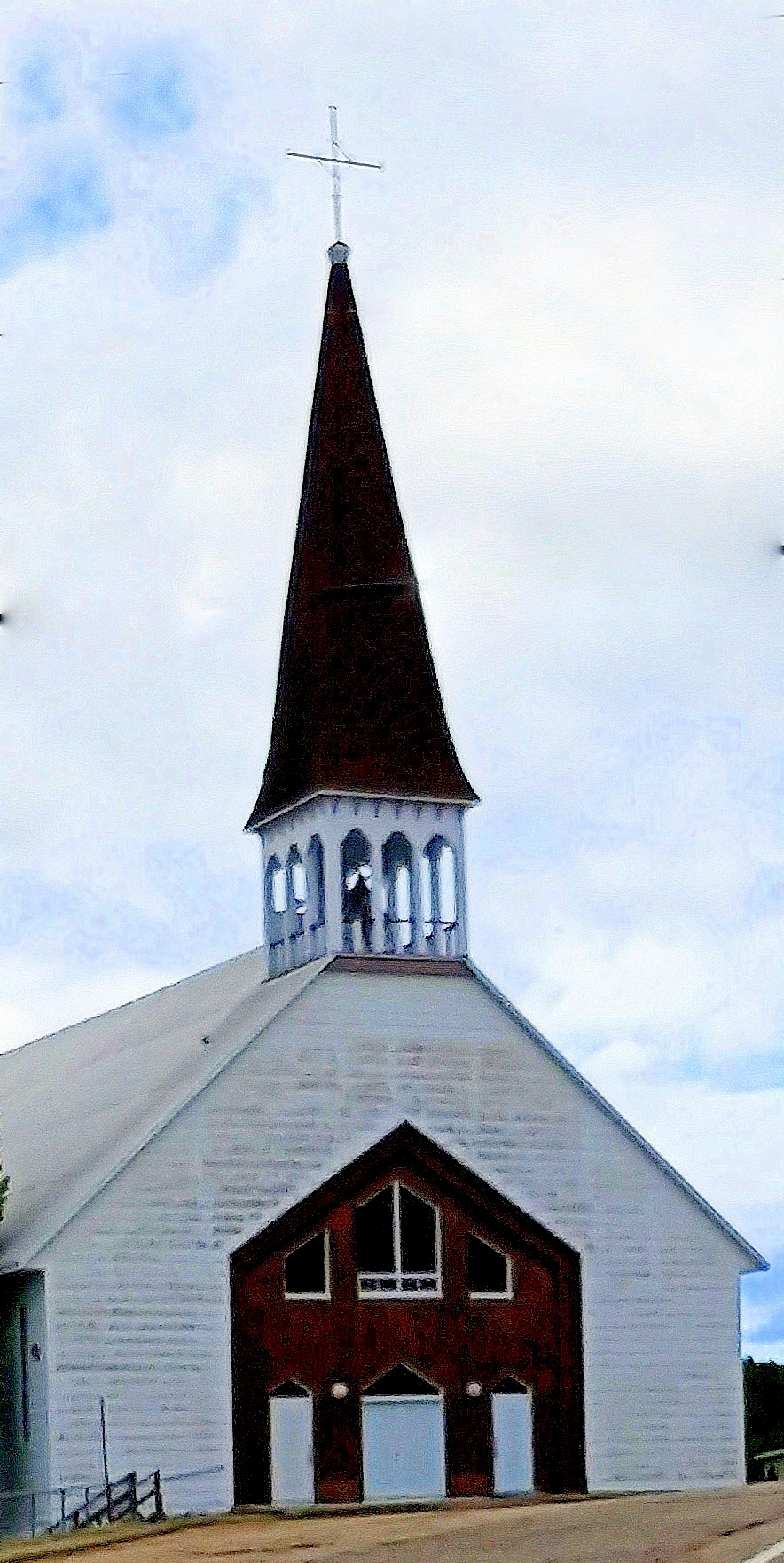
- Motto: D'un mont à l'autre
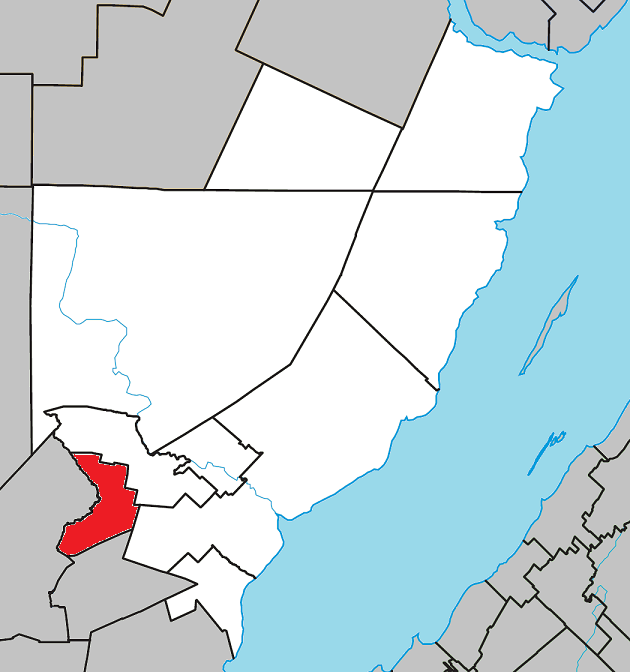
- Location within Charlevoix-Est RCM

- Location in central Quebec
- Coordinates: 47°40′N 70°23′W
- Country: Canada
- Province: Quebec
- Region: Capitale-Nationale
- RCM: Charlevoix-Est
- Constituted: April 11, 1935

Government
  - Mayor: Alexandre Girard
  - Federal riding: Montmorency—Charlevoix
  - Prov. riding: Charlevoix–Côte-de-Beaupré

Area
  - Total: 57.75 km^{2} (22.30 sq mi)
  - Land: 57.93 km^{2} (22.37 sq mi)
- There is an apparent discrepancy between 2 authoritative sources.

Population (2021)
  - Total: 789
  - Density: 13.6/km^{2} (35/sq mi)
  - Pop (2016-21): ▼0.3%
  - Dwellings: 376
- Time zone: UTC−5 (EST)
  - Summer (DST): UTC−4 (EDT)
- Postal code(s): G0T 1L0
- Area codes: 418 and 581
- Highways: No major routes
- Website: www.notredamedesmonts.com

Notre-Dame-des-Monts (French pronunciation: [nɔtʁə dam de mɔ̃]) is a municipality of Charlevoix-Est Regional County Municipality, in the Capitale-Nationale region of Quebec, Canada.

== History ==
The municipality was founded on April 11, 1935, under the name of canton de Sales, named after the geographic township that was proclaimed in 1868 and which was named in turn after the De Sales Laterrière family. In 1947, the parish of Notre-Dame-des-Monts was canonically erected, and the municipality took its name the following year and changed status from township to municipality.

== Geography ==
As its name suggests, the territory of the municipality is dotted with mountains, which are considered among the highest in the southern Canadian Shield. Its main peaks, which are part of the Laurentian massif, include La Noyée, Montagne du Petit Lac, Montagne de Saint-Jean-Baptiste. The Rivière du Gouffre forms its western boundary. It has an area of 57.50 kilometres (35.73 mi).

From the village, a series of mountains resembling a woman lying on her back is visible. The name given to this series of mountains is “La Noyée”. Regional legend says it is the profile of an Indian girl lying on her back, who drowned after being denied marrying her lover.

== Demographics ==
Historical Census Data - Notre-Dame-des-Monts, Quebec

Year	Pop.	±%
1941	856	—
1951	617	−27.9%
1956	688	+11.5%
1961	765	+11.2%
1966	798	+4.3%
1971	821	+2.9%

Year	Pop.	±%
1976	868	+5.7%
1981	951	+9.6%
1986	976	+2.6%
1991	918	−5.9%
1996	913	−0.5%
2001	831	−9.0%

Year	Pop.	±%
2006	764	−8.1%
2011	815	+6.7%
2016	791	−2.9%
2021	789	−0.3%

Population counts are not adjusted for boundary changes.
Source: Statistics Canada

Private dwellings occupied by usual residents (2021): 337 (total dwellings: 376)

=== Language ===
Mother tongue (2021):

- English as first language: 0%
- French as first language: 100%
- English and French as first language: 0%
- Other as first language: 0%

== Government ==
List of former mayors:

- Joseph Girard (1935–1937, 1941–1945)
- Lucien Simard (1937–1941, 1949–1952)
- Louis Guay (1945–1949)
- Thomas Louis Gaudreault (1952–1955)
- Henri Jean (1955–1961)
- Wilfrid Tremblay (1961–1967)
- François Lavoie (1967–1971)
- Alfred Simard (1971–1981)
- Charles Joseph Tremblay (1981–1985)
- Hilaire Girard (1985–1989)
- Jean Claude Simard (1989–2013)
- Mélissa Girard (2013–2017)
- Alexandre Girard (2017–present)

== See also ==
- Rivière du Gouffre
- Rivière de Chicago
- Rivière à la Loutre
- List of municipalities in Quebec
