= Lac-Pikauba =

- Unorganized territory
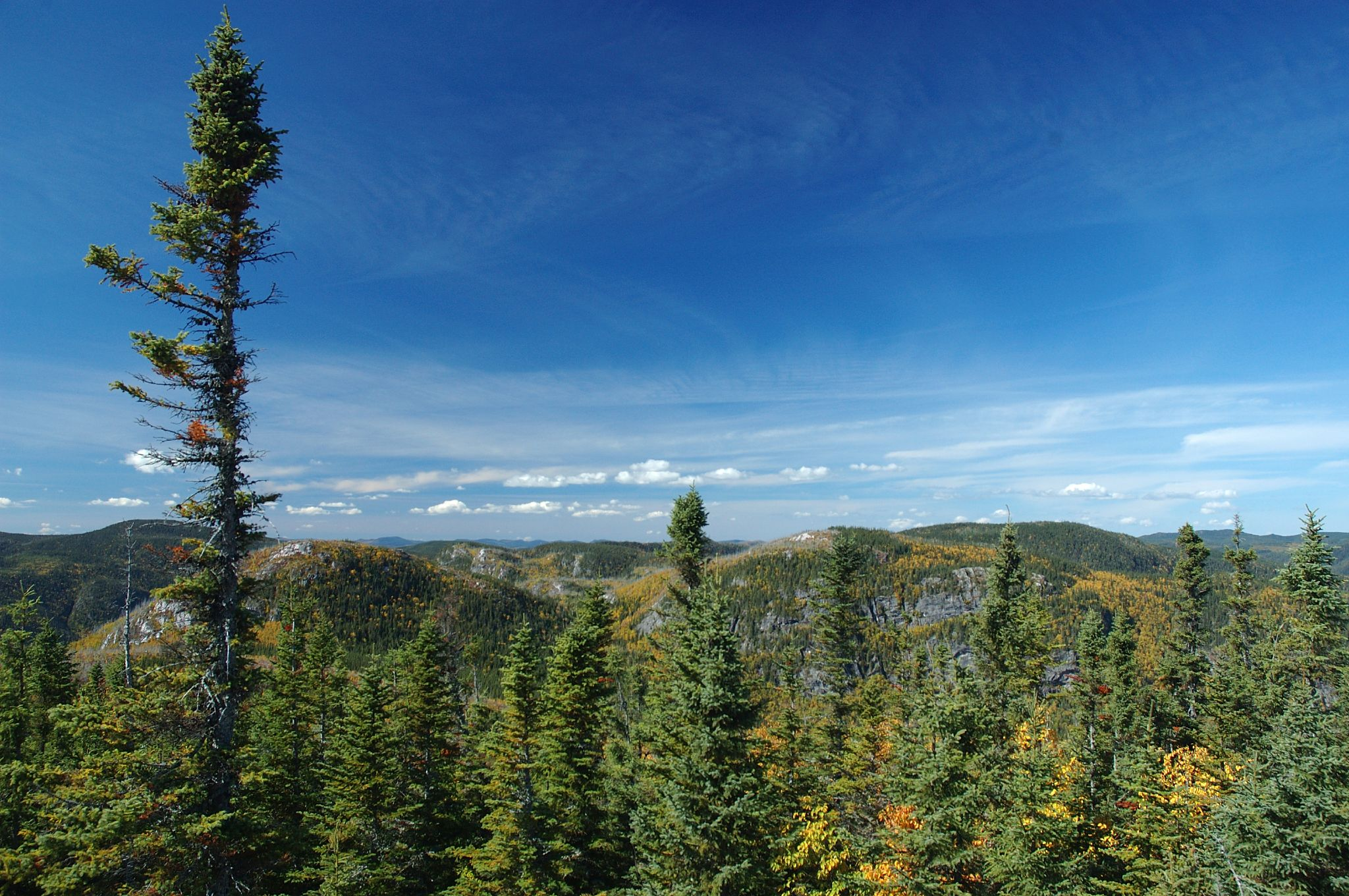
- Grands-Jardins National Park

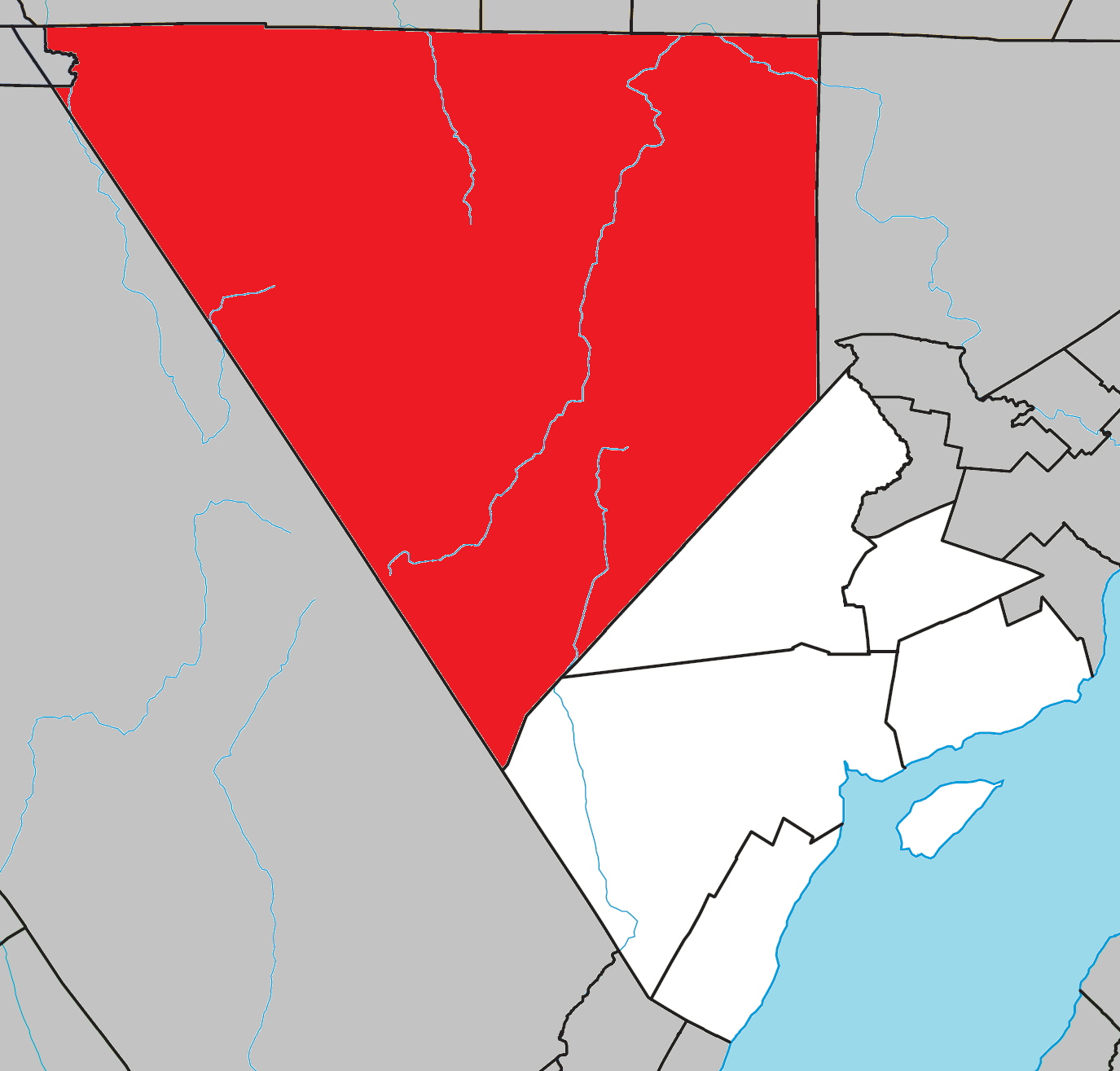
- Location within Charlevoix RCM

- Location in central Quebec
- Coordinates: 47°48′N 71°07′W
- Country: Canada
- Province: Quebec
- Region: Capitale-Nationale
- RCM: Charlevoix
- Constituted: January 1, 1986

Government
  - Federal riding: Montmorency—Charlevoix
  - Prov. riding: Charlevoix–Côte-de-Beaupré

Area
  - Total: 2,528.68 km^{2} (976.33 sq mi)
  - Land: 2,440.54 km^{2} (942.30 sq mi)

Population (2021)
  - Total: 0
  - Density: 0/km^{2} (0/sq mi)
  - Pop (2016-21): N/A
  - Dwellings: 1
- Time zone: UTC−5 (EST)
  - Summer (DST): UTC−4 (EDT)
- Highways: R-169; R-175; R-381

Lac-Pikauba is an unorganized territory in the Capitale-Nationale region of Quebec, Canada. It is a large, unpopulated, undeveloped territory that makes up two-thirds of the Charlevoix Regional County Municipality.

The entire area west of Quebec Route 381, which bisects the territory, is part of the Laurentides Wildlife Reserve and the Grands-Jardins National Park. A portion of the Hautes-Gorges-de-la-Rivière-Malbaie National Park is in the north-eastern part of the territory.

The territory's largest lake is the eponymous Pikauba Lake. This toponym comes from the Montagnais word Opikopau. Opi is a root to indicate that something is enclosed or confined. Kopau describes a lake with alders, reeds, or other. So Pikauba may be translated as "lake narrowed by Alders". The map of provincial surveyor Frederic William Blaiklock from 1852 referred to this lake by the name Chicoutimi Lake.

== Demographics ==
Historical census populations – Lac-Pikauba

Year	Pop.	±%
1991	5	—
1996	0	−100.0%
2001	0	0.00%
2006	0	0.00%

Year	Pop.	±%
2011	0	0.00%
2016	0	0.00%
2021	0	0.00%

2016 Population figure based on revised count.
Source: Statistics Canada

== See also ==
- Rivière du Gouffre, a river
- Savane Lake (Lac-Pikauba), a lake
- Rivière Savane du Nord, a river
- Sainte-Anne River (Beaupré), a river
- Rivière des Îlets (rivière du Gouffre), a river
- Rivière du Gouffre Sud-Ouest, a river
- Rivière des Monts, a river
- Le Gros Bras (Gouffre River tributary), a river
