= Baie-Saint-Paul =

- City
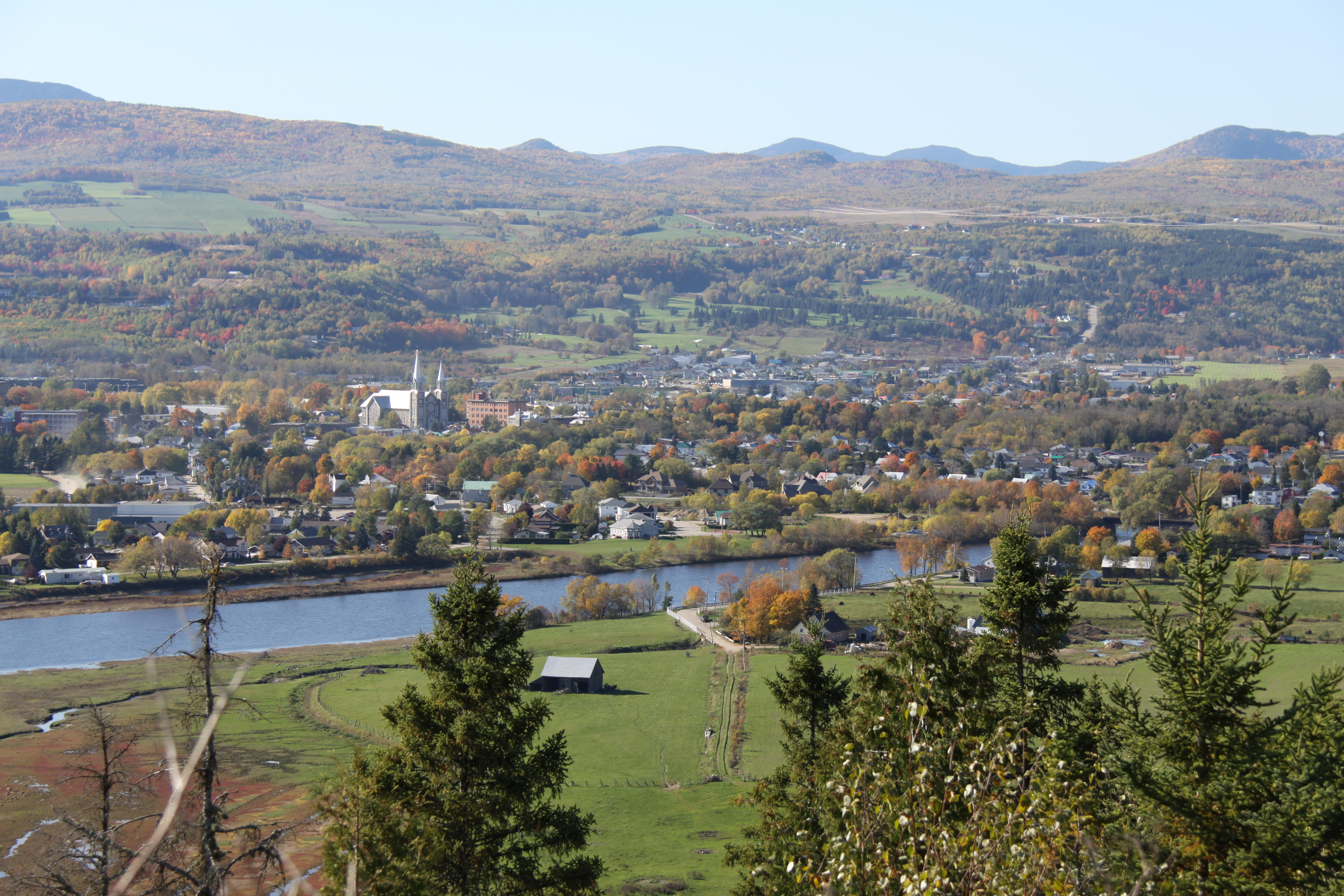

- Coat of arms

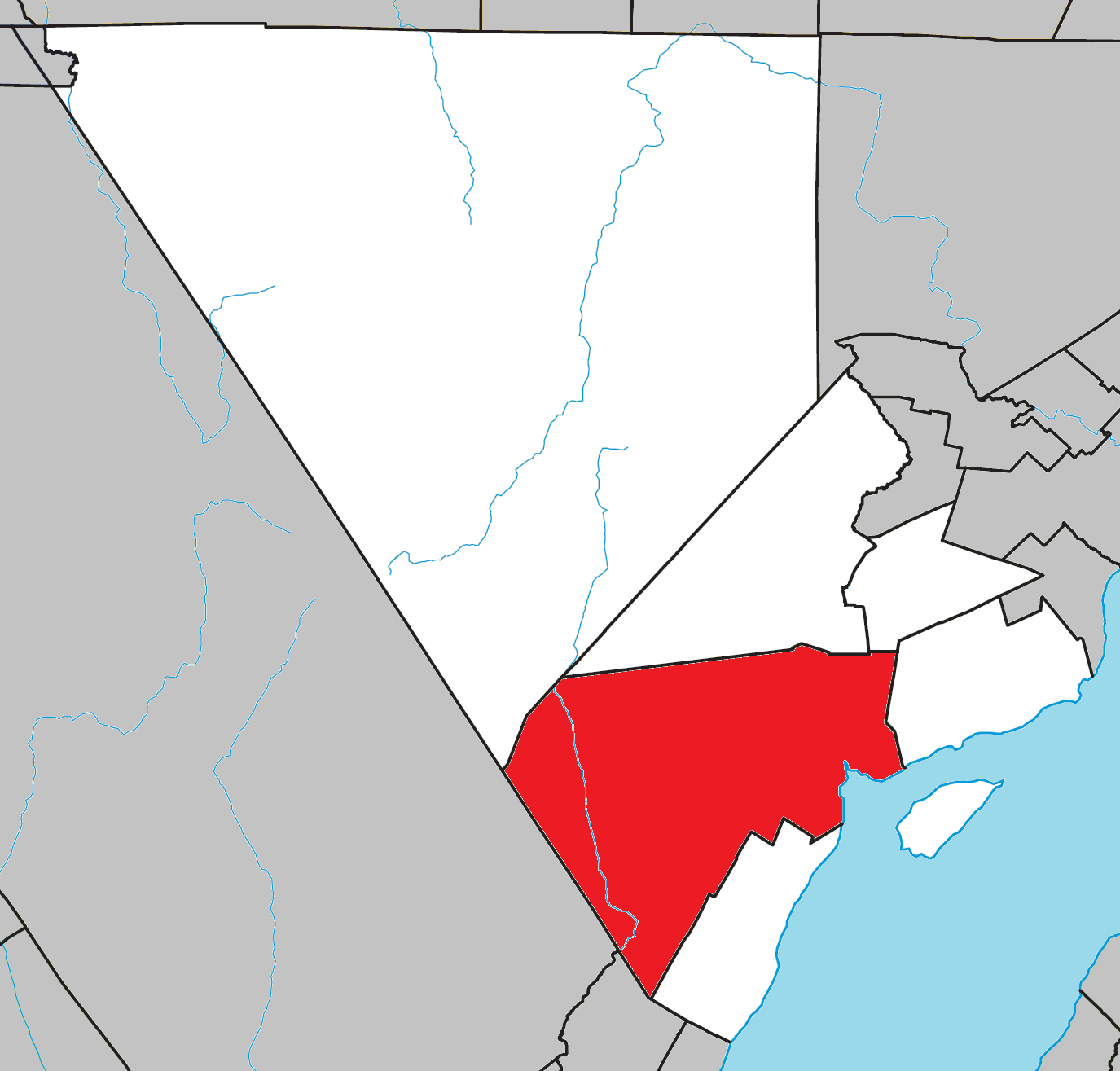
- Location within Charlevoix RCM

- Location in central Quebec
- Coordinates: 47°27′N 70°30′W
- Country: Canada
- Province: Quebec
- Region: Capitale-Nationale
- RCM: Charlevoix
- Constituted: January 3, 1996

Government
  - Mayor: Michaël Pilote
  - Federal riding: Montmorency—Charlevoix
  - Prov. riding: Charlevoix–Côte-de-Beaupré

Area
  - Total: 564.36 km^{2} (217.90 sq mi)
  - Land: 545.85 km^{2} (210.75 sq mi)
  - Urban: 4.03 km^{2} (1.56 sq mi)

Population (2021)
  - Total: 7,371
  - Density: 13.5/km^{2} (35/sq mi)
  - Urban: 4,308
  - Urban density: 1,069.5/km^{2} (2,770/sq mi)
  - Pop (2016-21): ▲3.1%
  - Dwellings: 3,782
- Time zone: UTC−5 (EST)
  - Summer (DST): UTC−4 (EDT)
- Postal code(s): G3Z
- Area codes: 418 and 581
- Highways: R-138; R-362; R-381
- Website: www.baiesaintpaul.com

Baie-Saint-Paul (French pronunciation: [bɛ sɛ̃ pɔl]; 2021 Population 7,371; UA population 4,308) is a city in the Province of Quebec, Canada, on the northern shore of the St. Lawrence River. Baie-Saint-Paul is the seat of Charlevoix Regional County Municipality. The city is situated at the mouth of the Gouffre River.

The place gained some prominence in the 1770s when Doctor Philippe-Louis-François Badelard named a disease he was researching the "Baie-Saint-Paul maladie". This illness was the subject of one of the first medical publications done in Lower Canada. It is also where Cirque du Soleil originated back in the early 1980s and the location of the first show using the name Cirque du Soleil during "La Fete Foraine de Baie-Saint-Paul" in 1984.

== History ==
The bay was first called Baie de l'Ilet on a map by Pierre Desceliers circa 1550, then Baie du Gouffre by Samuel de Champlain in 1632, referring to a whirlpool at the mouth of the Gouffre River at the St. Lawrence. By 1641, the name Baie Saint Paul came in use, and this name appeared in the report of Pierre Boucher to the King of France about the great earthquake of 1663.

The current area of the city was divided between the seigneuries of Côte-de-Beaupré (to the west of the Gouffre River), granted in 1636, and Rivière-du-Gouffre (to the east of the Gouffre River), granted to Pierre Dupré in 1682. Around 1650, the first settlers arrived, making the area one of the first in New France to be colonized. In 1681, the Saint-Pierre-et-Saint-Paul parish was founded, but its canonical erection dates from September 21, 1715.

A visitor in the early 1800s noticed mineral springs and mineral resources in the area.

In 1845, the Parish Municipality of Saint-Pierre et Saint-Paul de la Baie-Saint-Paul was created, but dissolved two years later. It was reestablished in 1855 (its name shortened to Baie-Saint-Paul in 1964). On March 25, 1893, the village itself separated from the parish municipality to form the Village Municipality of Baie Saint-Paul, which changed status to ville in 1913, reverted back to village status in 1922, but regained city status in 1961. In 1921, the parish municipality lost more territory when the newly-founded Municipality of Rivière-du-Gouffre was split off.

On January 3, 1996, the Parish Municipality and the City of Baie-Saint-Paul, along with the Municipality of Rivière-du-Gouffre, were joined again into the new City of Baie-Saint-Paul.

== Geography ==
The town is situated in the wide and deep valley of the Gouffre River, surrounded by the high peaks of Cap aux Corbeaux, Cap aux Rets, Cran Suzette, and Hospice. Its landscape is characterized by sandbanks, striated mountain slopes, waterfalls, streams, fertile meadows, and sandy terraces.

In addition to the main namesake population centre, the city also contains the hamlets of Saint-Placide-de-Charlevoix (47°24′32″N 70°37′33″W), Saint-Placide-Nord (47°27′48″N 70°35′33″W), and La Mare (47°28′49″N 70°31′42″W).

=== Climate ===
Baie-Saint Paul has a humid continental climate with vast seasonal differences. Summers are mild and moderated by its proximity to the Gulf of Saint Lawrence. In winter, interior Canada influences the climate with frequent cold waves.

Climate data for Baie-Saint-Paul
Month	Jan	Feb	Mar	Apr	May	Jun	Jul	Aug	Sep	Oct	Nov	Dec	Year
Record high °C (°F)	11.0 (51.8)	12.0 (53.6)	16.0 (60.8)	30.0 (86.0)	35.5 (95.9)	33.9 (93.0)	35.6 (96.1)	34.0 (93.2)	33.0 (91.4)	25.0 (77.0)	18.5 (65.3)	13.5 (56.3)	35.6 (96.1)
Mean daily maximum °C (°F)	−6.9 (19.6)	−4.5 (23.9)	0.7 (33.3)	7.4 (45.3)	15.6 (60.1)	21.2 (70.2)	23.9 (75.0)	22.5 (72.5)	17.3 (63.1)	10.8 (51.4)	3.5 (38.3)	−3.8 (25.2)	9.0 (48.2)
Daily mean °C (°F)	−12.5 (9.5)	−10.2 (13.6)	−4.4 (24.1)	2.9 (37.2)	10.1 (50.2)	15.6 (60.1)	18.5 (65.3)	17.1 (62.8)	12.2 (54.0)	6.3 (43.3)	−0.5 (31.1)	−8.7 (16.3)	3.9 (39.0)
Mean daily minimum °C (°F)	−18.2 (−0.8)	−16 (3)	−9.5 (14.9)	−1.6 (29.1)	4.5 (40.1)	10.0 (50.0)	12.9 (55.2)	11.7 (53.1)	7.1 (44.8)	1.8 (35.2)	−4.4 (24.1)	−13.5 (7.7)	−1.3 (29.7)
Record low °C (°F)	−36 (−33)	−34.4 (−29.9)	−32 (−26)	−18 (0)	−6.7 (19.9)	−0.5 (31.1)	2.8 (37.0)	0.5 (32.9)	−5 (23)	−9 (16)	−23.9 (−11.0)	−33 (−27)	−36 (−33)
Average precipitation mm (inches)	74.1 (2.92)	63.0 (2.48)	83.5 (3.29)	94.6 (3.72)	95.5 (3.76)	94.7 (3.73)	86.3 (3.40)	85.9 (3.38)	83.4 (3.28)	80.3 (3.16)	79.1 (3.11)	78.8 (3.10)	999.3 (39.34)
Average rainfall mm (inches)	14.0 (0.55)	12.7 (0.50)	39.2 (1.54)	76.1 (3.00)	95.0 (3.74)	94.7 (3.73)	86.3 (3.40)	85.9 (3.38)	83.4 (3.28)	78.5 (3.09)	53.0 (2.09)	9.4 (0.37)	728.0 (28.66)
Average snowfall cm (inches)	60.2 (23.7)	50.4 (19.8)	44.3 (17.4)	17.1 (6.7)	0.5 (0.2)	0 (0)	0 (0)	0 (0)	0 (0)	1.7 (0.7)	26.1 (10.3)	69.4 (27.3)	269.8 (106.2)
Average precipitation days (≥ 0.2 mm)	9.7	7.1	9.4	10.3	11.7	12.5	13.1	13.3	11.1	10.9	9.6	10.5	129.3
Average rainy days (≥ 0.2 mm)	1.5	1.0	4.1	8.9	11.7	12.5	13.1	13.3	11.1	10.7	6.3	1.9	96.2
Average snowy days (≥ 0.2 cm)	8.9	6.3	6.3	2.6	0.07	0	0	0	0	0.41	3.9	9.4	37.8
Source: Environment Canada

== Demographics ==
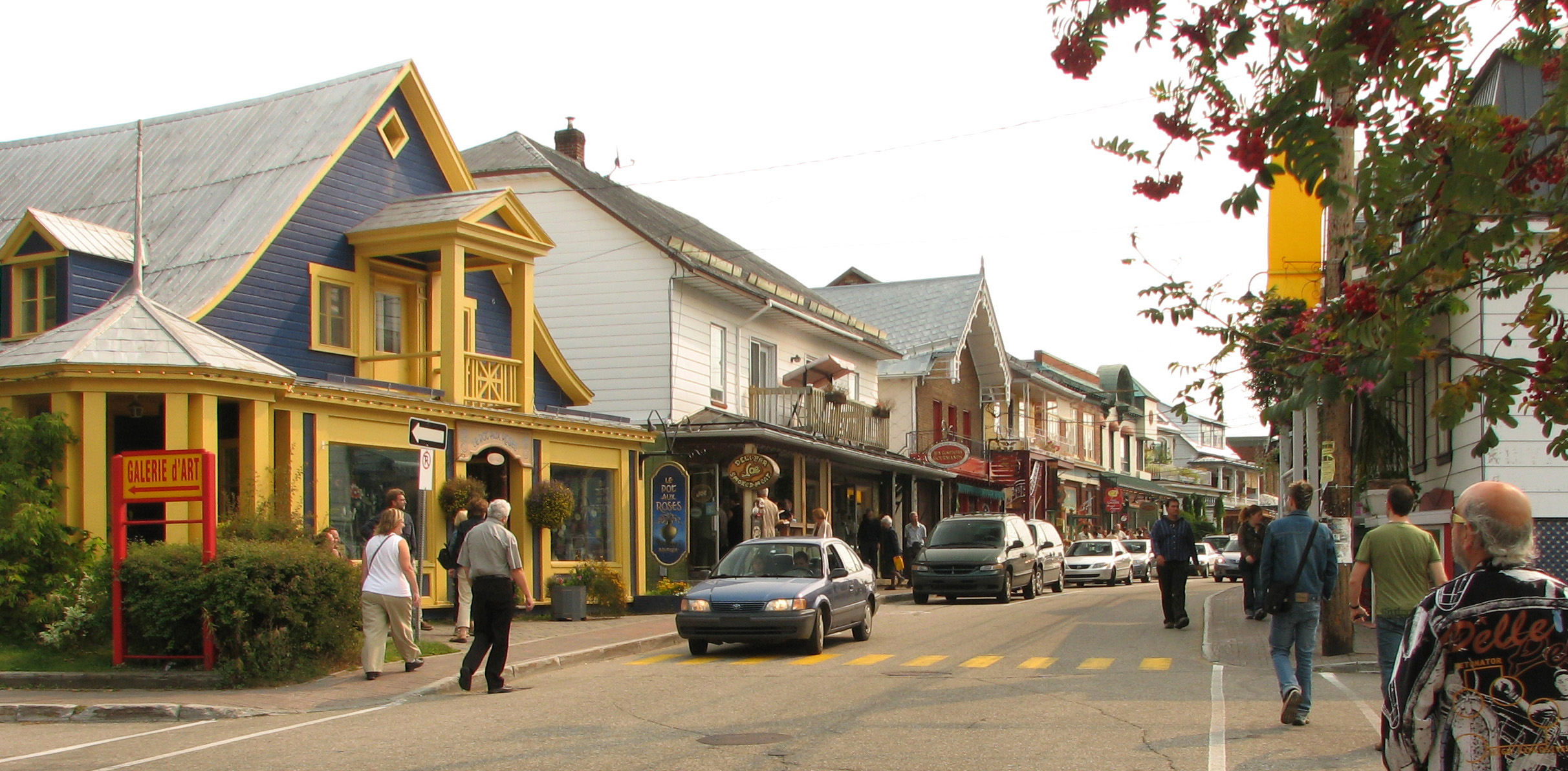
Saint-Jean-Baptiste street

In the 2021 Census of Population conducted by Statistics Canada, Baie-Saint-Paul had a population of 7,371 living in 3,427 of its 3,782 total private dwellings, a change of 3.1% from its 2016 population of 7,146. With a land area of 545.85 km^{2} (210.75 sq mi), it had a population density of 13.5/km^{2} (35.0/sq mi) in 2021.

Historical census populations – Baie-Saint-Paul

Year	Pop.	±%
1901	1,408	—
1911	1,857	+31.9%
1921	2,291	+23.4%
1931	2,916	+27.3%
1941	3,500	+20.0%
1951	3,716	+6.2%
1956	4,052	+9.0%

Year	Pop.	±%
1961	4,674	+15.4%
1966	4,702	+0.6%
1971	4,163	−11.5%
1976	4,066	−2.3%
1981	3,961	−2.6%
1986	3,925	−0.9%
1991	3,733	−4.9%

Year	Pop.	±%
1996	7,379	+97.7%
2001	7,290	−1.2%
2006	7,288	−0.0%
2011	7,332	+0.6%
2016	7,146	−2.5%
2021	7,371	+3.1%

Population counts are not adjusted for boundary changes, or merger in 1996.
Source: Statistics Canada

Mother tongue (2021):

- English as first language: 0.6%
- French as first language: 97.2%
- English and French as first language: 0.5%
- Other as first language: 1.5%

Historical census populations – Baie-Saint-Paul Parish (1855–1995)

Year	Pop.	±%
1871	3,623	—
1881	3,794	+4.7%
1891	3,760	−0.9%
1901	2,519	−33.0%
1911	2,305	−8.5%
1921	2,220	−3.7%

Year	Pop.	±%
1931	1,264	−43.1%
1941	1,347	+6.6%
1951	1,448	+7.5%
1956	1,646	+13.7%
1961	1,268	−23.0%
1966	1,341	+5.8%

Year	Pop.	±%
1971	1,576	+17.5%
1976	1,813	+15.0%
1981	2,029	+11.9%
1986	2,139	+5.4%
1991	2,297	+7.4%

Population counts are not adjusted for boundary changes.
Source: Statistics Canada

Historical census populations – Rivière-du-Gouffre Municipality (1921–1995)

Year	Pop.	±%
1931	667	—
1941	693	+3.9%
1951	727	+4.9%
1956	720	−1.0%

Year	Pop.	±%
1961	658	−8.6%
1966	631	−4.1%
1971	684	+8.4%
1976	834	+21.9%

Year	Pop.	±%
1981	1,222	+46.5%
1986	1,230	+0.7%
1991	1,305	+6.1%

Source: Statistics Canada

== Local government ==
List of former mayors of former City of Baie-Saint-Paul (1893-1995):

- Arsène-Hidalla Simard (1893–1897)
- Pierre D'Auteil (1897–1901)
- Eugène Guillemette (1901–1903)
- J. Onézime Paré (1903–1904, 1919–1921)
- Michel Tremblay (1904–1905)
- Émile Gagnon (1905–1913)
- Médéric Tremblay (1913–1915, 1920–1921)
- François Boivin (1915–1917)
- Joseph Gariépy (1917–1920)
- Euloge Tremblay (1921–1933)
- François-Xavier Gariépy (1933–1935)
- J.-Émile Boivin (1935–1939, 1941–1943)
- J.-Étienne Desgagné (1939–1940)
- Joseph Girard (1940–1941, 1949–1951, 1955–1959)
- Henri Tremblay (1943–1949)
- Charles-Édouard Tremblay (1951–1955, 1959–1962)
- Philippe Harvey (1962–1965, 1970–1972)
- Jean-René Gaudreault (1965–1967)
- Edmour Simard (1967–1970)
- Philippe Desgagné (1972–1974)
- Désiré Ménard (1974–1978)
- Roland Bouchard (1978–1982)
- Augustin Côté (1982–1986)
- Jacinthe Blackburn Simard (1986–1995)

List of former mayors of current City of Baie-Saint-Paul:

- Jacinthe Blackburn Simard (1996–1999)
- Jean Fortin (1999–2021)
- Michaël Pilote (2021–present)

== Notable people ==
- Clarence Gagnon
- René Richard

== See also ==
- 1925 Charlevoix–Kamouraska earthquake
- Charlevoix tourist train
