= Charlevoix Regional County Municipality =

Charlevoix
- Regional county municipality
- Coordinates: 47°29′N 70°29′W
- Country: Canada
- Province: Quebec
- Region: Capitale-Nationale
- Effective: January 1, 1982
- County seat: Baie-Saint-Paul

Government
  - Type: Prefecture
  - Prefect: Patrick Lavoie

Area
  - Total: 3,935.69 km^{2} (1,519.58 sq mi)
  - Land: 3,736.80 km^{2} (1,442.79 sq mi)

Population (2021)
  - Total: 13,371
  - Density: 3.6/km^{2} (9.3/sq mi)
  - Change (2016-21): ▲2.9%
  - Dwellings: 7,516
- Time zone: UTC−5 (EST)
  - Summer (DST): UTC−4 (EDT)
- Area codes: 418 and 581
- Website: www.mrc-charlevoix.com

Charlevoix is a regional county municipality (French: Municipalité Regionale de Comté de Charlevoix) in the Capitale-Nationale region of Quebec, Canada. The seat is Baie-Saint-Paul.

== Subdivisions ==
There are seven subdivisions within the RCM:

Cities & Towns (1)

- Baie-Saint-Paul

Municipalities (3)

- L'Isle-aux-Coudres
- Les Éboulements
- Petite-Rivière-Saint-François

Parishes (2)

- Saint-Hilarion
- Saint-Urbain

Unorganized Territory (1)

- Lac-Pikauba

== Demographics ==
Canada census – Charlevoix Regional County Municipality community profile

	2021	2016
Population	13,371 (+2.9% from 2016)	12,997 (-2.6% from 2011)
Land area	3,736.80 km^{2} (1,442.79 sq mi)	3,763.22 km^{2} (1,452.99 sq mi)
Population density	3.6/km^{2} (9.3/sq mi)	3.5/km^{2} (9.1/sq mi)
Median age	54.8 (M: 53.6, F: 55.6)	52.8 (M: 52.3, F: 53.3)
Private dwellings	7,516 (total) 6,186 (occupied)	7,330 (total) 5,781 (occupied)
Median household income	$68,000	$56,806

References: 2021 2016

Historical census populations – Charlevoix Regional County Municipality

Year	Pop.	±%
1986	13,843	—
1991	13,547	−2.1%
1996	13,437	−0.8%
2001	13,166	−2.0%

Year	Pop.	±%
2006	13,190	+0.2%
2011	13,338	+1.1%
2016	12,997	−2.6%
2021	13,371	+2.9%

Source: Statistics Canada

== Transportation ==
=== Access routes ===
Highways and numbered routes that run through the municipality, including external routes that start or finish at the county border:

- Autoroutes
  - None
- Principal Highways
  - R-138
- Secondary Highways
  - R-362
  - R-381
- External Routes
  - None

== See also ==
- List of regional county municipalities and equivalent territories in Quebec
