= Snigole =

The term Snigole may refer to:

== People ==
- Snigole, a rare name.

== Names ==
- Snigole River, a tributary of the Malbaie River flowing in the unorganized territory of Mont-Élie, in Clermont, in MRC of Charlevoix-Est, in Quebec, in Canada.
- Chemin Snigole, Clermont, in Quebec, in Canada.
- Fall of the Snigole River, falls of the Snigole River in Clermont, in Quebec, in Canada.
