= Charlevoix Biosphere Reserve =

UNESCO Biosphere Reserve in Quebec, Canada

Charlevoix Bisophere Reserve
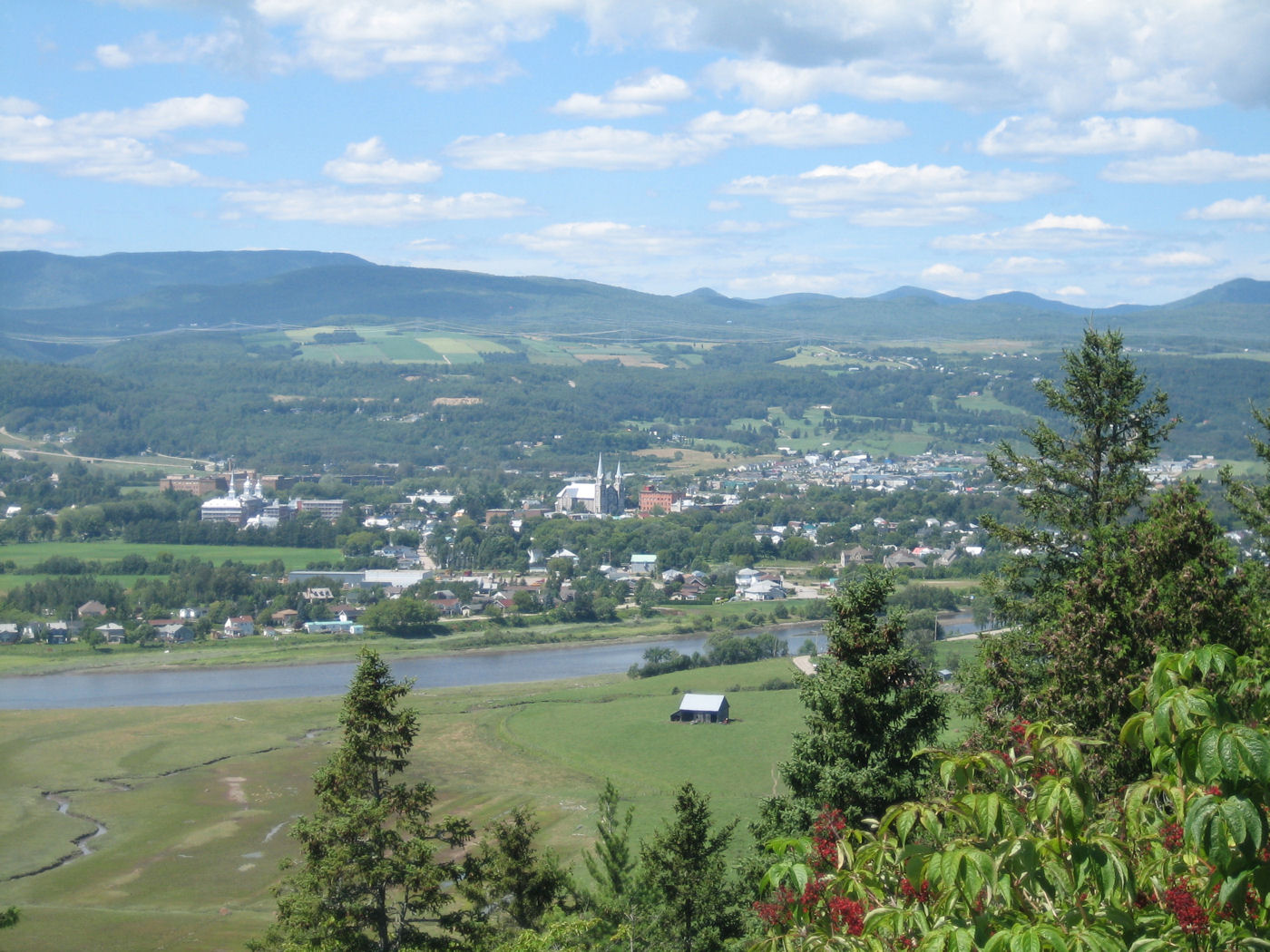
- Looking north across the hills of Charlevoix from Baie-Saint-Paul

- Location within Quebec Location within Canada
- Location: Charlevoix, Quebec, Canada
- Coordinates: 47°32′N 70°18′W
- Area: 65,000 hectares (160,000 acres)
- Created: 1988

The Charlevoix Biosphere Reserve is part of the Man and the Biosphere Programme of the UNESCO. It is managed by the Charlevoix Biosphere Reserve Corporation.

In Canada, the Canadian Commission for UNESCO deals with reservations. In addition, there is also the Canadian Association of Biosphere Reservesé Canada currently has 19 biosphere reserves.

The Charlevoix Biosphere Reserve is one of four Quebec reserves in the UNESCO Canadian biosphere reserve network.

== Territory ==
It covers the territory of the Charlevoix impact structure. It is found in the administrative boundaries of the Capitale-Nationale region and in the MRCs of Charlevoix Regional County Municipality and Charlevoix-Est.

=== Central areas ===
- Hautes-Gorges-de-la-Rivière-Malbaie National Park
- Grands-Jardins National Park
- Saguenay–St. Lawrence Marine Park
- Grands-Ormes Ecological Reserve
- Thomas-Fortin Ecological Reserve
- Laurentides Wildlife Reserve
- Rivière du Gouffre
- Malbaie River
- Unorganized territory of Lac-Pikauba
- Unorganized territory of Mont-Élie
- Unorganized territory of Sagard

=== Buffer zone and cooperation area ===
Here are the municipalities of the Charlevoix region, at the heart of the cooperation area:

- Baie-Saint-Paul
- Baie-Sainte-Catherine
- Clermont
- L'Isle-aux-Coudres
- La Malbaie
- Les Éboulements
- Notre-Dame-des-Monts
- Petite-Rivière-Saint-François
- Saint-Aimé-des-Lacs
- Saint-Hilarion
- Saint-Irénée
- Saint-Siméon
- Saint-Urbain

== See also ==
- Biosphere Reserves of Canada
