= Jacob River (Quebec) =

Jacob River Rivière Jacob

Location
- Country: Canada
- Province: Quebec
- Region: Capitale-Nationale
- Regional County Municipality: Charlevoix-Est Regional County Municipality

Physical characteristics
- Source: Comporté Lake
  - location: Zec du Lac-au-Sable dans unorganized territory of Mont-Élie, Quebec
  - coordinates: 47°41′49″N 70°13′21″W
  - elevation: 443 m (1,453 ft)
- Mouth: Malbaie River
  - location: Clermont
  - coordinates: 47°41′49″N 70°13′24″W
  - elevation: 40 m (130 ft)
- Length: 14.4 km (8.9 mi)
- Discharge
  - location: Clermont

Basin features
- River system: St. Lawrence River Estuary

The Jacob River is a tributary of the north shore of the Malbaie River flowing generally southward successively into zec du Lac-au-Sable into the unorganized territory of Mont-Élie, in the city of La Malbaie and in the city of Clermont at the end of the course, in Charlevoix-Est Regional County Municipality, in Quebec, Canada.

With a difference of 403 m (1,322 ft), the Jacob River flows southerly in a forest zone between the Snigole River (West side) and the Comporté River (East side). After several rounds of rapids, waterfalls and falls in the forest area, the Jacob River flows into the Malbaie River in front of downtown Clermont.

This small forest valley is mostly accessible in its lower part by the Marais road which goes to the North, and in its upper part by a secondary forest road serving the west bank of the river. Forestry is the main economic activity of the sector; recreational tourism activities, second.

The surface of this stream is generally frozen from mid-December to late-March. Nevertheless, safe ice traffic is generally from late December to mid-March.

== Geography ==
The Jacob River has its source at Jacob Lake (length: 0.8 km (0.50 mi), altitude: 443 m (1,453 ft)) located in Zec du Lac-au-Sable. This wild lake is located in a small forest valley (in the north-south axis). This lake is enclosed by mountains with a peak of 800 m (2,600 ft) in the east, 880 m (2,890 ft) in the southwest, and another of 636 m (2,087 ft) to the northwest. A stream on the north shore of this lake drains a small valley. Hydro-Québec high-voltage lines (north-south direction) pass on the west side of the lake.

From the dam at the outlet of Jacob Lake, the current flows southward along the following segments:

- 7.9 km (4.9 mi) to the south in elevation of 182 m (597 ft) crossing several series of rapids and waterfalls, first in the unorganized territory of Mont-Élie then in the territory of the town of La Malbaie, until the first bridge of the Chemin des Marais;
- 1.4 km (0.87 mi) to the south crossing several series of rapids and waterfalls, and entering the territory of Clermont, to the second bridge of the "chemin des Marais";
- 4.1 km (2.5 mi) to the south, crossing several series of rapids and waterfalls, to the Lac des Lacs bridge;
- 1.0 km (0.62 mi) to the south passing through agricultural and industrial territory, and passing under the railway bridge, until its confluence with the Malbaie River.

For regulatory purposes, a low-capacity dam owned by the Government of Quebec was erected on the Jacob River 1.0 km (0.62 mi) upstream of the mouth of the Jacob River. The concrete-gravity type structure with a height of 4.1 m (13 ft) and a length of 20.0 m (65.6 ft) was built in 1938.

The confluence of the Jacob River is located opposite a municipal park in downtown Clermont, at 1.1 km (0.68 mi) downstream of the dam which creates a widening of the Malbaie River and a hundred meters upstream from the railway bridge over the Malbaie River in downtown Clermont.

== Toponymy ==
The term "Jacob" refers to the memory of a former owner of a lot of land around Lake Jacob. According to the Commission de toponymie du Québec, four mills were built and operated along its route: two saw mills, a flour mill and a wool card mill.

The name "Jacob River" was formalized on December 5, 1968 at the Place Names Bank of the Commission de toponymie du Québec.

== See also ==
- Zec du Lac-au-Sable, a controlled harvesting zone
- Mount-Élie, unorganized territory
- Clermont, a municipality
- La Malbaie, a city
- Malbaie River, a watercourse
- List of rivers of Quebec
