= Snigole River =

Snigole River Rivière Snigole
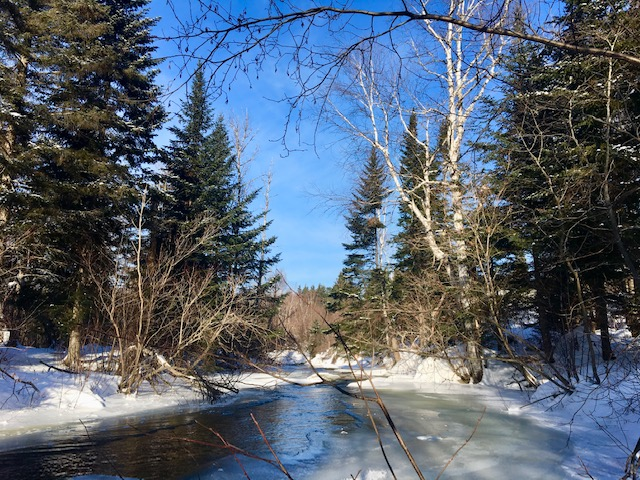
- Course of the River Snigole

Location
- Country: Canada
- Province: Quebec
- Region: Capitale-Nationale
- Regional County Municipality: Charlevoix Regional County Municipality

Physical characteristics
- Source: Deuxième lac des Marais (Second Marsh Lake)
  - location: Mont-Élie in the zec du Lac-au-Sable
  - coordinates: 47.82207°N 70.25974°W
  - elevation: 519 m (1,703 ft)
- Mouth: Malbaie River
  - location: Clermont
  - coordinates: 47°42′30″N 70°14′28″W
  - elevation: 59 m (194 ft)
- Length: 18.7 km (11.6 mi)
- Discharge
  - location: La Malbaie

The Snigole River is a tributary of the north shore of the Malbaie River flowing generally to the south, especially in the zec du Lac-au-Sable in the unorganized territory of Mont-Élie, then in the territory of Clermont at the end of the route, in the Charlevoix-Est Regional County Municipality, in Quebec, Canada.

This river flowing mainly in forest area has a difference in elevation of 460 m (1,510 ft). It flows south between the “ruisseau des Américains” (American Creek) (west side) and the Jacob River (east side). After several rounds of rapids, waterfalls and falls in the forest area, the Snigole River flows into the Malbaie River facing the “montagne de la Croix” (mountain of the cross).

The east bank of this small forest valley is mostly accessible by the “chemin des Marais” (path of the Marshes) which goes to the North. Forestry is the main economic activity of the sector; recreational tourism activities, second.

The surface of this stream is generally frozen from mid-December to late-March. Nevertheless, safe ice traffic is generally from late December to mid-March.

== Geography ==
The Snigole River originates at “Deuxième lac des Marais” (Second Marsh Lake) (length: 1.3 km (0.81 mi), elevation: 519 m (1,703 ft)) located on the southeastern side of Mont-Élie in the zec du Lac-au-Sable. This wild lake is located in a small forest and recessed valley. It is enclosed between mountains with a peak reaching 799 m (2,621 ft) in the east, 930 m (3,050 ft) in the south and another one of 750 m (2,460 ft) at West. This lake is aptly named because of marshes on the northwestern shore of the lake. Four streams from the north-west drain the east flank of Mont-Élie via the valley connecting the “Troisième lac des Marais” (third Marsh Lake) (flowing in the “Petit Saguenay River” watershed) with the north, which is located at 3.4 km (2.1 mi) north of the Second Marsh Lake.

From the mouth of the Second Marsh Lake, the current flows over 18.7 km (11.6 mi) according to the following segments:

- 2.5 km (1.6 mi) southeasterly, crossing the First Lake of the Marshes on the 1.3 km (0.81 mi) to the dam at its mouth;
- 6.6 km (4.1 mi) south through several series of rapids and waterfalls, and branch westward at the end of the segment to get around a mountain, up to a bend in the river, where a stream (coming from the west) flows there;
- 7.0 km (4.3 mi) southeasterly, then southerly, in a well-formed valley through three sets of rapids, to the confluence of the marsh stream (coming from the west);
- 2.6 km (1.6 mi) southeasterly under the “chemin des Marais” (Marsh Road) bridge, then easterly to its confluence with the Malbaie River.

The confluence of the Snigole River is at 1.0 km (0.62 mi) upstream of the dam that results in an enlargement of the Malbaie River and at 2.2 km (1.4 mi) upstream of the railway bridge spanning the Malbaie River in downtown Clermont.

== Toponymy ==
The origin of the term "Snigole" is uncertain. The first hypothesis would be the deformation of the English word "sea gull", meaning "gull"; these domineering birds are usually very present here, except in winter. A second hypothesis is that "Snigole" is similar to the term "Snieguole" meaning "snowman" in the Latvian language. A third hypothesis is that "Snigole" is similar to the term "Smigole" which is a rare name.

The name "Snigole River" was formalized on December 5, 1968, at the Bank of Place Names of the Commission de toponymie du Québec.

== Annexes ==
=== Related Articles ===
- Zec du Lac-au-Sable, a controlled harvested zone
- Mount-Élie, an unorganized territory
- Clermont, a municipality
- Malbaie River, a watercourse
- List of rivers of Quebec
