= Rivière des Martres =

- Location within Quebec

Location
- Country: Canada
- Province: Quebec
- Region: Capitale-Nationale
- Regional County Municipality: Charlevoix and Charlevoix-Est
- Municipalities: Lac-Pikauba and Mont-Élie

Physical characteristics
- Source: Lac des Loutres
  - location: Lac-Pikauba
  - coordinates: 47°42′48″N 70°59′41″W
  - elevation: 596 m (1,955 ft)
- Mouth: Malbaie River
  - location: Mont-Élie
  - coordinates: 47°52′10″N 70°29′12″W
  - elevation: 240 m (790 ft)
- Length: 15.8 km (9.8 mi)

Basin features
- Tributaries
  - left: (Upstreem from the mouth): Discharge from a lake, discharge from a set of lakes including Malfait Lake, discharge from three small lakes, discharge from three lakes, two streams.
  - right: (Upstream from the mouth): Stream, discharge from two lakes; discharge from about fifteen lakes; including Lake Cobra; and Petit lac Long, stream; discharge from the lakes; du Coin and Perdrix; two streams; stream from Érables, two streams; discharge from lakes Rosa; à Jack and the Cross.

The rivière des Martres (English: Martens' River) is a tributary of the west bank of the intermediate part of the Malbaie River, flowing in the administrative region of Capitale-Nationale, in the province from Quebec, in Canada. This watercourse crosses the regional county municipalities of:

- Charlevoix Regional County Municipality: in the unorganized territory of Lac-Pikauba;
- Charlevoix-Est: in the unorganized territory of Mont-Élie.

This watercourse crosses the Hautes-Gorges-de-la-Rivière-Malbaie National Park.

The upper part of this valley is served by a secondary forest road connecting west to the valley of the upper Malbaie river. The lower part does not have roads suitable for motor vehicles due to the mountainous terrain. Recreational and tourist activities constitute the main economic activities in this valley in the park area; forestry, second (in the Laurentides wildlife reserve, the upper part of the valley).

Because of the altitude, the surface of the Martres River is generally frozen from the end of November until the beginning of April; however, safe circulation on the ice is generally from the beginning of December until the end of March. The water level of the river varies with the seasons and the precipitation; the spring flood generally occurs in April.

== Geography ==
The Martres river rises from the Lac de la Loutre (length: 0.7 kilometres (0.43 mi); altitude: 596 metres (1,955 ft)) landlocked between the mountains, located in a forest area in the territory not organized from Lac-Pikauba. The mouth of this small lake is located to the southwest, at:

- 4.6 kilometres (2.9 mi) east of a curve in the upper part of the Malbaie River;
- 1.5 kilometres (0.93 mi) south-east of Moreau Lake;
- 3.8 kilometres (2.4 mi) south-west of Lac au Porc-Épic;
- 14.4 kilometres (8.9 mi) north-west of the MRC limit;
- 52.6 kilometres (32.7 mi) north of downtown Baie-Saint-Paul;
- 12.5 kilometres (7.8 mi) west of the mouth of the Martres river.

From its source, the course of the Martres river descends on 15.8 kilometres (9.8 mi) in an increasingly steep valley with high cliffs, with a drop of 356 metres (1,168 ft), according to the following segments:

- 5.2 kilometres (3.2 mi) to the east in an increasingly deep valley, forming a curve towards the north and entering the Hautes-Gorges-de-la-Rivière national park at the end of the segment (i.e. the last 0.8 kilometres (0.50 mi)), up to the Érables stream coming from the south). Note: the Érables stream drains a set of bodies of water including lakes des Martres, Malfait, Boivin, Boulianne, des Érables and Thomas;
- 4.4 kilometres (2.7 mi) the south-east by collecting the discharge (coming from the north) of an unidentified lake, the discharge (coming from the south) of two small lakes and the discharge (coming from the north) of three small lakes, up to the outlet (coming from the north) of a set of lakes including Lac de la Cuvette and Lac Malfait;
- 1.5 kilometres (0.93 mi) south-east to the limit of the two RCMs where the course curves south to the outlet (coming from the north) of Lac Jean;
- 2.5 kilometres (1.6 mi) first towards the south, bending towards the east to collect two discharges from lakes (one coming from the southwest, the other coming from the south), up to at the outlet (coming from the northwest) of two small lakes;
- 2.2 kilometres (1.4 mi) towards the south-east forms a slight curve towards the south, then curving towards the south-east at the end of the segment, until its mouth.

The Martres river flows in a bend on the west bank of the Malbaie river, in the unorganized territory of Lac-Pikauba, in the Hautes-Gorges-de-la-Rivière-Malbaie National Park. This mouth is located at:

- 1.7 kilometres (1.1 mi) northeast of a mountain peak (altitude: 807 metres (2,648 ft));
- 9.4 kilometres (5.8 mi) south of a bend upstream on the Malbaie River;
- 34.6 kilometres (21.5 mi) north-west of La Malbaie town center.

From the mouth of the Martres river, the current descends 236 metres (774 ft) over 53.8 kilometres (33.4 mi), following the course of the Malbaie river which flows to La Malbaie in the St. Lawrence River.

== Toponymy ==
This toponym has been known since at least the 1920s. It is named after the American marten, carnivorous mammal of the Mustelidae family, whose fur was much sought after. Since the mid-20th century, due to intensive logging and the increase in the acidity rate of lakes, this mammal has become rarer in this sector.

The toponym "Rivière des Martres" was formalized on December 5, 1968, by the Commission de toponymie du Québec.

== See also ==
- Laurentides Wildlife Reserve
- List of rivers of Quebec
