= Rivière à la Cruche =

Rivière à la Cruche (River of the jug)

Location
- Country: Canada
- Province: Quebec
- Region: Capitale-Nationale
- Regional County Municipality: Charlevoix Regional County Municipality
- Unorganized territory: Lac-Pikauba, Quebec

Physical characteristics
- Source: Pimpant Lake
  - location: Lac-Pikauba, Quebec
  - coordinates: 47.94891°N 70.80503°W
  - elevation: 979 m (3,212 ft)
- Mouth: Malbaie River
  - location: Lac-Pikauba, Quebec
  - coordinates: 47.89°N 70.75222°W
  - elevation: 672 m (2,205 ft)
- Length: 9.9 km (6.2 mi)
- Discharge
  - location: Lac-Pikauba, Quebec

Basin features
- Tributaries
  - left: Discharge of "Petit lac à la Cruche".
  - right: (from the mouth) Ruisseau de montagne, discharge of "lac à la Cruche", mountain creek, mountain creek, discharge of lac Myel.

The rivière à la Cruche (river of the jug) is a tributary of the Malbaie River, flowing into the Lac-Pikauba unorganized territory, into the Regional County Municipality (MRC) of Charlevoix Regional County Municipality, in the Capitale-Nationale administrative region, in the province of Quebec, in Canada. Most of the "rivière à la Cruche" flows to the eastern end of the Laurentides Wildlife Reserve except for the lower part of its course.

The hydrographic slope of "rivière à la Cruche" is served primarily by route 381 (north–south direction) which goes up this valley. It is also served by various secondary forest roads for forestry and recreational tourism purposes.

Forestry is the main economic activity of the sector; recreational tourism activities, second.

The "rivière à la Cruche" area is usually frozen from early December to late March, however, safe ice circulation is generally from mid-December to mid-March.

== Geography ==
The mouth of La Cruche River is located between the Grands-Jardins National Park and Hautes-Gorges-de-la-Rivière-Malbaie National Park; between Ha! Ha! Lake and the Lac des Martres.

The main hydrographic slopes near the "rivière à la Cruche" are:

- North side: Malbaie River, Small Ha! Ha! Lake, Ha! Ha! Lake, Ha! Ha! River;
- east side: Belle Truite Lake, Cran Rouge Creek, Malbaie River, Porc-Épic River, Moreau Lake, Martres River;
- south side: La Cruche Lake, Chenard Lake, Cows Creek, Ha! Ha! River;
- west side: Ha! Ha! River, Myel Lake, Cinto Lake, Goéland Creek, Rivière à Mars Nord.

La Cruche River rises at the mouth of Pimpant Lake (length: 0.17 km (0.11 mi); altitude: 979 m (3,212 ft)) in the southwest corner of the township of Lalemant. The mouth of this lake is located at:

- 2.1 km (1.3 mi) northeast of the Ha! Ha! River;
- 1.9 km (1.2 mi) southwest of Michta Lake;
- 3.0 km (1.9 mi) west of Belle Truite Lake;
- 6.2 km (3.9 mi) south of Little Ha! Ha! Lake;
- 7.3 km (4.5 mi) northwest of "La Cruche Lake";
- 7.6 km (4.7 mi) northwest of the confluence of the "rivière à la Cruche" and the Malbaie River.

From its source (Pimpant Lake), the Cruche river descends on 9.9 km (6.2 mi) in forested and mountainous areas, with a difference of 307 m (1,007 ft) according to the following segments:

- 3.2 km (2.0 mi) easterly curving southeast to the outlet (coming from the west) of Lake Myel;
- 3.4 km (2.1 mi) southeasterly by collecting a stream (from the northwest) to the outlet (coming from the northeast) of the Petit lac à la Cruche;
- 0.7 km (0.43 mi) southeasterly to a creek (coming from the northwest);
- 1.4 km (0.87 mi) southeasterly to the outlet (coming from the south) of La Cruche Lake;
- 1.2 km (0.75 mi) easterly forming a curve to the south, to its mouth.

The "rivière à la Cruche" flows into a swirl zone on the west bank of the Malbaie River. This confluence is located at:

- 0.7 km (0.43 mi) downstream of the mouth of the Porc-Epic River;
- 2.0 km (1.2 mi) northeast of the mouth of La Cruche Lake;
- 7.0 km (4.3 mi) northeast of the Ha! Ha! River;
- 8.4 km (5.2 mi) west of lac des Martres;
- 12.2 km (7.6 mi) southeast of Little Ha! Ha! Lake;
- 45.2 km (28.1 mi) west of downtown Clermont;
- 52.0 km (32.3 mi) west of the confluence of the Malbaie River and the St. Lawrence River.

From the confluence of the La Cruche River, the current flows down the Malbaie River over 98.9 km (61.5 mi) to the northeast, south, and south-east, which flows on the northwestern shore of the St. Lawrence River.

== Toponymy ==
The toponym "Rivière à la Cruche" is indicated on the draft "Lac des Martres", 1961-09-25, item 84. This name was approved on 1963-07-03 by the Quebec Geography Commission.

The toponym "Cruche River" was formalized on December 5, 1968, at the Bank of Place Names of the Commission de toponymie du Quebec.

== See also ==
- Charlevoix, a MRC
- Lac-Pikauba, Quebec, an unorganized territory
- La Malbaie, a municipality
- Laurentides Wildlife Reserve
- Grands-Jardins National Park
- Hautes-Gorges-de-la-Rivière-Malbaie National Park
- Malbaie River
- St. Lawrence River
- List of rivers of Quebec
