= Comporté River =

Comporté River Rivière du Grand Fonds
- Native name: Rivière Comporté (French)

Location
- Country: Canada
- Province: Quebec
- Region: Capitale-Nationale
- Regional County Municipality: Charlevoix Regional County Municipality

Physical characteristics
- Source: Comporté Lake
  - location: La Malbaie
  - coordinates: 47.777°N 71.087422°W
  - elevation: 499 m (1,637 ft)
- Mouth: Malbaie River
  - location: La Malbaie
  - coordinates: 47°48′02″N 70°07′15″W
  - elevation: 10 m (33 ft)
- Length: 15 km (9.3 mi)
- Discharge
  - location: La Malbaie

Basin features
- Tributaries
  - left: Discharge of Bon Repos Lake, discharge of Gravel Lake.

The Comporté River is a tributary of the Malbaie River flowing generally southward into the territory of the town of La Malbaie in the Eastern part of the Charlevoix Regional County Municipality, in Quebec, in Canada. This river has a gap in elevation of 489 m (1,604 ft). After several series of rapids, waterfalls and falls in forest area, it flows into the Malbaie River between the village of Clermont and the town of La Malbaie.

The small valley of the Comporté River is served primarily on the west side of the river by Fraser Falls Road (west side of the river), and on the east side by Rang Sainte-Julie Road, "chemin des loisirs" and the Road Grands-Fonds. Great-Walls, and some other secondary forest roads, for forestry and recreation purposes. Some trails lead north into the Zec du Lac-au-Sable up to "Lac au Plongeon".

Forestry is the main economic activity of the sector, followed by recreational tourism activities.

The surface of this stream is generally frozen from mid-December to late-March. Nevertheless, safe ice traffic is generally from late December to mid-March.

== Geography ==
The Comporté River originates from Comporté Lake (length: 1.3 km (0.81 mi), altitude: 499 m (1,637 ft)) located on the north hydrographic slope of the Malbaie River. This lake of the "Outfitter de la Comporté" is located in a forest area in a small valley of mountains.

Course of the Comporté River

From its source, the Comporté River runs on 20.8 km (12.9 mi) according to the following segments:

- 5.4 km (3.4 mi) southeasterly, winding up to the Grand-Fonds Road road bridge;
- 2.9 km (1.8 mi) south along the Chemin des Loisirs and past the Mont-Grand-Fonds to the road bridge at chemin de Grand-Fonds;
- 5.0 km (3.1 mi) south along the Chemin des Loisirs in an area with several houses or cottages, the village Grand-Fonds, then crossing two sets of rapids, to the dump (coming from the east) of Gravel Lake;
- 7.5 km (4.7 mi) south through several rounds of rapids or waterfalls, past Butte-à-Julie, crossing a dam, crossing Fraser Falls, skirting a campsite by the side west, passing under Hydro-Québec's high-voltage towers; then by cutting the Chemin de la Vallée and crossing a small municipal park until its confluence with the Malbaie River.

The Comporté River flows on the north shore of the Malbaie River, in the town of la Malbaie, facing route 138. This confluence is located upstream of a curve of the Malbaie River and a west bank campground.

== Toponymy ==
The term "Comporté" evokes the merit of Lieutenant Philippe Gaultier de Comporté (1641-1687) of the Carignan-Salières Regiment arrived at Quebec in 1665. He was military, lord, commissioner of the stores of the king, provost of the Maréchaussée, commissioner of the marine, born in 1641 in Comporté, near Poitiers, Philippe Gaultier, sieur of Rinault, and Gillette de Vernon, deceased in Quebec in 1687 and buried in the same place on November 22.

The toponym "Comporté River" was formalized on December 5, 1968, at the Bank of Place Names of the Commission de toponymie du Québec.

== See also ==
- Philippe Gaultier de Comporté, military
- Charlevoix-Est Regional County Municipality
- La Malbaie, a municipality
- Malbaie River, a watercourse
- List of rivers of Quebec
