= Mailloux River =

River in Charlevoix-Est Regional County Municipality, Quebec, Canada

- Location within Quebec

Location
- Country: Canada
- Province: Quebec
- Region: Capitale-Nationale
- Regional County Municipality: Charlevoix-Est Regional County Municipality
- Municipality: La Malbaie

Physical characteristics
- Source: Little unidentified lake
  - location: La Malbaie
  - coordinates: 47°39′10″N 70°15′13″W
  - elevation: 369 m
- Mouth: Saint Lawrence River
  - location: La Malbaie
  - coordinates: 47°38′48″N 70°09′04″W
  - elevation: 3 m
- Length: 9.5 km (5.9 mi)

Basin features
- Tributaries
  - left: (Upward from the mouth) Discharge from an unidentified small lake, discharge from an unidentified small lake.
  - right: (Upward from the mouth) Three unidentified streams, outlet of Calumet Lake, three unidentified streams.

The Mailloux River is a tributary of the north shore of the St. Lawrence River, in the municipality of La Malbaie, in the Charlevoix-Est Regional County Municipality, in the administrative region of Capitale-Nationale, in the province of Quebec, in Canada.

The southern part of this small valley is accessible by the Chemin du Golf and the Boulevard de Comporté which runs along the south of the river, as well as by the Chemin du rang Saint-Charles. The main economic activities in this valley are linked to the urban economy and particularly to tourist accommodation. Agriculture and forestry characterize the upper part of this valley.

The surface of the Mailloux River is generally frozen from the beginning of December until the end of March; however, safe traffic on the ice is generally from mid-December to mid-March. The water level of the river varies with the seasons and the precipitation; the spring flood occurs in March or April.

== Geography ==
The Mailloux river takes its source from a small forest lake located on the northeast side of rang Saint-Joseph road, in agricultural and forestry areas. This small lake is located at:

- 0.9 kilometres (0.56 mi) northwest of the top of a mountain (altitude: 460 metres (1,510 ft));
- 1.6 kilometres (0.99 mi) south-east of the village center of Sainte-Agnès;
- 3.2 kilometres (2.0 mi) south-east of route 138;
- 4.9 kilometres (3.0 mi) south of downtown Clermont;
- 7.9 kilometres (4.9 mi) west of La Malbaie on the northwest bank of the St. Lawrence River.

From this source, the course of the Mailloux river descends on 9.5 kilometres (5.9 mi), with a drop of 366 metres (1,201 ft), according to the following segments:

- 3.1 kilometres (1.9 mi) north-east in the forest zone, bending east to cross an agricultural zone, up to chemin du rang Saint-Charles;
- 12 kilometres (7.5 mi) north-east in an agricultural and forestry area, to a stream (coming from the west);
- 5.2 kilometres (3.2 mi) to the east along Chemin Mailloux, collecting two streams (coming from the southwest) and one stream (coming from the west), passing on the north side of the center of hamlet Rivière-Mailloux and crossing route 362 (boulevard de Comporté) at the end of the segment, until its mouth.

The Mailloux river flows on the west bank of La Malbaie located on the northwest bank of the Saint-Laurent river, in the heart of the village of La Malbaie. This mouth is located at:

- 1.35 kilometres (0.84 mi) south-east of the bridge spanning the Malbaie River in downtown La Malbaie;
- 1.8 kilometres (1.1 mi) north-west of the center of the hamlet of Pointe-au-Pic;
- 2.9 kilometres (1.8 mi) north-west of Manoir Richelieu.

== Toponymy ==
The term "Mailloux" constitutes a family name of French origin.

The toponym "rivière Mailloux" was formalized on December 5, 1968 at the Place Names Bank of the Commission de toponymie du Québec.

== Appendices ==
=== Related articles ===
- Charlevoix-Est Regional County Municipality
- La Malbaie, a city
- St. Lawrence River
- Malbaie River
- List of rivers of Quebec
