= Porc-Épic River =

Rivière Porc-Épic

Location
- Country: Canada
- Province: Quebec
- Region: Capitale-Nationale
- Regional County Municipality: Charlevoix Regional County Municipality
- Unorganized territory: Lac-Pikauba, Quebec

Physical characteristics
- Source: Lac de la Hache
  - location: Lac-Pikauba
  - coordinates: 47.84017°N 70.7248°W
  - elevation: 839 m (2,753 ft)
- Mouth: Malbaie River
  - location: Lac-Pikauba
  - coordinates: 47.89555°N 70.73861°W
  - elevation: 712 m (2,336 ft)
- Length: 9.2 km (5.7 mi)
- Discharge
  - location: Lac-Pikauba

Basin features
- Tributaries
  - right: (from the mouth) discharge of Michta Lake, discharge of "lac de la Flèche", discharge of "lac de la Mésange", discharge of Beaulieu Lake.

The Porc-Épic River is a tributary of the Malbaie River, flowing into the unorganized territory of Lac-Pikauba, in Charlevoix Regional County Municipality, in the Capitale-Nationale administrative region, in the province of Quebec, in Canada. Most of the Porc-Épic River flows into the territory of the Zec des Martres, except for the last 1.6 km (0.99 mi) before reaching its mouth.

The hydrographic slope of the Porc-Épic River is served mainly by a secondary forest road that goes up this valley for forestry and recreational tourism purposes.

Forestry is the main economic activity of the sector; recreational tourism activities, second.

The surface of the Porc-Épic River is usually frozen from early December to late March, however, safe ice movement is generally from mid-December to mid-March.

== Geography ==
The mouth of the Porc-Épic River is located between the territories of the Grands-Jardins National Park and Hautes-Gorges-de-la-Rivière-Malbaie National Park; between Ha! Ha! Lake and the Lac des Martres.

The main hydrographic slopes near the Porc-Épic River are:

- north side: Malbaie River, Cran Rouge Creek, Moreau Lake, Des Martres River;
- east side: Beaulieu Lake, Lac des Martres, Barley Lake, Rivière du Gouffre;
- south side: Cold Creek, Hache Lake, Coq Lake, Barley River, Malbaie River;
- west side: Malbaie River, La Cruche Lake, La Cruche River, Ha! Ha! River.

The Porc-Épic River originates at the mouth of Lac de la Hache (length: 0.7 km (0.43 mi); altitude: 712 m (2,336 ft)). The mouth of this lake is located at:

- 3.1 km (1.9 mi) west of a bay of Lac des Martres;
- 3.7 km (2.3 mi) east of a curve of the Malbaie River;
- 3.7 km (2.3 mi) northeast of the Barley [river];
- 7.8 km (4.8 mi) south-west of Beaulieu Lake;
- 7.8 km (4.8 mi) northwest of Little Malbaie Lake, head lake of the Little Malbaie River;
- 10.2 km (6.3 mi) south-west of a curve of the upper course of the Rivière du Gouffre;
- 6.6 km (4.1 mi) south-east of the confluence of the Porc-Épic River and the Malbaie River.

From its source (Pimpant Lake), the Porc-Épic River descends on 9.2 km (5.7 mi) entirely in forested and mountainous zones, with a difference of 127 m (417 ft) according to the following segments:

- 1.5 km (0.93 mi) northerly crossing an unidentified lake (length: 0.6 km (0.37 mi); altitude: 933 km (580 mi)) surrounded by marshes, up to the discharge (coming from the east) of Beaulieu Lake;
- 2.7 km (1.7 mi) in a steep valley, first to the north, curving east, then north again, collecting a stream (from the northwest), a stream (coming from the northeast);
- 1.5 km (0.93 mi) to the northwest forming two small hooks, to the discharge (from the east) of the lake of the titmouse;
- 2.5 km (1.6 mi) northwesterly to the outlet (from the north) of an unidentified lake enclosed by mountains;
- 1.0 km (0.62 mi) westerly in a steep valley to its mouth.

The Porc-Épic River flows into a swirl zone on the west bank of the Malbaie River. This confluence is located at:

- 0.7 km (0.43 mi) upstream of the mouth of the La Cruche River;
- 3.2 km (2.0 mi) northeast of the mouth of La Cruche Lake;
- 8.2 km (5.1 mi) east of the Ha! Ha! River;
- 7.9 km (4.9 mi) north-west of lac des Martres;
- 11.8 km (7.3 mi) southeast of Little Ha! Ha! Lake;
- 51.2 km (31.8 mi) west of the confluence of the Malbaie River and the St. Lawrence River.

From the confluence of the Porc-Épic River, the current flows down the Malbaie River to 91.1 km (56.6 mi) east, then south-east, which flows over the northwest shore of the St. Lawrence River.

== Toponymy ==
The name "Porc-Épic River" appears in the Dictionary of Rivers and Lakes of the province of Quebec, 1925, page 141. This name was approved on 1963-07-03 by the Commission de géographie du Québec.

The toponym "Porc-Épic River" was formalized on December 5, 1968, at the Bank of Place Names of the Commission de toponymie du Quebec.

== See also ==
- La Malbaie, a city
- List of rivers of Quebec
