= Chemin des Canots River =

Tributary of Saguenay, Quebec, Canada

Chemin des canots River
- Location within Quebec

Location
- Country: Canada
- Province: Quebec
- Region: Capitale-Nationale
- Regional County Municipality: Charlevoix Regional County Municipality
- Unorganised territory: Lac-Pikauba

Physical characteristics
- Source: Mountain creek
  - location: Lac-Pikauba
  - coordinates: 47.84760°N 70.87681°W
  - elevation: 925 m (3,035 ft)
- Mouth: Malbaie River
  - location: Lac-Pikauba
  - coordinates: 47.765°N 70.79861°W
  - elevation: 640 m (2,100 ft)
- Length: 20.8 km (12.9 mi)
- Discharge
  - location: Lac-Pikauba

Basin features
- River system: St. Lawrence River
- Tributaries
  - left: (from the mouth) Discharge of "l’Étang aux Maringouins", discharge of "lac du Creux" and of "lac de la Panetière".
  - right: (from the mouth) Discharge of "lac de la jeune Loutre", discharge of "lac Bondy", discharge of "Petit lac Drolet", discharge of a set of lakes (Raymond, des Vents, des Oréades, des Tétras, Liette, des Fagots et Hallebarde), discharge of lakes Sandra and "des Bousiers", discharge of a set of lakes (Bazot, Bazet, Issor et Harpin), discharge of a set of lakes (Gautreau, Mafflu, du Ponceau, Trique et des Nuages), discharge of lac Vivet.

The Chemin des Canots River (rivière du Chemin des canots) is a tributary of the Malbaie River, flowing into the unorganized territory of Lac-Pikauba in the Charlevoix Regional County Municipality, in the Capitale-Nationale administrative region, in the province of Quebec, in Canada. The Chemin des Canots River crosses the eastern part of the Laurentides Wildlife Reserve; it flows into a river bend on the southwestern bank of the Malbaie River facing the zec des Martres.

The lower and middle parts of the Chemin des Canots River valley are served primarily by R0360 forest road and some other secondary forest roads, for forestry and recreational tourism purposes.

Forestry is the main economic activity of the sector; recreational tourism activities, second.

The surface of the Chemin des Canots River is usually frozen from early December to late March, however, safe ice circulation is generally from mid-December to mid-March.

== Geography ==
The middle section of Chemin des Canots River has a series of nine lakes aligned from north to south on 8.4 km (5.2 mi) between Lac Duquette and Lac Robitaille. Canoeing can be practiced on this river for about ten kilometers; however, this river segment has only one portage to bypass the rapids between Lake Layrac and Canoe Lake. A canoe trip or by air can admire the summits of surrounding mountains named according to the main summits of the International Organization of the Francophonie:

- east side of the river: Moncton summit (1,015 m (3,330 ft)), from Hanoi (1,015 m (3,330 ft)), from Dakar (1,017 m (3,337 ft)), of Cotonou (961 m (3,153 ft)), of Paris (972 m (3,189 ft)), of Quebec (968 m (3,176 ft));
- west side of the river: summit of Mauritius (899 m (2,949 ft)) and Chaillot (1,017 m (3,337 ft)).

The main hydrographic slopes near the Chemin des Canots River are:

- north side: Creek des Vaches, Malbaie River, Froid Creek, Barley River, Ménard Lake, rivière à la Cruche;
- east side: Malbaie River, Barley River, Little Malbaie River;
- south side: Boisvert Lake, Enfers Lake, Hell River, Malbaie River;
- West side: Vents Lake, Raymond Lake, Hallebarde Lake, River at Mars.

The Canots River River rises at the mouth of a mountain stream (elevation: 925 m (3,035 ft)) at:

- 1.4 km (0.87 mi) northeast of Stymphale Lake;
- 3.1 km (1.9 mi) north-east of a curve of the course of the river at Mars;
- 7.5 km (4.7 mi) west of the Malbaie River;
- 8.1 km (5.0 mi) southeast of Cinto Lake;
- 10.9 km (6.8 mi) northwest of the confluence of the Rivière des Canots and Rivière Malbaie.

From its source (Pimpant Lake), the Chemin des Canots River descends on 20.8 km (12.9 mi) entirely in forest and mountainous areas, with a difference of 285 m (935 ft) depending on the segments following:

- 2.9 km (1.8 mi) northeasterly down the mountain, then southeast, to a river bend corresponding to a creek (coming from the north);
- 3.4 km (2.1 mi) southeasterly into a steep valley, passing between two mountains whose summit reaches 1,025 m (3,363 ft) on the east side (the "Moncton Summit") and 1,065 km (662 mi) on the west side, as well as crossing Lake Duquette (length: 0.5 km (0.31 mi); altitude: 748 m (2,454 ft)) to its mouth;
- 4.0 km (2.5 mi) to the south, crossing two lakes in succession: Bernard lake (length: 1.5 km (0.93 mi); altitude: 748 m (0.465 mi)) on 1.1 km (0.68 mi) and Assigny Lake (length: 1.4 km (0.87 mi); altitude: 742 m (2,434 ft)) on its full length, to the mouth of the latter. Note: Lake Bernard receives on the west side the waters of a group of lakes, including Gautreau Lake;
- 1.9 km (1.2 mi) to the south by collecting the dump (coming from the east) of Creux Lake and Lac de la Panetière, by cutting the forest road R0360, crossing Lake Layrac (length: 0.6 km (0.37 mi); altitude: 741 m (2,431 ft)) on its full length and crossing Canoe Lake (length: 0.4 km (0.25 mi); altitude: 735 m (2,411 ft)), to its mouth. Note: Lake Canoes receives the discharge (from the east) of a set of lakes (Liette, Fagots, Grouse, Oread, Raymond, Wind and Halberd);
- 8.6 km (5.3 mi) north-east across Lake Robitaille (elevation: 733 m (2,405 ft)), collecting the dump (coming from the south) of Bondy Lake and the dump ( from the south) of the Jeune Otter lake, to its mouth.

The Chemin des Canots River flows on the west bank of the Malbaie River downstream of a river curve and a rapids area. This confluence is located at:

- 4.2 km (2.6 mi) east of Assigny Lake which is part of the lake chain supplying the Chemin des Canots River;
- 5.1 km (3.2 mi) northwest of the confluence of Little Malbaie River and Malbaie River;
- 6.1 km (3.8 mi) west of Petite Malbaie River;
- 13.0 km (8.1 mi) south-west of lac des Martres;
- 50.2 km (31.2 mi) southwest of the confluence of the Malbaie River and the St. Lawrence River.

From the confluence of the Chemin des Canots River, the current flows down the course of the Malbaie River on 117.1 km (72.8 mi) to the northeast, south and south-east, which empties on the northwest shore of the St. Lawrence River.

== See also ==
- Charlevoix Regional County Municipality
- Lac-Pikauba, a TNO
- Laurentides Wildlife Reserve
- Zec des Martres, a controlled harvesting zone
- Malbaie River
- St. Lawrence River
- List of rivers of Quebec
