= Comporté =

Comporté may refer to:

== People with the surname ==
- Philippe Gaultier de Comporté (1641-1687), lieutenant of the Carignan-Salières Regiment that arrived at the city of Quebec in 1665

== Toponyms ==
- Comporté, a locality, near Poitiers, in the Center-West of France
- Pourvoirie de Comporté (Outfitter de Comporté), an outfitter located north of the town of La Malbaie, on the edge of Lake Comporté
- Comporté River, a tributary of the Malbaie River flowing into La Malbaie in the Eastern part of Charlevoix Regional County Municipality, Quebec, Canada
- Seigneurie Comporté, seigneury in Quebec, Canada
