= Charlevoix County =

Charlevoix County may refer to:

- Charlevoix County, Michigan, a county in Michigan
- Charlevoix-Est Regional County Municipality, a regional county municipality in Quebec
- Charlevoix Regional County Municipality, a regional county municipality in Quebec
