= Zec du Lac-au-Sable =

- Location within Quebec
- Location: Canada, Quebec, Charlevoix-Est Regional County Municipality
- Nearest city: Clermont (Charlevoix-Est), La Malbaie
- Coordinates: 47°52′N 70°15′W
- Area: 370 square kilometres (140 sq mi)
- Established: 1978
- Governing body: Association loisirs et plein air des Marais inc

Zec du Lac-au-Sable is a "zone d'exploitation contrôlée" (controlled harvesting zone) (zec) located in the unorganized territory of Mont-Élie, in Charlevoix-Est Regional County Municipality, in administrative region of Capitale-Nationale, Quebec, Canada.

== Geography ==
"ZEC du Lac au Sable" is connected (on its western side) to the "zec des Martres" and at north to the "zec de l'Anse-Saint-Jean". "Zec du Lac au Sable" is 51 kilometres (32 mi) long (north-south axis) and 32 kilometres (20 mi) in width from east to west. The relief of the "Zec du Lac au Sable" is typical of the Charlevoix region. The ground elevation varies from 150 metres (490 ft) to over 1,000 metres (3,300 ft).

Major lakes of the zec are: "au Bouleau" (Birch), Boulianne, des Caleçons, Cimon, Couture, Emmuraillé, de la Glissette, de l'Étoile (of the star), "de l'Hermine", des Panses, des Roches, du Garde, du Sauvage, du Tétras (Grouse), lac à l'Est, lac à Jacob, Julie, Lapointe, Moïse, "lac à l'Orignal", Pierrot, Pilotte, Raymond, au Sable, "petit lac au Sable", "Premier lac des Marais", "Deuxième lac des Marais" and "Troisième lac des Marais".

The main rivers of the ZEC are: "La Malbaie", "rivière Petit Saguenay", Jacob, "des Marais", "ruisseaux des Castors" (Beavers creeks), "des Américains", Chouinard, "du Pont" and "la rivière Snigol".

In the area of the zec, the road network is composed exclusively of gravel roads in forested areas. Depending on the period, logging entreprises carry the cut wood using forested roads in the zec territory.

Zec offers a service of boat rental for several lakes. Many water bodies are equipped with boat ramp. The zec also offers various hosting services at:

- "Chalet Donohue" at "Second Marsh Lake", 15 kilometres (9.3 mi) road drive from the entrance station,
- "Yourte à Menaud", at "Lake in the east",
- "Camping de la Gélinotte" (camping of the grouse).

The route to reach the reception office (located at the southernmost part of the ZEC), starting from Clermont, in Charlevoix: take the street des Érables (Maples street) to the bridge on Donohue street. Turn left (on Donohue street), get in the way of the old mills (on the east side of the Malbaie River). At the end turn in the path of Lakes. The entrance station is about 2.4 kilometres (1.5 mi).

== Hunting and fishing ==
"Zec du Lac au Sable" has many suitable lakes for recreative fishing. The zec applies a seeding plan approved by the Minister responsible for wildlife. This evolutionarily describes a list of water bodies where seeding is generally permitted. At certain times of the year, some lakes are subject to special regulations. The brook trout is subject to fishing quotas. In winter, the zec offers activities of ice fishing on few lakes like: "lac de la Glisette", lac Julie and "premier lac des Marais". These lakes are accessible by snowmobiles over a distance of 14–20 km from the entrance station of the zec.

The hunting rules are based on the periods of the season, sex of the beasts (moose) and hunting gear for the following species: moose, american black bear, grouse, hare and pheasant.

== History ==
"ZEC du Lac-au-Sable" was established in 1978 as part of new development policies of provincial government for a better access to some controlled timberlands areas. Then, the zone d'exploitation contrôlée (controlled harvesting zone) (ZEC) were substituting many private clubs. At that time, the "Club des Marais inc" and le "Club Rodrigue inc" were already well established in the center of the current territory of the zec. The membership of these clubs was primarily composed of dozens of employees of Donohue, today Résolu. On January 31, 1978, under the worker's union of Clermont paper company, members of both clubs agree to apply for accreditation to administer the territory for now the "Zec du Lac-au-Sable". On April 26, 1978, at a first formal meeting, the two groups agree on forming an interim committee named "Association loisirs et plein air des Marais" (Association recreation and outdoor of Swamps) and was initially registered on April 24, 1978 at the "Registre des entreprises du Québec" (Registrar of enterprises of Quebec) (amendment to registration on February 2, 1995). The first season took place in the governance of this interim committee until the first general meeting. Today, the zec is part of the provincial network of zec, grouped in the Quebec Federation of Managers of zec (FQGZ).

== Toponymy ==
The origine of zec's name is directly link to "Lac au Sable" (Sand lake) located in northern part of the zec, and at south of "Lac au Bouleau" (Birch Lake).

The toponym "Zec du Lac-au-Sable" was officialized on August 5, 1982, at the Banque of place names at Commission de toponymie du Québec (Geographical Names Board of Quebec).

== See also ==
- Mont-Élie, unorganized territory
- Charlevoix-Est Regional County Municipality
- Capitale-Nationale, administrative region in Québec
- Zec des Martres, neighbor zec on West side
- Zec de l'Anse-Saint-Jean, neighbor zec on North side
- Malbaie River
- Hautes-Gorges-de-la-Rivière-Malbaie National Park
- Zone d'exploitation contrôlée (controlled harvesting zone) (zec)
