= Grands-Ormes Ecological Reserve =

Coordinates: 47.875°N 70.4569°W

- IUCN category Ia (strict nature reserve)
- Interactive map of Grands-Ormes Ecological Reserve
- Location: Mont-Élie, Charlevoix-Est Regional County Municipality, Québec, Canada
- Established: 1994

Grands-Ormes Ecological Reserve (French: Réserve écologique des Grands-Ormes, pronounced [ʁezɛʁv ekɔlɔʒik de ɡʁɑ̃z‿ɔʁm]) is an ecological reserve of Quebec, Canada. It was established in 1994. The reserve is enclosed by Hautes-Gorges-de-la-Rivière-Malbaie National Park.
