= Lac des Martres (Lac-Pikauba) =

Lake in Lac-Pikauba, Quebec, Canada

- Location in Quebec
- Location: Lac-Pikauba
- Coordinates: 47.83667°N 70.63805°W
- Lake type: Natural
- Primary inflows: Four discharges of unidentified lakes, discharge of lac Robbé.
- Primary outflows: Ruisseau des Érables
- Basin countries: Canada
- Max. length: 6.4 km (4.0 mi)
- Max. width: 1.3 km (0.81 mi)
- Surface elevation: 809 m (2,654 ft)

The lac aux Martres is a body of water on the hydrographic side of the rivières des Martres and the Saguenay River via a succession of lakes and ruisseau des Érables. It is located in the unorganized territory of Lac-Pikauba, in the Charlevoix Regional County Municipality, in the administrative region of Capitale-Nationale, in the province of Quebec, in Canada.

The southern part of Lac aux Martres is served indirectly by the Route 381 (north–south direction) which runs along the eastern limit of the Laurentides Wildlife Reserve. Several other secondary forest roads serve the lake sector for forestry and recreational tourism activities.

Forestry is the main economic activity in the sector; recreational tourism, second.

The surface of Lac aux Martres is usually frozen from the end of November to the beginning of April, however the safe circulation on the ice is generally done from mid-December to the end of March.

== Geography ==
Lac des Martres is located between the territory of Hautes-Gorges-de-la-Rivière-Malbaie and that of Grands-Jardins National Park. The main hydrographic slopes neighboring Lac aux Martres are:

- north side: Freddo lake, Second Paul lake, Érables lake, Croix lake, Porc-Épic Lake, Carabine stream;
- east side: rivière du Gouffre, Malbaie River, Petit lac Malfait, Lac du Coeur;
- south side: Barley Lake, Petit Malbaie Lake, Écluse Lake, Rivière du Gouffre;
- west side: Saguenay River, Baie des Ha! Ha!.

Lac aux Martres has a length of 6.4 km (4.0 mi) in the shape of a boat anchor, a maximum width of 1.3 km (0.81 mi), an altitude is 809 m (2,654 ft) and an area of .

Lac aux Martres has a relatively round peninsula with a maximum diameter of 1.5 km (0.93 mi) and with a mountain peak reaching 940 m (3,080 ft). A dam is built at its mouth which is located on the east bank, at:

- 1.6 km (0.99 mi) south-west of the dam at the mouth of Lac Malfait;
- 6.5 km (4.0 mi) south of the confluence of ruisseau des Érables and rivière des martres;
- 10.9 km (6.8 mi) south-west of the confluence of the rivière des martres and the Malbaie River;
- 40.7 km (25.3 mi) east of the confluence of the Malbaie River and the Saint Lawrence estuary.

From the mouth of Lac aux Martres, the current descends the ruisseau des Érables for 4 km (2.5 mi) to the northeast, then the northwest, to "Anse aux Cailles" on the south shore of the Saguenay River; then the current descends to the east the Saguenay River on 93.1 km (57.8 mi) to Tadoussac where the latter river flows into the St. Lawrence River.

== Toponymy ==
The toponym “Lac des Martres” is indicated in the Dictionary of rivers and lakes of the province of Quebec, by Eugène Rouillard, Department of Lands and Forests, 1914, page 270. This work indicates that the land surveyor, F Vincent, in 1886, described it as being located in mountainous terrain, surrounded by fir and spruce; it also notes the presence of trout in its waters. This name evokes the presence of the Canada marten, carnivorous mammal also called fisher, whose fur has long adorned the collars of coats.

The toponym "Lac aux Martres" was formalized on December 5, 1968, by the Commission de toponymie du Québec.

=== See also ===
- Rivière aux Martres
