= Philippe Gaultier de Comporté =

French soldier (1641–1687)

- Occupations: soldier and lord

Philippe Gaultier de Comporté (1641-1687) performed the roles of French soldier in France and in the French colony in New France in the Carignan-Salières Regiment, of attendant (appointed in 1970 by the intendant of Boutroue) to the receipts of the right raised on the goods arriving at the country, of personal prosecutor of the intendant Jean Talon, of lord (lordship Comporté and La Malbaie), commissioner of the king's stores (1672-1678), commissioner of the navy (in 1685 provisionally) and provost of the Maréchaussée (1677).

Born into a noble family, Philippe Gaultier (son of Philippe Gaultier, sieur of Rinault, and Gillette de Vernon) was born in 1641 in Comporté, near Poitiers, in France. He died in Quebec in 1687 and was buried on November 22.

== His life in France ==
On May 10, 1665, a court of justice of Poitou condemned Philippe Gaultier capital punishment by contumance; this judicial case concerns the death of two people who died as a result of a brawl in which he had taken part. The fight was aimed at avenging an insult to his regiment. Nevertheless, this conviction was discovered only in 1680 by the authorities of the French colony in America. Gaultier was then delegated in France to request the protection of the court; Following the intercession of the civil and religious authorities, he obtained from the king in June 1680 letters of remission on account of his honorable life. Then, Gaultier returned to Canada.

== His life in Canada ==
After sailing across the Atlantic, Philippe Gaultier arrived in Quebec City on June 18, 1665. He served in the army. After his military service, he held several significant positions in the administration of the French colony in Quebec City.

Philippe Gaultier obtained the concession of the lordship Comporté and that of La Malbaie in 1672; the latter was bought by the king in 1724, and then granted by Governor Murray on April 27, 1762, to Malcolm Fraser and John Nairn. Nevertheless, he did not clear these concessions. A commemorative plaque from the La Malbaie Foundation in La Malbaie mentions Philippe Gaultier.

In 1683, Philippe Gaultier became one of the founding members of the Compagnie du Nord.

== Family ==
Philippe Gaultier married on November 22, 1672 in the parish of Notre-Dame de Quebec to Marie Bazire. Eleven children were identified of this couple: their daughter Angelique, married Denis Riverin, who was a member of the Sovereign Council and Lieutenant General of the Provost of Quebec; their daughter Marie-Anne married Alexandre Peuvret de Gaudarville, clerk of the Conseil Souverain, as a first marriage.
