= Malbaie River =

Tributary of the St. Lawrence River, MRC de Charlevoix-east (Quebec, Canada)

Malbaie River Rivière Malbaie (in French)
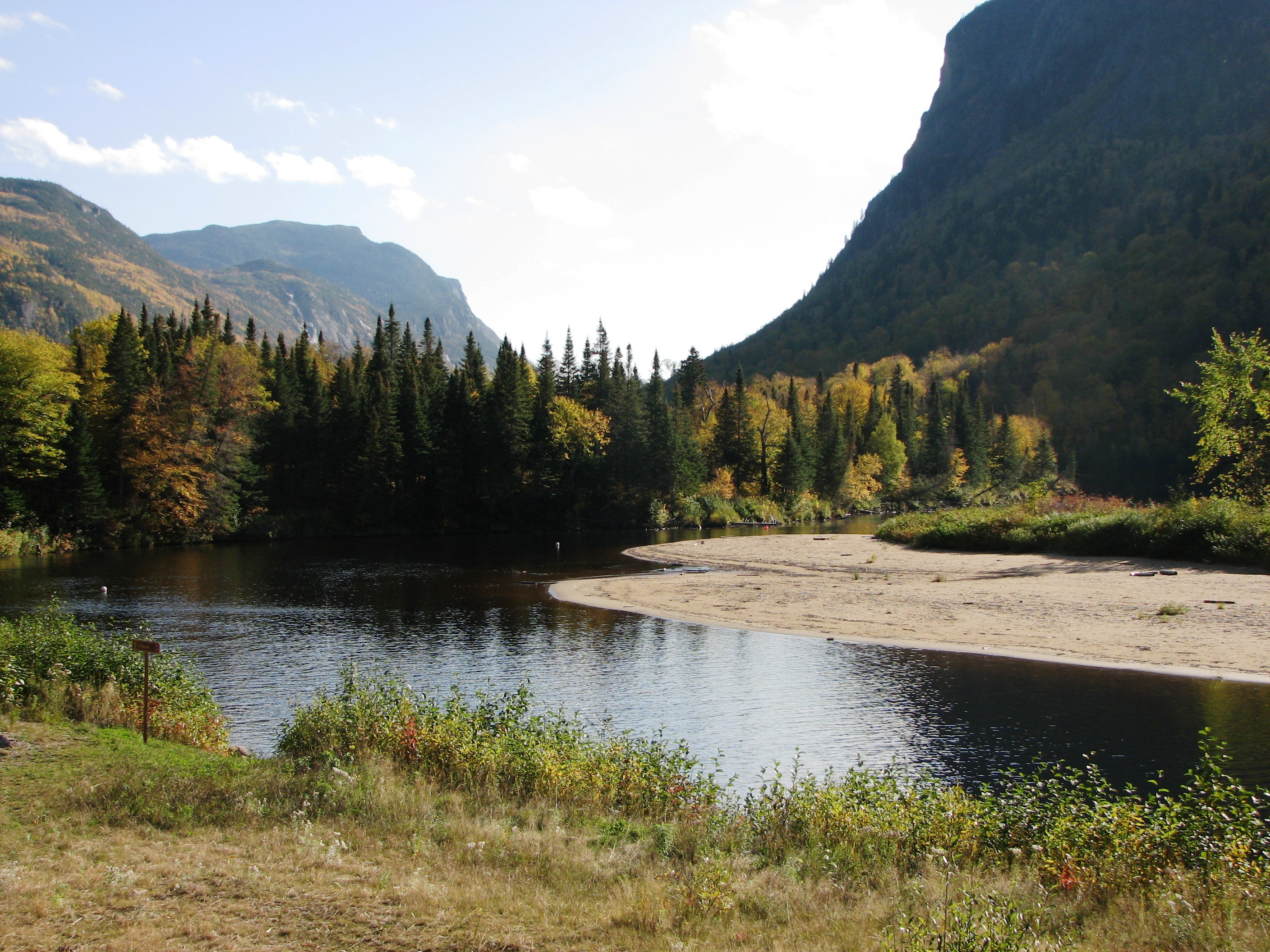
- Malbaie River in Hautes-Gorges-de-la-Rivière-Malbaie National Park

Location
- Country: Canada
- Province: Quebec
- Region: Capitale-Nationale

Physical characteristics
- Source: Petit lac Tristan
  - location: Lac-Jacques-Cartier (unorganized territory), Capitale-Nationale, Quebec, Canada
  - coordinates: 47°28′38″N 70°08′50″W
  - elevation: 893 m (2,930 ft)
- Mouth: Saint Lawrence Estuary
  - location: La Malbaie, Capitale-Nationale, Quebec, Canada
  - coordinates: 47°39′18″N 70°08′50″W
  - elevation: 0 m (0 ft)
- Length: 161 km (100 mi)
- Basin size: 2,059 km^{2} (795 sq mi)

Basin features
- Tributaries
  - left: (upstream): Côte du Pontage Creek, Bouliane Waterway, Comporté River, Dufour Creek, Villeneuve Creek, Desbiens Creek, Jacob River, Snigole River, Lac des Hay, Castors Creek, American Creek, Pont Creek, Scott Creek, Flat Lake Discharge, ruisseau à John (Malbaie River), Amie Lake Discharge, Cran Rouge Creek, Crouch River], Brooks Creek Cows, discharge of Lac Du Lac and Bigras Lake, Chemin des Canots River, dump of Joinville Lake, dump of Lac Pigeon, du Lac du Fond dump, L'Enfer River, dump Lake Saturday, lake discharge (Sunday to Friday), Jack Creek, Silenus Pond outlet, Lac Carrot outlet, Lac Lamfort outlet.
  - right: (upstream): Mailloux River, Lake Nairn outlet, Lake Long dump, Pied des Monts stream, Rouille creek, Foulon stream, Larouche creek, Érables creek, Des Martres River, Du Nord Creek, Caribou Creek, Moreau Lake and Petit Lac des Bouleaux outlet, Porc-Épic River, Froid Creek, Barley River, Faguet Lake outlet, Lake Craine outlet, Petite rivière Malbaie, Duberger Lake outlet, Kimear Lake outlet, Lac des Frelons outlet.

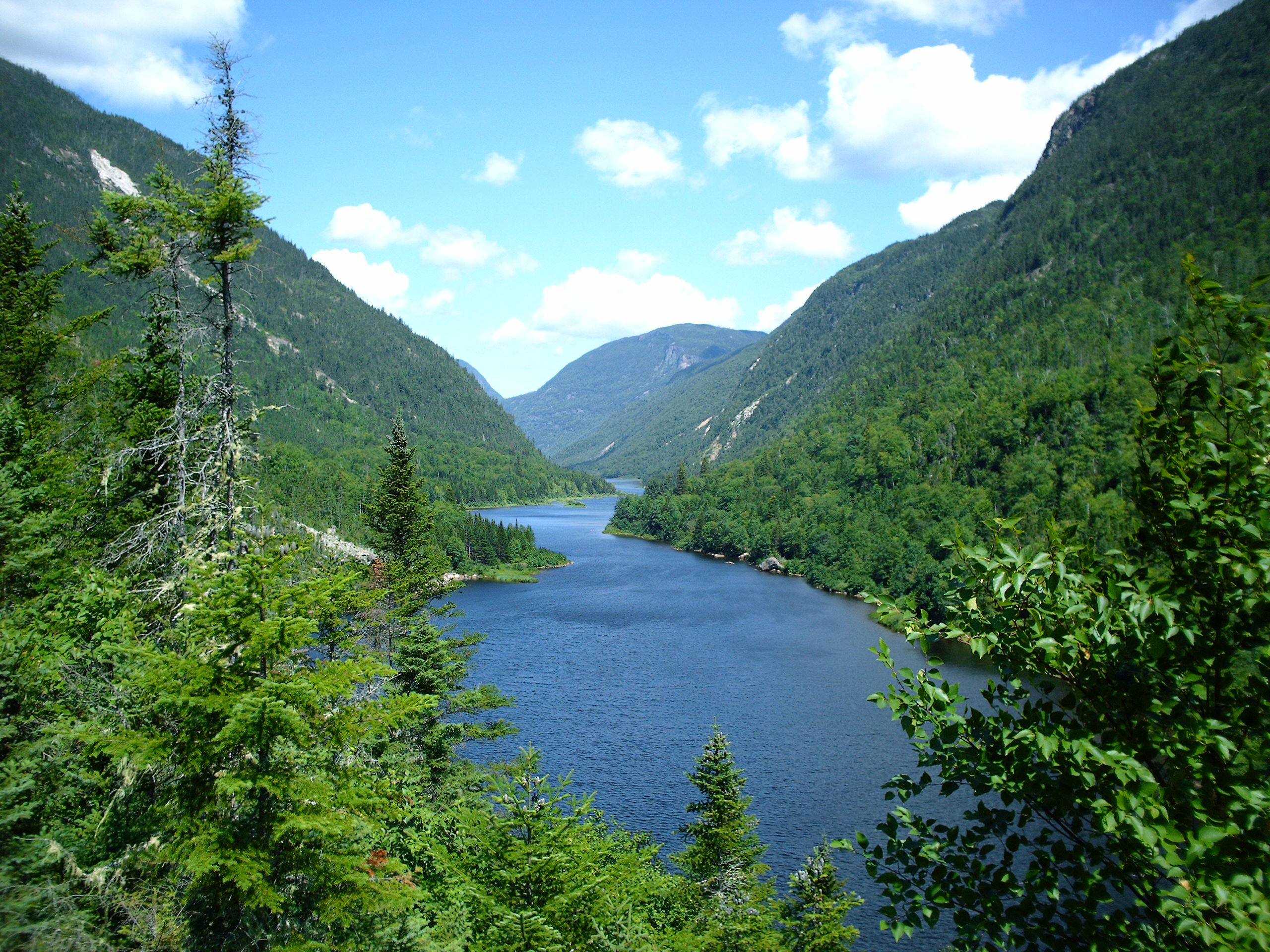
Malbaie River in Hautes-Gorges-de-la-Rivière-Malbaie National Park

The Malbaie River in the Charlevoix region empties into the Saint Lawrence River at La Malbaie. Until 1985 the river was used to transport logs downstream. It flows through a steep valley known as Les Hautes Gorges. A sugar maple and American elm forest grows in the gorge and has remained largely undisturbed for hundreds of years.

Its course successively crosses Grands-Jardins National Park, Laurentides Wildlife Reserve, Zec des Martres, Hautes-Gorges-de-la-Rivière-Malbaie National Park and Zec du Lac-au-Sable. It winds first towards the north-east, towards the east, then towards the south-east, in a narrow and deep glacial valley, for 161 kilometers and a drop of 820 meters.

Its course forms a semicircle stretching towards the north and completely encircling in its center the hydrographic slope of the Rivière du Gouffre. For example, there is a distance of 17.1 kilometres (10.6 mi) between the mouth of the rivières des Martres and the mouth of a stream flowing on the east bank of the upper part of the Malbaie River; at the height of this imaginary line, the course of the Malbaie river stretches north to 10.9 kilometres (6.8 mi). While there is a distance of 48.9 kilometres (30.4 mi) between the mouth of the Malbaie river and the mouth of the Petite rivière Malbaie which flows onto the east bank of the upper part the Malbaie River; at the height of this imaginary line, the course of the Malbaie river stretches north to 32.9 kilometres (20.4 mi). Its watershed and that of the rivière du Gouffre form the Charlevoix Biosphere Reserve.

Le Hautes-Gorges-de-la-Rivière-Malbaie National Park is home to Eastern Canada's tallest rock-faced cliffs. Designated a national park (of the province of Québec) in 2000, the 233-km^{2} Hautes-Gorges is the centrepiece of the UNESCO Charlevoix biosphere reserve.

== Geography ==
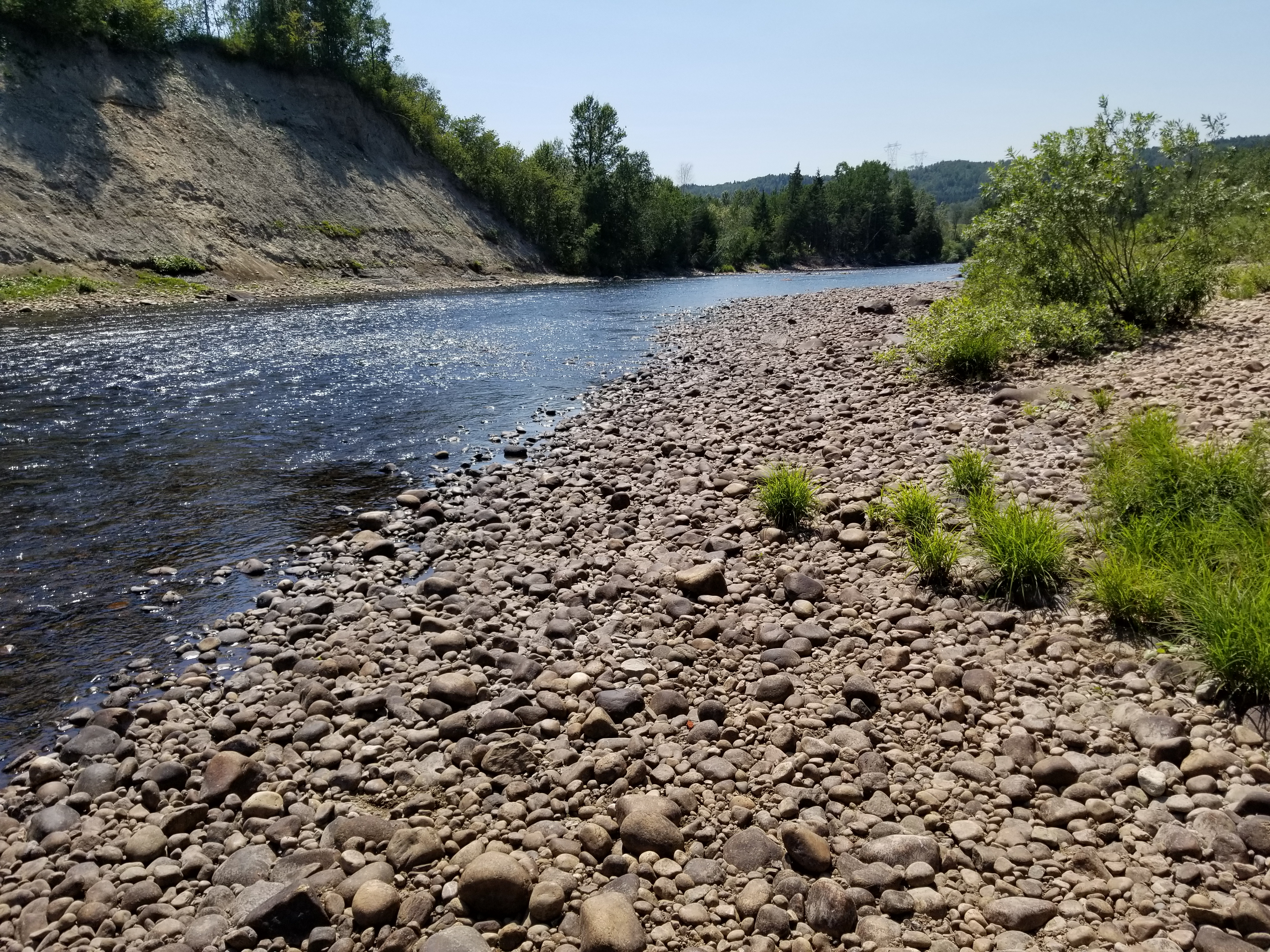
Course of Malbaie River at the height of the city of Clermont, downstream from the municipal park.

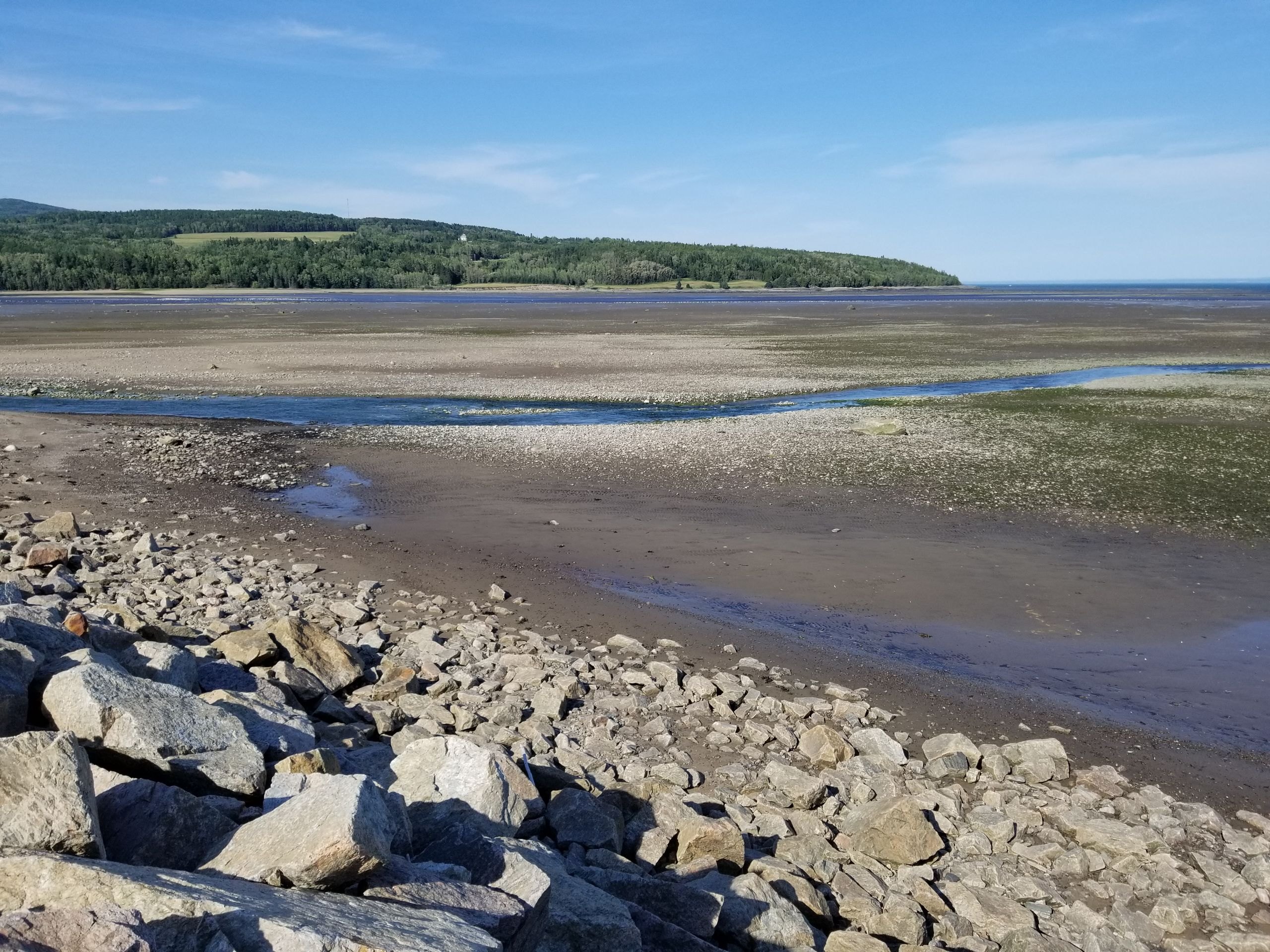
Bay at low tide at the mouth of the Malbaie River, in La Malbaie. This bay also receives the waters of the Mailloux River (west shore) and of the Côte à Pontage Creek (east side)..

"Little Tristan Lake" is the "head lake" of the Malbaie River hydrographic slope. It is located in a swampy area in a small valley of mountains. It discharges to the north where water flows 1.0 kilometre (0.62 mi) through swamps to Tristan Lake (1.8 kilometres (1.1 mi) long) that flows through its full length from south to north. The landfill continues for 3.0 kilometres (1.9 mi) north to Gamache Lake (0.86 km), which crosses the stream from south to north for 0.6 kilometres (0.37 mi). This last lake has a large central island.

From Gamache Lake, the waters flow north for 1.4 kilometres (0.87 mi) to the outlet of Lamfort Lake. From there, the Malbaie River descends for 5.7 kilometres (3.5 mi) to Fradette Lake (2.5 kilometres (1.6 mi), oriented to the northeast), which flows through to its full length. Lake Frenette receives by the north-west the waters of lakes Carroll, Milton and Brunette. From the mouth of Fradette Lake, the river flows 2.4 kilometres (1.5 mi) northeast to Lake Malbaie. The current of the Malbaie River crosses this lake from south to north for 2.3 kilometres (1.4 mi).

The Malbaie Lake outlet is located to the north.

Upper course of the Malbaie River downstream of Malbaie Lake (segment of 53.6 kilometres (33.3 mi))

- 3.6 kilometres (2.2 mi) towards the north by collecting the outlet of Lac Saulmer (coming from the west), then branching east, until the outlet (coming from the north) of a series of lakes including Lac à Jack, Lac Fronsac and Petit Lac à Jack;
- 12.0 kilometres (7.5 mi) towards the north-east by collecting the outlet (coming from the north-west) from the Lac des Sixty-Six, then towards the north, until the confluence of the Jardin River;
- 6.0 kilometres (3.7 mi) towards the north by collecting the discharge (coming from the south-east) of Lake Duberger, until the confluence of the L'Enfer River;
- 7.7 kilometres (4.8 mi) to the north by collecting the discharge (coming from the west) from Pigeon Lake, then bending towards the northeast at the end of the segment, until the confluence of the Petite rivière Malbaie (coming from the east);
- 6.1 kilometres (3.8 mi) towards the north bending towards the northwest at the end of the segment up to a bend corresponding to the confluence of the Chemin des Canots River (coming from the south);
- 9.1 kilometres (5.7 mi) to the north, forming some coils up to the Barley river (coming from the east);
- 9.1 kilometres (5.7 mi) towards the north by collecting the Cold stream (coming from the east) and the Cow's stream (coming from the west), forming a loop towards the northeast and an S, to the confluence of the rivière à la Cruche (coming from the west);

Intermediate course of the Malbaie river downstream of the Cruche River (segment of 45.1 kilometres (28.0 mi))

- 0.7 kilometres (0.43 mi) north-east until the confluence of the Porc-Épic River (coming from the east);
- 6.8 kilometres (4.2 mi) towards the north, forming a large curve towards the east, up to the outlet (coming from the east) of the lake;
- 4.1 kilometres (2.5 mi) towards the northwest by collecting the Cran Rouge stream (coming from the south) up to a bend in the river;
- 3.4 kilometres (2.1 mi) north-east to Caribou stream (coming from the east);
- 6.2 kilometres (3.9 mi) northeasterly to ruisseau à John (Malbaie River) (coming from the north);
- 6.5 kilometres (4.0 mi) to the east in a deep valley by collecting the discharge (coming from the north) from Lac Plat, then forming a loop towards the south, to a stream (coming from the north);
- 11.7 kilometres (7.3 mi) towards the east in a deep valley crossing a few rapids at the start of the segment, collecting the North stream (coming from the south) and Scott stream (coming from the north), until at a bend in the river;
- 5.7 kilometres (3.5 mi) to the south in a deep valley crossing the “Les Eaux-Mortes” section and a widening of the river, up to the rivière des Martres (coming from Where is);

Lower course of the Malbaie river downstream of the Martres river (segment of 22.9 kilometres (14.2 mi))

- 2.1 kilometres (1.3 mi) towards the south-east until the Ruisseau des Érables (coming from the south-west);
- 6.8 kilometres (4.2 mi) east to the Larouche stream (from the south), then northeast to the Pont stream (from the northwest);
- 4.8 kilometres (3.0 mi) to the east, then south, passing to the east of a mountain, collecting the Cold stream (coming from the west), to the Foulon stream (coming from West);
- 2.8 kilometres (1.7 mi) towards the south by forming a loop towards the west at the end of the segment, up to the Rouillé stream (coming from the southwest);
- 6.4 kilometres (4.0 mi) by forming a 2.1 kilometres (1.3 mi) hook towards the north, then towards the east, the south-east and finally the east, until the brook of the Americans (coming from the north);

Lower course of the Malbaie river downstream from the ruisseau des Americans (segment of 30.9 kilometres (19.2 mi))

- 4.6 kilometres (2.9 mi) to the south, forming a large curve towards the east, collecting the stream of Beavers (coming from the east), up to the stream of Pied des Monts (coming from the Where is);
- 10.1 kilometres (6.3 mi) towards the south-east by collecting the outlet (coming from the west) of Long Lake, then towards the northeast by winding, until the outlet of Lake Nairne (coming from South);
- 4.3 kilometres (2.7 mi) towards the east by forming a big loop towards the north, until the confluence of the Snigole River (coming from the northwest) which flows in the middle of a dam lake (length: 1.9 kilometres (1.2 mi); altitude: 59 metres (194 ft));
- 2.0 kilometres (1.2 mi) to the east by crossing a small dam, up to the confluence of the Jacob (coming from the north);
- 7.4 kilometres (4.6 mi) to the east, forming large loops in the town of La Malbaie, until the confluence of the Comporté River (coming from the north);
- 2.5 kilometres (1.6 mi) eastward to its mouth.

The Malbaie River flows into downtown La Malbaie on the northwest shore of the St. Lawrence River.

== Toponymy ==
In 1608, Samuel de Champlain named this stream "Rivière Platte" or "Malle Baye". After the English conquest, the seigneuries of Mount Murray and Murray Bay, so that the English have long named this river Murray River. With time, the Malbaie river finally prevails.

Champlain calls the bay "Malbaie" in the sense of bad because at low tide the latter dries up and the boats run aground. As for "Murray", he owes his name to James Murray, first governor of province of Quebec, which conceded two seigneuries at the mouth of the river.

== See also ==
- Malbaie Lake (La Côte-de-Beaupré)
- La Malbaie, a municipality
- Laurentides Wildlife Reserve
- Grands-Jardins
- Hautes-Gorges-de-la-Rivière-Malbaie
- Biosphere Reserve of Charlevoix
- Petite rivière Malbaie
- St. Lawrence River
- List of rivers of Quebec
