= Hautes-Gorges-de-la-Rivière-Malbaie National Park =

Park in Quebec, Canada

- Parc national des Hautes-Gorges-de-la-Rivière-Malbaie
- IUCN category II (national park)
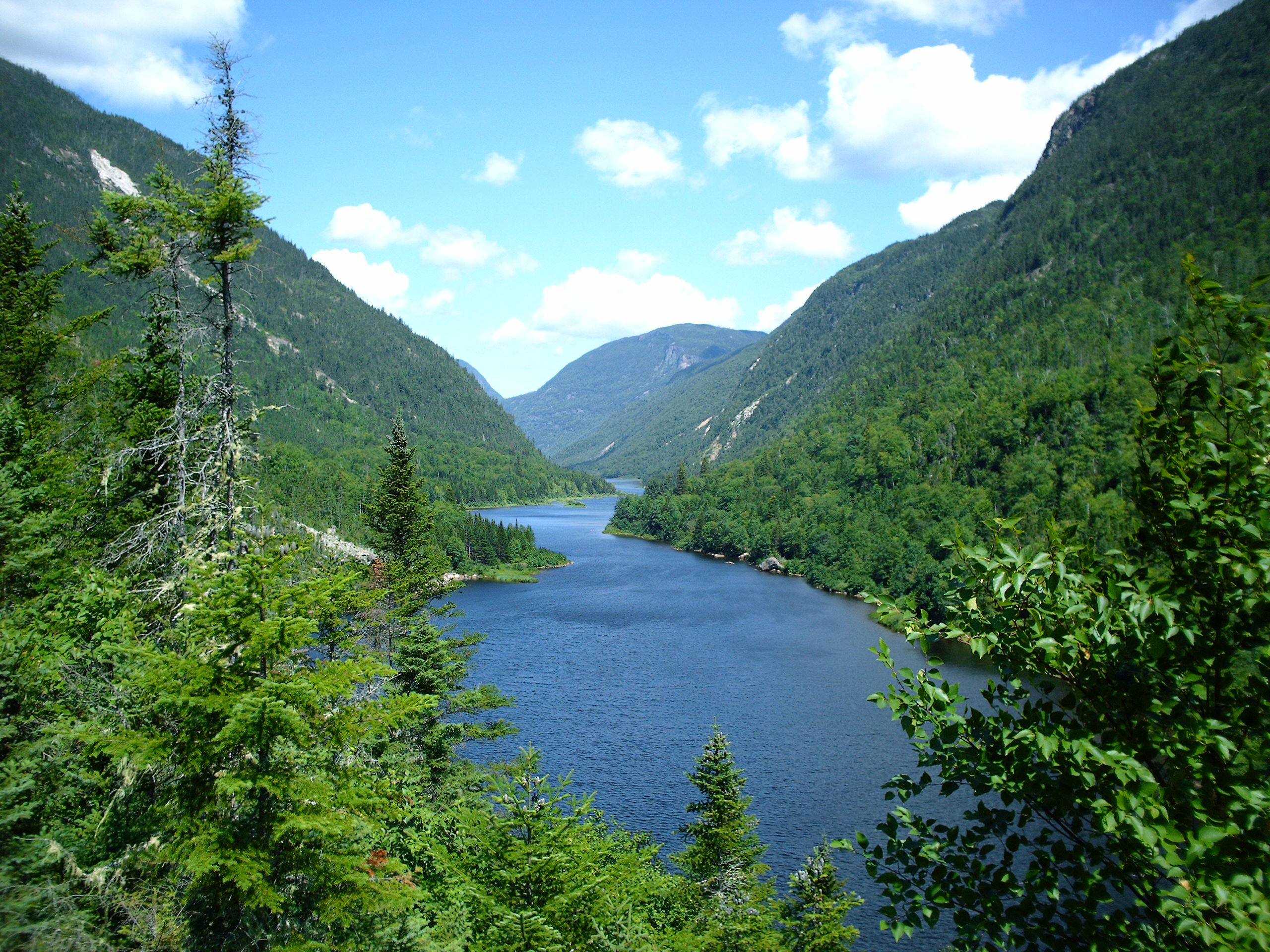
- Interactive map of Hautes-Gorges-de-la-Rivière-Malbaie National Park
- Location: Lac-Pikauba, Charlevoix Regional County Municipality / Mont-Élie, Charlevoix-Est Regional County Municipality, Quebec, Canada
- Nearest city: La Malbaie
- Coordinates: 47°56′00″N 70°31′00″W
- Area: 224.7 km (139.6 mi)
- Established: June 28, 2000; 26 years ago
- Governing body: SEPAQ
- Website: www.sepaq.com/pq/hgo/fr/

The Hautes-Gorges-de-la-Rivière-Malbaie National Park (French: Parc national des Hautes-Gorges-de-la-Rivière-Malbaie (Note: pronounced [paʁk nɑsjɔnal de ot ɡɔʁʒ də la ʁivjɛʁ malbɛ])) is a provincial park in the Charlevoix region of Quebec, Canada. Centring on the Malbaie River Gorge, it is the centrepiece of the UNESCO Charlevoix biosphere reserve. It is administered by the Société des établissements de plein air du Québec (Sépaq). The park can be reached via a local road, 30 kilometers (19 mi) northwards from Route 138 in Saint-Aimé-des-Lacs.

The park has a total area of 224.7 square kilometres (86.8 mi^{2}) and was created as a provincial park in 2000. The 9.2-square-kilometre (3.6 mi^{2}) Grands-Ormes Ecological Reserve is an enclave within the park.

The park lies within the Eastern forest-boreal transition ecoregion.

== Description ==
This provincial park is represented by a deep valley in high mountains with steep walls over 800 meters (2,600 ft) in height. There are many waterfalls and falls, the highest of which is 160 meters (520 ft), as well as many mammals typical of the boreal forest, including the American marten and the Boreal woodland caribou which frequent the isolated summits of the park. The park also encloses the Grands-Ormes Ecological Reserve.

At the heart of this valley, whose walls can reach up to 800 metres (2,600 ft) in height, flows the Malbaie River, frequented among others by the Sea Lamprey as well as by the Atlantic salmon.

The park is managed by the Quebec government through the Société des établissements de plein air du Québec (Quebec Outdoor Establishments Society) (SÉPAQ).

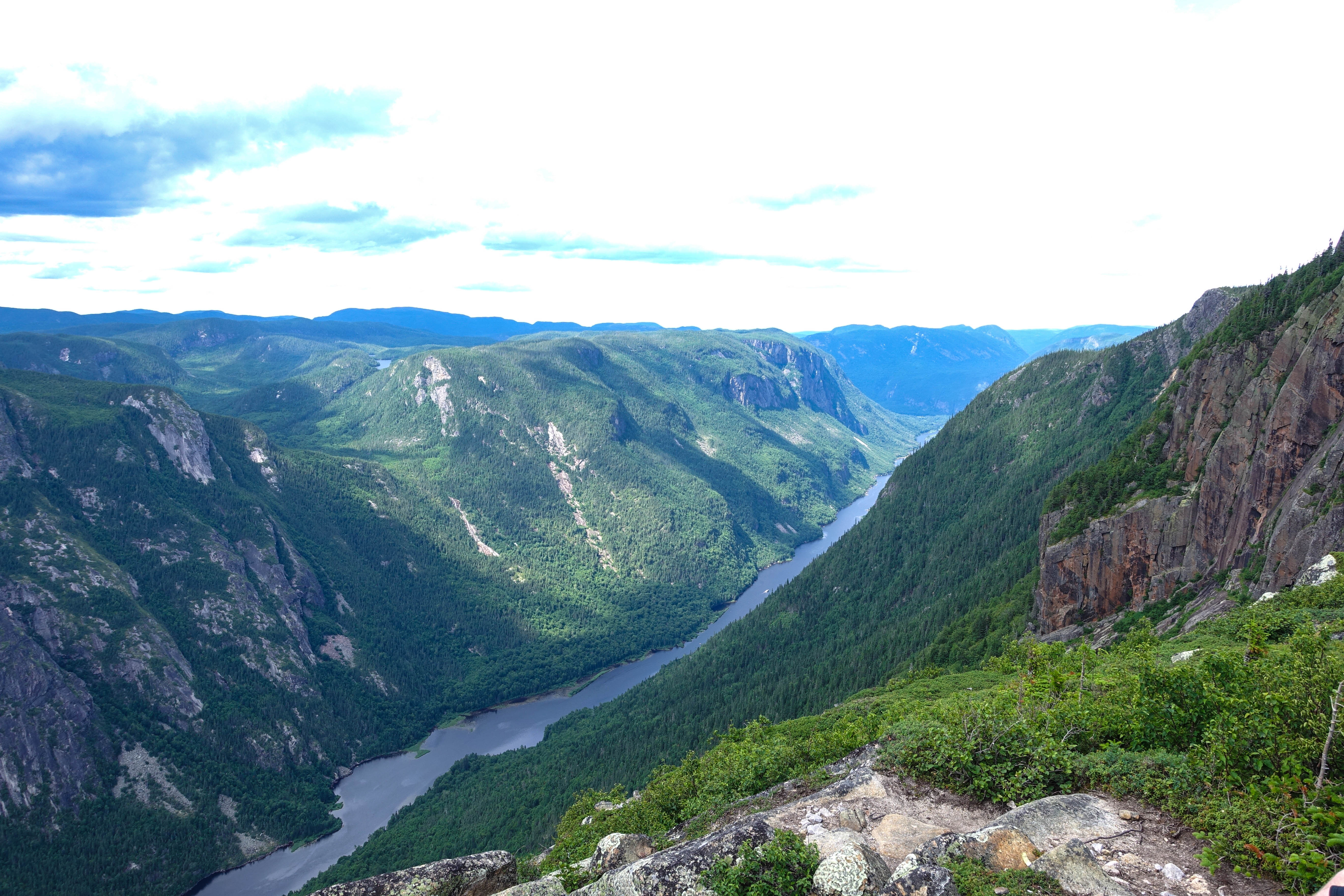
A view from Acropole des Draveurs, a hiking trail along the high gorges overlooking the Malbaie River, in summer.

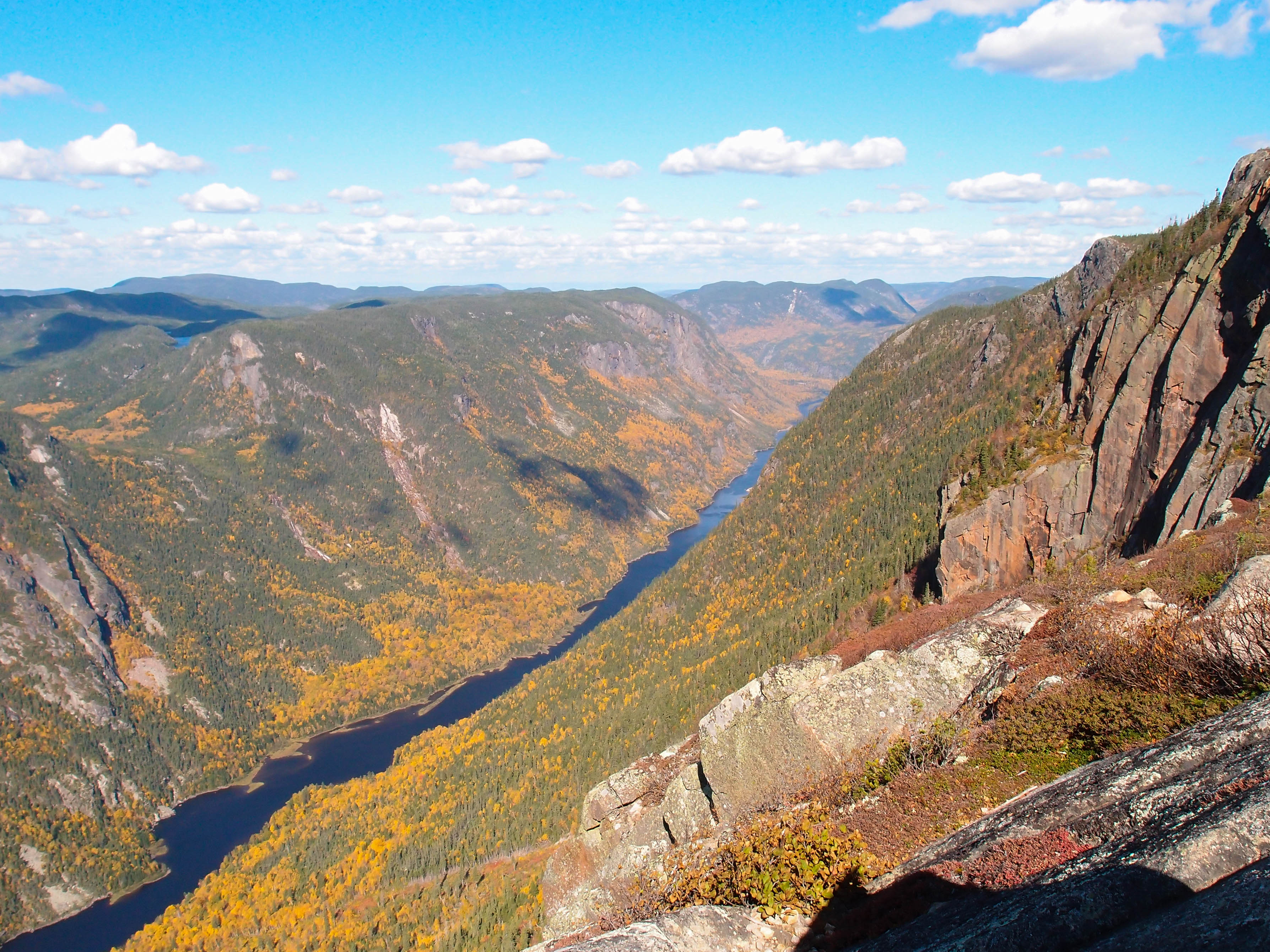
A view from Acropole des Draveurs, a hiking trail along the high gorges overlooking the Malbaie River, in autumn.

== History ==
Canadians first visited the area in the course of exploration of the Malbaie River only in the first half of the 19th century. In the beginning of the 20th century, commercial exploitation of the forest started, accompanied by timber rafting. At the same time, tourists started to frequent the area. William Hume Blake was one of the early tourists who repeatedly visited the gorge. On 13 September 1988, the regional park was opened. In 1989, it became part of the UNESCO Charlevoix World biosphe reserve. In 2000, the government of Quebec officially opened the national park.

- 1970: The first field surveys take place by the Ministry of Tourism, Hunting and Fishing to specify what a park project could be in the Hautes-Gorges.
- 1975: Even if it is not yet a National Park in the legal sense, the Parc des Hautes-Gorges-de-la-Rivière-Malbaie appears for the first time in the programming of the Ministry of Tourism, Hunting and some fishing.
- 1977: An investment of $64000 is made there by the Ministry of Lands and Forests in order to build basic reception facilities.
- 1979: While the Laurentides Wildlife Reserve is about to be created, the Ministry of Recreation, Hunting and Fishing gives up creating at the same time the Hautes-Gorges Park as expected since this would have increased the compensation costs to be paid to the logging company too much then benefiting from a forest concession which included these two parks.
- 1983: The Ministry of Recreation, Hunting and Fishing announces its intention to create the Hautes-Gorges-de-la-Rivière-Malbaie park during the Summit on the economy of the greater region of the Capital.
- 1985: The last logging takes place in the Hautes-Gorges since the Ministry of Energy and Resources proceeds to the retrocession of the part of the concession of the Donohue company located in the park project.
- 1996: The flood of July 19 (see Saguenay Flood) wreaks havoc in the park and it is closed for the rest of the season because its roads have become unusable.
- 2000: Legal creation of the park by the Government of Quebec, thus becoming the 20th park of the Parc-Québec network.
- 2017: On September 13, the park boundaries are extended by 20 hectares (49 acres) to reach 224.9 kilometres (139.75 mi).

== Geography ==
The park is located in a mountainous environment, in the chain of the Laurentian Mountains, more precisely in the east of the Jacques-Cartier Massif. The rugged terrain of the Hautes-Gorges structures the landscape of the park into five major physiographic units:

- The high mountains: occupies the east of the park, over an area of 51.6 kilometres (32.06 mi), and includes most of the park's peaks, including the Montagne des Érables, the Mont Élie and Mont Jérémie.
- The Scott Lake plateau: with an area of 32.2 kilometres (20.01 mi), this plateau occupies the northern part of the park and its altitude is in the 750 class at 900 metres (3,000 ft). Flat or gently sloping areas are rare and mainly located in the depressions of Lac Scott and Ruisseau Blanc.
- Vallée de la rivière Malbaie: as its name suggests, this unit includes the valley of the Malbaie River as well as the peaks adjacent to it. This unit has an area of 103.4 kilometres (64.25 mi) and crosses the park from side to side, in its center. The valley and its river are initially oriented north-south to become abruptly east-west in the sector aptly named L'Équerre. The lowest point in the park is located in this area on the southeastern border of the park where the topographic reading indicates an elevation of 190 metres (620 ft).
- The West Plateau: With an area of 72.5 kilometres (45.05 mi), this unit is characterized by the altitude class 750 to 900 metres (3,000 ft), although the class 600 to 750 metres (2,460 ft) also occupies significant space. A few summits over 900 metres (3,000 ft) also exist there, particularly in the Porc-Épic lake sector.
- Martres River Valley: located south of the West Plateau and east of the Malbaie River Valley, this fifth physiographic unit covers an area of 30.3 kilometres (18.83 mi). Its relief is the lowest in the entire park, around 400 metres (1,300 ft).

== Recreation ==
Activities available in the park include hiking, riverboat cruises, canoeing, kayaking, fishing, cycling, rabaska, birding, ice climbing, and camping.

There are three camp sites in the park, one of which can only be reached by canoeing or biking.

The park contains seven hiking trails totaling 32.9 kilometers (20.4 mi), including one that is 10.5 kilometers (6.5 mi) long with an 800 meters (2,600 ft) elevation gain. On these trails, hikers can reach the top of the Montagne des Érables, the highest summit in the park, at an elevation of 1,048 meters (3,438 ft).

The 8 kilometers (5.0 mi) bike trail takes visitors through the gorge along the Malbaie River, while a short hike leads to the chute du Ruisseau Blanc (White Stream Waterfalls) 45 meters (148 ft) high, which is fed from one of the many high altitude lakes and suspended valleys.

Cars are not allowed in the park. There is a parking at the gate, where one needs to register and pay to get access to the park. From there, visitors may take a bus that will get them to some points in the park, and to the Draveur Service Centre.

== Gallery ==
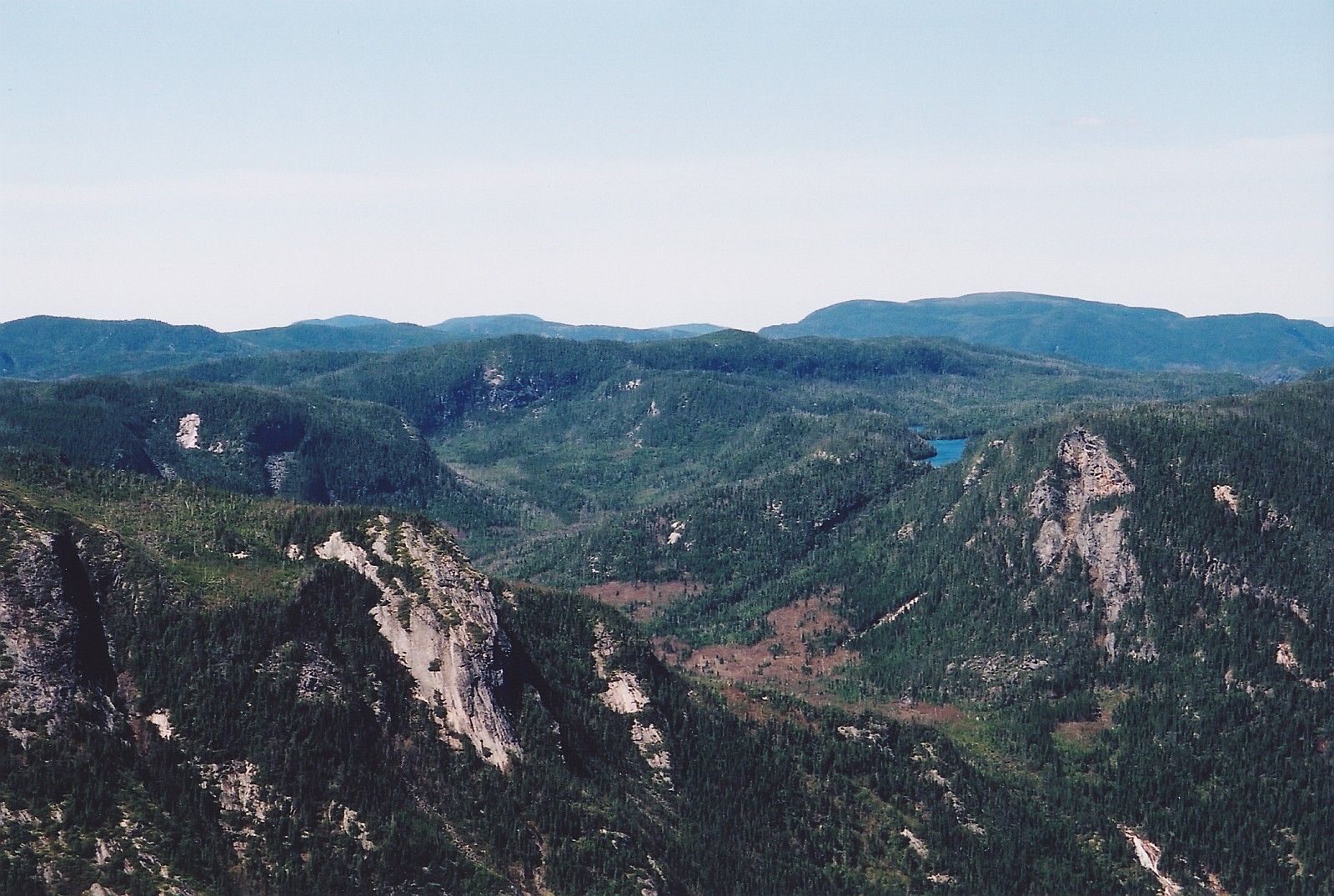
The Laurentian Mountains seen from the Acropole des Draveurs in the Parc des Hautes-Gorges

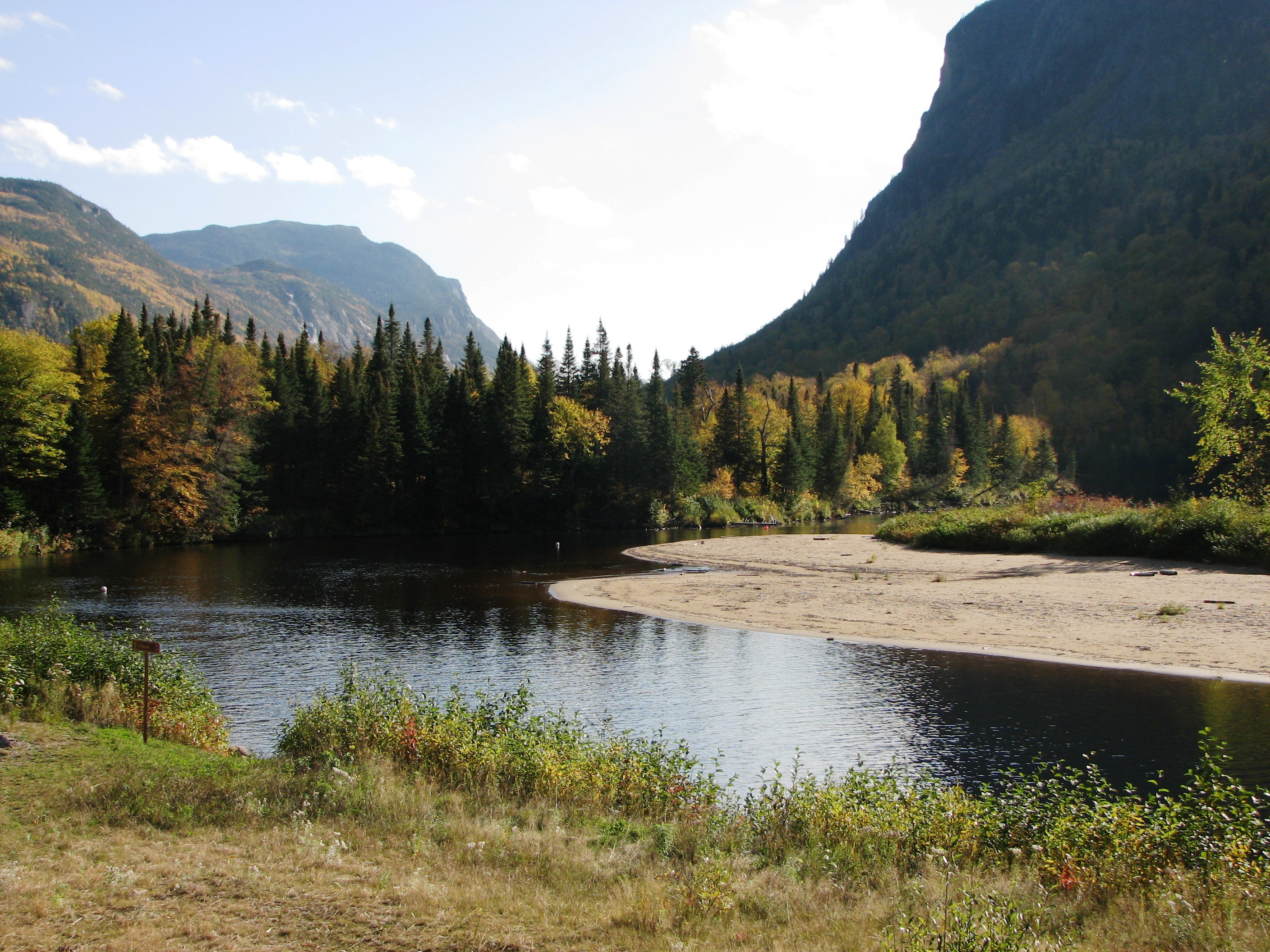
Bottom of the valley of the Malbaie River

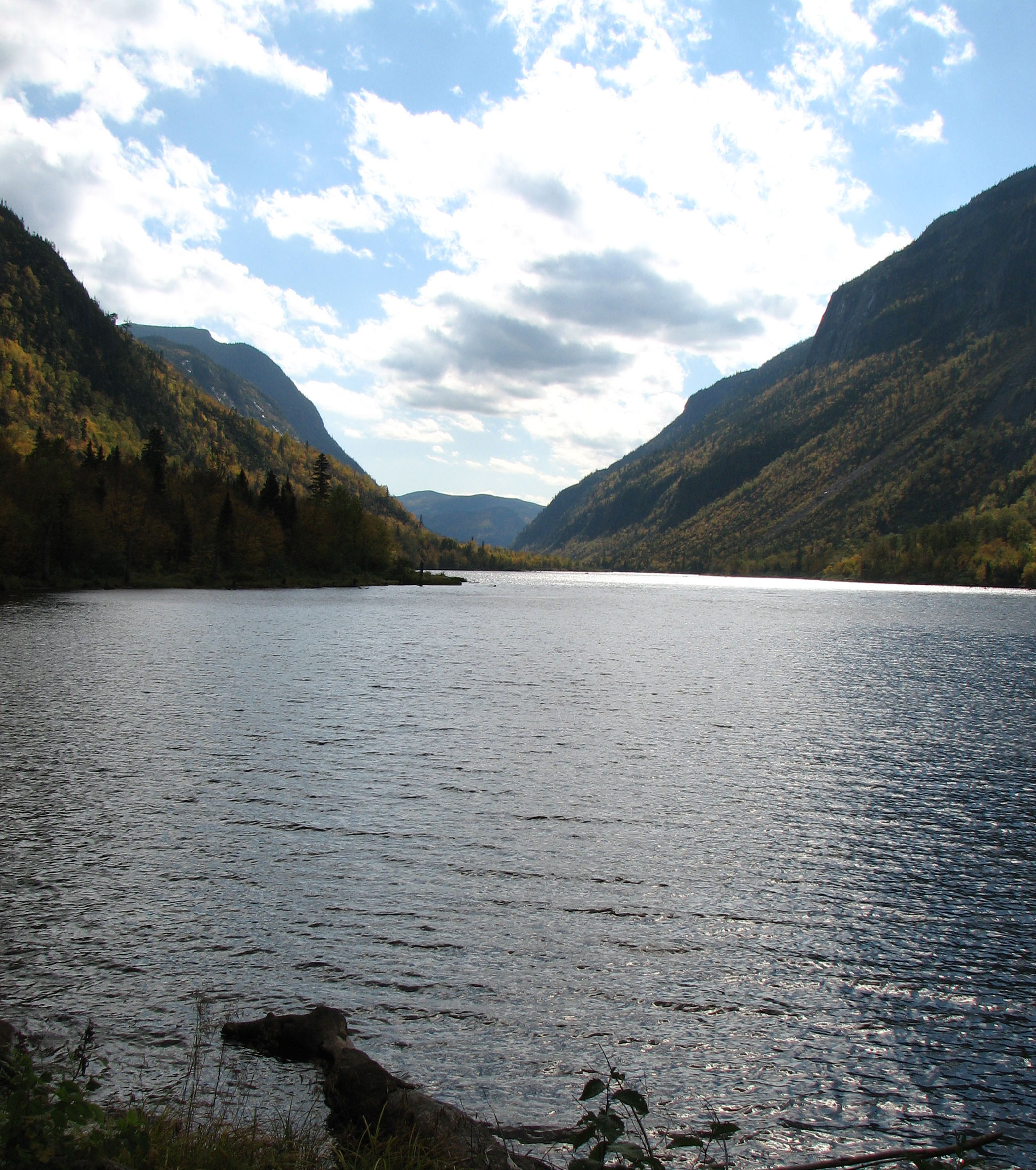
The Malbaie River not far from the dam

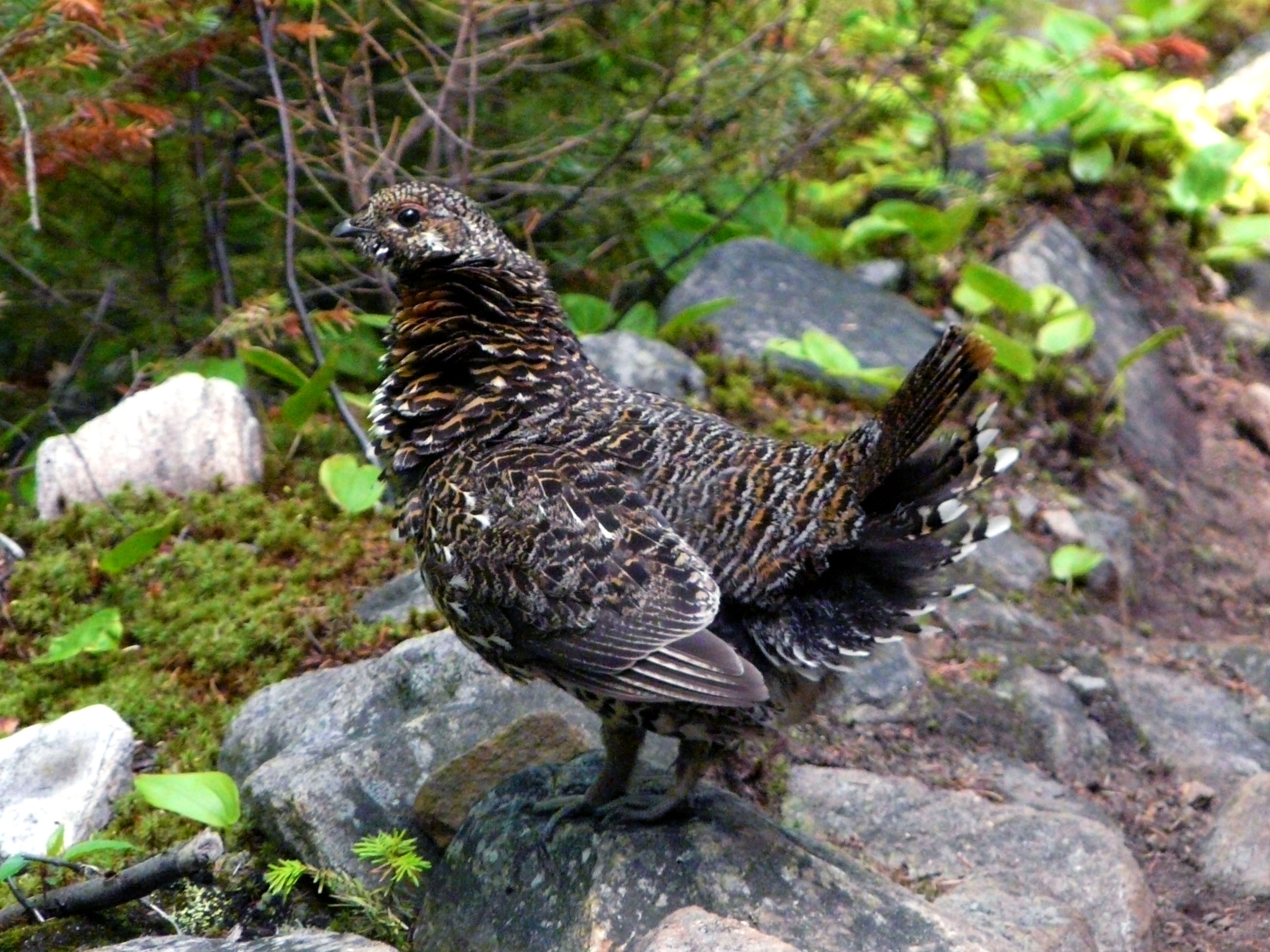
Ruffed Grouse

== See also ==
- National Parks of Canada
- List of Quebec national parks
- Saint-Aimé-des-Lacs, Quebec
- Rivière des Martres
- La Malbaie, Quebec
- Malbaie River
- Montagne des Érables
