= Mont-Élie =

- Unorganized territory
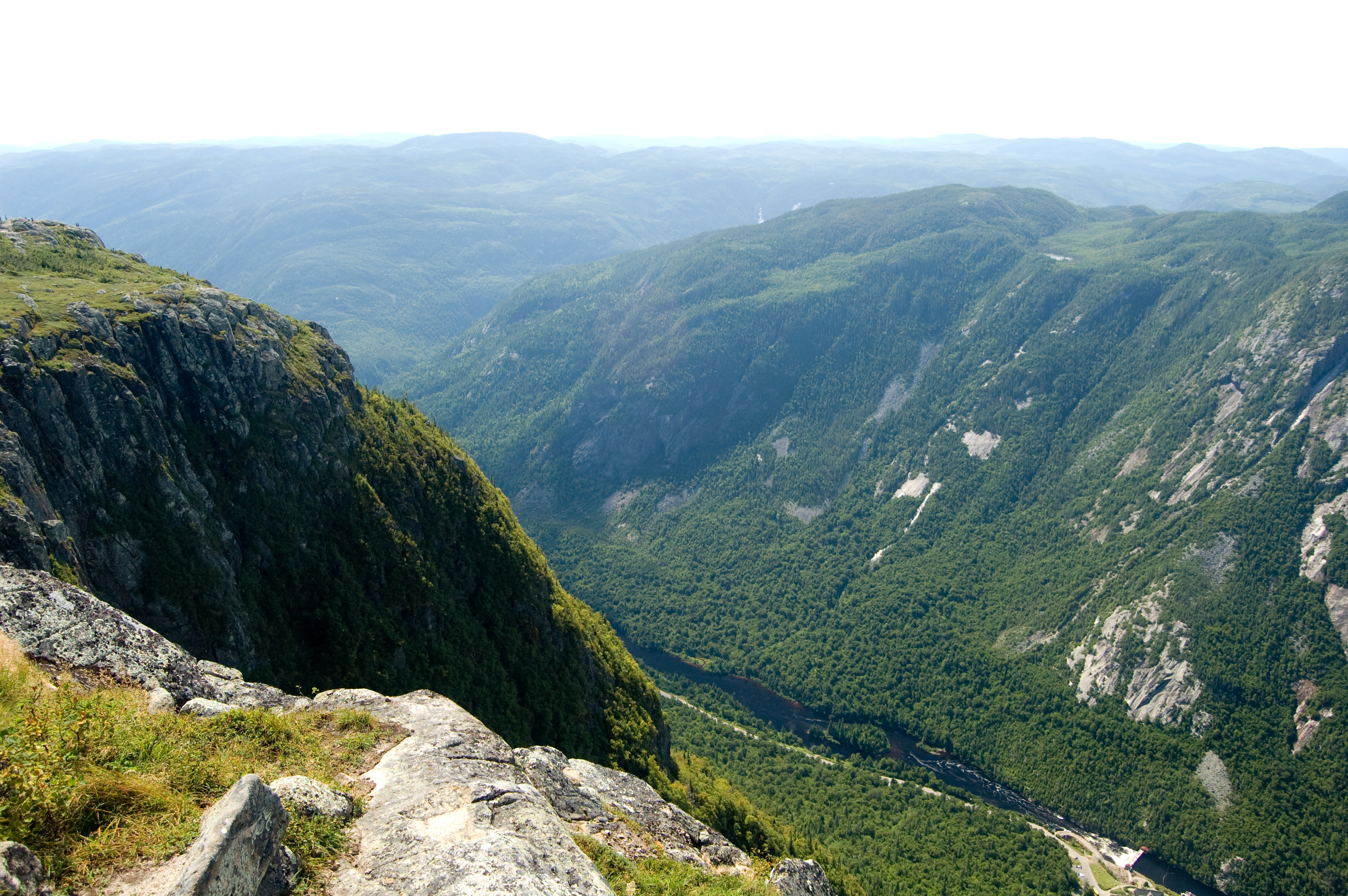
- View from Acropole des Draveurs

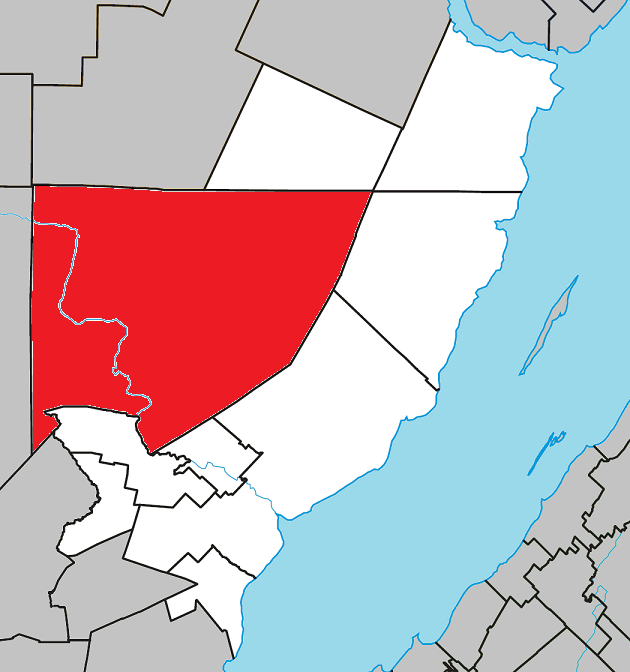
- Location within Charlevoix-Est RCM

- Location in central Quebec
- Coordinates: 47°56′N 70°21′W
- Country: Canada
- Province: Quebec
- Region: Capitale-Nationale
- RCM: Charlevoix-Est
- Constituted: unspecified

Government
  - Federal riding: Montmorency—Charlevoix
  - Prov. riding: Charlevoix–Côte-de-Beaupré

Area
  - Total: 888.02 km^{2} (342.87 sq mi)
  - Land: 851.18 km^{2} (328.64 sq mi)

Population (2021)
  - Total: 51
  - Density: 0.1/km^{2} (0.26/sq mi)
  - Pop (2016-21): ▼19%
  - Dwellings: 85
- Time zone: UTC−5 (EST)
  - Summer (DST): UTC−4 (EDT)
- Area codes: 418 and 581
- Highways: R-170

Mont-Élie is an unorganized territory in the Capitale-Nationale region of Quebec, Canada. It makes up almost 38% of the Charlevoix-Est Regional County Municipality.

The territory is home to the Grands-Ormes Ecological Reserve and part of the Hautes-Gorges-de-la-Rivière-Malbaie National Park. It is named after Mount Élie that in turn was named after Elijah. Nearby are other mountains and lakes named after Biblical prophets, such as Moses and Jeremiah. Mount Élie (47°55′01″N 70°21′42″W) is one of the main summits of the mountainous highland in the east of the Charlevoix region. With an altitude of 1,021 meters (3,350 ft), it provides a great view of the vast surroundings and was formerly used as a location for fire watch. Its western slope forms the eastern boundary of the Hautes-Gorges-de-la-Rivière-Malbaie National Park, whereas its eastern side is part of Zec du Lac-au-Sable.

== Demographics ==
=== Population ===
Historical Census Data - Mont-Élie, Quebec

Year	Pop.	±%
1991	5	—
1996	37	+640.0%
2001	60	+62.2%
2006	75	+25.0%

Year	Pop.	±%
2011	77	+2.7%
2016	63	−18.2%
2021	51	−19.0%

Source: Statistics Canada

Private dwellings occupied by usual residents (2021): 27 (total dwellings: 85)

== See also ==
- List of unorganized territories in Quebec
