= Clermont, Capitale-Nationale =

Clermont
- City
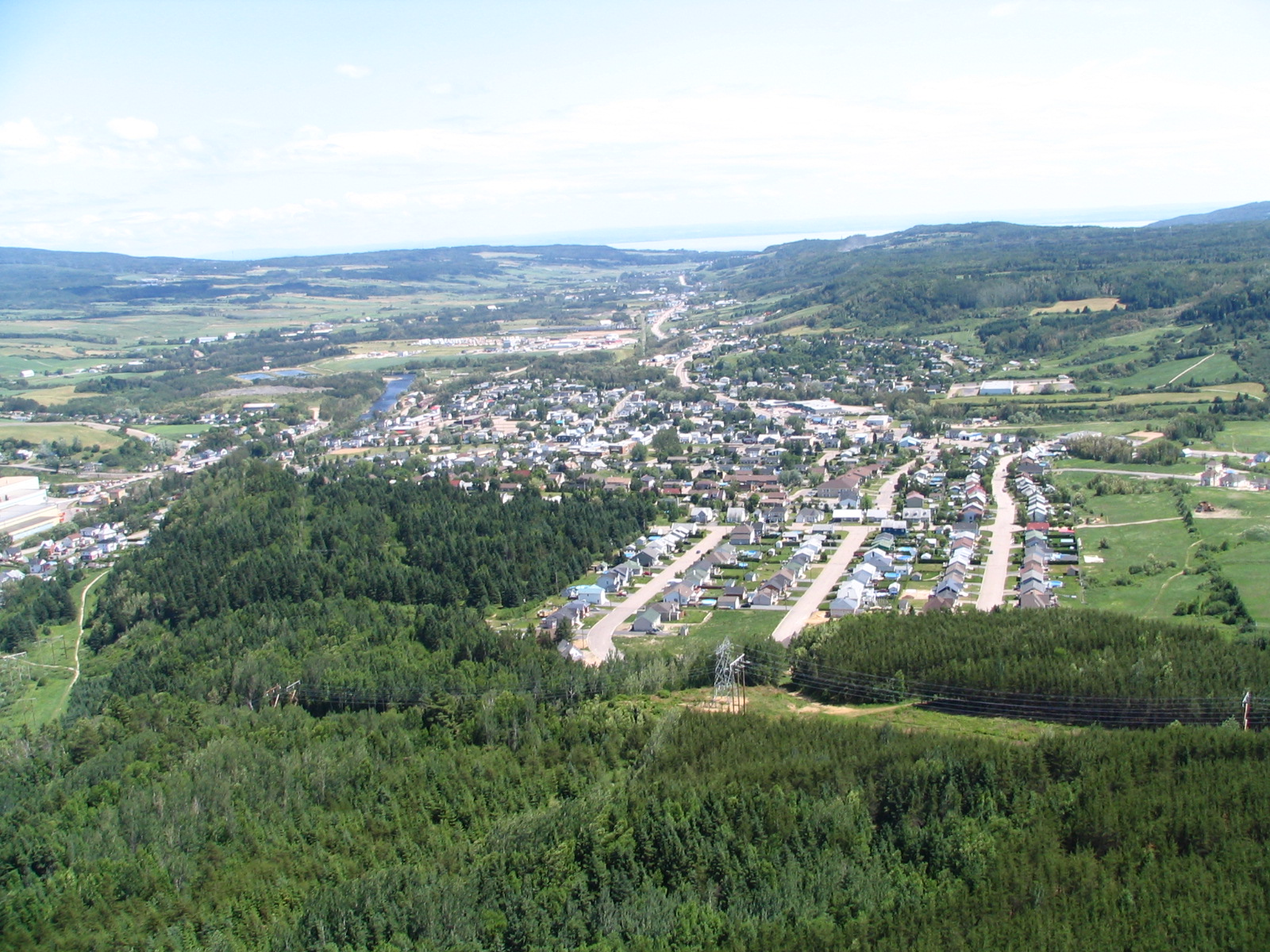

- Coat of arms

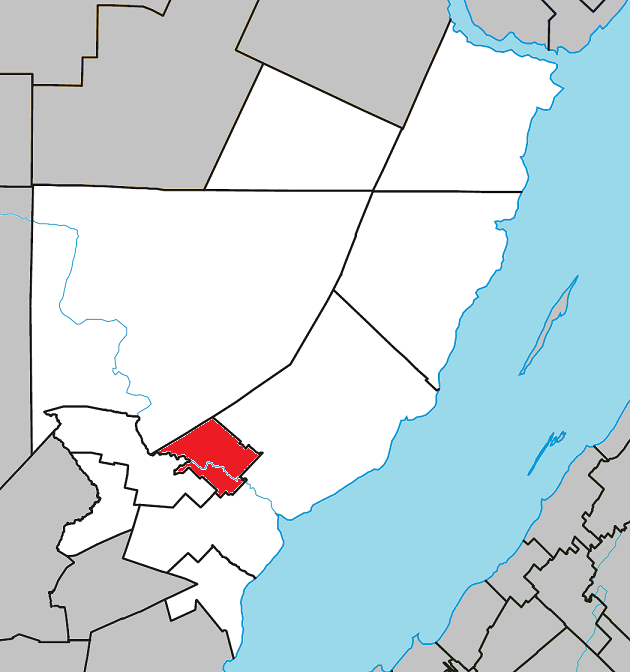
- Location within Charlevoix-Est RCM

- Location in central Quebec
- Coordinates: 47°41′N 70°14′W
- Country: Canada
- Province: Quebec
- Region: Capitale-Nationale
- RCM: Charlevoix-Est
- Settled: 1800
- Constituted: February 16, 1935

Government
  - Mayor: Luc Cauchon
  - Federal riding: Montmorency—Charlevoix
  - Prov. riding: Charlevoix–Côte-de-Beaupré

Area
  - Total: 52.69 km^{2} (20.34 sq mi)
  - Land: 51.53 km^{2} (19.90 sq mi)

Population (2021)
  - Total: 3,065
  - Density: 59.5/km^{2} (154/sq mi)
  - Pop (2016-21): ▼0.6%
  - Dwellings: 1,490
- Time zone: UTC−5 (EST)
  - Summer (DST): UTC−4 (EDT)
- Postal code(s): G4A
- Area codes: 418 and 581
- Highways: R-138
- Website: ville.clermont.qc.ca

Clermont (French pronunciation: [klɛʁmɔ̃]) is a ville in the Canadian province of Quebec, and the seat of government for the Charlevoix-Est Regional County Municipality. It is located on the southern banks of the Malbaie River.

== History ==
Around 1800, the first settlers moved into the area, living primarily of agriculture. Followed by a saw and flour mill, tradeshops, and stores, a settlement grew that was then known as Chute Nairne. At the close of the century, the place attracted attention for its hydro-electric potential, and by 1900, a dam was built across the Malbaie River, supplying electricity to La Malbaie and surrounding area.

In 1909, Rodolphe Forget founded the East Canada Power and Pulp Company, and wanting to profit from the phenomenal growth in the pulp and paper market, he built Chute Nairne's first paper mill in 1911. The industrial development changed the place from a rural and agricultural society to a rapidly growing urban community.

Félix-Antoine Savard, famous Québécois author and at that time priest of the Parish of Saint-Étienne in La Malbaie, was also responsible for Chute Nairne. His parishioners there were upset about being left a bit to themselves and about being far away from the parish church. Savard, at the request of residents of Chute Nairne, petitioned the bishop of Chicoutimi, Charles Lamarche, to obtain permission for a new parish and church. The request was accepted on September 18, 1931, and the Parish of Saint-Philippe-de-la-Chute-Nairn was formed, also called Parish of Saint-Philippe-de-Clermont, because Félix-Antoine Savard greatly admired and paid tribute to Blaise Pascal who came from Clermont-Ferrand in France.

On February 16, 1935, the place separated from the Parish Municipalities of Saint-Etienne de Murray-Bay and Sainte-Agnès (currently both part of La Malbaie) and was incorporated as a municipality, officially adopting the name Clermont for the new municipality.

In 1949, Clermont changed its status to village and in 1967 to town.

== Demographics ==
In the 2021 Census of Population conducted by Statistics Canada, Clermont had a population of 3,065 living in 1,429 of its 1,490 total private dwellings, a change of −0.6% from its 2016 population of 3,085. With a land area of 51.53 km^{2} (19.90 sq mi), it had a population density of 59.5/km^{2} (154.1/sq mi) in 2021.

Historical Census Data - Clermont (Capitale-Nationale), Quebec

Year	Pop.	±%
1941	1,318	—
1951	2,027	+53.8%
1956	2,628	+29.6%
1961	3,114	+18.5%
1966	3,175	+2.0%
1971	3,386	+6.6%

Year	Pop.	±%
1976	3,518	+3.9%
1981	3,621	+2.9%
1986	3,426	−5.4%
1991	3,385	−1.2%
1996	3,225	−4.7%
2001	3,078	−4.6%

Year	Pop.	±%
2006	3,041	−1.2%
2011	3,118	+2.5%
2016	3,085	−1.1%
2021	3,065	−0.6%

Source: Statistics Canada

Mother tongue (2021):

- English as first language: 0.2%
- French as first language: 99.3%
- English and French as first language: 0.2%
- Other as first language: 0.3%

== Economy ==
Clermont's economy centres on the Abitibi-Bowater paper mill, formerly the Donohue mill that was founded in 1936 by the brothers Timothy and Charles Donohue and employed close to a thousand people in the 1970s.

Clermont is also the end of the Charlevoix Railway and therefore is an intermodal freight transport hub primarily for wood.

== Attractions ==
The location of the city of Clermont makes it conducive to outdoor activities of all kinds. First, the fishermen are pampered because of the presence of a salmon river; the Malbaie River. Moreover, this river is the central point of various activities including the Festival of Fishing . Other outdoor activities are also feasible such as hiking. An ice hockey arena is available for ice hockey and ice skating enthusiasts. The city of Clermont also hosts the Boomerang Charlevoix, a team of the Hockey League Beauce-Bellechasse-Frontenac.

=== Charlevoix impact structure ===
The Charlevoix impact structure in which the city of Clermont is located is a meteorite impact structure of 56 kilometres (35 mi) created 350 million years ago by the impact of a meteorite of 2 kilometres (1.2 mi) in diameter. In July and August, from Baie Saint-Paul, it is possible to participate daily in guided tours of the impact structure organized by a non-profit scientific organization. These visits reveal the geology of the region, the origin of the impact structure, the human developments made possible by the impact structure and the region's diverse flora, which is also the result of the presence of the impact structure. During the rest of the year, the same visits are organized on request.

=== Monument Alexis Lapointe (known as "The Trotter") ===
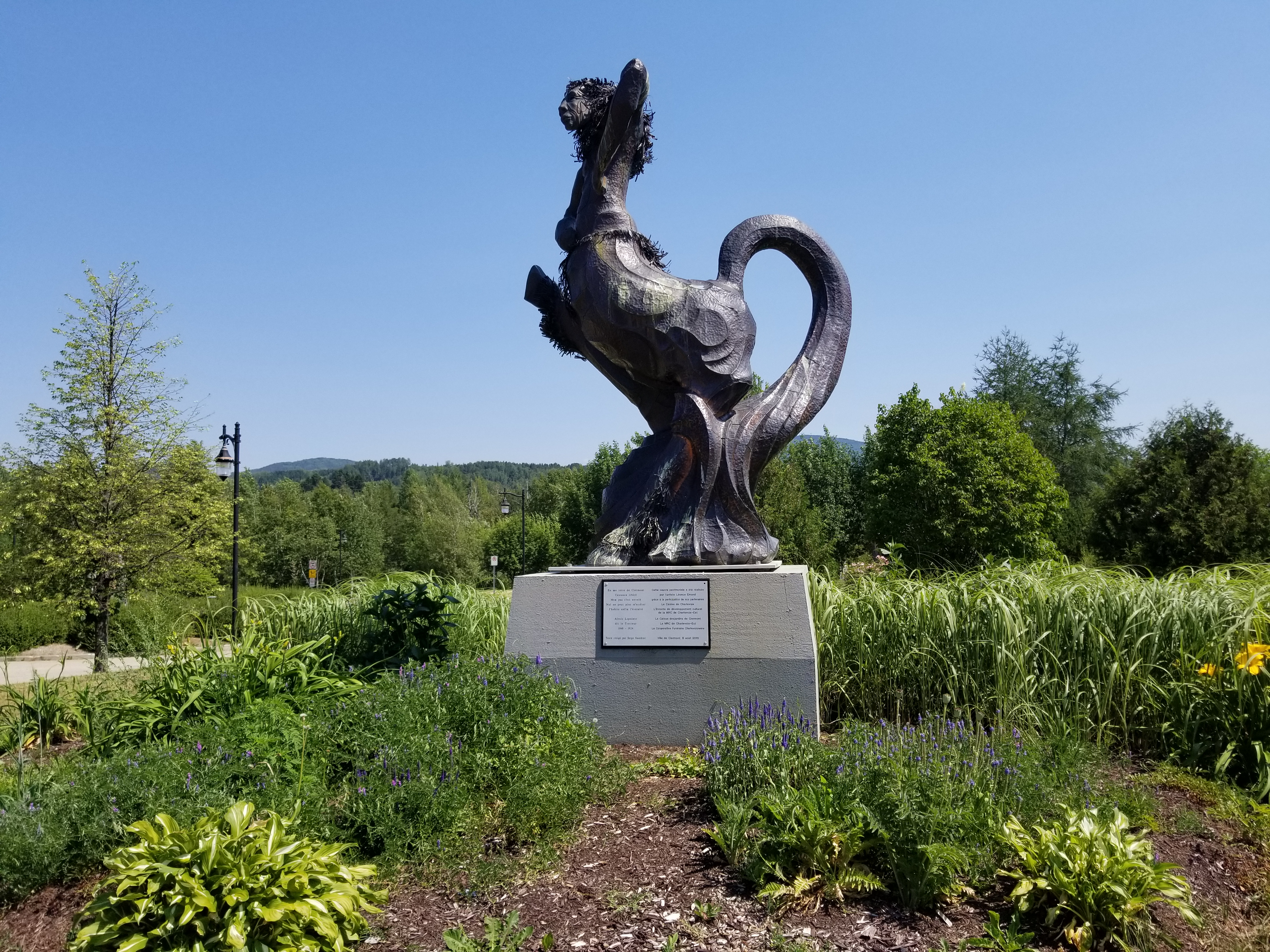
Image of the Monument erected in honor of Alexis Lapointe (1860-1924) at Des Berges Municipal Park in Clermont, QC, was renowned for being one of the greatest runners of his day.

The August 8, 2010, a monument of the artist Léonce Émond was inaugurated at the Des Berges City Park of Clermont, near the Malbaie River, to evoke the memory of Alexis Lapointe (known as "The Trotter") (1860-1924 ). The latter was reputed to be one of the greatest runners of his time.

=== Malbaie River ===
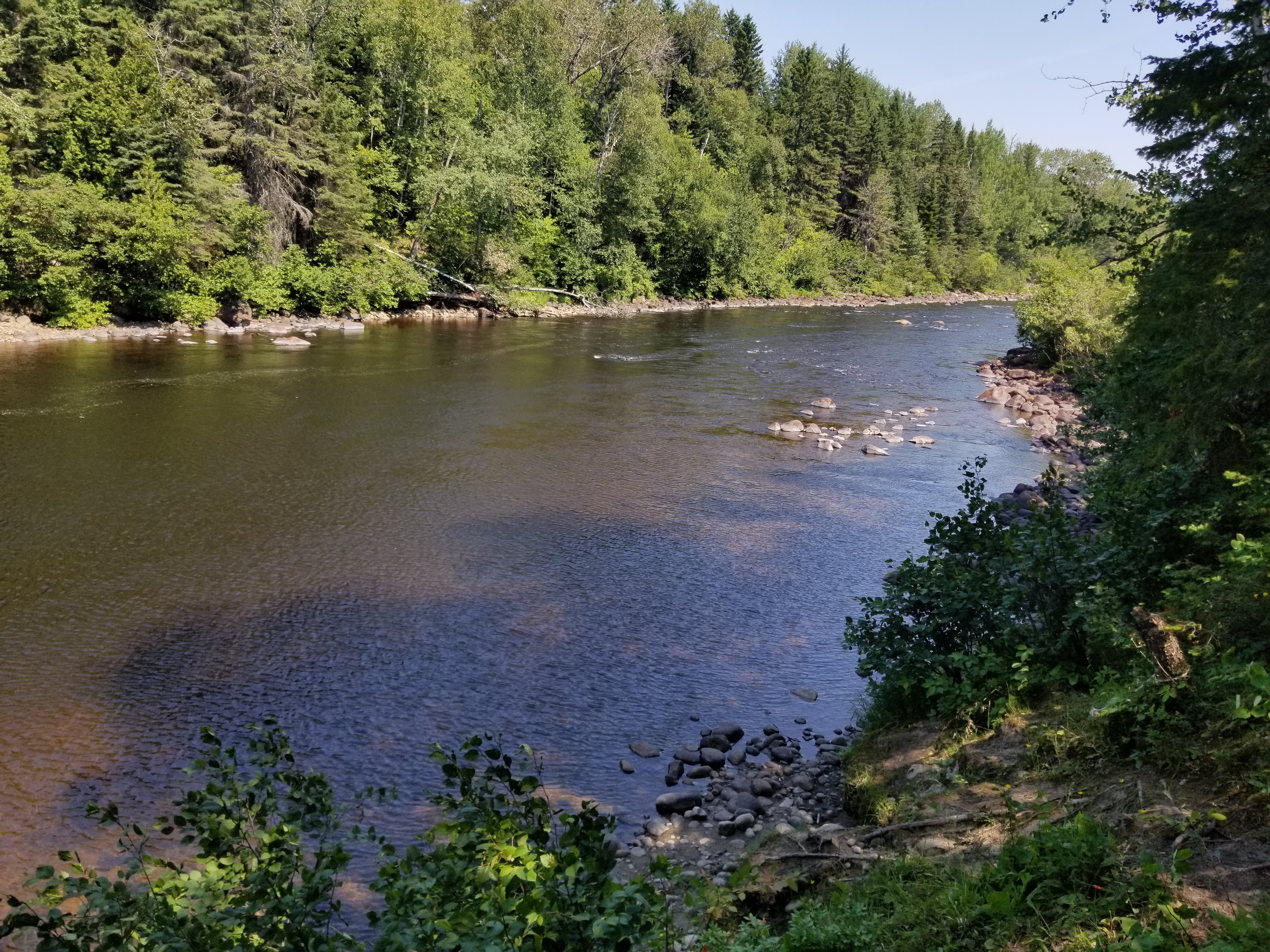
The bottom of the Malbaie River is rocky and generally shallow. This river is conducive for the recovery of several species of fish including salmon and ouaniche It is also conducive to the descent of its course in light craft.

The Malbaie River, which crosses the city of Clermont towards the South, is a great attraction for recreational tourism activities, such as salmon fishing or landlocked salmon. A bike path generally in wooded area runs along the west bank of the Malbaie River passing in particular in the municipal park Des Berges, bypassing some small bodies of water and the water treatment center, to the bridge spanning the river.

== See also ==
- Malbaie River, a watercourse
- Signole River, a watercourse
- Jacob River, a watercourse
- List of cities in Quebec
