= Charlevoix-Est Regional County Municipality =

Charlevoix-Est
- Regional county municipality
- Coordinates: 47°44′N 69°59′W
- Country: Canada
- Province: Quebec
- Region: Capitale-Nationale
- Effective: January 1, 1982
- County seat: Clermont

Government
  - Type: Prefecture
  - Prefect: Bernard Maltais

Area
  - Total: 2,994.68 km^{2} (1,156.25 sq mi)
  - Land: 2,288.97 km^{2} (883.78 sq mi)

Population (2021)
  - Total: 15,409
  - Density: 6.7/km^{2} (17/sq mi)
  - Change (2016-21): ▼0.6%
  - Dwellings: 8,664
- Time zone: UTC−5 (EST)
  - Summer (DST): UTC−4 (EDT)
- Area codes: 418 and 581
- Website: mrccharlevoixest.ca

Charlevoix-Est (French pronunciation: [ʃaʁləvwa ɛst]) is a regional county municipality in the Capitale-Nationale region of Quebec, Canada. The seat is Clermont.

== Subdivisions ==
There are 9 subdivisions within the RCM:

Cities & Towns (2)

- Clermont
- La Malbaie

Municipalities (5)

- Baie-Sainte-Catherine
- Notre-Dame-des-Monts
- Saint-Aimé-des-Lacs
- Saint-Irénée
- Saint-Siméon

Unorganized Territory (2)

- Mont-Élie
- Sagard

== Demographics ==
=== Population ===
Canada census – Charlevoix-Est community profile

	2021	2016	2011
Population	15,409 (-0.6% from 2016)	15,509 (-4.5% from 2011)	16,240 (-0.8% from 2006)
Land area	2,288.97 km^{2} (883.78 sq mi)	2,307.23 km^{2} (890.83 sq mi)	2,305.84 km^{2} (890.29 sq mi)
Population density	6.7/km^{2} (17/sq mi)	6.7/km^{2} (17/sq mi)	7.0/km^{2} (18/sq mi)
Median age	54.4 (M: 53.6, F: 55.2)	51.7 (M: 51.0, F: 52.5)	48.9 (M: 48.2, F: 49.7)
Private dwellings	8,664 (total) 7,138 (occupied)	8,707 (total) 6,980 (occupied)	8,606 (total)
Median household income	$64,500	$55,727	$50,043

References: 2021 2016 2011

Historical Census Data - Charlevoix-Est Regional County Municipality, Quebec

Year	Pop.	±%
1991	17,413	—
1996	16,941	−2.7%
2001	16,624	−1.9%
2006	16,372	−1.5%

Year	Pop.	±%
2011	16,240	−0.8%
2016	15,509	−4.5%
2021	15,409	−0.6%

Source: Statistics Canada

=== Language ===
Canada Census Mother Tongue - Charlevoix-Est Regional County Municipality, Quebec
Census	Total	French			English			French & English			Other		
Year	Responses	Count	Trend	Pop %	Count	Trend	Pop %	Count	Trend	Pop %	Count	Trend	Pop %
2016	15,295	15,105	▼4.8%	98.76%	75	▼11.8%	0.49%	30	▼14.3%	0.20%	85	▲88.9%	0.56%
2011	16,025	15,860	▼0.6%	98.97%	85	▲54.5%	0.53%	35	▲250.0%	0.22%	45	▼71.0%	0.28%
2006	16,170	15,950	▼1.8%	98.64%	55	▼35.3%	0.34%	10	▼71.4%	0.06%	155	▲1450.0%	0.96%
2001	16,380	16,250	▼1.8%	99.21%	85	▼32.0%	0.52%	35	▼22.2%	0.21%	10	▼75.0%	0.06%
1996	16,750	16,540	n/a	98.75%	125	n/a	0.75%	45	n/a	0.27%	40	n/a	0.24%

== Transportation ==
=== Access Routes ===
Highways and numbered routes that run through the municipality, including external routes that start or finish at the county border:

- Autoroutes
  - None
- Principal Highways
  - R-138
  - R-170
- Secondary Highways
  - R-362
- External Routes
  - None

== See also ==
- List of regional county municipalities and equivalent territories in Quebec
