= Petite rivière Savane =

River in La Côte-de-Beaupré Regional County Municipality, Quebec, Canada

Petite rivière Savane Old name: Petite rivière de la Savane (French) and Rivière de la Savane (French)
- Location within Quebec

Location
- Country: Canada
- Province: Quebec
- Region: Capitale-Nationale
- Regional County Municipality: La Côte-de-Beaupré Regional County Municipality
- Municipality: Lac-Jacques-Cartier, Saint-Ferréol-les-Neiges

Physical characteristics
- Source: Confluence of three mountain streams
  - location: Lac-Jacques-Cartier
  - coordinates: 47°14′21″N 70°56′56″W
  - elevation: 753 m
- Mouth: Sainte-Anne River (Beaupré)
  - location: Lac-Jacques-Cartier
  - coordinates: 47°17′38″N 70°45′05″W
  - elevation: 324 m
- Length: 101 km (63 mi)

Basin features
- Tributaries
  - left: (Upward from the mouth) Three unidentified streams.
  - right: (Upward from the mouth) Three unidentified streams, discharge from an unidentified lake.

The Petite rivière Savane (English: Little Savannah River) is a tributary of the Sainte-Anne River, flowing on the north bank of the Saint Lawrence River, in the territory unorganized from Lac-Jacques-Cartier, in the La Côte-de-Beaupré Regional County Municipality, in the administrative region of Capitale-Nationale, in the province of Quebec, in Canada.

This small valley is served on each side of the river by various forest roads. Forestry is the main economic activity in this valley; recreational tourism, second.

The surface of the Petite Savane River is generally frozen from the beginning of December until the end of March; however, safe traffic on the ice is generally from mid-December to mid-March. The upper part has a freezing period of about an additional week. The water level of the river varies with the seasons and the precipitation; the spring flood occurs in March or April.

== Geography ==
The Petite Rivière Savane rises at the confluence of three mountain streams, on the west side of Mont Bleu, in the unorganized territory of Lac-Jacques-Cartier. This source of the eastern flank of Mont Raoul-Blanchard, is located at:

- 2.6 kilometres (1.6 mi) east of the course of the Brûlée River;
- 0.7 kilometres (0.43 mi) south-east of the summit of Mont Raoul-Blanchard (altitude: 1,159 metres (3,802 ft));
- 2.6 kilometres (1.6 mi) south-west of the summit of Mont Bleu (altitude: 1,150 metres (3,770 ft));
- 5.9 kilometres (3.7 mi) south-west of the mouth of the Petite rivière Savane.

The course of this river bypasses Mont Bleu from the north. From its source, the course of this river descends on 10.1 kilometres (6.3 mi) bypassing Mont Bleu by the north, with a drop of 822 metres (2,697 ft), according to the segments following:

- 27 kilometres (17 mi) first towards the east, then towards the northeast by crossing an unidentified lake (length: 0.8 kilometres (0.50 mi); altitude: 1,040 metres (3,410 ft)) enclosed between the mountains, to its mouth;
- 35 kilometres (22 mi) towards the north-east with a drop of 289 metres (948 ft), bending towards the south-east bypassing Mont Bleu by the north, until a stream (coming from the northwest), ie on the south side of the mountain in Albert;
- 3.6 kilometres (2.2 mi) towards the south-east with a drop of 113 metres (371 ft) by forming a small hook towards the north-east to go and collect a stream (coming from the north), to its mouth.

The Petite rivière Savane flows on the southwest shore of the Sainte-Anne River (Beaupré), in the unorganized territory of Lac-Jacques-Cartier, facing the northern limit of Saint-Tite-des-Caps. This confluence is located 12.7 kilometres (7.9 mi) west of the northwest shore of the St. Lawrence River, 13.9 kilometres (8.6 mi) south west of the village center of Petite-Rivière-Saint-François and 16.9 kilometres (10.5 mi) north of the village center of Saint-Tite-des-Caps.

From the confluence of the Petite Savane River, the current flows over 36.9 kilometres (22.9 mi) generally towards the southwest by the course of the Sainte-Rivière Anne, which crosses downtown Beaupré, to the northwest shore of the Saint Lawrence River.

== Toponymy ==
The toponym "Petite rivière Savane" was formalized on March 25, 1997 at the Place Names Bank of the Commission de toponymie du Québec.

== See also ==
- Capitale-Nationale, an administrative region
- La Côte-de-Beaupré Regional County Municipality
- Lac-Jacques-Cartier, an unorganized territory
- Sainte-Anne River (Beaupré)
- St. Lawrence River
- List of rivers of Quebec
