= Rivière des Roches (Sainte-Anne River tributary) =

River in La Côte-de-Beaupré Regional County Municipality, Quebec, Canada

- Location within Quebec

Location
- Country: Canada
- Province: Quebec
- Region: Capitale-Nationale
- Regional County Municipality: La Côte-de-Beaupré Regional County Municipality
- Municipality: Lac-Jacques-Cartier, Saint-Ferréol-les-Neiges

Physical characteristics
- Source: Little mountain lake
  - location: Lac-Jacques-Cartier
  - coordinates: 47°11′13″N 70°52′12″W
  - elevation: 474 m
- Mouth: Sainte-Anne River (Beaupré)
  - location: Saint-Ferréol-les-Neiges
  - coordinates: 47°07′15″N 70°50′07″W
  - elevation: 161 m
- Length: 112 km (70 mi)

Basin features
- Tributaries
  - left: (Upward from the mouth) Unidentified stream, outlet (coming from the east) from Lac de la Colline, outlet from an unidentified small lake, outlet from two small lakes.
  - right: (Upward from the mouth) Prairie stream, Saint-Nicolas stream, discharge from an unidentified lake, discharge from Lac des Trois Castors, mountain stream.

The Rivière des Roches (English: River of rocks) is a tributary of the west bank of the Sainte-Anne River, on the north bank of the Saint Lawrence River. This river flows in the unorganized territory of Lac-Jacques-Cartier and in the municipality of Saint-Ferréol-les-Neiges, in the La Côte-de-Beaupré Regional County Municipality, in the administrative region of Capitale-Nationale, in the province of Quebec, in Canada.

The upper part of this valley is mainly served by the rang Saint-Nicolas road which passes on the northeast side. The lower part is served by avenue Royale and by the chemin du rang Saint-Nicolas which passes on the southwest side. Forestry is the main economic activity in this valley; recreational tourism activities, second; agriculture, third.

The surface of the Rivière des Roches is generally frozen from the beginning of December until the end of March; however, safe traffic on the ice is generally from mid-December to mid-March. The water level of the river varies with the seasons and the precipitation; the spring flood occurs in March or April.

== Geography ==
The Rivière des Roches rises at the confluence of three mountain streams, on the west side of Mont Bleu, in the unorganized territory of Lac-Jacques-Cartier. This source of the eastern flank of Mont Raoul-Blanchard, is located at:

- 14.3 kilometres (8.9 mi) west of the northwest shore of the St. Lawrence River;
- 8.9 kilometres (5.5 mi) west of Saint-Tite-des-Caps town center;
- 4.2 kilometres (2.6 mi) south-west of a curve in the course of the Sainte-Anne River;
- 7.8 kilometres (4.8 mi) north-west of the mouth of the Roches river.

From its source, the course of this river descends on 11.2 kilometres (7.0 mi), with a drop of 313 metres (1,027 ft), according to the following segments:

- 3.3 kilometres (2.1 mi) south-east, up to the outlet (coming from the south) of Lac des Trois Castors;
- 1.1 kilometres (0.68 mi) towards the east by collecting the discharge (coming from the south) of a lake surrounded by resort, until the discharge (coming from the north) of two small lakes;
- 1.9 kilometres (1.2 mi) to the south, forming a large W at the start of the segment and collecting the discharge (coming from the east) from a small lake, to the Saint-Nicolas stream (coming from the northwest);
- 1.7 kilometres (1.1 mi) to the south by collecting the outlet (coming from the east) from Lac de la Colline, to the Prairies stream (coming from the west);
- 1.3 kilometres (0.81 mi) towards the south-east along the chemin du rang Saint-Nicolas (which passes on the south-west side) and passing under the avenue Royale bridge, until a stream (coming from the north), very close (upstream) to a bend in the river;
- 1.9 kilometres (1.2 mi) towards the south in an increasingly deep valley with a drop of 91 metres (299 ft) by forming a loop towards the east, until its mouth.

The Roches river flows on the west bank of the Sainte-Anne River (Beaupré), in the municipality of Saint-Ferréol-les-Neiges, at 0.6 kilometres (0.37 mi) downstream of Les Sept Chutes. This confluence is located 6.8 kilometres (4.2 mi) northwest of the northwest shore of the St. Lawrence River, 9.4 kilometres (5.8 mi) north from the mouth of the Sainte-Anne river and 5.3 kilometres (3.3 mi) south-west of the village center of Saint-Tite-des-Caps.

From the confluence of the "rivière des Roches", the current flows over 11.0 kilometres (6.8 mi) generally towards the southwest by the course of the Sainte-Anne River, which crosses downtown Beaupré, to the northwest shore of the Saint Lawrence River.

== Toponymy ==
In 1815, the geographer Joseph Bouchette listed the main rivers in the seigneury of Côte-de-Beaupré, including "La Rivière Ste. Anne, who receives the small Rivers at the Rose and the Rocks". The origin of the toponymic designation "Rivière des Roches" derives from the nature of the bottom of the river where many rocks disturb its course. The center of the hamlet designated "Rivière-des-Roches" is located in Saint-Ferréol-les-Neiges, about 2 km from the mouth of the river, at the level of avenue Royale and the Roches river. The post office which served this hamlet from 1907 to 1954 also bore this name.

At the beginning of the 19th century, a group of citizens and religious leaders thought of building a church in the hamlet of Rivière-des-Roches, near the site of an old butter factory. The Séminaire de Québec had even donated land for this purpose, from the farm it operated in Rivière-des-Roches, but the construction project never came to fruition. Nowadays, the Rivière des Roches welcomes holidaymakers on its banks. There are three other watercourses officially named Rivière des Roches, including two from the very region of Quebec, located at Saint-Augustin-de-Desmaures and Charlesbourg.

The toponym "Rivière des Roches" was formalized on December 5, 1968 at the Place Names Bank of the Commission de toponymie du Québec.

== See also ==
- Capitale-Nationale, an administrative region
- La Côte-de-Beaupré Regional County Municipality
- Lac-Jacques-Cartier, an unorganized territory
- Saint-Ferréol-les-Neiges, a municipality
- Sainte-Anne River (Beaupré)
- St. Lawrence River
- List of rivers of Quebec
