= Rivière des Chenaux =

River in Charlevoix and La Côte-de-Beaupré, Quebec, Canada

- Location within Quebec

Location
- Country: Canada
- Province: Quebec
- Region: Capitale-Nationale
- Regional County Municipality: La Côte-de-Beaupré Regional County Municipality
- Municipality: Petite-Rivière-Saint-François and Saint-Tite-des-Caps

Physical characteristics
- Source: Unidentified lake
  - location: Petite-Rivière-Saint-François
  - coordinates: 47°18′00″N 70°41′38″W
  - elevation: 657 m
- Mouth: Lombrette River
  - location: Saint-Tite-des-Caps
  - coordinates: 47°11′05″N 70°44′24″W
  - elevation: 373 m
- Length: 202 km (126 mi)

Basin features
- Tributaries
  - left: (Upward from the mouth) Unidentified stream, unidentified stream (via Lac des Chenaux), discharge from an unidentified lake.
  - right: (Upward from the mouth) Discharge from a small lake, unidentified stream, two unidentified streams (via Lac des Chenaux), discharge from an unidentified lake, discharge from an unidentified lake.

The rivière des Chenaux (English: Channel river) is a tributary of the Lombrette River flowing on the north shore of the St. Lawrence River, in the administrative region of Capitale-Nationale, in the province of Quebec, in Canada. This river flows consecutively through the regional county municipalities (MRC) of:

- Charlevoix Regional County Municipality: in the municipality of Petite-Rivière-Saint-François;
- La Côte-de-Beaupré Regional County Municipality: in the municipality of Saint-Tite-des-Caps.

This small valley is mainly served by the Route 138 which normally runs along the north shore of the St. Lawrence River; however, it distances itself from the river in this area of Charlevoix. The route 360 serves the lower part. Forestry is the main economic activity in this valley; second-hand tourist activities.

The surface of the Chenaux River is generally frozen from the beginning of December until the end of March; however, safe traffic on the ice is generally from mid-December to mid-March. The water level of the river varies with the seasons and the precipitation; the spring flood occurs in March or April.

== Geography ==
The Chenaux River rises in Petite-Rivière-Saint-François at the mouth of Lac Fortin (length: 0.9 kilometres (0.56 mi); altitude of 657 metres (2,156 ft)). This small lake between the mountains is located south of Lac Gagné and southwest of Lac la Flippe at:

- 9.5 kilometres (5.9 mi) east of the west bank of the St. Lawrence River;
- 9.5 kilometres (5.9 mi) south-west of the center of the village of Petite-Rivière-Saint-François;
- 18.5 kilometres (11.5 mi) north of the village center of Saint-Tite-des-Caps;
- 67 kilometres (42 mi) northeast of downtown Quebec.

From the mouth of Lake Fortin, the course of the rivière des Chenaux descends with a drop of 284 metres (932 ft) over 20.2 kilometres (12.6 mi) especially in the forest area and parallel to the edge of the Laurentian plateau, 4 to 5 km away, according to the following segments:

- 0.5 kilometres (0.31 mi) south, to the outlet (from the west) of a small lake;
- 2.8 kilometres (1.7 mi) towards the south-east by forming numerous small snakes in places, up to the outlet (coming from the south-east) of a lake;
- 12 kilometres (7.5 mi) first towards the west, then towards the south, until the outlet (coming from the west) of a small lake;
- 6.8 kilometres (4.2 mi) to the south, forming a hook towards the west at the end of the segment and crossing Lac des Chenaux (length: 0.7 kilometres (0.43 mi); altitude: 505 metres (1,657 ft)), up to its mouth;
- 2.6 kilometres (1.6 mi) to the south, branching off mid-segment east, to a stream (coming from the north);
- 32 kilometres (20 mi) to the south in the forest zone, while winding in places, until the outlet of the unidentified stream (coming from the west);
- 31 kilometres (19 mi) first towards the east, then towards the south-east in the agricultural and forestry zone by crossing the route 360, until its mouth.

The Chenaux River flows on the west bank of the Lombrette River, in Saint-Tite-des-Caps, in an area near Domaine-Lombrette, between route 360 and route 138. This confluence is located at:

- 5.6 kilometres (3.5 mi) east of the west bank of the St. Lawrence River;
- 4.5 kilometres (2.8 mi) north of the village center of Saint-Tite-des-Caps;
- 19.6 kilometres (12.2 mi) south-west of the center of the village of Petite-Rivière-Saint-François;
- 53.9 kilometres (33.5 mi) northeast of downtown Quebec.

From the mouth of the Chenaux River, the current descends on 9.4 kilometres (5.8 mi) southwards the course of the Lombrette River, then on 140 kilometres (87 mi) generally south by the course of the Sainte-Anne River, to the northwest shore of the Saint-Laurent River.

== Toponymy ==
The toponym "rivière des Chenaux" was formalized on December 5, 1968 at the Place Names Bank of the Commission de toponymie du Québec.

== See also ==
- Capitale-Nationale, an administrative region
- Charlevoix Regional County Municipality
- La Côte-de-Beaupré Regional County Municipality
- Petite-Rivière-Saint-François, a municipality
- Saint-Tite-des-Caps, a municipality
- Lombrette River
- Sainte-Anne River (Beaupré)
- St. Lawrence River
- List of rivers of Quebec
