= Rivière du Mont Saint-Étienne =

River in La Côte-de-Beaupré Regional County Municipality, Quebec, Canada

- Location within Quebec

Location
- Country: Canada
- Province: Quebec
- Region: Capitale-Nationale
- Regional County Municipality: La Côte-de-Beaupré Regional County Municipality
- Municipality: Lac-Jacques-Cartier, Saint-Ferréol-les-Neiges

Physical characteristics
- Source: Deuxième lac Lunch
  - location: Lac-Jacques-Cartier
  - coordinates: 47°14′21″N 70°56′56″W
  - elevation: 753 m
- Mouth: Sainte-Anne River (Beaupré)
  - location: Saint-Ferréol-les-Neiges
  - coordinates: 47°11′03″N 70°48′36″W
  - elevation: 324 m
- Length: 180 km (110 mi)

Basin features
- Tributaries
  - left: (Upward from the mouth) Discharge from an unidentified lake, unidentified stream, discharge from an unidentified lake, three unidentified streams.
  - right: (Upward from the mouth) Three unidentified streams, Southwest Arm of the Rivière du Mont Saint-Étienne, five unidentified streams, outlet of Lac Coeur, unidentified stream, stream (via Second Lynch Lake).

The rivière du Mont Saint-Étienne (English: Mont Saint-Etienne river) is a tributary of the Sainte-Anne river, flowing on the north bank of the Saint Lawrence River, in the unorganized territory of Lac-Jacques-Cartier and the municipality of Saint-Ferréol-les-Neiges, in the La Côte-de-Beaupré Regional County Municipality, in the administrative region of Capitale-Nationale, in the province of Quebec, in Canada.

The lower part of this small valley is served by chemin de l'Abitibi-Price, chemin du rang Saint-Marie and chemin Clairval. Chemin du rang Saint-Édouard runs southwest of the middle part of the river course. The upper part is served by a secondary forest road passing on the north side of the river and which connects to the southeast with the Abitibi-Price road. Forestry is the main economic activity in this valley; recreational tourism, second.

The surface of the lower part of the Mont Saint-Étienne river is generally frozen from the beginning of December until the end of March; however, safe traffic on the ice is generally from mid-December to mid-March. The upper part has a freezing period of about an additional week. The water level of the river varies with the seasons and the precipitation; the spring flood occurs in March or April.

== Geography ==
The Mont Saint-Étienne river rises at the mouth of second Lynch Lake, on the northwest side of Mont Saint-Étienne, in the unorganized territory of Lac-Jacques-Cartier. This lake wedged between the mountains has two outlets: one flows west descending towards the rivière du Camp Brûlé passing through First Lynch Lake; the other east along the Mont Saint-Étienne river. This second mouth of the lake (East side) is located at:

- 1.3 kilometres (0.81 mi) south-east of the course of the rivière du Camp Brûlé;
- 1.9 kilometres (1.2 mi) north of the top of a mountain (altitude: 1,040 metres (3,410 ft));
- 1.1 kilometres (0.68 mi) south of another mountain peak (altitude: 932 metres (3,058 ft));
- 30 kilometres (19 mi) at south-West of the summit of Saint-Étienne Mountain (altitude: 980 metres (3,220 ft));
- 12.2 kilometres (7.6 mi) west of the mouth of Mont Saint-Étienne.

This river bypasses Mont Saint-Étienne. From this source, the course of this river descends on 18.0 kilometres (11.2 mi), with a drop of 429 metres (1,407 ft), according to the following segments:

- 3.2 kilometres (2.0 mi) towards the northeast in particular by crossing a first lake, then crossing Lake Mont Saint-Étienne (length: 1.3 kilometres (0.81 mi); altitude : 747 metres (2,451 ft)) over its full length, up to the dam at its mouth;
- 1.8 kilometres (1.1 mi) towards the south-east with a drop of 117 metres (384 ft) in a deep valley, until the discharge (coming from the south-west) of two lakes including Lac Coeur;
- 4.5 kilometres (2.8 mi) towards the east with a drop of 150 metres (490 ft) by forming a hook of 05 kilometres (3.1 mi) towards the south, up to the outlet (coming from the north) of an unidentified lake;
- 2.9 kilometres (1.8 mi) towards the south-east by forming a loop towards the south-west and collecting a stream (coming from the north-east), up to the South-West Arm of the Rivière du Mont Saint-Etienne (coming from the southwest);
- 2.4 kilometres (1.5 mi) towards the south-east by forming a curve towards the west and collecting a stream (coming from the west), up to a stream (coming from the north);
- 2.0 kilometres (1.2 mi) towards the east by forming a curve towards the south, up to the chemin du rang Sainte-Marie;
- 1.2 kilometres (0.75 mi) north-east passing under the bridge of Chemin de l'Abitibi-Price, to its mouth.

The Mont Saint-Étienne river flows on the southwest bank of the Sainte-Anne River (Beaupré), in Saint-Ferréol-les-Neiges. This confluence is located 2.1 kilometres (1.3 mi) upstream of the route 360 bridge and 6.2 kilometres (3.9 mi) downstream of the confluence of the Brûlée River.

From the confluence of the Mont Saint-Étienne river, the current flows over 21.3 kilometres (13.2 mi) generally towards the southwest by the course of the Sainte-Anne River, crossing downtown Beaupré, to the northwest shore of Saint Lawrence River.

== Toponymy ==
The toponym "rivière du Mont Saint-Étienne" was formalized on December 5, 1968, at the Place Names Bank of the Commission de toponymie du Québec.

== See also ==
- Capitale-Nationale, an administrative region
- La Côte-de-Beaupré Regional County Municipality
- Lac-Jacques-Cartier, an unorganized territory
- Saint-Ferréol-les-Neiges, a municipality
- Sainte-Anne River (Beaupré)
- St. Lawrence River
- List of rivers of Quebec
