= La Flippe Lake =

Lake in Quebec, Canada

- Location in Quebec
- Location: Baie-Saint-Paul, Charlevoix Regional County Municipality (MRC), Capitale-Nationale, Quebec, Canada
- Coordinates: 47.30917°N 70.67194°W
- Lake type: Natural
- Primary inflows: Four streams
- Primary outflows: Bras du Nord-Ouest (Gouffre River tributary)
- Basin countries: Canada
- Max. length: 1.4 km (0.87 mi)
- Max. width: 0.6 km (0.37 mi)
- Surface elevation: 684 m (2,244 ft)

La Flippe Lake (Lac La Flippe) is a body of fresh water located in the territory of the town of Baie-Saint-Paul, in the Charlevoix Regional County Municipality, in the administrative region of Capitale-Nationale, in the province of Quebec, in Canada .

Lac La Flippe constitutes the head water of the Bras du Nord-Ouest. This lake embedded between two mountains is entirely located in an area where forestry has always been the predominant economic activity. In the middle of the 19th century, recreational tourism activities took off. This lake is normally frozen from the beginning of December until the beginning of April; however, safe circulation on the ice is generally done from mid-December to the end of March.

Secondary forest roads connected to the east at route 138 serve the eastern part of the hydrographic side of Lac La Flippe.

== Geography ==
Located in a forest zone in the territory of Baie-Saint-Paul, La Flippe Lake (length: 1.4 kilometres (0.87 mi); altitude: 684 metres (2,244 ft)) is located on the western slope of the rivière du Gouffre valley and on the northwest bank of the Saint Lawrence River. Lac La Flippe turns out to be the head lake of Bras du Nord-Ouest. This body of water is bordered by marshes on the north and south banks. The mouth of this lake is located at:

- 2.4 kilometres (1.5 mi) north-west of the place called "La Barrière" located along route 138;
- 1.7 kilometres (1.1 mi) west of a mountain peak (altitude: 831 metres (2,726 ft));
- 7.6 kilometres (4.7 mi) south-west of the village center of Petite-Rivière-Saint-François;
- 4.3 kilometres (2.7 mi) north-east of a curve of the Sainte-Anne River;
- 19.0 kilometres (11.8 mi) south of the mouth of the Bras du Nord-Ouest (confluence with the Rivière du Gouffre), or in downtown Baie-Saint-Paul;
- 7.8 kilometres (4.8 mi) west of the northwest shore of the St. Lawrence River.

From the mouth of Lac La Flippe, the current follows on 27.7 kilometres (17.2 mi) the course of Bras du Nord-Ouest; then on 3.2 kilometres (2.0 mi) with a drop in level of 6 metres (20 ft) following the course of the Rivière du Gouffre which flows into Baie-Saint-Paul in the St. Lawrence River.

== Toponymy ==
A 1996 survey would date the use of this name to at least 1936. Toponymic variants: Lac Lavoie, Lac Laflippe and Lac la Flippe. The name has been in use since at least 1936, along with the variants Lavoie Lake and Laflippe Lake.

The toponym "Lac La Flippe" was formalized on December 5, 1968 at the Place Names Bank of the Commission de toponymie du Québec.

== Related articles ==
- Charlevoix Regional County Municipality
- Baie-Saint-Paul, an unorganized territory
- Rivière du Gouffre
