= Brûlé River (Sainte-Anne River tributary) =

River in La Côte-de-Beaupré Regional County Municipality, Quebec, Canada

- Location within Quebec

Location
- Country: Canada
- Province: Quebec
- Region: Capitale-Nationale
- Regional County Municipality: La Côte-de-Beaupré Regional County Municipality
- Municipality: Lac-Jacques-Cartier

Physical characteristics
- Source: Fourchu lake
  - location: Lac-Jacques-Cartier
  - coordinates: 47°20′02″N 70°54′26″W
  - elevation: 806 m
- Mouth: Sainte-Anne River (Beaupré)
  - location: Lac-Jacques-Cartier
  - coordinates: 47°13′39″N 70°48′50″W
  - elevation: 370 m
- Length: 201 km (125 mi)

Basin features
- Tributaries
  - left: (Upward from the mouth) Three unidentified streams, Lac de la Tour outlet, Caribou lake outlet.
  - right: (Upward from the mouth) Small unidentified stream, outlet of Lac Janot, outlet of Lac Brûlé.

The Rivière Brûlé is a tributary of the Sainte-Anne River, flowing on the north bank of the Saint Lawrence River, in the non-territory organized from Lac-Jacques-Cartier, in the La Côte-de-Beaupré Regional County Municipality, in the administrative region of Capitale-Nationale, in the province of Quebec, in Canada.

The southern part of this small valley is served on each side of the river by various forest roads. The upper part is served by a forest road which passes on the north side of the river. Forestry is the main economic activity in this valley; recreational tourism, second.

The surface of the Brûlé River is generally frozen from the beginning of December until the end of March; however, safe traffic on the ice is generally from mid-December to mid-March. The upper part has a freezing period of about an additional week. The water level of the river varies with the seasons and the precipitation; the spring flood occurs in March or April.

== Geography ==
The Brûlé River takes its source at the confluence of Lake Fourchu, in the unorganized territory of Lac-Jacques-Cartier. This lake has a marsh area on the west side and a high cliff on the north side and on the south side. The mouth of this lake is located at:

- 4.6 kilometres (2.9 mi) east of the course of the Savane River;
- 6.3 kilometres (3.9 mi) west of the summit of Mont Raoul-Blanchard (altitude: 1,159 metres (3,802 ft));
- 5.8 kilometres (3.6 mi) northwest of the summit of Mont Bleu (altitude: 1,150 metres (3,770 ft));
- 13.8 kilometres (8.6 mi) north-west of the mouth of the Brûlé river.

From the mouth of Lac Fourchu, the course of the Brûlé river descends on 20.1 kilometres (12.5 mi), with a drop of 436 metres (1,430 ft), according to the following segments:

- 15 kilometres (9.3 mi) east to the outlet (coming from the south) of Lac Brûlé;
- 3.0 kilometres (1.9 mi) to the east in a deep valley, up to a bend in the river;
- 64 kilometres (40 mi) to the south in a deep valley passing on the west side of Mont Raoul-Blanchard and Brûlé mountain, then bending east to end in a small valley, until at the outlet (coming from the west) of Lac Janot;
- 7.1 kilometres (4.4 mi) towards the south-east with a drop of 99 metres (325 ft), forming some serpentines at the end of the segment where the current crosses a long series of rapids, until at a bend in the river;
- 2.1 kilometres (1.3 mi) towards the northeast by crossing several series of rapids, to its mouth.

The Brûlé river flows on the southwest shore of the Sainte-Anne River (Beaupré), in the unorganized territory of Lac-Jacques-Cartier, facing the northern limit of Saint-Tite-des-Caps. This confluence is located 13.1 kilometres (8.1 mi) west of the northwest shore of the St. Lawrence River, 20.5 kilometres (12.7 mi) south west of the village center of Petite-Rivière-Saint-François and 10.0 kilometres (6.2 mi) north-west of the village center of Saint-Tite-des-Caps.

From the confluence of the Brûlé river, the current flows over 27.5 kilometres (17.1 mi) generally towards the southwest by the course of the Sainte-Anne River, which crosses downtown Beaupré, to the northwest shore of the Saint Lawrence River.

== Toponymy ==
Probably born around 1592 in Champigny-sur-Marne in France, Étienne Brûlé became an explorer and an interpreter in the Wendat (Huron) language. He arrived in the colony at the same time as Samuel de Champlain, with whom he enlisted in 1608. Brûlé was possibly the first European to have entered Huronia. He explored several territories including Georgian Bay and Lakes Huron, Ontario, Superior and Erie, where he traded furs for the French. During the illegal capture of Quebec by the Kirke brothers in 1629, in a context of war between England and France, Étienne Brulé went to the service of the English. Finally, the Treaty of Saint-Germain-en-Laye put an end to the conflict by restoring New France to France, in 1632. Samuel de Champlain returned to the colony and accuses Étienne Brûlé of treason in these terms: "Here are those who betrayed their Roy & sold their homeland[…]". Étienne Brulé then took refuge in Huronia where he was killed, in the year 1633.

The toponym "Rivière Brûlé" was formalized on December 13, 1996 at the Place Names Bank of the Commission de toponymie du Québec.

== See also ==
- Capitale-Nationale, an administrative region
- La Côte-de-Beaupré Regional County Municipality
- Lac-Jacques-Cartier, an unorganized territory
- Lac Brûlé (Lac-Jacques-Cartier), a body of water
- Sainte-Anne River (Beaupré)
- St. Lawrence River
- List of rivers of Quebec
