= Jean-Larose River =

River in Charlevoix Regional County Municipality, Quebec, Canada

- Location within Quebec

Location
- Country: Canada
- Province: Quebec
- Region: Capitale-Nationale
- Regional County Municipality: La Côte-de-Beaupré Regional County Municipality
- Municipality: Lac-Pikauba, Saint-Ferréol-les-Neiges, Beaupré

Physical characteristics
- Source: Small mountain lake
  - location: Lac-Pikauba
  - coordinates: 47°07′43″N 70°56′43″W
  - elevation: 643 m
- Mouth: Sainte-Anne River (Beaupré)
  - location: Beaupré
  - coordinates: 47°03′43″N 70°53′33″W
  - elevation: 25 m
- Length: 215 km (134 mi)

Basin features
- Tributaries
  - left: Five unidentified stream
  - right: Fifteen unidentified streams

The Jean-Larose River is a tributary of the Sainte-Anne River, flowing on the north bank of the Saint Lawrence River, in the administrative region of Capitale-Nationale, in the province of Quebec, in Canada. This river successively flows through the regional county municipalities (MRC) of:

- Charlevoix Regional County Municipality: in the unorganized territory of Lac-Pikauba;
- La Côte-de-Beaupré Regional County Municipality: in the municipalities of Saint-Ferréol-les-Neiges and Beaupré.

The lower part of this small valley is served by boulevard les Neiges route 360 which goes up the valley first on the west side, then passes on the east side of the river. Chemin du rang Saint-Julien serves the middle section. Recreational activities are the main economic activity in this valley; forestry, second.

The surface of the lower Jean-Larose River is generally frozen from the beginning of December to the end of March; however, safe traffic on the ice is generally from mid-December to mid-March. The upper part has a freezing period of about an additional week. The water level of the river varies with the seasons and the precipitation; the spring flood occurs in March or April.

== Geography ==
The Jean-Larose River rises at the mouth of a small mountain lake northwest of Mont Sainte-Anne, in the unorganized territory of Lac-Pikauba. This source is located at:

- 1.8 kilometres (1.1 mi) east of Saint-Hilaire Lake;
- 2.7 kilometres (1.7 mi) north-west of the summit of Mont Sainte-Anne;
- 8.4 kilometres (5.2 mi) north-west of the mouth of the Jean-Larose river;
- 11.0 kilometres (6.8 mi) north-west of the mouth of the Sainte-Anne River (Beaupré).

This river bypasses Mont Sainte-Anne by crossing the territory of Parc du Mont Saint-Anne. From this source, the course of the Jean-Larose river descends from the Laurentian foothills over 21.5 kilometres (13.4 mi), with a drop of 618 metres (2,028 ft), according to the following segments:

- 0.7 kilometres (0.43 mi) towards the south-east down the mountain, up to a bend in the river;
- 9.2 kilometres (5.7 mi) towards the north-east in a deep valley forming a hook towards the east at the end of the segment, up to a stream (coming from the south);
- 2.8 kilometres (1.7 mi) towards the northeast by forming an S at the start of the segment, then in a curve towards the northwest, up to a bend in the river;
- 23 kilometres (14 mi) towards the south-east, in particular by crossing a zone of rapids, then by bending towards the south, until a brook (coming from the north-west);
- 2.6 kilometres (1.6 mi) to the south, branching south-west at the end of the segment, to the outlet (coming from the west) of a small unidentified lake;
- 2.6 kilometres (1.6 mi) south bypassing Bourg-les-Neiges, crossing a series of rapids on 1.4 kilometres (0.87 mi), then crossing an unidentified lake (length: 0.3 kilometres (0.19 mi); altitude: 160 metres (520 ft)), to the dam at its mouth;
- 13 kilometres (8.1 mi) south-east with a drop of 135 metres (443 ft), to its mouth.

The course of the river follows a stone corridor carved in the shape of a staircase by erosion, generating several falls and series of rapids. At the end of the route, the current drops from a height of 69 m into the Sainte-Anne river through the Jean-Larose falls, also known as "Larose falls". The Jean-Larose river flows on the west bank of a body of water formed by a dam on the Sainte-Anne River (Beaupré), in Beaupré. This confluence is located very close to the dam, which is 2.6 kilometres (1.6 mi) northwest of the confluence of the Sainte-Anne river with the St. Lawrence River and at 270 kilometres (170 mi) north of the bridge leading from Côte-de-Beaupré to Île d'Orléans.

From the confluence of the Jean-Larose river, the current flows over 3.0 kilometres (1.9 mi) generally towards the southwest by the course of the Sainte-Anne river, crossing downtown. Beaupré, to the northwest shore of the St. Lawrence River.

== Toponymy ==
In 1725, a man called Jean Belleau, dit Larose, a censitaire in the seigneury of Gaudarville (near the Cap Rouge river), obtained the concession of land near the falls with his brother Pierre. However, the link between the name of this pioneer and that of the toponym of the river is not established with certainty. In 1769, the Séminaire de Québec, lord of the place, had a flour mill built on its edges; this mill was in operation until its destruction in 1900 by a fire. The toponym "Jean Larose river" has been in use since the 19th century; however, the river had been identified by Joseph Bouchette under the name Rivière à la Rose on his 1815 map.

The toponym "Rivière Jean-Larose" was formalized on December 5, 1968 at the Place Names Bank of the Commission de toponymie du Québec.

== See also ==
- Charlevoix Regional County Municipality
- Lac-Pikauba, an unorganized territory
- Saint-Ferréol-les-Neiges, a municipality
- Beaupré, a municipality
- La Côte-de-Beaupré Regional County Municipality
- Capitale-Nationale, an administrative region
- Sainte-Anne River (Beaupré)
- St. Lawrence River
- List of rivers of Quebec
