= Bras du Nord-Ouest =

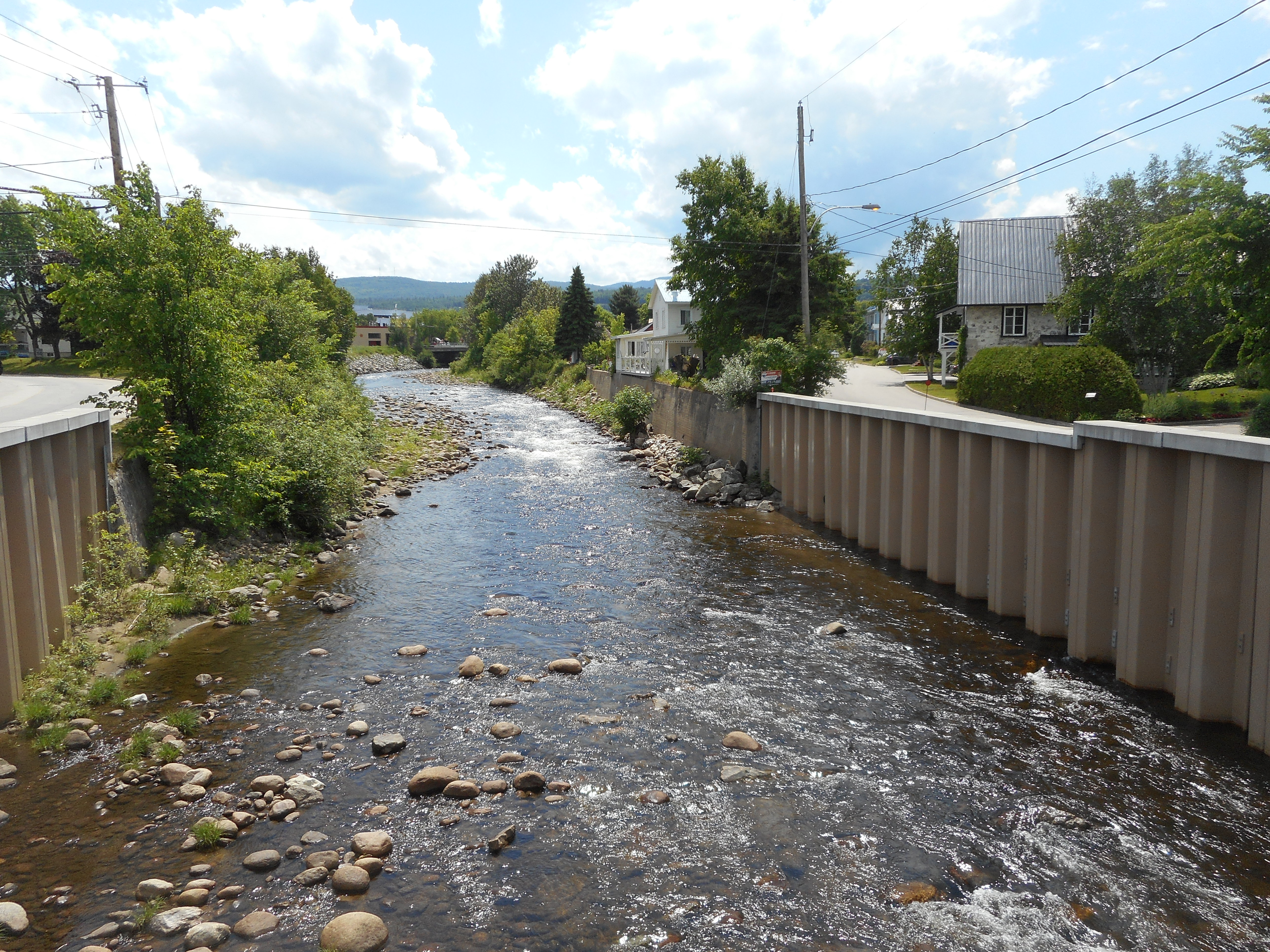

Location
- Country: Canada
- Province: Quebec
- Region: Capitale-Nationale
- Regional County Municipality: Charlevoix Regional County Municipality
- City: Baie-Saint-Paul

Physical characteristics
- Source: La Flippe Lake
  - location: Baie-Saint-Paul
  - coordinates: 47.31525°N 70.66867°W
  - elevation: 684 m (2,244 ft)
- Mouth: Rivière du Gouffre
  - location: Baie-Saint-Paul
  - coordinates: 47.44667°N 70.50723°W
  - elevation: 10 m (33 ft)
- Length: 27.7 km (17.2 mi)

Basin features
- Tributaries
  - left: (from the mouth) Discharge from a lake, five streams, stream from the Moulin, four streams, discharge from a small lake, stream, discharge from a small lake, discharge from two small lakes, rivière à Idas, two streams, discharge Lac à Foin and Lac Tremblay, five streams.
  - right: (from the mouth) Le Petit Bras, Fourteen streams, discharge from an unidentified lake, four streams, discharge from an unidentified lake, four streams, discharge from an unidentified lake, discharge from Lake Larouche.

The Bras du Nord-Ouest is a tributary of the west bank of the lower part of the rivière du Gouffre, flowing entirely in the city of Baie-Saint-Paul, in the Charlevoix Regional County Municipality, in the administrative region of Capitale-Nationale, in the province of Quebec, in Canada.

This valley is mainly served by the route 138 (boulevard de Monseigneur-De Laval) which runs along the foot of Cap de la Mare. Besides the Baie-Saint-Paul residential area, agriculture is the main economic activity in this valley.

The surface of the Northwest Arm is generally frozen from the beginning of December until the beginning of April; however, safe circulation on the ice is generally done from mid-December to the end of March. The water level of the river varies with the seasons and the precipitation; the spring flood generally occurs in April.

== Geography ==
The North-West Arm rises at the mouth of La Flippe Lake (length: 1.4 kilometres (0.87 mi); altitude: 684 metres (2,244 ft)). This body of water is bordered by marshes on the north and south banks. The mouth of this lake is located at:

- 2.4 kilometres (1.5 mi) north-west of the place called "La Barrière" located along route 138;
- 1.7 kilometres (1.1 mi) west of a mountain peak (altitude: 831 metres (2,726 ft));
- 7.6 kilometres (4.7 mi) south-west of the village center of Petite-Rivière-Saint-François;
- 4.3 kilometres (2.7 mi) north-east of a curve of the Sainte-Anne River;
- 19.0 kilometres (11.8 mi) south of the mouth of the Bras du Nord-Ouest (confluence with the Rivière du Gouffre), or in downtown Baie-Saint-Paul;
- 7.8 kilometres (4.8 mi) west of the northwest shore of the St. Lawrence River.

From its source, the course of the North-West Arm descends on 27.7 kilometres (17.2 mi) more or less parallel to the shore of the St. Lawrence River, with a drop of 674 metres (2,211 ft), according to the following segments:

- 1.8 kilometres (1.1 mi) northwards, to the outlet of Lac Larouche (coming from the east);
- 1.3 kilometres (0.81 mi) northwards, up to a bend in the river, corresponding to a stream (coming from the east);
- 4.1 kilometres (2.5 mi) towards the northeast by collecting some streams and the outlet (coming from the east) from Lac Équerre, then branching north, until the outlet (coming from the west ) Lac à Foin and Lac Tremblay;
- 6.1 kilometres (3.8 mi) towards the north by forming a big S, then some curves, until the rivière à Idas (coming from the west);
- 5.9 kilometres (3.7 mi) towards the north passing on the east side of the village of Saint-Placide-de-Charlevoix and collecting several streams (coming mainly from the east side, ie from the mountain), up to the Moulin stream;
- 2.5 kilometres (1.6 mi) first towards the north in a deep valley by collecting a few streams (coming from the south-east, ie from the mountain), branching towards the north-east to bypass a mountain whose summit reaches 643 metres (2,110 ft), up to a stream (coming from the north-west);
- 4.6 kilometres (2.9 mi) towards the north-east in a less and less steep valley, forming a few streamers in the middle of the segment, forming a loop towards the north and entering urban areas at the end of the segment, to route 138;
- 1.4 kilometres (0.87 mi) towards the north-east by collecting the discharge (coming from the south) from Le Petit Bras, crossing downtown Baie-Saint-Paul, to its mouth.

The North West Arm flows into a river loop on the west bank of the Rivière du Gouffre, in the town of Baie-Saint-Paul. This mouth is located at:

- 0.7 kilometres (0.43 mi) northwest of downtown Baie-Saint-Paul
- 2.4 kilometres (1.5 mi) north-west of the confluence of the Rivière du Gouffre and Saint Lawrence River;
- 4.6 kilometres (2.9 mi) downstream of the confluence of the rivière des Mares (Gouffre River tributary) and the rivière du Gouffre.

From the mouth of the North West Arm, the current descends on 3.2 kilometres (2.0 mi) with a drop of 6 metres (20 ft) following the course of the Rivière du Gouffre which drains to Baie-Saint-Paul in the St. Lawrence River.

== Toponymy ==
This river is designated "Le Bras" in popular use by residents of the area. In French Canadian toponymy, particularly in the Charlevoix region, the term "arm" is frequently used in place of the generic "river". Formerly, this watercourse was designated "Bras Gariépy" or "Bras des Gariépy". This designation referred to a trading house located nearby and operated by Narcisse Gariépy around 1870. Topnymic variants: Bras Gariépy, Bras Nord-Ouest, Bras Nord-Ouest du Gouffre, Le Bras, Le Petit Bras, Rivière de l'Usine, Rivière du Bras, Rivière du Gouffre Bras Nord-Ouest, Rivière du Gouffre Nord-Ouest, Rivière du Nord-Ouest, Rivière Placide and Rivière Saint-Placide are variants of the official name.

The toponym "Bras du Nord-Ouest" was formalized on August 17, 1978 at the Place Names Bank of the Commission de toponymie du Québec.

== Appendices ==
=== Related articles ===
- Charlevoix Regional County Municipality
- Baie-Saint-Paul, a city
- La Flippe Lake
- Rivière à Idas
- Rivière du Gouffre
- St. Lawrence River
- List of rivers of Quebec
