= Lac Sainte-Anne du Nord =

Lake in Capitale-Nationale, Quebec, Canada

- Location within Quebec
- Location: Lac-Pikauba, Charlevoix Regional County Municipality, Capitale-Nationale, Quebec, Canada
- Coordinates: 47°41′07″N 70°44′14″W
- Primary inflows: (Clockwise from the mouth) Sainte-Anne River, discharge of Grâce Lake.
- Primary outflows: Sainte-Anne River
- Basin countries: Canada
- Max. length: 15 km (9.3 mi)
- Max. width: 0.7 km (0.43 mi)
- Surface elevation: 748 m (2,454 ft)

Lac Sainte-Anne du Nord (English: Sainte Anne lake of the North) is a body of fresh water located in Grands-Jardins National Park, northeast of the city of Quebec, in the unorganized territory of Lac-Pikauba, in the Charlevoix, in the administrative region of Capitale-Nationale, in the province of Quebec, in Canada. The current of the Sainte-Anne River crosses this lake to the southwest over its full length.

The hydrographic side of Lac Sainte-Anne du Nord is served by a secondary forest road linked to the north at route 381, for forestry purposes. Forestry is the main economic activity in this valley; recreational tourism, second.

Because of the altitude, the surface of Lac Sainte-Anne du Nord is generally frozen from the end of November to the beginning of April; however, safe circulation on the ice is generally done from the beginning of December until the beginning of April.

== Geography ==
Lac Sainte-Anne du Nord is encased between mountains whose proximity peaks reach 850 metres (2,790 ft) to the northwest, 845 metres (2,772 ft) to the southeast and 949 metres (3,114 ft) to the northeast. Its mouth is located at:

- 4.5 kilometres (2.8 mi) east of Lac Carré, the outlet of which meets north the south bank of the Petite rivière Malbaie;
- 5.7 kilometres (3.5 mi) south-est of a curve of Malbaie River;
- 71.6 kilometres (44.5 mi) north of the confluence of the Sainte-Anne River and the Saint Lawrence River;
- 32.0 kilometres (19.9 mi) northwest of downtown Baie-Saint-Paul.

Lac Sainte-Anne du Nord has a length of 1.5 kilometres (0.93 mi) in the shape of a rectangle with rounded corners, a maximum width of 0.7 kilometres (0.43 mi) and an altitude of 748 metres (2,454 ft). This lake is mainly fed by the outlet (coming from the north) of the Sainte-Anne river and by the outlet (coming from the east) of Lac Grâce.

From the dam at the mouth of Lake Sainte-Anne du Nord, the current descends on 63.2 kilometres (39.3 mi) first to the southwest, south, then southwest, in following the course of the Sainte-Anne river, which crosses downtown Beaupré, to the northwest shore of the Saint-Laurent river.

== Toponymy ==
This toponymic designation appears on regional map number 3-East, section 23 NW, from 1943 and on the draft of the map of Saint-Urbain, 1958-12-17, item 73. The origin of the name of Lac Sainte-Anne du Nord comes from that of the river which was originally called Rivière Sainte-Anne du Nord. This toponymic designation was approved on April 3, 1959, by the Commission de géographie du Québec. In 1982, the name was changed to Rivière Sainte-Anne to reflect popular usage which omitted the cardinal point. Grand lac Sainte-Anne, Grand lac Sainte-Anne du Nord, Lac Sainte-Anne and Rivière Sainte-Anne du Nord are the variants of this official name.

The toponym "Lac Sainte-Anne du Nord" was formalized on December 5, 1968, at the Place Names Bank of the Commission de toponymie du Québec.

== See also ==
- St. Lawrence River
