= Rivière à Idas =

Location
- Country: Canada
- Province: Quebec
- Region: Capitale-Nationale
- Regional County Municipality: Charlevoix Regional County Municipality
- City: Baie-Saint-Paul

Physical characteristics
- Source: Lac à Idas
  - location: Baie-Saint-Paul
  - coordinates: 47.42417°N 70.71995°W
  - elevation: 884 m (2,900 ft)
- Mouth: Bras du Nord-Ouest
  - location: Baie-Saint-Paul
  - coordinates: 47.40333°N 70.63583°W
  - elevation: 402 m (1,319 ft)
- Length: 8.4 km (5.2 mi)

Basin features
- Tributaries
  - left: (from the mouth) Stream, discharge from a small lake.

The rivière à Idas (English: Idas River) is a tributary of the north bank of the upper part of the Bras du Nord-Ouest, flowing entirely in the town of Baie-Saint-Paul, in the Charlevoix Regional County Municipality, in the administrative region of Capitale-Nationale, in the province of Quebec, in Canada.

This valley is mainly served by a forest road going up the right bank of the watercourse, as well as by the chemin du rang de Saint-Placide Sud. Forestry is the main economic activity in this valley; recreational tourism, second.

The surface of the river in Idas is generally frozen from the beginning of December until the beginning of April; however, safe circulation on the ice is generally done from mid-December to the end of March. The water level of the river varies with the seasons and the precipitation; the spring flood generally occurs in April.

== Geography ==
The Idas river rises at the mouth of Idas Lake (length: 0.7 kilometres (0.43 mi); altitude: 884 metres (2,900 ft)). The mouth of this landlocked lake is located at the bottom of a bay east of the lake, either:

- 2.2 kilometres (1.4 mi) west of a mountain peak (altitude: 982 metres (3,222 ft));
- 2.3 kilometres (1.4 mi) south-east of Montagne du Lac à Ange (altitude: 1,091 metres (3,579 ft));
- 5.1 kilometres (3.2 mi) north-east of a curve of the Sainte-Anne River;
- 10.8 kilometres (6.7 mi) north-west of the village center of Saint-Cassien-des-Caps located along route 138;
- 16.2 kilometres (10.1 mi) west of the northwest shore of the St. Lawrence River;
- 19.0 kilometres (11.8 mi) south of the mouth of the Bras du Nord-Ouest (confluence with the Rivière du Gouffre), or in downtown Baie-Saint-Paul.

From this mouth, the Idas river descends on 8.4 kilometres (5.2 mi) perpendicular to the shore of the St. Lawrence River, with a drop of 482 metres (1,581 ft), according to the following segments:

- 1.1 kilometres (0.68 mi) north-east crossing to the southwest shore of Lac Gonzague (length: 0.5 kilometres (0.31 mi); altitude: 791 metres (2,595 ft)); then crossing the latter lake on 0.25 kilometres (0.16 mi) south-east to its mouth;
- 5.0 kilometres (3.1 mi) towards the south-east in a deep valley and forming a loop towards the south in the middle of the segment to go around a mountain, until the discharge (coming from the north) of a small lake;
- 2.3 kilometres (1.4 mi) towards the east in a less and less steep valley, forming some serpentines and cutting the path of Rang de Saint-Placide Sud, to its mouth.

The Idas river flows on the north bank of the Bras du Nord-Ouest, in the city of Baie-Saint-Paul. This mouth is located at:

- 1.1 kilometres (0.68 mi) south of the village center of Saint-Placide-de-Charlevoix;
- 4.1 kilometres (2.5 mi) west of route 138;
- 2.2 kilometres (1.4 mi) north-west of the Saint-Jean mountain peak (altitude: 690 metres (2,260 ft));
- 11.1 kilometres (6.9 mi) north-east of the course of the Sainte-Anne River;
- 10.7 kilometres (6.6 mi) southwest of the mouth of the Bras du Nord-Ouest (confluence with the rivière du Gouffre), i.e. in downtown Baie-Saint-Paul;
- 9.5 kilometres (5.9 mi) west of the northwest shore of the St. Lawrence River.

From the mouth of the Idas river, the current descends on 14.4 kilometres (8.9 mi) following the course of the Bras du Nord-Ouest; then on 3.2 kilometres (2.0 mi) with a drop of 6 metres (20 ft) following the course of the rivière du Gouffre which flows into Baie-Saint-Paul in the St. Lawrence River.

== Toponymy ==
This toponymic designation appears on the map "Domaine forestier du Séminaire de Québec", 1955–01. It also appears on the cards of the Ruisseau du Pied du Mont number 309 and Lac des Fourches number 308 clubs of the Séminaire de Québec. This toponym evokes the memory of a hunter who once frequented the area. Toponymic variants of the official name: Bras de Saint-Joseph, Bras Saint-Joseph, Bras Saint-Placide, Discharge from the Idas Cup.

The toponym “Rivière à Idas” was formalized on March 25, 1997, at the Place Names Bank of the Commission de toponymie du Québec.

== Appendices ==
=== Related articles ===
- Charlevoix Regional County Municipality
- Baie-Saint-Paul, a city
- Bras du Nord-Ouest (Gouffre River tributary)
- Rivière du Gouffre
- St. Lawrence River
- List of rivers of Quebec
