= Petite rivière Saint-François =

River in Charlevoix Regional County Municipality, Quebec, Canada

- Location within Quebec

Location
- Country: Canada
- Province: Quebec
- Region: Capitale-Nationale
- Regional County Municipality: Charlevoix Regional County Municipality
- Municipality: Petite-Rivière-Saint-François

Physical characteristics
- Source: Confluence of two mountain streams
  - location: Petite-Rivière-Saint-François
  - coordinates: 47°18′32″N 70°35′59″W
  - elevation: 457 m
- Mouth: Saint Lawrence River
  - location: Petite-Rivière-Saint-François
  - coordinates: 47°07′15″N 70°50′07″W
  - elevation: 4 m
- Length: 112 km (70 mi)

The Petite rivière Saint-François (French pronunciation: [pətit ʁivjɛʁ sɛ̃ fʁɑ̃swa], lit. 'Little Saint-François River') is a tributary of the northwest shore of the St. Lawrence River. This river flows in the municipality of Petite-Rivière-Saint-François, in the Charlevoix Regional County Municipality, in the administrative region of Capitale-Nationale, in the province of Quebec, in Canada.

The lower part is served by rue Principale de Petite-Rivière-Saint-François, which runs along the Saint-Laurent river. The economic activities of this valley are concentrated on the bank of the river where recreational tourism activities (notably vacationing) are developed. In addition, the peaks and flanks of the surrounding mountains are used for recreational tourism activities, in particular the important alpine ski center of Massif de Charlevoix which is located very close to the south side of this river and whose flank the mountain for alpine skiing faces the river.

The surface of the lower part of the Petite Rivière Saint-François is generally frozen from the beginning of December until the end of March, except the backwater zones; however, safe traffic on the ice is generally from mid-December to mid-March. The upper part has an additional week's freezing period. The water level of the river varies with the seasons and the precipitation; the spring flood occurs in March or April.

== Geography ==
The Petite Rivière Saint-François rises at the confluence of two mountain streams, in the municipality of Petite-Rivière-Saint-François, on the north side of the mountain peak at Liguori (altitude: 820 metres (2,690 ft)). This source is located at:

- 16.3 kilometres (10.1 mi) south of downtown Baie-Saint-Paul;
- 2.4 kilometres (1.5 mi) west of the center of the village of Petite-Rivière-Saint-François;
- 2.8 kilometres (1.7 mi) east of route 138 which is 5 to 6 kilometers away at this point on the St. Lawrence River;
- 16.7 kilometres (10.4 mi) north-east of Saint-Tite-des-Caps town center.

From its source, the course of this river descends on 3.9 kilometres (2.4 mi) towards the south-east, bending towards the east at the end of the segment, with a drop of 453 metres (1,486 ft), by cutting Principale Street and the railway which runs along the river, to its mouth.

The Petite Rivière Saint-François flows onto the northwest shore of the St. Lawrence River, in the municipality of Petite-Rivière-Saint-François. This confluence is located at:

- 2.0 kilometres (1.2 mi) south of the center of the village of Petite-Rivière-Saint-François;
- 5.9 kilometres (3.7 mi) east of route 138;
- 1.3 kilometres (0.81 mi) north of the hamlet of Grande-Pointe.

== Toponymy ==
During his exploratory journey of 1603 on the St. Lawrence River, Champlain designated this river in the form of "Little River". This watercourse was later designated under the following variants: “Bergeron river” and “Rivière du Sot”.

The toponym "Petite rivière Saint-François" was formalized on December 5, 1968 at the Place Names Bank of the Commission de toponymie du Québec.

== See also ==
- Charlevoix Regional County Municipality
- Petite-Rivière-Saint-François, a municipality
- Le Massif, a massif in Charlevoix
- St. Lawrence River
- List of rivers of Quebec
