= Omer Lavallée =

Omer Lavallée CM
- Born: 1925
- Died: 1992 (aged 66–67)
- Occupation: Railway historian

Omer Lavallée CM (1925–1992) was a Canadian railway historian who served as chief archivist of the Canadian Pacific Railway.

He wrote several books on Canadian railway history, particularly on that of Eastern Canada and later on the Canadian Pacific Railway. He also authored a 14-page bilingual booklet titled Chemin de fer de la Bonne Sainte Anne 1889-1959, telling the illustrated history of rail service on the Beaupré Coast.

In 1989, he was appointed to the Order of Canada.
