= Lombrette River =

River in Quebec, Canada

- Location within Quebec

Location
- Country: Canada
- Province: Quebec
- Region: Capitale-Nationale
- Regional County Municipality: La Côte-de-Beaupré Regional County Municipality
- Municipality: Petite-Rivière-Saint-François and Saint-Tite-des-Caps

Physical characteristics
- Source: Unidentified lake
  - location: Petite-Rivière-Saint-François
  - coordinates: 47°00′20″N 70°39′17″W
  - elevation: 677 m
- Mouth: Sainte-Anne River
  - location: Saint-Tite-des-Caps
  - coordinates: 47°11′05″N 70°44′23″W
  - elevation: 37 m
- Length: 262 km (163 mi)

Basin features
- Tributaries
  - left: (Upward from the mouth) Five unidentified streams, unidentified stream (via a lake), two unidentified streams, discharge from three lakes, discharge from a small lake.
  - right: (Upward from the mouth) Six unidentified streams, rivière des Chenaux, three unidentified streams, McLean Creek.

The Lombrette River is a tributary of the Sainte-Anne River flowing on the north bank of the Saint Lawrence River, in the administrative region of the Capitale-Nationale, in the province of Quebec, in Canada. This river flows consecutively through the regional county municipalities (MRC) of:

- Charlevoix Regional County Municipality: in the municipality of Petite-Rivière-Saint-François;
- La Côte-de-Beaupré Regional County Municipality: in the municipality of Saint-Tite-des-Caps.

This small valley is mainly served by the route 138 which normally runs along the north shore of the St. Lawrence River; however, it distances itself from the river in this area of Charlevoix. Forestry is the main economic activity in this valley; second-hand tourist activities.

The surface of the Lombrette River is generally frozen from the beginning of December until the end of March; however, safe traffic on the ice is generally from mid-December to mid-March. The water level of the river varies with the seasons and the precipitation; the spring flood occurs in March or April.

== Geography ==
The Lombrette River has its source in Petite-Rivière-Saint-François at the mouth of an unidentified lake (altitude of 677 metres (2,221 ft)) which is located between mountain at Liguori (summit located at 3.8 kilometres (2.4 mi) to the north), Salvation Mountain (summit located at 3.3 kilometres (2.1 mi) to the southeast) and McLean Mountain (summit located at 4.4 kilometres (2.7 mi) in the South). This small lake is located at:

- 5.3 kilometres (3.3 mi) east of the west bank of the St. Lawrence River;
- 7.5 kilometres (4.7 mi) south-west of the village center of Petite-Rivière-Saint-François;
- 6.7 kilometres (4.2 mi) east of a curve of the Sainte-Anne River.

From this source, the course of the Lombrette River descends with a drop of 640 metres (2,100 ft) over 26.2 kilometres (16.3 mi) parallel to the edge of the Laurentian plateau away from 4 to 5 km, depending on the following segments:

Upper course of the Lombrette River (segment of 16.8 kilometres (10.4 mi))

- 1.8 kilometres (1.1 mi) to the south, by forming a hook towards the east and down the mountain, to the outlet (coming from the northeast) of a stream;
- 23 kilometres (14 mi) south down the mountain and passing on the west side of Salvation Mountain, to McLean stream (coming from the northwest);
- 1.3 kilometres (0.81 mi) towards the south-east in a deep valley, until the mouth of a small lake which receives a stream (coming from the east);
- 6.8 kilometres (4.2 mi) to the south in a valley between the McLeau Mountain (west side) and another mountain (East side), collecting a stream (coming from the west) and forming many small snakes in places, up to a stream (coming from the east);
- 3.0 kilometres (1.9 mi) to the southwest by forming two S passing from the south side of a small hamlet, to route 138;
- 16 kilometres (9.9 mi) to the south, forming numerous small streamers, until the confluence of the rivière des Chenaux (coming from the north);

Lower course of the Lombrette River (segment of 9.4 kilometres (5.8 mi))

- 7.0 kilometres (4.3 mi) southwards passing west of the hamlet Domaine-Armand-Crépeault west of the village of Saint-Tite-des-Caps, while winding in places, until the outlet of the black stream (coming from the northeast);
- 2.4 kilometres (1.5 mi) south-west in agricultural area, to its mouth.

The Lombrette River flows on the east bank of the Sainte-Anne River, in Saint-Tite-des-Caps. This confluence is located 6.7 kilometres (4.2 mi) west of the northwest shore of the St. Lawrence River and 2.6 kilometres (1.6 mi) southwest of the center of the village of Saint-Tite-des-Caps.

From the confluence of the Lombrette River, the current flows over 140 kilometres (87 mi) generally south along the course of the Sainte-Anne River, to the northwest shore of the St. Lawrence River.

== Toponymy ==
The map of the province of Quebec drawn up in 1870 by Eugène Taché indicates this watercourse in the form "R. The Ombrette”. This toponym would evoke the nickname of Pierre Simard, dit Lombrette, master mason who arrived in New France in 1654 and died between 1681 and 1686, and especially of his son, Noël Simard, dit Lombrette (1637-1715) laborer. The latter obtained, in particular a concession at Cape Maillard in the vicinity of the Lombrette River. The nickname Lombrette, joined to the name of Pierre Simard or Cimar in the census of 1666–1667, still remains enigmatic. If it is not the name of a farm or a place known as the country of origin of Pierre Simard in the surroundings of Angoulême, if need be, the ombrette can be the diminutive of shade, a bony fish that is distinguished from salmon, trout and char by its small mouth. The graphic form L'Ombrette, adopted in 1949, was modified for that of Lombrette in 1974, by the Geographic Commission. The name "Rivière McLean" was also used in memory of John McLean, landowner at Saint-Tite-des-Caps.

The toponym "rivière Lombrette" was formalized on August 29, 1972 at the Place Names Bank of the Commission de toponymie du Québec.

== See also ==
- Capitale-Nationale, an administrative region
- Charlevoix Regional County Municipality
- La Côte-de-Beaupré Regional County Municipality
- Petite-Rivière-Saint-François, a municipality
- Saint-Tite-des-Caps, a municipality
- Rivière des Chenaux
- Sainte-Anne River (Beaupré)
- St. Lawrence River
- List of rivers of Quebec
