= Rivière du Moulin (Baie-Saint-Paul) =

River in Charlevoix Regional County Municipality, Quebec, Canada

- Location within Quebec

Location
- Country: Canada
- Province: Quebec
- Region: Capitale-Nationale
- Regional County Municipality: Charlevoix Regional County Municipality
- Municipality: Petite-Rivière-Saint-François and Baie-Saint-Paul

Physical characteristics
- Source: Small lake in agricultural and forest area
  - location: Petite-Rivière-Saint-François
  - coordinates: 47°22′52″N 70°35′41″W
  - elevation: 442 m
- Mouth: Saint Lawrence River
  - location: Baie-Saint-Paul
  - coordinates: 47°25′24″N 70°30′34″W
  - elevation: 4 m
- Length: 8.5 km (5.3 mi)

The Rivière du Moulin is a tributary of the west shore of Saint-Paul Bay on the northwest shore of the St. Lawrence River. This river flows in the municipality of Petite-Rivière-Saint-François and in the city of Baie-Saint-Paul, in the Charlevoix Regional County Municipality, in the administrative region of Capitale-Nationale, in the province of Quebec, in Canada.

The route 138 runs along the eastern and upper part of this small valley. While the Chemin de la Pointe which runs along the western part of Baie Saint-Paul, serves the lower part. Recreational and tourist activities are the main economic activities in this area thanks in particular to the "Massif de Charlevoix" alpine ski center, which is located very close to the east side of the upper part of this river and whose mountainside is suitable for skiing alpine faces the river.

The surface of the Moulin river is generally frozen from the beginning of December until the end of March, except the backwater areas; however, safe traffic on the ice is generally from mid-December to mid-March. The water level of the river varies with the seasons and the precipitation; the spring flood occurs in March or April.

== Geography ==
The Moulin river rises at the mouth of a small lake (length: 0.26 kilometres (0.16 mi); altitude: 442 metres (1,450 ft)) in a hamlet, between the Saint- Jean (on the west side) and Mont Gabrielle-Roy (on the east side) in the municipality of Petite-Rivière-Saint-François. This source is located at:

- 0.24 kilometres (0.15 mi) west of route 138 which moves 5 to 6 kilometers away from the St. Lawrence River in this area;
- 1.3 kilometres (0.81 mi) west of the summit of Mont Gabriel-Roy (altitude: 710 metres (2,330 ft));
- 5.8 kilometres (3.6 mi) west of the northwest shore of the St. Lawrence River;
- 8.7 kilometres (5.4 mi) south-west of the village center of Petite-Rivière-Saint-François;
- 9.5 kilometres (5.9 mi) south of downtown Baie-Saint-Paul;
- 29.7 kilometres (18.5 mi) north of downtown Saint-Tite-des-Caps.

From its source, the course of this river descends on 8.5 kilometres (5.3 mi) with a drop of 438 metres (1,437 ft), according to the following segments:

- 3.6 kilometres (2.2 mi) north-east, to the outlet (coming from the south-east) of three small lakes;
- 4.5 kilometres (2.8 mi) north-east passing on the east side of the hamlets Côte Saint-Antoine and Dufour, then down the cliff away from route 138 on its east side, to a bend in the river corresponding to the outlet of the middle stream (coming from the northwest);
- 0.4 kilometres (0.25 mi) to the east, cutting the railway, to its mouth.

The Moulin River flows on the west shore of Baie Saint-Paul from the northwest shore of St. Lawrence River, in the municipality of Baie-Saint-Paul. This confluence is located at:

- 1.5 kilometres (0.93 mi) south-west of the confluence of the Malbaie River;
- 2.2 kilometres (1.4 mi) south-east of Baie-Saint-Paul town center;
- 1.6 kilometres (0.99 mi) east of a curve on route 138.

== Toponymy ==
This name is printed on the map Domaine forestier du Séminaire de Québec, 1955–01. It is also found on the broth of the Maillard card, 1959-05-21, item 133. Formerly, there was a sawmill at its mouth. Rivière de la Factory and Rivière des Cascades are two variants of this name.

The toponym "Rivière du Moulin" was formalized on December 5, 1968 at the Place Names Bank of the Commission de toponymie du Québec.

== See also ==
- Capitale-Nationale, an administrative region
- Charlevoix Regional County Municipality
- Petite-Rivière-Saint-François, a municipality
- Baie-Saint-Paul, a city
- St. Lawrence River
- List of rivers of Quebec
