= Sainte-Anne River (Beaupré) =

Sainte-Anne River Rivière Sainte-Anne-du-Nord
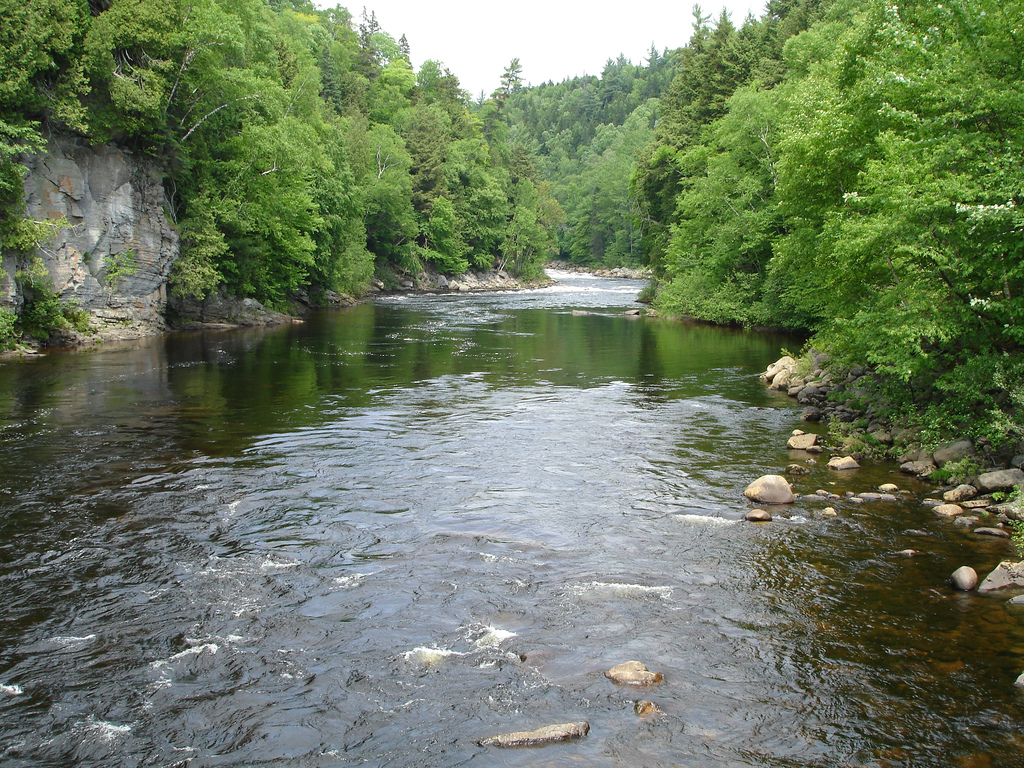
- Sainte-Anne (Beaupré) River

Location
- Country: Canada
- Province: Quebec
- Region: Capitale-Nationale
- Regional County Municipality: Charlevoix Regional County Municipality and La Côte-de-Beaupré Regional County Municipality
- Municipalities: Lac-Pikauba TNO, Baie-Saint-Paul, Saint-Tite-des-Caps, Saint-Ferréol-les-Neiges et Beaupré

Physical characteristics
- Source: Lac Sainte-Anne-du-Nord
  - location: Lac-Pikauba
  - coordinates: 47.685499°N 70.736332°W
  - elevation: 914 m (2,999 ft)
- Mouth: Saint Lawrence River
  - location: Beaupré, MRC La Côte-de-Beaupré Regional County Municipality
  - coordinates: 47.040051°N 70.883446°W
  - elevation: 6 m (20 ft)
- Length: 97 km (60 mi)
- Basin size: 1,077 km^{2} (416 sq mi)

Basin features
- Tributaries
  - left: (upward from the mouth) Seven unidentified streams, Lombrette River, Sables stream (Ludger lake outlet), Montagne des Sables stream, unidentified lake outlet, unidentified dam lake outlet, seven unidentified streams identified, discharge from an unidentified lake, Le Big Creek, discharge from an unidentified lake, discharge from two unidentified lakes, unidentified stream, Petit Lac Double stream, unidentified stream, discharge from an unidentified lake, outlet of Lac de la Berline, unidentified stream, unidentified stream, unidentified stream (via the lake formed by the Lac-Long Dam), unidentified stream (via the lake formed by the Wabano Dam), unidentified stream (via Lac Pemmican), unidentified stream (via Lac Arthabaska), unidentified stream.
  - right: (upward from the mouth) Jean-Larose River, ruisseau non identifié, rivière du Moulin (Sainte-Anne River tributary), ruisseau non identifié, rivière des Roches (Sainte-Anne River tributary), ruisseau non identifié, ruisseau non identifié, décharge de deux lacs non identifiés, rivière du Mont Saint-Étienne, Brûlée River (Sainte-Anne River tributary), ruisseau Beaumier, quatre ruisseaux non identifiés, Petite rivière Savane (rivière Sainte-Anne), huit ruisseaux non identifiés, rivière Savane du Nord, rivière ? (décharge du lac Ladouceur), décharge du Lac de la Soupe, ruisseau Courganne (décharge du Lac des Fermiers), ruisseau non identifié, décharge du lac Beaupré, ruisseau non identifié, décharge de l'Étang des Libellules, ruisseau non identifié, décharge du lac Turgeon, deux ruisseaux non identifiés, décharge du Lac du Rat Musqué et du Lac des Bois Verts.

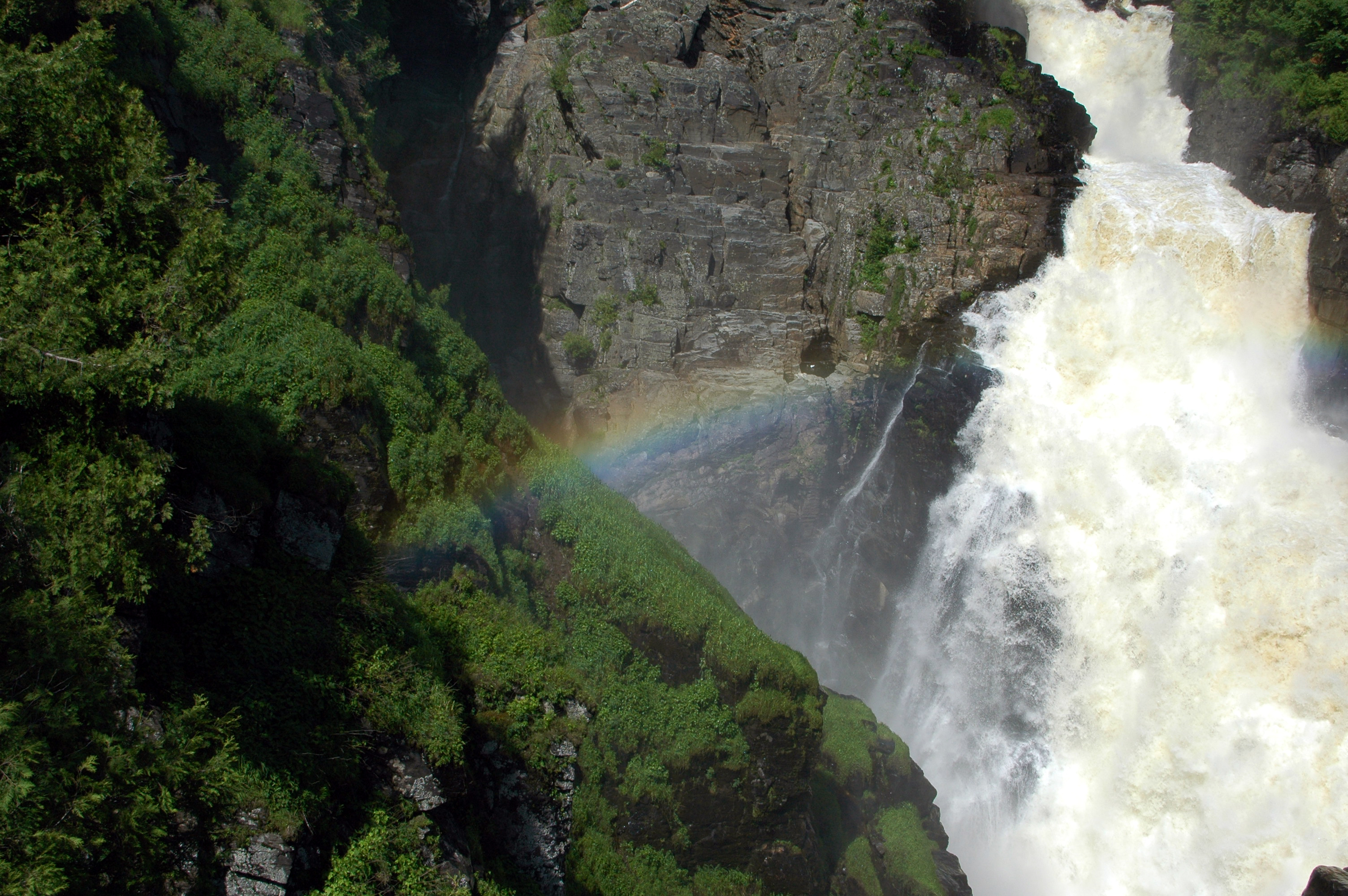
Canyon Sainte-Anne on Sainte-Anne-du-Nord River

Sainte-Anne River (French pronunciation: [sɛ̃t an]) or Sainte-Anne du Nord River ([sɛ̃t an dy nɔʁ]) is a tributary of the northwest shore of the Saint Lawrence River where it flows at the height of Beaupré. This river flows in Capitale-Nationale, in the province of Quebec, Canada. The river passes through Canyon Sainte-Anne before joining the Saint Lawrence River at Beaupré.

== Geography ==
Rivière Sainte-Anne is a river in the Capitale-Nationale region. It has a length of 72,2 km, covers a basin of 1,077 km^{2} (416 sq mi) and has an average flow of 26 m3/s. The river finds its source at Lac de la Tour in Grands-Jardins National Park. From there, it flows south and ends at Beaupré, opposite Île d'Orléans, 35 km northeast of Quebec City in the St. Lawrence River.

In Saint-Ferréol-les-Neiges are the Seven Chutes, falls which in many cases are 128 m high. Then the river crosses the Canyon Sainte-Anne, a gorge with a length of 10 km. At its end, in Saint-Joachim is the Sainte-Anne waterfall, 74 m high.

Upper course of the Sainte-Anne river (downstream of Lac de la Tour) (segment of 9.0 kilometres (5.6 mi))

- 3.4 kilometres (2.1 mi) towards the south-east, branching east towards the end of the segment by crossing a first small lake, crossing the route 381, then crossing the Lake at Lizé (length: 0.6 kilometres (0.37 mi); altitude: 792 metres (2,598 ft)), to its mouth;
- 5.6 kilometres (3.5 mi) towards the southwest crossing on 0.6 kilometres (0.37 mi) Lake Perrault, then crossing on 1.5 kilometres (0.93 mi) on Lac Sainte-Anne du Nord (altitude: 748 kilometres (465 mi)), to its mouth;

Upper course of the Sainte-Anne river (downstream from Lac Sainte-Anne du Nord) (segment of 9.3 kilometres (5.8 mi))

- 0.9 kilometres (0.56 mi) towards the southwest in a deep valley by collecting the discharge (coming from the east) of the Pointu Lake and the discharge (coming from the northwest) of the Lac du Versant, to the outlet (coming from the north) from Lac à Poux;
- 0.5 kilometres (0.31 mi) south, to the outlet (coming from the southwest) from Lac Turgeon;
- 1.9 kilometres (1.2 mi) to the southeast, crossing Lake Arthabaska (length: 0.2 kilometres (0.12 mi); altitude: 701 metres (2,300 ft)), crossing Pemmican Lake (length: 0.4 kilometres (0.25 mi); altitude: 698 metres (2,290 ft)), up to Wabano Dam;
- 2.8 kilometres (1.7 mi) south-east almost in a straight line, crossing Lac Troué and Lac Long, crossing the Barrage du Lac-Long, collecting the discharge (coming from the north ) from Buies and Théodule lakes, to a bend in the river; then south in a deep valley curving east to the outlet (coming from the northwest) of Chaudière and Beaupré lakes;
- 1.8 kilometres (1.1 mi) to the south in a deep valley, collecting the Courganne stream (coming from the west), to the Petit Lac Double stream (coming from the northeast);
- 1.4 kilometres (0.87 mi) to the south in a deep valley, collecting a river (coming from the west), bending towards the southeast, until the confluence of the rivière Savane du Nord (coming from the south);

Intermediate course of the Sainte-Anne river (downstream of the “rivière Savane du Nord) (segment of 26.4 kilometres (16.4 mi))

- 5.0 kilometres (3.1 mi) towards the south-east in a deep valley, collecting the discharge (coming from the west) from the North-East Lake, until Le Big Creek (coming from the north);
- 8.3 kilometres (5.2 mi) towards the south-east in a deep valley, then towards the east, up to a bend of the river corresponding to a stream (coming from the north-east);
- 3.7 kilometres (2.3 mi) to the south, forming a gap towards the east at the start of the segment, then crossing eight series of rapids, up to Petite rivière Savane (coming from the northwest);
- 4.5 kilometres (2.8 mi) to the south, forming a large S at the start of the segment, crossing five series of rapids, to the outlet (coming from the east) of an unidentified lake;
- 4.9 kilometres (3.0 mi) to the south by crossing several series of rapids, by collecting the Beaumier stream (coming from the northwest), bypassing two islands, up to a bend of the river, corresponding to the confluence of the Brûlée River (Sainte-Anne River tributary) (coming from the south);

Intermediate course of the Sainte-Anne river (downstream of the Brûlée River) (segment of 16.5 kilometres (10.3 mi))

- 4.4 kilometres (2.7 mi) towards the south-east by forming a large S, bypassing a first island (length: 0.3 kilometres (0.19 mi)) and a second island (length: 0.5 kilometres (0.31 mi)), to the confluence of the Sables Mountain Creek (coming from the east);
- 1.8 kilometres (1.1 mi) first towards the east by collecting the discharge (coming from the north) of an unidentified lake, towards the south, then the south-east, crossing series of rapids, to the rivière du Mont Saint-Étienne (coming from the west);
- 2.1 kilometres (1.3 mi) towards the south-east by crossing a series of rapids at the start of the segment, up to the route 360 bridge;
- 5.2 kilometres (3.2 mi) south-east, south, then south-east, collecting a stream (coming from the north-west), relatively in a straight line, up to the Lombrette River (from the northeast);
- 1.4 kilometres (0.87 mi) southwards, bending westwards, to the Sept-Chutes dam;
- 1.6 kilometres (0.99 mi) towards the south-west by crossing the seven falls (in front of the hamlet "Les Sept-Chutes") and a series of rapids, until the rivière des Roches (coming from the north);

Lower course of the Sainte-Anne river (segment of 11.0 kilometres (6.8 mi))

- 5.6 kilometres (3.5 mi) to the south in a deep valley and crossing several series of rapids, forming a hook towards the east, crossing the Bassin de l'Érablière in mid-segment where it receives a stream (coming from the west), then forming a large curve towards the west, up to the Sainte-Anne Falls corresponding to the confluence of the rivière du Moulin (Sainte-Anne River) (coming from the northwest);
- 2.4 kilometres (1.5 mi) to the south, forming a large S to bypass the mountains, crossing two series of rapids and collecting the waters of the Jean-Larose River at the end of the segment (coming from the northwest), to a dam;
- 1.4 kilometres (0.87 mi) towards the south-east by forming a curve towards the north-east, crossing three series of rapids, up to the bridge of the route 138;
- 1.1 kilometres (0.68 mi) first towards the east, then towards the south bypassing the urban sector of Beaupré, up to the railway bridge;
- 0.5 kilometres (0.31 mi) towards the south-east by crossing the bay endowed with a marina which serves as a haven for pleasure boats, to its mouth.

The Sainte-Anne river ends at Beaupré, opposite the northern tip of Île d'Orléans, on the northwest shore of the St. Lawrence River. This mouth is located at:

- 35 km northeast of downtown of Quebec City;
- 26.0 kilometres (16.2 mi) north-east of the bridge connecting the Île d'Orléans to L'Ange-Gardien (Côte-de-Beaupré);
- 2.5 kilometres (1.6 mi) north-west of Île d'Orléans, crossing the Chenal de l'Île d'Orléans (English: Channel of Île d'Orléans).

== Toponymy ==
The toponym "Rivière Sainte-Anne" was formalized on April 4, 1982 at the Place Names Bank of the Commission de toponymie du Québec

== Sept-Chutes hydroelectric plant ==
The Sept-Chutes power plant, a hydroelectric power plant run-of-the-water power plant belonging to Hydro-Québec is on the Sainte-Anne river. It was built in 1916 and modernized in 1999. It has 4 turbines for a total output of 22 MW. The hydraulic potential amounts to 124.97 m. The power station can be visited.

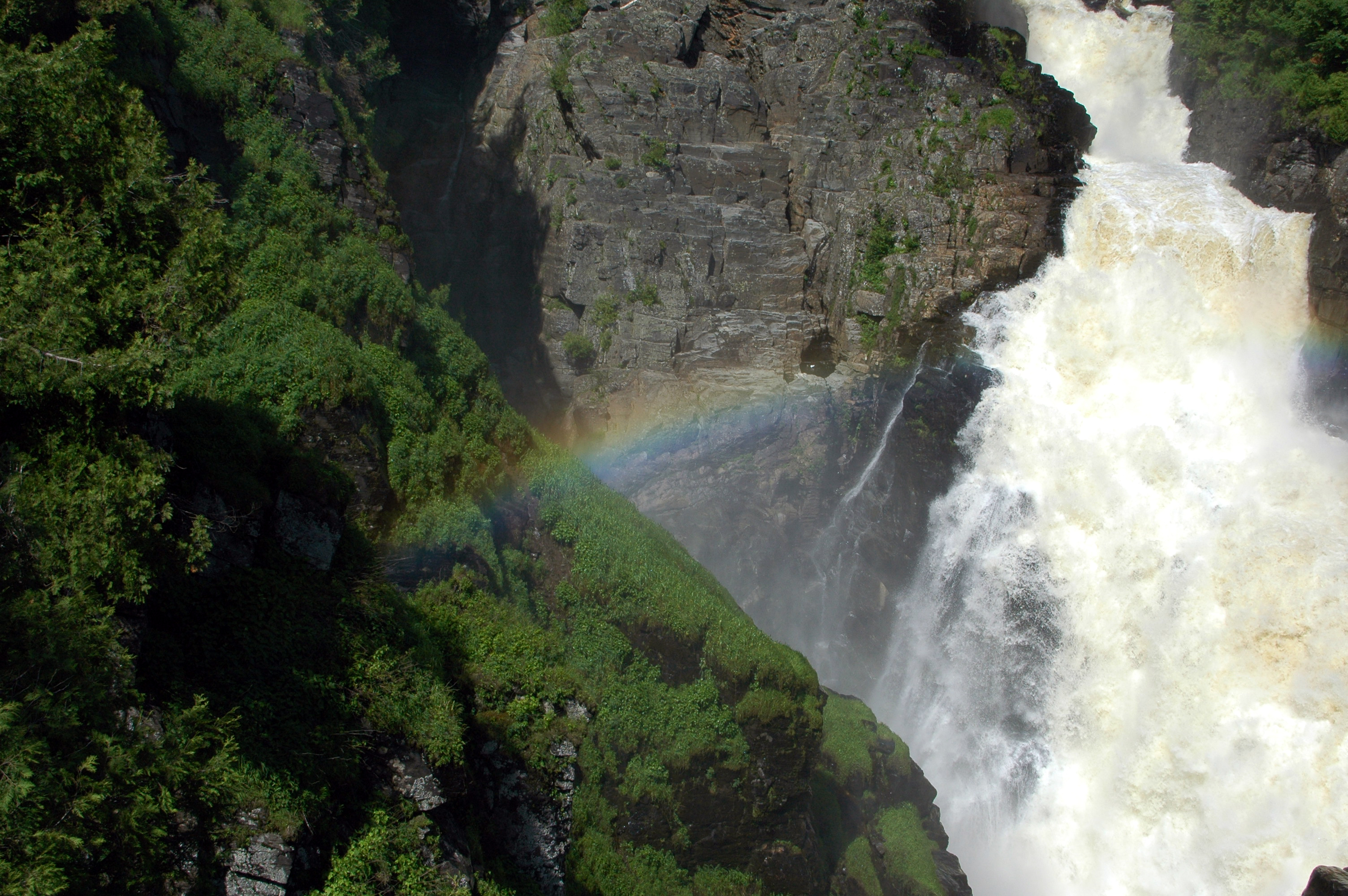
Canyon Sainte-Anne

== Hydro-Canyon hydroelectric plant ==
It was in 2016 that the hydroelectric power station of Société Hydro-Canyon Saint-Joachim started up a hydroelectric power station over water 300 meters upstream from Canyon Sainte-Anne.

The Hydro-Canyon Saint-Joachim run-of-river power plant project was designed taking into account the technical and environmental aspects of the integration environment.

The development will harmonize with the recreotourism facilities of Canyon Sainte-Anne.

The works will optimize the site on the hydroelectric level while developing the potential of the Sainte-Anne waterfall. The maximum power of the plant will be 23.2 MW.

The installation will include:

- A weir threshold to maintain the upstream level of the river
- A spillway
- A water intake
- An entrance gallery
- A power plant including production equipment
- A substation and a power line connecting the site to the Hydro-Québec network

== Sport ==
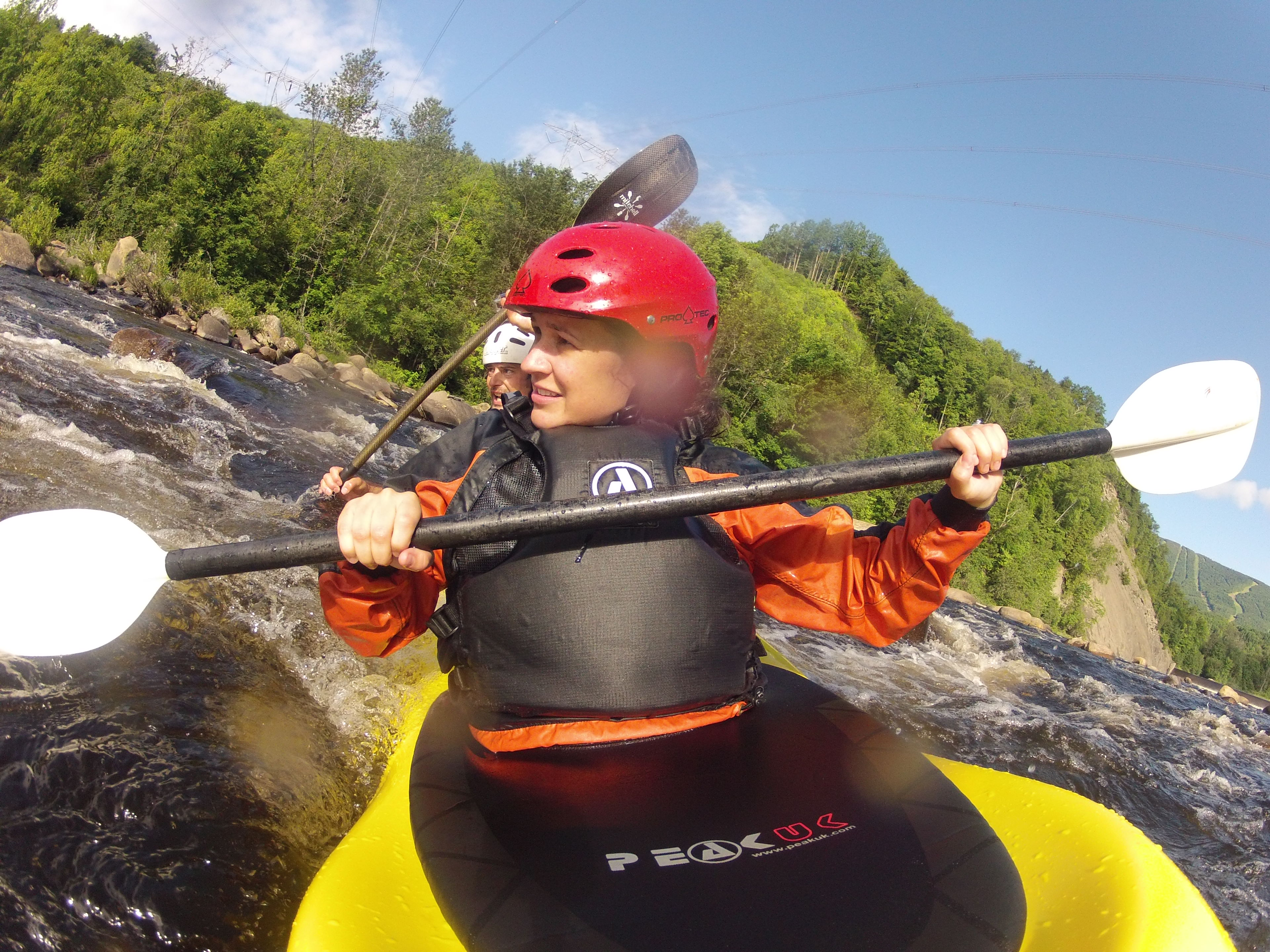

The Sainte-Anne-du-Nord river has also been used since 1966 by a club and a river kayak school. First bearing the name of Club Echohamok, it has evolved to bear today the name of Côte-de-Beaupré. It must be said that the Sainte-Anne-du-Nord river has a portion of river located between the Sept-Chutes hydroelectric plant and the Hydro-Canyon hydroelectric plant which is classified 5 stars by the guide of rivers of Quebec.

== Appendices ==
=== See also ===
- La Côte-de-Beaupré Regional County Municipality
- Lac-Pikauba, un territoire non organisé
- Saint-Ferréol-les-Neiges, une municipalité
- Saint-Joachim, une municipalité
- Beaupré, Quebec, une municipalité
- Chenal de l'Île d'Orléans
- Grands-Jardins National Park
- Laurentides Wildlife Reserve
- Canyon Sainte-Anne
- St. Lawrence River
- List of rivers of Quebec
