= Saint-Ferréol-les-Neiges =

- Municipality
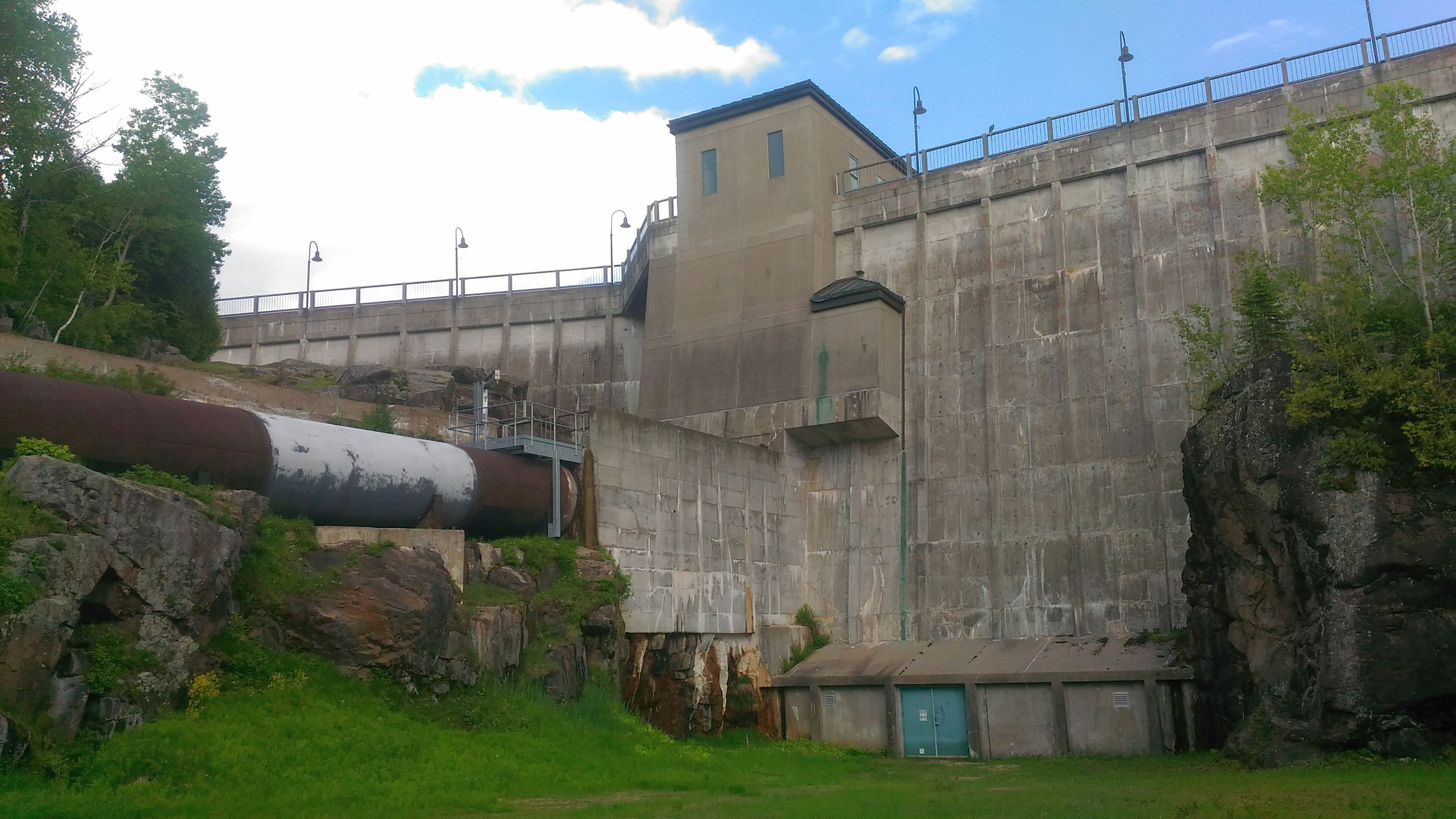
- Sept-Chutes Power Station

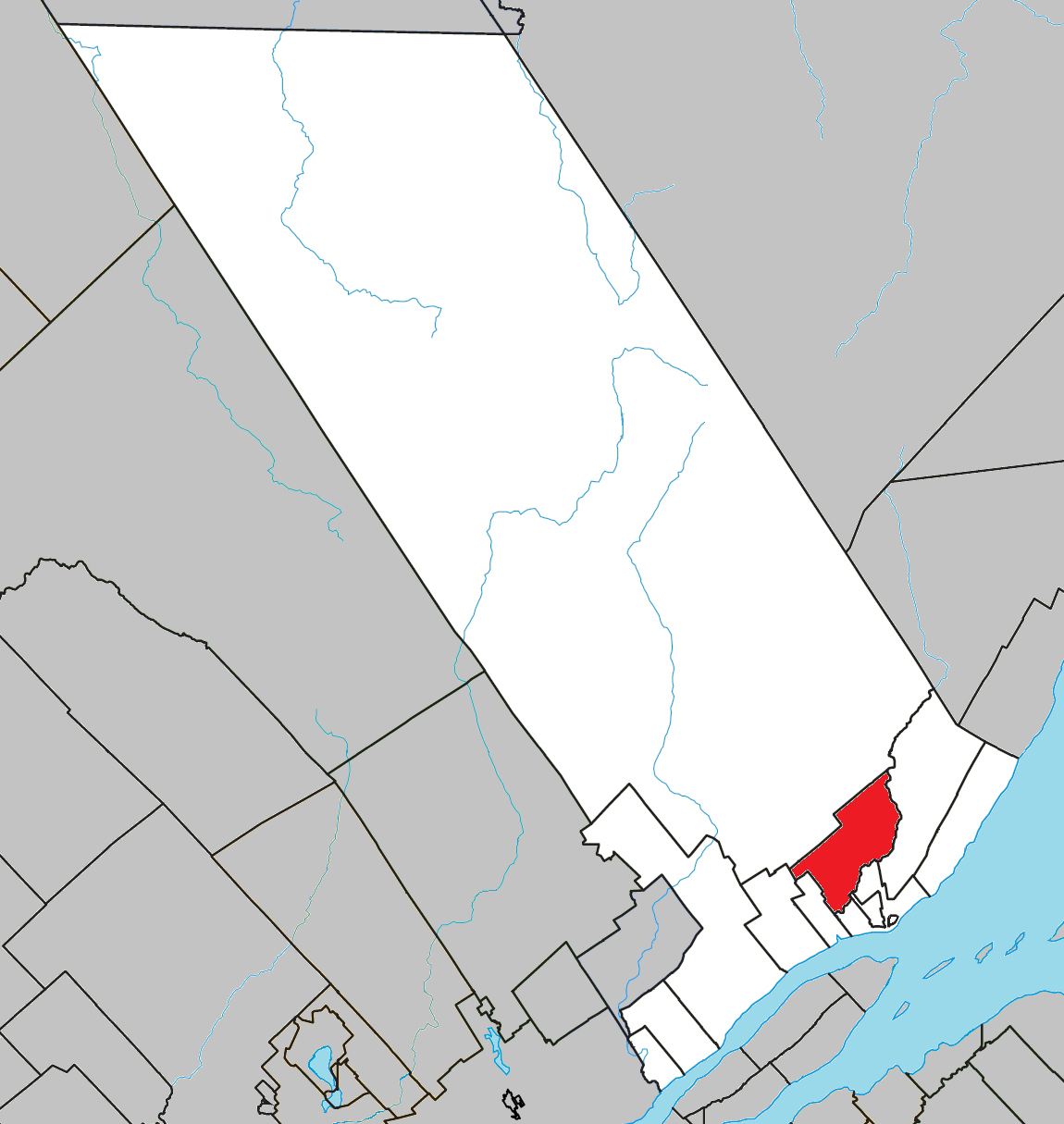
- Location within La Côte-de-Beaupré RCM

- Location in central Quebec
- Coordinates: 47°07′N 70°51′W
- Country: Canada
- Province: Quebec
- Region: Capitale-Nationale
- RCM: La Côte-de-Beaupré
- Settled: 1728
- Constituted: July 1, 1855

Government
  - Mayor: Mélanie Royer-Couture
  - Federal riding: Montmorency—Charlevoix
  - Prov. riding: Charlevoix–Côte-de-Beaupré

Area
  - Total: 85.3 km^{2} (32.9 sq mi)
  - Land: 83.18 km^{2} (32.12 sq mi)

Population (2021)
  - Total: 3,806
  - Density: 45.8/km^{2} (119/sq mi)
  - Pop (2016-21): ▲17.5%
  - Dwellings: 2,697
- Time zone: UTC−5 (EST)
  - Summer (DST): UTC−4 (EDT)
- Postal code(s): G0A 3R0
- Area codes: 418 and 581
- Highways: R-360
- Website: www.saintferreollesneiges.qc.ca

Saint-Ferréol-les-Neiges (French pronunciation: [sɛ̃ feʁeɔl le nɛʒ]) is a municipality in Quebec, Canada.

== History ==
First explored in 1693 by Louis Soumande (1652-1706) during a hunting expedition, the first settlers came in 1728 when some families were invited to settle there at the invitation of the area's seigneurial lords, also the leaders of the Seminary of Quebec. In 1801, the Parish of Saint-Ferréol was formed out of the parishes of Saint-Joachim and Sainte-Anne-de-Beaupré, named after Jean Lyon de Saint-Ferréol (1692-1744), vicar to the Bishop of Quebec.

In 1845, the municipality was first founded, abolished in 1847, and reestablished in 1855 as the Parish Municipality of Saint-Féréol. In 1969, it changed status and was renamed to Municipality of Saint-Feréol-les-Neiges. The suffix Les-Neiges (French for "the snows") was added to highlight the good snow conditions of nearby Mont-Sainte-Anne and the resulting prosperity. In 1978, the spelling of its name was corrected by adding the extra "r".

Parts of Saint-Féréol were annexed by the Town of Beaupré in 1964.

== Demographics ==
Historical census populations – Saint-Ferréol-les-Neiges

Year	Pop.	±%
1871	991	—
1881	1,061	+7.1%
1891	1,041	−1.9%
1901	1,052	+1.1%
1911	1,136	+8.0%
1921	1,348	+18.7%
1931	1,328	−1.5%
1941	1,655	+24.6%

Year	Pop.	±%
1951	1,998	+20.7%
1956	2,101	+5.2%
1961	2,003	−4.7%
1966	1,847	−7.8%
1971	1,596	−13.6%
1976	1,647	+3.2%
1981	1,758	+6.7%
1986	1,717	−2.3%

Year	Pop.	±%
1991	1,995	+16.2%
1996	2,219	+11.2%
2001	2,014	−9.2%
2006	2,546	+26.4%
2011	2,964	+16.4%
2016	3,240	+9.3%
2021	3,806	+17.5%

Population counts are not adjusted for boundary changes.
Source: Statistics Canada

Private dwellings occupied by usual residents (2021): 1,806 (total dwellings: 2,697)

Mother tongue (2021):

- English as first language: 1.7%
- French as first language: 95.8%
- English and French as first language: 1.3%
- Other as first language: 1.1%

== Local government ==
List of former mayors:

- Germain Tremblay (...–2013)
- Parise Cormier (2013–2021)
- Mélanie Royer-Couture (2021–present)

== See also ==
- List of municipalities in Quebec
