= Saint-Tite-des-Caps =

- Municipality
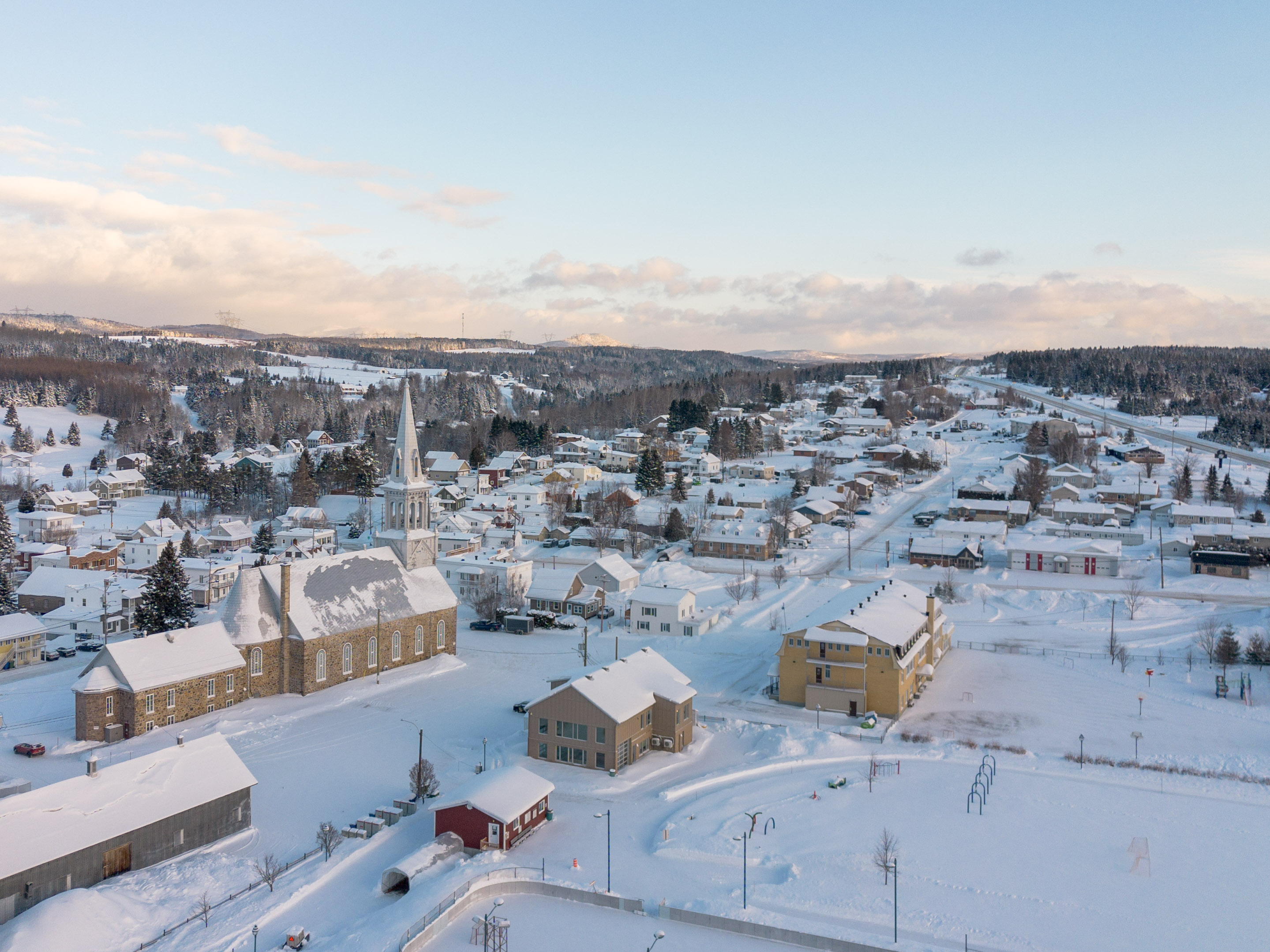
- Saint-Tite-des-Caps in 2026
- Motto: Travail Vertu
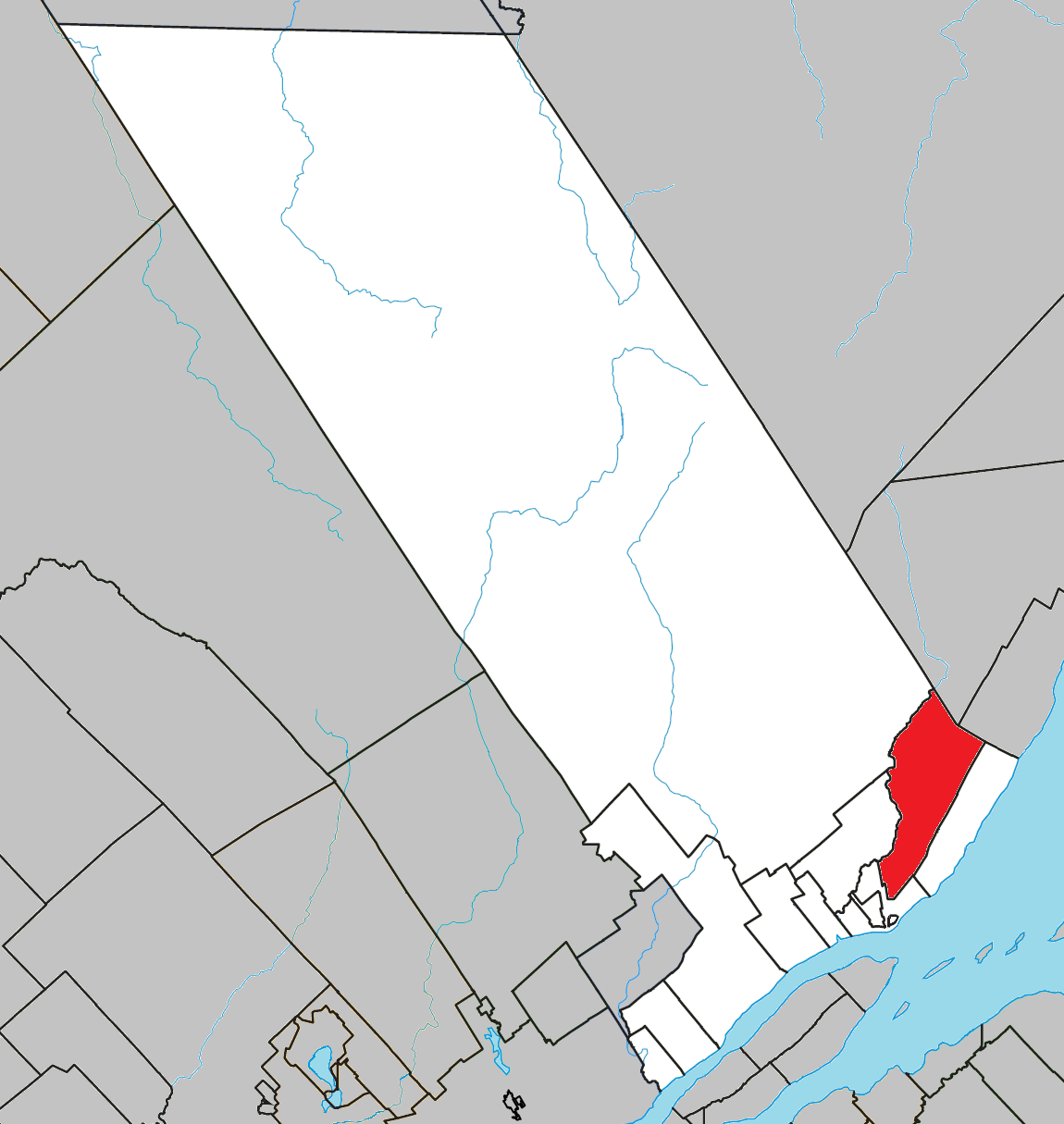
- Location within La Côte-de-Beaupré RCM

- Location in central Quebec
- Coordinates: 47°08′N 70°46′W
- Country: Canada
- Province: Quebec
- Region: Capitale-Nationale
- RCM: La Côte-de-Beaupré
- Settled: 1853
- Constituted: December 24, 1872

Government
  - Mayor: Majella Pichette
  - Federal riding: Montmorency—Charlevoix
  - Prov. riding: Charlevoix–Côte-de-Beaupré

Area
  - Total: 132.42 km^{2} (51.13 sq mi)
  - Land: 129.30 km^{2} (49.92 sq mi)
- Elevation: 700 m (2,300 ft)

Population (2021)
  - Total: 1,504
  - Density: 11.6/km^{2} (30/sq mi)
  - Pop 2006-2011: ▲2.1%
  - Dwellings: 887
- Time zone: UTC−5 (EST)
  - Summer (DST): UTC−4 (EDT)
- Postal code(s): G0A 4J0
- Area codes: 418 and 581
- Highways: R-138 R-360
- Website: sainttitedescaps.com

Saint-Tite-des-Caps (French pronunciation: [sɛ̃ tit de kap]) is a municipality in La Côte-de-Beaupré Regional County Municipality in Quebec, Canada. Located on Route 138 to Baie-Saint-Paul, this road climbs up sharply to about 700 meters (2,300 ft) to reach the town nestled in a valley. The Sainte-Anne-du-Nord River forms the municipal western boundary.

The place is named after Titus, companion of Saint Paul, whereas "des-Caps" indicates its position within the Capes Region, that stretches from Cape Tourmente to Baie-Saint-Paul.

== History ==
In 1853, the mission was founded, that became the Parish of Saint-Tite-des-Caps in 1876 when it separated from Saint-Joachim. In 1866, its post office opened. In 1872, the Municipality of Saint-Tite-des-Caps was incorporated.

In 1971, a part of its territory was dissolved and returned to unorganized.

== Demographics ==
Historical census populations – Saint-Tite-des-Caps

Year	Pop.	±%
1871	663	—
1881	727	+9.7%
1891	975	+34.1%
1901	1,040	+6.7%
1911	1,192	+14.6%
1921	1,411	+18.4%
1931	1,401	−0.7%
1941	1,566	+11.8%

Year	Pop.	±%
1951	1,678	+7.2%
1956	2,036	+21.3%
1961	2,057	+1.0%
1966	1,899	−7.7%
1971	1,780	−6.3%
1976	1,671	−6.1%
1981	1,700	+1.7%
1986	1,584	−6.8%

Year	Pop.	±%
1991	1,523	−3.9%
1996	1,522	−0.1%
2001	1,426	−6.3%
2006	1,440	+1.0%
2011	1,506	+4.6%
2016	1,473	−2.2%
2021	1,504	+2.1%

Population counts are not adjusted for boundary changes.
Source: Statistics Canada

Private dwellings occupied by usual residents (2021): 720 (total dwellings: 887)

Mother tongue (2021):

- English as first language: 0.3%
- French as first language: 98.7%
- English and French as first language: 0%
- Other as first language: 0.3%

== Local government ==
List of mayors of Saint-Tite-des-Caps since incorporation:

- Isaïe Ferland (1861–1862, 1873–1875, 1881–1882, 1885–1887)
- Hypolitte Dessers (1862–1863)
- Jean–Baptiste Jean (1863–1864)
- Éloi Boucher (1864–1866)
- Célestin Chevalier (1866–1868, 1872–1873)
- Onézime Leblond (1868–1872, 1875–1877)
- Alexandre Lavoie (1877–1878)
- Alfred Leclair (1878–1880)
- Napoléon Poulin (1880–1881)
- Édouard Girard (1882–1885, 1887–1890, 1891–1893)
- Jules Gagnon (1890–1891)
- Auguste Lavoie (1893–1897)
- Norbert Morency (1897–1914)
- Wilfrid Labranche (1914–1916)
- Ludger Leblond (1916–1917)
- Joseph Gauthier (1917–1921)
- Achille Lachance (1921–1931)
- David Morency (1931–1935, 1937–1944)
- Alfredo Leclerc (1935–1937)
- Télesphore Duclos (1944–1949)
- Ludger Duclos (1949–1958, 1964–1966)
- Noël Drouin (1958–1961)
- Albany Duclos (1961–1964)
- Paul–Eugène Morency (1966–1967)
- Roland Ferland (1967–1969)
- Jean–Noël Fortin (1969–1971)
- Paul Duchesne (1971–1975)
- Léopold Ferland (1975–1984)
- Huguette Filion Morency (1984–1987)
- Jean–Claude Clouet (1987–1998)
- Anne–Marie Guilbault (1998–2005)
- Pierre Dion (2005–2013)
- Majella Pichette (2013– )

== See also ==
- Rivers flowing through Saint-Tite-des-Caps
  - Lombrette River
  - Rivière des Chenaux
  - Sainte-Anne River (Beaupré)
- List of municipalities in Quebec
