= Petite-Rivière-Saint-François =

- Municipality
- Municipalité de Petite-Rivière-Saint-François
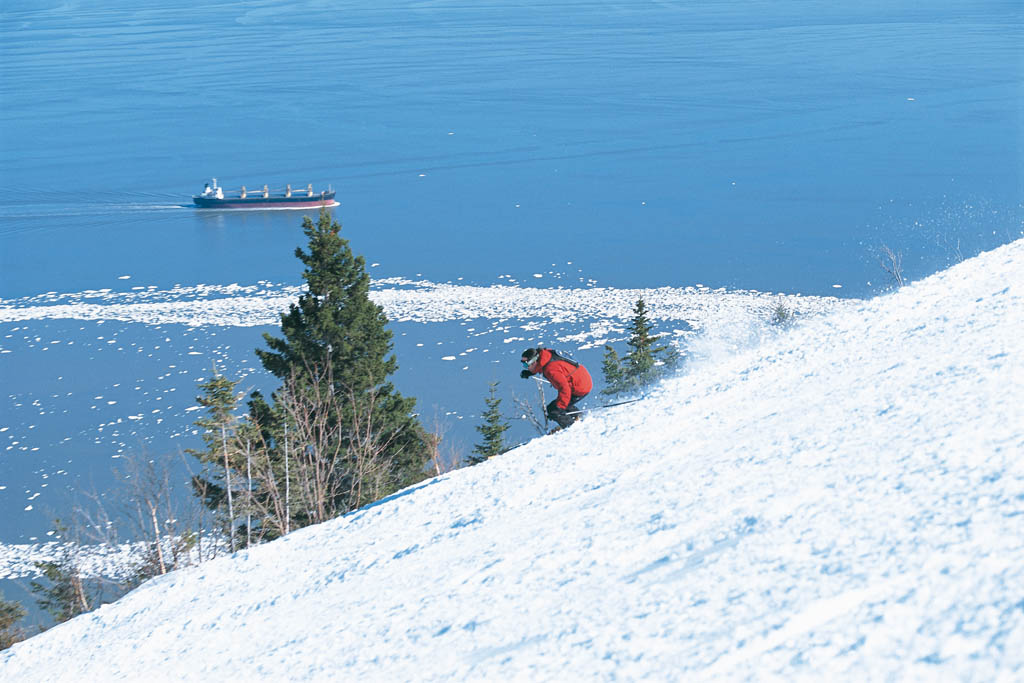
- Le Massif mountain overlooking the St. Lawrence River
- Motto: Vers le large, vers les hauteurs
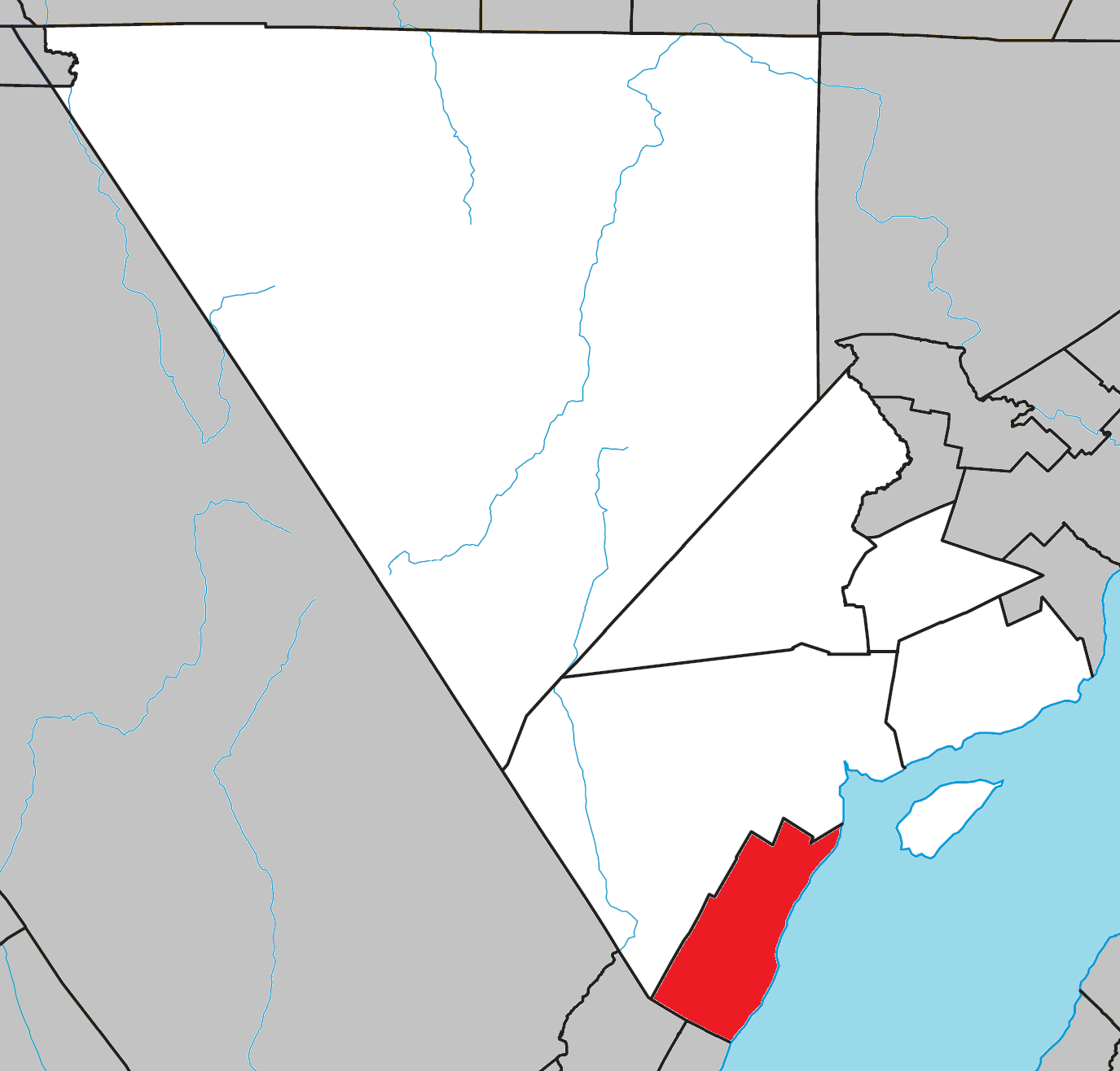
- Location within Charlevoix RCM

- Location in central Quebec
- Coordinates: 47°18′N 70°34′W
- Country: Canada
- Province: Quebec
- Region: Capitale-Nationale
- RCM: Charlevoix
- Settled: 1675
- Constituted: July 1, 1855
- Named for: Petite rivière Saint-François

Government
  - Mayor: Jean-Guy Bouchard
  - Federal riding: Montmorency—Charlevoix
  - Prov. riding: Charlevoix–Côte-de-Beaupré

Area
  - Total: 149.85 km^{2} (57.86 sq mi)
  - Land: 133.89 km^{2} (51.70 sq mi)

Population (2021)
  - Total: 953
  - Density: 7.1/km^{2} (18/sq mi)
  - Pop (2016-21): ▲17.1%
  - Dwellings: 858
- Time zone: UTC−5 (EST)
  - Summer (DST): UTC−4 (EDT)
- Postal code(s): G0A 2L0
- Area codes: 418 and 581
- Highways: R-138
- Website: www.petiteriviere.com

Petite-Rivière-Saint-François (French pronunciation: [pətit ʁivjɛʁ sɛ̃ fʁɑ̃swa]) is a municipality in Quebec, Canada, along the St. Lawrence River. It is considered the gateway to the Charlevoix region.

It is named after the Petite rivière Saint-François (Little Saint-François River), and home to Le Massif ski resort.

== History ==
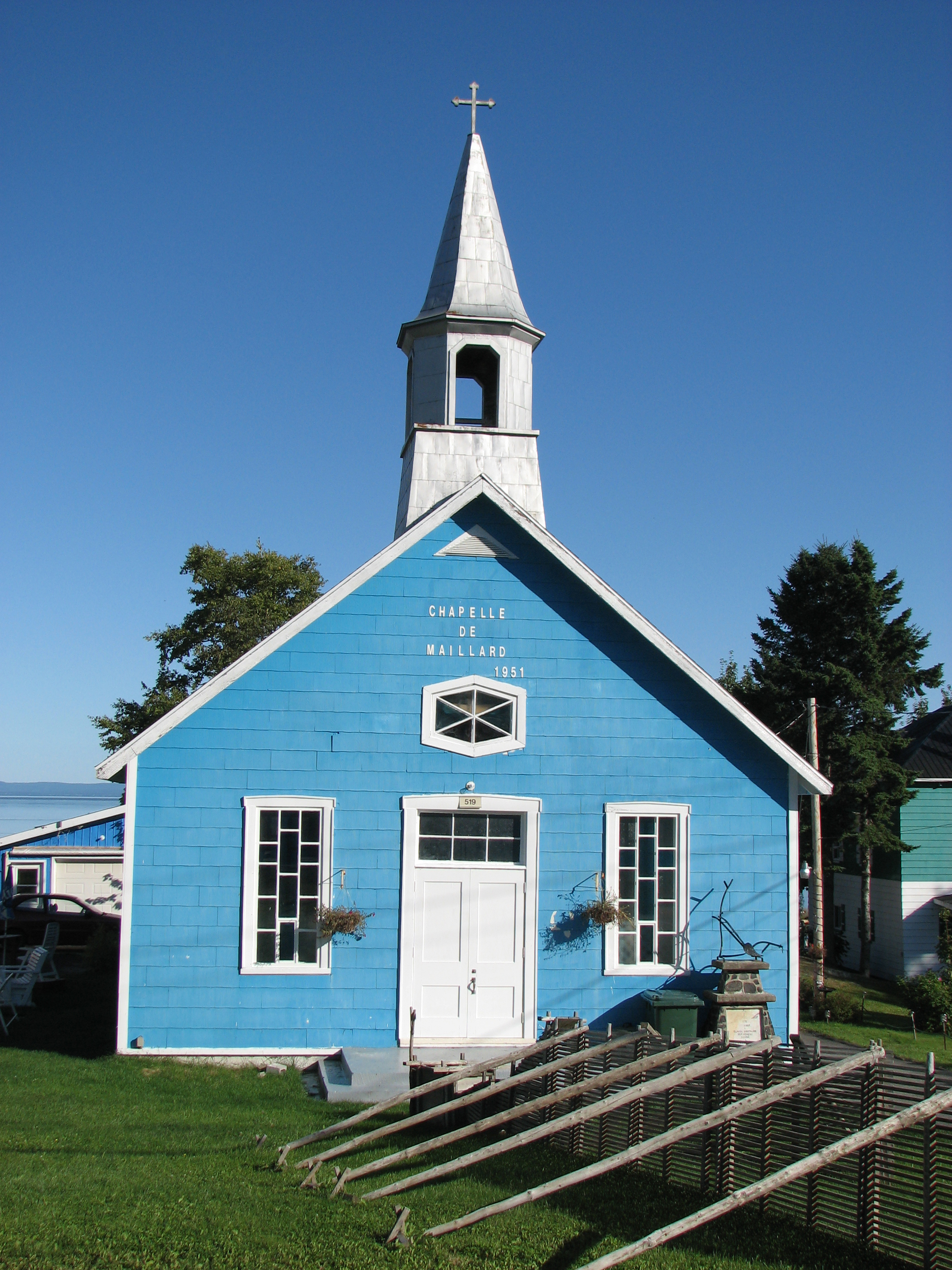
Maillard Chapel

In June 1603, Samuel de Champlain sailed past there and wrote about the location: "The following Thursday, we left [Hare Island], and lowered the anchor in a dangerous cove on the north side, where there are some meadows and a little river where the Indians sometimes camp." The name Petite Rivière ("Little River") stuck, although over time the place has been identified in many other ways: Cap-Raide, Rivière-du-Sot, Anse-aux-Pommiers, l'Abattis (1695), l'Abatis (1755), Vieille-Rivière, Ruisseau-à-la-Nasse, Cap-Maillard, François-Xavier, Côte-de-Saint-François-Xavier' Saint-François-Xavier-de-la-Petite-Rivière-Saint-François.

In 1636, the entire area from Beauport to the Rivière du Gouffre was granted as a seignory to the Company of One Hundred Associates. This seignory, called Seigneury of Beaupré, was acquired by the Seminary of Quebec in 1662.

In 1675, the Seminary of Quebec granted land to Claude Bouchard, followed by another 15 concessions until the end of the 17th century. The settlement, the oldest in the Charlevoix region, grew at the mouth of the Little River in a deep valley east of Cape Maillard where natural open grassland accommodated the early colonizers. In 1721, the local parish was formed, named Saint-François-Xavier after Francis Xavier, founder of the Jesuits. In 1825, the community was connected to the Chemin des Caps (now Route 138).

In 1845, it was incorporated but the municipality was abolished in 1847. In 1855, it was reestablished as the Parish Municipality of Saint-François-Xavier-de-la-Petite-Rivière. In common use, the place remained known as just Petite-Rivière.

In 1914, the Charlevoix Railway between Quebec City and La Malbaie, along with two stations in the municipality, was built. In 1927, a quay was constructed, leading to shipbuilding and maritime transportation activity in Petite-Rivière. Passenger service on the railway ended in 1959. In the 1970s, Le Massif ski resort opened.

In 1986, it changed status and name to become the Municipality of Petite-Rivière-Saint-François.

== Geography ==
The inhabited part of the municipality is located on a narrow strip of land between the St. Lawrence River and the Laurentian Mountains. From its source in the centre of the municipality, the Petite rivière Saint-François flows southeast to its mouth at the St. Lawrence.

In addition to the main population centre of Petite-Rivière, the municipality also contains the hamlets of Grande-Pointe (47°16′27″N 70°34′27″W), Maillard (47°20′13″N 70°32′46″W), and Saint-Cassien-des-Caps (47°21′31″N 70°36′52″W).

=== Climate ===
Climate data for Petite-Rivière-Saint-François (1981–2010 normals, extremes 1972–present)
Month	Jan	Feb	Mar	Apr	May	Jun	Jul	Aug	Sep	Oct	Nov	Dec	Year
Record high °C (°F)	14.5 (58.1)	10.5 (50.9)	17.5 (63.5)	29.0 (84.2)	32.0 (89.6)	32.5 (90.5)	34.5 (94.1)	32.8 (91.0)	29.5 (85.1)	23.5 (74.3)	20.5 (68.9)	14.0 (57.2)	34.5 (94.1)
Mean daily maximum °C (°F)	−5.6 (21.9)	−3.7 (25.3)	1.1 (34.0)	7.8 (46.0)	15.5 (59.9)	20.8 (69.4)	23.8 (74.8)	22.9 (73.2)	17.7 (63.9)	11.4 (52.5)	4.6 (40.3)	−1.6 (29.1)	9.6 (49.2)
Daily mean °C (°F)	−10.4 (13.3)	−8.4 (16.9)	−3.3 (26.1)	3.8 (38.8)	10.6 (51.1)	15.8 (60.4)	18.5 (65.3)	17.8 (64.0)	13.0 (55.4)	7.2 (45.0)	0.9 (33.6)	−5.5 (22.1)	5.0 (41.0)
Mean daily minimum °C (°F)	−14.7 (5.5)	−13.0 (8.6)	−7.6 (18.3)	−0.3 (31.5)	5.7 (42.3)	10.7 (51.3)	13.3 (55.9)	12.6 (54.7)	8.3 (46.9)	3.0 (37.4)	−2.7 (27.1)	−9.4 (15.1)	0.5 (32.9)
Record low °C (°F)	−34.0 (−29.2)	−35.6 (−32.1)	−27.5 (−17.5)	−17.0 (1.4)	−7.2 (19.0)	−3.0 (26.6)	1.5 (34.7)	0.5 (32.9)	−2.5 (27.5)	−9.0 (15.8)	−18.0 (−0.4)	−28.0 (−18.4)	−35.6 (−32.1)
Average precipitation mm (inches)	88.7 (3.49)	73.6 (2.90)	80.7 (3.18)	90.0 (3.54)	119.1 (4.69)	114.0 (4.49)	102.1 (4.02)	97.0 (3.82)	97.9 (3.85)	101.9 (4.01)	102.1 (4.02)	84.3 (3.32)	1,151.4 (45.33)
Average rainfall mm (inches)	18.7 (0.74)	18.1 (0.71)	38.8 (1.53)	78.7 (3.10)	119.1 (4.69)	114.0 (4.49)	102.1 (4.02)	97.0 (3.82)	97.9 (3.85)	101.7 (4.00)	78.7 (3.10)	18.7 (0.74)	883.5 (34.79)
Average snowfall cm (inches)	70.1 (27.6)	55.5 (21.9)	41.9 (16.5)	11.5 (4.5)	0.0 (0.0)	0.0 (0.0)	0.0 (0.0)	0.0 (0.0)	0.0 (0.0)	0.1 (0.0)	23.4 (9.2)	65.6 (25.8)	268.1 (105.5)
Average precipitation days (≥ 0.2 mm)	13.4	10.6	11.0	11.7	13.5	14.6	15.3	14.9	14.2	14.1	13.1	12.5	158.9
Average rainy days	2.0	1.8	4.5	10.3	13.5	14.6	15.3	14.9	14.2	14.1	9.7	3.5	118.4
Average snowy days (≥ 0.2 cm)	12.4	9.4	7.5	2.5	0.0	0.0	0.0	0.0	0.0	0.06	4.2	9.9	45.96
Source: Environment Canada

== Demographics ==
Historical census populations – Petite-Rivière-Saint-François

Year	Pop.	±%
1861	728	—
1871	597	−18.0%
1881	765	+28.1%
1891	886	+15.8%
1901	855	−3.5%
1911	1,083	+26.7%
1921	982	−9.3%
1931	1,179	+20.1%

Year	Pop.	±%
1941	1,228	+4.2%
1951	1,306	+6.4%
1956	1,375	+5.3%
1961	1,356	−1.4%
1966	1,296	−4.4%
1971	1,146	−11.6%
1976	976	−14.8%
1981	920	−5.7%

Year	Pop.	±%
1986	863	−6.2%
1991	802	−7.1%
1996	753	−6.1%
2001	730	−3.1%
2006	703	−3.7%
2011	744	+5.8%
2016	814	+9.4%
2021	953	+17.1%

Source: Statistics Canada

Private dwellings occupied by usual residents (2021): 455 (total dwellings: 858)

Mother tongue (2021):

- English as first language: 1.1%
- French as first language: 98.4%
- English and French as first language: 0.5%
- Other as first language: 0.5%

== See also ==
- Charlevoix tourist train, a panoramic tour train
- Rivière du Sault (Charlevoix)
- Ruisseau de la Martine
- Rivière du Moulin (Baie-Saint-Paul)
