= Beaupré, Quebec =

Beaupré
- City
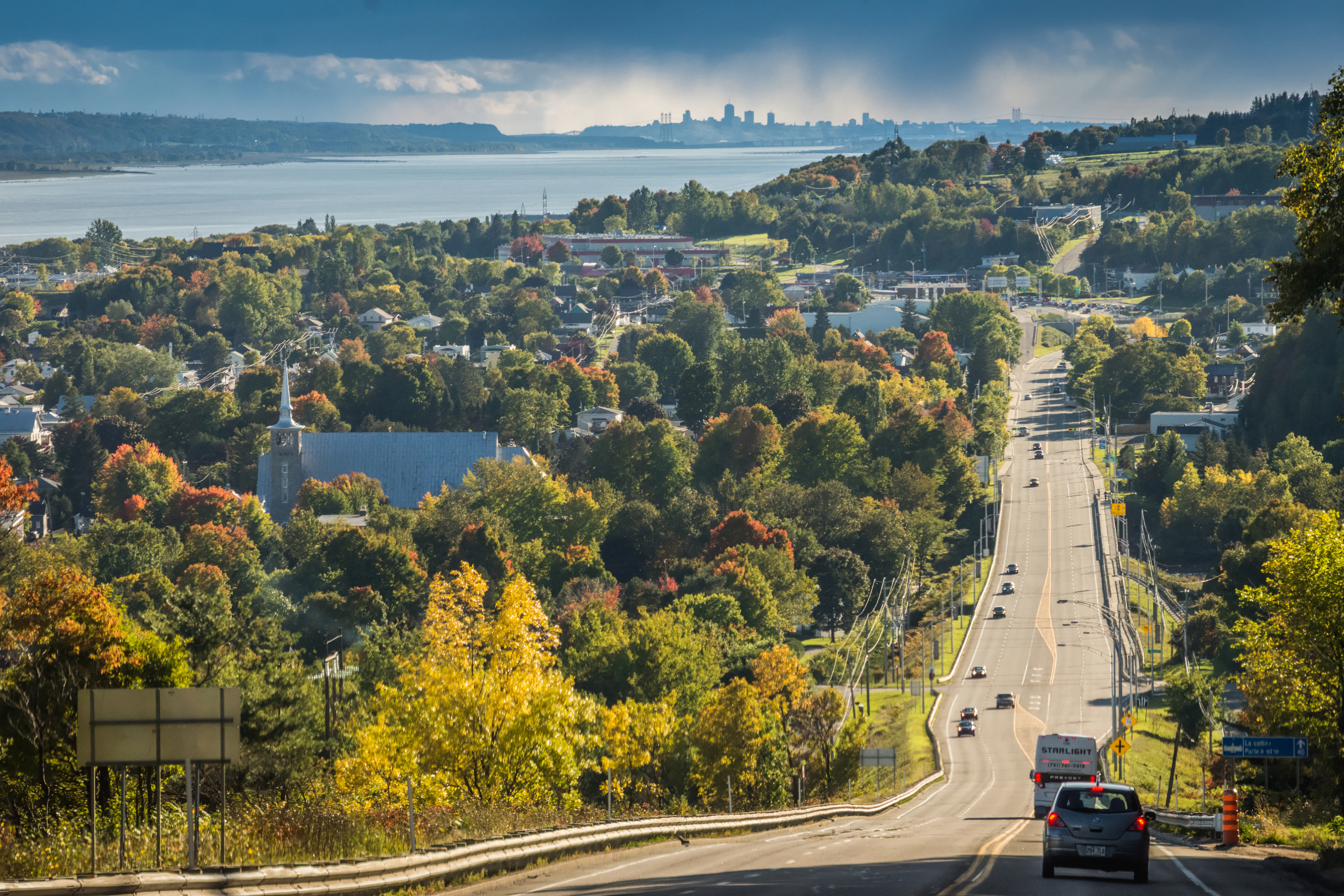

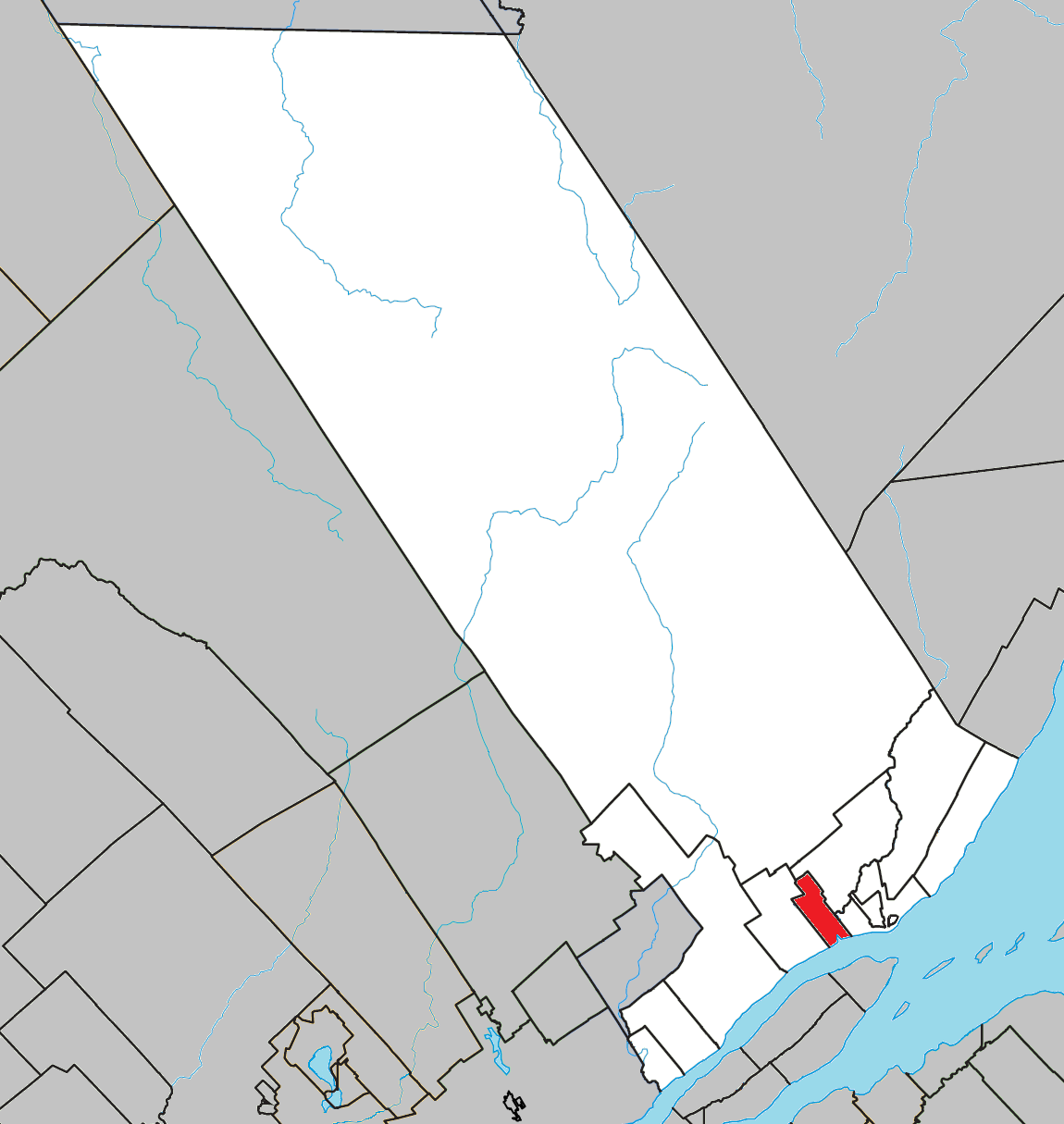
- Location within La Côte-de-Beaupré RCM

- Location in central Quebec
- Coordinates: 47°03′N 70°54′W
- Country: Canada
- Province: Quebec
- Region: Capitale-Nationale
- RCM: La Côte-de-Beaupré
- Constituted: April 23, 1928

Government
  - Mayor: Pierre Renaud
  - Fed. riding: Montmorency—Charlevoix
  - Prov. riding: Charlevoix–Côte-de-Beaupré

Area
  - Total: 27.0 km^{2} (10.4 sq mi)
  - Land: 22.97 km^{2} (8.87 sq mi)

Population (2021)
  - Total: 4,117
  - Density: 179.2/km^{2} (464/sq mi)
  - Pop 2016-2021: ▲9.7%
  - Dwellings: 2,812
- Time zone: UTC−5 (EST)
  - Summer (DST): UTC−4 (EDT)
- Postal code(s): G0A
- Area codes: 418 and 581
- Highways: R-138 R-360
- Website: www.villedebeaupre.com

Beaupré (French pronunciation: [bopʁe]) is a ville in the Canadian province of Quebec, located in La Côte-de-Beaupré Regional County Municipality. The town is along the St. Lawrence River and Route 138 at the mouth of the Sainte-Anne-du-Nord River.

Mont-Sainte-Anne, the highest skiing station in the eastern part of Canada, is located in Beaupré. It is also one of the town's major sport attractions.

== History ==
The area has been inhabited since the beginning of the New France colony. In the 17th century, Breton sailors, when landing on the coastal plains, reputedly exclaimed: "Oh! le beau pré" ("Oh! the beautiful meadow"). The fused form of Beaupré has been in use since at least 1636 when the Beaupré Company was established. Its parish formed out of two of the oldest parishes of Quebec, Sainte-Anne-de-Beaupré and Saint-Joachim. Its population in 1666 was 533 inhabitants, comparable to Quebec with 547 inhabitants.

On April 28, 1928, the place was incorporated as the Parish Municipality of Notre-Dame-du-Rosaire, but its name and status was changed to Municipality of Beaupré in September of that same year in order to avoid confusion with several other namesake parishes. In 1962, the municipality gained town status and became Ville de Beaupré.

In 1963 and 1964, Beaupre annexed portions of the Municipalities of Sainte-Anne-de-Beaupré and St-Féréol respectively.

== Demographics ==
In the 2021 Census of Population conducted by Statistics Canada, Beaupré had a population of 4,117 living in 1,859 of its 2,812 total private dwellings, a change of 9.7% from its 2016 population of 3,752. With a land area of 22.97 km^{2} (8.87 sq mi), it had a population density of 179.2/km^{2} (464.2/sq mi) in 2021.

Historical census populations – Beaupré, Quebec

Year	Pop.	±%
1931	1,233	—
1941	1,501	+21.7%
1951	2,015	+34.2%
1956	2,381	+18.2%
1961	2,587	+8.7%
1966	2,926	+13.1%

Year	Pop.	±%
1971	2,862	−2.2%
1976	2,821	−1.4%
1981	2,740	−2.9%
1986	2,725	−0.5%
1991	2,676	−1.8%
1996	2,799	+4.6%

Year	Pop.	±%
2001	2,761	−1.4%
2006	3,006	+8.9%
2011	3,439	+14.4%
2016	3,752	+9.1%
2021	4,117	+9.7%

Population counts are not adjusted for boundary changes.
Source: Statistics Canada

Mother tongue (2021):

- English as first language: 1.2%
- French as first language: 97.5%
- English and French as first language: 0.5%
- Other as first language: 0.7%

== Economy ==
One of the region's major employers, AbitibiBowater closed its plant there in October 2009. On 13, the city authorized the destruction of the old 1927 plant following various soliciting attempts.

== Local government ==
List of former mayors:

- Arthur W. Cooper (1928–1932)
- Onésime Boudreault (1932–1936)
- Joseph C. Fournier (1936–1940)
- Vital Roy (1940–1944)
- Ludger Cauchon (1944–1947)
- J. Adelbert Tardif (1947–1954)
- Léonce Larsen (1954–1957)
- Frédérick Atkins (1957–1959)
- Louis Philippe Antoine Bélanger (1959–1975)
- Lucien Gauthier (1975–1995)
- Henri Cloutier (1995–2009)
- Michel Paré (2009–2016)
- Pierre Renaud (2016–present)

== See also ==
- Rivière aux Chiens
- Rivière des Sept Crans
- Chenal de l'Île d'Orléans
- List of cities in Quebec
