= Jean-Noël =

Jean-Noël is a French given name, composed of Jean and Noël. It may refer to:

== Persons ==
Notable people with the name include:

- Jean-Noël Augert (born 1949), French alpine skier
- Jean-Noël Bongrain, founder of French dairy products corporation Bongrain
- Jean-Noël Crocq (born 1948), French clarinetist
- Jean-Noël Fagot (born 1958), French ice speed skater
- Jean-Noël Guérini (born 1951), member of the Senate of France
- Jean-Noël Huck (born 1948), French former professional football player and manager
- Jean-Noël Jeanneney (born 1942), French historian and politician
- Jean-Noël Lavoie (1927–2013), notary and former political figure in Quebec
- Jean-Joël Perrier-Doumbé (born 1978), French-born Cameroonian football player
- Jean-Noël Tremblay (1926–2020), Canadian politician

== Toponyms ==
- Jean-Noël River, a tributary of the north shore of the Saint Lawrence River, in Charlevoix Regional County Municipality and Charlevoix-Est Regional County Municipality, in Capitale-Nationale, Quebec, Canada.
- Rivière Jean-Noël Nord-Est, a tributary of the Jean-Noël River, flowing in La Malbaie and Saint-Irénée, in Charlevoix-Est Regional County Municipality, Capitale-Nationale, Quebec, in Canada.
