= Armand-Jude River =

River in Charlevoix Regional County Municipality, Quebec, Canada

- Location within Quebec

Location
- Country: Canada
- Province: Quebec
- Region: Capitale-Nationale
- Regional County Municipality: Charlevoix Regional County Municipality
- Municipality: Les Éboulements

Physical characteristics
- Source: Laterrière Lake
  - location: Les Éboulements
  - coordinates: 47°32′34″N 70°22′54″W
  - elevation: 346 m
- Mouth: Ruisseau de la Martine
  - location: Les Éboulements
  - coordinates: 47°31′22″N 70°22′21″W
  - elevation: 290 m
- Length: 4.0 km (2.5 mi)

Basin features
- Tributaries
  - right: Outlet of a little lake.

The Armand-Jude River is a tributary of the north bank of the rivière du Seigneur on the northwest bank of the St. Lawrence River. This stream flows in the municipality of Les Éboulements, in the Charlevoix Regional County Municipality, in the administrative region of Capitale-Nationale, in the province of Quebec, in Canada.

The valley of this stream is mainly served by the path of Saint-Hilarion which goes north to the east side. The lower part is served by the chemin du rang Sainte-Marie which goes up the valley of the Lord's river. Forestry is the main economic activity in this valley.

The surface of the Armand-Jude River is generally frozen from the beginning of December until the end of March; however, safe traffic on the ice is generally from mid-December to mid-March. The water level of the river varies with the seasons and the precipitation; the spring flood occurs in March or April.

== Geography ==
The Armand-Jude river originates from a small lake (length: 0.1 kilometres (0.062 mi); altitude: 346 metres (1,135 ft)), located in the forest area on the west side of Chemin de Saint-Hilarion, in Les Éboulements. The mouth of this small lake is located at:

- 3.7 kilometres (2.3 mi) south-east of the village center of Saint-Hilarion;
- 8.6 kilometres (5.3 mi) north-west of the village center of Les Éboulements;
- 21.4 kilometres (13.3 mi) south-west of La Malbaie town center;
- 2.8 kilometres (1.7 mi) north-west of the mouth of the Armand-Jude river.

From this source, the course of the Armand-Jude river descends on 4.0 kilometres (2.5 mi), with a drop of 56 metres (184 ft), according to the following segments:

- 1.8 kilometres (1.1 mi) towards the south-east by cutting the path of Saint-Hilarion and forming a large curve towards the north-east, up to a stream (coming from the north-west);
- 2.2 kilometres (1.4 mi) towards the south-east in the forest and agricultural zone, by crossing the chemin du rang Sainte-Marie passing between two small lakes and bending towards the south-east, until its mouth.

The Armand-Jude river flows on the north bank of the rivière du Seigneur. This mouth is located at:

- 6.5 kilometres (4.0 mi) south-east of the center of the village of Saint-Hilarion;
- 22.2 kilometres (13.8 mi) southwest of downtown La Malbaie;
- 5.9 kilometres (3.7 mi) south-west of the village center of Les Éboulements.

== Toponymy ==
This person's name was collected during a 1976 survey.

The toponym "rivière Armand-Jude" was formalized on August 17, 1978 at the Place Names Bank of the Commission de toponymie du Québec.

== Appendices ==
=== Related articles ===
- Charlevoix Regional County Municipality
- Les Éboulements, a municipality
- Rivière du Seigneur
- St. Lawrence River
- List of rivers of Quebec
