= Rivière du Seigneur =

River in Charlevoix Regional County Municipality, Quebec, Canada

- Location within Quebec

Location
- Country: Canada
- Province: Quebec
- Region: Capitale-Nationale
- Regional County Municipality: Charlevoix Regional County Municipality
- Municipality: Les Éboulements

Physical characteristics
- Source: Laterrière Lake
  - location: Les Éboulements
  - coordinates: 47°31′08″N 70°22′09″W
  - elevation: 298 m
- Mouth: Ruisseau de la Martine
  - location: Les Éboulements
  - coordinates: 47°27′46″N 70°20′23″W
  - elevation: 4 m
- Length: 10.7 km (6.6 mi)

Basin features
- Tributaries
  - left: (Upstream from the mouth) Ten unidentified streams, Armand-Jude River.
  - right: (Upstream from the mouth) Discharge from a small lake, discharge from a small lake, discharge from the lake in Mimi, discharge from a small lake.

The rivière du Seigneur (English: River of the Lord) is a tributary of the northwest shore of the St. Lawrence River, in the municipality of Les Éboulements, in the Charlevoix Regional County Municipality, in the administrative region of Capitale-Nationale, in the province of Quebec, in Canada.

The upper part of this small valley is accessible by the chemin du rang Sainte-Marie and by the chemin du rang Sainte-Catherine. The lower part is served by the Route du Port which goes up the valley and the Route du Fleuve which runs parallel to the river bank. Forestry and agriculture are the main economic activities in this valley.

The surface of the Lord's river is generally frozen from the beginning of December until the end of March; however, safe traffic on the ice is generally from mid-December to mid-March. The water level of the river varies with the seasons and the precipitation; the spring flood occurs in March or April.

== Geography ==
The Lord's river rises from Lac Laterrière (length: 0.25 kilometres (0.16 mi); altitude: 298 metres (978 ft)), located in the forest area on the west side of rang Sainte-Catherine road and south of rang Sainte-Marie Road, in Les Éboulements. It is mainly fed by the Clermont stream (coming from the northwest). The mouth of this small lake is located at:

- 5.9 kilometres (3.7 mi) north-west of the village center of Les Éboulements;
- 6.4 kilometres (4.0 mi) north-west of Anse de la Vieille Église on the north-west bank of the St. Lawrence River;
- 22.4 kilometres (13.9 mi) south-west of La Malbaie town center;
- 6.6 kilometres (4.1 mi) north-west of the mouth of the Lord's river.

From this source, the course of the Lord's river descends on 10.7 kilometres (6.6 mi), with a drop of 294 metres (965 ft), according to the following segments:

- 0.2 kilometres (0.12 mi) towards the northeast by forming an S, up to the confluence of the Armand-Jude River (coming from the northwest);
- 2.2 kilometres (1.4 mi) towards the south-east, winding slightly, to the outlet (coming from the south-west) of a small mountain lake;
- 4.1 kilometres (2.5 mi) towards the south-east, bending towards the north-east, up to a stream (coming from the north-east);
- 1.7 kilometres (1.1 mi) south in agricultural area, to route 362;
- 2.5 kilometres (1.6 mi) to the south in an increasingly steep valley, crossing the Port route and cutting the railway which runs along the shore of the St. Lawrence River, to its mouth.

The Lord's river flows into Baie des Éboulements, on the northwest shore of the Estuary of Saint Lawrence, in the hamlet Les Éboulements-Center. This mouth is located at:

- 2.2 kilometres (1.4 mi) north-east of the center of the village of Saint-Joseph-de-la-Rive in the municipality of Les Éboulements;
- 25.6 kilometres (15.9 mi) southwest of downtown La Malbaie;
- 2.5 kilometres (1.6 mi) south-west of the village center of Les Éboulements.

== Toponymy ==
The name “Rivière du Moulin” was the official form in the 1969 Toponymic Directory.

The toponym "Rivière du Seigneur" was formalized on August 17, 1978 at the Place Names Bank of the Commission de toponymie du Québec.

== Appendices ==
=== Related articles ===
- Charlevoix Regional County Municipality
- Les Éboulements, a municipality
- Armand-Jude River
- St. Lawrence River
- List of rivers of Quebec
