= Rivière du Premier Rang =

River in Charlevoix Regional County Municipality, Quebec, Canada

- Location within Quebec

Location
- Country: Canada
- Province: Quebec
- Region: Capitale-Nationale
- Regional County Municipality: Charlevoix Regional County Municipality
- Municipality: Saint-Hilarion, Les Éboulements

Physical characteristics
- Source: Lac aux Bois-Verts
  - location: Saint-Hilarion
  - coordinates: 47°35′31″N 70°22′07″W
  - elevation: 347 m
- Mouth: Jean-Noël River
  - location: Les Éboulements
  - coordinates: 47°33′28″N 70°20′22″W
  - elevation: 310 m
- Length: 9.3 km (5.8 mi)

Basin features
- Tributaries
  - left: Four unidentified streams.
  - right: Seven unidentified streams.

The Rivière du Premier Rang (English: First Row River) is a tributary of the west bank of the Jean-Noël River flowing on the north bank of the Saint Lawrence River, in the municipalities of Saint-Hilarion and Les Éboulements, in the MRC of Charlevoix Regional County Municipality, in the administrative region of Capitale-Nationale, in the province of Quebec, in Canada.

The southern part of this small valley is accessible by the chemin du 1er Rang de Saint-Hilarion and the chemin du rang Saint-Nicolas (south side of the river) of Les Éboulements. The upper part is served by Chemin Principal de Saint-Hilarion and chemin des Pins. Forestry is the main economic activity in this valley; recreational tourism, second.

The surface of the Premier Rang river is generally frozen from the beginning of December until the end of March; however, safe traffic on the ice is generally from mid-December to mid-March. The water level of the river varies with the seasons and the precipitation; the spring flood occurs in March or April.

== Geography ==
The Premier Rang river originates from Lac aux Bois Verts (length: 0.6 kilometres (0.37 mi); altitude: 347 metres (1,138 ft)), located on the south side of route 138, in a forest area. This lake has two large islands which divides it in two, forming almost a large U open to the west. This small lake is located at:

- 3.0 kilometres (1.9 mi) northeast of the village center of Saint-Hilarion;
- 4.4 kilometres (2.7 mi) north-west of the mouth of the Premier Rang river.
- 12.5 kilometres (7.8 mi) west of Saint-Irénée town center;
- 14.2 kilometres (8.8 mi) north-west of Anse de la Grosse Roche on the north-west bank of the St. Lawrence River;
- 17.8 kilometres (11.1 mi) south-west of La Malbaie town center;
- 19.7 kilometres (12.2 mi) north of downtown Baie-Saint-Paul.

From this source, the course of the Premier Rang river descends on 9.3 kilometres (5.8 mi) on an agricultural and forestry plateau, with a drop of 37 metres (121 ft), according to the following segments :

- 1.3 kilometres (0.81 mi) to the south by forming a hook towards the west, to a stream (coming from the west);
- 1.1 kilometres (0.68 mi) to the east by crossing the Principal road, collecting a stream (coming from the southwest) forming a hook towards the north to a stream (coming from the northeast);
- 2.1 kilometres (1.3 mi) south-east, up to Chemin du Premier Rang;
- 4.8 kilometres (3.0 mi) to the south, winding greatly at the start of the segment, collecting a stream (coming from the west), curving towards the south-east, then going up towards the north-east by winding in end of segment, to its mouth.

The Premier Rang river flows on the west bank of the Jean-Noël River into a forest area. This mouth is located at:

- 4.8 kilometres (3.0 mi) east of the village center of Saint-Hilarion;
- 17.9 kilometres (11.1 mi) south-west of La Malbaie town center;
- 18.1 kilometres (11.2 mi) north of downtown Baie-Saint-Paul.

== Toponymy ==
The origin of this toponymy refers to the fact that this river flows largely in the territory of the Premier Rang of Saint-Hilarion.

The toponym "Rivière du Premier Rang" was formalized on March 29, 1989 at the Place Names Bank of the Commission de toponymie du Québec.

== Appendices ==
=== Related articles ===
- Charlevoix Regional County Municipality
- Saint-Hilarion, a municipality
- Les Éboulements, a municipality
- Jean-Noël River
- St. Lawrence River
- List of rivers of Quebec
