= Jean-Noël River =

River in Charlevoix Regional County Municipality, Quebec, Canada

Jean-Noël River Old name: "Petite rivière Malbaie"
- Location within Quebec
- Native name: Rivière Jean-Noël (French)

Location
- Country: Canada
- Province: Quebec
- Region: Capitale-Nationale
- Regional County Municipality: Charlevoix Regional County Municipality and Charlevoix-Est Regional County Municipality
- Municipality: Saint-Hilarion, Les Éboulements and Saint-Irénée

Physical characteristics
- Source: Small lake in agricultural area
  - location: Saint-Hilarion
  - coordinates: 47°33′20″N 70°24′44″W
  - elevation: 407 m
- Mouth: Saint Lawrence River
  - location: Saint-Irénée
  - coordinates: 47°34′04″N 70°12′18″W
  - elevation: 3 m
- Length: 20.2 km (12.6 mi)

Basin features
- Tributaries
  - left: (Upstream from the mouth) Rivière Jean-Noël Nord-Est, five unidentified streams, Rivière du Premier Rang.
  - right: (Upstream from the mouth) Three unidentified streams, Lac de la Tourelle outlet, four unidentified streams.

The Jean-Noël River is a tributary of the north shore of the Saint Lawrence River, in the administrative region of Capitale-Nationale, in the province of Quebec, in Canada. This river flows through the regional county municipalities (MRC) of:

- Charlevoix Regional County Municipality: in the municipalities of Saint-Hilarion and Les Éboulements;
- Charlevoix-Est Regional County Municipality: in the municipality of Saint-Irénée.

The southern part of this small valley is accessible by rue Principale de Saint-Irénée and chemin du rang Saint-Pierre, which pass on the east side. The intermediate part is served by the rang Saint-Pierre road which first passes north of the river; then on the south side going west. The upper part is served by a forest road which passes on the north side of the river. Forestry and agriculture are the main economic activities in this valley; recreational tourism, second.

The surface of the Jean-Noël River is generally frozen from the beginning of December until the end of March; however, safe traffic on the ice is generally from mid-December to mid-March. The water level of the river varies with the seasons and the precipitation; the spring flood occurs in March or April.

== Geography ==
The Jean-Noël river takes its source from a small lake located on the north side of Chemin de Saint-Hilarion, in an agricultural area. This small lake is located at:

- 2.3 kilometres (1.4 mi) south of the village center of Saint-Hilarion;
- 11.3 kilometres (7.0 mi) north-west of Baie des Éboulements on the north-west bank of the St. Lawrence River;
- 14.5 kilometres (9.0 mi) north of downtown Baie-Saint-Paul;
- 15.7 kilometres (9.8 mi) south-west of the mouth of the Jean-Noël river.

From this source, the course of the Jean-Noël river descends on 20.2 kilometres (12.6 mi), with a drop of 404 metres (1,325 ft), according to the following segments:

- 34 kilometres (21 mi) towards the east by forming a large loop towards the south-east, until the discharge (coming from the north-west) of an unidentified lake;
- 3.1 kilometres (1.9 mi) towards the east by forming a curve towards the south and collecting a stream (coming from the northwest), up to a stream (coming from the southeast) whose l 'mouth is located on the north side of Chemin Saint-Nicolas;
- 32 kilometres (20 mi) to the north, forming small streamers, until the confluence of the rivière du Premier Rang (coming from the southwest);
- 25 kilometres (16 mi) towards the northeast, winding heavily at the start of the segment, collecting a stream (coming from the southeast), up to the outlet (coming from the northwest) d 'a set of small lakes;
- 18 kilometres (11 mi) towards the north-east by forming two loops towards the south, by collecting the outlet (coming from the south) of Lac de la Tourelle, by cutting the path of the 1st range, by collecting a stream (coming from the northwest) forming a loop towards the south along the chemin du rang Saint-Nicolas, to another stream (coming from the northwest);
- 2.8 kilometres (1.7 mi) towards the north-east, crossing almost continuously crossing rapids, until the confluence of the rivière Jean-Noël Nord-Est (coming from the north-west);
- 3.4 kilometres (2.1 mi) eastward in a deep valley, crossing several series of rapids, crossing the route 362 and cutting the railway which runs along the shore of the St. Lawrence River, to its mouth.

The Jean-Noël river flows on the northwest shore of the Estuary of Saint Lawrence, in the heart of the village of Saint-Irénée. This mouth is located at:

- 10.4 kilometres (6.5 mi) south of downtown La Malbaie;
- 26.7 kilometres (16.6 mi) north-east of downtown Baie-Saint-Paul;
- 14.6 kilometres (9.1 mi) north-east of the center of the village of Saint-Hilarion.

== Toponymy ==
This toponym evokes the first name of one of the pioneers of Saint-Irénée.

The toponym "Rivière Jean-Noël" was formalized on December 5, 1968 at the Place Names Bank of the Commission de toponymie du Québec.

== Appendices ==
=== Related articles ===
- Charlevoix Regional County Municipality
- Charlevoix-Est Regional County Municipality
- Saint-Hilarion, a municipality
- Les Éboulements, a municipality
- Saint-Irénée, a municipality
- Rivière Jean-Noël Nord-Est
- Rivière du Premier Rang
- St. Lawrence River
- List of rivers of Quebec
