= Saint-Irénée (disambiguation) =

Saint-Irénée is a municipality in Quebec, Canada.

== See also ==
- Saint Irénée and Alderwood, a former local service district in New Brunswick
