= Senhor =

Portuguese word

Senhor (Portuguese pronunciation: [sɨˈɲoɾ, siˈɲoʁ], abb. Sr.; plural: senhores, abb. Sr.^{es} or Srs.), from the Latin Senior (comparative of Senex, "old man"), is the Portuguese word for lord, sir or mister. Its feminine form is senhora (pronounced [sɨˈɲoɾɐ, siˈɲoɾɐ], abb. Sr.^{a} or Sra.; plural: senhoras, abb. Sr.^{as} or Sras.). The term is related to Spanish señor, Catalan senyor, Occitan sénher, French seigneur, and Italian signore.

Originally it was only used to designate a feudal lord or sire, as well as being one of the names of God. With time its usage spread and, as means of differentiation, noble people began to use Senhor Dom X (as when referring to the kings or members of the high nobility), which translates literally in English as "The Lord, Lord X".

In 1597, King Philip I issued a decree standardizing the noble styles in use in the Kingdom of Portugal. Sua Senhoria (translated as His Lordship or Her Ladyship) was the prescribed manner of address to archbishops (with the exception of the Archbishop of Braga who, due to his rank as Primate of Hispania, was entitled to the style of Sua Senhoria Reverendíssima, or His Most Reverend Lordship), bishops, dukes (with the exception of the Duke of Braganza, who was to be addressed as Sua Excelência, Your Excellency, same as the King's grandchildren) and their children, marquesses, counts, the Prior of Crato, viceroys and governors (when not related to the King), and other high authorities of the Kingdom (such as judges or ambassadors). After 1739, as Grandees (dukes, marquesses, counts) were given the style of address of Sua Excelência, the use of Sua Senhoria became restricted to address the lesser ranks of titled nobility (viscounts and barons), the legitimate sons and daughters of titled nobility, occupants of some offices at court, diplomats, some other authorities, and canons.

Presently it is used in the same context as mister (senhor Silva, or Sr. Silva, meaning "Mr. Silva"), or as a way of saying a formal "you" (O senhor tem uma casa meaning "You (male) have a house"). In formal contexts o senhor, a senhora, os senhores and as senhoras (masculine singular, feminine singular, masculine plural, and feminine plural "you", respectively) are preferred. However, there is considerable regional variation in the use of these terms, and more specific forms of address are sometimes employed. O senhor and a senhora are the most ceremonious forms of address. English speakers may find the latter construction akin to the parliamentary convention of referring to fellow legislators in the third person (as "my colleague", "the gentleman", "the member", etc.), although the level of formality conveyed by o senhor is not as great. In fact, variants of o senhor and a senhora with more nuanced meanings such as o professor ("professor"), o colega ("colleague") and o pai ("father") are also employed as personal pronouns. Often senhor is followed by another title or job description, such as doctor (senhor doutor), engineer (senhor engenheiro), teacher or professor (senhor professor), or police officer (senhor polícia), thus conveying a high level of formality.

Traditionally, but not presently, the feminine form senhora was only used for a married woman (a single woman was addressed formally as menina, "young girl", in Portugal or by the diminutive senhorita, "little lady", in Brazil).

== See also ==
- Portuguese name
- Portuguese personal pronouns
- Senhor (magazine)
- T-V distinction
- Style (manner of address)
- Dom (title)
- Don (honorific)
- Gentleman
- Lord
- Monsieur
- Mr.
- Seigneur (disambiguation)
- Sir
