= Domaine Forget =

Le Domaine Forget de Charlevoix
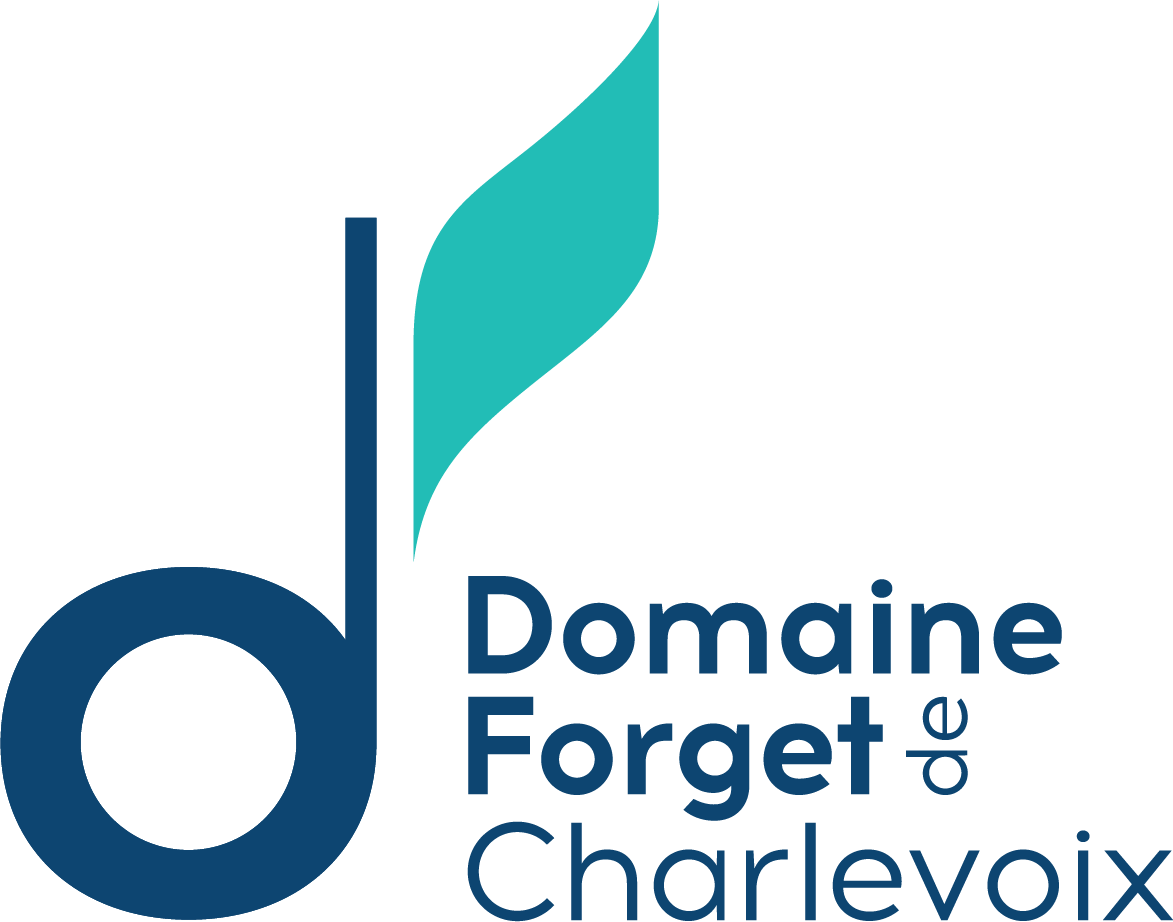
- Formation: 1977; 49 years ago
- Type: Non-profit organization
- Purpose: Music, Dance, Sculpture, Nature
- Location: Saint-Irénée
- Coordinates: 47°33′49″N 70°12′29″W
- Region served: Charlevoix, Quebec, Canada
- President: Louise St-Pierre
- General Director: Ginette Gauthier
- Artistic Director: Paul Fortin
- Website: domaineforget.com

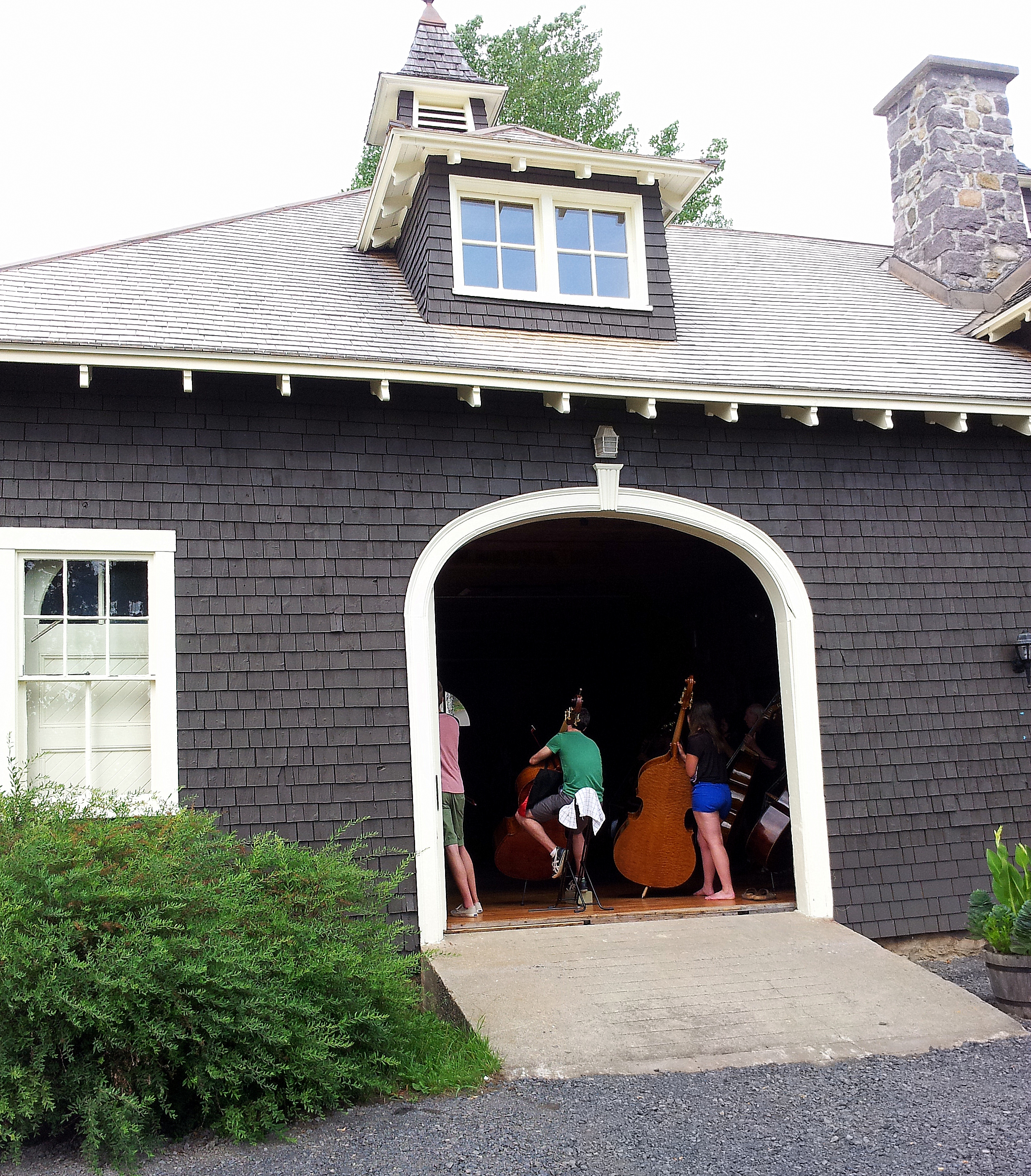
Masterclasses in L'Écurie

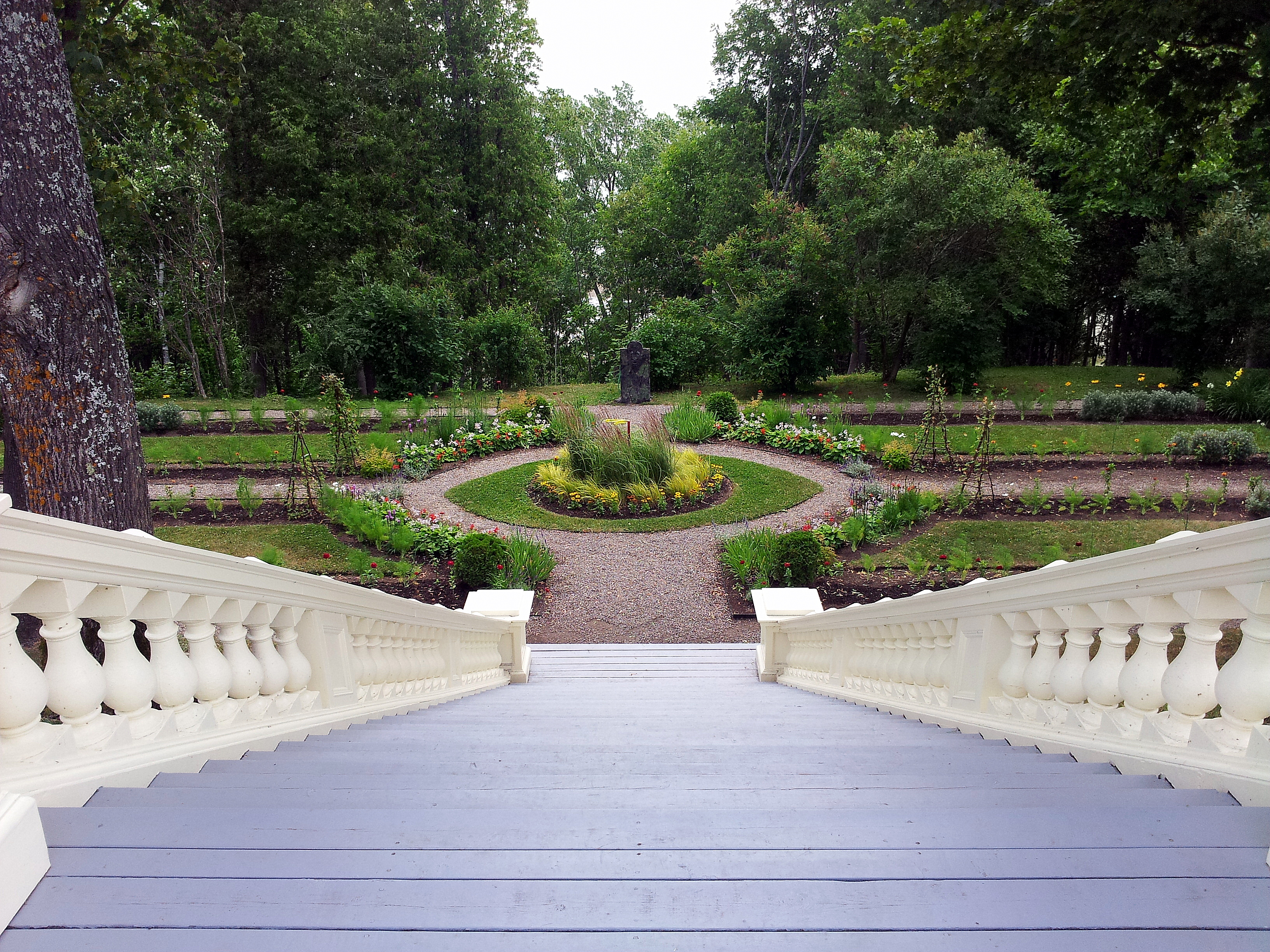
French Garden

Le Domaine Forget de Charlevoix [lə dɔ.mɛn fɔʁ.ʒe də ʃaʁ.lə.vwa] is an international music festival and a music and dance academy in Charlevoix, Quebec. The domain is a operated by a non-profit organization occupying a large set of land and buildings located in Saint-Irénée, near La Malbaie. Concerts take place in the Concert Hall. Since the concert hall opened in 1996, it has also hosted a variety program.

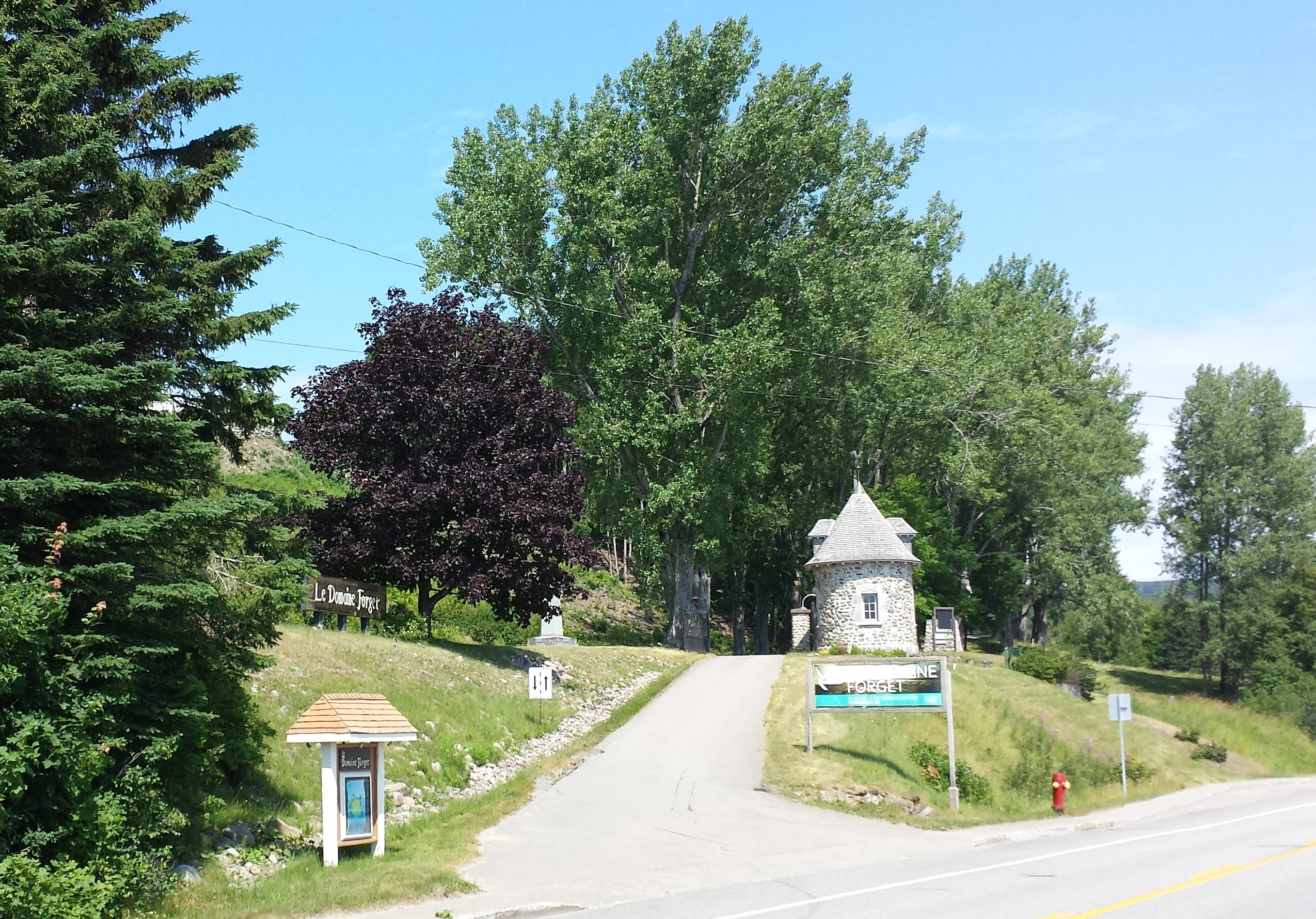
Main entry of Domaine Forget

== History ==
At the turn of the 20th century, Domaine Forget was three separate estates owned by three eminent Canadians. Les Sablons was owned by Joseph Lavergne, a judge and colleague of Sir Wilfrid Laurier; Hauterive was the property of Adolphe-Basile Routhier, a judge and the lyricist of the French-language version of O Canada. Gil'Mont, which forms the major part of the property, was the estate of Rodolphe Forget, a Member of Parliament and investor and entrepreneur in the Charlevoix region.

In 1945, Les Petites Franciscaines de Marie, a religious order, first purchased Gil'Mont as the school "Institut Familial" (Family Institute), and a year later bought the properties belonging to Judges Laverge and Routhier in order to protect the privacy of the educational institution. In 1977, the school was converted into what is now known as Le Domaine Forget, a non-profit corporation with a mission of promoting music and dance.

== International Festival ==
The festival features dance, jazz, and most prominently classical music. Concerts run from June to September and feature well-known artists from all over the world.

The festival concerts take place almost exclusively in the 600-seat Concert Hall, which was built in 1996 by Le Domaine Forget and is known for its remarkable acoustics.

== International Music and Dance Academy ==
The academy plays host to a number of different masterclass sessions: Brass. Composition, Piano, Chamber Music, Voice & Vocal Accompaniment, Guitar, Dance, Strings, Conducting, String Ensemble and Choir. All occur at different times of the summer and fall and feature faculty from around Quebec, Canada, and the world. Domaine features the Paul-Lafleur Pavilion, a complex of double-occupancy rooms with 1 shared bathroom per 4 people and a recently renovated dormitory. At the end of each session, a public concert is offered featuring student performances.

== Notable International Festival performers ==
- Violinist Martin Beaver
- Clarinetist Jonathan Cohler
- Oboist Hansjörg Schellenberger
- Pianist Oliver Jones
- Pianist Gabriela Montero
- Jazz Guitarist and Vocalist John Pizzarelli
- Bassist François Rabbath
- Hornist James Sommerville
- Conductor Benjamin Zander
- Violinist, Violist, and Conductor Pinchas Zukerman
- National Youth Orchestra of Canada
- Orchestre Symphonique de Québec
- Youth Orchestra of the Americas

== Notable International Music and Dance Academy teachers ==
- Violist Atar Arad
- Tubist Roger Bobo
- Trombonist James Box
- Clarinetist Jonathan Cohler
- Clarinetist Larry Combs
- Bassoonist Daniele Damiano
- Oboist Elaine Douvas
- Jazz Trumpeter Tiger Okoshi
- Violist James Dunham
- Bassist Paul Ellison
- Cellist Matt Haimovitz
- Flutist Jeffrey Khaner
- Cellist Hans Jorgen Jensen
- Trumpeter Jens Lindemann
- Violinist Darren Lowe
- Clarinetist Jean-François Normand
- Flutist Emmanuel Pahud
- Violinist Régis Pasquier
- Bassist François Rabbath
- Oboist Hansjörg Schellenberger
- Hornist James Sommerville
- Trombonist Peter Sullivan
- Hornist Barry Tuckwell
- Hornist Radovan Vlatkovic
- Trumpeter James Watson
- Hornist Gail Williams
- Hornist Froydis Ree Wekre
- Guitarist Fabio Zanon

== See also ==
- Saint-Irénée, a municipality
