= Rivière du Sault (Charlevoix) =

River in Charlevoix Regional County Municipality, Quebec, Canada

Rivière du Sault Old name: Ruisseau du Sault (French) and Ruisseau du Sot (French)
- Location within Quebec

Location
- Country: Canada
- Province: Quebec
- Region: Capitale-Nationale
- Regional County Municipality: Charlevoix Regional County Municipality
- Municipality: Petite-Rivière-Saint-François

Physical characteristics
- Source: Lake in mountain
  - location: Petite-Rivière-Saint-François
  - coordinates: 47°18′14″N 70°38′08″W
  - elevation: 668 m
- Mouth: Ruisseau de la Martine
  - location: Petite-Rivière-Saint-François
  - coordinates: 47°20′50″N 70°33′35″W
  - elevation: 108 m
- Length: 12.0 km (7.5 mi)

The rivière du Sault (English: Sault River) is a tributary of the west bank of the ruisseau de la Martine on the northwest bank of the Saint-Laurent River. This river flows in the municipality of Petite-Rivière-Saint-François, in the Charlevoix Regional County Municipality, in the region Capitale-Nationale, in the province of Quebec, in Canada.

The route 138 runs along the west side of the upper part of this small valley. While the main street of Petite-Rivière-Saint-François descends the mountain on the northeast side of the course of this river. The economic activities of this valley are concentrated on the bank of the river where recreational tourism activities (notably vacationing) are developed. In addition, the peaks and flanks of the surrounding mountains are used for recreational tourism activities, in particular the important alpine ski center of the "Massif de Charlevoix" which is located very close to the east side of the upper part of this river and whose side of the mountain built for alpine skiing faces the river.

The surface of the lower part of the Sault River is generally frozen from the beginning of December until the end of March, except the backwater zones; however, safe traffic on the ice is generally from mid-December to mid-March. The upper part has an additional week's freezing period. The water level of the river varies with the seasons and the precipitation; the spring flood occurs in March or April.

== Geography ==
The Sault river rises at the mouth of a small lake (length: 1.4 kilometres (0.87 mi); altitude: 684 metres (2,244 ft)), on the north side of a summit of mountain in the municipality of Petite-Rivière-Saint-François. This source is located at:

- 0.6 kilometres (0.37 mi) east of route 138 which moves 5 to 6 kilometers away from the St. Lawrence River in this area;
- 1.7 kilometres (1.1 mi) west of the top of the Mountain in Liguori (altitude: 820 metres (2,690 ft));
- 5.1 kilometres (3.2 mi) south-west of the village center of Petite-Rivière-Saint-François;
- 18.2 kilometres (11.3 mi) south of downtown Baie-Saint-Paul;
- 20.7 kilometres (12.9 mi) north of downtown Saint-Tite-des-Caps.

From its source, the course of this river descends on 12.0 kilometres (7.5 mi) with a drop of 560 metres (1,840 ft), according to the following segments:

- 7.4 kilometres (4.6 mi) towards the north in an increasingly deep valley, along more or less the route 138 by its east side, up to a bend of river corresponding to the discharge of a stream (coming from the northwest);
- 4.6 kilometres (2.9 mi) towards the East by forming a curve towards the north at the start of the segment to go around a mountain, with a drop of 212 metres (696 ft) in a deep valley and collecting "Le Gros Ruisseau" (coming from the southwest), to its mouth.

The Sault River flows on the northwest shore of the St. Lawrence River, in the municipality of Petite-Rivière-Saint-François. This confluence is located at:

- 1.6 kilometres (0.99 mi) west of the shore of the St. Lawrence River;
- 4.5 kilometres (2.8 mi) north of the village center of Petite-Rivière-Saint-François;
- 3.7 kilometres (2.3 mi) south-east of route 138;
- 1.7 kilometres (1.1 mi) north-west of the hamlet "Maillard".

From the confluence of the Sault River, the current flows over 2.3 kilometres (1.4 mi) generally towards the south-east by the course of the ruisseau de la Martine by cutting the Principale street from Petite-Rivière-Saint-François and the railway, to the northwest shore of the St. Lawrence River.

== Toponymy ==
This river is designated "Rivière du Sault" (today "Ruisseau de la Martine") by the cartographer Joseph Bouchette, on his topographic maps of 1815 and 1831. The acronym "Ruisseau du Sot" later becomes usage to designate this watercourse; this variant reflects the spelling used in Bouchette's time. It refers to a sault which is defined as a more or less significant slope break.

The toponym "rivière du Sault" was formalized on November 13, 2006 at the Place Names Bank of the Commission de toponymie du Québec.

== See also ==
- Capitale-Nationale, an administrative region
- Charlevoix Regional County Municipality
- Petite-Rivière-Saint-François, a municipality
- Ruisseau de la Martine
- St. Lawrence River
- List of rivers of Quebec
