= Seigneur (disambiguation) =

Seigneur (English: Lord), was the name formerly given in France to someone who had been granted a seigneurie (fief) by the crown, with all its associated rights over person and property.

Seigneur may also refer to:

- The seigneurial system of New France
- The hereditary feudal ruler of the island of Sark (see list of seigneurs of Sark)
- Eddy Seigneur (born 1969), French road racing cyclist
- Rivière du Seigneur, a tributary of St. Lawrence River in Les Éboulements, Charlevoix Regional County Municipality, Capitale-Nationale, Quebec, Canada
