= Jean-Noël Crocq =

French musician

Jean-Noël Crocq (born 15 March 1948 in Rennes) is a French classical clarinetist.

Crocq studied at the Conservatoire de Paris. He created Le clarinettiste débutant, a book of sheet music for beginning clarinetists. In 1974, he became the solo bass clarinetist for the Orchestra of l'Opéra national de Paris. He became the first professor of bass clarinet at Conservatoire de Paris in 1991. He is the president of Association Papageno, a chamber music advocacy group. He also collaborates with Buffet Crampon.
