= Rivière Jean-Noël Nord-Est =

River in Charlevoix-Est Regional County Municipality, Quebec, Canada

- Location within Quebec

Location
- Country: Canada
- Province: Quebec
- Region: Capitale-Nationale
- Regional County Municipality: Charlevoix-Est Regional County Municipality
- Municipality: La Malbaie and Saint-Irénée

Physical characteristics
- Source: Small lake in agricultural and forest area
  - location: La Malbaie
  - coordinates: 47°38′32″N 70°20′29″W
  - elevation: 439 m
- Mouth: Jean-Noël River
  - location: Saint-Irénée
  - coordinates: 47°34′53″N 70°13′58″W
  - elevation: 101 m
- Length: 14.1 km (8.8 mi)

Basin features
- Tributaries
  - left: Four unidentified streams
  - right: (Upstream from the mouth) Four unidentified streams, Mules stream, two unidentified streams.

The Jean-Noël Nord-Est River is a tributary of the north bank of the Jean-Noël River, flowing in the town of La Malbaie and the municipality of Saint-Irénée, in Charlevoix-Est Regional County Municipality, in the administrative region of Capitale-Nationale, in province of Quebec, in Canada.

The southern part of this small valley is accessible by the rang Saint-Pierre road, which runs on the northeast side of the river. The intermediate part is served by chemin du rang Saint-Pierre and chemin Saint-Louis. The upper part is served by route 138, chemin du rang Sainte-Philomène and chemin du rang Saint-Louis. Forestry is the main economic activity in this valley; recreational tourism activities, second; agriculture, third.

The surface of the Jean-Noël Nord-Est river is generally frozen from the beginning of December until the end of March; however, safe traffic on the ice is generally from mid-December to mid-March. The water level of the river varies with the seasons and the precipitation; the spring flood occurs in March or April.

== Geography ==
The Jean-Noël Nord-Est river takes its source from a small lake (altitude: 439 metres (1,440 ft)) located on the northwest side of the Saint-Jean-Baptiste road, in agricultural and forestry areas. This small lake is wedged between the Montagne de Saint-Jean-Baptiste (located on the south side of the lake) and the Montagne à Joseph-à-Johnny (on the west side). This small lake is located at:

- 3.9 kilometres (2.4 mi) east of the village center of Notre-Dame-des-Monts;
- 13.6 kilometres (8.5 mi) west of the northwest shore of the St. Lawrence River;
- 14.5 kilometres (9.0 mi) south-west of downtown Baie-Saint-Paul;
- 13.2 kilometres (8.2 mi) south-west of the mouth of the Jean-Noël River.

From this source, the course of the Jean-Noël Nord-Est river descends on 14.1 kilometres (8.8 mi), with a drop of 338 metres (1,109 ft), according to the following segments:

- 3.4 kilometres (2.1 mi) to the east and forming a large curve to the north and crossing route 138, to a stream (coming from the north);
- 2.3 kilometres (1.4 mi) towards the south-east, then curving towards the south, up to the brook of Mules (coming from the south-west);
- 11 kilometres (6.8 mi) to the east, forming small streamers, to a stream (coming from the southwest) which constitutes the outlet of Lac Amédée;
- 5.4 kilometres (3.4 mi) to the east in the forest and agricultural zone by forming small streamers at the start of the segment and by forming a curve towards the south, up to the bridge on Chemin Saint-Pierre;
- 1.9 kilometres (1.2 mi) to the south-east in an agricultural area in an increasingly deep valley, to its mouth.

The Jean-Noël Nord-Est river flows on the north bank of the Jean-Noël river, northwest of the village of Saint-Irénée. This mouth is located at:

- 25 kilometres (16 mi) east of the confluence of the Jean-Noël river with the Saint Lawrence River;
- 10.2 kilometres (6.3 mi) south of downtown La Malbaie;
- 25.9 kilometres (16.1 mi) north-east of downtown Baie-Saint-Paul.

== Toponymy ==
This toponym evokes the first name of one of the pioneers of Saint-Irénée. This toponym is designated in a cardinal way according to the toponymic designation of its master watercourse, the Jean-Noël river.

The toponym "Rivière Jean-Noël" was formalized on December 5, 1968 at the Place Names Bank of the Commission de toponymie du Québec.

== Appendices ==
=== Related articles ===
- Charlevoix-Est Regional County Municipality
- La Malbaie, a city
- Saint-Irénée, a municipality
- Jean-Noël River
- St. Lawrence River
- List of rivers of Quebec
