= Ruisseau de la Martine =

River in Charlevoix Regional County Municipality, Quebec, Canada

- Location within Quebec

Location
- Country: Canada
- Province: Quebec
- Region: Capitale-Nationale
- Regional County Municipality: Charlevoix Regional County Municipality
- Municipality: Petite-Rivière-Saint-François

Physical characteristics
- Source: Confluence of Rivière du Sault and a stream
  - location: Petite-Rivière-Saint-François
  - coordinates: 47°20′50″N 70°33′35″W
  - elevation: 108 m
- Mouth: Saint Lawrence River
  - location: Petite-Rivière-Saint-François
  - coordinates: 47°20′50″N 70°33′35″W
  - elevation: 4 m
- Length: 2.3 km (1.4 mi)

The ruisseau de la Martine (English: Martine stream) is a tributary of the northwest shore of the St. Lawrence River. This river flows in the municipality of Petite-Rivière-Saint-François, in the Charlevoix Regional County Municipality, in the region Capitale-Nationale, in the province of Quebec, in Canada.

This valley is served by rue Principale de Petite-Rivière-Saint-François, which runs along the Saint-Laurent river to the west of the mouth of the Martine stream and then goes up the latter valley and the river valley from Sault. The economic activities of this valley are concentrated on the bank of the river where recreational tourism activities (notably vacationing) are developed. In addition, the peaks and flanks of the surrounding mountains are used for recreational tourism activities, in particular the important alpine ski center of Massif of Charlevoix which is located very close to the south side of this river and whose flank the mountain for alpine skiing faces the river.

The surface of the Martine stream is generally frozen from the beginning of December until the end of March, except the eddy areas; however, safe traffic on the ice is generally from mid-December to mid-March. The water level of the river varies with the seasons and the precipitation; the spring flood occurs in March or April.

== Geography ==
The Martine stream rises at a bend in the river where there is the confluence of the Sault river (coming from the east) and a stream (coming from the north), in the municipality of Petite-Rivière-Saint-François. This source is located at:

- 3 kilometres (1.9 mi) south of downtown Baie-Saint-Paul;
- 4.5 kilometres (2.8 mi) west of the center of the village of Petite-Rivière-Saint-François;
- 3.7 kilometres (2.3 mi) east of route 138 which is 5 to 6 kilometers away at this point on the St. Lawrence River.

From its source, the course of this river descends on 2.3 kilometres (1.4 mi) towards the south-east, bending towards the east at the end of the segment, with a drop of 104 metres (341 ft), by cutting Principale Street and the railway which runs along the river, to its mouth.

The Martine stream flows onto the northwest shore of the St. Lawrence River, on the "Pointe de la Rivière" (peninsula) in the hamlet Maillard, in the municipality of Petite-Rivière-Saint-François. This confluence is located at:

- 1.7 kilometres (1.1 mi) west of the northwest shore of the St. Lawrence River;
- 4.5 kilometres (2.8 mi) north of the center of the village of Petite-Rivière-Saint-François;
- 5.9 kilometres (3.7 mi) east of route 138;
- north of the hamlet of Grande-Pointe.

== Toponymy ==
The toponymic designation "Martine stream" was listed in 1976 to define the lower segment. This river is designated "Rivière du Sault" (today "Ruisseau de la Martine") by the cartographer Joseph Bouchette, on his topographic maps of 1815 and 1831. The acronym "Ruisseau du Sot" later becomes usage to designate this watercourse; this variant reflects the spelling used in Bouchette's time. It refers to a sault which is defined as a more or less significant slope break or a fall.

The toponym "Petite rivière Saint-François" was formalized on August 17, 1978, at the Place Names Bank of the Commission de toponymie du Québec.

== See also ==
- Charlevoix Regional County Municipality
- Petite-Rivière-Saint-François, a municipality
- Le Massif
- Rivière du Sault (Charlevoix)
- St. Lawrence River
- List of rivers of Quebec
