= Quebec Route 362 =

Highway in Quebec, Canada

Route 362

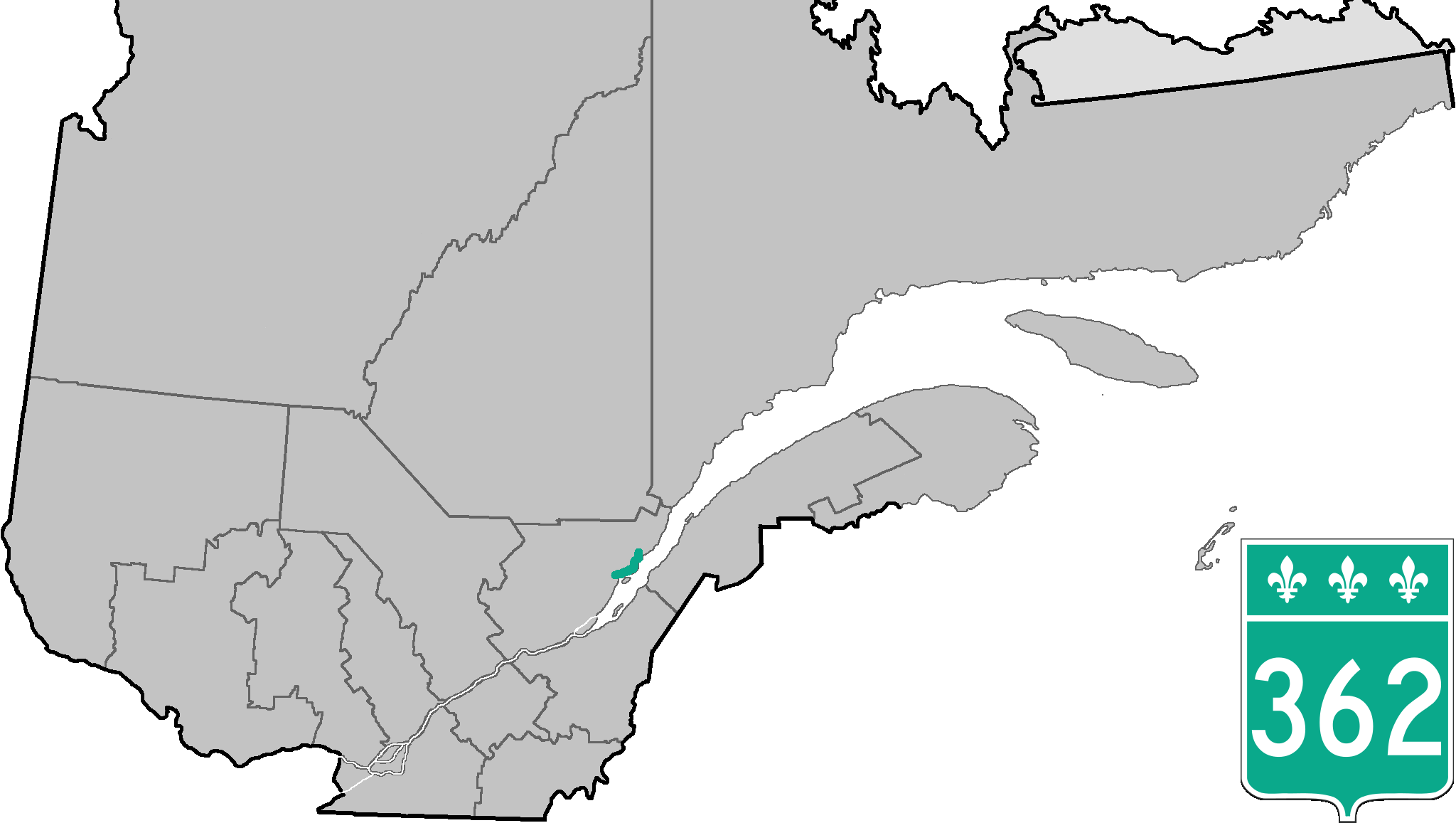

Route information
- Maintained by Transports Québec
- Length: 50 km (31 mi)

Major junctions
- West end: R-138 in Baie-Saint-Paul
- East end: R-138 in La Malbaie

Location
- Country: Canada
- Province: Quebec
- Major cities: Baie-Saint-Paul, Les Éboulements, La Malbaie

Highway system
- Quebec provincial highways; Autoroutes; List; Former
← R-361	→ R-363

Route 362 is a scenic 50 km two-lane highway which follows the Saint Lawrence River in the Charlevoix region in Quebec, Canada. It starts at the junction of Route 138 in Baie-Saint-Paul and ends again at the junction of Route 138 in La Malbaie. Route 138 provides a more direct link between those two towns, and Route 362 is mainly a touristic route with vistas of the Saint Lawrence River, and the road goes up and down some serious hills next to the river.

== Towns along Route 362 ==
- Baie-Saint-Paul
- Saint-Joseph-de-la-Rive
- Les Éboulements
- Saint-Irénée
- La Malbaie

== See also ==
- List of Quebec provincial highways
