= Saint-Irénée =

- Municipality
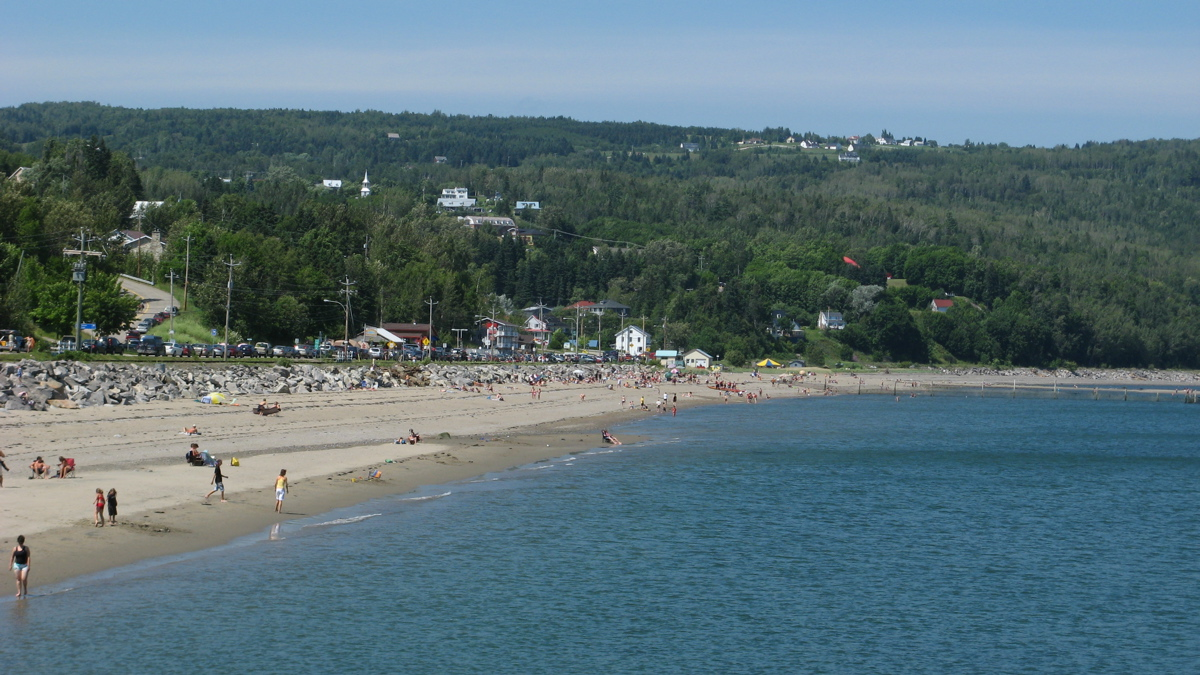
- Beach of Saint-Irénée

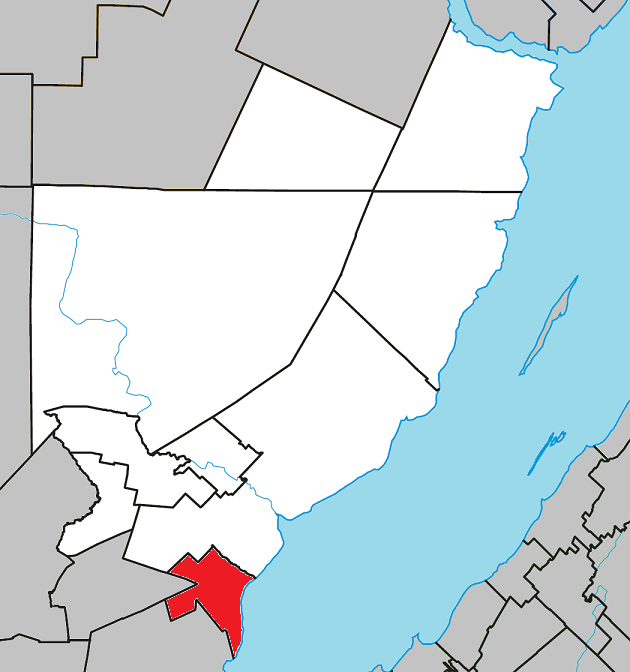
- Location within Charlevoix-Est RCM

- Location in central Quebec
- Coordinates: 47°34′N 70°12′W
- Country: Canada
- Province: Quebec
- Region: Capitale-Nationale
- RCM: Charlevoix-Est
- Constituted: July 1, 1855

Government
  - Mayor: Michel Gauthier
  - Federal riding: Montmorency—Charlevoix
  - Prov. riding: Charlevoix–Côte-de-Beaupré

Area
  - Total: 154.39 km^{2} (59.61 sq mi)
  - Land: 59.92 km^{2} (23.14 sq mi)

Population (2021)
  - Total: 678
  - Density: 11.3/km^{2} (29/sq mi)
  - Pop (2016-21): ▲5.8%
  - Dwellings: 482
- Time zone: UTC−5 (EST)
  - Summer (DST): UTC−4 (EDT)
- Postal code(s): G0T 1V0
- Area codes: 418 and 581
- Highways: R-362
- Website: www.saintirenee.ca

Saint-Irénée (French pronunciation: [sɛ̃t‿iʁene]) is a municipality in the Capitale-Nationale region of Quebec, Canada.

The municipality is home to the Charlevoix Airport and Domaine Forget, an international education institution in music and dance. In addition to the main namesake population centre, the municipality also contains the hamlets of L'Anse-au-Sac (47°31′16″N 70°12′32″W), Le Cap-Blanc (47°35′28″N 70°11′01″W), Rochette (47°34′49″N 70°15′47″W), and Ruisseau-Jureux (47°32′18″N 70°12′12″W).

== History ==
Settlement began in 1832, and the parish was founded in 1840, named after Saint Irenaeus. The first resident priest was Father Charles Pouliot, and the area had a population of around 800 at the time. In 1845, the Municipality of Saint Irénée was created but abolished two years later. In 1852, its post office opened. The current municipality of Saint-Irénée was officially created on 1 July 1855.. The population was 1,060 in 1861 and was divided among about a hundred families, according to the findings of French consul Charles-Henri-Philippe Gauldrée-Boilleau, who conducted a sociological survey of peasant families there. Among other things, he noted certain peculiarities in the language of the locals, such as saying ‘espérez un instant’ (wait a moment) instead of ‘attendez un instant’ (wait a moment) or ‘c'est de valeur’ (it's valuable) in response to a chance event.

At the turn of the 20th century, Judge Adolphe-Basile Routhier, who also wrote the lyrics to Canada's national anthem, and businessman and financier Rodolphe Forget owned summer estates facing the river, in the area now occupied by Domaine Forget. Forget owned a sumptuous estate called Gil'Mont (destroyed by fire in 1965) where his daughter, politician Thérèse Casgrain, spent many summers, as she recounted in her autobiography. The municipality has been connected to La Malbaie and Quebec City by the Charlevoix Railway since 1919. A credit union was established there in 1945 and Charlevoix Airport in 1962.

In 2021, the parish municipality changed statutes to become a regular municipality.

== Demographics ==
Historical Census Data - Saint-Irénée, Quebec

Year	Pop.	±%
1861	998	—
1871	997	−0.1%
1881	1,082	+8.5%
1891	1,152	+6.5%
1901	1,059	−8.1%
1911	1,290	+21.8%
1921	1,052	−18.4%
1931	996	−5.3%

Year	Pop.	±%
1941	1,140	+14.5%
1951	1,069	−6.2%
1956	1,027	−3.9%
1961	1,199	+16.7%
1966	947	−21.0%
1971	857	−9.5%
1976	789	−7.9%
1981	789	+0.0%

Year	Pop.	±%
1986	785	−0.5%
1991	745	−5.1%
1996	643	−13.7%
2001	672	+4.5%
2006	727	+8.2%
2011	674	−7.3%
2016	641	−4.9%
2021	678	+5.8%

Source: Statistics Canada

Private dwellings occupied by usual residents (2021): 333 (total dwellings: 482)

=== Language ===
Mother tongue (2021):

- English as first language: 0.7%
- French as first language: 97.8%
- English and French as first language: 0%
- Other as first language: 0.7%

== Notable people ==
- Thérèse Casgrain (1896-1981), senator
- Rodolphe Forget (1861-1919)
- Armand Lavergne (1880-1935) - owned a home in Saint-Irénée-les-Bains
- Adolphe-Basile Routhier (1839-1920) - owned a home in Saint-Irénée-les-Bains

== See also ==
- Jean-Noël River
- Rivière Jean-Noël Nord-Est
- List of municipalities in Quebec
