= Les Éboulements =

- Municipality
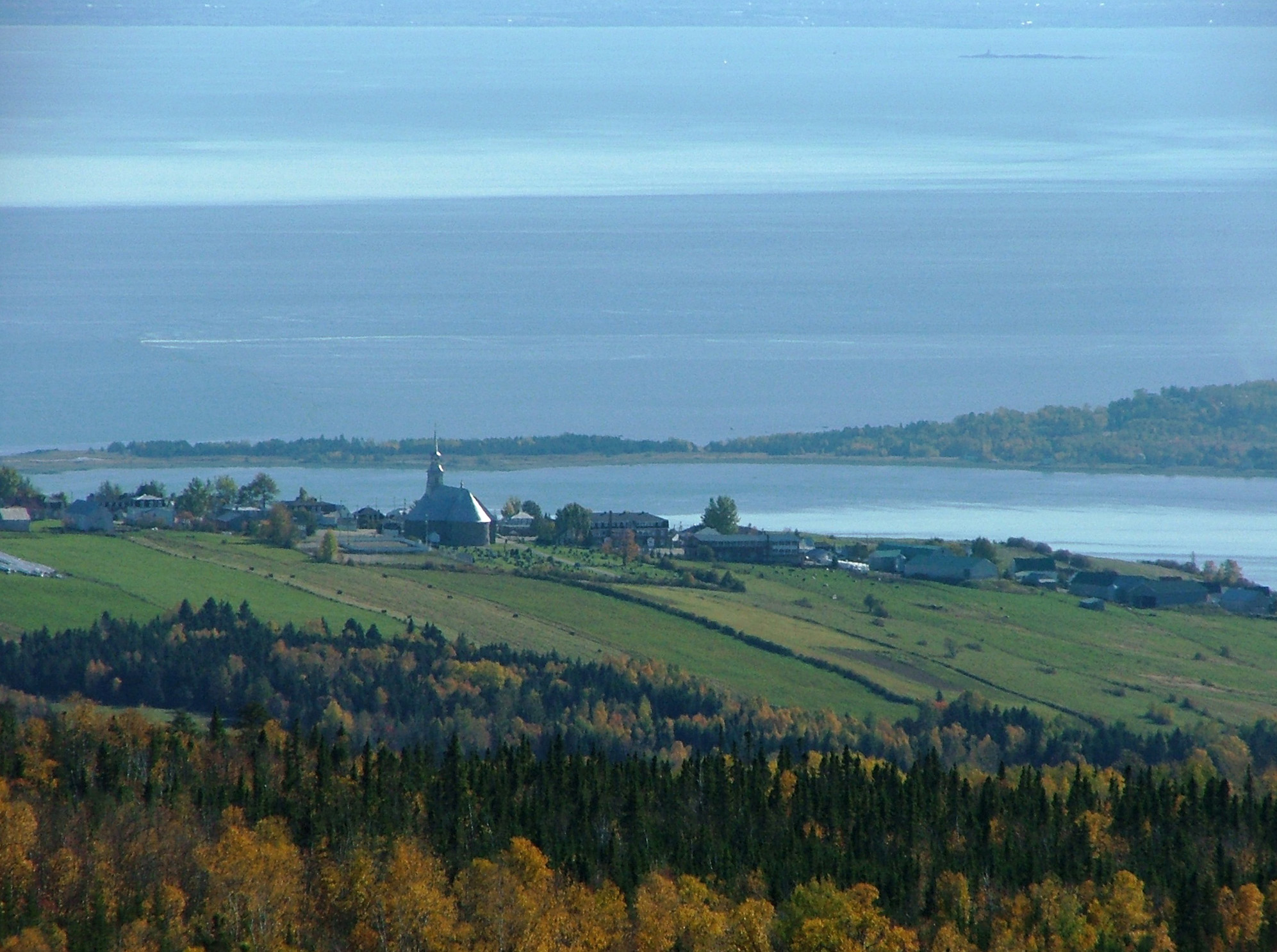

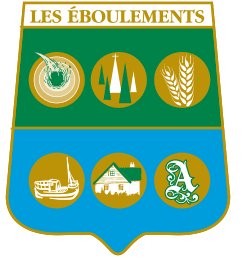
- Coat of arms

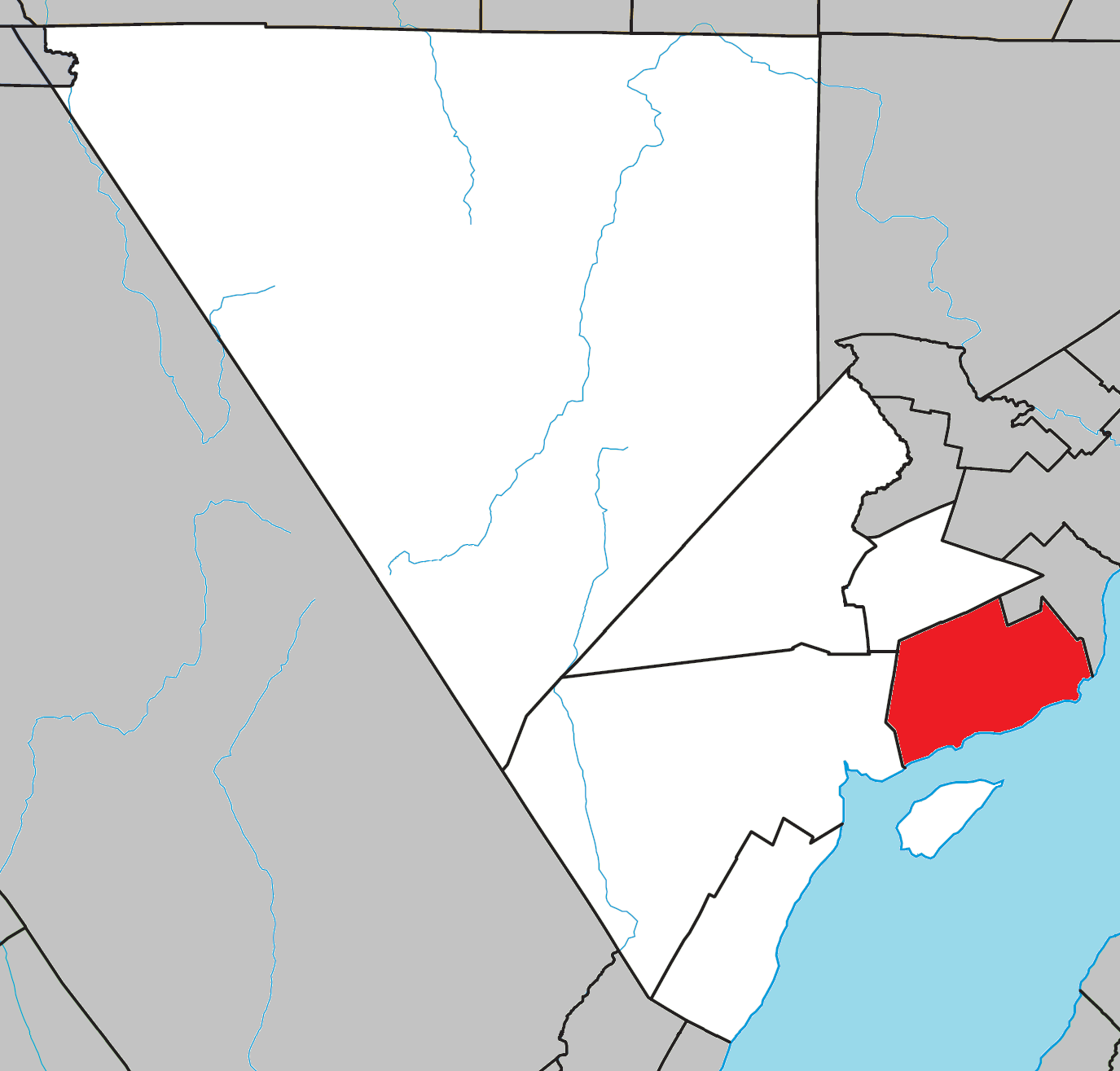
- Location within Charlevoix RCM

- Location in central Quebec
- Coordinates: 47°29′N 70°19′W
- Country: Canada
- Province: Quebec
- Region: Capitale-Nationale
- RCM: Charlevoix
- Settled: c. 1710
- Constituted: September 19, 2001

Government
  - Mayor: Emmanuel Deschênes
  - Federal riding: Montmorency—Charlevoix
  - Prov. riding: Charlevoix–Côte-de-Beaupré

Area
  - Total: 157.28 km^{2} (60.73 sq mi)
  - Land: 156.19 km^{2} (60.31 sq mi)
- Elevation: 365 m (1,198 ft)

Population (2021)
  - Total: 1,465
  - Density: 9.4/km^{2} (24/sq mi)
  - Pop (2016-21): ▲10.1%
  - Dwellings: 925
- Time zone: UTC−5 (EST)
  - Summer (DST): UTC−4 (EDT)
- Postal code(s): G0A 2M0
- Area codes: 418 and 581
- Highways: R-362
- Website: www.leseboulements.com

Les Éboulements (French pronunciation: [lez‿ebulmɑ̃]) is a municipality in the Capitale-Nationale region of Quebec, Canada.

Its population centres include Les Éboulements (located along Route 362 on the plateau overlooking the Saint Lawrence River), Éboulements-Est (at the feet of Mount Éboulements), Cap-aux-Oies, Sainte-Marie-de-Charlevoix, and Saint-Joseph-de-la-Rive (on the shores of the Saint Lawrence facing Saint-Bernard-sur-Mer). Saint-Joseph-de-la-Rive, formerly known as Les Éboulements-en-Bas and Quai-des-Éboulements, is the departure point for ferries to L'Isle-aux-Coudres.

The municipality is member of the Association of Most Beautiful Villages of Quebec due to its country heritage and to the beautiful architecture and character of its houses.

== History ==
In February 1663, a strong earthquake shook the Charlevoix region and triggered a large landslide down the slopes that characterize the hills of the area to the Saint Lawrence coast. Among the many eyewitnesses that testified to the significance of the event, Gabriel Lalement wrote: "near the Bay called St. Paul, there was a small mountain alongside the river, a quarter of a league in circumference, which was abyssed, and as if it had not done that dive, it came out of the bottom to change into an islet." Thereafter the area was known as les Éboulements (French for "the landslides").

On April 1, 1683, the Éboulements Seignory was granted to Pierre Lessard by Governor La Barre and Intendant de Meulles, having an area of 1¼ league wide by 2 leagues deep. In 1710, the seignory was acquired by Pierre Tremblay who really began its development and granted concessions to settlers arriving at the beginning of the 18th century. In 1732, the parish was founded.

In 1810, the seignory was sold to Pierre de Sales Laterrière. In 1845, the municipality was originally established as L'Assomption-de-Notre-Dame-des-Éboulements, but abolished two years later. In 1855, it was reestablished as L'Assomption-de-la-Sainte-Vierge, and in 1859, the seignorial system was abolished by the municipal council.

In 1931, the Village Municipality of Saint-Joseph-de-la-Rive was formed when it separated from the Municipality of L'Assomption-de-la-Sainte-Vierge. In 1956, the municipality was renamed to Les Éboulements. In 2001, Les Éboulements and Saint-Joseph-de-la-Rive were merged and formed the new Municipality of Les Éboulements.

On October 13, 1997, a bus travelling down the steep road to Saint-Joseph-de-la-Rive failed to slow down and negotiate a turn, crashed through the barriers and plunged over 10 meters into a ravine. This accident killed 44 persons, making it the deadliest road accident in Canadian history.

Rolling downhill the Route du Port in September 2008 the Guinness World Record for Street luge has been established at 157.41 km/h (97 mph).

== Geography ==
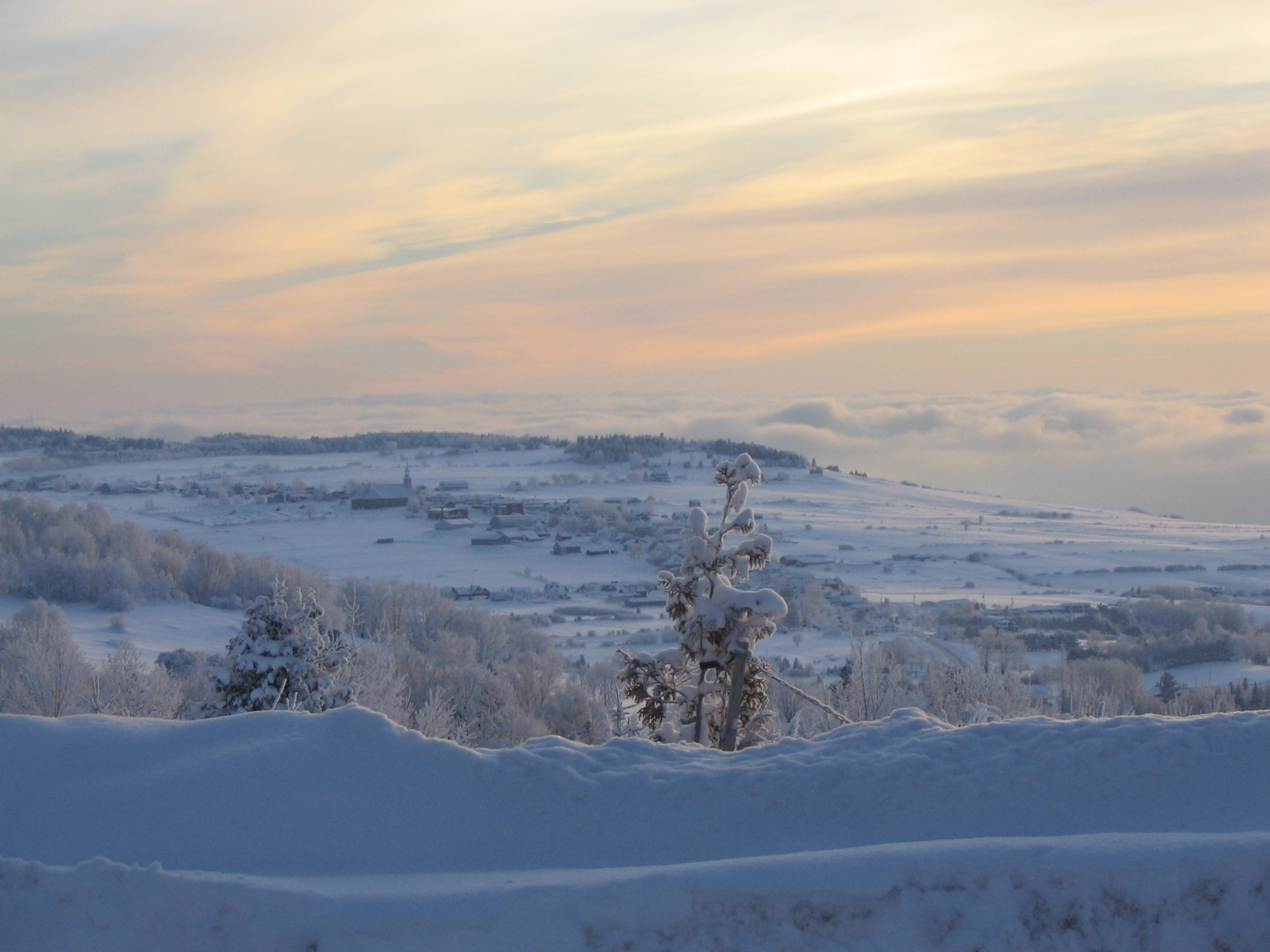
View of Les Éboulements in winter

Les Éboulements is located in the centre of the Charlevoix impact structure. Mount Éboulements (Mont des Éboulements), in the eastern part of the municipality, is considered the central rebound of the Earth's crust following moments after the meteor impact some 350 million years ago. This mountain, appearing on a map in 1837 by H. W. Bayfield as "Mt Eboulemens" [sic], has an altitude of 770 meters (2,530 ft).

Rivers within the municipality include the Boudreault and Seigneur Rivers, both small tributaries of the Saint Lawrence River.

== Demographics ==
Historical census populations – Les Éboulements

Year	Pop.	±%
1861	2,235	—
1871	2,115	−5.4%
1881	2,518	+19.1%
1891	2,608	+3.6%
1901	2,369	−9.2%
1911	2,138	−9.8%
1921	1,950	−8.8%
1931	1,522	−21.9%

Year	Pop.	±%
1941	1,612	+5.9%
1951	1,698	+5.3%
1956	1,710	+0.7%
1961	1,644	−3.9%
1966	1,412	−14.1%
1971	1,281	−9.3%
1976	1,190	−7.1%
1981	1,230	+3.4%

Year	Pop.	±%
1986	1,086	−11.7%
1991	1,013	−6.7%
1996	1,013	+0.0%
2001	1,027	+1.4%
2006	1,264	+23.1%
2011	1,328	+5.1%
2016	1,331	+0.2%
2021	1,465	+10.1%

Population counts are not adjusted for boundary changes and merger.
Source: Statistics Canada

Private dwellings occupied by usual residents (2021): 643 (total dwellings: 925)

Mother tongue (2021):

- French as first language: 97.3%
- English as first language: 0.3%
- English and French as first language: 0%
- Other as first language: 2.0%

== Arts and culture ==
The community appears in the National Film Board of Canada's films On the Sea (1960) by René Bonnière and Pierre Perrault and Terre de nos aïeux (1943), which was directed by Jane Marsh.

== See also ==
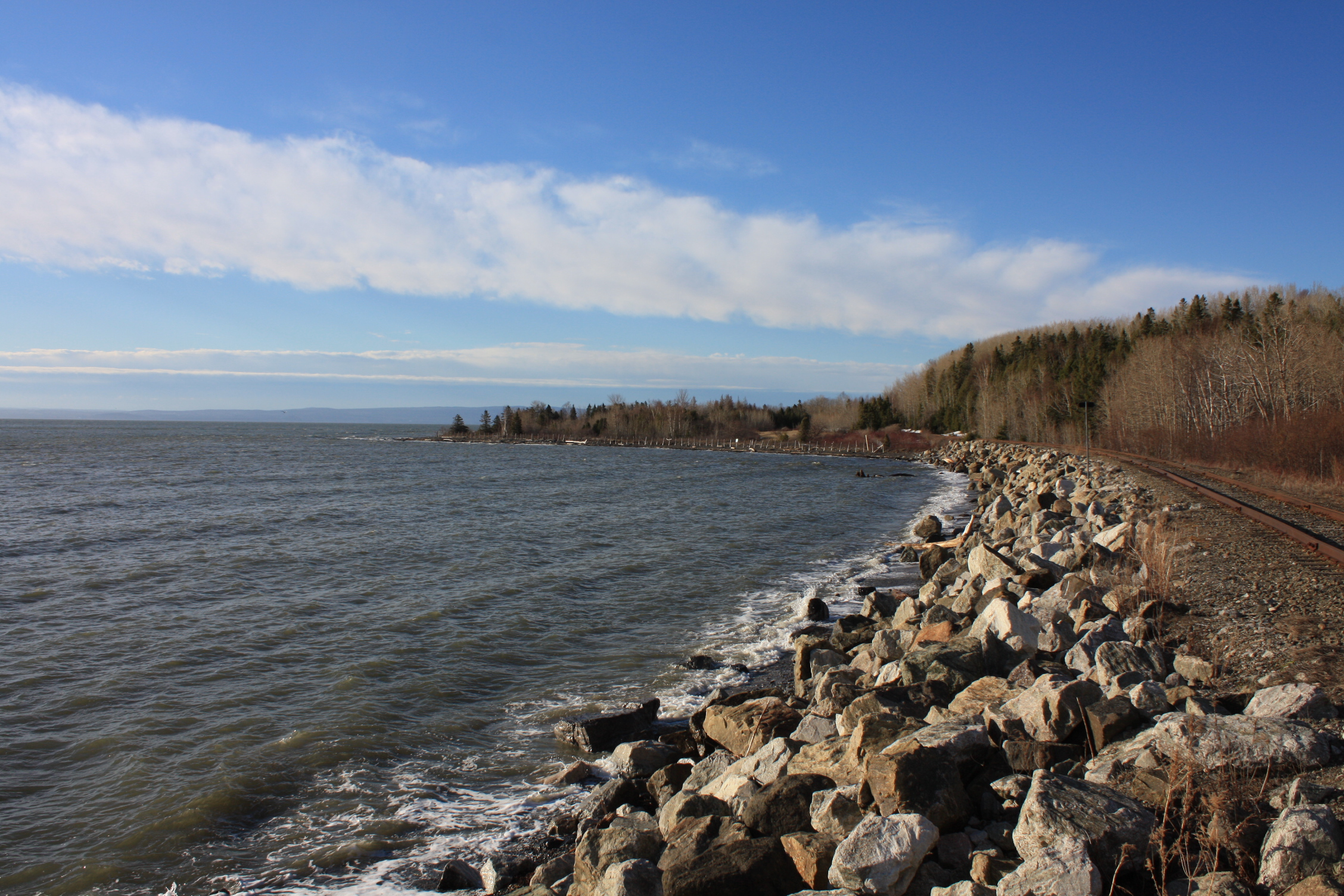
- Cap-aux-oies' beach, Les Éboulements, Québec, Canada. You can notice the railroad of the Charlevoix train.
  Charlevoix tourist train
