= Barley River =

- Location within Quebec

Location
- Country: Canada
- Province: Quebec
- Region: Capitale-Nationale
- Regional County Municipality: Charlevoix
- Municipalities: Lac-Pikauba

Physical characteristics
- Source: Wabano Lake
  - location: Lac-Pikauba
  - coordinates: 47°48′26″N 70°37′34″W
  - elevation: 884 m (2,900 ft)
- Mouth: Malbaie River
  - location: Lac-Pikauba
  - coordinates: 47°49′44″N 70°46′44″W
  - elevation: 630 m (2,070 ft)
- Length: 16.4 km (10.2 mi)

Basin features
- Tributaries
  - left: (Upward from the mouth): stream; outlet of Petit lac Barley, stream; outlet of Orignal, Éland and Gerfaut lakes; outlet of a small lake (via Barley Lake); outlet of Resche and Kestrel lakes; outlet (via Lesclache Lake) of a set of lakes; including February, Kakawi, Petit lac Caribou, Barnabé, and Petit lac Belle Truite; outlet of Petit lac Rétréci; (via Lesclache Lake); outlet of three lakes including Petit lac Nepton and lac Nepton.
  - right: (Upward from the mouth): discharge from Lake Joncas; discharge from Lake Zémilda; discharge from Évanturel Lake; two streams (via Barley Lake); discharge from Lakes Vireo and Little Lake Wabano.

The Barley River is a tributary of the eastern bank of the upper part of the Malbaie River, flowing in the unorganized territory of Lac-Pikauba, in the Charlevoix Regional County Municipality, in the administrative region of Capitale-Nationale, in the province of Quebec, in Canada. This watercourse successively crosses zec des Martres, then the Laurentides Wildlife Reserve.

The lower part of this valley is served by the route 381. The upper part is served by the forest road R0305 which passes on the south shore of Barley Lake for the needs of forestry. Forestry is the main economic activity in this valley; recreational tourism, second.

Because of the altitude, the surface of the Barley River is generally frozen from the end of November until the beginning of April; however, safe circulation on the ice is generally from the beginning of December until the end of March. The water level of the river varies with the seasons and the precipitation; the spring flood generally occurs in April.

== Geography ==
The Barley River originates from Lake Wabano (length: 0.8 kilometres (0.50 mi); altitude: 861 metres (2,825 ft)) landlocked between mountains, located in a forest area in the unorganized territory of Lac-Pikauba in the zec des Martres. The mouth of Lake Wabano is located to the southwest, at:

- 12.5 kilometres (7.8 mi) south-west of the confluence of the rivière des Martres and the Malbaie River;
- 39.5 kilometres (24.5 mi) west of La Malbaie town center;
- 41.7 kilometres (25.9 mi) north-west of Baie-Saint-Paul town center.

From its source, the course of the Barley River descends on 16.4 kilometres (10.2 mi) in a generally deep valley, with a drop of 231 metres (758 ft), according to the following segments:

- 2.3 kilometres (1.4 mi) west, in particular by crossing on 1.5 kilometres (0.93 mi) the Lesclache Lake (length: 2.1 kilometres (1.3 mi) in the north–south direction; altitude: 817 metres (2,680 ft)), to its mouth;
- 4.1 kilometres (2.5 mi) west, in particular by crossing Barley Lake (length: 3.5 kilometres (2.2 mi) including a peninsula stretching on 1.0 metre (3 ft 3 in) northward; altitude: 802 metres (2,631 ft)) in its full length, up to the dam at its mouth;
- 3.2 kilometres (2.0 mi) the southwest by forming a small loop towards the north to collect the discharge (coming from the north) of Évanturel Lake, crossing a zone of rapids, then crossing Lac du Coq (length : 1.9 kilometres (1.2 mi); altitude: 766 metres (2,513 ft)) over its full length, up to the dam at its mouth. Note: Lac du Coq receives from the southeast the discharge of three small lakes;
- 1.5 kilometres (0.93 mi) to the southwest by crossing a series of rapids and collecting a stream (coming from the north), then to the west by crossing two series of rapids, to the discharge (from the south) of Petit lac Barley;
- 2.3 kilometres (1.4 mi) north-west, up to the outlet (coming from the north-east) of Lac Joncas;
- 3.0 kilometres (1.9 mi) north-west across a series of rapids, to its mouth.

The Barley River flows onto the west bank of the Malbaie River, in the unorganized territory of Lac-Pikauba, in the Laurentides Wildlife Reserve. This mouth is located at:

- 1.7 kilometres (1.1 mi) east of a mountain peak (altitude: 984 metres (3,228 ft));
- 15.2 kilometres (9.4 mi) downstream of the mouth of the Petite rivière Malbaie;
- 47.6 kilometres (29.6 mi) north-west of downtown Baie-Saint-Paul;
- 51.0 kilometres (31.7 mi) west of downtown La Malbaie.

From the mouth of the Barley River, the current descends on 108 kilometres (67 mi) with a drop of 656 metres (2,152 ft) following the course of the Malbaie river which flows into La Malbaie in the St. Lawrence River.

== Toponymy ==
During the history the spelling of this toponym knew the variants: Berly, Berley and in Berley. In 1927, the current Barley spelling was finally fixed. This toponym evokes the life work of Pierre Berly, Amerindian of Abenaki origin who camped in the region. He operated at the outlet of the lake a trout pit known as "Trou à Berly". The toponym "Lac Barley" appears under the spelling "Lac Berley", named after an old Abenaki, Pierre Berley, in the work of Thomas Fortin, The last of the coureurs de bois, by Damase Potvin, 1945, page 211. This toponymic denomination was approved on 1963-07-03 by the Commission of geography of Quebec.

The toponym "Rivière Barley" was formalized on December 5, 1968, at the Place Names Bank of the Commission de toponymie du Québec.

== Appendices ==
=== Related articles ===
- Charlevoix Regional County Municipality
- Lac-Pikauba, an unorganized territory
- Zec des Martres, a controlled harvesting zone
- Laurentides Wildlife Reserve
- Barley Lake
- Lesclache Lake
- Évanturel Lake
- Malbaie River
- St. Lawrence River
- List of rivers of Quebec
