= Évanturel =

Evanturel is a township in Ontario, Canada.

Évanturel may refer to:

- Alfred Évanturel (1846-1908), Canadian politician
- Eudore Évanturel (1852–1919), Canadian poet
- François Évanturel (1821-1891), Canadian lawyer and politician
- Gustave Évanturel (1879-1934), Canadian notary and politician
- Évanturel Lake, a body of water in Lac-Pikauba, Quebec, Canada
