= Barley Lake =

Lake in Canada

- Location in Quebec
- Location: Lac-Pikauba, Charlevoix Regional County Municipality (MRC), Capitale-Nationale, Quebec, Canada
- Coordinates: 47.80972°N 70.66861°W
- Lake type: Natural
- Primary inflows: (Clockwise from the mouth): Two unidentified streams, Barley River, Resche Lake outlet, unidentified stream.
- Primary outflows: Barley River
- Basin countries: Canada
- Max. length: 3.5 km (2.2 mi)
- Max. width: 1.3 km (0.81 mi)
- Surface elevation: 802 m (2,631 ft)
- Islands: 4

The Barley Lake (French: Lac Barley) is a body of fresh water located in the unorganized territory of Lac-Pikauba, in the regional county municipality of Charlevoix Regional County Municipality, in the administrative region of Capitale-Nationale, in the province of Quebec, in Canada. This body of water is located in zec des Martres, outside (on the east side) of Laurentides Wildlife Reserve.

Lake Barley is the main body of water on the Barley River. This mountain lake is entirely located in an area where forestry has always been the predominant economic activity. In the 19th century, recreational and tourism activities took off. Due to the altitude, this lake is normally frozen from late October to early May; however, the safe ice circulation period is usually from early December to April.

A forest road serves the hydrographic slope of Grand lac des Enfers.

== Geography ==
Located in a forest area in the unorganized territory of Lac-Pikauba in the zec des Martres, Lake Barley (length: 3.5 kilometres (2.2 mi); altitude: 802 metres (2,631 ft)) is crossed to the southwest by the current of the Barley River. The mouth of Barley Lake is located at the bottom of a bay on the west shore of the lake, at:

- 3.9 kilometres (2.4 mi) south-west of a bay in lac des Martres;
- 43.8 kilometres (27.2 mi) west of La Malbaie town center;
- 41.7 kilometres (25.9 mi) north-west of Baie-Saint-Paul town center.

From the mouth of Barley Lake, the current descends the Barley River on 10.0 kilometres (6.2 mi) generally west, then follows the course of the Malbaie River on 108 kilometres (67 mi) with a drop of 656 metres (2,152 ft) which pours into La Malbaie in the St. Lawrence River.

== Toponymy ==
Formerly the spelling of this toponym used the following variants: Berly or Berley. The current form of the toponym Barley dates from 1927. Approved in 1963 by the Commission de géographie du Québec, this toponymic designation evokes the memory of Pierre Berly, Amerindian of Abenaki origin who camped in the region; he operated, at the outlet of the lake, a trout pit known as Trou à Berly. The name appeared in the form "Lac Berley", named after an old Abenaki, Pierre Berley, as explained by Thomas Fortin, in his work "The last of the coureurs de bois", by Damase Potvin, 1945, page 211. Lac Barley Croche and Lac Barley Rétréci are two variants of the official name.

The toponym "Grand lac des Enfers" was formalized on February 25, 1976 at the Bank of Place Names of the Commission de toponymie du Québec.

== Related articles ==
- Charlevoix Regional County Municipality
- Lac-Pikauba, an unorganized territory
- Zec des Martres
- Malbaie River
