= Lesclache Lake =

Lake in Canada

- Location in Quebec
- Location: Lac-Pikauba, Charlevoix Regional County Municipality (MRC), Capitale-Nationale, Quebec, Canada
- Coordinates: 47.80972°N 70.66861°W
- Lake type: Natural
- Primary inflows: (Clockwise from the mouth): Barley River, discharge from an unidentified lake, unidentified stream.
- Primary outflows: Barley River
- Basin countries: Canada
- Max. length: 2.1 km (1.3 mi)
- Max. width: 0.5 km (0.31 mi)
- Surface elevation: 817 m (2,680 ft)

Lesclache Lake (French: Lac Lesclache) is a freshwater body located in the unorganized territory of Lac-Pikauba, in the Charlevoix Regional County Municipality, in the administrative region of Capitale-Nationale, in the province of Quebec, in Canada. This body of water is located in zec des Martres, outside Laurentides Wildlife Reserve.

Lesclache Lake is one of the main head water bodies of the Barley River. This mountain lake is entirely located in an area where forestry has always been the predominant economic activity. In the middle of XIXth, recreational tourism activities took off. Due to the altitude, this lake is normally frozen from late October to early May; however, the safe ice circulation period is usually from early December to April.

A forest road serves the hydrographic slope of Grand lac des Enfers.

== Geography ==
Located in a forest area in the unorganized territory of Lac-Pikauba in the zec des Martres, Lesclache Lake (length: 2.1 kilometres (1.3 mi); altitude: 817 metres (2,680 ft)) is crossed to the southwest by the current of the Barley River. The mouth of Lesclache Lake is located at the bottom of a bay on the southwest shore of the lake, at:

- 1.8 kilometres (1.1 mi) south of a bay in lac des Martres;
- 40.8 kilometres (25.4 mi) west of La Malbaie town center;
- 41.6 kilometres (25.8 mi) north-west of Baie-Saint-Paul town center.

From the mouth of Lesclache Lake, the current descends the Barley River on 14.1 kilometres (8.8 mi) generally west, then follows the course of the Malbaie River on 108 kilometres (67 mi) with a drop of 656 metres (2,152 ft) which flows into La Malbaie in the St. Lawrence River.

== Toponymy ==
This toponymic designation appears on the draft of the Lac des Martres map, 1961-09-25, item 69. This toponym evokes the memory of Father Jacques de Lesclaches, born in France in 1670, who was ordained a priest in Quebec, October 7, 1714. He took care of the parish of Baie-Saint-Paul between 1722 and 1727. He died in Quebec, October 31, 1746. This name was approved on 1963-07-03 by the Commission de géographie du Quebec. "Little Barley Lake" is a variant of this name.

The toponym "Lac Lesclache" was formalized on December 5, 1968 at the Place Names Bank of the Commission de toponymie du Québec.

== Related articles ==
- Charlevoix Regional County Municipality
- Lac-Pikauba, an unorganized territory
- Zec des Martres
- Malbaie River
