= Malbaie Pond =

Lake in Charlevoix, Quebec, Canada

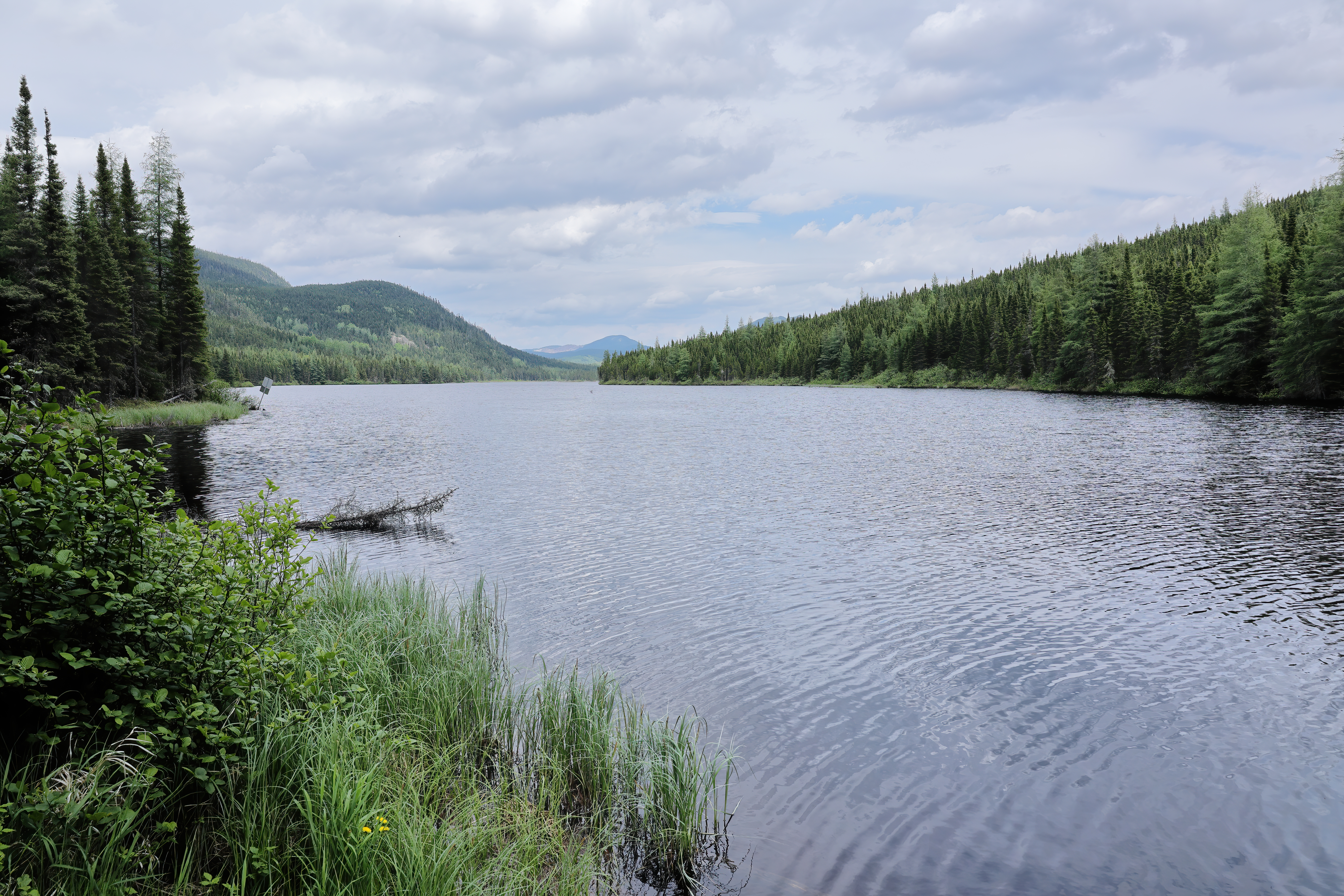

- Location in Quebec
- Location: Lac-Pikauba, Charlevoix Regional County Municipality (MRC), Capitale-Nationale, Quebec, Canada
- Coordinates: 47.73028°N 70.74028°W
- Lake type: Natural
- Primary inflows: (Clockwise from the mouth) Discharge from an unidentified lake, two streams, Petite rivière Malbaie, discharge from Lac de la Galette and lac Rameau, unidentified stream.
- Primary outflows: Petite rivière Malbaie
- Basin countries: Canada
- Max. length: 2.3 km (1.4 mi)
- Max. width: 1.0 km (0.62 mi)
- Surface elevation: 719 m (2,359 ft)
- Islands: 0

L Étang Malbaie (English: Malbaie Pond) is a freshwater body crossed by the Petite rivière Malbaie, in the unorganized territory of Lac-Pikauba, in the regional county municipality (MRC) of Charlevoix Regional County Municipality, in the administrative region of Capitale-Nationale, in the province of Quebec, in Canada. This lake which is located in a forest and mountainous area, in the eastern part of Grands-Jardins National Park.

The eastern part of Étang Malbaie is accessible by the route 381 which goes up to the north. A secondary forest road runs along the north shore of this body of water.

This mountain lake is entirely located in an area where forestry has always been the predominant economic activity; recreational tourism, second. In the middle of 19th century, recreational tourism activities took off.

Due to the altitude, this lake is normally frozen from the beginning of December to the end of April; however, the safe period for traffic on the ice is usually from mid-December to mid-April.

== Geography ==
The Étang Malbaie has a length of 2.3 kilometres (1.4 mi), a width of 1.0 kilometre (0.62 mi) and an altitude of 719 metres (2,359 ft). It is located between the mountains including Mont René-Richard (altitude: 995 metres (3,264 ft)) located at 1.2 kilometres (0.75 mi) to the north, as well as another mountain (altitude of summit: 830 metres (2,720 ft)) located at 0.5 kilometres (0.31 mi) to the south. Étang Malbaie is mainly fed by the outlet (coming from the north) of the Petite rivière Malbaie, the outlet of Lac de la Galette and Lac Rameau, as well as an unidentified stream.

The main hydrographic slopes adjacent to the Malbaie Pond are:

- to the east: Lac de la Galette;
- to the south: Pointu Lake, Roche Lake;
- to the west: Petite rivière Malbaie, Malbaie River;
- north: Petite rivière Malbaie.

The mouth of the Malbaie Pond is located to the southwest. From the dam at the mouth, the current descends on 3.1 kilometres (1.9 mi) the Petite rivière Malbaie generally towards the southwest with a drop of 59 metres (194 ft), up to the East bank of the Malbaie river. From there, the current descends on 123.2 kilometres (76.6 mi) following the course of the Malbaie river which flows to La Malbaie in the Saint Lawrence River.

== Toponymy ==
The toponymic designation "Malbaie Pond" is contextual, suggesting the presence of a pond. This designation is linked to the other local toponyms using the term "Malbaie": Petit lac Malbaie, Petite rivière Malbaie and Malbaie River. The dam at the mouth of this pond was erected in 1955. This toponym appears on a document from the Ministry of Natural Resources in 1973.

The toponym “Étang Malbaie” was formalized on June 6, 1973, at the Place Names Bank of the Commission de toponymie du Québec.

== See also ==
- Charlevoix Regional County Municipality
- Lac-Pikauba, an unorganized territory
- Grands-Jardins National Park
- Petite rivière Malbaie
- Malbaie River
