= Évanturel Lake =

Lake in Quebec, Canada

- Lac de l'Équerre
- Location in Quebec
- Location: Lac-Pikauba, Charlevoix Regional County Municipality (MRC), Capitale-Nationale, Quebec, Canada
- Coordinates: 47.81916°N 70.69334°W
- Lake type: Natural
- Primary inflows: (Clockwise from the mouth): Six mountain streams, Petit Évanturel outlet.
- Primary outflows: Barley River
- Basin countries: Canada
- Max. length: 2.3 km (1.4 mi)
- Max. width: 0.66 km (0.41 mi)
- Surface elevation: 829 m (2,720 ft)

Évanturel Lake (French: Lac Évanturel) is a freshwater body located in the unorganized territory of Lac-Pikauba, in the Charlevoix Regional County Municipality, in the administrative region of Capitale-Nationale, in the province of Quebec, in Canada. This body of water is located in the zec des Martres, outside the Laurentides Wildlife Reserve.

Lake Évanturel is one of the main bodies of water at the head of the Barley River. This mountain lake is entirely located in an area where forestry has always been the predominant economic activity. In the middle of XIXth, recreational tourism activities took off. Due to the altitude, this lake is normally frozen from late October to early May; however, the safe ice circulation period is usually from early December to April.

A forest road serves the western part of the hydro-graphic slope of Lake Évanturel and another road the eastern part.

== Geography ==
Located in a forest area in the unorganized territory of Lac-Pikauba in the zec des Martres, Lake Évanturel (length: 2.3 kilometres (1.4 mi); altitude: 829 metres (2,720 ft)) is located on the northern slope of the Barley River valley. The mouth of Lake Évanturel is located at the bottom of a bay on the south shore of the lake, at:

- 0.8 kilometres (0.50 mi) north of the forest road R0305;
- 3.7 kilometres (2.3 mi) south-west of a bay in lac des Martres;
- 44.2 kilometres (27.5 mi) west of La Malbaie town center;
- 43.7 kilometres (27.2 mi) north-west of Baie-Saint-Paul town center.

From the mouth of Lake Évanturel, the current descends on 0.76 kilometres (0.47 mi) towards the south the outlet of Lake Évanturel, then follows the course of the Barley River on 10.5 kilometres (6.5 mi) generally towards the west, then follows the course of the Malbaie river on 108 kilometres (67 mi) with a drop of 656 metres (2,152 ft) which flows into La Malbaie in the Saint Lawrence River.

== Toponymy ==
This name appears on the 1954 map of the Parc des Laurentides and on Regional Map No 3, sheet 3 East, 3 miles per inch, 1957. This name also appeared on the draft map of Lac des Martres, 1961-09-25, item 62.

The term "Évanturel" is a family name of French origin. It is not unreasonable to believe that this toponym evokes the work of life of the Quebec poet Eudore Évanturel (Quebec, September 22, 1852 - Boston, May 16, 1919). Encouraged by the novelist Joseph Marmette, his friend, he published in 1878 a volume of First Poems. This collection, inspired by Musset but with Verlainian accents, scandalized the conservative literary milieu of Quebec at the time. The ruthless and unfair criticisms of Jules-Paul Tardivel in particular dissuaded him from going further in the career. The author subsequently published only a few isolated poems. His work is still little known, but it is nonetheless among the most sensitive, original and inspired poets of Quebec before Nelligan. He is buried in the Notre-Dame-de-Belmont cemetery in Sainte-Foy. This toponymic designation was approved on 1963-07-03 by the Commission de géographie du Québec. Formerly, this body of water was designated "Lac de l'Équerre".

The toponym "Lac Évanturel" was formalized on December 5, 1968 at the Place Names Bank of the Commission de toponymie du Québec.

== Related articles ==
- Charlevoix Regional County Municipality
- Lac-Pikauba, an unorganized territory
- Zec des Martres
- Malbaie River
