= Petit lac Malbaie =

Lake in Charlevoix, Quebec, Canada

- Location in Quebec
- Location: Lac-Pikauba, Charlevoix Regional County Municipality (MRC), Capitale-Nationale, Quebec, Canada
- Coordinates: 47.77278°N 70.65916°W
- Lake type: Natural
- Primary inflows: (Clockwise from the mouth) Lac Claire and Bec-Croisé outlet, the outlet of First and Second Lac Landry.
- Primary outflows: Petite rivière Malbaie
- Basin countries: Canada
- Max. length: 2.6 km (1.6 mi)
- Max. width: 0.5 km (0.31 mi)
- Surface elevation: 861 m (2,825 ft)
- Islands: 1

The Petit lac Malbaie is a freshwater body of the unorganized territory of Lac-Pikauba, in the Charlevoix Regional County Municipality, in the administrative region of Capitale-Nationale, in the province of Quebec, in Canada. This lake, which is located in a forest and mountainous area, is part of the zec des Martres, that is to the northeast of Grands-Jardins National Park.

The southern part of Petit lac Malbaie is accessible by a forest road from the south. This mountain lake is entirely located in an area where forestry has always been the predominant economic activity; recreational tourism, second. In the middle of 19th century, recreational tourism activities took off.

Due to the altitude, this lake is normally frozen from mid-November to the end of April; however, the safe ice traffic period is usually from early December to mid-April.

== Geography ==
Petit lac Malbaie (altitude: 861 m) has a length of 2.6 kilometres (1.6 mi), a width of 0.5 kilometres (0.31 mi) and an altitude of 861 metres (2,825 ft). It is located between the mountains including Mont Barbeau (altitude: 1,099 metres (3,606 ft)) located 0.9 kilometres (0.56 mi) to the southeast, as well as another mountain (summit altitude: 930 metres (3,050 ft)) located 0.25 kilometres (0.16 mi) to the west. Petit lac Malbaie is mainly fed by the outlet (coming from the east) of the First and Second Lac Landry, as well as the outlet (coming from the northwest) from Lac Claire and Lac du Bec-Croisé.

The main hydrographic slopes neighboring Petit Lac Malbaie are:

- to the east: Lac des Cavernes, Second Lac Laury;
- to the south: Lac de la Baie;
- to the west: Lac Gilbert, Lac Équerre, Petite rivière Malbaie, Malbaie River;
- north: Lac Barley, Lac Lesclache.

The mouth of Petit lac Malbaie is located to the southwest. From the dam at the mouth of Petit lac Malbaie, the current descends on 13.6 kilometres (8.5 mi) the Petite rivière Malbaie generally towards the southwest with a drop of 201 metres (659 ft), to the east bank of the Malbaie river. From there, the current descends on 123.2 kilometres (76.6 mi) following the course of the Malbaie river which flows to La Malbaie in the St. Lawrence River.

== Toponymy ==
This toponymic designation appears on the draft of the Lac des Martres map, 1961-09-25, item 67. This denomination was approved on 1963-07-03 by the Commission de géographie du Québec.

The toponym "Petit lac Malbaie" was formalized on December 5, 1968, at the Place Names Bank of the Commission de toponymie du Québec.

== See also ==
- Charlevoix Regional County Municipality
- Lac-Pikauba, an unorganized territory
- Zec des Martres, a controlled exploitation zone
- Petite rivière Malbaie
- Malbaie River
