= Petite rivière Malbaie =

River in Charlevoix Regional County Municipality, Quebec, Canada

Petite rivière Malbaie Old name: "Petite rivière"
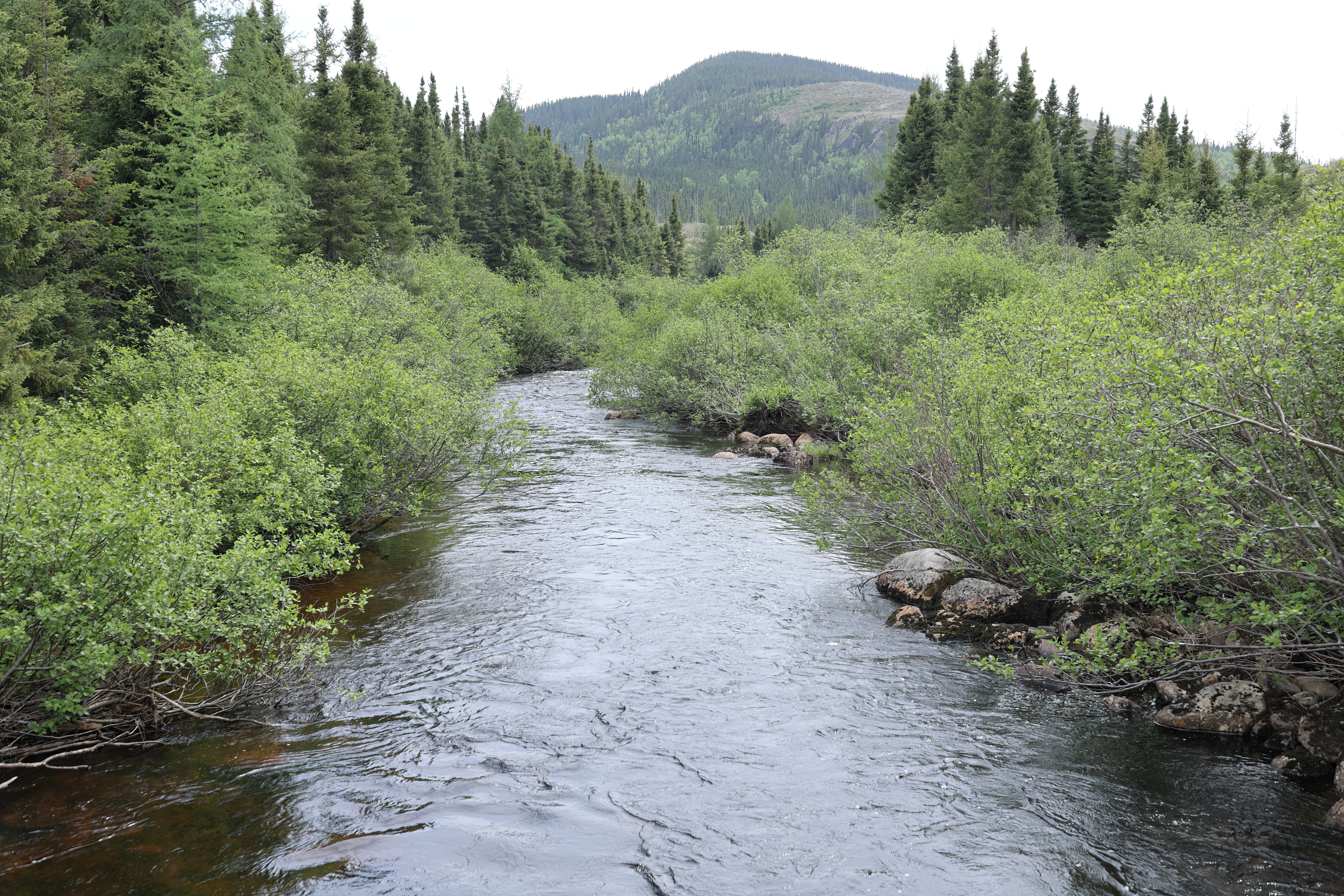

- Location within Quebec

Location
- Country: Canada
- Province: Quebec
- Region: Capitale-Nationale
- Regional County Municipality: Charlevoix Regional County Municipality
- Municipality: Lac-Pikauba

Physical characteristics
- Source: Petit lac Malbaie
  - location: Lac-Pikauba
  - coordinates: 47°46′01″N 70°40′20″W
  - elevation: 861 m
- Mouth: Malbaie River
  - location: Lac-Pikauba
  - coordinates: 47°43′08″N 70°47′40″W
  - elevation: 660 m
- Length: 13.6 km (8.5 mi)

Basin features
- Tributaries
  - left: (Upstream from the mouth) Lake Carré outlet, unidentified stream, Pointu lake outlet, unidentified stream, Lac de la Galette and Lac Rameau outlet, Lac de Foin and Second lac Josée-Marie, three streams, outlet of two lakes.
  - right: (Upstream from the mouth) Discharge from Versant Lake, discharge from Gérard Lake, discharge from a small lake, unidentified stream, discharge from Vernier Lake, discharge from Amik Lake, discharge from Rocheux Lake, discharge from Cabane Lake (via the lake Équerre), discharge from an unidentified lake (via the lake Équerre), discharge from the Shrink Lake.

The Petite rivière Malbaie (English: Little Malbaie River) is a tributary of the east bank of the Malbaie River, flowing in the unorganized territory of Lac-Pikauba, in the Charlevoix Regional County Municipality, in the administrative region of Capitale-Nationale, in the province of Quebec, in Canada. This watercourse crosses zec des Martres and Grands-Jardins National Park.

The intermediate part of this small valley is accessible via the forest road route 381. Forestry is the main economic activity in this valley; recreational tourism, second.

The surface of the Petite Rivière Malbaie is generally frozen from the end of November to the beginning of March; however, safe circulation on the ice is generally done from the beginning of December to the beginning of April. The water level of the river varies with the seasons and the precipitation; the spring flood generally occurs in April.

== Geography ==
The Petite rivière Malbaie rises from Petit lac Malbaie (length: 2.6 kilometres (1.6 mi); altitude: 861 metres (2,825 ft)), located in a forest area in the zec des Martres. This lake is landlocked between the mountains, particularly the cliffs of the eastern shore, in Lac-Pikauba. This lake is mainly fed by the discharge of a set of small lakes (coming from the west) and two small streams flowing into the southern part of the lake. The mouth of this small lake is located to the southwest, at:

- 1.35 kilometres (0.84 mi) north-west of the summit of Mont du Barbeau (altitude: 1,099 metres (3,606 ft));
- 3.4 kilometres (2.1 mi) northeast of route 381;
- 9.3 kilometres (5.8 mi) east of the course of the Malbaie River;
- 41.1 kilometres (25.5 mi) west of La Malbaie town center;
- 10.6 kilometres (6.6 mi) north-east of the mouth of the Petite Rivière Malbaie.

From the mouth of Petit lac Malbaie, the course of the Petite rivière Malbaie descends on 13.6 kilometres (8.5 mi), with a drop of 201 metres (659 ft), according to the following segments:

- 0.8 kilometres (0.50 mi) towards the west by collecting the discharge (coming from the north) of a small lake, then curving towards the northeast, until the discharge (coming from the north) of Lac Rétréci;
- 1.5 kilometres (0.93 mi) westwards crossing Lac de la Mine (length: 0.8 kilometres (0.50 mi); altitude: 792 metres (2,598 ft)), then on 0.1 kilometres (0.062 mi) an unidentified lake (length: 0.9 kilometres (0.56 mi); altitude: 788 metres (2,585 ft)), to the dam at its mouth (south of lake);
- 3.4 kilometres (2.1 mi) first towards the southwest curving towards the south by collecting the discharge (coming from the northwest) of Lac Rocheux and the discharge (coming from the northwest) of Lac Amik, as well as by cutting route 381 at the end of the segment, to the outlet (coming from the north) of Lac Vernier;
- 2.5 kilometres (1.6 mi) southerly in a straight line along route 381 on the west side and passing on the east side of Mont René-Richard (altitude: 995 metres (3,264 ft)), to the northeast shore of Malbaie Pond;
- 2.3 kilometres (1.4 mi) towards the south-east, crossing the Malbaie Pond (altitude: 719 metres (2,359 ft)) over its full length to the dam at its mouth. Note: This pond receives the outlet (coming from the east) from Lac de la Galette and from Lac Rameau, as well as the outlet (coming from the southeast) from Lac Rameau;
- 2.3 kilometres (1.4 mi) towards the south-east, crossing three series of rapids in a deep valley and collecting the discharge (coming from the south-east) from Lac Pointu, to a stream (coming from the South);
- 0.8 kilometres (0.50 mi) north-west, to its mouth.

The Petite rivière Malbaie flows on the east bank of the Malbaie River, in Lac-Pikauba. This mouth is located at:

- 5.2 kilometres (3.2 mi) north-west of lac Sainte-Anne du Nord;
- 37.5 kilometres (23.3 mi) north-west of Baie-Saint-Paul town center;
- 9.0 kilometres (5.6 mi) west of the village center of Le Pied-des-Monts.

== Toponymy ==
In his Journal of the year 1731 [transcription of Serge Goudreau], Louis Aubert de Lachesnaye describes this watercourse in the form of “Petite riviere de la Malbaye”: “When you are at the Pointe au Pique, you do the south south west half quarter place. When you have passed the avance from the point to the Pique, you usually wet the building. We go south-west and south-west quarter west to the little river of Malbaye ["little river of the malbaye" in the manuscript] which does not carry canoe distance from a place "[September 15, 1731].

This topographic designation appears on the map of the Laurentides Park (today sector of the Grands-Jardins National Park) and on the regional map number 3-East, 1943, section 23 NW. Rivière Petite is a variant of this name.

The toponym "Petite rivière Malbaie" was formalized on December 5, 1968 at the Place Names Bank of the Commission de toponymie du Québec.

== Appendices ==
=== Related articles ===
- Charlevoix Regional County Municipality
- Lac-Pikauba, an unorganized territory
- Zec des Martres
- Grands-Jardins National Park
- Petit lac Malbaie
- Malbaie Pond (French: Étang Malbaie)
- Malbaie River
- St. Lawrence River
- List of rivers of Quebec
