= Eudore Évanturel =

Canadian poet

- Born: 22 September 1852; Quebec City, Canada East
- Died: 16 May 1919 (aged 66); Boston, Massachusetts, U.S.
- Occupation: Poet

Eudore Évanturel (Quebec City, 22 September 1852 – Boston, 16 May 1919) was a Canadian poet from Quebec.

== Biography ==
Interested very early in poetry, he frequented clubs of young writers. In October 1875, his play "Crâne et cervelle" was read before an audience in Quebec. The work, which tells the story of a medical student who steals corpses to dissect them and who falls on the remains of his own fiancée, is scandalous. The reaction will be just as lively in the following days with some of his poems published in the newspaper L'Évènement.

Shaken but encouraged by the novelist Joseph Marmette, his friend, Évanturel published in 1878 a volume of Premier poésies. This collection, inspired by Musset but with accents verlainiens, still scandalizes the conservative literary milieu of Quebec at the time. The ruthless and unfair criticism of Jules-Paul Tardivel in particular closes doors for him and drives his friends away. He lost his job and even the support of Joseph Marmette. Thus dissuaded from going further in his career, unemployed, Évanturel went into exile in United States in Lowell where he founded a French-language newspaper. He married in Quebec in 1884 Esther Casgrain and returned to settle in Quebec in 1887 where he died in 1919.

The author only publishes a few isolated poems thereafter. He was however one of the first to deal with themes different from those in force at the time: wide open spaces, patriotic impulses, glorification of God, etc. Évanturel tackles rather subjects which strike the ambient conservatism. He takes an observer position on art, love, death, the middle classes, social disparities, sadness, scenes of private life, etc. In this sense, he appears to be a pioneer who sought to break conventions. His work is still unknown, but he is nonetheless one of the most sensitive, original and inspired poets of Quebec before Nelligan.

He is buried in Cimetière Notre-Dame-de-Belmont, in Sainte-Foy.

== Sources ==
- Notre premier poète maudit (English: Our first cursed poet), article by Gilles Laporte in Légendes d'un peuple: tome 2 (English: Legends of a people), Les disques Gavroche, 2012, p. 76–81, ISBN 9782981359018.
