= Zec des Martres =

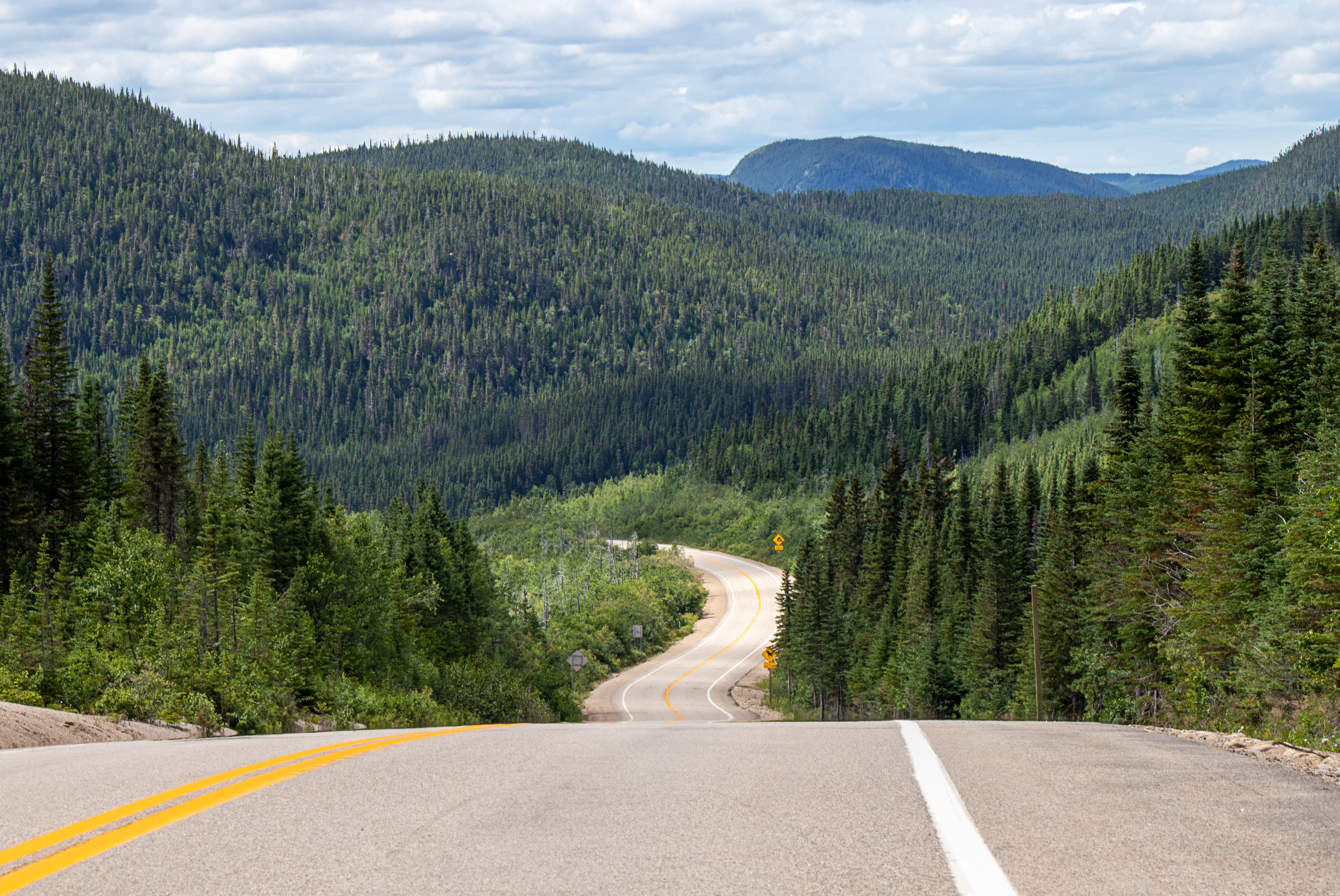

- Location within Quebec
- Location: Canada, Quebec, Charlevoix; Charlevoix-Est
- Nearest city: Lac-Pikauba
- Coordinates: 47°48′00″N 70°37′00″W
- Area: 424 square kilometres (164 sq mi)
- Established: 1978
- Governing body: Association de plein air des Martres inc

The Zec des Martres is a "zone d'exploitation contrôlée" (controlled harvesting zone), in the unorganized territory of Lac-Pikauba, in Charlevoix Regional County Municipality, in the administrative region of Capitale-Nationale, Quebec, Canada.

The Zec is located in public lands. It is managed by the Association de plein air des Martres, which is a non-profit organization. The Zec has a mission to develop the land and make it available to the general public for outdoor activities including: hiking, quad/snowmobile, camping, hunting, fishing and watching scenery, flora and fauna.

== Geography ==
Founded in 1978, the Zec des Martres covers 424 square kilometers and includes 219 lakes. The Zec is entirely in forested area.

The Zec is bordered by the Laurentides Wildlife Reserve to the west; the Grands-Jardins National Park (Parc national des Grands-Jardins), to the south-west; the Municipality of Saint-Urbain, to the southeast of Zec du Lac-au-Sable, to the east; and the Hautes-Gorges-de-la-Rivière-Malbaie National Park to the north.

Route 381 linking Baie Saint-Paul to Saguenay runs more or less along the western boundary of the Zec. A segment of the road in the Hautes-Gorges crosses the eastern part of the Zec, in the north-south direction.

The Zec offers a hosting service at "Chalet de la Cheminée" (Villa of the Fireplace) and 17 campgrounds, all accessible by car. Many lakes in the Zec are equipped with a ramp to the water.

== Toponymy ==
The name "Zec des Martres" takes its name from Lac des Martres (Lake of Martens) which is the largest lake of the Zec . A marten is a carnivorous mammal with a long, supple body, a bushy tail and brown fur. In 1886, Lac des Martres was described by the land surveyor F. Vincent, who noted that it was surrounded by fir and spruce, and that there was trout in the lake.

The name "Zec des Martres" was formalized on August 5, 1982.

== Features ==
The main rivers of the Zec include:

- du Gouffre,
- Malbaie
- Malbaie-Est
- Chouinard
- Porc-Épic
- des Érables
- Rivière Chemin des canots
- Ruisseau du Pont

Major lakes of the Zec are:

- des Américains
- de la Baie
- Barley
- Beaulieu,
- Belle Truite
- du Bouchon
- Boulianne
- de la Cabane
- Caribou
- des Cavernes
- du Coeur
- en Coeur
- du Coq
- Côte à Côte
- Croche
- à l'Écluse
- des Employés
- des Érables
- Équerre
- Évanturel
- Favre
- Froid
- Premier lac du Foulon
- Deuxième lac du Foulon
- Deuxième lac Paul
- Gabriel
- de la Galette
- du Gros Castor
- de la Grosse Femelle
- de la Hache
- Jérôme
- Lesclache
- Long
- Lunettes
- à la Main
- des Martres
- de la Mésange
- Nazaire
- Oscar
- du Pied des Monts
- Petit lac Barley
- Petit lac de la Baie
- Petit lac Barley
- Petit lac Long
- Petit lac Malfait
- Petit lac des Martres
- Petit lac de la Savane
- Petit lac Malbaie
- Pouliot
- Prime
- Resche
- Rétréci
- Rameau
- Robbé
- Rosa
- Tité
- du Tonnerre

== See also ==
- Lac-Pikauba, unorganized territory
- Charlevoix Regional County Municipality, (RCM)
- Capitale-Nationale, administrative region
- Petit lac Malbaie, a waterbody
- Petite rivière Malbaie, a river
- Malbaie River, a river
- Rivière du Gouffre, a river
- Grands-Jardins National Park (Parc national des Grands-Jardins)
- Laurentides Wildlife Reserve
- Hautes-Gorges-de-la-Rivière-Malbaie National Park (Parc national des Hautes-Gorges-de-la-Rivière-Malbaie)
- Zone d'exploitation contrôlée (Controlled harvesting zone) (ZEC)
