= Ruisseau du Pied du Mont =

Location
- Country: Canada
- Province: Quebec
- Region: Capitale-Nationale
- Regional County Municipality: Charlevoix Regional County Municipality
- City: Baie-Saint-Paul

Physical characteristics
- Source: Little unidentified lake
  - location: Baie-Saint-Paul
  - coordinates: 47.43487°N 70.64844°W
  - elevation: 536 m (1,759 ft)
- Mouth: Rivière des Mares (Gouffre River tributary)
  - location: Baie-Saint-Paul
  - coordinates: 47.485°N 70.62333°W
  - elevation: 300 m (980 ft)
- Length: 8.4 km (5.2 mi)

Basin features
- Tributaries
  - left: (from the mouth) Stream, rivière à Ange, outlet of Lac du Pied du Mont, two streams.
  - right: (from the mouth) Four streams.

The ruisseau du Pied du Mont (English: Pied du Mont stream) is a tributary of the southern bank of the upper part of the rivière des Mares (Gouffre River tributary), flowing entirely in the town of Baie-Saint-Paul, in the Charlevoix Regional County Municipality, in the administrative region of Capitale-Nationale, in the province of Quebec, in Canada.

This valley is mainly served by the Chemin du Séminaire which cuts the intermediate part of this stream, as well as by another secondary forest road for the upper part. Forestry is the main economic activity in this valley; recreational tourism, second.

The Pied du Mont stream surface is generally frozen from the beginning of December until the beginning of April; however, safe circulation on the ice is generally done from mid-December to the end of March. The water level of the river varies with the seasons and the precipitation; the spring flood generally occurs in April.

== Geography ==
The Pied du Mont stream rises at the mouth of an unidentified small lake (length: 0.127 kilometres (0.079 mi); altitude: 536 metres (1,759 ft)). This lake is enclosed between the mountains, a summit of which reaches 1,009 metres (3,310 ft) at 3.8 kilometres (2.4 mi) to the west; another peak reaches 1,009 metres (3,310 ft) at 2.0 kilometres (1.2 mi) to the southeast. The mouth of this lake is located at:

- 10.6 kilometres (6.6 mi) north-east of the course of the Sainte-Anne River;
- 5.9 kilometres (3.7 mi) south of the confluence of the Pied du Mont stream and the Mares river;
- 10.7 kilometres (6.6 mi) south-west of the mouth of the rivière des Mares (Gouffre River tributary) (confluence with the rivière du Gouffre);
- 10.8 kilometres (6.7 mi) south-west of Baie-Saint-Paul town center.

From its source, the course of the Pied du Mont stream descends on 8.4 kilometres (5.2 mi) with a drop of 236 metres (774 ft), according to the following segments:

- 3.4 kilometres (2.1 mi) to the north, winding in places, to a stream (coming from the south-west);
- 0.9 kilometres (0.56 mi) first towards the north in a plain, then towards the northwest by winding up to a bend of the river corresponding to the confluence of the rivière à Ange from West);
- 1.1 kilometres (0.68 mi) first towards the north, then forming a hook of 0.4 kilometres (0.25 mi) towards the south-east before returning towards the north, up to the Seminary path;
- 3.0 kilometres (1.9 mi) towards the north by crossing a series of rapids, then in an increasingly deep valley, until its mouth.

The Pied du Mont stream flows into a bend in the South bank of the rivière des Mares (Gouffre River tributary) in Baie-Saint-Paul. This mouth is located at:

- 1.9 kilometres (1.2 mi) north of Chemin du Séminaire;
- 3.4 kilometres (2.1 mi) north-west of the village center of Saint-Placide-Nord
- 10.2 kilometres (6.3 mi) west of downtown Baie-Saint-Paul;
- 11.8 kilometres (7.3 mi) north-west of the confluence of the Rivière du Gouffre and the Saint Lawrence River.

From the mouth of the Pied du Mont stream, the current descends on 11.0 kilometres (6.8 mi) the course of the Mares river; then on 7.8 kilometres (4.8 mi) with a drop of 15 metres (49 ft) following the course of the Rivière du Gouffre which flows into Baie-Saint-Paul in the Saint-Laurent river.

== Toponymy ==
This descriptive toponymic designation was whose use was confirmed by the Quebec Seminary, was listed in 1996. The club Ruisseau du Pied du Mont, number 309, is located there. Variants of the official name: Ruisseau de la Mare and Ruisseau des Monts.

The toponym “Pied du Mont stream” was formalized on March 25, 1997, at the Place Names Bank of the Commission de toponymie du Québec.

== Appendices ==
=== Related articles ===
- Charlevoix Regional County Municipality
- Baie-Saint-Paul, a city
- Rivière à Ange
- Rivière des Mares (Gouffre River tributary)
- Rivière du Gouffre
- St. Lawrence River
- List of rivers of Quebec
