= Rivière à Ange =

Location
- Country: Canada
- Province: Quebec
- Region: Capitale-Nationale
- Regional County Municipality: Charlevoix Regional County Municipality
- City: Baie-Saint-Paul

Physical characteristics
- Source: Grand lac à Ange
  - location: Baie-Saint-Paul
  - coordinates: 47.45370°N 70.71042°W
  - elevation: 771 m (2,530 ft)
- Mouth: Ruisseau du Pied du Mont
  - location: Baie-Saint-Paul
  - coordinates: 47.46167°N 70.64472°W
  - elevation: 480 m (1,570 ft)
- Length: 5.0 km (3.1 mi)

Basin features
- Tributaries
  - left: (from the mouth) Bras Nord de la rivière à Ange, Lac Paradis outlet.
  - right: (from the mouth) A stream.

The rivière à Ange (English: Angel River) is a tributary of the West shore of the ruisseau du Pied du Mont (English: stream of the Mount Foot), flowing entirely in the town of Baie-Saint-Paul, in the Charlevoix Regional County Municipality, in the administrative region of Capitale-Nationale, in the province of Quebec, in Canada.

This valley is mainly served by a secondary forest road which connects to the Seminary road which cuts the intermediate part of the Pied du Mont stream. Forestry is the main economic activity in this valley; recreational tourism, second.

The surface of the Ange river is generally frozen from the beginning of December until the beginning of April; however, safe circulation on the ice is generally done from mid-December to the end of March. The water level of the river varies with the seasons and the precipitation; the spring flood generally occurs in April.

== Geography ==
The river at Ange takes its source at the mouth of Grand lac à Ange (length: 1.2 kilometres (0.75 mi); altitude: 771 metres (2,530 ft)). This lake is enclosed between the mountains, a summit of which reaches 887 metres (2,910 ft) at 1.6 kilometres (0.99 mi) to the northeast; a summit reached 977 metres (3,205 ft) at 2.1 kilometres (1.3 mi) to the west; the summit of Montagne du Lac à Ange reaching 1,089 metres (3,573 ft) to 1.3 kilometres (0.81 mi) to the south. The mouth of this lake is located at:

- 6.5 kilometres (4.0 mi) north-east of the course of the Sainte-Anne River;
- 4.93 kilometres (3.06 mi) south-west of the confluence of the river at Ange and the ruisseau du Pied du Mont;
- 14.6 kilometres (9.1 mi) south-west of the mouth of the rivière des Mares (confluence with the Rivière du Gouffre);
- 15.5 kilometres (9.6 mi) south-west of Baie-Saint-Paul town center.

From its source, the course of the river at Ange descends on 5.0 kilometres (3.1 mi) with a drop of 291 metres (955 ft), according to the following segments:

- 3.0 metres (9.8 ft)), collecting the outlet (coming from the northwest) from Lac Paradis, to the North Arm of the Rivière à Ange (constituting the outlet of Petit lac à Ange);
- 2.0 kilometres (1.2 mi) towards the east in a deep valley by forming a curve towards the north to go around a mountain, until its mouth.

The river at Ange flows in a bend on the west bank of the ruisseau du Pied du Mont in Baie-Saint-Paul. This mouth is located at:

- 0.6 kilometres (0.37 mi) south of the seminar road;
- 4.1 kilometres (2.5 mi) south-west of the village center of Saint-Placide-Nord
- 10.8 kilometres (6.7 mi) west of downtown Baie-Saint-Paul;
- 12.3 kilometres (7.6 mi) west of the confluence of the Gouffre river and the St. Lawrence River.

From the mouth of the river at Ange, the current descends on 4.1 kilometres (2.5 mi) the course of the ruisseau du Pied du Mont; on 11.0 kilometres (6.8 mi) the course of the Mares river; then on 7.8 kilometres (4.8 mi) with a drop of 15 metres (49 ft) following the course of the Rivière du Gouffre which flows into Baie-Saint-Paul in the Saint-Laurent river.

== Toponymy ==
This toponym appears on a 1955 map. According to oral testimony collected in 1970, this toponym refers to the first name of the guardian of the Lac Équerre facilities.

The toponym “Rivière à Ange” was formalized on March 25, 1997, at the Place Names Bank of the Commission de toponymie du Québec.

== Appendices ==
=== Related articles ===
- Charlevoix Regional County Municipality
- Baie-Saint-Paul, a city
- Ruisseau du Pied du Mont
- Rivière des Mares (Gouffre River tributary)
- Rivière du Gouffre
- St. Lawrence River
- List of rivers of Quebec
