= List of rivers of Quebec =

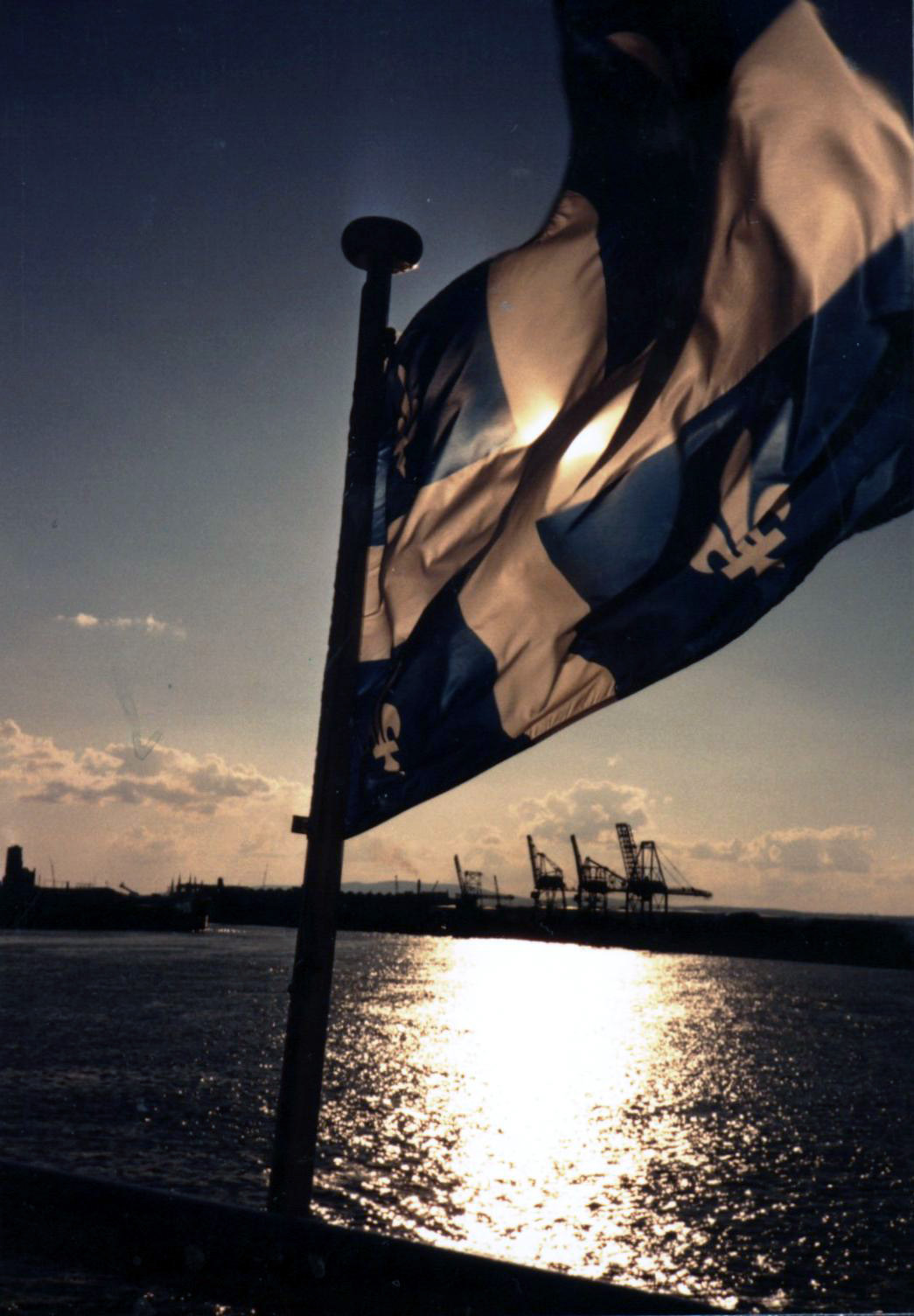

This is a list of rivers of Quebec. Quebec has about:

- One million lakes, of which 62279 have a toponymic designation (a name), plus 218 artificial lakes;
- 15228 watercourses with an official toponymic designation, including 12094 streams and 3134 rivers.

Quebec has 2% of all fresh water on the planet.

== James Bay watershed ==
=== James Bay ===
==== Rivers flowing into James Bay, listed from south to north ====
- Rivière au Saumon (Baie James)
- Rivière au Phoque (Baie James)
- Désenclaves River
- Roggan River
  - Corbin River
  - Anistuwach River
- Kapsaouis River
- Piagochioui River

===== Tributaries of La Grande River =====
- La Grande River (Grand River)
  - Chisasipis River
  - Utahunanis River
  - Kapisichikamastikw River (via LG3 Reservoir)
  - Kanaaupscow River (via LG3 Reservoir)
  - Patukamistikw River (via LG3 reservoir)
  - Griault River (via LG3 reservoir)
  - Kaminahikuschitin Creek
  - Sakustin River
  - Achazi River (via Robert-Bourassa Reservoir)
  - Wapusukatinastikw River
  - La Forge River (via reservoir LG4)
  - Nichicun River (via Nichicun Lake)
  - Sakami River
    - Salomon River
    - Gatinée River
    - Meechishgosheesh River
    - Bulgare River
    - Maugé River
  - La Salle River (La Grande River tributary)
  - Anasakasich River
  - Asatawasach River
  - Pontois River
    - De la Corvette River
  - Kanaaupscow River
    - Chauvreulx River
  - Aigle River (La Grande River tributary) (via Misèle Lake)
- Aquatuc River
- Truite River
- Mouton River
- Caillet River
- Castor River (Beaver River)
  - Castor River East
- Maquatua River
- Sabascunica River
  - Clergue River
- Poplar River
- Vieux Comptoir River (English: Old Factory River)
- Conn River
- Eastmain River
  - Pêche River (Eastmain)
  - Opinaca River
    - Giard River
      - Kawasayakamikastikw River
    - Gipouloux River
    - Little Opinaca River
  - Wabamisk River
  - Eau Claire River
  - Ross River (Eastmain River)
  - Cauouatstacau River
  - Misask River
  - Grand Portage Creek
  - Léran Creek (via Hecla Lake)
  - Des Quatre-Temps River (via Bréhat Lake)
  - Saffray River
  - Tichégami River
    - Mémeshquasati River
  - Déry River
  - Nicolas River
  - Acotago River
  - Wabistane River
  - Causabiscau River
  - Miskimatao River
  - Eau Froide River
- Mouton River
- Octave River (Rupert Bay)
- Jolicoeur River
  - Jolicoeur River North-East
- Moquet River
- À la Truite River (Rupert Bay)
- Pontax River
  - Kaupiyeumuchaushich River
  - Enistuwach River
  - Tetapishu River
  - Wachiskw River
  - Machisakahikanistikw River

===== Tributaries of Rupert River =====
- Rupert River
  - Rivière Jolliet
  - Nemiscau River
  - Lemare River
  - Natastan River
  - Shipastouk River
  - Wabissinane River
  - Mistassini Lake
    - Pepeshquasati River
      - Holton Creek (Pépeshquasati River)
      - Neilson River (Pépeshquasati River)
    - Takwa River
      - Chéno River
      - Kapaquatche River
      - Toco River
      - Cinq Outardes River
      - Albanel Lake
        - Témiscamie River
          - Témis River
            - Misca River (Témis River tributary)
          - Camie River
          - Témiscamie River East
          - Kaawiiskwamekwaachiuch River (via "Indicateur Lake")
            - Atihkaameukw River
          - Perdue River (Témiscamie River)
          - Tournemine River (Témiscamie River)
          - Métawishish River (old name: "Sépanakosipi River")
        - À la Perche River (Mistassini Lake) (via "De l'Esker Bay")
    - Waconichi River (via Du Poste Bay)
      - Waconichi Lake
        - Bignell River (Waconichi River)
    - Pipounichouane River (via "Des Plongeurs Bay")
  - De Maurès River
    - Saint-Urcisse River
  - Marte River

===== Tributaries of Broadback River =====
- Broadback River
  - Châtillon River
  - Assinica River
  - Des Pôles River (through Evans Lake)
  - Theodat River (through Evans Lake)
  - Coigne River
  - Nipukatasi River
  - Kauskatitineu River (through Du Tast Lake and Dana Lake (Eeyou Istchee Baie-James))
  - Pauschikushish Ewiwach River (through Dana Lake (Eeyou Istchee Baie-James) and the Evans Lake)
  - Iyinu Kaniput River (via Dana Lake (Eeyou Istchee Baie-James) and Evans Lake)
    - Matawawaskweyau River
    - Iskaskunikaw River
      - Kakaskutatakuch River
  - Enistustikweyach River (via Dana Lake (Eeyou Istchee Baie-James) and Evans Lake)
    - Upaunan River (via Dana Lake (Eeyou Istchee Baie-James) and Evans Lake)
  - Salamandre River
  - Chabinoche River (through Evans Lake)
  - Ouasouagami River
  - Colomb River
  - Kaminahikuschit River
  - Natouacamisie River
  - Machisipi River
  - Lepallier River
    - Louvart River

===== Tributaries of Nottaway River =====
- Nottaway River
  - Kitchigama River
    - Pahunan River
    - Subercase River (Kitchigama River) (through Grasset Lake)
  - Iroquois River (Nottaway River tributary) (French: Rivière des Iroquois)
    - Fabulet River
  - Richerville River
  - Deux Lacs River (French: Rivière des Deux Lacs)
  - Natchiowatchouan River
  - Muskiki River
  - Davoust River
  - Lake Matagami
    - Gouault River
    - Allard River
      - Ourse River (Allard River tributary)
    - Bell River (see section #Tributaries of Bell River below)
    - Waswanipi River (see section #Tributaries of Waswanipi River below)
    - Canet River
- Novide River

====== Tributaries of Waswanipi River ======
(which empties in Nottaway River via Matagami Lake)

- Waswanipi River
  - Opaoca River (via Olga Lake)
  - Chensagi River (via Goéland Lake (Waswanipi River))
    - Chensagi River West
    - Chensagi River East
  - Maicasagi River (via Goéland Lake (Waswanipi River))
    - Omo River (Quebec)
    - La Trêve River
      - Caupichigau River
      - Mildred River (via La Trêve Lake)
    - Monsan River
    - Inconnue River (Maicasagi River)
      - Nomans River
  - Lake Waswanipi
    - Iserhoff River (via Lake Waswanipi)
      - Iserhoff River North
    - O'Sullivan River (via Lake Waswanipi)
      - Périgny River
    - Bachelor River (via Lake Waswanipi)
      - Little Bachelor River
  - Chibougamau River
    - Brock River (Chibougamau River)
      - Brock River West
      - Brock River North
      - Kaakitchatsekaasich Creek
    - Opémisca River (via Opémisca Lake)
    - Barlow River (Chibougamau River)
      - Blaiklock River
      - Mistago River
      - Chébistuane River
    - Faribault River
    - Chibougamau Lake
      - Blondeau River (Chibougamau Lake)
        - Oreille River
          - Natevier River
      - France River
      - Armitage River
      - Nepton River
        - Nepton River North
      - Énard River
    - Obatogamau River
      - Deux Orignaux River (via Society Lake)
      - Nemenjiche River (via Obatogamau Lakes).
  - Opawica River
    - Little Waswanipi River
    - Nicobi River
      - Wetetnagami River
        - Macoustigane River
        - Saint-Père River
        - Dazemard River
        - Panache River
          - Fortier River (Panache River tributary)
          - Pierrefonds River
        - Muy River (Wetetnagami River)
    - Doda Lake
      - Aigle River (Doda Lake) (French: "rivière de l'Aigle (lac Doda)") (via Doda Lake)
      - Saint-Cyr River (Opawica River)
        - Hébert River
    - Roy River (via the Caopatina Lake)
      - Yvonne River (via Surprise Lake)
    - Cawcot River
    - Queue de Castor River (via the Gabriel Lake)
    - Ventadour River
    - Titipiti River
    - Irene River (Opawica River)

====== Tributaries of Bell River ======
West bank (from the mouth)
- Bell River
  - Indiens River (Bell River tributary) (rivière des Indiens)
  - Esturgeon River (rivière de l'Esturgeon)
  - Kâwâcebîyak River
    - Daniel River (Kâwâcebîyak River)
  - Western Channel (Bell River tributary)
    - Miskomin River
    - Bigniba River
    - Kâhokikak River
  - Laflamme River
    - Bernetz River
    - Castagnier River
      - Rivière Vassal
    - Despinassy River
    - Bartouille River
    - La Morandière River
    - Lapromanade River
    - Des Aulnes River (Laflamme River tributary)
  - Kâk River
  - Laas River
  - Taschereau River (Bell River tributary)
    - Noire River (Courville Lake)
    - Ducros River
    - La Petite Rivière (Taschereau River tributary)
  - Boucane River
  - Des Peupliers River

East bank (from the mouth)

- Bell River
  - Baptiste River
  - Florence River
  - Wedding River
  - Quévillon River
    - Wilson River (Quévillon Lake)
  - Cuvillier River
    - Kiask River
    - Tonnancour River
  - Robin River (Parent Lake)
    - Lecompte River
  - Delestres River
  - Du Hibou River (Parent Lake)
  - Brassier River
  - Mégiscane River
    - Collin River (Mégiscane River tributary)
    - Bastien River
    - Capousacataca River
    - Achepabanca River
      - Achepabanca River North-East
    - Macho River (via Berthelot Lake)
      - Closse River
    - Suzie River
    - Kekek River
      - Trévet River
    - Serpent River (Mégiscane River)
    - Whitegoose River
    - Saint-Cyr River South
    - Pascagama River (via Pascagama Lake)
      - Chartrand River
      - Kaapicikatew River
    - Berthelot River
    - Attic River
    - Assup River
    - Tavernier River
  - Senneterre River
    - Lepage River
  - Louvicourt River
    - Roquetaillade River (through Pascalis Lake)
    - Pascalis River (through Pascalis Lake)
    - Tiblemont River
    - Marrias River (Louvicourt River tributary)
    - Villebon River tributary)
      - Rivière Saint-Félix
      - Marquis River
        - Saint-Vincent River
        - Shamus River

==== Quebec rivers flowing in Ontario (or tributaries of Ontario rivers) ====
Main Quebec rivers flowing up to Ontario bank of James Bay, listed from East to West:

- Little Missisicabi River
- Missisicabi River
  - Iscouistic River
  - Patrick River (Missisicabi River tributary)
  - Obamsca River
  - Missisicabi River East
  - Missisicabi River West
- Piscapecassy River

Right bank of Harricana River (from the Mouth)

- Harricana River
  - Joncas River
    - Des Aulnes River (Joncas River tributary)
  - Samson River
  - Adam River (Harricana River)
  - Coigny River
  - Miniac River
  - Obalski River
    - Obalski River South
  - Chevalier River (Harricana River tributary)
  - Landrienne River
    - Peter Brown River
      - Martel River
  - Baillairgé River
  - La Corne River
  - Laine River
    - Vassan River
  - Fiedmont River
  - Senneville River
    - Courville River

Left bank of Harricana River (from the Mouth)

- Harricana River
  - Corner River (Ontario)
  - Again River (Quebec and Ontario)
  - Malouin River
    - Mannerelle River
  - Breynat River
  - Despreux River
  - Turgeon River (Harricana River tributary) (Quebec and Ontario)
    - Martigny River (Québec)
    - Detour River (Eeyou Istchee Baie-James) (Ontario and Quebec)
    - Garneau River (Ontario and Quebec)
    - Turcotte River (Ontario and Quebec)
      - Little Turcotte River (Ontario)
    - Chabbie River Ontario and Quebec)
    - Burntbush River (Ontario)
    - North Burntbush River (Ontario)
      - Mikwam River (Ontario)
    - Patten River (Quebec and Ontario)
      - South Patten River (Ontario)
      - Little Clive River (Ontario)
    - Kabika River (Ontario) (Ontario)
      - Case River (Ontario)
        - Kenning River (Ontario)
      - East Kabika River (Ontario)
    - Patten River (Ontario and Quebec)
      - South Patten River (Ontario)
    - Boivin River
    - Lavergne River (via Lake Turgeon (Eeyou Istchee Baie-James))
    - Ojima River (via Lake Turgeon (Eeyou Istchee Baie-James))
    - Corset River
    - Enjalran River
    - Théo River
    - Wawagosic River
      - Menard River
      - Perdrix River (Eeyou Istchee Baie-James) (French: Rivière de la Perdrix)
        - Trudelle River
      - Mistaouac River
      - Tangente River
      - Kadabakato River
  - Angle River
  - Plamondon River
  - Gale River
  - Octave River (Harricana River tributary)
    - Authier River (through Chicobi Lake)
    - Chicobi River (through Chicobi Lake)
  - Desboues River
  - Berry River
  - Davy River
    - Dalquier River
  - Héva River (through Malartic Lake)
    - Little Héva River
  - Malartic River (through Malartic Lake)
  - Milky River
    - Thompson River (De Montigny Lake tributary)
      - Piché River
        - Fournière River (through Fournière Lake)
      - Surimau River (through "Mourier Lake")
      - Claire River (Thompson River tributary) (through "Mourier Lake")
  - Bourlamaque River
    - Sabourin River
    - Colombière River
    - Laverdière River

Tributaries of Moose River (Ontario)

- Moose River
  - Abitibi River (Ontario)
    - La Reine River (Abitibi Lake) (Quebec and Ontario) (through Abitibi Lake)
      - Chaboillez River (Quebec)
    - Maine River (Abitibi Lake) (through Abitibi Lake)
    - La Sarre River (through Abitibi Lake)
      - Méloizes River (Quebec)
      - Portage River (La Sarre River tributary)
      - South River (La Sarre River tributary)
      - Macamic Lake
        - Macamic River
          - Petite rivière Macamic
        - Bellefeuille River (Macamic Lake)
          - Little Bellefeuille River
        - Loïs River
          - Fréville River
    - Dagenais River (through Abitibi Lake)
      - Palmarolle River
      - Poularies River
    - Cachée River (Abitibi Lake) (throughAbitibi Lake)
    - Duparquet River (through Abitibi Lake)
      - Magusi River (through Duparquet Lake)
      - Kanasuta River (through Duparquet Lake)
        - Dasserat River (through Dasserat Lake)
        - Arnoux River (through Arnoux Lake and Dasserat Lake)
      - Mouilleuse River (through Duparquet Lake)
      - D'Alembert River (through Duparquet Lake)
      - Lanaudière River (through Duparquet Lake)
    - Quebec River (through Abitibi Lake)
    - Mattawasaga River (through Abitibi Lake)

== Hudson Bay tributaries (excluding James Bay tributaries) ==
Main rivers flowing into Hudson Bay, listed from south to north:

- Vauquelin River
- Great Whale River (Grande rivière de la Baleine)
  - Kwakwatanikapistikw River
  - Denys River
  - Coats River
  - Laguerne River
- Little Whale River (Petite rivière de la Baleine)
  - Boutin River
- Guillaume-Delisle Lake (named "Richmond Gulf" in the past)
  - North River
  - Clearwater River
  - De Troyes River
- Sheldrke River
- Nastapoka River
  - Itilliq River
- Longland River
- Qikirtaluup Kuunga River
- Gladel River
- Kongut River
- Innuksuac River
- Corneille River
- Nauberakvik River
- Koktac River
  - Aanaakisiuqvik River
- Alinotte River
- Mariet River
  - Saputiapiit River
- Bériau River
- Airlunaaq River
- Polemond River
- Kogaluc River
- Povungnituk River (French: Rivière Puvirnituq)
  - Irsuaq River
  - Little Puvirnituq River
  - Decoumte River
  - Formel River
- Sorehead River
  - Sanirqimatik River
- Iktotat River
- Chukotat River
- Kovik River
  - Durouvray River
  - Derville River
  - Talluup River
  - Umiruup River
- Frichet River

== Hudson Strait watershed ==
Rivers flowing into Hudson Strait, listed from west to east:

- Kuugaq River
- Narrunarluarutaq River
  - Narruniup Kuunga River
- Naujaat River
- Appaajuit River
- Nauyok River
- Guichaud River
- Foucault River
  - Nausarisiq River
  - Gatin River
- Deception River
  - Deception River East
  - Tuttuquaaluk River
- Jacquere River
- Wakeham River
- Latourette River

== Ungava Bay watershed ==
Rivers flowing into Ungava Bay, listed from west to east:

- Arnaud River
  - Buet River
  - Vachon River (Arnaud River)
    - Lestage River
  - Lepelle River
    - Groust River
  - Kuugajaraapik River
  - Hamelin River
  - De Thury River
- Brochant River
- Lefroy River
- Saint-Fond River
- Lac aux Feuilles (Leaves River)
  - Mannic River
  - Buron River
  - Conefroy River
  - Compeau River
  - Deharveng River
    - Sanirqitik River
  - Ungavatuarusik River
  - Bérard River
  - Rivière aux Feuilles (Leaves River)
    - Dufreboy River
    - Kuuguluk River
    - Kuugaapik River
    - Qijuttuuq River
    - Vernot River
    - Nedlouc River
    - Irsuaq River
    - Charpentier River (Carpenter River)
    - Corporon River
    - Péladeau River
    - Cohade River
    - Vizien River
    - Goudalie River
    - Daunais River
- Koksoak River
  - Mélèzes River
    - Potier River
    - Aigneau River
    - Gué River
      - Delay River
  - Caniapiscau River
    - Bras de Fer River (Iron Arm River)
    - Sable River (Sandy River)
      - Kayakawakamau River
    - Goodwood River
    - Sérigny River
    - Pons River
    - Beurling River
    - Death River (Rivière de la Mort)
    - Châteauguay River
    - Swampy Bay River
    - Situraviup River
    - Forbes River
- False River
- Whale River (Rivière à la Baleine)
  - Wheeler River
  - Savalette River
- Marralik River
- Qurlutuq River
- George River
  - Ford River
  - Falcoz River
  - De Pas River
- Barnoin River
- Koroc River
- Baudan River (via Keglo Bay)
- Baudoncourt River (via Keglo Bay)
- Abrat River
- Qyujjuujaq River
- Bautremont River
- Sapukkait River (via Alluviaq Fjord)
- Alluviaq River (via Alluviaq Fjord)
  - West Wind River (Rivière du Vent d'Ouest)
- Renac River
- Lepers River
- Degesne River
- Baret River

== North shore of St. Lawrence River/Gulf of St. Lawrence watershed ==
Rivers flowing into the St. Lawrence River and Gulf of St. Lawrence, listed in downstream order:

=== Ottawa Valley (east bank) – upper part ===
==== Tributaries of Dozois Reservoir and lower ====
- Ottawa River (Rivière des Outaouais)
  - Chochocouane River
    - Canimimiti River
    - Denain River
    - Yser River
    - Gordon River (Chochocouane River tributary)
  - Capitachouane River
    - Chipilly River
    - Masnières River
    - Vimy River
    - Esperey River
  - Camachigama River
    - Bethune River
  - Doré River (Ottawa River tributary)
  - Kâwânatakodjiwâk River
Note: A section of the Ottawa River is named "Kâwânatakodjiwâk River

==== Tributaries of Decelles Reservoir and lower ====
- Ottawa River
  - Barrière River (through Barrière Bay of Lake des Quinze (Témiscamingue))
  - Solitaire River (through Rémigny Lake)
    - Granville River (through Opasatica Lake)
  - Little Roger River
    - Beaudry River
  - Roger River
  - Kinojevis River
    - Thiballier River
    - Beauchastel River
      - Bellecombe River
      - Pressé River (through Montbeillard Lake)
      - Pelletier River (through Beauchastel Lake)
      - La Bruère River
    - Dufault River
      - Duprat River (through Dufault Lake)
    - Dufresnoy River
      - Bassignac River
    - Villemontel River
  - Cadillac River (via Cadillac Lake) and Preissac Lake)
  - Bousquet River (via the lakes Chassignolle and Preissac)
    - Vaudray River
  - La Pause River (via the lakes Fontbonne, Chassignolle and Preissac)
  - Cléricy River
  - Serment River
  - Darlens River
  - Marrias River (Ottawa River tributary)

South shore of Ottawa River

- Ottawa River
  - Fraser River (Ottawa River tributary)
    - McKenzie River (Fraser River tributary)
    - Des Bois River
    - Blondeau River (Fraser River tributary)
  - McFadden River
  - Chevreuil River (through Lac Simard (Temiscamingue))
  - Klock Creek
    - Guillet River (through Devlin Lake)
  - Winneway River (through Lac Simard (Temiscamingue))
    - Marécageuse River
  - Esturgeon River (Decelles Reservoir)
  - Decelles River

=== Ottawa Valley (Quebec Watershed) – intermediary section (at the Ontario limit) ===
- Rivière à la Loutre
  - Laverlochère River
- Lavallée River
- Kipawa River
  - Des Lacs River
    - Saint-Amand River
  - Audoin River
    - Ostaboningue River
      - Cerise River (Temiscamingue)
      - Saseginaga River
  - Pin Blanc River (Kipawa River tributary)
  - Des Jardins River
- Beauchêne River
- Antoine River (Quebec)
- Maganasipi River
  - Maganasipi River West
  - Maganasipi River East
- Rivière à l'Ours (Témiscamingue)
- Petite rivière à l'Ours (Témiscamingue)
- Dumoine River
  - Fildegrand River
  - Aux Écorces River (Dumoine River tributary)
  - Poussière River
    - Poussière River West
- Saint-Cyr River (Ottawa River)
  - Boom River
  - Chartrand River
- Schyan River
- Noire River
- Coulonge River
  - Perley River
  - Corneille River¸
    - Petite rivière de la Corneille
  - Coulonge River East
    - Petite rivière Picanoc
- Quyon River
- Mohr River

=== Ottawa Valley (Ontario Watershed) – intermediary section (at the Quebec–Ontario limit) ===
- Blanche River (Lake Timiskaming) (through Lake Timiskaming)
  - Englehart River (Ont.)
  - Misema River (Ont.)
    - Little Misema River (Ont.)
  - Lillord Creek (Ont.)
  - Larder River (Ont.)
    - Laberge River (through Hébert Lake, Buies Lake, Raven Lake, Ward Lake) (Ont. and QC)
    - Dufay River (through Buies Lake, Raven Lake, Ward Lake) (QC)

=== Gatineau River Valley – lower part ===
==== Gatineau Valley (west bank) ====
- Gatineau River
  - La Pêche River (Gatineau River tributary)
    - La Pêche River South
  - Kazabazua River
  - Brown River (Gatineau River tributary)
  - Picanoc River
    - Blue Sea River
    - Dumont River (Picanoc River tributary)
  - Desert River
    - Aigle River (Desert River tributary) (Eagle River)
    - Hibou River (Aigle River tributary) (rivière du Hibou)
    - Pierreuse River (Desert River tributary)
    - Bras Coupé River
    - Ignace River
    - Tomasine River
  - Gens de Terre River
    - Serpent River
    - Carpe River (Gens de Terre River tributary) (Rivière à la Carpe)
  - Des Seize River
  - Wapus River
    - Lecointre River
  - Cabonga Reservoir
    - Cabonga River
      - Swannee River (Rivière Swannee)
  - Bélinge River
    - Wahoo River
  - Argent River
  - Petawaga River
  - Chouart River
  - Rapids River (Gatineau River tributary) (Rivière des Rapides)
  - Lac du Pain de Sucre River (La Tuque)
    - Tamarac River (Gatineau River)
    - Clova River
      - McLaren River
      - White River (Clova River tributary)
    - Douville River
- East bank of Gatineau River (from the upper part)
  - Du Plomb River
  - Joseph River (Gatineau River tributary)
  - Fortier River (Gatineau River tributary)
    - Gosselin River (Fortier River tributary)
  - Misère River
  - Coucou River
  - Chabot River
    - Choquette River
  - Canot River
  - Bazin River
    - Bleuets River (Bazin River tributary)
      - Shingle River
    - Marte River (La Tuque)
    - Dandurand River
      - Bellerive River
    - Nasigon River
  - Lesueur River
    - Duplessis River
  - Notawassi River
    - Thompson River (Notawassi Lake tributary) (via Notawassi Lake)

==== Ottawa Valley (east bank, Quebec) – lower part ====
- Blanche River
- Little White River
- Lièvre River (Hare River)
  - Mitchinamecus River
    - Pierre River (Mitchinamecus River tributary)
  - Mazana River
  - Tapani River
  - Adonis River
  - Cabasta River
    - Kakw River
  - Nemiscachingue River
- Little White River
- Petite-Nation River (Rivière de la petite Nation)
  - Little Route River
    - Little Rouge River East
  - Saint-Sixte River
- Saumon River
  - Rivière Saumon Ouest
- Little Salmon River
- Rivière Rouge**Rouge River (Red River)
  - Maskinongé River
  - Nominingue River
  - Lenoir River
  - Macaza River
    - Jamet River
  - Devil River (Rivière du Diable)
  - Beaven River
- Calumet River (Rivière du Calumet)
- Kingham River

=== Basse-Laurentides – Lac des Deux Montagnes and rivière des Mille Îles ===
Rive Nord, en ordre de l'Ouest vers l'Est:

North shore of lac des Deux-Montagnes
- Ottawa River
  - Rivière du Nord
    - Rivière de l'Ouest
      - Dalesville River
      - Rivière de l'Est
    - Rivière Bellefeuille
    - Rivière à Simon
    - Rivière aux Mulets
    - Rivière Noire
    - Rivière Doncaster
    - Rivière Sainte-Marie
    - Rivière Rouge
  - Rivière aux Serpents (Parc national d'Oka)

North shore of Rivière des Mille Îles

- Rivière des Mille-Îles
  - Rivière du Chêne
  - Rivière du Chicot
  - Cachée River (rivière des Mille Îles)
  - Rivière aux Chiens
  - Mascouche River
    - Saint Pierre River
    - Saint Pierre River

=== Ottawa Valley (south bank) ===
- Rigaud River
- Raquette River (Ottawa River)

=== Haut Saint-Laurent sector (north bank) ===
North shore of St. Lawrence River

- Beaudette River
- Delisle River
- Rouge River
- Graisse River

=== Montreal area ===
See: List of rivers and water bodies of Montreal Island

Jesus Island (Laval, Quebec)

Note: No rivers on Jesus Island

Island of Montreal

- Saint Pierre River
- Lachine Canal
- Canal de l'Aqueduc
- Sainte-Anne-de-Bellevue Canal

=== Watershed of l'Assomption River ===
- L'Assomption River
  - l'Achigan River
    - Jourdain River
    - Abercromby River
    - Beauport River
    - La Petite Rivière
  - Saint-Esprit River
  - Saint-Georges Brook
  - Ouareau River
    - Burton River
    - Jean-Venne River
      - Kenny River
    - Baulne River
    - Dufresne River
    - Nord River
    - Trudel River
    - Rouge River
      - Blanche River
      - Le Grand Ruisseau
    - Saint-Michel River (via Archambault Lake (Saint-Donat))
  - Noire River
    - Blanche River
    - Leprohon River
    - Crique à David
  - Rivière de la Boule
  - Versailles River
  - Grande rivière Swaggin
    - Petite rivière Swaggin
  - McGee River
  - Lavigne River
  - Ruisseau du Point du Jour

=== North shore of St Lawrence river – between Repentigny and Trois-Rivières ===
- Saint-Jean River
  - Saint-Antoine River
- Saint-Joseph River
- Chaloupe River
- Bayonne River
  - Branche de la rivière Bayonne
  - Berthier River
  - Bonaventure River
- Chicot River
  - Sainte-Catherine River
- Cachée River (D'Autray)
- Bois Blanc River
- Maskinongé River
  - L'Ormière River
  - Maskinongé Lake
    - Matambin River
    - Mastigouche River
      - Branche à Gauche - Mastigouche River
        - Rivière du Lac Gauthier
      - Mastigouche River North
  - Mandeville River
  - Blanche River (Maskinongé River tributary)
    - Rouge River (Blanche River - Maskinongé River tributary)
- Rivière du Loup
  - Petite rivière du Loup
  - Saint-Louis River (Du Loup River tributary)
  - Chacoura River
  - Sacacomie River
  - Rivière des Îles
    - Sans Bout River
  - Eau Claire River
  - Roi River
- Little Yamachiche River
- Yamachiche River
  - Machiche River
    - Rivière du Lac des Îles
    - Rivière du Sept
    - Bras du Nord (Machiche River tributary)/Petite rivière Saint-Étienne
- Rivière aux Sables
- Millette River

=== Watershed of Saint-Maurice River ===
Rivers flowing into the Saint Lawrence River and Gulf of Saint Lawrence, listed in downstream order:

West bank

- Saint-Maurice River
  - Cyprès River
  - Najoua River
  - Manouane River (La Tuque)
    - Ruban River
      - Blanche River (La Tuque River tributary)
        - North-West Blanche River (Ruban River tributary)
      - Huot River
      - Pichoui River
        - Pichoui River West
      - Drouin River
    - La Tuque Creek (Manouane River)
    - Caginecti River
    - Kekeo River
    - Manouane Lake (La Tuque)
      - Atim River
        - Sèche River (La Tuque)
      - Sarto River
      - Kempt Lake (La Tuque)
        - Paconsigane River
        - Métabeskéga River
        - Alexandrie River
        - Morialice River
    - Mondonac River
    - Canatagami River
  - Little Flamand River
  - Flamand River
    - Flamand River West
      - Frémont Lake
        - North River (Frémont Lake)
  - Vermillion
    - Prairies River (Vermillon River tributary)
    - Goulet River (Vermillon River tributary)
    - Savane River (Vermillon River tributary)
    - Picard River
    - Livernois River
  - Rivière au Lait
  - Rivière-aux-Rats
    - Petite rivière-aux-Rats
  - Wessonneau River
    - Wessonneau River North
      - Wessonneau du Milieu River
  - Bête Puante River (Beast Puante River)
  - Mattawin River
    - Aigles River (Mékinac)
    - Chienne River (Mékinac)
    - Lachance River (Mékinac)
    - Cenelles River
    - Poste River
      - Villiers River
    - Rivière du Milieu
      - Laviolette River
      - Laviolette River West
      - Laviolette River East
      - Boullé River
      - Aulnaies River (Milieu River tributary)
    - Sauvage River
    - Matawin River West
    - Anticamamac River
  - Pêche River
  - Piles River
  - Grand-Mère River
  - Shawinigan River
  - Bernier River (Saint-Maurice River tributary)
    - Blanche River (Bernier River tributary)

East bank

- Saint-Maurice River
  - Wabano River
    - Faguy River
    - Wabano River West
    - Loup River (Wabano River tributary)
      - Loup River West (Lac-Ashuapmushuan)
    - Doré River (Wabano River tributary)
    - Cécile River
  - Petit Rocher River
  - Jolie River (La Tuque)
  - Windigo River
    - Windigo River West
    - Windigo River North-West
    - Cabeloga River
  - Sauvages Brook (reservoir Blanc)
  - Jolie River (reservoir Blanc)
    - Jolie River West
  - Grand Pierriche River (generally named "Grande rivière Pierriche")
    - Pierriche Nord-Ouest River
      - Chacola River
    - Pierriche du Milieu River
    - Branche Nord-Est de la Pierriche
  - Little Pierriche River
  - La Trenche
    - De la Tête à l'Ours River
    - Bonhomme River
    - Trenche Sud River
    - Trenche Est River
      - Petite rivière Trenche Ouest
    - Raimbault River
      - Aux Eaux Mortes River (Raimbault River tributary)
      - Raimbault Est River
  - À la Corne River
  - Du Mâle River
    - Du Mâle Nord River
  - Chaumonot River
  - Croche
    - Patrick River (Croche River tributary)
    - Du Brûlé River (Croche River tributary)
    - Petite rivière Croche
      - Petite rivière Croche Nord
  - Bostonnais
    - Borgia River
    - Pequaquasoui River
    - Bostonnais Chenal
    - Stewart River (Bostonnais River tributary)
  - Little Bostonnais
    - Le Fouet River
    - Épervier River
    - Mystérieuse River
  - Grosbois River
  - Small Stream River (generally named: "La Petite Rivière" in French)
  - L'Oiseau River
  - Caribou River
  - Mekinac River
    - Boucher River
    - Rivière du Milieu
      - Bessonne River
      - Brochets River (Lac-Masketsi)
      - Eaux-Mortes River
  - Noire River (Shawinigan)
  - Rouilles River
  - Cachée River (Saint-Maurice River tributary)

==== Gouin Reservoir ====
(Clockwise from the mouth)

- Jean-Pierre River (Gouin Reservoir)
- Atimokateiw River
- De La Galette River (Gouin Reservoir)
  - Leblanc River (Gouin Reservoir)
- Wacekamiw River (via Mikisiw Amirikanan Lake)
- Nemio River (via the Bureau Lake)
- Oskélanéo River (via the Bureau Lake)
  - Mistatikamekw River
- Outlet of Tessier Lake (via Saraana Bay)
  - Faucher River
- Flapjack River (via Mattawa Bay)
- Bignell Creek (via Adolphe-Poisson Bay)
- Mégiscane River
  - Suzie River
- Plamondon Creek (Gouin Reservoir) (via Plamondon Bay (Gouin Reservoir)
- Piponisiw River (via Simard Lake and Miller Lake)
- De la Rencontre Creek
- Toussaint River
- Mathieu River
- Kakospictikweak River (via Omina Lake)
  - Pokotciminikew River
  - Wawackeciw River
- Kakiskeaskoparinaniwok River (linking Omina Lake and Verreau Bay)
- Eau Claire Creek (Gouin Reservoir) (via Verreau Bay)
  - Ohomisiw River (via Witiko Lake)
- Verreau Creek (via Verreau Bay)
- Sakiciw River
- Barras Creek (via Magnan Lake)
  - Oskatcickic Creek
- Nimepir River (linked to Magnan Lake)
- Papactew River (via Magnan Lake)
- Kiackw River (via Magnan Lake)
- Wapous River (via Magnan Lake)
- Au Vison River (via Au Vison Bay)
- Au Vison River West (via Au Vison Bay)

=== North shore downstream of Trois-Rivières ===
- Champlain River
  - Brûlée River
  - Rivière au Lard (Champlain River)
  - Rivière à la Fourche (Champlain River)
    - Noire River (Fourche River tributary)

=== Batiscan River Valley ===
- Batiscan River
  - Rivière aux Castors Noirs
    - Aberdeen River (via Lac aux Biscuits)
  - Rivière aux Éclairs
  - Miguick River
  - Rivière à Pierre (Batiscan River tributary)
    - Blanche River (rivière à Pierre)
    - Petite rivière Batiscan
  - Veillet River (Rivière à Veillet)
  - Jeannotte River
    - Rivière aux Rognons
    - Petite rivière Vermillon
    - Ruisseau du Lac au Lard
      - Lac au Lard
        - Doucet River (Jeannotte River) (via "Lac au Lard")
  - Serpentine River
  - Propre River, Quebec
  - Tawachiche River
    - Tawachiche West River (Rivière Tawachiche Ouest)
  - Pierre-Paul River
  - Rivière des Envies
    - Tortue River (Rivière à la Tortue)
    - North Mékinac River
      - South Mékinac River
  - Rivière des Chutes
  - Rivière-à-la-Lime

=== East of Batiscan River ===
- Sainte-Anne River
  - Charest River
  - Niagarette River
    - Petite rivière Niagarette
  - Noire River
    - Blanche River
      - Blanc Lake (Saint-Ubalde)
        - Rivière des Pins (Blanc Lake)
      - Weller River
  - Jacquot River
    - Americaine River
    - Rondeau River
  - Bras du Nord (Sainte-Anne River tributary)
    - Mauvaise River
      - Cachée River (Mauvaise River tributary)
    - Sainte-Anne Ouest River
    - Neilson River (Bras du Nord)
    - Rivière de la Roche Plate
    - Écartée River
  - Verte River
  - Talayarde River
    - Talayarde North-East River
  - Chézine River (Sainte-Anne River)
    - Chézine North River
  - Tourilli River
  - Rivière aux Ours (Sainte-Anne River)
- Rivière du Moulin (Deschambault-Grondines)
  - Rivière des Étangs
- La Chevrotière River
- Portneuf River
  - Rivière des Sept Îles
    - Rivière d'Aulnage
  - Chaude River
  - Saint-Jacques River (Portneuf River)
  - Sept Îles Lake (Saint-Raymond)
    - Gosford River
- Jacques-Cartier River
  - Ontaritzi River
    - Saint-Joseph Lake (La Jacques-Cartier)
      - Rivière aux Pins (Saint-Joseph Lake)
        - Rivière de la Somme
        - Petite rivière aux Pins
  - Cassian River
  - Cook River (Jacques-Cartier River tributary)
  - Cachée River (Jacques-Cartier River tributary)
  - Rivière à l'Épaule
  - Sautauriski River
    - Rivière à la Chute (Sautauriski River)
  - Rivière Jacques-Cartier Nord-Ouest
    - Rivière Jacques-Cartier Sud
    - Cavée River
  - Rivière du Malin
    - Rocheuse River (rivière du Malin)
  - Launière River
    - Rivière du Milieu (Launière River)
  - Rivière aux Pommes
    - Noire River (rivière aux Pommes)
- Rivière à Matte
- Rivière des Roches (Saint-Augustin-de-Desmaures)
- Charland River
- Rivière du Curé
- Rivière du Cap Rouge
- Saint-Charles River (Québec City)
  - Lorette River
  - Nelson River
    - La Petite Rivière (Nelson River tributary)
  - Saint-Charles Lake
    - Rivière des Hurons (Saint-Charles Lake)
      - Hibou River
      - Noire River (rivière des Hurons)
      - Turgeon River (rivière des Hurons)
  - Jaune River (Saint-Charles River)
  - Rivière du Berger
    - Rivière des Roches (rivière du Berger)
    - Rivière des Sept Ponts
  - Lairet River

=== East of Quebec City on north shore ===
- Montmorency River
  - Rivière du Lac
  - Rivière aux Pins (Montmorency River tributary)
  - Richelieu River (Montmorency River tributary)
  - Rivière à l'Île (ex-river "Saint-Adolphe River")
  - Noire River (Montmorency River)
  - Rivière des Neiges
    - Savane River (Rivière des Neiges tributary)
    - Rivière du Camp Brûlé
  - Blanche River (Montmorency River tributary)
  - Smith River (Montmorency River tributary) (ex-rivière de la Décharge)
    - Petite rivière Smith
  - Rouge River (Montmorency River tributary)
    - Rouge River East
  - Ferrée River (Montmorency River tributary)
    - Rivière la Retenue
- Rivière du Petit Pré
- Valin River (La Côte-de-Beaupré)
- Cazeau River
- Le Moyne River
- Rivière du Sault à la Puce (Rivière du Sault à la Puce)
- Rivière aux Chiens
  - Rivière des Sept Crans
- Sainte-Anne River (Beaupré)
  - Jean-Larose River
  - Rivière des Roches (Sainte-Anne River tributary)
  - Petite rivière Savane (Sainte-Anne River tributary)
  - Rivière du Mont Saint-Étienne
  - Brulée River (Sainte-Anne River tributary)
  - Rivière Savane du Nord
  - Lombrette River
    - Rivière des Chenaux
- Petite rivière Saint-François
- Ruisseau de la Martine
  - Rivière du Sault (Charlevoix)
- La Vieille Rivière (Charlevoix)
- Rivière du Moulin (Baie-Saint-Paul)
- Rivière du Gouffre
  - Bras du Nord-Ouest (Gouffre River tributary)
    - Rivière à Idas
  - Renaud River
  - Rivière des Mares (Gouffre River tributary)
    - Ruisseau du Pied du Mont
      - Rivière à Ange
    - La Grosse Décharge Ouest
      - La Grosse Décharge Est
  - Remy River
  - Le Gros Bras (Gouffre River tributary)
    - Rivière des Monts
    - Le Petit Bras (Le Gros Bras)
  - Rivière du Gouffre Sud-Ouest
  - Rivière des Îlets (rivière du Gouffre)
  - Rivière de Chicago
  - Rivière à la Loutre (Gouffre River tributary)
  - Ruisseau de la Goudronnerie
- Rivière des Boudreault
- Rivière du Seigneur
  - Armand-Jude River
- Jean-Noël River
  - Rivière du Premier Rang
  - Rivière Jean-Noël Nord-Est
- Mailloux River
- Malbaie River
  - Petite rivière Malbaie
  - Barley River
  - Porc-Épic River
  - Rivière des Martres
  - Rivière de l'Enfer
  - Chemin des Canots River
  - Rivière à la Cruche (Malbaie River)
  - Ruisseau à John (Malbaie River)
  - Snigole River
  - Jacob River, Quebec
  - Comporté River
- Rivière à la Loutre (La Malbaie)
- Port au Saumon River
- Port au Persil River
- Rivière Noire
  - Rivière Noire Sud-Ouest
  - Rivière Noire du Milieu
- Port aux Quilles River
- Rivière de la Baie des Rochers

=== Watershed of Saguenay River ===
South shore (from the mouth of Saguenay River)

- Saguenay River
  - Petites Îles River
  - Saint-Étienne River (Saguenay River)
  - Saint-Athanase River
  - Petit Saguenay River
    - Deschênes River (Petit Saguenay River Tributary)
    - Portage River (Petit-Saguenay River tributary)
    - Cabanage River
  - Saint-Jean River (Saguenay River tributary)
    - Bras à Pierre
    - Cami River
      - Rivière à la Catin
      - La Petite Rivière (Cami River tributary)
        - Épinglette Stream
    - Brébeuf Lake (Saint-Jean River tributary)
      - Pierre River (Brébeuf Lake)
      - Bras de Ross (Brébeuf Lake)
  - Éternité River
  - Rivière à la Croix (Saguenay River tributary)
  - Ha! Ha! River (Saguenay River)
    - Bras d'Hamel
      - Bras Rocheux
    - Rivière à Pierre (Ha! Ha! River tributary)
    - Huard River
    - Rivière des Cèdres (Ha! Ha! River)
  - Rivière à Mars
    - Bras du Coco
    - Rivière à Mars North-West
    - Bras de l'Enfer (rivière à Mars)
    - Bras d'Isaïe
      - Bras des Mouches
    - La Grosse Décharge (Mars River tributary)
      - La Petite Décharge (La Grosse Décharge)
  - Rivière à Benjamin
  - Gauthier River (Saguenay River)
  - Rivière du Moulin (Saguenay River tributary)
    - Bras de Jacob
      - Bras Henriette
      - Bras de Jacob Ouest
    - Bras Sec (rivière du Moulin)
  - Rivière aux Rats (Saguenay)
  - Chicoutimi River
    - Kenogami Lake
      - Simoncouche River
      - Cyriac River
        - Gilbert River (Cyriac River)
        - Normand River
        - Jean-Boivin River
        - Petite rivière Jean-Boivin
      - Pikauba River
        - Ruisseau L'Abbé
        - Bras des Angers
        - Apica River
        - Pika River
        - Petite rivière Pikauba
        - Rivière aux Écorces (Pikauba River)
          - Sawine River
          - Morin River
          - Rivière aux Canots (rivière aux Écorces)
            - Rivière aux Canots Est
          - Trompeuse River
          - rivière aux Écorces North-East
          - rivière aux Écorces du Milieu
      - Cascouia River
  - Rivière aux Sables (Saguenay River)
  - Rivière du Lac Onésime
  - Dorval River
    - Bruyère River
  - La Petite Décharge (Saguenay River tributary)
    - Bédard River (Saguenay River)
      - Raquette River (Bédard River)
      - Petite rivière Bédard

North shore (from the mouth of Saguenay River)

- Saguenay River
  - Sainte-Marguerite River
    - Caribou River (Sainte-Marguerite River tributary)
    - Bras des Murailles
      - Boivin River (Bras des Murailles)
    - Sainte-Marguerite Nord-Est River
      - Olaf River
      - Petite rivière des Savanes (Sainte-Marguerite River tributary)
    - Épinette River
  - Rivière de la Descente des Femmes
  - Pelletier River (Saguenay River)
  - Rivière aux Outardes (Saguenay River tributary)
    - Rivière aux Foins (rivière aux Outardes tributary)
  - Rivière à la Loutre (Saguenay River tributary)
  - Valin River (Saguenay River tributary)
    - Le Petit Bras (Valin River tributary)
    - Bras Fournier
    - Bras des Canots
    - Saint-Louis River (Valin River tributary)
    - Bras de l'Enfer (Valin River tributary)
    - Bras du Nord (Valin River tributary)
      - Bras de Fer (bras du Nord)
  - Caribou River (Saguenay River tributary)
  - Michaud River (Saguenay River)
  - Rivière aux Vases (Saguenay River tributary)
    - Bras Cimon
    - Hood River
  - Shipshaw River
    - De la Boiteuse River (via Onatchiway Lake)
    - Rivière du Portage (Shipshaw River)
    - Onatchiway River (via Petit lac Onatchiway)
      - Rivière au Poivre (via Louise Lake)
  - Beauchêne River (Shipshaw River)
    - De la Tête Blanche River
      - Petite rivière de la Tête Blanche
      - Beauséjour River (Tête Blanche River)
      - À la Hache River
      - Rivière de la Petite Hache (via "Lac de la Petite Hache")
    - Des Huit Chutes River
      - Rivière des Huit Chutes Est
    - Nisipi River
    - Étienne River (Shipshaw River)
  - Rivière des Aulnaies (Saguenay River tributary)
    - Labonté River
    - Des Habitants River
    - Rivière à l'Ours (rivière des Aulnaies)
  - La Grande Décharge (Saguenay River tributary)
    - Mistouk River
      - Le Petit Mistouk
      - Au Sable River (Mistouk River tributary) (via Labrecque Lake)
    - Aux Harts River
    - Rivière aux Chicots

=== Tributaries of Lac Saint-Jean ===
In order in hourly turn from Saguenay River.

- La Belle Rivière (Lac Saint-Jean)
  - Rivière des Aulnaies (la Belle Rivière)
  - Rivière du Milieu (lac de la Belle Rivière)
- Couchepaganiche River
  - Couchepaganiche East River
- Métabetchouane River
  - MacDonald River (Métabetchouane River)
  - L'Abbé River (Métabetchouane River)
  - Rivière à la Carpe (Métabetchouane River)
  - Rivière aux Canots (Métabetchouane River)
  - Moncouche River
    - Rivière aux Montagnais
      - Ruisseau Contourné
  - Métascouac River
  - Métascouac South River
  - Métabetchouane East River
  - Rivière de la Place
  - Rivière à la Chute (Métabetchouane River)
  - Rivière de la Chaine
  - Prudent River
  - Grande rivière Désir
- Rivière à Grignon
- Ouiatchouan River
  - Petite rivière de la Savane
  - Rivière Qui-Mène-du-Train (via le lake Ouiatchouan)
  - Lac des Commissaires
    - Rivière des Commissaires
    - Goddard River
    - Goéland River (lac des Commissaires)
  - Argent River
  - Goéland River
    - Rivière du Fouet (lac au Mirage)
    - Joseph-Louis River
  - Rivière au Français
    - Rivière à la Perche (lac des Commissaires)
  - Crespieul River
  - Ouellet River
- Ouananiche River
- Ouiatchouaniche River
- Rivière à la Chasse (lac Saint-Jean)
- Rivière aux Iroquois
  - Deuxième bras des Iroquois
- Ashuapmushuan River
  - Rivière à l'Ours (Ashuapmushuan River tributary)
    - Rivière du Castor (rivière à l'Ours)
    - Ovide River
    - Petite rivière à l'Ours (rivière à l'Ours) - South
    - Petite rivière à l'Ours (rivière à l'Ours) - West
  - Petite rivière Eusèbe
    - Rivière à la Carpe (Petite rivière Eusèbe)
  - Rivière aux Saumons (Ashuapmushuan River)
    - Rivière au Doré
      - Rivière au Doré Ouest
    - Indienne River
  - Pémonca River
    - Rivière aux Trembles
  - Rivière du Cran
  - Chigoubiche River
    - Vermillon River (Chigoubiche River tributary)
    - Rivière à la Pêche (Chigoubiche River tributary)
    - Rivière du Pilet
    - Rivière du Grand Portage
      - Grand Portage South-West River
      - Grand Portage South-East River
  - Kanishushteu River
  - River ? (via Ashuapmushuan Lake)
    - Rivière de la Licorne (via Gabriel-Fleury Lake)
  - Marquette River (via Ashuapmushuan Lake)
    - Marquette River West
  - Normandin River (via Ashuapmushuan Lake)
    - Milieu River (Normandin River) (via Poutrincourt Lake)
      - Maskoskanaw River
    - Bouteroue Creek
    - Boisvert River (Normandin River)
      - Hogan River
    - Coquille River (Normandin River)
    - Tonnerre River (Normandin River)
    - Chaudière River (Normandin River)
  - La Loche River (Ashuapmushuan River)
    - Little River of the Chef
  - Mazarin River
  - Du Chef River
    - Dobleau River
      - Hilarion River
      - Rivière des Grèves
    - L'Épervier River
    - Petite Grand-Mère River
    - Chonard River
    - Petite Meule River
    - Dorée River
    - Nestaocano River
    - West Nestaocano River
    - Crochue River
      - Azianne River
  - Brochets River (Ashuapmushuan River tributary)
  - Petite rivière aux Saumons
  - Rivière à la Loutre (Ashuapmushuan River tributary)
- Ticouapé River
- Mistassini River
  - Ouasiemsca River
    - Micosas River
      - Élizabeth River
        - Brûle-Neige River (Élizabeth River) (via lake Dufresne)
      - Ferrée River
    - Carcajou River
    - Cyprès River
    - Nistocaponano River
  - Gervais River
  - Rivière à la Truite (Mistassini River)
    - Petite rivière à la Truite (rivière à la Truite) (via "Lac à la Truite")
  - Papillon River
  - Samaqua River
  - Rivière aux Rats
    - Ruisseau du Loup-Cervier (rivière aux Rats)
      - Petite rivière aux Foins
        - Petite rivière à la Truite (Petite rivière aux Foins)
    - Perdrix Blanche River
      - Nepton River
    - Catherine River
    - Petite rivière aux Rats (rivière aux Rats)
    - Déception River (rivière aux Rats)
    - Rivière de l'Écluse (rivière aux Rats)
    - Ruisseau à la Corne
    - Rivière à la Carpe (rivière aux Rats)
  - Mistassibi River
    - Petite rivière Rousseau¸
    - Oiseaux River
    - Bureau River
    - Daniel River (Mistassibi River)
    - Mistassibi River North-East
      - Boisvert River (Mistassibi North-East River)
      - François River (rivière à François)
      - Henri River (Mistassibi North-East River)
    - Brûle-Neige River (Mistassibi River)
    - Connelly River
    - Rivière du Banc de Sable (Mistassibi River)
    - Savard River (Mistassibi River)
      - Milot Creek (Savard River)
        - Perron River
    - Rivière du Dépôt
- Péribonka River (SEE SECTION "PÉRIBONKA RIVER")
- Taillon River
- Rivière à la Pipe

==== Tributaries of Péribonka River ====
East Shore (upstream)
- Péribonka River
  - Noire River (Péribonka River)
  - Blanche River (Péribonka River) (via Tchitogama Lake)
  - Malek River
  - Canal Sec River
  - Manouane River (Péribonka River)
    - Rivière du Portage (Manouane River)
    - Alma River (Manouane River)
    - Houlière River
    - Little Manouane River
      - Duhamel River
      - Dufort River
    - Manouaniche River
    - Manouane Lake (Mont-Valin)
      - Petite rivière des Perdrix Blanches
      - Rivière des Montagnes Blanches
        - Rivière aux Perches (rivière des Montagnes Blanches)
        - Falconio River
    - Rivière à Georges
    - Castorver)
  - Rivière de l'Épinette Rouge
  - Brodeuse River
  - Serpent River (Péribonka River)
    - Étienniche River
      - D'Ailleboust River (via le D'Ailleboust Lake)
    - Rivière au Serpent South-West
      - Rivière du Sapin Croche
      - Lapointe River (rivière au Serpent South-West) (via lac du Serpent)
      - Rivière-Qui-Cale River
      - Brûlée River (rivière du Castor-Qui-Cale)
    - Naja River
    - Grand Détour River
  - Petite rivière Shipshaw
  - À la Carpe River (Péribonka River)
  - Cocoumenen River
  - Bonnard River
    - Modeste River
  - Savane River (Péribonka River tributary)
    - Courtois River
    - Rivière du Cran Cassé
    - Lerole River
    - Benoit River
      - Rivière à Michel Nord
    - Rivière à Michel (Savane River)
  - Épervanche River
  - Péribonka East River
    - Carignan River

West shore (downstream)

- Péribonka River
  - Rivière de la Grande Loutre
  - Saint-Onge River (Péribonka Rire Lapointe (rivière au Serpent Sud-Ouest) (via le lac du Serpent)
    - Ashiniu River
    - Kauashetesh River
    - Rivière des Prairies (rivière au Serpent)
    - Dumau River
      - Lekau River
  - Du Sault River (Péribonka River)
  - Louke River
  - Des Savard River
  - Rivière du Banc de Sable (Péribonka River)
  - Brûlée River (Péribonka River)
  - Bernabé River
  - Belley River (Péribonka River)
    - Little Belley River
  - Alex River (Péribonka River)
    - Milot River
    - Épiphane River
    - Des Aigles River (Alex River)
      - Manigouche River
      - Patrick River (Des Aigles River)
        - Patrick River West (via "Bleuets secs Lake")
    - Rivière des Épinettes Noires
    - Rivière du Nord (Alex river)
    - Rivière au Portage (Alex river)
  - Saint-Ludger River
  - Rivière à Michel (Péribonka River)
  - Little Péribonka River
    - Noire River (Little Péribonka River)
      - Villeneuve River
    - Doucet River (Petite rivière Péribonka)
    - Moreau River

=== North-shore tributaries downstream of Tadoussac ===
- Moulin à Baude River
  - Lapointe River (Moulin à Baude River)
- Petites Bergeronnes River
  - Lac des Sables (Petites Bergeronnes River tributary)
    - Rivière des Sables
- Grandes Bergeronnes River
  - Bas de Soie River
  - Beaulieu River
- Escoumins River
  - Cassette River
  - Polette River
  - Maclure River
  - Chatignies River
    - Boulanger River
  - Savanes River
- Moreau River
- Petits Escoumins River
- Petite Romaine River
- Sault au Mouton River
  - Castors River (Sault au Mouton River)
  - Roussel River
- Éperlan River
- La Truite River (La Haute-Côte-Nord)
- Portneuf River
  - Des Cèdres River (Portneuf River)
  - Aux Ours River (Portneuf River)
  - Jos-Ross River
  - Brûlée River (Portneuf River)
  - Portneuf River East
    - Plate River (Portneuf River East)
  - Rocheuse River (Portneuf River)
  - Noire River (Portneuf River tributary)
  - Philias River
  - Noire Little River (Portneuf River) (Petite rivière Noire)
  - Petite rivière Marguerite
- Sault aux Cochons River
  - La Loche River
  - Aux Canards River (Sault aux Cochons River)
  - La Pipe River (via Kakuskanus Lake and Sault aux Cochons Lake);
  - Isidore River
    - Isidore River West
    - Isidore River East
  - Truchon Creek
  - Nicette River
  - À la Dame River
- Laval River
  - Aux Pins River
    - Fournier River
  - Ouelette River
  - Adam River (Laval River tributary)
    - Ouelette River
    - Aux Lacs River
- Blanche River
- Colombier River

=== North-shore Betsiamites River and tributaries eastward ===
West bank
- Betsiamites River
  - Volant River
    - Virot River
  - Lessard River (Betsiamites River)
  - Leman River
  - Pipmuacan Reservoir
    - Desroches River (Betsiamites River)
    - Lionnet River (via Dubuc Lake (Lionnet River))
    - Andrieux River
    - Paul River
    - Rivière aux Sables (Pipmuacan Reservoir)
      - Eaux Mortes River (via lake au Menton)
      - Éléphant Creek
        - Rivière aux Castors (rivière aux Sables)
      - Tagi River
      - Wapishish River
      - Poulin River
      - Rivière à la Cruche (rivière aux Sables)
    - Rivière aux Chutes (réservoir Pipmuacan)
      - La Sobie River (via Lake La Sorbière)
        - La Maria River (via Rond Lake)
          - Vénus River
          - Jérémy River
          - François-Paradis River (via Maria-Chapdelaine Lake)
    - Saint-Yves River
    - Manouaniche River (via lake Melonèze)
    - De l'Épinette River
    - Pipmuacan River
      - Pipmuacan River West
    - Aux Hirondelles River
    - Sylvestre River
    - La Tourette River
    - Tokencutout River
    - Micheline River
    - Madeleine River

East bank

- Betsiamites River
  - Manouanis River (via Manouanis Lake)
  - Rivière de la Grande Charge (via Perdu Lake (Betsiamites River))
  - Rivière Pékans (via le Perdu Lake (Betsiamites River))
  - Auriac River
    - Lisette River
  - Echo River
  - Canton River
  - Praslin River
  - Dentelle River
  - Brochet River
    - Riverin River
    - Biscuits River
  - Cabituquimats River
  - Martineau River
  - Frégate River
  - Boucher River
    - Saint-Onge River
    - Portage River
  - Laliberté River
  - Nipi River
- Papinachois River
- Barthélemy River
- Aux Rosiers River
- Ragueneau River
  - Ragueneau River East

=== North-shore Aux Outardes River and tributaries eastward ===
- Rivière aux Outardes
  - Rivière à la Truite (rivière aux Outardes)
  - Rochue River
  - Loup Marin River
    - Caouishtagamac River
  - Chevalier River (Outardes River tributary)
    - Bureau River (Chevalier River)
  - Roquemont River
  - Rivière à la Croix (rivière aux Outardes tributary)
  - Bleuets River (rivière aux Outardes tributary)
  - Minauaniss River
    - Plétipi Lake
      - Boivin River (rivière aux Outardes) (via Boivin Lake (rivière aux Outardes) and Plétipi Lake)
  - Matonipi River
  - Tortueuse River
  - Outardes 4 Reservoir
    - Lapointe River (Outardes Quatre Reservoir)
    - Remous River
    - Brochet River
    - Hulot River (via Hulot Lake)
    - Blanzy River
    - Rivière à l'Argent (via lac du Coude)
      - Villéon River
      - Rivière du Grand Brûlé
    - Rivière des Chutes (rivière aux Outardes)
    - Rivière du Porc-Épic
    - Nouvel River
  - Croche River (rivière aux Outardes)
  - Desgouttes River (via Plétipi Lake)
  - Rivière des Bois (rivière aux Outardes)
  - Rivière du Bois Long
  - Antrim River
  - Georges-Tremblay River
- Saint-Athanase River West
- Saint-Athanase River (Pointe-aux-Outardes)

=== North-shore Manicouagan River and tributaries eastward ===
- Manicouagan River
  - Blanche River (rivière Manicouagan)
  - Manic Deux Reservoir
    - Landry River
  - Caouette River
  - Vallant River
    - Vallant River East
  - Gaillard River
  - Vachon River (Manicouagan River)
  - Quicaquestagane River
  - Anita River
  - Manicouagan Reservoir
    - Paradis River
    - Utiskhku River
    - Mouchalagane River
      - Tuk River
      - Marsac River
      - Labadie River
      - Pipichicau River
    - Seignelay River
      - Séchelles River
    - Racine de Bouleau River
    - Themines River
      - Petit Brochet River
    - Beaupré River
    - Hart-Jaune River
      - Blough River
    - Savard River
  - Lemay River
    - Aguenier River
  - Caopachaco River
  - Landry River
  - Toulnustouc River
    - Isoukustouc River
      - Du Chien River
      - Capaotigamau River
      - Pourroy River
      - Qu'Appelle River
    - Caribou River
    - Rocque River
    - Fontmarais River
    - Learmonth River
    - Toulnustouc North-East
    - Regis River
    - Boisvert River (Toulnustouc River)
    - Pistuacanis River
- Amédée River
  - Le Petit Bras (Amédée River tributary)
- Rivière à la Chasse (Baie-Comeau)
- Rivière aux Anglais
  - Brisson River (rivière aux Anglais)
  - Françoise River
  - Rivière des Trois Pointes
  - Tremblay River
- Amédée River
- Mistasini River (Manicouagan)
  - Baudin River
  - Georges River (Mistassini River)
- Franquelin River
  - Bouchard River
  - Rivière Franquelin Branche Ouest
    - Lessard River (rivière Franquelin Branche Ouest)
  - Ma Tante River
  - Thompson River (Franquelin River tributary)
- Saint-Nicholas River
- Godbout River
  - Godbout River East
    - Beauzèle River
  - Bignell River (Godbout River)
  - Regis River
  - Boisvert River
  - Étienne River (Godbout River)
  - Mon Oncle River
- De la Trinité River
- Pentecôte River
  - Dubé River
  - Petite Pentecôte River
    - Caotibia River
      - Du Coude River
  - Calumet River (Haute Côte-Nord)
  - Crapauds River
  - Saint-Pierre River (Pentecôte River tributary)
  - Dubé River
  - Baie River (Crapauds River)
  - Du Pont River
- Riverin River
- Îles de Mai River
- Aux Rochers River
  - Pasteur River
  - MacDonald River
  - Gravel River
  - Schmon River

=== North-shore Sainte-Marguerite River and tributaries eastward ===
- Sainte-Marguerite River
  - Valin River (Sainte-Marguerite River tributary)
  - Ferrée Rivière (Sainte-Marguerite River tributary)
  - Jean-Pierre River (Sainte-Marguerite)
  - Kausseshkau River
  - Rivière de la Montagne Blanche
- Rapides River
- Moisie River
  - Kachiwiss River
  - Ouapetec River
  - Rivière aux Pékans
    - Carhel River
    - Crasse River
  - Taoti River
  - Petite rivière Taoti
  - Joseph River
  - Rivière à l'Eau Dorée
  - Nipissis River
    - Mistamoue River (via lake Siamois)
      - Matinipi River
    - Wacouno River
    - Nipisso River
    - McDonald River
    - Petite rivière à la Truite (Moisie River tributary)
- Matamec River
- Loups Marins River
- Pigou River
  - Pigou-Est River
- Bouleau River
  - Petite rivière au Bouleau
  - Chiskal River
    - Rivière à Dupuis
- Rivière du Sault Plat
- Tortue River (Côte-Nord)
  - Petite rivière Tortue
  - Rivière aux Chutes
  - Rivière aux Îlets
- Rivière du Sault Blanc
- Ruisseau à Moïse
- Manitou River
  - Ruisseau à Marcel
  - Petite rivière Manitou
  - Rivière à la Truite (Manitou River)
- Rivière aux Graines (Minganie)
- Rivière à la Chaloupe
  - Rivière Robichaud
  - Rivière Guillaume
  - Vibert River
- Sheldrake River
- Couture River
- Jim-Hearst River
- Moyac River
- Duck River (Minganie)
- Tonnerre River (Minganie)
- Brûlée River (Minganie)
- Béline River
- Magpie River
- Magpie River East
- Saint-Cœur River
- Saint-Jean River
  - Chambers River
    - Chambers East River
  - Méo River
  - Saint-Jean North-East River
    - Matamek River
- Mingan River
  - Mitshem Kutshieu River
  - Mingan North-West River
  - Maurice River
- Kamenakapeu River

=== Tributaries downstream of Romaine River ===
- Romaine River (Newfoundland-Québec)
  - Maleck River
  - Puyjalon River
    - Bat-le-Diable River
    - Allard River (Puylalon River tributary)
    - Octave River (Puylalon Lake) (through Puyjalon Lake)
    - Perugia River (through Puyjalon Lake)
    - Au Foin River
  - Bernard River
  - Glapion River
  - Baubert River
  - Jérôme River
  - Little Romaine River
  - Touladis River
  - Rivière aux Pêcheurs
  - Rivière aux Fleurs
  - Rivière aux Brochets
  - Rivière des Cinq Lacs
  - Discharge of Lake Pommerel (Newfoundland)
  - Sénéchal River (Newfoundland)
  - Discharge of Lake Norman (Newfoundland-Quebec))
  - Sauterelles River
  - Garneau River (Romaine River)
    - Garneau River West
    - Marthe River
  - Abbé Huard River
  - Romaine River Southwest
- Aisley River
- Little River (Minganie) (French: "La Petite Rivière (Minganie)")
- Grande River (Minganie) (French: "La Grande Rivière (Minganie)")
- Joachim River (French: "Rivière à Joachim")
- Coco River (Minganie)
- North-West River
- Jos River (French: "Rivière à Jos")
- Rivière à l'Ours (Minganie)
  - Rivière à l'Ours Ouest
- Du Milieu River (Minganie)
- De La Corneille River (Minganie)
- Piashti River
- Quetachou River
  - Bellanger River
  - Plate River (Quetachou River)
- Véronique River
- Watshishou River
  - Pashashibou River
- Little Watshishou River
- Pashashibou River
- Little Du Milieu River
- Little River East
- Nabisipi River
  - Michaud River (Minganie)
- Aguanish River
  - Dany River
  - Leguyader River
  - Aguanish River North
    - Aguanish River Northwest
  - Ludger River
- Rivière de l'Île Michon
- Uahtauakau River
- Plaines River
- Little Natashquan River

=== Tributaries downstream of Natashquan River ===
- Natashquan River (Newfoundland-Quebec)
  - Lapierre River
  - Mercereau River (Newfoundland-Quebec)
  - Lejemtel River
  - Kachekaosipou River (Newfoundland-Quebec)
  - Mistanipisipou River (Newfoundland-Quebec)
  - Maheunipiu River (Newfoundland-Quebec)
  - Natashquan River East (Newfoundland-Quebec)
    - Mehkunutshuax River
  - Natashquan River West
    - Kaminaxtuutam River
  - Akaku River
- Longue River
- Clay River
- Sam River
- Kegaska River
- Petite rivière Kegaska
- Belley River
- Rivière de l'Anse Muddy
- River ?
- Musquaro River
  - Dutro River
- Musquanousse River
- Washicoutai River
- Olomane River (Terre-Neuve-Quebec)
- Coacoachou River
- Étamamiou River
- Rivière à la Croix (Côte-Nord-du-Golfe-du-Saint-Laurent)
- Nétagamiou River
- Petit Mécatina River (Terre-Neuve-Quebec)
  - Porc-Épic River
  - Mongeau River
  - Joir River (Terre-Neuve-Québec)
- Gros Mécatina River
- Véco River
  - Ha! Ha! River (Gros-Mécatina)
- Kécarpoui River
- Pagachou River
- Saint-Augustin River (Newfoundland-Quebec)
  - Rivière Saint-Augustin Nord-Ouest (Newfoundland-Quebec)
    - Discharge of lake Wapustagamau
      - Rivière à Saumon (via Wapustagamau Lake)
    - Thunay River
  - La Mouche River (Newfoundland-Quebec)
  - Matse River (Newfoundland)
  - Michaels River (Newfoundland)
- Coxipi River
- Chécatica River
- Napetipi River (Newfoundland-Quebec)
- Saint-Paul River (Newfoundland-Quebec)
  - Bujeault River (Newfoundland-Quebec)
  - Joswi River
- Salmon Bay River
- Belles Amours River
- Eagle Head River
- Brador River (Newfoundland-Quebec)
  - Brador River East (Newfoundland-Quebec)
- Blanc Sablon River (Newfoundland-Quebec)

=== Islands of Saint Lawrence River ===
==== Salaberry-de-Valleyfield ====
- Saint Charles River (Valleyfield)

==== Orleans Island ====
- Chenal des Grands Voiliers
- Rivière du Moulin (Saint-Laurent-de-l'Île d'Orléans)
- Maheu River
- Lafleur River
- Dauphine River
- Rivière de la Savane (île d'Orléans)
- Ruisseau du Moulin (île d'Orléans)
- Rivière Pot au Beurre (île d'Orléans)
- Rivière du Moulin (Saint-Pierre-de-l'Île-d'Orléans)
- Chenal de l'Île d'Orléans

==== Anticosti Island ====
South shore of Anticosti Island (from west to east)
- Plantain River
- Gamache River (Anticosti Island)
- Trois Milles River
- Rivière aux Canards (Anticosti Island)
- La Petite Rivière (Anticosti Island - Western part)
- Rivière aux Graines (Anticosti Island)
- Bec-Scie River
- Sainte-Marie River (Anticosti Island)
- Rivière aux Cailloux
- Sainte Anne River (Anticosti Island)
- Rivière à la Loutre (L'Île-d'Anticosti)
- Rivière au Fusil
- Jupiter River
- Rivière à la Chute (Anticosti Island)
- Rivière du Brick
- Galiote River
- Rivière aux Rats (Anticosti Island)
- Chicotte River
- Rivière aux Plats
- Pavillon River
  - Pavillon East River
- Ferrée River (Anticosti Island)
- Maccan River (Anticosti Island)
- Bilodeau River
- Little Chaloupe River
- Chaloupe River
- Dauphiné River
- Bell River (Anticosti Island)
- Petite rivière de la Loutre
- Loups Marins River (Anticosti Island)
- Cormoran River
- La Petite Rivière (Anticosti Island - Eastern part)

North shore of Anticosti Island (from west to east)

- Huile River
- Patatte River
- Observation River
- Vauréal River
- Des Petits Jardins River
- Rivière de l'Ours
- Natiscotec River
- Métallique River
- Rivière aux Saumons (Anticosti Island)
- Schmitt River
- Prinsta River
- Renard River (Anticosti Island)

== Watershed of south shore of St. Lawrence River (between Ontario border and Etchemin River) ==
=== Watershed of Haut-Saint-Laurent ===
- St. Regis River, New York and Quebec (United States, Canada)
- Beauharnois Canal
- La Guerre River
- Saint-Louis River
- Châteauguay River (United States, Canada)
  - Rivière des Fèves
  - English River (Chateauguay River tributary) (United States, Canada)
    - Noire River (English River tributary)
  - Rivière aux Outardes (Chateauguay River)
    - Rivière aux Outardes Est
  - Trout River (Chateauguay River tributary) (United States, Canada)
    - Little Trout River (New York) (United States)
  - Rivière de l'Esturgeon (Châteauguay River)
    - Noire River (rivière de l'Esturgeon)
  - Hinchinbrooke River (United States, Canada)
- Saint-Régis River (Roussillon)
  - Saint-Pierre River
- Rivière à la Tortue
- Saint-Jacques River
- Sabrevois River
- Rivière aux Pins (Boucherville)
- Saint-Charles River (Varennes)

=== Watershed of Richelieu River ===
- Richelieu River (United States and Canada)
  - Lacolle River
  - Rivière du Sud (Richelieu River tributary)
  - Amyot River
  - Acadia River (United States and Canada)
  - Rivière des Hurons (Richelieu River tributary)
  - Rivière des Iroquois (Richelieu River tributary)
  - Bernier River (Richelieu River tributary)
  - Champlain Lake (United States and Canada)
    - Pike River (Missisquoi Bay tributary) (United States and Canada)
      - North Pike River (Pike River)
    - Rock River (Lake Champlain) (United States and Canada) (named "Rivière de la Roche" in Quebec)
    - Missisquoi River (United States and Canada)
      - Sutton River (Missisquoi River tributary) (United States and Canada)
      - Brock River (Missisquoi River) (Canada)
      - Missisquoi River North
        - Petite rivière Missisquoi Nord
      - East Branch Missisquoi River (United States)
      - Burgess Branch (United States)
      - Trout River (Vermont) (United States)

=== Watershed of Yamaska River ===
- Yamaska River
  - Rivière Pot au Beurre (Yamaska River tributary)
    - Petite rivière Pot au Beurre
    - Bellevue River
    - Lemoine River
      - Petite rivière Bellevue
  - Le Petit Chenail (Yamaska River tributary)
    - Saint-Louis River (Yamaska River tributary)
  - Salvail River
  - Rivière du Sud-Ouest (Yamaska River tributary)
  - Écossais River
  - Yamaska South East River
  - North Yamaska River
  - Noire River (Yamaska River tributary)
    - Rivière le Renne
      - Duncan River (rivière le Renne tributary)
    - Jaune River (Noire River tributary)
    - Rouge River (Noire River tributary)
  - Chibouet River
  - David River (Yamaska River tributary)

=== Watershed of Saint-François River and Eastern tributaries ===
West bank of Saint-François River

Saint-François River

- Rivière aux Vaches
- Petite rivière Noire (Saint-François River tributary)
- Saint-Germain River
- Ulverton River
- Magog River
  - Lake Memphremagog
    - Johns River (Vermont) (Vermont, United States)
    - Cherry River (Quebec) (Québec, Canada)
    - Black River (Lake Memphremagog) (Vermont, United States)
    - Barton River, Vermont (Vermont, United States)
      - Willoughby River (Vermont, United States)
        - Brownington Branch (Willoughby River tributary) (Vermont, United States)
    - Clyde River (Vermont) (Vermont, United States)
      - Pherrins River, Vermont (Vermont, United States)

South bank of Saint-François River

- Massawippi River
  - Coaticook River
  - Rivière aux Saumons (Massawippi River tributary)
    - Moe River (rivière aux Saumons tributary)
  - Lake Massawippi
    - Tomifobia River
      - Niger River (Tomifobia River tributary)
- Eaton River
  - Clifton River
  - North Eaton River
    - Rivière du Sud (North Eaton River tributary)
    - Newport River (North Eaton River tributary)
- Rivière au Saumon (Le Haut-Saint-François)
  - Rouge River (rivière au Saumon)
  - Chesham River
  - Ditton River
    - Ditton West River
    - Ditton East River
- Rivière au Rat (Weedon)
- Bernier River (Saint-François River tributary)

North bank of Saint-François River

- Moose River
- Coulombe River
  - Coulombe North River
- Rivière au Canard (Haut Saint-François)
- Weedon Stream
- Rivière de la Bogue

Grand lac Saint François

- Felton River
  - Sauvage River (Felton River tributary)
  - Noire River (Felton River tributary)
  - Blanche River (Felton River tributary)
  - Legendre River
- La Petite Rivière (Grand lac Saint François)
- Blueberries River (Grand lac Saint François)
  - Rivière aux Bluets Sud
- Petite rivière Muskrat
- Muskrat River
  - Rivière du Nord (Muskrat River) (via Bolduc lake)
- Rivière de l'Or
- Ashberham River

Lake Noir (Saint-François River)

- Bisby River
- Coleraine River

East bank of Saint-François River

- Watopeka River
  - Stoke River

Tributaries downstream of Saint-François River' mouth

- Lévesque River
- Colbert River
- Landroche River
- Rivière des Frères

=== Watershed of Nicolet River and Eastern tributaries ===
- Nicolet River
  - Nicolet Southwest River
    - Saint-Zéphirin River
    - Sévère-René River
    - Landry River (Nicolet Southwest River tributary)
      - Danville River
    - Carmel River (Nicolet Southwest River)
    - Lafont River
    - Pat River
    - Petite rivière à Monfette
    - Nicolet Centre River
      - Nicolet North-East River
    - Dion River (Nicolet Southwest River tributary)
    - Saint-Camille Brook
      - Madeleine River (Saint-Camille Brook tributary)
  - Bulstrode River
    - Blanche River (Bulstrode River tributary)
    - Noire River (Bulstrode River tributary)
    - L'Abbé River (Bulstrode River tributary)
  - Gosselin River (Nicolet River tributary)
    - Lachance River (Gosselin River tributary)
  - Rivière des Rosiers
  - Rivière des Pins (Nicolet River tributary)
  - Brooks River
  - Dumont River (Nicolet River tributary)
  - Blanche River (Nicolet River tributary)
  - Rivière des Vases (Nicolet River tributary)
- Godefroy River
  - Gagnon River (Godefroy River tributary)

=== Watershed of Bécancour River and Eastern tributaries ===
- Bécancour River
  - Judith River (Bécancour River tributary)
  - Blanche River (Bécancour River tributary)
  - Portage River (Bécancour River tributary)
  - Goulet River (Bécancour River tributary)
  - Bourbon River
    - Blanche River (Bourbon River tributary)
  - Noire River (Bécancour River tributary)
    - Barbue River
    - Perdrix River (Bécancour River tributary)
  - Palmer River (Bécancour River tributary)
    - Osgood River
      - Sunday River (Osgood River tributary)
      - Gagné River
    - Palmer East River
    - Perry River (Palmer River tributary)
    - Whetstone River (Palmer River tributary)
  - McKenzie River (Bécancour River tributary)
  - Dubois River (named in the past "Chainey River")
  - Bagot River
  - Fortier River (Bécancour River tributary)
  - Larochelle River
  - Rivière au Pin (Bécancour River tributary)
    - Blanche River (rivière au Pin tributary)
  - Blanche River (Thetford Mines)
  - Rivière du Moulin (Bécancour River tributary)

=== Watershed of Gentilly River and Eastern tributaries ===
- Gentilly River (Quebec)
  - Gentilly South-West River
    - Grand-Saint-Louis River
  - Sauvage River
  - Beaudet River
- Rivière de la Ferme
- Rivière du Moulin (Gentilly)
- Rivière aux Glaises
- Rivière aux Orignaux (Gentilly)
- Petite rivière du Chêne
  - Rivière aux Ormes (Petite rivière du Chêne)
  - Creuse River (Petite rivière du Chêne)
- Rivière du Chêne (Leclercville)
  - Rivière aux Chevreuils
  - Saint-Georges River (rivière du Chêne tributary)
  - Huron River (rivière du Chêne tributary)
    - Rivière aux Ormes (Huron River tributary)
    - Noire River (Huron River tributary)
  - Henri River (Lotbinière)
    - Rivière aux Cèdres
    - Rivière aux Frênes
  - Rivière du Bois Clair
- Aulneuse River

=== Watershed of Chaudière River ===
Tributaries of west bank of Richelieu River

- Chaudière River
  - Beaurivage River
    - Rouge River (Beaurivage River tributary)
    - Noire River (Beaurivage River tributary)
    - Rivière aux Pins (Beaurivage River tributary)
    - Filkars River
      - Armagh River
      - Saint-André River
      - Fourchette River
    - Bras d'Henri
    - Cugnet River
  - Rivière des Îles Brûlées
  - Vallée River
  - Savoie River
  - Nadeau River (Chaudière River tributary)
  - Lessard River (Chaudière River tributary)
  - Cliche River
  - Rivière des Fermes
  - Bras Saint-Victor
    - Rivière du Cinq
    - Prévost-Gilbert River
      - Noire River (Prévost-Gilbert River tributary)
    - Rivière des Hamel
  - Rivière du Moulin (Beauceville)
    - Noire River (rivière du Moulin tributary)
    - Ruisseau des Meules (rivière du Moulin tributary)
  - Pozer River
  - Shenley River
  - Rivière de la Grande Coudée
  - Rivière du Petit Portage
  - Ludgine River
  - Drolet River
  - Madisson River
  - Glen River (Chaudière River tributary)
  - Lake Mégantic
    - Victoria River (lake Mégantic)
    - Bergeron River
    - Rivière aux Araignées
      - Rivière des Indiens (lac aux Araignées)
      - Arnold River (lac aux Araignées)
        - Clinton River (Arnold River tributary)
        - Ruisseau Saint-Joseph

Tributaries of east bank of Chaudière River

- Nebnellis River
  - Kokombis River
- Samson River (Chaudière River tributary)
  - Rivière du Barrage
    - Rivière des Renards
- Rivière du Moulin (Chaudière River tributary)
- Rivière à la Truite (Chaudière River tributary)
- Rivière du Loup (Chaudière River tributary)
  - Taschereau River (rivière du Loup tributary)
  - Caouette Stream
  - Rivière du Monument
    - Petite rivière du Monument
  - Rivière du Portage (rivière du Loup)
    - rivière du Portage Nord
  - Wilson River (rivière du Loup tributary)
  - Metgermette River
    - Metgermette River South
    - Metgermette River Centrale
    - Metgermette River North
  - Vachon River (rivière du Loup tributary)
- Famine River
  - Abénaquis River
    - Abénaquis River South-West
    - Abénaquis River South-East
  - Veilleux River
  - Raquette River (Famine River tributary)
  - Flamand River (Les Etchemins)
  - Cumberland River (Québec)
- Gilbert River (Beauce-Sartigan)
- Plante River
  - Fraser River (Plante River tributary)
    - Noire River (Fraser River tributary)
- Calway River
- Pouliot River
- Morency River
- Belair River
  - Binet River
- Chassé River
  - Domaine River

=== Watershed of Etchemin River ===
Tributaries of west bank:
- Penin River
- Le Bras
- Desbarats River
- Pyke River
- Henderson River
- Viveine River

Tributaries of south bank:

- Lanigan River
- Discharge of lake Etchemin
- Etchemin Little River
- Bourget River

Tributaries of east bank:

- Blanche River
- Bœuf River
- Fleurs River
- Eau Chaude Stream
  - Rover Stream
- Hemison Stream
- Abénaquis River
  - Billots River
    - Moulin River

== Gaspesie Peninsula ==
=== Watershed of southeast of St. Lawrence River (at east of Etchemin River) ===
- Rivière à la Scie
  - Couture River
- Boyer River (Bellechasse)
  - Boyer River North
  - Boyer South River
- Rivière des Mères
  - Blanche River
- Rivière à Lacaille

=== Watershed of South River, Montmagny (French: Rivière du Sud) ===
- Rivière du Sud (Montmagny)
  - Bras Saint-Michel
    - Rivière du Moulin (Bras Saint-Michel)
  - Rivière de la Fourche (rivière du Sud tributary)
    - Rivière des Mornes
    - Rivière des Orignaux (rivière de la Fourche tributary)
  - Rivière du Pin (rivière du Sud tributary)
    - Gabriel River
      - North River (Gabriel River tributary)
  - Rivière à la Loutre (rivière du Sud tributary)
  - Alick River
    - Rivière du Moulin (Alick River tributary)
  - Fraser River (rivière du Sud tributary)
  - Little Sainte-Marguerite River
  - Minguy River
  - Morigeau River
    - Rivière des Poitras
  - Bras Saint-Nicolas
    - Rivière des Perdrix (Bras Saint-Nicolas)
      - Inconnue River (rivière des Perdrix tributary)
    - Cloutier River
    - Bras d'Apic
    - Bras de Riche
      - Bras du Nord-Est (Bras de Riche)
    - Méchant Pouce River

=== Watershed of southeast bank of St. Lawrence River (at east of South River, Montmagny) ===
- Vincelotte River
- Tortue River (L'Islet)
  - Tortue South-West River
    - Rivière du Petit Moulin
- Trois Saumons River
  - Trois Saumons East River
- Port Joli River
  - Pinguet River
- Ferrée River (L'Islet)
  - Le Bras (Ferrée River tributary)
  - Joncas River (Ferrée River tributary)
- Saint-Jean River (La Pocatière)
- Ouelle River
  - Damnée River
  - Grande Rivière (Ouelle River tributary)
    - Chaude River (Grande Rivière tributary)
    - Sainte-Anne River (Grande Rivière tributary)
    - Rivière du Rat Musqué
  - Bras de la rivière Ouelle
- Kamouraska River (ex-rivière aux Perles)
  - Dufour River
  - Saint-Denis River (Kamouraska River tributary)
    - Bras de la Rivière Saint-Denis
  - Goudron River
- Fouquette River
- Rivière des Caps

=== Watershed of Rivière du Loup and Eastern tributaries ===
- Rivière du Loup
  - Pivard River
  - Le Grand Bras
  - Manie River
  - Loutres River
  - Fourchue River
    - Carrier River
    - Rocheuse River
      - Noire River
  - Little Black River
  - Little River du Loup
  - Little River du Loup
- Vases River
- Verte River
  - Roches River
  - Cacouna River
  - Fourche River
- Girard River
- Petit Sault River
- Pointe à la Loupe River

=== Watershed of Trois-Pistoles River and Eastern tributaries ===
- Trois Pistoles River
  - Gamelle River
  - Plainasse River
  - Mariakèche River
    - Chaud Stream
  - Sénescoupé River
    - Lake of Grande Fourche
      - Saint-Hubert River
  - Toupiké River
    - Plate River
  - Boisbouscache River
    - Sapins River
      - Ferrée River
    - Bouleaux River
    - Perdrix River
    - La Franchise River
    - Abraham-Bell River
    - Abraham River
  - Sauvagesse River
- Renouf River
  - Deschênes River
- Harton River
- Centrale River
  - Little River North of Mountain
- Porc-Pic River
- River South-West
  - Neigette River
- Bic River
  - Aulnes River
  - Gamache River
- Hâtée River
  - Branche de la rivière Hâtée

=== Watershed of Rimouski River and Eastern tributaries ===
- Rimouski River
West bank (from confluence)
- Rigoumabe River
- Little Rimouski River
  - Rivière des Accores
  - Rivière Plate (Flat River (Little Rimouski River))
- Noire River
- Blanche River
- Little Touradi River
- France River
- Boucher River
- Grand Touradi River
  - Brisson River (rivière du Grand Touradi tributary)
  - Cennelier River

East bank (from upper part)

- Brûlé River
- Bois Brûlé River
- Macpès River
- Chat River
- Ferrée River (Ferré Lake)
- Brisson River (Rimouski River tributary)
- East Rimouski River

=== Watershed of La Mitis and Eastern tributaries ===
- Mitis River
  - Neigette River
    - Little Neigette River
      - Lunettes River
    - Rouge River
    - Paquet River
    - Noire River
  - Mistigougèche River
    - Ferrée River
    - Armand-Lelièvre River
  - Mercier River
  - Saint-Pierre River
  - Rouge River
- Tartigou River
- Blanche River
  - Alex River (Blanche River)
  - South Blanche River
- Little Blanche River
- Matane River
  - Petchedetz River
    - East Petchedetz River
      - South Petchedetz River
  - Towagodi River
  - Tamagodi River
  - Rivière à la Truite (Troot River)
    - Petite Rivière à la Truite (Little Troot River)
  - Rivière Bonjour
  - Duvivier River
  - Little Matane River

=== Northern slope of Gaspésie ===
- Pierre River
- Rivière des Grands Méchins (Grand Mechins River)
  - Rivière des Grands Méchins Ouest (West Grand Mechins River)
- Rivière des Grands Capucins (Grand Capucins River)
- Cap-Chat River
  - Little Cap-Chat River
    - Petite Rivière Cap-Chat Est (East Little Cap-Chat River)
  - Rivière Cap-Chat Est (East Cap-Chat River)
- Sainte-Anne River
  - North-East Sainte-Anne River
- Little Sainte-Anne River
- Rivière à la Martre
  - Rivière à la Martre Ouest
- Marsoui River
  - East Marsoui River
- Claude River
- Mont-Saint-Pierre River
  - East Branch
- Mont-Louis River
  - West Mont-Louis River
- Anse Pleureuse River
- Gros-Morne River
- Manche d'Épée River
- Little River Madeleine
- Madeleine River
  - South Madeleine River
  - North Madeleine River
  - Béland River
  - Diable River
  - Rivière à l'Eau Claire (Clearwater River (Madeleine River)
- Grande Vallée River
- Petite Vallée River
- Grand-Cloridorme River
- Petit-Cloridorme River
- Petite Rivière au Renard (Little Fox River)
- Rivière au Renard (Fox River (Gaspé))
  - Morris River
  - Division River
- Rivière de l'Anse au Griffon (Griffon Cove River)

=== Watershed of Gaspé Bay ===
- Dartmouth River
  - Little Fork River
- York River
  - Mississippi River
  - West Mississippi River
  - La Petite Fourche (Little Fork)
  - La Grande Fourche (Grand Fork)
- Saint-Jean River
  - South Saint-Jean River
  - West Saint-Jean River
- Seal Cove River
- Rivière de l'Anse à Brillant (Brillant Cove River)

=== Watershed of La Malbaie River (Percé) ===
- Malbaie River
  - La Petite Fourche
  - La Grande Fourche
- Beattie River
- Portage River
- Murphy River

=== Watershed of Chaleur Bay (east of Bonaventure River) ===
- Anse à Beaufils River
- Brèche à Manon River
- Grande Rivière
  - Gagnon River
  - Grande Rivière Est
    - Nadeau River
  - Grande Rivière Nord
  - Grande Rivière Ouest
- Petit Pabos River
- Grand Pabos River
  - Sèche River
  - South Great Pabos River
- Grand Pabos West River
- Anse aux Canards River
- Anse à la Barbe River
- Port-Daniel River
- Port-Daniel du Milieu River
- Little Port-Daniel River
- Shigawake River
- Saint-Godefroi River
  - Eusebe River
- Paspebiac River

=== Watershed of Chaleur Bay (west of Bonaventure River) ===
- Bonaventure River
  - Hall River
    - West Hall River
  - Duval River
  - Garin River
  - Reboul River
    - North Reboul River
  - West Bonaventure River
  - La Petite Ouest
- Saint-Siméon River
- Caplan River
- Little Cascapédia River
  - Nouvelle River
  - Little East Cascapédia River
  - Little West Cascapédia River
  - Rivière à l'Oie
- Cascapédia River
  - Ruisseau aux Saumons
  - Rivière Branche du Lac
  - Square Forks River
  - Angers River
    - Ruisseau Grand Nord
    - South Angers River
- Green River
- Stewart River
  - East Stewart River
- Nouvelle River
  - Little Nouvelle River

=== Restigouche River watershed (left bank – part in Quebec) ===
- Restigouche River
  - Escuminac River
    - Escuminac North River, Quebec
  - Rivière du Loup
  - Kempt River
    - East Kempt River
      - North Kempt River
    - West Kempt River
  - Matapedia River
    - Assemetquagan River
      - East Assemetquagan River
      - West Assemetquagan River
    - Causapscal River
      - South Causapscal River
    - Sableuse River
      - Inconnue River
    - Sayabec River
    - Saint-Pierre River
      - Melucq River
    - Tobégote River
    - Humqui River
    - Matalik River
    - Milnikek River
      - Grande Rivière Milnikek Nord
      - Vaseuse Rivere
    - Rivière du Moulin
  - Patapédia River
    - Meadow River
    - East Patapédia River

=== Restigouche River watershed (part in New Brunswick) ===
Right bank
- Upsalquitch River
  - Popelogan River
  - Southeast Upsalquitch River
    - Little Southeast Upsalquitch River
  - Northwest Upsalquitch River
- Little Main Restigouche River
  - Gounamitz River
    - North Branch Gounamitz River
    - West Branch Gounamitz River

Left bank

- Kedgwick River
  - Belle Kedgwick River
  - South Branch Kedgwick River

== Watershed of Bay of Fundy (Atlantic Ocean) ==
=== Saint John River watershed – higher part (Quebec, Maine and New Brunswick) ===
North bank of Saint John River

- Southwest Branch Saint John River, Quebec and Maine
- Northwest Branch Saint John River, Maine
  - Daaquam River, Quebec and Maine
    - Roche River, Quebec
      - Onze River, Quebec
      - Douze River, Quebec
    - Black River, Quebec
      - Little River, Quebec
      - Castors River, Quebec
      - White River, Quebec
      - Orignaux River, Quebec
    - Shidgel River, Quebec
  - Otter River, Quebec and Maine
  - Northwest Black River (flowing through Frontier Lake), Quebec
    - Little Black River, Quebec
    - Cèdres River, Quebec
    - Devost River, Quebec
    - Gauthier River, Quebec
      - Little Northwest, Quebec
    - Leverrier River, Quebec
  - Big Black River, Maine (named "Grande rivière Noire" in Quebec)
    - Depot River, Maine
      - Brown River, Quebec and Maine
    - Northeast Grand River, Quebec
      - Little William River, Quebec
      - William River, Quebec
    - Rocheuse River, Quebec
    - Buckley River, Quebec
    - Ratsoul River, Quebec
      - Tenturette River, Quebec
    - Grand Calder River, Quebec
      - Savane River, Quebec
    - Truite River, Quebec
    - Gobeil River, Quebec and Maine
    - Saint-Roch River in Quebec and Shields Branch in Maine
      - Gagnon River, Quebec
      - North Saint Roch River, Quebec
        - West Saint Roch River, Quebec
      - Rochu River, Quebec (named Petite rivière Saint-Roch in Maine)
    - Cinq Milles River (or "Fivemile Brook" in Maine)
    - Deux Milles River (or "Twomile Brook" Maine)
  - Chimenticook River, Maine
    - Eastern Lake, Quebec and Maine
      - Pointes River, Quebec
  - Pocwock River, Quebec and Maine
    - West Branch Pocwock Stream, Quebec and Maine
    - East Branch Pocwock Stream, Maine
- Little Black River (named "Little Black River" in Maine), Quebec and Maine
  - West Branch Little Black River tributary)
  - Campbell Branch Little Black River, Quebec and Maine
- St. Francis River (French: rivière Saint-François), Quebec and Maine
  - Lake Pohenegamook, Quebec
    - Boucanée River, Quebec
  - Blue River, Quebec
    - Little Blue River, Quebec
      - Southwest Blue River, Quebec
      - Prairies River, Quebec
- Crocs River, Quebec and New Brunswick
- Baker-Brook River
  - Branche à Jerry, Quebec and New Brunswick
  - Baker River North
- Madawaska River, Quebec and New Brunswick (see next section)
- Iroquois River, Quebec and New Brunswick

=== Saint John River – watershed of Madawaska River – Quebec and New Brunswick ===
- Madawaska River, Quebec and New Brunswick
  - Truite River, Quebec and New Brunswick
    - Little Truite River (Truite River), Madawaska County, New Brunswick
  - Perches River (Madawaska River), Quebec
    - Sapins River, Quebec
  - Creuse River, Quebec
  - Cabano River, Quebec
  - Little Savane River, Quebec
  - Caldwell River, Quebec
    - Lachaine River, Quebec
    - Savane River, Quebec
  - Ashberish River, Quebec
  - Touladi River, Quebec
    - Aigles River, Quebec
      - Sisime des Aigles River, Quebec
    - Orient River, Quebec
      - Verte River, Quebec
    - Squatec River, Quebec
      - Owen River, Quebec
  - Bouleaux River, Quebec

== Connecticut River – Quebec and New Hampshire ==
- Connecticut River, New Hampshire
  - Halls Stream, Quebec and New Hampshire

== See also ==
- List of rivers of Canada
- List of Hudson Bay rivers
- List of rivers and water bodies of Montreal Island
- List of Quebec Water Channels
