= False River =

False River may refer to:

- False River (California)
- False River (Louisiana)
- False River (Quebec)
