= Landry River =

Landry River may refer to:

- Landry River (Manic Deux Reservoir tributary), MRC Manicouagan, Côte-Nord, Quebec, Canada
- Landry River (Nicolet Southwest River tributary), in Estrie, in Quebec, in Canada.
