= Millette =

Millette may refer to:

== People with the surname ==
- Charles Hus, dit Millet (1738–1802), political figure in Lower Canada
- Charlotte Robillard-Millette (born 1999), Canadian professional tennis player
- Jacynthe Millette-Bilodeau (born 1979), Canadian pop singer
- Jean-Louis Millette (1935–1999), French-speaking actor and screenwriter
- Joe Millette (born 1965), former shortstop in Major League Baseball
- Leroy F. Millette, Jr. (born 1949), justice of the Supreme Court of Virginia
- Maya Millete (born 1981), American woman who went missing in 2021
- Robert E. Millette, Ambassador of Grenada to the United Nations from 1995 to 1998
- Robert Millette (born 1961), former player and coach of ice hockey for Diables Noirs de Tours

== Other uses ==
- Millette Alexander (born 1933), American concert actress and pianist
- Millette River, a tributary of the Saint Lawrence River in Trois-Rivières, Mauricie, Quebec, Canada

== See also ==
- Millet
