= Petite rivière du Monument =

River in Quebec, Canada

- Location within Quebec

Location
- Country: Canada
- Province: Quebec
- Region: Chaudière-Appalaches
- MRC: Beauce-Sartigan Regional County Municipality

Physical characteristics
- Source: Mountain stream located near the border of Maine (United States)
  - location: Saint-Théophile
  - coordinates: 45.813956°N 70.452119°W
  - elevation: 477 metres (1,565 ft)
- Mouth: Rivière du Monument
  - location: Saint-Théophile
  - coordinates: 45.85528°N 70.45139°W
  - elevation: 377 metres (1,237 ft)
- Length: 5.5 kilometres (3.4 mi)

Basin features
- Progression: Rivière du Monument, Rivière du Loup, Chaudière River, St. Lawrence River
- River system: St. Lawrence River
- Tributaries
  - left: (upstream)
  - right: (upstream)

The Petite rivière du Monument (in English: little rivere of Monument) flows in the municipality of Saint-Théophile, in the Beauce-Sartigan Regional County Municipality, in the administrative region of Chaudière-Appalaches, in Quebec, in Canada.

== Toponymy ==
The toponym "Petite rivière du Monument" was made official on December 5, 1968, at the Commission de toponymie du Québec.

== See also ==
- List of rivers of Quebec
