= Rivière à la Truite =

River in Chaudière-Appalaches, Quebec

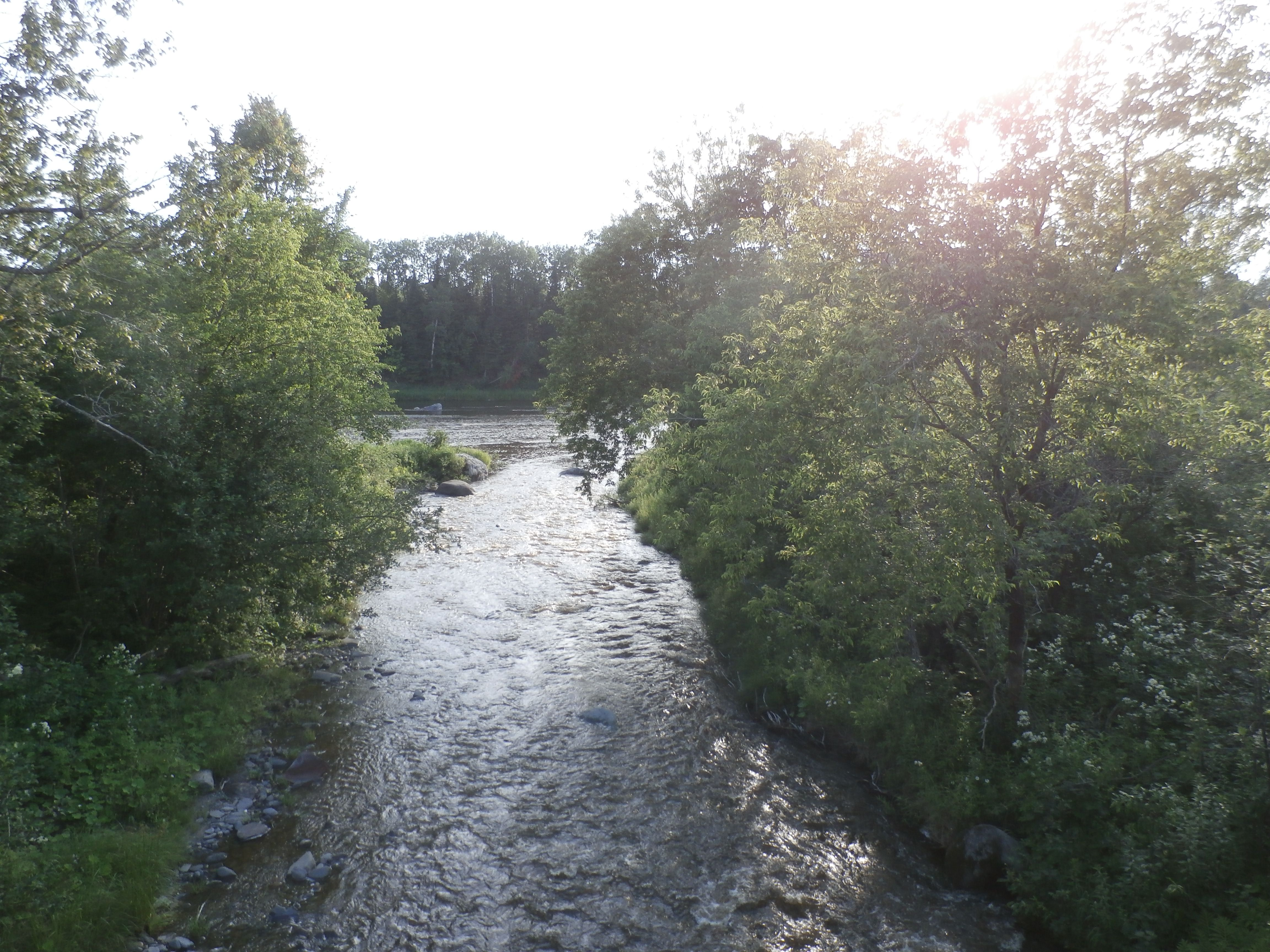
- Rivière à la Truite at its confluence with the Chaudière River.

- Location within Quebec

Location
- Country: Canada
- Province: Quebec
- Region: Chaudière-Appalaches
- MRC: Beauce-Sartigan Regional County Municipality

Physical characteristics
- Source: Agricultural streams
  - location: Saint-René
  - coordinates: 45.958151°N 70.556152°W
  - elevation: 407 metres (1,335 ft)
- Mouth: Chaudière River
  - location: Saint-Martin
  - coordinates: 45.90055°N 70.63416°W
  - elevation: 235 metres (771 ft)
- Length: 12.0 kilometres (7.5 mi)
- Basin size: 47.9 kilometres (29.76 mi)

Basin features
- Progression: Chaudière River, St. Lawrence River
- River system: St. Lawrence River
- Tributaries
  - left: (upstream) Petite rivière à la Truite, ruisseau Fortier
  - right: (upstream) ruisseau Jos-Cliche, ruisseau Blais

The rivière à la Truite (in English: Trout river) is a tributary of the east bank of the Chaudière River, which flows northward to empty on the south bank of the St. Lawrence River.

== Toponymy ==
The toponym “rivière à la Truite” was made official on December 5, 1968, at the Commission de toponymie du Québec.

== See also ==
- List of rivers of Quebec
