= La Vieille Rivière =

River in Charlevoix Regional County Municipality, Quebec, Canada

La Vieille Rivière Old name: "Ruisseau du Moulin à Scie" (Creek of Saw Mill)
- Location within Quebec

Location
- Country: Canada
- Province: Quebec
- Region: Capitale-Nationale
- Regional County Municipality: Charlevoix Regional County Municipality
- Municipality: Petite-Rivière-Saint-François

Physical characteristics
- Source: Little lake in mountain
  - location: Petite-Rivière-Saint-François
  - coordinates: 47°22′58″N 70°33′18″W
  - elevation: 409 m
- Mouth: Saint Lawrence River
  - location: Petite-Rivière-Saint-François
  - coordinates: 47°21′11″N 70°31′53″W
  - elevation: 4 m
- Length: 4.2 km (2.6 mi)

La Vieille Rivière is a tributary of the northwest shore of the St. Lawrence River. This river flows in the municipality of Petite-Rivière-Saint-François, in the regional county municipality (MRC) of Charlevoix Regional County Municipality, in the region Capitale-Nationale, in the province of Quebec, in Canada.

The course of this small mountain river descends through a residential area between Mont Gabrielle-Roy and the St. Lawrence River. The economic activities of this valley are concentrated on accommodation for the purpose of recreotourism activities, notably the important alpine ski center of the "Massif de Charlevoix" which is located very close to the south side.

The surface of the Old River is generally frozen from the beginning of December until the end of March, except for the eddy areas; however, safe traffic on the ice is generally from mid-December to mid-March. The water level of the river varies with the seasons and the precipitation; the spring flood occurs in March or April.

== Geography ==
The Vieille Rivière rises at the mouth of an unidentified small lake (length: 0.19 kilometres (0.12 mi); altitude: 409 metres (1,342 ft)). This source is hosted between three mountain peaks: a summit (altitude: 500 metres (1,600 ft)) at 1.9 kilometres (1.2 mi) on the north side; the mountain "La Pointue" (altitude: 630 metres (2,070 ft)) at 1.3 kilometres (0.81 mi) on the east side; the Mont Gabrielle-Roy (altitude: 710 metres (2,330 ft)) at 1.9 kilometres (1.2 mi) on the southwest side. This source is located at:

- 1.8 kilometres (1.1 mi) south-east of route 138 which is 5 to 6 kilometers away from the shore of the St. Lawrence River in this zone;
- 8.4 kilometres (5.2 mi) north-west of the village center of Petite-Rivière-Saint-François;
- 7.5 kilometres (4.7 mi) south of downtown Baie-Saint-Paul;
- 31.4 kilometres (19.5 mi) north of downtown Saint-Tite-des-Caps.

From the dam at the mouth of this small head lake, the course of this river flows in urban areas over 4.2 kilometres (2.6 mi) down the mountain with a drop of 405 metres (1,329 ft), according to the following segments:

- 1.7 kilometres (1.1 mi) towards the south-east in a small valley more and more flared, until the discharge of a stream (coming from the west);
- 2.5 kilometres (1.6 mi) towards the south-east, with a drop of 347 metres (1,138 ft) in a deep valley crossing a residential sector and crossing the railway which runs along the bank of the St. Lawrence River, to its mouth.

The Vieille Rivière flows onto the northwest shore of the Saint-Laurent river, on the north side of Pointe des Grandes Mules, in the area designated "Anse de la Vieille Rivière", in the municipality of Petite-Rivière-Saint-François. This confluence is located at:

- 10.0 kilometres (6.2 mi) south of downtown Baie-Saint-Paul;
- 6.1 kilometres (3.8 mi) north of the center of the village of Petite-Rivière-Saint-François;
- 5.3 kilometres (3.3 mi) east of route 138;
- 2.2 kilometres (1.4 mi) north of the hamlet "Maillard".

== Toponymy ==
The toponymic designation "La Veille Rivière" appears in "A treasure in the mountains" by Marthe B. Hogue. It was collected by an investigation in August 1976. The designation "brook of the Moulin à Scie" turns out to be a variant of the official name, which had been formalized on September 22, 1976.

The toponym "La Vieille Rivière" was formalized on August 7, 1978 at the Place Names Bank of the Commission de toponymie du Québec.

== See also ==
- Capitale-Nationale, an administrative region
- Charlevoix Regional County Municipality, a regional county municipality (MRC)
- Petite-Rivière-Saint-François, a municipality
- St. Lawrence River
- List of rivers of Quebec
