= Thompson River (De Montigny Lake tributary) =

River in Abitibi, Quebec, Canada

Location
- Country: Canada
- Province: Quebec
- Region: Abitibi-Témiscamingue
- MRC: La Vallée-de-l'Or Regional County Municipality

Physical characteristics
- Source: Lemoine Lake
  - location: Val-d'Or
  - coordinates: 48°03′56″N 77°52′34″W
  - elevation: 296 m (971 ft)
- Mouth: De Montigny Lake
  - location: Val-d'Or
  - coordinates: 48°05′14″N 77°52′41″W
  - elevation: 294 m (965 ft)
- Length: 4.9 km (3.0 mi)

Basin features
- Tributaries
  - left: (upstream)
  - right: (upstream)

The Thompson River is a tributary of the south shore of De Montigny Lake, flowing in the town of Val-d'Or, in the La Vallée-de-l'Or Regional County Municipality, in the administrative region of Abitibi-Témiscamingue, in Quebec, in Canada.

Recreational tourism is the sector's primary economic activity, including pleasure boating on De Montigny lakes, Blouin and Lemoine Lake. This strait includes a marina. (at south of the strait) and a seaplane base (in the middle of the strait). In addition, a railway bridge and a road bridge cross this strait which is located on the west side of the city of Val-d'Or.

The surface of the Thompson River is generally frozen from mid-December to mid-April.

== Geography ==
The neighboring watersheds of the Thompson River are:

- north side: Harricana River, Lac De Montigny, Milky River;
- east side: Sabourin Lake, Marrias River, Sabourin River;
- south side: Lemoine lake, Mourier Lake;
- west side: Piché River, Fournière Lake.

The source of the Thompson River is located at the mouth of Lemoine Lake (Val-d'Or) which is mainly fed by a strait (from the southwest) connecting it to Mourier Lake.

From its source, the Thompson River flows 4.9 km (3.0 mi) northward forming a navigable strait and collects the waters of the Piché River (coming from the west).

The Thompson River flows on the south shore of Lac De Montigny to:

- 20.2 km (12.6 mi) south-east of the outlet of the Harricana River in Malartic Lake;
- 7.8 km (4.8 mi) south of the mouth of Lac De Montigny;
- 5.8 km (3.6 mi) west of downtown Val-d'Or;
- 10.2 km (6.3 mi) north-east of Lac Fournière;
- 1.8 km (1.1 mi) north of the hamlet of Rivière-Thompson.

== Toponymy ==
The toponym Thompson river was formalized on December 21, 1982 at the Commission de toponymie du Québec.

== See also ==
- James Bay, a body of water
- List of rivers of Quebec
