= Caouette Stream =

River in Quebec, Canada

- Location within Quebec
- Native name: Ruisseau Caouette (French)

Location
- Country: Canada
- Province: Quebec
- Region: Estrie, Chaudière-Appalaches
- MRC: Beauce-Sartigan Regional County Municipality, Le Granit Regional County Municipality

Physical characteristics
- Source: Mountain streams
  - location: Saint-Théophile
  - coordinates: 45.809138°N 70.466047°W
  - elevation: 491 metres (1,611 ft)
- Mouth: Rivière du Loup
  - location: Saint-Robert-Bellarmin
  - coordinates: 45.77333°N 70.5225°W
  - elevation: 372 metres (1,220 ft)
- Length: 5.6 kilometres (3.5 mi)

Basin features
- Progression: Rivière du Loup, Chaudière River, St. Lawrence River
- River system: St. Lawrence River
- Tributaries
  - left: (upstream) Petit ruisseau Caouette
  - right: (upstream)

The Caouette stream (in French: ruisseau Caouette) flows in the municipalities of Saint-Théophile (MRC Beauce-Sartigan Regional County Municipality) and Saint-Robert-Bellarmin (MRC Le Granit Regional County Municipality), in the administrative region of Chaudière-Appalaches, in Quebec, in Canada.

== Toponymy ==
The toponym "Ruisseau Caouette" was made official on December 5, 1968, at the Commission de toponymie du Québec.

== See also ==
- List of rivers of Quebec
