= Rivière à Lacaille =

River in Chaudière-Appalaches, Quebec, Canada

Lacaille River
- Native name: Rivière Lacaille (French)

Location
- Country: Canada
- Province: Quebec
- Region: Chaudière-Appalaches
- Desjardins Regional County Municipality: MRC

Physical characteristics
- Source: Agricultural streams
  - location: Saint-Pierre-de-la-Rivière-du-Sud
  - coordinates: 46.94259725°N 70.65119865°W
  - elevation: 35 metres (115 ft)
- Mouth: St. Lawrence River
  - location: Montmagny
  - coordinates: 46.98917°N 70.5875°W
  - elevation: 4 metres (13 ft)
- Length: 12.8 km (8.0 mi)

Basin features
- Progression: St. Lawrence River
- Tributaries
  - left: (upstream)

The rivière à Lacaille (in English: Lacaille River) is a tributary of the south shore of the St. Lawrence River. This watercourse flows in the municipalities of Saint-Pierre-de-la-Rivière-du-Sud and Montmagny, in the Montmagny Regional County Municipality, in the administrative region of Chaudière-Appalaches, in Quebec, in Canada.

== Toponymy ==
The toponym Rivière à Lacaille was formalized on December 5, 1968, at the Commission de toponymie du Québec.

== See also ==
- List of rivers of Quebec
