= Rouilles River =

Location
- Country: Canada
- Province: Quebec
- Region: Mauricie
- City: Shawinigan
- Sector: Lac-à-la-Tortue

Physical characteristics
- Source: Stream draining a marsh area
  - location: Shawinigan (sector Lac-à-la-Tortue)
  - coordinates: 46.573095°N 72.633059°W
  - elevation: 125 m (410 ft)
- Mouth: Saint-Maurice River
  - location: Shawinigan (sector Lac-à-la-Tortue)
  - coordinates: 46.578125°N 72.681135°W
  - elevation: 79 m (259 ft)
- Length: 4.4 km (2.7 mi)

Basin features
- Progression: Saint-Maurice River, Saint Lawrence River
- Tributaries
  - right: Discharge of lac Pratte

The Rivière aux Rouilles (English: Rusty River) is a tributary of the Saint-Maurice River, flowing on the north bank of the Saint Lawrence River, entirely in the Lac à la Tortue from the city of Shawinigan, in the administrative region of Mauricie, in the province of Quebec, in Canada.

The course of the Rouilles river descends into the forest zone, passing from the south side of the hamlet Lac-Pratte. Its upper course drains marsh areas on the east and south sides.

== Geography ==
The Rivière aux Rouilles rises at the southwestern limit of the Lac-à-la-Tortue Ecological Reserve in the Lac-à-la-Tortue sector of the town of Shawinigan. This source is located at:

- 3.9 kilometres (2.4 mi) south-east of Lac à la Tortue;
- 2.6 kilometres (1.6 mi) south-east of the south-east bank of the Saint-Maurice River;
- 1.8 kilometres (1.1 mi) north-west of the limit of Notre-Dame-du-Mont-Carmel.

From its source, the Rouilles river flows over 4.4 kilometres (2.7 mi), according to the following segments:

- 2.8 kilometres (1.7 mi) westward, to the bridge on chemin Saint-Mathieu range
- 1.6 kilometres (0.99 mi) north-west, to its confluence.

The Rivière aux Rouilles flows into a river curve on the south bank of the Saint-Maurice River upstream from the Shawinigan dam and downstream from the railway bridge which spans the Saint-Maurice River at the foot from the Grand-Mère dam. The confluence of the Rivière aux Rouilles is located upstream of the La Gabelle dam at:

- 4.8 kilometres (3.0 mi) downstream of the Grand-Mère dam;
- 1.5 kilometres (0.93 mi) upstream of the Ile des Hêtres located upstream of the Shawinigan dam on the Saint-Maurice river.

== Toponymy ==
The toponym Rivière aux Rouilles was formalized on March 6, 1975, at the Commission de toponymie du Québec.

== See also ==
- List of rivers of the Saint-Maurice basin
- List of rivers of Quebec
