= Rivière aux Cailloux =

- Location within Quebec

Location
- Country: Canada
- Province: Quebec
- Region: Côte-Nord
- RCM: Minganie
- Island: Anticosti Island

Physical characteristics
- Source: Marsh zone
  - location: L'Île-d'Anticosti
  - coordinates: 49.82838°N 63.74558°W
  - elevation: 111 m (364 ft)
- Mouth: Gulf of Saint Lawrence
  - location: L'Île-d'Anticosti
  - coordinates: 49.64889°N 63.86861°W
  - elevation: 1 metre (3 ft 3 in)
- Length: 27.3 km (17.0 mi)

Basin features
- Tributaries
  - left: (upstream) two streams, discharge from Lac Perdu, two streams.
  - right: (upstream) discharge from the Petit lac aux Cailloux, discharge from a stream (via Lac aux Cailloux).

The rivière aux Cailloux (English: Pebble River) is a tributary of the Gulf of St. Lawrence, flowing in the municipality of L'Île-d'Anticosti, in the Minganie Regional County Municipality, in the administrative region of North Shore, in province of Quebec, in Canada.

The course of the intermediate part (from Lac aux Cailloux, going south) of this watercourse delimits the western zone of SÉPAQ Anticosti.

The main forest road (east-west) of Anticosti Island serves the upper part of this valley. Secondary roads connect to this main road, as well as westward to a forest road network for forestry purposes.

Forestry is the main economic activity in this area; recreational tourism activities, second.

== Geography ==
The Rivière aux Cailloux draws its source from Lac Noël (length: 0.8 km (0.50 mi); altitude: 111 m (364 ft)) located in the center-west of Anticosti Island. This lake is surrounded by marshes. The mouth of Lac Noël is located at:

- 43.2 km (26.8 mi) northeast of the town center of the village of Port-Menier;
- 4.7 km (2.9 mi) south of the north shore of Anticosti Island;
- 21.7 km (13.5 mi) north of the south shore of Anticosti Island.

From its source, the Rivière aux Cailloux flows south between the Sainte-Marie River (located on the west side) and the Sainte-Anne River (located on the east side). Its course descends on 27.3 km (17.0 mi) towards the south with a drop of 110 m (360 ft), according to the following segments:

Upper part of the Rivière aux Cailloux (segment of 10.1 km (6.3 mi))

- 1.6 km (0.99 mi) first south through a narrow area of marsh to Lake Lejeune (length: 0.86 km (0.53 mi); altitude: 108 m (354 ft)) that it crosses on 0.3 km (0.19 mi) towards the southwest;
- 5.4 km (3.4 mi) towards the south passing under the bridge of the main road (east–west direction) of the island, collecting two streams (coming from the north-east), up to a bend river; by forming a hook towards the south-west, up to a bend in the river;
- 3.1 km (1.9 mi) towards the south-east, collecting two streams (coming from the north-east), up to a bend in the river; by turning towards the southwest, then forming a loop towards the north where it collects a stream (coming from the north), to the north shore of Lac aux Cailloux;

Lower part of Rivière aux Cailloux (segment of 17.2 km (10.7 mi))

- 11.2 km (7.0 mi) towards the south, crossing first the lac aux Cailloux (length: 1.2 km (0.75 mi); altitude: 62 m (203 ft)), relatively straight line, collecting the discharge (coming from the northeast) of Lac Perdu, and collecting a stream (coming from the northeast), to the southern part of the SÉPAQ territory. Note: From halfway through Lac aux Cailloux, the course of Rivière aux Cailloux delimits the western part of SÉPAQ Anticosti;
- 6.0 km (3.7 mi) towards the south, first by collecting the discharge (coming from the west) of Petit lac aux Cailloux, up to its mouth.

The Rivière aux Cailloux flows on the south shore of Anticosti Island, i.e. 3.5 km (2.2 mi) east of Cap Sainte-Marie, 3.0 km (1.9 mi) at west of Anse Sainte-Anne where the Sainte-Anne river flows and 39.6 km (24.6 mi) east of the center of the village of Port-Menier.

== Toponymy ==
This toponymic designation appears in the 1904 book, entitled "Monographie de l'Île Anticosti". This toponym also appears on a 1955 map of the Consolidated Bathurst company.

The toponym "rivière aux Cailloux" was made official on September 12, 1974

== See also ==
- List of rivers of Quebec
