= Novide River =

Novide
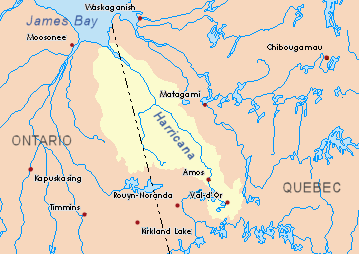
- Harricana River basin in yellow

Location
- Country: Canada
- Province: Quebec
- Region: Eeyou Istchee Baie-James (municipality)

Physical characteristics
- Source: Creek in marsh area
  - location: Eeyou Istchee Baie-James (municipality), Nord-du-Québec, Quebec
  - coordinates: 41°17′27″N 79°05′44″W
  - elevation: 16 m (52 ft)
- Mouth: James Bay
  - location: Eeyou Istchee Baie-James (municipalité), Nord-du-Québec, Quebec
  - coordinates: 51°32′05″N 79°15′15″W
  - elevation: 0 m (0 ft)
- Length: 30.2 km (18.8 mi)

Basin features
- Tributaries
  - left: (from the mouth) Nistam Utameau creek, Kachiskamisechishit creek.

The Novide River is a tributary of the south shore of Cabbage Willows Bay on the Ministikawatin Peninsula, in the James Bay Reserve, in the municipality of Eeyou Istchee Baie-James, in Jamésie, in the administrative region of Nord-du-Québec, in Quebec, Canada.

The surface of the river is usually frozen from early November to mid-May, however, safe ice circulation is generally from mid-November to mid-April.

== Geography ==
The hydrographic slopes adjacent to the Novide River are:

- North side: Cabbage Willows Bay, Rupert Bay, James Bay, Inenw Passage;
- East side: Rupert's Bay, Nottaway River, Broadback River;
- South side: Iscouistic River, Missisicabi River, Octave River (Rupert Bay), Harricana River;
- West side: Harricana River, Hannah Bay.

The Novide River originates 29.4 kilometres (18.3 mi) east of the Ontario border, 29.6 kilometres (18.4 mi) southeast of the mouth of Novide River (confluence with Cabbage Willows Bay); and 12.9 kilometres (8.0 mi) west of the mouth of the Nottaway River.

The course of the Novide River runs for 38.0 kilometres (23.6 mi) skirting the Nesukauchi hill on the West, according to the following segments:

- 19.4 kilometres (12.1 mi) Northwest in marsh areas to Kachiskamisechishit Creek (from the South);
- 18.6 kilometres (11.6 mi) westward into marsh areas by collecting Nistam Utameu Creek (coming from the South) and crossing 1.7 kilometres (1.1 mi) of sandstone at its mouth.

The mouth of the Little Missisicabi River is located on the flanks of the eastern shore of Hannah Bay, in Quebec, an appendage south of James Bay. This mouth is located only 12.1 kilometres (7.5 mi) north of the mouth of the Harricana River at 103.8 kilometres (64.5 mi) east of the mouth of the Moose River, Ontario and 34.9 kilometres (21.7 mi) west of the mouth of the Nottaway River.

== Toponymy ==
The term "Novide" is a name of French origin.

The toponym Novide River was formalized on December 5, 1968, at the Bank of Place Names of the Commission de toponymie du Québec, i.e. at the creation of this commission.

== See also ==
- List of rivers of Quebec
