= Rivière aux Ours (Sainte-Anne River tributary) =

- Location within Quebec

Location
- Country: Canada
- Province: Quebec
- Region: Capitale-Nationale
- Regional County Municipality: Portneuf Regional County Municipality
- Municipality: Saint-Raymond

Physical characteristics
- Source: Swamp area
  - location: Saint-Raymond
  - coordinates: 46.86430°N 71.84351°W
  - elevation: 154 m (505 ft)
- Mouth: Talayarde River
  - location: Saint-Raymond
  - coordinates: 46.83694°N 71.8775°W
  - elevation: 129 m (423 ft)
- Length: 6.6 km (4.1 mi)

Basin features
- Tributaries
  - left: (Upward from the mouth) Unidentified stream, discharge from Plamondon lake, discharge from an unidentified lake, discharge from an unidentified lake.
  - right: (Upward from the mouth) Discharge of two small unidentified lakes.

The rivière aux Ours is a tributary of the Sainte-Anne river flowing in the municipality of Saint-Raymond, in the Portneuf Regional County Municipality, in the administrative region of Capitale-Nationale, in Quebec, in Canada.

The small valley of the Rivière aux Ours is served by the Corcoran road and the Chute-Panet road which runs along the south and east bank of the Sainte-Anne river, for the needs of agriculture, forestry and residents of the sector.

The main economic activities of the sector are agriculture and forestry.

The surface of the Bear River (except the rapids areas) is generally frozen from the beginning of December to the end of March; however, safe circulation on the ice is generally from late December to early March. The water level of the river varies with the seasons and the precipitation; the spring flood occurs in March or April.

== Geography ==
The Bear River has its source at the mouth in a marsh area (length: 2.5 kilometres (1.6 mi); altitude 154 metres (505 ft)) located on the south side of the Pionniers Industrial Park at Saint-Raymond. This source is located at:

- 1.8 kilometres (1.1 mi) east of the course of the Sainte-Anne river;
- 3.4 kilometres (2.1 mi) south of the village center of Saint-Raymond;
- 4.0 kilometres (2.5 mi) north of the confluence of Rivière aux Ours and Rivière Sainte-Anne;
- 44.1 kilometres (27.4 mi) to the north, the confluence of the latter with the St. Lawrence River.

From its source, the Bear River flows over 6.6 kilometres (4.1 mi) especially in forest areas, sometimes agricultural, with a drop of 25 metres (82 ft), according to the following segments:

- 1.7 kilometres (1.1 mi) especially in the marsh area, first towards the west, then towards the south, up to the Cormoran road bridge;
- 1.8 kilometres (1.1 mi) towards the southwest by crossing rue Germain, up to a bend in the river;
- 3.1 kilometres (1.9 mi) first towards the south-east by forming a hook (curving towards the east), collecting two discharges (coming from the east) from unidentified lakes and the discharge (via a small lake) (coming from the east) of Lac Plamondon, passing north of a hamlet, crossing route 354, then crossing two small unidentified lakes, until its mouth.

The Bear River flows at the end of a bend on the south bank of the Sainte-Anne River. This confluence is located at:

- 6.3 kilometres (3.9 mi) upstream of the Ford Falls in Sainte-Christine-d'Auvergne;
- 4.1 kilometres (2.5 mi) downstream from the hamlet Chute-Panet in Saint-Raymond;
- 16.2 kilometres (10.1 mi) to the north-west of the St. Lawrence River;
- 7.1 kilometres (4.4 mi) south of the village center of Saint-Raymond;
- 40.2 kilometres (25.0 mi) north of the confluence of the Sainte-Anne river with the Saint-Laurent river.

From this confluence, the current descends on 69.1 kilometres (42.9 mi) generally south and southwest following the course of the Sainte-Anne river, to the northwest bank of the Saint Lawrence river.

== Toponymy ==
The toponym "Rivière aux Ours" was formalized on August 17, 1978, at the Place Names Bank of the Commission de toponymie du Québec.

== See also ==
- List of rivers of Quebec
