= Rivière du Petit Portage =

River in Chaudière-Appalaches, Quebec, Canada

- Location within Quebec

Location
- Country: Canada
- Province: Quebec
- Region: Chaudière-Appalaches
- MRC: Beauce-Sartigan Regional County Municipality

Physical characteristics
- Source: Douglas Lake
  - location: Saint-Hilaire-de-Dorset
  - coordinates: 45.833246°N 70.754435°W
  - elevation: 430 metres (1,410 ft)
- Mouth: Chaudière River
  - location: Saint-Gédéon-de-Beauce
  - coordinates: 45.84694°N 70.64639°W
  - elevation: 255 metres (837 ft)
- Length: 6.8 kilometres (4.2 mi)
- Basin size: 27.2 kilometres (16.90 mi)

Basin features
- Progression: Chaudière River, St. Lawrence River
- River system: St. Lawrence River
- Tributaries
  - left: (upstream)
  - right: (upstream)

The rivière du Petit Portage (in English: Little Portage River) is a tributary of the west bank of the Chaudière River which flows northward to empty onto the south shore of the St. Lawrence River.

The Petit Portage river flows in the municipalities of Saint-Hilaire-de-Dorset and Saint-Gédéon-de-Beauce, in the Beauce-Sartigan Regional County Municipality (MRC), in the administrative region of Chaudière-Appalaches, in Quebec, in Canada.

== Toponymy ==
The toponym Rivière du Petit Portage was formalized on February 28, 1980, at the Commission de toponymie du Québec.

== See also ==
- List of rivers of Quebec
