= Rivière au Saumon (Baie James) =

Rivière Saumon

Location
- Country: Canada
- Province: Quebec
- Region: Nord-du-Québec
- Municipality: Baie-James

Physical characteristics
- Source: Little unidentified lake
  - location: Baie-James
  - coordinates: 54°41′38″N 79°20′17″W
  - elevation: 29.6 m (97 ft)
- Mouth: James Bay
  - location: Baie-James
  - coordinates: 54°41′38″N 79°20′17″W
  - elevation: 0 m (0 ft)
- Length: 25.8 km (16.0 mi)

Basin features
- Progression: James Bay, Hudson Bay
- Tributaries
  - left: (upstream)
  - right: (upstream)

The Rivière au Saumon (English: Salmon River) is a tributary of the northeast shore of James Bay, flowing in the municipality of Baie-James, in the administrative region from Nord-du-Québec, in the province of Quebec, in Canada.

This northern area of Quebec does not have passable roads. However, in winter, snowmobiles are used to circulate in this area.

== Geography ==
The Salmon River originates at the mouth of an unidentified lake (length: 1.0 km (0.62 mi); altitude: 29.5 m (97 ft)) in the northwest part of the territory from Baie-James. This source is located at:

- 28.7 km (17.8 mi) north-east of Pointe Louis-XIV which delimits Hudson Bay and James Bay;
- 20.7 km (12.9 mi) north of the mouth of the rivière au Phoque (Baie James);
- 150 km (93 mi) north-west of the village centre of Radisson which is situated on the west bank of the Robert-Bourassa Reservoir.

From its source, the Salmon River flows over 25.8 km (16.0 mi) with a drop of 29.6 m (97 ft), towards the southwest in parallel with the east bank of the Hudson Bay at a distance of approximately 8.0 km (5.0 mi), according to the following segments:

- 6.5 km (4.0 mi) to the southwest crossing a small lake, then crossing Lake Nanuup (length: 3.9 km (2.4 mi); altitude: 27.5 m (90 ft)), to its mouth;
- 11.4 km (7.1 mi) first towards the southwest crossing an unidentified lake (length: 2.4 km (1.5 mi); altitude: 27.3 m (90 ft)) in forming a loop towards the southwest, then crossing Lake Mayuagag (length: 6.9 km (4.3 mi); altitude: 25.0 m (82.0 ft)) first towards the northeast to go around a peninsula, then southwesterly, to its mouth;
- 7.9 km (4.9 mi) south-west, to its mouth.

The Rivière au Salmon flows into the bottom of a bay on the northeast shore of James Bay. This confluence is located at:

- 7.1 km (4.4 mi) east of a small regional airport;
- 11.1 km (6.9 mi) north-west of the mouth of the Seal River;
- 11.4 km (7.1 mi) north-east of Pointe Louis-XIV.

== Toponymy ==
The toponym “Rivière au Saumon” was formalized on December 5, 1968, at the Place Names Bank of the Commission de toponymie du Québec.

== See also ==
- List of rivers of Quebec
