= Rivière de la Bogue =

River in Estrie, Quebec, Canada

Location
- Country: Canada
- Province: Quebec
- Region: Estrie
- MRC: Le Haut-Saint-François Regional County Municipality
- Municipality: Weedon

Physical characteristics
- Source: Little lake
  - location: Weedon
  - coordinates: 45.668302°N 71.567442°W
  - elevation: 335 m (1,099 ft)
- Mouth: Saint-François River
  - location: Dudswell
  - coordinates: 45.63028°N 71.51361°W
  - elevation: 201 m (659 ft)
- Length: 11.2 km (7.0 mi)

Basin features
- Progression: Saint-François River, St. Lawrence River

The Bogue River is a small river that crosses the municipalities of Weedon and Dudswell, Quebec, in the Le Haut-Saint-François Regional County Municipality (MRC), the administrative region of Estrie, in Quebec, in Canada.

== Geography ==
The neighboring hydrographic slopes of the Bogue River are:

- north side: Paré stream, rivière Nicolet Centre;
- east side: Paré stream, Saint-François River;
- south side: Saint-François River;
- west side: outlet of Lac d'Argent, Nicolet River.

The unnamed small lake (altitude: 335 metres (1,099 ft)) is the source of the Bogue River. It is located in the western part of the municipality of Weedon, west of Weeland Lake, south of "Lac Fer à Cheval" and west of "Montagne d'Adjutor".

From its source, the Bogue River flows on 11.2 kilometres (7.0 mi) in the following segments:

- 0.3 kilometres (0.19 mi) southwesterly, to the municipal boundary between Weedon and Dudswell;
- 1.9 kilometres (1.2 mi) southwesterly, to the foot of the southeastern slope of "Montagne d'Adjutor" located in the municipality of Dudswell;
- 2.2 kilometres (1.4 mi) south-east, up to route 112;
- 4.2 kilometres (2.6 mi) south to the road;
- 2.6 kilometres (1.6 mi) eastward, to its mouth.

The Bogue river empties on the northwest shore of the Saint-François River, at 1.8 kilometres (1.1 mi) downstream from the mouth of Paré brook, downstream from the village of Weedon Centre, upstream from the village of Bishopton.

== Toponymy ==
The toponym "rivière de la Bogue" was made official on November 7, 1985, at the Commission de toponymie du Québec.

== See also ==
- List of rivers of Quebec
