= Rivière des Fèves =

Location
- Country: Canada
- Province: Quebec
- Region: Montérégie
- MRC: Beauharnois-Salaberry Regional County Municipality

Physical characteristics
- Source: various agricultural streams
  - location: Saint-Urbain-Premier
  - coordinates: 45.17122°N 73.751355°W
  - elevation: 41 m (135 ft)
- Mouth: Châteauguay River
  - location: Sainte-Martine
  - coordinates: 45.231452°N 73.814365°W
  - elevation: 38 m (125 ft)
- Length: 9.6 km (6.0 mi)

Basin features
- Progression: Châteauguay River - Saint Lawrence River
- Tributaries
  - right: (from the mouth) ruisseau Orphir-Lazure, ruisseau Yelle.

The rivière des Fèves is a tributary of the Châteauguay River. It flows in the municipalities of Saint-Urbain-Premier and Sainte-Martine, in the Beauharnois-Salaberry Regional County Municipality, in the region administrative Montérégie, Quebec, Canada).

The course of the river is served on the northeast side by the Rivière-des-Fèves North road and on the southwest side by the Rivière-des-Fèves Sud road.

The river surface is generally frozen from mid-December to the end of March. Safe circulation on the ice is generally done from the end of December to the beginning of March. The water level of the river varies with the seasons and the precipitation.

== Geography ==
The main hydrographic slopes neighbouring the Rivière-des-Fèves are:

- north side: Châteauguay River;
- east side: Clermont stream, Noire river;
- south side: Rivière des Anglais;
- west side: Châteauguay River, Bouchard stream, rivière des Anglais.

Rivière-des-Fèves rises west of the hamlet "Norton Creek", north of Chemn des Bourdeau.

Throughout its course towards the northwest, the river is bordered by a road on the northeast side (rang de la Rivière des Fèves Nord) and another on the southwest side (rang de la Rivière des Fèves Sud), except its last segment.

The Rivière des Fèves flows northwest on 9.6 km (6.0 mi) in agricultural areas, collecting several streams.

The river flows on the south bank of the Châteauguay River, south of the village of Sainte-Martine, 2.4 kilometres (1.5 mi) downstream from the mouth of the English River and about 240 metres (790 ft) downstream from the route 138 bridge.

== Toponymy ==
The toponym "Rivière des Fèves" was formalized on December 5, 1968, at the Commission de toponymie du Québec.

== See also ==
- List of rivers of Quebec
