= Rivière du Moulin (Chaudière River tributary) =

River in Estrie, Quebec, Canada

- Location within Quebec

Location
- Country: Canada
- Province: Quebec
- Region: Estrie
- MRC: Beauce-Sartigan Regional County Municipality

Physical characteristics
- Source: Agricultural streams of third and fourth rang
  - location: Saint-Gédéon-de-Beauce
  - coordinates: 45.876°N 70.551°W
  - elevation: 422 metres (1,385 ft)
- Mouth: Chaudière River
  - location: Saint-Gédéon-de-Beauce
  - coordinates: 45.87778°N 70.625°W
  - elevation: 241 metres (791 ft)
- Length: 6.3 kilometres (3.9 mi)

Basin features
- Progression: Chaudière River, St. Lawrence River
- River system: St. Lawrence River
- Tributaries
  - left: (upstream)
  - right: (upstream)

The rivière du Moulin (in English: Mill River) is a tributary of the east bank of the Chaudière River, which flows northward to empty on the south bank of the St. Lawrence River.

== Toponymy ==
The toponym Rivière du Moulin was made official on December 5, 1968, at the Commission de toponymie du Québec.

== See also ==
- List of rivers of Quebec
