= Landry River (Manic Deux Reservoir tributary) =

River in Manicouagan, Quebec (Canada)

- Location within Quebec
- Native name: Rivière Landry (French)

Location
- Country: Canada
- Province: Quebec
- Region: Côte-Nord
- MRC: Manicouagan Regional County Municipality
- Municipality: Rivière-aux-Outardes

Physical characteristics
- Mouth: Manicouagan River
  - location: Rivière-aux-Outardes
  - coordinates: 49.71917°N 68.33444°W
  - elevation: 109 m (358 ft)
- Length: 21.7 km (13.5 mi)

Basin features
- Progression: St. Lawrence River
- River system: Manic 2 Reservoir, Manicouagan River, Gulf of St. Lawrence
- Tributaries
  - left: (upstream)
  - right: (upstream)

The Landry River (in French: rivière Landry) is a tributary of Manic 2 Reservoir, which is crossed from North to South by Manicouagan River. It flows into the non organized territory of Rivière-aux-Outardes, in the Manicouagan Regional County Municipality (MRC), in the administrative region of Côte-Nord, in Quebec, in Canada.

== Geography ==
The Landry River has its source at the mouth of an unidentified lake (length: 0.4 kilometres (0.25 mi); elevation: 456 metres (1,496 ft)) in Rivière-aux-Outardes. This mouth of this lake is located 58.2 kilometres (36.2 mi) northwest of Manic 2 Reservoir dam and at 73 kilometres (45 mi) northeast of the bridge of route 138.

From its source, the Landry River descends entirely in forested area on 21.7 kilometres (13.5 mi) towards the southeast and from halfway to eastbound, with a drop of 347 metres (1,138 ft). The initial length of the river was 27.9 km before the raise of water level of the Manic 2 Reservoir.

The Landry River empties at the western end of a strait which goes on 6.2 kilometres (3.9 mi) toward east, then 48.1 kilometres (29.9 mi) southbound up to the dam of Manic 2 Reservoir. Th is reservoir is crossed to the South by the Manicouagan River.

== Toponymy ==
The term "Landry" turns out to be a family name of French origin.

The toponym "rivière Landry" was made official on August 2, 1974, at the Commission de toponymie du Québec.

== See also ==
- List of rivers of Quebec
