= Rivière du Monument =

River in Quebec, Canada

- Location within Quebec

Location
- Country: Canada
- Province: Quebec
- Region: Chaudière-Appalaches
- MRC: Beauce-Sartigan Regional County Municipality

Physical characteristics
- Source: Monument Lake, located near the border of Maine (United States)
  - location: Saint-Théophile
  - coordinates: 45.801494°N 70.413421°W
  - elevation: 572 metres (1,877 ft)
- Mouth: Rivière du Loup
  - location: Saint-Théophile
  - coordinates: 45.86167°N 70.47278°W
  - elevation: 360 metres (1,180 ft)
- Length: 10.3 kilometres (6.4 mi)

Basin features
- Progression: Rivière du Loup, Chaudière River, St. Lawrence River
- River system: St. Lawrence River
- Tributaries
  - left: (upstream)
  - right: (upstream)

The rivière du Monument (English: Monument River) flows in the municipality of Saint-Théophile, in the Beauce-Sartigan Regional County Municipality, in the administrative region of Chaudière-Appalaches, in Quebec, in Canada. The Monument River is a tributary of the south bank of the rivière du Loup, which drains on the east bank of the Chaudière River; the latter flows northward to empty on the south shore of the St. Lawrence River.

== Toponymy ==
The toponym Rivière du Monument was made official on December 5, 1968, at the Commission de toponymie du Québec.

== See also ==
- List of rivers of Quebec
