= False River (Quebec) =

River in Quebec, Canada

Location
- Country: Canada

Physical characteristics
- Source
  - coordinates: 56°59′58″N 67°46′23″W
  - elevation: 245 m (804 ft)
- Mouth
  - location: Ungava Bay
  - coordinates: 58°29′0″N 67°50′35″W
  - elevation: 0 m (0 ft)
- Length: 180 km (110 mi)

False River (French: Rivière False) is a river in Nunavik, Quebec, Canada. It originates 8 km (5.0 mi) north of Lac Boulle and ends 50 km (31 mi) northeast of Kuujjuaq in Ungava Bay.
