= Millette River =

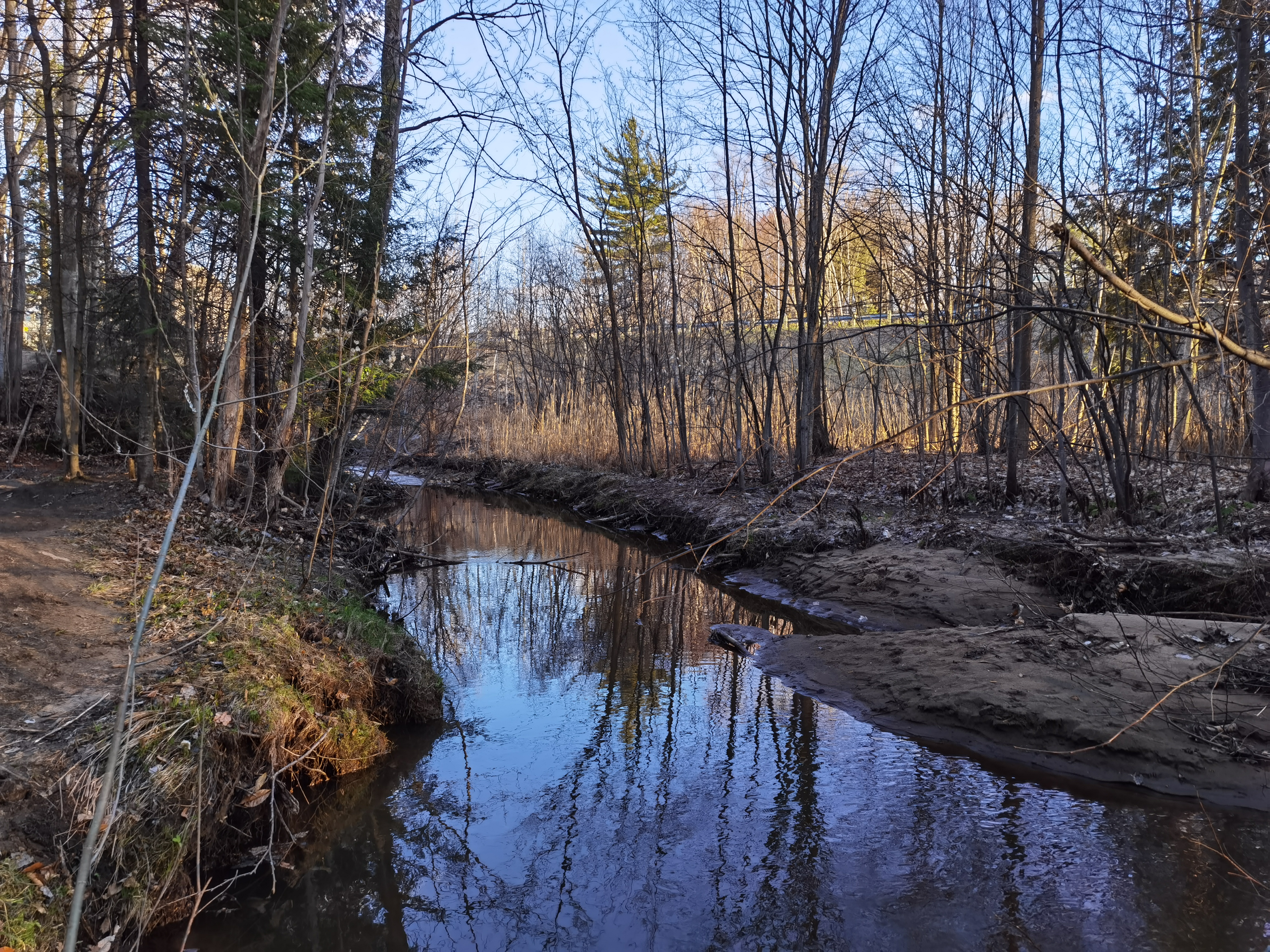

Location
- Country: Canada
- Province: Quebec
- Region: Mauricie
- City: Trois-Rivières

Physical characteristics
- Source: Lake Caché (hidden lake)
  - location: Trois-Rivières
  - coordinates: 46°22′21″N 72°37′36″W
  - elevation: 60 m (200 ft)
- Mouth: Saint Lawrence River
  - location: Trois-Rivières
  - coordinates: 46°19′06″N 72°33′42″W
  - elevation: 6 m (20 ft)
- Length: 9.5 km (5.9 mi)

Basin features
- Tributaries
  - right: Cours d'eau du Rang Deux

The Millette River (French: Rivière Millette) is a tributary of the north shore of the Saint Lawrence River, flowing in the city of Trois-Rivières, Quebec, Canada.

The surface of the Millette River (except the rapids areas) is generally frozen from mid-December to mid-March, but safe circulation on the ice is generally made from the end of December to the beginning of March. The water level of the river varies with the seasons and the precipitation; the spring flood generally occurs in March or April.

== Geography ==
This watercourse rises at Lac Caché (altitude: 60 metres (200 ft)) located between the railway and the high-voltage lines of Hydro-Québec. This source is 1.3 kilometres (0.81 mi) southwest of the course of the Saint-Maurice River.

From its source (Lac Caché), this river flows over 9.5 kilometres (5.9 mi) to the southeast, with a drop of 54 metres (177 ft), according to the following segments :

- 3.1 kilometres (1.9 mi) towards the south-east by crossing the railway, up to the confluence of the Rang Deux watercourse (coming from the south-west), i.e. south of the Lambert sector;
- 2.1 kilometres (1.3 mi) towards the south-east along the foot of the cliff on the north side of Terrasse-Duvernay, up to boulevard des Récollets;
- 2.0 kilometres (1.2 mi) towards the south-east forming a hook towards the south by again cutting the boulevard des Récollets, branching towards the south-east by crossing an industrial sector, up to highway 40;
- 2.3 kilometres (1.4 mi) towards the south-east by crossing the southern part of the Laurentian Sector including the Sainte-Catherine residential sector (which is located between Trois-Rivières and Trois-Rivières-Ouest), passing on the south side of the town hall, crossing rue Royale, crossing Garceau park and crossing Notre-Dame-Ouest street, up to his mouth.

The Millette River flows onto the northwest shore of the St. Lawrence River, 0.52 kilometres (0.32 mi) north of the Lacerte stream, 4.1 kilometres (2.5 mi) south of the confluence of the Saint-Maurice River and 1.0 kilometre (0.62 mi) north of the Laviolette Bridge which spans the Saint-Laurent river.

== History ==
The historian René Hardy indicates in a writing of 2014 that in 1792, a water mill was erected at the foot of the hill at the height of the current Milette pond. The Milette business family operated a flour and carding mill there at the end of the 19th century. This artificial pond formed by a dam is located on the grounds of UQTR.

The Mon Repos villa was built in 1895 on the edge of a small artificial lake on the middle course of the Millette River. This villa was located on leased land, between boulevard des Chenaux and boulevard des Récollets, on the east side of the Rosemont coast. This private villa with an area of around fifteen acres included around fifteen chalets, a suspension bridge and a kiosk where musical concerts were organized. The heritage of the site was liquidated in April 1932 during the Great Economic Crisis. The Daughters of Jesus acquired the remaining assets on March 12, 1936. Since 1962, a large part of the original site has belonged to the Keranna secondary institute.

According to an article in the newspaper Le Nouvelliste for September 16, 1944, this cooler was located near Chemin Sainte-Marguerite. which is located 2.95 kilometres (1.83 mi) from the shore of the St. Lawrence River. According to Le Nouvelliste of May 26, 1922, a fire of May 24, 1922 towards the middle of the day razed the stable of Mr. Millette, ice-cream merchant of Sainte-Marguerite. Nevertheless, the cooler was protected. The newspaper Le Nouvelliste of August 14, 1923 reports the start of a fire in Charles Millette's cooler.

A notice to the public published on May 2, 1952, in the daily newspaper Le Nouvelliste, of May 2, 1952, indicates that Glacière Millette has just acquired the retail store of artificial ice from Mr. Gustave Brunelle. The business was then operated under "J.H. Millette & Fils" and directed by Charles-Emile Milette. In a July 15, 2002 article in Le Nouvelliste, Michel Cloutier pointed out that around thirty ice sawyers were working at the godendar at the pond of the Milette river and at the canal leading to the Milette glacier. and Brother. He indicates that this canal was located at the turn of Chemin Sainte-Marguerite and Boulevard des Récollets. The columnist Jean-Marc Beaudoin pointed out in the Nouvelliste of June 22, 2006 the Millette cooler as one of the shops in the history of Trois-Rivières. The ice warehouses were gradually replaced between 1950 and 1960 by electrically powered refrigerators.

In 2013, the city of Trois-Rivières modified its urban plan to enlarge the ecological area located near the Rang Deux and Millette rivers, within part of the residential area located respectively near Place de la Marquise and Vincent-Bélanger and Jean-Paul-Lavergne streets.

In late August 2011, a flood of the Milette river invaded part of J.-E.-Janvier, Louis-Camirand and Louis-Julien streets, which are located on the northeast side of the lower course of this river which crosses Trois-Rivières. In 2013, the city of Trois-Rivières carried out stabilization work on the banks of the Millette River south of Notre-Dame-Ouest Street.

== Toponymy ==
The term "Millette" turns out to be a family name of French origin. The term Millette evokes the memory of a Milette business family who for several generations operated a flour and carding mill, then who operated a cooler on the bank of this river during the first half of the 20th century.

Substituted for the term Sainte-Marguerite to designate this watercourse, the term Millette turns out to be a variant of the spelling of the surname Millet. In the course of history, this spelling has two main variants: either the final "te" and the letter L single or double.

This spelling Millet appeared in 1656 in New-France where several descendants of the surname Millet settled between Montreal and Trois-Rivières; another group made roots in the region of Quebec City. In the 1666 census of the government of Trois-Rivières, two individuals with the surname Millet are listed: Pierre Millet (hired in 1656) aged 55, domestic working for Pierre Sonillas, as well as Nicolas Millet, known as Merendas or Marandas (hired in 1658) aged 32, a servant with Antoine Le Maistre, known as Lamorille.

According to a 1926 county map of Saint-Maurice, the mouth of the Millette river corresponds to that of the Sainte-Marguerite river. In 1978, the Commission de toponymie du Québec replaced the toponymic designation "Rivière Sainte-Marguerite" by "Rivière Millette". According to Commission de toponymie du Québec, this third river from the western limit of the Commune served as a marker for the Sainte-Marguerite or Bouvinet seigneury in 1679. Nevertheless, this river remained anonymous for a long time.

The Sainte-Marguerite stream, the mouth of which is located 2.8 kilometres (1.7 mi) southwest of that of the Millette river (i.e. south of the Laviolette bridge), should not therefore be confused with the authentic Rivière Sainte-Marguerite whose toponym was replaced by Rivière Millette.

The toponym "rivière Millette" was formalized on August 17, 1978, at the Commission de toponymie du Québec.
