= Upaunan River =

Upaunan
- Watershed of Nottaway River

Location
- Country: Canada
- Province: Quebec
- Region: Eeyou Istchee Baie-James (municipality)

Physical characteristics
- Source: Creek of marsh
  - location: Eeyou Istchee Baie-James (municipality), Nord-du-Québec, Quebec
  - coordinates: 50°49′27″N 77°08′04″W
  - elevation: 269 m (883 ft)
- Mouth: Broadback River
  - location: Eeyou Istchee Baie-James (municipality), Nord-du-Québec, Quebec
  - coordinates: 50°47′57″N 77°14′50″W
  - elevation: 244 m (801 ft)
- Length: 17.1 km (10.6 mi)

The Upaunan River is a tributary of the Enistustikweyach River in Regional County Municipality (RCM) of Eeyou Istchee James Bay (municipality) in the administrative region of the Nord-du-Québec, in Canadian province of Quebec, in Canada.

The Upaunan River hydrographic slope has no access road nearby; however, the northern route from Matagami passes to 26.3 kilometres (16.3 mi) west of the mouth of the Upaunan River. The surface of the river is usually frozen from early November to mid-May, however, safe ice circulation is generally from mid-November to mid-April.

== Geography ==
The main hydrographic slopes near the Upaunan River are:

- North side: Dana Lake (Eeyou Istchee Baie-James), Du Tast Lake;
- East side: Evans Lake, Broadback River;
- South side: Enistustikweyach River, Iskaskunikaw River, Pauschikushish Ewiwach River, Chabinoche River, Soscumica Lake;
- West side: Dana Lake (Eeyou Istchee Baie-James), Pauschikushish Ewiwach River, Utamikaneu River.

The Upaunan River has its source of a stream (elevation: 269 metres (883 ft)) surrounded by marshes and located at:

- 1.6 kilometres (0.99 mi) Southwest of Evans Lake;
- 8.3 kilometres (5.2 mi) Northeast of the mouth of the Upaunan River;
- 124 kilometres (77 mi) North of downtown Matagami.

From its source, the "Upaunan River" flows on 17.1 kilometres (10.6 mi) according to the following segments:

- 10.2 kilometres (6.3 mi) northwesterly forming a northeasterly curve to a creek (from the Northeast);
- 6.9 kilometres (4.3 mi) southwesterly to the mouth of the river.

== Toponymy ==
Of Cree origin, the toponym "Upaunan River" means: "the river of the camp of the pass".

The toponym "Upaunan River" was formalized on October 5, 1982 at the Commission de toponymie du Québec

== See also ==
- James Bay
- Rupert Bay
- Broadback River, a watercourse
- Evans Lake, a body of water
- Dana Lake (Eeyou Istchee Baie-James), a body of water
- Enistustikweyach River, a watercourse
- List of rivers of Quebec
