= Iyinu Kaniput River =

Iyinu Kaniput
- Watershed of Nottaway River

Location
- Country: Canada
- Province: Quebec
- Region: Eeyou Istchee Baie-James (municipality)

Physical characteristics
- Source: Forested creek
  - location: Eeyou Istchee Baie-James (municipality), Nord-du-Québec, Quebec
  - coordinates: 50°46′24″N 77°24′32″W
  - elevation: 270 m (890 ft)
- Mouth: Du Tast Lake
  - location: Eeyou Istchee Baie-James (municipality), Nord-du-Québec, Quebec
  - coordinates: 50°49′49″N 77°22′39″W
  - elevation: 240 m (790 ft)
- Length: 10.1 km (6.3 mi)

The Iyinu Kaniput River is a tributary of Dana Lake (Eeyou Istchee Baie-James), in Regional County Municipality (RCM) of Eeyou Istchee Baie-James (municipality), in the administrative region of Nord-du-Québec, in the Canadian province of Quebec, in Canada.

The hydrographic slope of the Iyinu Kaniput River is served by the Northern Highway from Matagami passing west of the source of the river to 11.1 kilometres (6.9 mi). The surface of the river is usually frozen from early November to mid-May, however, safe ice circulation is generally from mid-November to mid-April.

== Geography ==
The main hydrographic slopes near the Iyinu Kaniput River are:

- North side: Dana Lake (Eeyou Istchee Baie-James), Du Tast Lake, Columbus Lake, Colomb River, Rupert River;
- East side: Dana Lake (Eeyou Istchee Baie-James), Evans Lake, Broadback River;
- South side: Pauschikushish Ewiwach River, Matawawaskweyau River, Muskiki River, Nottaway River, Soscumica Lake;
- West side: Colomb Lake, Colomb River, Chabouillié Lake, Rodayer Lake, Dusaux Lake, Nottaway River.

The Iyinu Kaniput River originates from a forest stream (elevation: 270 metres (890 ft)) on the Northwest flank of a mountain with a peak of 302 metres (991 ft). The upper part of this river flows mainly in marsh area. Its source is located at:

- 32.7 kilometres (20.3 mi) Northeast of a curve of the Nottaway River;
- 48.2 kilometres (30.0 mi) Northwest of Lake Soscumica;
- 6.8 kilometres (4.2 mi) South of the mouth of the Iyinu Kaniput River;
- 1.9 kilometres (1.2 mi) West of Dana Lake (Eeyou Istchee Baie-James));
- 24.1 kilometres (15.0 mi) Southwest of the mouth of Dana Lake (Eeyou Istchee Baie-James);
- 113.6 kilometres (70.6 mi) North of downtown Matagami.

From its source, the "Iyinu Kaniput River" flows on 10.1 kilometres (6.3 mi) according to the following segments:

- 5.5 kilometres (3.4 mi) to the North in a marsh zone (especially on the west side), to a creek (coming from the Southwest);
- 4.6 kilometres (2.9 mi) Northeasterly to its mouth.

The "Iyinu Kaniput River" flows into a bay on the west shore of Dana Lake (Eeyou Istchee Baie-James). This lake in turn drains into Dana Lake (Eeyou Istchee Baie-James) which empties into a bay west of Evans Lake; this last stretch of water is crossed to the North by the Broadback River.

The mouth of the Iyinu Kaniput River is located at:

- 18.7 kilometres (11.6 mi) Southwest of the mouth of Dana Lake (Eeyou Istchee Baie-James);
- 42.9 kilometres (26.7 mi) Southwest of the mouth of Evans Lake
- 55.7 kilometres (34.6 mi) North of Lake Soscumica;
- 117.8 kilometres (73.2 mi) Southeast of the mouth of the Broadback River;
- 120 kilometres (75 mi) North of downtown Matagami.

== Toponymy ==
The toponym "Iyinu Kaniput River" was formalized on October 5, 1982 at the Commission de toponymie du Québec

== See also ==
- James Bay
- Rupert Bay
- Broadback River, a watercourse
- Evans Lake, a body of water
- Dana Lake (Eeyou Istchee Baie-James), a body of water
- List of rivers of Quebec
