= Kakaskutatakuch River =

Kakaskutatakuch
- Watershed of Nottaway River

Location
- Country: Canada
- Province: Quebec
- Region: Eeyou Istchee Baie-James (municipality)

Physical characteristics
- Source: Forested creek
  - location: Eeyou Istchee Baie-James (municipality), Nord-du-Québec, Quebec
  - coordinates: 50°29′46″N 77°36′59″W
  - elevation: 285 m (935 ft)
- Mouth: Iskaskunikaw River
  - location: Eeyou Istchee Baie-James (municipality), Nord-du-Québec, Quebec
  - coordinates: 50°34′30″N 77°25′45″W
  - elevation: 251 m (823 ft)
- Length: 31.3 km (19.4 mi)

Basin features
- Tributaries
  - left: Pisimwetach Kayspaick creek

The Kakaskutatakuch River is a tributary of the Iskaskunikaw River in Regional County Municipality (RCM) of Eeyou Istchee James Bay (municipality) in the area of the Nord-du-Québec, Canadian province of Quebec, in Canada.

The hydrographic slope of the Kakaskutatakuch River is served by the northern route coming from Matagami and cutting the upper course of the river. The surface of the river is usually frozen from early November to mid-May, however, safe ice circulation is generally from mid-November to mid-April.

== Geography ==
The main hydrographic slopes near the Kakaskutatakuch River are:

- North side: Dana Lake (Eeyou Istchee Baie-James), Du Tast Lake;
- East side: Pauschikushish Ewiwach River, Iskaskunikaw River, Enistustikweyach River, Evans Lake, Broadback River;
- South side: Muskiki River, Nottaway River, Lake Soscumica;
- West side: Takutachun Creek Kakuskwapiminakuch, Lake Dusaux, Nottaway River.

The Kakaskutatakuch River originates from a forest stream (elevation: 285 metres (935 ft)) located at:

- 9.1 kilometres (5.7 mi) Northeast of a curve of the Nottaway River;
- 20.3 kilometres (12.6 mi) North of the mouth of Soscumica Lake;
- 16.6 kilometres (10.3 mi) Southeast of the mouth of the Kakaskutatakuch River;
- 35 kilometres (22 mi) Southeast of the mouth of the Pauschikushish Ewiwach River (confluence with Dana Lake (Eeyou Istchee Baie-James));
- 62.5 kilometres (38.8 mi) Southwest of the mouth of Dana Lake (Eeyou Istchee Baie-James);
- 90 kilometres (56 mi) North of downtown Matagami.

From the confluence of Kaochishewechuch Creek, the Kakaskutatakuch River flows over 31.3 kilometres (19.4 mi) divided in the following segments:

- 19.7 kilometres (12.2 mi) north, then south-east, circling the west and north of a mountain whose summit reaches 311 metres (1,020 ft);
- 2.3 kilometres (1.4 mi) northerly to Pisimwetach Creek Kayspaick (coming from the West);
- 0.8 kilometres (0.50 mi) north-east to a forest road;
- 8.5 kilometres (5.3 mi) easterly, then snaking north to mouth.

The Kakaskutatakuch River flows into a river bend on the south shore of the Iskaskunikaw River. From there, the current flows northward to the Pauschikushish Ewiwach River, which flows northwest and then to the northeast, and empties into the South shore of Dana Lake (Eeyou Istchee Baie-James) which flows into a bay on the west bank of Evans Lake.

The mouth of the Kakaskutatakuch River is located at:

- 18.2 kilometres (11.3 mi) Southwest of the mouth of the Pauschikushish Ewiwach River;
- 42.3 kilometres (26.3 mi) from the mouth of Dana Lake (Eeyou Istchee Baie-James);
- 23.6 kilometres (14.7 mi) Southwest of the mouth of Evans Lake
- 27.3 kilometres (17.0 mi) North of Soscumica Lake;
- 133.6 kilometres (83.0 mi) Southeast of the mouth of the Broadback River;
- 91.5 kilometres (56.9 mi) North of downtown of Matagami.

== Toponymy ==
Of Cree origin, the toponym "Kakaskutatakuch brook" means: ‘’the brook with beetles".

The toponym "Kakaskutatakuch River" was formalized on October 5, 1982, at the Commission de toponymie du Québec.

== See also ==
- James Bay
- Rupert Bay
- Broadback River, a watercourse
- Evans Lake, a body of water
- Dana Lake (Eeyou Istchee Baie-James), a body of water
- Pauschikushish Ewiwach River
- Iskaskunikaw River
- List of rivers of Quebec
