= Théodat River =

Théodat
- Watershed of Nottaway River

Location
- Country: Canada
- Province: Quebec
- Region: Eeyou Istchee Baie-James (municipality)

Physical characteristics
- Source: Forested lake
  - location: Eeyou Istchee Baie-James (municipality), Nord-du-Québec, Quebec
  - coordinates: 50°50′02″N 76°34′50″W
  - elevation: 317 m (1,040 ft)
- Mouth: Evans Lake
  - location: Eeyou Istchee Baie-James (municipality), Nord-du-Québec, Quebec
  - coordinates: 50°59′19″N 76°34′50″W
  - elevation: 241 m (791 ft)
- Length: 117.4 km (72.9 mi)

The Théodat River is a tributary of Evans Lake, in Regional County Municipality (MRC) of Eeyou Istchee Baie-James (municipality), in the administrative region from Nord-du-Québec, Canadian province of Quebec, in Canada.

The hydrographic slope of the Théodat River is served by the northern route from Matagami passing 64 kilometres (40 mi) south-west of the mouth of the river. The surface of the river is usually frozen from early November to mid-May, however, safe ice circulation is generally from mid-November to mid-April.

== Geography ==
The main hydrographic slopes near the Théodat River are:

- North side: Poles River, La Marte River, Nemiscau River, Le Gardeur Lake;
- East side: Broadback River, Assinica River;
- South side: Salamandre River, Broadback River, Nipukatasi River;
- West side: Evans Lake, Broadback River, Chabinoche River.

The Theodat River originates at the mouth of a little unidentified lake (length: 0.6 kilometres (0.37 mi) altitude: 317 metres (1,040 ft)). This source is located at:

- 64.4 kilometres (40.0 mi) Northeast of the mouth of the Théodat River;
- 84.6 kilometres (52.6 mi) Northeast of the mouth of Evans Lake;
- 132.6 kilometres (82.4 mi) Northeast of Soscumica Lake;
- 228 kilometres (142 mi) East of the mouth of the Broadback River);
- 182 kilometres (113 mi) Northeast of downtown Matagami.

From its source, the Théodat River flows on 117.4 kilometres (72.9 mi) according to the following segments:

Upper part of Theodat River (segment of 50.1 kilometres (31.1 mi) crossing the Assinica Wildlife Sanctuary)

- 7.4 kilometres (4.6 mi) southwesterly to the East shore of Hobier Lake;
- 7.9 kilometres (4.9 mi) Westward across Hobier Lake (length: 8.9 kilometres (5.5 mi); altitude: 312 metres (1,024 ft)) to its mouth;
- 2.6 kilometres (1.6 mi) Northeast, to a creek (coming from the East);
- 10.1 kilometres (6.3 mi) West, to the outlet (coming from the South) of an unidentified lake;
- 5.5 kilometres (3.4 mi) Westerly, to the discharge (coming from the North) of an unidentified lake;
- 8.2 kilometres (5.1 mi) Northwesterly to the dump (coming from the East) of an unidentified lake;
- 3.7 kilometres (2.3 mi) to the West, to the East bank of an unidentified lake;
- 4.7 kilometres (2.9 mi) to the North, in particular by crossing on an unidentified lake 2.2 kilometres (1.4 mi) (altitude: 283 metres (928 ft)) at the beginning of the segment, up to a small bay on the South shore of the Eastern part of Théodat Lake;

Lower part of Théodat River (segment of 67.3 kilometres (41.8 mi))

- 18.6 kilometres (11.6 mi) Westerly across the Théodat Lake (length: 20.1 kilometres (12.5 mi); altitude: 283 metres (928 ft)), up to at the dam at its mouth;
- 11.6 kilometres (7.2 mi) West through marsh areas, forming a curve to the North and a Southwesterly hook at the end of the segment, to the East shore of an unidentified lake;
- 7.1 kilometres (4.4 mi) Westward, crossing at the beginning of the segment on an unidentified lake (altitude: 261 metres (856 ft)) up to at the end of a bay on the South shore of Le Gardeur Lake;
- 9.2 kilometres (5.7 mi) Northwesterly across Le Gardeur Lake (length: 16.0 kilometres (9.9 mi); altitude: 254 metres (833 ft)), up to its mouth;
- 4.8 kilometres (3.0 mi) North crossing over a small unidentified lake to its mouth.

The Theodat River flows into the Northeast bay of Evans Lake, facing an island with a length of 1.1 kilometres (0.68 mi). Evans Lake is crossed to the North by the Broadback River.

The mouth of Théodat River is located at:

- 20.2 kilometres (12.6 mi) East of the mouth of Evans Lake (confluence with the Broadback River);
- 96.9 kilometres (60.2 mi) Northeast of Soscumica Lake;
- 162.5 kilometres (101.0 mi) East of the mouth of the Broadback River;
- 155.6 kilometres (96.7 mi) North of downtown Matagami.

== Toponymy ==
The toponym "Théodat River" was formalized on December 5, 1968, at the Commission de toponymie du Québec, i.e. at the creation of this commission

== See also ==
- James Bay
- Rupert Bay
- Broadback River, a watercourse
- Evans Lake, a body of water
- Théodat Lake, a body of water
- Assinica Wildlife Sanctuary, a protected area
- List of rivers of Quebec
