= Iskaskunikaw River =

Iskaskunikaw
- Watershed of Nottaway River

Location
- Country: Canada
- Province: Quebec
- Region: Eeyou Istchee Baie-James (municipality)

Physical characteristics
- Source: Iskaskunikau Lake
  - location: Eeyou Istchee Baie-James (municipality), Nord-du-Québec, Quebec
  - coordinates: 50°30′34″N 77°16′15″W
  - elevation: 275 m (902 ft)
- Mouth: Pauschikushish Ewiwach River
  - location: Eeyou Istchee Baie-James (municipality), Nord-du-Québec, Quebec
  - coordinates: 50°35′27″N 77°25′48″W
  - elevation: 251 m (823 ft)
- Length: 27.4 km (17.0 mi)

Basin features
- Tributaries
  - left: Kakaskutatakuch River

The Iskaskunikaw River is a tributary of the Pauschikushish Ewiwach River in Regional County Municipality (RCM) of Eeyou Istchee James Bay (municipality), in the administrative region of Nord-du-Québec, Canadian province of Quebec, Canada.

The Iskaskunikaw River hydrographic slope is served by the northern route from Matagami to 3.0 kilometres (1.9 mi) South of the mouth of the head lake of the Iskaskunikaw River. The surface of the river is usually frozen from early November to mid-May, however, safe ice circulation is generally from mid-November to mid-April.

== Geography ==
The main hydrographic slopes near the Iskaskunikaw River are:

- North side: Dana Lake (Eeyou Istchee Baie-James), Du Tast Lake;
- East side: Pauschikushish Ewiwach River, Enistustikweyach River, Evans Lake, Broadback River;
- South side: Muskiki River, Nottaway River, Lake Soscumica;
- West side: Kakaskutatakuch River, Takutachun Creek Kakuskwapiminakuch, Dusaux Lake, Nottaway River.

The Iskaskunikaw River originates at the mouth of Iskaskunikau Lake (elevation: 275 metres (902 ft)) located at:

- 22.2 kilometres (13.8 mi) South of a bay on the South shore of Evans Lake;
- 6.7 kilometres (4.2 mi) Southeast of the mouth of the Iskaskunikaw River;
- 26.2 kilometres (16.3 mi) Southeast of the mouth of the Pauschikushish Ewiwach River;
- 45.3 kilometres (28.1 mi) South of the mouth of Dana Lake (Eeyou Istchee Baie-James);
- 870 kilometres (540 mi) North of downtown of Matagami.

Beginning at the confluence of Kaochishewechuch Creek, the "Iskaskunikaw River" flows over a length of 27.4 kilometres (17.0 mi) according to the following segments:

- 12.0 kilometres (7.5 mi) Northwesterly through marsh areas to a stream (from the south);
- 11.9 kilometres (7.4 mi) Northwesterly to the Kakaskutatakuch River (coming from the Southwest);
- 3.5 kilometres (2.2 mi) North to mouth.

The Iskaskunikaw River flows to the South bank of the Pauschikushish Ewiwach River. From there, the current flows to the northwest, then to the northeast, and flows to the South shore of Dana Lake (Eeyou Istchee Baie-James), which empties into a bay on the West bank of Evans Lake.

The mouth of the Iskaskunikaw River is located at:

- 16.7 kilometres (10.4 mi) Southwest of the mouth of the Pauschikushish Ewiwach River;
- 41.4 kilometres (25.7 mi) from the mouth of Dana Lake (Eeyou Istchee Baie-James);
- 63.8 kilometres (39.6 mi) Southwest of the mouth of Evans Lake
- 28.0 kilometres (17.4 mi) North of Soscumica Lake;
- 133.1 kilometres (82.7 mi) Southeast of the mouth of the Broadback River;
- 93.3 kilometres (58.0 mi) North of downtown Matagami.

== Toponymy ==
Of Cree origin, the toponym "Iskaskunikaw River" means: "the river that surrounds a wooden cache".

The toponym "Iskaskunikaw River" was formalized on October 5, 1982 at the Commission de toponymie du Québec

== See also ==
- James Bay
- Rupert Bay
- Broadback River, a watercourse
- Evans Lake, a body of water
- Dana Lake (Eeyou Istchee Baie-James), a body of water
- Pauschikushish Ewiwach River
- List of rivers of Quebec
