= Kauskatitineu River =

Kauskatitineu
- Watershed of Nottaway River

Location
- Country: Canada
- Province: Quebec
- Region: Eeyou Istchee Baie-James (municipality)

Physical characteristics
- Source: Forested creek
  - location: Eeyou Istchee Baie-James (municipality), Nord-du-Québec, Quebec
  - coordinates: 50°52′50″N 77°34′32″W
  - elevation: 264 m (866 ft)
- Mouth: Du Tast Lake
  - location: Eeyou Istchee Baie-James (municipality), Nord-du-Québec, Quebec
  - coordinates: 50°58′51″N 77°24′45″W
  - elevation: 242 m (794 ft)
- Length: 24.2 km (15.0 mi)

The Kauskatitineu River is a tributary of Du Tast Lake, in Regional County Municipality (RCM) of Eeyou Istchee Baie-James (municipality), in the administrative region of Nord-du-Québec, in the Canadian province of Quebec, in Canada.

The hydrographic slope of the Kauskatitineu River is served on the West side by the northern route from Matagami. The surface of the river is usually frozen from early November to mid-May, however, safe ice circulation is generally from mid-November to mid-April.

== Geography ==
The main hydrographic slopes near the Kauskatitineu River are:

- North side: Columbus Lake, Broadback River, Rupert River, Du Tast Lake;
- East side: Dana Lake (Eeyou Istchee Baie-James), Iyinu Kaniput River, Evans Lake, Broadback River;
- South side: Matawawaskweyau River, Muskiki River, Nottaway River, Soscumica Lake;
- West side: Chabouillié Lake, Rodayer Lake, Dusaux Lake, Nottaway River.

The Kauskatitineu River originates from a forest stream (elevation: 264 metres (866 ft)) located at:

- 15.9 kilometres (9.9 mi) Southwest of the mouth of the Kauskatitineu River;
- 25.0 kilometres (15.5 mi) Northeast of a curve of the Nottaway River;
- 61.3 kilometres (38.1 mi) Northwest of Soscumica Lake;
- 22.0 kilometres (13.7 mi) Southwest of the mouth of Lake Tast (Eeyou Istchee James Bay)] (confluence with Dana Lake (Eeyou Istchee Baie-James));
- 30.7 kilometres (19.1 mi) Southwest of the mouth of Dana Lake (Eeyou Istchee Baie-James);
- 124.3 kilometres (77.2 mi) North of downtown Matagami.

From its source, the Kauskatitineu River flows on 24.2 kilometres (15.0 mi) according to the following segments:

- 4.0 kilometres (2.5 mi) Eastward, forming a curve to the South, to a creek (coming from the South);
- 20.2 kilometres (12.6 mi) northeasterly by collecting several streams on its left bank and crossing some marsh areas to its mouth.

The Kauskatitineu River flows into a bay on the west shore of Du Tast Lake. This lake in turn drains into Dana Lake (Eeyou Istchee Baie-James) which empties into a bay west of Evans Lake; this last stretch of water is crossed to the North by the Broadback River.

The mouth of the Kauskatitineu River is located at:

- 7.1 kilometres (4.4 mi) Southwest of the mouth of Du Tast Lake;
- 20.6 kilometres (12.8 mi) Southwest of the mouth of Dana Lake (Eeyou Istchee Baie-James);
- 39.1 kilometres (24.3 mi) Southwest of the mouth of Evans Lake
- 71.7 kilometres (44.6 mi) North of Lake Soscumica;
- 107.1 kilometres (66.5 mi) Southeast of the mouth of the Broadback River;

North of downtown Matagami.

== Toponymy ==
Of Cree origin, the toponym "Kauskatitineu river" means: "the river where there are young branches".

The toponym "Kauskatitineu River" was formalized on October 5, 1982, at the Commission de toponymie du Québec

== See also ==
- James Bay
- Rupert Bay
- Broadback River, a watercourse
- Evans Lake, a body of water
- Dana Lake (Eeyou Istchee Baie-James), a body of water
- Du Tast Lake, a body of water
- List of rivers of Quebec
