= Louvart River =

River in Nord-du-Québec, Quebec, Canada

Louvart
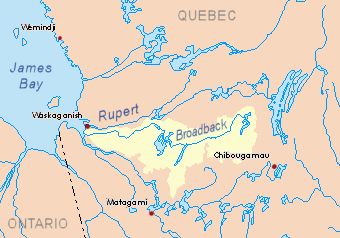
- Watershed of Broadback River

Location
- Country: Canada
- Province: Quebec
- Region: Nord-du-Québec

Physical characteristics
- Source: Malsain Lake
  - location: Eeyou Istchee Baie-James (municipalité), Nord-du-Québec, Jamésie, Quebec
  - coordinates: 50°51′16″N 77°57′03″W
  - elevation: 214 m (702 ft)
- Mouth: Lepallier River
  - location: Eeyou Istchee Baie-James (municipalité), Nord-du-Québec, Jamésie, Quebec
  - coordinates: 50°55′48″N 78°02′48″W
  - elevation: 179 m (587 ft)
- Length: 14.4 km (8.9 mi)

The Louvart River is a tributary of the south shore of the Lepallier River flowing into the municipality of Eeyou Istchee Baie-James (municipality), in the administrative region of Nord-du-Québec, in Quebec, in Canada.

The course of the Louvart River is located southwest of James Bay Reserve.

A winter forest road (North-South direction) passes to 8.8 kilometres (5.5 mi) on the east side of Louvart Lake, between Chaboullié Lake and Rodayer Lake. This road is more or less parallel to the west side of the James Bay main road from Matagami and further north.

The surface of the Louvart River is usually frozen from early November to mid-May, however, safe ice circulation is generally from mid-November to mid-April.

== Geography ==
The surrounding hydrographic slopes of the Louvart River are:
- North side: Broadback River, Lepallier River / Kwatkaakutech Creek;
- East side: Wemistikushiiuch Creek, Chaboullié Lake, Louvart Lake, Rodayer Lake, Pauschikushish Ewiwach River;
- South side: Nottaway River, Chechekw Creek, Dusaux Lake;
- West side: Nottaway River, Kitchigama River.

This hydrographic slope has its source at Louvart Lake (length: 7.5 kilometres (4.7 mi); altitude: 214 metres (702 ft)). The mouth of this lake is located at 6.3 kilometres (3.9 mi) north-east of the Nottaway River, at 14.6 kilometres (9.1 mi) west of Rodayer Lake (elevation): 250 metres (820 ft)) (which is the head lake of the Lepallier River) and at 63.1 kilometres (39.2 mi) west of Evans Lake.

The Louvart River begins at the mouth of Louvart Lake and flows more or less parallel (on the north side) to the Nottaway River. The Louvart River flows northwest between the Nottaway (located to the south) and the Broadback River (located to the north). From Louvart Lake, the current flows over the northwest to the south bank of the Lepallier River. The latter is a tributary of the south shore of the Broadback River which flows west to the Rupert Bay, located south of James Bay.

== Toponymy ==
The toponym Louvart River was formalized on December 5, 1968 at the Commission de toponymie du Québec, at the creation of this commission.

== See also ==
- Rupert Bay
- James Bay
- Broadback River
- Lepallier River
- Eeyou Istchee James Bay (municipality)
- James Bay
- List of rivers of Quebec
