= Théodat Lake =

Lake in Quebec, Canada

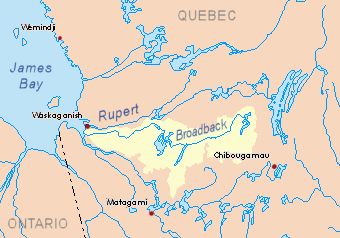
- Broadback River basin in yellow

- Location within Quebec
- Location: Baie-James
- Coordinates: 50°54′26″N 76°09′13″W
- Type: Natural
- Primary inflows: Théodat River
- Primary outflows: Théodat River
- Basin countries: Canada
- Max. length: 20.1 kilometres (12.5 mi)
- Max. width: 8.0 kilometres (5.0 mi)
- Surface elevation: 283 metres (928 ft)
- Islands: 43

The Théodat Lake is a freshwater body of the territory of Eeyou Istchee Baie-James (municipality), in the administrative region of Nord-du-Québec, in the province of Quebec, in Canada.

The hydrographic slope of Lake Theodat is accessible through the forest road from Matagami which passes on the west side of Evans Lake. The surface of the lake is generally frozen from early November to mid-May, however safe ice circulation is generally from mid-November to mid-April.

== Geography ==
This lake has a length of 20.1 kilometres (12.5 mi). Its outline is in the form of a lying anchor, a maximum width of 8.0 kilometres (5.0 mi) and an altitude of 283 metres (928 ft).

Lake Theodat has many bays, peninsulas and about 43 islands. The Theodat lake is crossed to the West by the Théodat River. Lake Theodat is supplied in its eastern part by the discharge of the Théodat River, by a discharge (coming from the East) of lakes and by another discharge (coming from the North) draining a zone of marsh.

The mouth of this lake Théodat discharges towards the West to join Le Gardeur Lake. The mouth of Theodat Lake is located at the bottom of a bay on the West bank, at:

- 22.2 kilometres (13.8 mi) East of the mouth of the Théodat River;
- 158 kilometres (98 mi) Northeast of downtown Matagami;
- 100 kilometres (62 mi) Northeast of Soscumica Lake.

The main hydrographic slopes near Lake Théodat are:

- North side: Legoff Lake, Marte River, Nemiscau River;
- East side: Lake Tésécau, Lake Camousichouane;
- South side: Broadback River, Salamandre River, Nipukatasi River;
- West side: Evans Lake, Chabinoche River.

== Toponymy ==
Several designations of this body of water have been known since the beginning of the 20th century. The map of the province of Quebec (1911) by James White, accompanying the ninth report of the Geographical Survey of Canada, refers to this waterbody "L. Geikie", of unknown origin. The "Dictionary of Rivers and Lakes of the Province of Quebec" (edition of 1914) uses the designation "Lake Geikie" under the heading "Mill River" (today Théodat). The 1925 edition of the same book designates this lake as "Lake Eikie".

In addition, maps of the southern Quebec leaflet published in 1924 and 1935 by the Department of Lands and Forests and, in 1940, by the Ministry of Lands and Forests, Hunting and Fishing, identify this water body "L. Mill". The 1933 and 1941 editions of the map of the Abitibi and Mistassini Territories published by the Department of Lands and Forests, designate this lake "Mishagomish Lake", Cree origin name meaning "large expanse of water" .

In 1945, the Geography Commission announced its intention to choose a definitive name to designate the water body and also the river, noting that the new name could be none of those then known. Even francified in the form Michagomiche, the aboriginal toponym remained a problematic choice given names of the same root used in the same region as this lake.

Two years later, the Geography Commission attributes the term Theodat to the lake and its emissary. Theodatus evokes the life work of Gabriel Sagard, who baptized Théodat, recollet brother and missionary in Huronie in 1623 and 1624. He was born between 1590 and 1595 and died in France around 1636. Honest and sure witness of his time he recorded his observations in "The Great Voyage of the Huron Country" (1632), in his "Histoire du Canada" (1636) and in a "Dictionary of the Huron Language". He is considered as the first religious historian of Canada.

The toponym "Lake Théodat" was officialized on December 5, 1968, by the Commission de toponymie du Québec, when it was created.

== See also ==
- James Bay
- Rupert Bay
- Broadback River, a watercourse
- Evans Lake, a body of water
- Eeyou Istchee Baie-James (municipality), a municipality
- List of lakes in Canada
