= Poles River =

Poles "Rivière des Pôles" (in French)
- Watershed of Nottaway River

Location
- Country: Canada
- Province: Quebec
- Region: Eeyou Istchee Baie-James (municipality)

Physical characteristics
- Source: Unidentified lake
  - location: Eeyou Istchee Baie-James (municipality), Nord-du-Québec, Quebec
  - coordinates: 51°05′54″N 76°22′47″W
  - elevation: 268 m (879 ft)
- Mouth: Evans Lake
  - location: Eeyou Istchee Baie-James (municipality), Nord-du-Québec, Quebec
  - coordinates: 51°01′08″N 76°37′35″W
  - elevation: 241 m (791 ft)
- Length: 30.3 km (18.8 mi)

The Poles River is a tributary of Evans Lake in Regional County Municipality (RCM) of Eeyou Istchee Baie-James (municipality) in the area of the Nord-du-Québec, Canadian province of Quebec, in Canada.

The hydrographic slope of Pôles River is not served by a carriageway. The northern route from Matagami passes West of Evans Lake, which is 66.9 kilometres (41.6 mi) north-west of the mouth of the Pôles River. The surface of the river is usually frozen from early November to mid-May, however, safe ice circulation is generally from mid-November to mid-April.

== Geography ==
The main hydrographic slopes near the Pôles River are:

- North side: La Marte river, Nemiscau river;
- East side: Théodat Lake, Tésécau Lake;
- South side: Le Gardeur Lake, Salamandre River, Broadback River, Nipukatasi River;
- West side: Evans Lake, Rabbit Creek, Chabinoche River.

The Poles River originates at the mouth of an unidentified lake (length: 3.2 kilometres (2.0 mi) altitude: 268 metres (879 ft)). This source is located at:

- 19.4 kilometres (12.1 mi) North of the mouth of the Pôles River;
- 34.3 kilometres (21.3 mi) North of the mouth of Evans Lake;
- 112 kilometres (70 mi) Northeast of Lake Soscumica;
- 174 kilometres (108 mi) East of the mouth of the Broadback River);
- 173 kilometres (107 mi) Northeast of downtown Matagami.

From its source, the "Rivière des Pôles" (English: Poles River) flows on 30.3 kilometres (18.8 mi) according to the following segments:

- 5.4 kilometres (3.4 mi) southwesterly in a marsh zone to the outlet of Lake Michisu (coming from the northwest);
- 13.1 kilometres (8.1 mi) southwesterly through marsh areas to the outlet of a lake (from the south);
- 11.8 kilometres (7.3 mi) westerly across marsh areas at the end of the segment to its mouth.

The Poles River flows to the bottom of the northeast bay of Evans Lake, facing an island with a length of 1.1 kilometres (0.68 mi). Evans Lake is crossed to the North by the Broadback River.

The mouth of the Pôles River is located at:

- 16.4 kilometres (10.2 mi) Northeast of the mouth of Evans Lake (confluence with Broadback River);
- 94.8 kilometres (58.9 mi) Northeast of Soscumica Lake;
- 158.5 kilometres (98.5 mi) East of the mouth of the Broadback River;
- 156.9 kilometres (97.5 mi) North of downtown Matagami.

== Toponymy ==
The toponym "Rivière des Pôles" was made official on December 5, 1968, at the Commission de toponymie du Québec, i.e. at the creation of this commission

== See also ==
- James Bay
- Rupert Bay
- Broadback River, a watercourse
- Evans Lake, a body of water
- List of rivers of Quebec
