= Matawawaskweyau River =

Matawawaskweyau
- Watershed of Nottaway River

Location
- Country: Canada
- Province: Quebec
- Region: Eeyou Istchee Baie-James (municipality)

Physical characteristics
- Source: Confluence of Kachishewechuch creek
  - location: Eeyou Istchee Baie-James (municipality), Nord-du-Québec, Quebec
  - coordinates: 50°40′42″N 77°36′20″W
  - elevation: 243 m (797 ft)
- Mouth: Pauschikushish Ewiwach River
  - location: Eeyou Istchee Baie-James (municipality), Nord-du-Québec, Quebec
  - coordinates: 50°41′25″N 77°30′36″W
  - elevation: 243 m (797 ft)
- Length: 9.9 km (6.2 mi)

The Matawawaskweyau River is a tributary of the Pauschikushish Ewiwach River in Regional County Municipality (RCM) of Eeyou Istchee James Bay (municipality), in the administrative region of Nord-du-Québec, Canadian province of Quebec, in Canada.

The Matawawaskweyau River hydrographic slope is served by the Northern Highway from Matagami to 1.3 kilometres (0.81 mi) west of the source of the Matawawaskweyau River. The surface of the river is usually frozen from early November to mid-May, however, safe ice circulation is generally from mid-November to mid-April.

== Geography ==
The main hydrographic slopes near the Matawawaskweyau River are:

- North side: Kapitastikweyach Creek, Desorsons Lake, Kauskatitineu River, Utamikaneu River;
- East side: Pauschikushish Ewiwach River, Kapisaukanew Creek, Dana Lake (Eeyou Istchee Baie-James), Evans Lake;
- South side: Kauskatistin Creek, Nottaway River, Soscumica Lake;
- West side: Dusaux Lake, Nottaway River, Davoust River.

The Matawawaskweyau River originates at the confluence of Kaochishewechuch Creek (elevation: 302 metres (991 ft)) located at:

- 2.0 kilometres (1.2 mi) northwest of the top of Waseyapiskatinach Hill Useyapiskau (elevation: 297 metres (974 ft));
- 32.5 kilometres (20.2 mi) southwest of Evans Lake;
- 7.6 kilometres (4.7 mi) south-west of the mouth of the Matawawaskweyau River;
- 18.6 kilometres (11.6 mi) south-west of the mouth of the Pauschikushish Ewiwach River;
- 42.3 kilometres (26.3 mi) southeast of the mouth of Dana Lake (Eeyou Istchee Baie-James);
- 101.5 kilometres (63.1 mi) north of downtown Matagami.

From the confluence of Kaochishewechuch Creek, the "Matawawaskweyau River" flows over 9.9 kilometres (6.2 mi) according to the following segments:

- 5.1 kilometres (3.2 mi) Eastward generally in marsh zone, up to Kapitastikweyach Creek (coming from the Northeast);
- 4.8 kilometres (3.0 mi) East across marsh areas to mouth.

The "Matawawaskweyau River" flows on the north shore of the Pauschikushish Ewiwach River. From there, the current flows to the northeast and flows to the south shore of [Dana Lake (Eeyou Istchee James Bay)] which empties into a bay west of Evans Lake.

The mouth of the Matawawaskweyau River is located at:

- 11.4 kilometres (7.1 mi) south-west of the mouth of the Matawawaskweyau River;
- 35.6 kilometres (22.1 mi) south-west of the mouth of Dana Lake (Eeyou Istchee Baie-James);
- 59.6 kilometres (37.0 mi) Southwest of the mouth of Evans Lake
- 40.1 kilometres (24.9 mi) north of Soscumica Lake;
- 117.6 kilometres (73.1 mi) south-east of the mouth of the Broadback River;
- 103.6 kilometres (64.4 mi) North of downtown Matagami.

== Toponymy ==
Of Cree origin, the toponym "Matawawaskweyau River" means: "the river where we find rocks of many forms".

The toponym "rivière Matawawaskweyau" was formalized on April 7, 1983 at the Commission de toponymie du Québec

== See also ==
- James Bay
- Rupert Bay
- Broadback River, a watercourse
- Evans Lake, a body of water
- Dana Lake (Eeyou Istchee Baie-James), a body of water
- Pauschikushish Ewiwach River
- List of rivers of Quebec
