= Utamikaneu River =

Utamikaneu
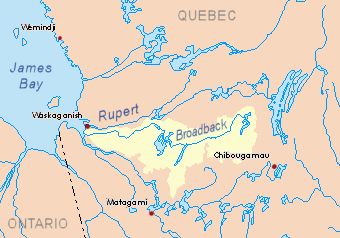
- Watershed of Broadback River

Location
- Country: Canada
- Province: Quebec
- Region: Eeyou Istchee Baie-James (municipality)

Physical characteristics
- Source: Utamikaneu Lake
  - location: Eeyou Istchee Baie-James (municipality), Nord-du-Québec, Quebec
  - coordinates: 50°52′17″N 77°34′56″W
  - elevation: 262 m (860 ft)
- Mouth: Broadback River
  - location: Eeyou Istchee Baie-James (municipality), Nord-du-Québec, Quebec
  - coordinates: 50°59′19″N 76°34′50″W
  - elevation: 241 m (791 ft)
- Length: 24.0 km (14.9 mi)

The Utamikaneu River is a tributary of Dana Lake (Eeyou Istchee Baie-James), in Regional County Municipality (MRC) of Eeyou Istchee Baie-James (municipality), in the administrative region of Nord-du-Québec, in the Canadian province of Quebec, in Canada.

The hydrographic slope of the Utamikaneu River is served by the northern route from Matagami to 2.9 kilometres (1.8 mi) west of the source of the Utamikaneu River. The surface of the river is usually frozen from early November to mid-May, however, safe ice circulation is generally from mid-November to mid-April.

== Geography ==
The main hydrographic slopes near the Utamikaneu River are:

- North side: Kauskatitineu River, Broadback River, Ouasouagami River;
- East side: Dana Lake (Eeyou Istchee Baie-James), Evans Lake, Broadback River;
- South side: Matawawaskweyau River, Pauschikushish Ewiwach River, Kapitastikweyack Creek;
- West side: Dodayer Lake, Desorsons Lake, Chaboullié Lake, Wemistikushiiuch Kawichitwaw Creek, Nottaway River.

The Utamikaneu River originates at the mouth of Utamikaneu Lake (length: altitude: 262 metres (860 ft)). This source is located at:

- 10.7 kilometres (6.6 mi) West of the mouth of the Utamikaneu River (confluence with Dana Lake (Eeyou Istchee Baie-James);
- 31.2 kilometres (19.4 mi) Southwest of the mouth of Dana Lake (Eeyou Istchee Baie-James) (confluence with Evans Lake);
- 53.8 kilometres (33.4 mi) Southwest of the confluence of Evans Lake;
- 60.0 kilometres (37.3 mi) Northwest of Lake Soscumica;
- 103 kilometres (64 mi) East of the mouth of the Broadback River);
- 123.3 kilometres (76.6 mi) North of downtown Matagami.

From his source, the "Utamikaneu River" flows on 24.0 kilometres (14.9 mi) according to the following segments:

- 10.2 kilometres (6.3 mi) Southeast to a creek (coming from the southwest);
- 9.2 kilometres (5.7 mi) Northeast to a creek (coming from the north);
- 4.6 kilometres (2.9 mi) Easterly to its mouth.

The "Utamikaneu River" flows into the bottom of the West Bank Bay of Dana Lake (Eeyou Istchee Baie-James). The latter flows to the west shore of Evans Lake which is crossed to the North by the Broadback River.

The mouth of the Utamikaneu River is located at:

- 14.1 kilometres (8.8 mi) Southwest of the mouth of Dana Lake (Eeyou Istchee Baie-James).
- 38.3 kilometres (23.8 mi) Southwest of the mouth of Evans Lake (confluence with Broadback River);
- 61 kilometres (38 mi) North of Lake Soscumica;
- 111.7 kilometres (69.4 mi) East of the mouth of the Broadback River;
- 123.3 kilometres (76.6 mi) North of downtown Matagami

== Toponymy ==
Of Cree origin, this hydronym means the river of the cheek.

The toponym "Utamikaneu River" was formalized on October 5, 1982, at the Commission de toponymie du Québec

== See also ==
- James Bay
- Broadback River, a watercourse
- Evans Lake, a body of water
- Dana Lake (Eeyou Istchee Baie-James), a body of water
- List of rivers of Quebec
