= Natchiowatchouan River =

Natchiowatchouan
- Watershed of Nottaway River

Location
- Country: Canada
- Province: Quebec
- Region: Eeyou Istchee Baie-James (municipality)

Physical characteristics
- Source: Forested creek
  - location: Eeyou Istchee Baie-James (municipality), Nord-du-Québec, Quebec
  - coordinates: 50°02′59″N 77°35′42″W
  - elevation: 265 m (869 ft)
- Mouth: Nottaway River
  - location: Eeyou Istchee Baie-James (municipality), Nord-du-Québec, Quebec
  - coordinates: 50°10′28″N 77°30′41″W
  - elevation: 244 m (801 ft)

The Natchiowatchouan River is a tributary of the Nottaway River (via Lake Soscumica), in the administrative region of Nord-du-Québec, in the Canadian province of Quebec, in Canada. Most of the course of the river flows into Millet Township.

Forestry is the main economic activity of the sector. Recreational tourism (especially hunting and fishing) comes second, thanks to the navigable water body of Lake Soscumica, including the tributaries.

The hydrographic slope of Lake Soscumica is accessible via the James Bay Highway (North-South direction) to 22.8 kilometres (14.2 mi) to the East. The west side of the lake is served by a winter road (North-South direction). The surface of the river is usually frozen from early November to mid-May, however, safe ice circulation is generally from mid-November to mid-April.

== Geography ==
The main neighboring hydrographic slopes are:

- North side: Lake Soscumica, Nottaway River;
- East side: Lake Soscumica, Nottaway River;
- South side: Matagami Lake, Nottaway River, Bell River;
- West side: Deux Lacs River, Lake Montreuil, Kitchigama River.

From its source, the Natchiowatchouan River flows over 29.3 kilometres (18.2 mi) according to the following segments:

- 6.5 kilometres (4.0 mi) to the North, then to the Southwest, to a creek (coming from the South);
- 6.3 kilometres (3.9 mi) northerly to the mouth of a lake that the current flows over 0.9 kilometres (0.56 mi) to the northeast;
- 8.9 kilometres (5.5 mi) northeasterly to the Millet township boundary;
- 5.3 kilometres (3.3 mi) Northeast in the canton of Millet, to the limit of the cantons;
- 1.5 kilometres (0.93 mi) to the North, to the outlet of a lake (coming from the North-West);
- 0.8 kilometres (0.50 mi) southeasterly to its mouth.

The Natchiowatchouan River empties onto the western shore of Soscumica Lake. This confluence is located at:

- 23.3 kilometres (14.5 mi) Southeast of the mouth of Lake Soscumica;
- 162 kilometres (101 mi) Southeast of the mouth of the Nottaway River (confluence with Rupert Bay);
- 46.4 kilometres (28.8 mi) North of downtown Matagami, Quebec;
- 14.6 kilometres (9.1 mi) North of the mouth of the Matagami Lake.

== Toponymy ==
The toponym "Natchiowatchouan" was formalized on December 5, 1968, at the Commission de toponymie du Québec, i.e. at the creation of this commission

== See also ==
- James Bay
- Rupert Bay
- Nottaway River
- Lake Soscumica
- List of rivers of Quebec
