= Chabinoche River =

Chibinoche
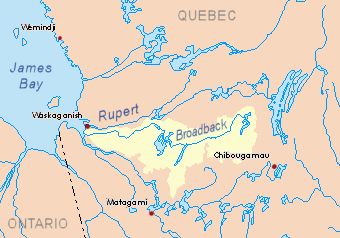
- Watershed of Broadback River

Location
- Country: Canada
- Province: Quebec
- Region: Eeyou Istchee Baie-James (municipality)

Physical characteristics
- Source: Chabinoche Lake
  - location: Eeyou Istchee Baie-James (municipality), Nord-du-Québec, Quebec
  - coordinates: 50°30′19″N 77°06′56″W
  - elevation: 276 m (906 ft)
- Mouth: Evans Lake, Broadback River
  - location: Eeyou Istchee Baie-James (municipality), Nord-du-Québec, Quebec
  - coordinates: 50°41′38″N 77°09′20″W
  - elevation: 241 m (791 ft)
- Length: 33.1 km (20.6 mi)

The Chabinoche River is a tributary of Evans Lake, in Eeyou Istchee Baie-James (municipality), in the administrative region of Nord-du-Québec, in the Canadian province of Quebec, in Canada.

The northern part of this hydrographic slope is served by a forest road from the south. The surface of the river is usually frozen from early November to mid-May, however, safe ice circulation is generally from mid-November to mid-April.

== Geography ==
The main neighboring hydrographic slopes are:

- North side: Evans Lake, Broadback River;
- East side: Salamandre River, Salamandre Lake, Quenonisca Lake;
- South side: Muskiki River, Soscumica Lake;
- West side: Iskaskunikaw River, Pauschikushish Ewiwach River, Kakaskutatakuch River.

The "Chabinoche River" has its source at the mouth of Lac Chabinoche (length: 5.2 kilometres (3.2 mi) altitude: 276 metres (906 ft)) located at:

- 31.1 kilometres (19.3 mi) north of Lake Soscumica;
- 92.6 kilometres (57.5 mi) north of downtown Matagami.

From the mouth of Lake Chabinoche, the "Chabinoche River" flows on 33.1 kilometres (20.6 mi) according to the following segments:

- 23.4 kilometres (14.5 mi) northerly forming a large curve to the east, to the south shore of Lake Ouagama;
- 5.7 kilometres (3.5 mi) to the north crossing Lake Ouagama (length: 6.3 kilometres (3.9 mi); altitude: 259 metres (850 ft));
- 4.0 kilometres (2.5 mi) north to the mouth of the river.

The "Chabinoche River" flows into the Southwest Bay bottoms on the southwestern shore of Evans Lake which is crossed by the Broadback River. This confluence is located at:

- 12.5 kilometres (7.8 mi) East of Dana Lake (Eeyou Istchee Baie-James);
- 45 kilometres (28 mi) North of Lake Soscumica;
- 42.8 kilometres (26.6 mi) South of the mouth of Evans Lake;
- 110 kilometres (68 mi) North of downtown Matagami.

== Toponymy ==
The toponym "Chabinoche River" was formalized on December 5, 1968, at the Commission de toponymie du Quebec, i.e. at the creation of this commission

== See also ==
- James Bay
- Rupert Bay
- Broadback River, a watercourse
- Evans Lake, a body of water
- List of rivers of Quebec
