= Enistustikweyach River =

Enistustikweyach
- Watershed of Nottaway River

Location
- Country: Canada
- Province: Quebec
- Region: Eeyou Istchee Baie-James (municipality)

Physical characteristics
- Source: Little unidentified lake
  - location: Eeyou Istchee Baie-James (municipality), Nord-du-Québec, Quebec
  - coordinates: 50°38′46″N 77°23′00″W
  - elevation: 253 m (830 ft)
- Mouth: Dana Lake (Eeyou Istchee Baie-James)
  - location: Eeyou Istchee Baie-James (municipality), Nord-du-Québec, Quebec
  - coordinates: 50°46′47″N 77°17′39″W
  - elevation: 241 m (791 ft)
- Length: 39.1 km (24.3 mi)

The Enistustikweyach River is a tributary of Dana Lake (Eeyou Istchee Baie-James) in Regional County Municipality (RCM) of Eeyou Istchee James Bay (municipality), in the administrative region of Nord-du-Québec, in the Canadian province of Quebec, in Canada.

The hydrographic side of the Enistustikweyach River does not have a nearby access road; however, the northern route from Matagami passes to 13.3 kilometres (8.3 mi) west of the source of the Enistustikweyach River. The surface of the river is usually frozen from early November to mid-May, however, safe circulation on ice is generally from mid-November to mid-April.

== Geography ==
The main neighboring hydrographic slopes are:

- North side: Dana Lake (Eeyou Istchee Baie-James), Du Tast Lake;
- East side: Evans Lake, Chabinoche River;
- South side: Iskaskunikau River, Pauschikushish Ewiwach River, Soscumica Lake;
- West side: Pauschikushish Ewiwach River, Matawawaskweyau River.

The Enistustikweyach River originates at the mouth of a small unidentified lake (elevation: 253 metres (830 ft)) surrounded by marsh and located at:

- 38.4 kilometres (23.9 mi) North of Soscumica Lake;
- 109.4 kilometres (68.0 mi) North of downtown Matagami;
- 7.2 kilometres (4.5 mi) East of Amikapish Hill.

From the mouth of Enistustikweyach Lake, the Enistustikweyach River flows on 39.1 kilometres (24.3 mi) according to the following segments:

- 12.1 kilometres (7.5 mi) Northeast to a bend in the river;
- 19.7 kilometres (12.2 mi) North to a creek (coming from the east);
- 2.4 kilometres (1.5 mi) westerly, forming a curve to the northeast, to a creek (coming from the Northeast);
- 4.9 kilometres (3.0 mi) southwesterly in a widening of the river to the mouth of the river

The "Enistustikweyach River" flows into the Southwest Bay bottoms on the southwestern shore of Evans Lake which is crossed by the Broadback River. This confluence is located at:

- 17.8 kilometres (11.1 mi) South of the mouth of Dana Lake (Eeyou Istchee Baie-James);
- 124.6 kilometres (77.4 mi) South of the mouth of the Broadback River;
- 50.5 kilometres (31.4 mi) north of Lake Soscumica;
- 41.4 kilometres (25.7 mi) south-west of the mouth of Evans Lake;
- 115.9 kilometres (72.0 mi) North of downtown Matagami.

== Toponymy ==
Of Cree origin, the term "Enistustikweyach" means "the river where three streams converge".

The toponym "Enistustikweyach River" was formalized on October 5, 1982 at the Commission de toponymie du Québec

== See also ==
- James Bay
- Rupert Bay
- Broadback River, a watercourse
- Evans Lake, a body of water
- Dana Lake (Eeyou Istchee Baie-James), a body of water
- List of rivers of Quebec
