= Dusaux Lake =

Freshwater body in Quebec, Canada

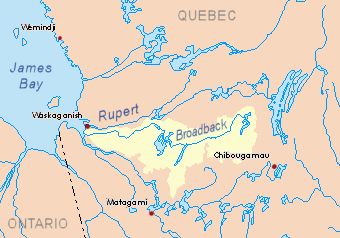
- Broadback River basin in yellow

- Location within Quebec
- Location: Baie-James
- Coordinates: 50°45′56″N 77°57′26″W
- Type: Natural
- Primary inflows: Nottaway River, Davoust River
- Primary outflows: Nottaway River
- Basin countries: Canada
- Max. length: 23.0 kilometres (14.3 mi)
- Max. width: 1.7 kilometres (1.1 mi)
- Surface area: 10.58 kilometres (6.57 mi)
- Surface elevation: 210 metres (690 ft)
- Islands: 16

Lake Dusaux is a freshwater body of the territory of Eeyou Istchee Baie-James (municipality), in the administrative region of Nord-du-Québec, in the province of Quebec, in Canada.

The Dusaux Lake hydrographic slope is accessible via the James Bay (north-south) road from Matagami to 10.4 kilometres (6.5 mi) on the East side of Lake Dusaux, and then going back north passing between Mouliers Lake and Katutupisisikanuch. The surface of the lake is generally frozen from early November to mid-May, however safe ice circulation is generally from mid-November to mid-April.

== Geography ==
This lake has a length of 23.0 kilometres (14.3 mi), a maximum width of 1.7 kilometres (1.1 mi) and an altitude of 283 metres (928 ft).

Lake Dusaux has 16 islands, the largest of which (Vandry Island) are located downstream. Lake Dusaux is crossed to the northwest by the Nottaway River.

Lake Dusaux begins at the foot of the Iroquois Falls in the Southeast that is fed by the Nottaway River, facing the Nestipuku Islands. This lake is also fed to the northeast by the Davoust River which empties in front of Michikushish Island. In the center of the lake, the current flows through the northwest in a zone of rapids bypassing the Desmolier Islands. Dusaux Lake terminates downstream of Vandry Island (length: 2.6 kilometres (1.6 mi)) which is shaped like a half-moon.

The mouth of this Lake Dusaux is located northwest, downstream of Vandry Island. Then the current of the Nottaway River will flow into Rupert Bay. The mouth of Lake Dusaux is located at:

- 79.3 kilometres (49.3 mi) Southeast of the mouth of the Nottaway River;
- 123.4 kilometres (76.7 mi) Northwest of downtown Matagami;
- 103.7 kilometres (64.4 mi) East of the Ontario boundary.

The main hydrographic slopes near Lake Dusaux are:

- North side: Chabouillié Lake, Davoust River, Colomb River;
- East side: Nottaway River, Dana Lake (Eeyou Istchee Baie-James), Pauschikushish Ewiwach River;
- South side: Nottaway River, Kitchigama River;
- West side: Nottaway River, Kitchigama River.

== Toponymy ==
The term "Dusaux", "Dussault" and "Dussaulx" are variants of the same surname of French origin.

The toponym "Lac Dusaux" was formalized on December 5, 1968, by the Commission de toponymie du Québec.

== See also ==
- James Bay
- Rupert Bay
- Broadback River, a watercourse
- Eeyou Istchee Baie-James (municipality), a municipality
- List of lakes in Canada
