= Davoust River =

Davoust
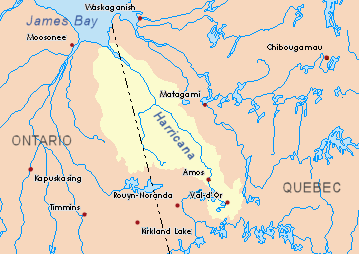

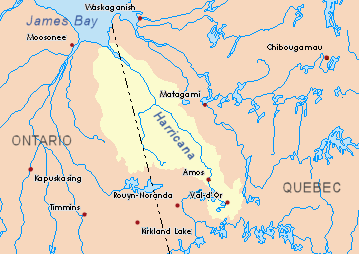
- Harricana River basin in yellow

Location
- Country: Canada
- Province: Quebec
- Region: Eeyou Istchee Baie-James (municipality)

Physical characteristics
- Source: Lake Mouilliers
  - location: Eeyou Istchee Baie-James (municipality), Nord-du-Québec, Quebec
  - coordinates: 50°44′54″N 79°52′00″W
  - elevation: 244 m (801 ft)
- Mouth: Nottaway River
  - location: Eeyou Istchee Baie-James (municipality), Nord-du-Québec, Quebec
  - coordinates: 50°44′54″N 77°52′00″W
  - elevation: 0 m (0 ft)
- Length: 19.8 km (12.3 mi)

The Davoust River is a tributary of the northeast shore of the Nottaway River, flowing into the municipality of Eeyou Istchee Baie-James (municipality), in the administrative region of Nord-du-Québec, in Quebec, in Canada.

The Davoust River flows entirely in the forest and marsh zone at the east of Lake Dusaux, which is crossed by the Nottaway River. The surface of the river is usually frozen from early November to mid-May, however, safe ice circulation is generally from mid-November to mid-April.

A forest road passes on the East side of Mouliers Lake.

== Geography ==
The hydrographic slopes near the Davoust River are:

- North side: Desorsons Lake, Rodayer Lake, Chaboullie Lake, Utamikaneu River;
- East side: Kapitastikweyack Creek, Pauschikushish River, Matawawaskweyau River;
- South side: Katutupisisikanuch Lake, Nottaway River;
- West side: Dusaux Lake, Nottaway River.

The Davoust River has its source at the mouth of Lake Mouliers (length: 2.9 kilometres (1.8 mi), wide: 2.4 kilometres (1.5 mi); Altitude: 244 metres (801 ft)).

From the mouth of Mouliers Lake, the Davoust River flows over 19.8 kilometres (12.3 mi) through the following segments:

- 6.9 kilometres (4.3 mi) northwesterly to a creek (coming from the North);
- 5.4 kilometres (3.4 mi) West to the East shore of Davoust Lake;
- 2.0 kilometres (1.2 mi) southwesterly crossing Davoust Lake (length: 2.4 kilometres (1.5 mi); altitude: 213 metres (699 ft), to its mouth;
- 5.5 kilometres (3.4 mi) west to mouth.

The mouth of the Davoust River is located at:

- 119.3 kilometres (74.1 mi) north-west of downtown Matagami;
- 96.4 kilometres (59.9 mi) Southeast of the confluence of the Nottaway River with Rupert Bay (connected to James Bay);
- 61.6 kilometres (38.3 mi) northwest of the mouth of Soscumica Lake;
- 83.3 kilometres (51.8 mi) east of the Ontario border.

== Toponymy ==
The toponym "Davoust River" was formalized on December 5, 1968, at the Commission de toponymie du Quebec.

== See also ==
- James Bay
- Rupert's Bay
- Nottaway River
- Eeyou Istchee Baie-James (municipality), a municipality
- James Bay
- Nunavik
- List of rivers of Quebec
