= Lepallier River =

Lepallier
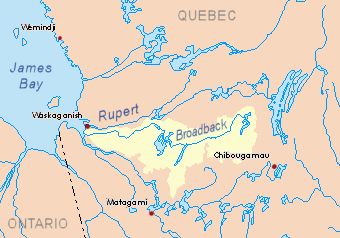
- Watershed of Broadback River

Location
- Country: Canada
- Province: Quebec
- Region: Nord-du-Québec

Physical characteristics
- Source: Lepallier Lake
  - location: Eeyou Istchee Baie-James (municipalité), Nord-du-Québec, Jamésie, Quebec
  - coordinates: 50°55′15″N 78°01′10″W
  - elevation: 190 m (620 ft)
- Mouth: Broadback River
  - location: Waskaganish (Cree village municipality), Nord-du-Québec, Jamésie, Quebec
  - coordinates: 51°18′55″N 78°44′09″W
  - elevation: 8.0 m (26.2 ft)
- Length: 39.3 km (24.4 mi)

Basin features
- Tributaries
  - left: Louvart River
  - right: (upstream); Kachiskayustikweyach creek; Kuat Kaakatech creek; Kapimichiskay creek.

The Lepallier River is a tributary of the south shore of the Broadback River flowing westward to Rupert Bay, located south of the James Bay. The Lepallier River flows in the municipalities of Eeyou Istchee Baie-James (municipality) and Waskaganish (Cree village municipality), in the administrative region of Nord-du-Québec, in Quebec, in Canada.

== Geography ==
The hydrographic slopes near the Lepallier River are:

- north side: Broadback River;
- east side: Machisipi River, Natouacamisie River;
- south side: Nottaway River;
- west side: Nottaway River, Rupert Bay.

The Lepallier River flows northwest between the Nottaway (located to the south) and the Broadback River (located to the north).

This hydrographic slope originates from Rodayer Lake (length: 67 kilometres (42 mi); altitude: 250 metres (820 ft)), located at 10.4 kilometres (6.5 mi) north of the Nottaway River, at 14 kilometres (8.7 mi) north of Desorsons Lake (elevation: 254 metres (833 ft)) and west of Utamikaneu Lake (surrounded by marsh, altitude: 261 metres (856 ft)).

From Lepallier Lake, the Lepallier River flows over 39.3 kilometres (24.4 mi), first to the northwest, then to the north, collecting the waters of the Louvart River (coming from the South-East) and crossing several marsh areas. Its mouth flows to the south bank of the Broadback River, southeast of the Cree village of Waskaganish (Cree village municipality), at 9.4 kilometres (5.8 mi) upstream of the mouth of the latter river, at 6.5 kilometres (4.0 mi) downstream of the mouth of the Machisipi River and at 11.3 kilometres (7.0 mi) downstream of the mouth of the Natouacamisie River.

The Lepallier River is accessible from the Rodayer Lake campground, near the "James Bay Road". The Lepallier River is accessible from the Rodayer Lake Campground, near the "James Bay Road".

== Toponymy ==
The old name of this watercourse was "Coussinet river".

The toponym "Lepallier River" was formalized on December 5, 1968, at the Commission de toponymie du Québec.

== See also ==
- Rupert Bay
- James Bay
- Broadback River
- Nottaway River
- Natouacamisie River
- Louvart River
- Waskaganish (Cree village municipality), a northern village in the Cree commconverty
- Eeyou Istchee James Bay (municipality)
- Jamésie
- List of rivers of Quebec
