= Deux Lacs River =

Deux Lacs
- Watershed of Nottaway River

Location
- Country: Canada
- Province: Quebec
- Region: Eeyou Istchee Baie-James (municipality)

Physical characteristics
- Source: Unidentified lake
  - location: Eeyou Istchee Baie-James (municipality), Nord-du-Québec, Quebec
  - coordinates: 49°56′55″N 77°46′41″W
  - elevation: 277 m (909 ft)
- Mouth: Nottaway River, Lac Soscumica
  - location: Eeyou Istchee Baie-James (municipality), Nord-du-Québec, Quebec
  - coordinates: 50°15′59″N 77°37′03″W
  - elevation: 243 m (797 ft)
- Length: 63.6 km (39.5 mi)

The Deux-Lacs River (French: "Rivière des Deux Lacs") is a tributary of the Nottaway River (via Soscumica Lake), in the administrative region of Nord-du-Québec, in the Canadian province of Quebec, in Canada. The course of the river flows in the cantons of Péruse, Paramé and Villieu.

Forestry is the main economic activity of the sector. Recreational tourism activities (especially hunting and fishing) come second, thanks to the navigable water of Lake Soscumica, including its tributaries.

The hydrographic slope of Lake Soscumica is accessible via the James Bay Highway (North-South direction) to 22.8 kilometres (14.2 mi) to the East. The west side of the lake is served by a winter road (North-South direction). The surface of the river is usually frozen from early November to mid-May, however, safe ice circulation is generally from mid-November to mid-April.

== Geography ==
The main neighboring hydrographic slopes are:

- North side: Soscumica Lake, Nottaway River;
- East side: Soscumica Lake, Nottaway River;
- South side: Matagami Lake, Allard River, Bell River;
- West side: Lake Montreau, Kitchigama River, Obamsca Lake.

From its source, the "Deux Lacs River" flows over 63.6 kilometres (39.5 mi), mostly in marsh areas, according to the following segments:

- 4.4 kilometres (2.7 mi) to the northwest in the township of Perugia, to a creek (coming from the North);
- 7.2 kilometres (4.5 mi) northwesterly to a stream (from the south);
- 7.4 kilometres (4.6 mi) to the northeast, to the limit of the township of Paramé;
- 16.4 kilometres (10.2 mi) northeasterly in the township of Paramé, to the mouth of Lac Bouchier (length: 11.1 kilometres (6.9 mi); altitude: 240 metres (790 ft)) that the current crosses towards the Northeast on its full length;
- 15.6 kilometres (9.7 mi) northeasterly to the mouth of Lake Montreuil (length: 6.6 kilometres (4.1 mi); altitude: 243 metres (797 ft)) that the current flows through its full length;
- 6.0 kilometres (3.7 mi) northeasterly to mouth.

The "Deux Lacs River" flows on the southern shore of the northern part of Soscumica Lake. This confluence is located at:

- 8.6 kilometres (5.3 mi) Southeast of the mouth of Soscumica Lake;
- 133.5 kilometres (83.0 mi) Southeast of the mouth of the Nottaway River (confluence with Rupert Bay);
- 56.4 kilometres (35.0 mi) North of downtown Matagami, Quebec;
- 26.4 kilometres (16.4 mi) North of the mouth of the Matagami Lake.

== Toponymy ==
This river name refers to two lakes: Lake Bouchier and Lake Montreuil.

The toponym "Deux Lacs River" was officialized on December 5, 1968, at the Commission de toponymie du Québec, at the creation of this commission

== See also ==
- James Bay
- Rupert Bay
- Nottaway River
- Lake Soscumica
- List of rivers of Quebec
