= Pauschikushish Ewiwach River =

Pauschikushish Ewiwach
- Watershed of Nottaway River

Location
- Country: Canada
- Province: Quebec
- Region: Eeyou Istchee Baie-James (municipality)

Physical characteristics
- Source: Creek of marsh
  - location: Eeyou Istchee Baie-James (municipality), Nord-du-Québec, Quebec
  - coordinates: 50°35′16″N 77°20′45″W
  - elevation: 289 m (948 ft)
- Mouth: Dana Lake (Eeyou Istchee Baie-James)
  - location: Eeyou Istchee Baie-James (municipality), Nord-du-Québec, Quebec
  - coordinates: 50°44′10″N 77°22′14″W
  - elevation: 241 m (791 ft)
- Length: 74.8 km (46.5 mi)

Basin features
- Tributaries
  - left: (from the mouth) Matawawskweyasi creek, Matawawaskweyau River, Kakaskutatakuch creek, Iskaskunikaw River.
  - right: (from the mouth) Mitapeschiskau creek, Kapisaukanew creek.

The Pauschikushish River Ewiwach is a tributary of Dana Lake (Eeyou Istchee Baie-James) in Regional County Municipality (RCM) of Eeyou Istchee Baie-James (municipality), in the administrative region of Nord-du-Québec, in the Canadian province of Quebec, in Canada.

The hydrographic slope of the “Pauschikushish Ewiwach River” does not have a nearby access road; however, the northern route from Matagami passes 3.1 kilometres (1.9 mi) west of a curve of the “Pauschikushish Ewiwach River”. The surface of the river is usually frozen from early November to mid-May, however, safe ice circulation is generally from mid-November to mid-April.

== Geography ==
The main hydrographic slopes near the “Pauschikushish Ewiwach River” are:

- North side: Dana Lake (Eeyou Istchee Baie-James), Du Tast Lake;
- East side: Enistustikweyach River, Evans Lake, Broadback River;
- South side: Muskiki River, Nottaway River, Soscumica Lake;
- West side: Dusaux Lake, Nottaway River, Davoust River.

The “Pauschikushish Ewiwach River” has its source of a stream (elevation: 289 metres (948 ft)) surrounded by marsh and located at:

- 3.1 kilometres (1.9 mi) south-west of Lake Ouagama;
- 10.7 kilometres (6.6 mi) south of Evans Lake;
- 20.0 kilometres (12.4 mi) south-east of the mouth of the “Pauschikushish Ewiwach River”;
- 34.2 kilometres (21.3 mi) southeast of the mouth of Dana Lake (Eeyou Istchee Baie-James);
- 99 kilometres (62 mi) north of downtown Matagami.

From its source, the "Pauschikushish Ewiwach River" flows over 74.8 kilometres (46.5 mi) according to the following segments:

Upper course of the' Pauschikushish Ewiwach River (segment of 57.4 kilometres (35.7 mi))

- 13.7 kilometres (8.5 mi) easterly to a creek (coming from the northeast);
- 21.0 kilometres (13.0 mi) westerly passing the north side of a mountain whose summit reaches 322 metres (1,056 ft), to the Iskaskunikaw River (coming from the South);
- 12.3 kilometres (7.6 mi) northwesterly to the northeast of Kakusikuch Hill (elevation: 256 metres (840 ft)) to Kakuskwapiminakuch Creek (coming from the south);
- 10.4 kilometres (6.5 mi) north across the Amikanan Rapids, then forming a hook to the east, to the confluence of the Matawawaskweyau River (coming from the west);

Lower section of the' Pauschikushish Ewiwach River (segment of 17.4 kilometres (10.8 mi))

- 4.7 kilometres (2.9 mi) northeasterly in a marsh zone to Kapisaukanwe Creek (from the southeast);
- 3.1 kilometres (1.9 mi) northeasterly in a marsh zone to Matawawskweyasi Creek (from the northwest);
- 6.1 kilometres (3.8 mi) easterly forming a hook to the south to Mitapeschiskau Creek (coming from the northeast);
- 0.8 kilometres (0.50 mi) north to the mouth of the river.

The "Pauschikushish Ewiwach River" flows into a bay on the south shore of [Dana Lake (Eeyou Istchee Baie-James)] where the current flows north and east, where it flows into a bay west of Evans Lake.

The mouth of the "Pauschikushish Ewiwach River" is located at:

- 25.1 kilometres (15.6 mi) south-west of the mouth of Dana Lake (Eeyou Istchee Baie-James);
- 48.9 kilometres (30.4 mi) Southwest of the mouth of Evans Lake
- 45.2 kilometres (28.1 mi) north of Lake Soscumica;
- 125.2 kilometres (77.8 mi) south-east of the mouth of the Broadback River;

North of downtown Matagami.

== Toponymy ==
Of Cree origin, the toponym "Pauschikushish Ewiwach River" means: "the river flowing from the small rapids".

The toponym "Pauschikushish Ewiwach River" was formalized on December 5, 1968, at the Commission de toponymie du Québec

== See also ==
- James Bay
- Rupert Bay
- Broadback River, a watercourse
- Evans Lake, a body of water
- Dana Lake (Eeyou Istchee Baie-James), a body of water
- Matawawaskweyau River, a watercourse
- Kakaskutatakuch River, a watercourse
- Iskaskunikaw River, a watercourse
- List of rivers of Quebec
