= Du Tast Lake =

Lake in Nord-du-Québec, Quebec, Canada

Tast Lake
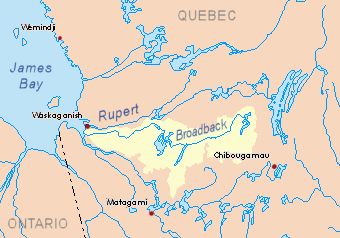
- Broadback River basin in yellow

- Location within Quebec
- Location: Eeyou Istchee James Bay
- Coordinates: 50°59′19″N 77°23′21″W
- Type: Natural
- Primary inflows: Kauskatitineu River
- Basin countries: Canada
- Max. length: 12.2 kilometres (7.6 mi)
- Max. width: 7.4 kilometres (4.6 mi)
- Surface elevation: 241 metres (791 ft)

The Du Tast Lake is a freshwater body of the municipality of Eeyou Istchee James Bay, in the administrative region of Nord-du-Québec, in the province of Quebec, at Canada.

The hydrographic slope of Lake Du Tast is accessible through the forest road to the North from Matagami and passing 12.7 kilometres (7.9 mi) west of the lake. The surface of the lake is usually frozen from early November to mid-May, however, safe ice circulation is generally from mid-November to mid-April.

== Geography ==
This lake has a length of 12.1 kilometres (7.5 mi), a maximum width of 7.4 kilometres (4.6 mi) and an altitude of 242 metres (794 ft). A peninsula connected to the East bank moves westward on 4.1 kilometres (2.5 mi), giving the lake the shape of a half doughnut open to the East. The lake has 13 small islands, the main one being Kauskwepikach Island. A strip of land of 2.8 kilometres (1.7 mi) wide separates the "Lake Du Tast" and the Dana Lake (Eeyou Istchee Baie-James).

The "Lake Du Tast" receives on the Southwest side the waters of the Kauskatitineu River and some streams coming from the North-West. The Atikuschekw Marsh is located on the northwestern side of the northern part of "Lake Du Tast". Several marsh areas are located all around the lake.

The mouth of "Lake Du Tast" is located at the bottom of a bay on the eastern shore of the northern part of the lake. This mouth is located at:

- 18.2 kilometres (11.3 mi) west of the mouth of Dana Lake (Eeyou Istchee Baie-James);
- 44.5 kilometres (27.7 mi) south-west of the mouth of Evans Lake;
- 108.2 kilometres (67.2 mi) east of the mouth of the Broadback River (confluence with James Bay);
- 136.7 kilometres (84.9 mi) north of downtown Matagami.

The "Du Tast Lake" discharge flows on 17.0 kilometres (10.6 mi) winding eastwards into marsh areas to the north shore of Dana Lake (Eeyou Istchee Baie-James). This confluence with this latter lake is located at 2.5 kilometres (1.6 mi) west of the mouth of Kaitupscheyau Creek.

The main hydrographic slopes near Lake Du Tast are:

- North side: Broadback River, Rupert River;
- East side: Dana Lake (Eeyou Istchee Baie-James), Evans Lake, Broadback River;
- South side: Muskiki River, Chabinoche River, Enistustikweyach River;
- West side: Colomb Lake, Nottaway River.

== Toponymy ==
The toponym "lac du Tast" (French name) was formalized on December 5, 1968, by the Commission de toponymie du Québec when it was created.

== See also ==
- Broadback River, a watercourse
- Evans Lake, a body of water
- Dana Lake (Eeyou Istchee Baie-James), a body of water
- Eeyou Istchee Baie-James (municipality), a municipality
- List of lakes in Canada
