= Salamandre River =

Salamandre
- Watershed of Nottaway River

Location
- Country: Canada
- Province: Quebec
- Region: Eeyou Istchee Baie-James (municipality)

Physical characteristics
- Source: Confluence of two forested creeks
  - location: Eeyou Istchee Baie-James (municipality), Nord-du-Québec, Quebec
  - coordinates: 50°33′10″N 76°50′39″W
  - elevation: 290 m (950 ft)
- Mouth
  - location: Eeyou Istchee Baie-James (municipality), Nord-du-Québec, Quebec
  - coordinates: 50°47′07″N 76°34′21″W
  - elevation: 241 m (791 ft)
- Length: 47.3 km (29.4 mi)

The Salamandre River is a tributary of the south shore of the Broadback River which flows west to the Rupert Bay, located south of the James Bay. The Salamandre River flows in the municipality of Eeyou Istchee Baie-James (municipality), in the administrative region of Nord-du-Québec, in Quebec, in Canada.

The watershed area of the Salamandre River has few vehicular forest roads; however, the northern route from Matagami passes 38.8 kilometres (24.1 mi) south-west of Salamandre Lake (Broadback River). The surface of the river is usually frozen from early November to mid-May, however, safe ice circulation is generally from mid-November to mid-April.

== Geography ==
The surrounding hydrographic slopes of the Salamandre River are:

- North side: Broadback River;
- East side: Broadback River, Quénonisca Lake, Rocher Lake, Nipukatasi River;
- South side: Salamandre Lake, Quénonisca Lake, Opataouaga Lake;
- West side: Lake Ouagama, Evans Lake.

The Salamandre River originates at the confluence of two forest streams at an altitude of 290 metres (950 ft). This source is located at:

- 35.9 kilometres (22.3 mi) Southwest of the mouth of the Salamandre River (confluence with the Broadback River;
- 23.1 kilometres (14.4 mi) Southeast of Evans Lake;
- 122.5 kilometres (76.1 mi) Northeast of downtown Matagami.

From its source, the Salamandre River flows over 47.3 kilometres (29.4 mi) according to the following segments:

- 14.9 kilometres (9.3 mi) easterly to the west shore of Salamandre Lake;
- 14.0 kilometres (8.7 mi) north-east across Salamandre Lake (length: 14.4 kilometres (8.9 mi); altitude: 265 metres (869 ft)). Note: Salamandre Lake is the main body of water supplying the Salamandre River;
- 8.4 kilometres (5.2 mi) to the North, forming a curve to the Northeast, to the confluence of a river (coming from the south-west);
- 10.0 kilometres (6.2 mi) north to mouth.

The mouth of the Salamandre River empties onto the south shore of the Broadback River at 16.1 kilometres (10.0 mi) upstream of Evans Lake. This confluence is located at 9.3 kilometres (5.8 mi) west of the summit of Mount Rabbit (elevation: 390 kilometres (240 mi)).

== Toponymy ==
Formerly, the Salamandre River was designated "Whitefish River" and "White Fish River".

The toponym “rivière Salamandre” was made official on December 5, 1968, at the Commission de toponymie du Québec, i.e. at the creation of this commission.

== See also ==
- Rupert Bay
- James Bay
- Broadback River
- Evans Lake
- Eeyou Istchee James Bay (municipality)
- Jamésie
- List of rivers of Quebec
