= Lac Doré Vanadium Deposit =

The Lac Doré Vanadium Deposit is a vanadium deposit first discovered by the Government of Quebec at Dorés Lake. The closest mining town to the site is Matagami. In 1998, its control was transferred to the Société générale de financement du Québec, and its wholly owned subsidiary SOQUEM

In 2002, McKenzie Bay International announced it had taken the first step towards development of the deposit since the completion of a feasibility study by SNC Lavalin (PR 16 April 2002). Entraco, a Montreal based environmental consulting firm, was contacted to help out with the environmental impact study and secure necessary permits to construct a mine, refinery and product manufacturing facilities at Lac Doré. Entraco was instructed to apply the same high environmental standards established in previous cases, to minimize environmental issues later on.

No action was taken until 21 August 2007 when claims covering the renowned deposit expired. Apella Resources and SOQUEM both staked their claims that day. In 2009 Apella Resources received the rights to the stake in a preliminary ruling. In December 2009 assaying found the ore to have from 0.46% to 0.64% of V_{2}O_{5}.

The Lac Dore Vanadium Deposit is one of 18 claims that Apella has in the area. Combined their area is 300 hectares.
