= Lake Naococane =

Lake in Quebec, Canada

- Location within Quebec
- Location: Baie-James, Quebec
- Coordinates: 52°51′47″N 70°38′15″W
- Basin countries: Canada

Lake Naococane (Lac Naococane) is a lake in northern Quebec, Canada. It is located in the eastern part of the municipality of Baie-James.
