= Sphinx Resources =

Sphinx Resources Ltd.
- Formerly: Donner Metals Ltd.
- Type: Public
- Traded as: TSX-V: SFX
- Industry: Mining
- Founded: June 28, 2005
- Headquarters: Montreal, Quebec, Canada
- Key people: David Patterson -Chairman; Normand Champigney-President; Harvey Keats-CEO
- Products: Zinc, Copper, Gold, Silver
- Website: https://sphinxresources.ca/en/

Sphinx Resources Ltd. (formerly Donner Metals Ltd.) is a Canadian company focused on exploration of precious and base metals within mining rights in Quebec. It is listed on the TSX Venture Exchange. The company was formerly named Donner Metals Ltd., headquarters are in Vancouver, and active in other provinces, but changed names in 2014 and moved its headquarters to Montreal, Quebec. As Donner, its principal project was a 35-65 joint venture with Glencore Xstrata (the operator and 65% interest holder) in Matagami, Quebec.

== History ==
The company was founded in 1996 as a mining exploration company prospecting in South Voisey's Bay, Newfoundland and Labrador. While this project eventually stalled, along the way a relationship with Falconbridge was developed.

In 2006, Donner signed a deal with Falconbridge, wherein Donner was required to spend $20 million by May 31, 2011, plus an additional $5 million if a brand new discovery was made. The deal effectively makes Donner "the funding vehicle for exploration within the Matagami base metal camp". Glencore Xstrata can earn back a 15% interest on each of the 6 JV areas. Glencore Xstrata has earned the additional 15% in the Bracemac-McLeod and South Flank JVs.

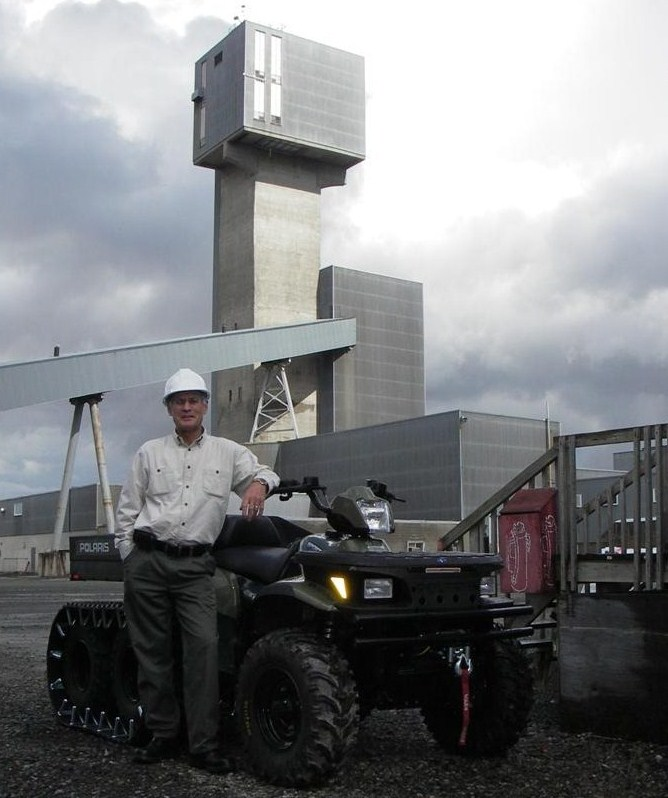
Donner Metals Ltd.'s CEO Harvey Keats in front of Xstrata Zinc's Matagami Mill

== Matagami Project ==
Since signing the deal, the joint-venture partners have focused their efforts on the South Flank and Bracemac-McLeod properties. The property is located 6 km southeast of Xstrata's Matagami Mill. On January 19, 2007, Donner announced the discovery of a zinc-copper massive sulphide deposit averaging 9.12% zinc and 1.21% copper over 16 metres, and 13.98% zinc and 3.69% copper over 8.8 metres. In February 2009, Genivar Engineering was contracted to compile and release a National Instrument 43-101 compliant resource estimate of 3,623,000 tonnes at 11.52% zinc, 1.60% copper, 31.55 g/t silver and 0.49 g/t gold. Since completing a scoping study Xstrata has completed drilling on an accelerated feasibility study on the Bracemac-McLeod area Xstrata began construction in July 2010, with full production scheduled for May 2013. Production began on May 15, 2013, at 3,000 tonnes per day, the mill capacity Xstrata is the operator of the project.

== Bracemac-McLeod Mine ==
On July 9, 2010, Xstrata Zinc announced they will immediately begin development of the Bracemac-McLeod deposit. In an official public statement Xstrata News Room July 9, 2010 made at 11:30am (EST) in Matagami, Xstrata Zinc announced this next step for the Matagami Mining Camp and credited the success of the combined Xstrata-Donner exploration team that made the discovery of this deposit. Xstrata Zinc's expedient decision to develop Bracemac-McLeod was made in order to meet a timeline that is expected to enable production from Bracemac-McLeod to replace production from Xstrata's wholly owned Perseverance mine without a gap in feed to the Matagami mill.

CTV News reported that Xstrata Zinc Canada is going ahead with a new base metals mine in northwestern Quebec that will create about 250 jobs. The combined Xstrata-Donner exploration team discovered the ore deposit and the two companies will spend $158-million to develop the project. Jean Desrosiers, vice-president of mining operations for Xstrata Zinc Canada, said he is "delighted" with development of the Bracemac-McLeod mine, which will produce 80,000 tonnes of zinc and 10,000 tonnes of copper annually when it opens in 2013. "The project is a low capital cost, high return project that will provide a continued feed of ore to Xstrata's Matagami concentrator once the Perseverance Mine comes to the end of its life," he said in a release. "The new mine will use existing processing infrastructure and will provide ongoing employment opportunities for the existing work force at Perseverance. The new mine will also minimize its environmental footprint by using the closed Bell-Allard South mine pit to dig the new ramp."

== Awards ==
In November 2007, Donner was presented the Prospector of the Year Award by the Quebec Mineral Exploration Association.

In December 2008, Donner won The Mining Journal (trade magazine)'s Outstanding Exploration Achievement Award.

In November 2010, Donner and Xstrata accepted the Development of the Year award from the Quebec Mineral Exploration Association.
