= Dana Lake =

Lake in Eeyou Istchee Baie-James, Quebec, Canada

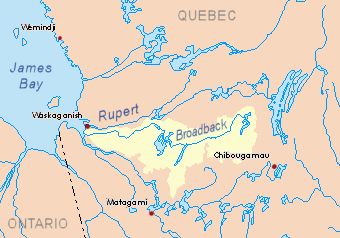
- Broadback River basin in yellow

- Location within Quebec
- Location: Baie-James
- Coordinates: 50°53′03″N 77°20′15″W
- Type: Natural
- Primary inflows: Discharge of Du Tast Lake, Utamikaneu River, Kapisaukanew creek, Pauschikushish Ewiwach River, Enistustikweyach River, Upaunan River.
- Primary outflows: Evans Lake, Broadback River
- Basin countries: Canada
- Max. length: 37.5 kilometres (23.3 mi)
- Max. width: 7.5 kilometres (4.7 mi)
- Surface elevation: 241 metres (791 ft)

The Lake Dana is a freshwater body of the territory of Eeyou Istchee Baie-James (municipality), in the administrative region of Nord-du-Québec, in the province of Quebec, at Canada.

The Dana Lake Hydrographic watershed is accessible via the forest road to the north from Matagami passing at 13.4 kilometres (8.3 mi) to the West of the lake. The surface of the lake is usually frozen from early November to mid-May, however, safe ice circulation is generally from mid-November to mid-April.

== Geography ==
This lake has a length of 37.5 kilometres (23.3 mi) with two parts, a maximum width of 7.5 kilometres (4.7 mi) in the southern part and an altitude of 241 metres (791 ft). Kapunamisi Point advances Northeast on 6.4 kilometres (4.0 mi), separating the lake into two parts.

The northern part is crescent-shaped and has a navigable length of 60 kilometres (37 mi) including the bay of the Utamikaneu River. It receives on the West side the waters of the Utamikaneu River and on the North side the discharge of Du Tast Lake. The northern part of the lake includes Wapushunikw Peninsula, Kaupakameyach Point and Chipikamikw Point.

The southern part (length: 12.7 kilometres (7.9 mi)) of the lake receives the waters of the [Pauschikushish Ewiwach River], the Enistustikweyach River and the Upaunan River. These last two rivers flow into Kapichiwashahach Bay. The Mitapeschikaw hill is located west of the southern part of the lake and the Epaschipich hill to the East.

Lake Dana has many bays and peninsulas. The two parts of the lake are interconnected by a strait with a length of 3.8 kilometres (2.4 mi) and whose width varies between 0.3 kilometres (0.19 mi) and 0.5 kilometres (0.31 mi). The area around Lake Dana has many marshes.

The mouth of Dana Lake is directly connected by a short strait to Evans Lake, designated Pastukamau Pass, which connects it to the West Bay of Evans Lake. This mouth is located at the bottom of a bay in the Northwest to:

- 26.0 kilometres (16.2 mi) Southwest of the mouth of Evans Lake;
- 9.7 kilometres (6.0 mi) Southwest of Kirk Island, located on Evans Lake;
- 126.5 kilometres (78.6 mi) East of the mouth of the Broadback River (confluence with James Bay);
- 133.6 kilometres (83.0 mi) North of downtown Matagami

The main hydrographic slopes near Lake Dana are:

- North side: Broadback River, Rupert River;
- East side: Evans Lake, Broadback River;
- South side: Muskiki River, Chabinoche river, Enistustikweyach river;
- West side: Rodayer Lake, Desorsons Lake, Nottaway River.

== Toponymy ==
The toponym "Lac Dana" was formalized on December 5, 1968, by the Commission de toponymie du Québec when it was created.

== See also ==
- Broadback River, a watercourse
- Evans Lake, a body of water
- Du Tast Lake, a body of water
- Etamikaneu River, a watercourse
- Utamikaneu River, a watercourse
- Pauschikushish Ewiwach River, a watercourse
- Enistustikweyach River, a watercourse
- Upaunan River, a watercourse
- Eeyou Istchee Baie-James (municipality), a municipality
- List of lakes in Canada
