= Muskiki River =

Muskiki

Location
- Country: Canada
- Province: Quebec
- Region: Eeyou Istchee Baie-James (municipality)

Physical characteristics
- Source: Forested creek
  - location: Eeyou Istchee Baie-James (municipality), Nord-du-Québec, Quebec
  - coordinates: 50°013′45″N 77°08′49″W
  - elevation: 277 m (909 ft)
- Mouth: Nottaway River, Lac Soscumica
  - location: Eeyou Istchee Baie-James (municipality), Nord-du-Québec, Quebec
  - coordinates: 50°18′48″N 77°23′00″W
  - elevation: 243 m (797 ft)
- Length: 60.4 km (37.5 mi)

The Muskiki River is a tributary of the Nottaway River (via Lake Soscumica, in the administrative region of Nord-du-Québec, in the Canadian province of Quebec, at Canada.

Forestry is the main economic activity of the sector. Recreational tourism (especially hunting and fishing) comes second, thanks to the navigable water of Lake Soscumica, including the tributaries.

The hydrographic slope of Soscumica Lake can be reached via the James Bay Highway (North-South direction), passing eastward to 22.8 kilometres (14.2 mi). The west side of the lake is served by a winter road (North-South direction). The surface of the river is usually frozen from early November to mid-May, however, safe ice circulation is generally from mid-November to mid-April.

== Geography ==
The main neighboring hydrographic slopes are:

- North side: Soscumica Lake, Nottaway River;
- East side: Lake Ouescapis, Poncheville River, Lake Chensagi;
- South side: Matagami Lake, Nottaway River, Waswanipi River;
- West side: Soscumica Lake, Nottaway River.

The source of the Muskiki River is located at 3.4 kilometres (2.1 mi) west of the James Bay Highway (North-South direction).

From its source, the Muskiki River flows on 60.4 kilometres (37.5 mi) according to the following segments:

- 5.6 kilometres (3.5 mi) northeasterly to the James Bay Highway (north-south direction);
- 11.4 kilometres (7.1 mi) north along the James Bay road on the east side to the bridge where it cuts the road again;
- 24.3 kilometres (15.1 mi) southwesterly, north, then west, to a stream (from the north);
- 14.9 kilometres (9.3 mi) southwesterly to a creek (coming from the North);
- 4.2 kilometres (2.6 mi) southwesterly to mouth.

The Muskiki River flows into a large bay on the Northeastern shore of Soscumica Lake. This confluence is located at:

- 20.7 kilometres (12.9 mi) south-east of the mouth of Lake Soscumica;
- 145.9 kilometres (90.7 mi) south-east of the mouth of the Nottaway River (confluence with Rupert Bay);
- 64.0 kilometres (39.8 mi) North of downtown Matagami, Quebec;
- 32.1 kilometres (19.9 mi) North of the mouth of the Matagami Lake.

== Toponymy ==
The toponym "Muskiki" was officialized on December 5, 1968, at the Commission de toponymie du Québec, i.e. at the creation of this commission

== See also ==
- James Bay
- Rupert Bay
- Nottaway River
- List of rivers of Quebec
