= Lake Evans (Quebec) =

Lake in Nord-du-Québec, Quebec, Canada

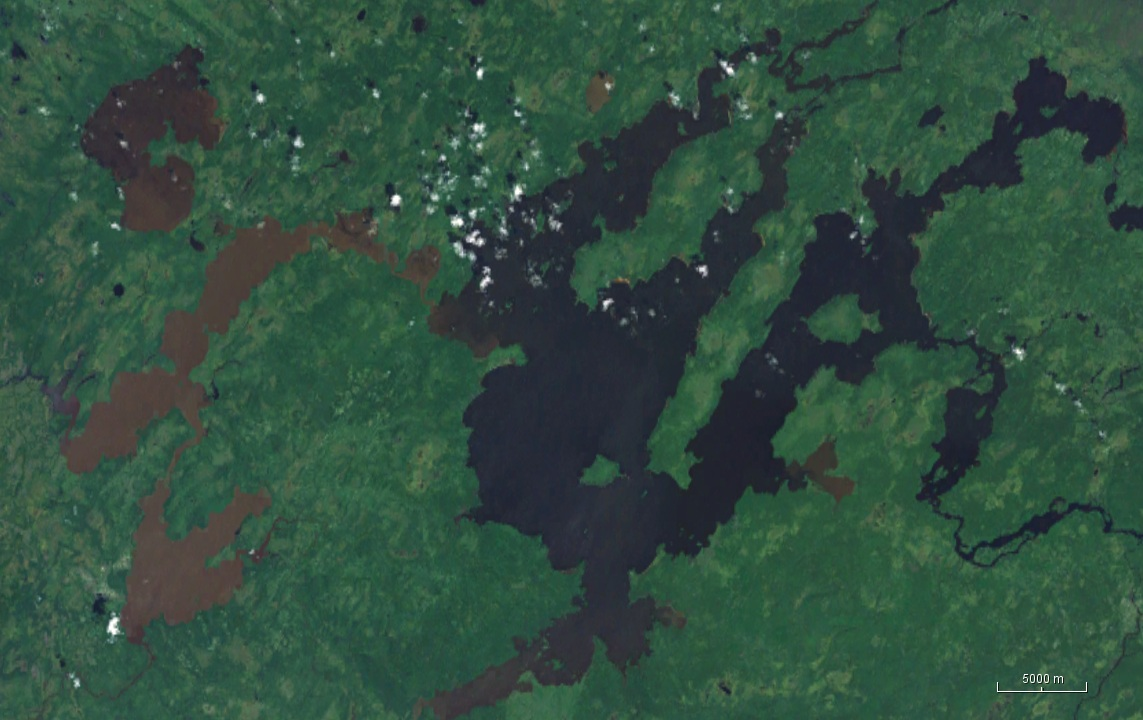

- Location within Quebec
- Location: Baie-James, Quebec, Canada
- Coordinates: 50°54′13″N 76°57′53″W
- Type: natural
- Primary inflows: Chabinoche River, Enistustikweyach River (through Dana Lake), Pauschikushish Ewiwach River (through Dana Lake), Kauskatitineu River (through Du Tast Lake and Dana Lake)
- Primary outflows: Broadback River
- Catchment area: Broadback River
- Basin countries: Quebec, Canada
- Max. length: 56.1 km (34.9 mi)
- Max. width: 25.6 km (15.9 mi)
- Surface area: 479 km^{2} (185 sq mi)
- Max. depth: 26 m (85 ft)
- Surface elevation: 234 km (145 mi)

Lake Evans (French: Lac Evans) is a freshwater lake in the municipality of Eeyou Istchee James Bay, in the administrative region of Nord-du-Québec, in western Quebec, Canada. This lake is on the Broadback River.

== Geography ==
Surrounded by a generally flat lands including marshes, Lake Evans is located 130 kilometres (81 mi) south-east of James Bay. This lake has an area of 479 km^{2} (185 sq mi). It receives the waters of the "Lake Le Gardeur" (adjacent to the east side) through the Théodat River and Lake Dana (west side neighbor) through Pastukamau pass. Lake Evans is the largest lake on the Broadback River.

Lake Evans has deep bays that give it an irregular contour. Areas surrounding the lake have a generally flat topography, with several marshes, except for the area south of the lake where culminate the Reid and Middleton Mountains.

For canoeists, the lake is renowned for the difficult portage over Longue Pointe peninsula.

== Toponymy ==
Evans Lake, receiving this name around 1910, was named in honour of Sir John Evans (1823-1908), archaeologist, geologist and paper manufacturer, an influential member of several learned societies. Evans held the positions of Treasurer of the "Royal Society" from 1878 to 1898, President of the "Numismatic Society" from 1872 to 1908, and president of the "Society of Antiquaries" London in 1885. Evans also is the author in numismatic field of books now considered classics, and in the tools and weapons of prehistoric populations of Britain.

Prior to the formalization as "Lac Evans" on December 5, 1968, by the Commission de toponymie du Québec, this lake was known as Big Lake, Long Lake, or Turgeon Lake.

== History ==
In 1817, John Pitt Greely was sent by the Hudson's Bay Company (HBC) to set up a new fur trade post on Lake Waswanipi in order to compete with the North West Company. But since the rivers going to Lake Waswanipi were frozen early, he was forced to stay at Evans Lake (called Big Lake at the time) where he established Big Lake House. Greely, along with his wife and two of his men, Hendric Swainson and Simon Corston, starved to death there in 1818. The following year, a post was established at Lake Waswanipi by the HBC and Big Lake House was abandoned by 1821.

The lake was explored and described by geologist Robert Bell and O'Sullivan Surveyor in 1900 and 1901.

== See also ==
- Rupert Bay
- List of lakes of Canada
