= Soscumica Lake =

Lake in south-western Quebec, Canada

- Watershed of Nattaway River

- Location within Quebec
- Location: Baie-James, Quebec
- Coordinates: 50°16′21″N 77°27′33″W
- Type: Natural
- Primary inflows: Muskiki River, Nottaway River, Deux Lacs River.
- Max. length: 39.9 kilometres (24.8 mi)
- Max. width: 8.8 kilometres (5.5 mi)
- Surface area: 66.97 square kilometres (25.86 sq mi)

Soscumica Lake is a lake of the southern portion of Eeyou Istchee James Bay (municipality), in the administrative region of Nord-du-Québec, in the province of in south-western Quebec, Canada. The southern part of Lake Soscumica extends into Millet Township.

Forestry is the main economic activity of the sector. Recreational tourism (especially hunting and fishing) comes second, thanks to the navigable body of water, including the tributaries.

The hydrographic slope of Lake Soscumica is accessible via the James Bay Highway (North-South direction) to 22.8 kilometres (14.2 mi) to the East. The west side of the lake is served by a winter road (North-South direction). The surface of the lake is usually frozen from early November to mid-May, however, safe ice circulation is generally from mid-November to mid-April.

== Geography ==
With a length of 39.9 kilometres (24.8 mi), Soscumica Lake is shaped like a large V open to the Southwest. The northern part (East-West direction) has an arm length of 20 kilometres (12 mi); the arm of the north-south axis measures 23 kilometres (14 mi). The width of this body of water generally varies from 1 to 5 kilometres (3.1 mi), except the bay at the mouth of the Muskiki River which extends to 8.8 kilometres (5.5 mi). Lake Soscumica has many islands, peninsulas and bays.

This lake is crossed by the Nottaway River which drains the Lake Matagami (located in the South). The confluence of the Nottaway River with Soscumica Lake is located at 44.4 kilometres (27.6 mi) North of downtown Matagami, Quebec. Lake Soscumica is located at 19 kilometres (12 mi) South of Kauskwepatinach Hill with a peak of 322 metres (1,056 ft).

The main hydrographic slopes near Soscumica Lake are:

- North side: Muskiki River, Iskaskunikaw River, Pauschikushish Ewiwach River;
- East side: Waswanipi River, Ouescapis Lake, Poncheville Lake, Chensagi River, Maicasagi River;
- South side: Nottaway River, Matagami Lake;
- West side: Nottaway River, Deux Lacs River, Montreuil Lake, Kitchigama River.

The mouth of this lake Soscumica is located at:

- 123.8 kilometres (76.9 mi) southeasterly of the mouth of the Nottaway River (confluence with Rupert Bay);
- 65 kilometres (40 mi) north of downtown Matagami;
- 130.8 kilometres (81.3 mi) east of the Quebec - Ontario border;
- 36 kilometres (22 mi) northwest of the mouth of Matagami Lake.

== Toponymy ==
Geologist Robert Bell, exploring the Nottaway River in 1895-1896, translates Soscumica by slippery shores. This name could come from the term "soos'koskumikaw", "soo'skwaw", slippery and oskumikaw, soil, ground.

The name "Lac Soscumica" was officialized on December 5, 1968 by the Commission de toponymie du Québec when it was created.

== See also ==
- James Bay
- Rupert Bay
- Nottaway River, a watercourse
- Deux Lacs River, a watercourse
- Muskiki River, a watercourse
- James Bay
- Eeyou Istchee Baie-James (municipality), a municipality
- List of lakes in Canada
