= Nottaway River =

Nottaway
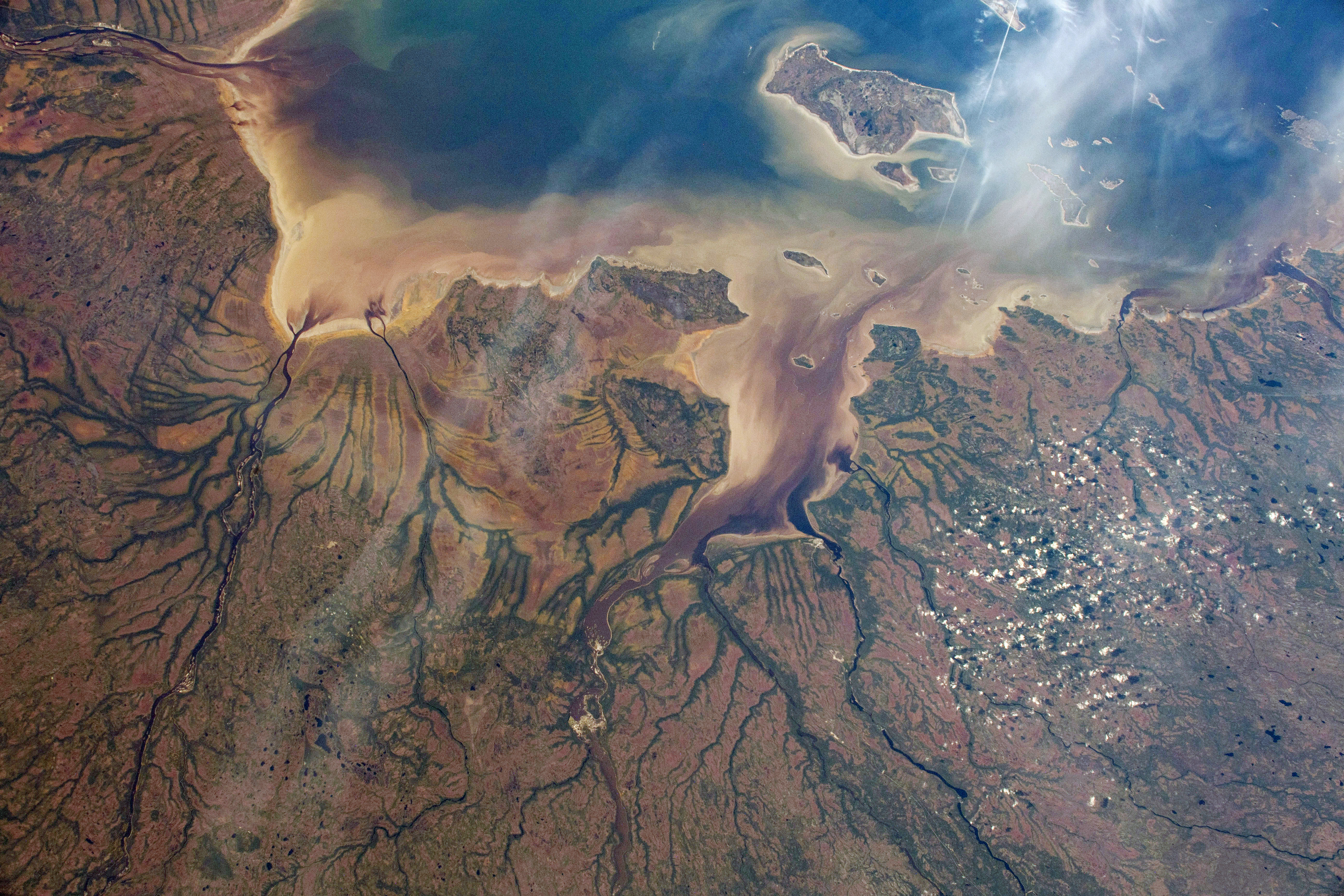

- Nottaway River basin in yellow

Location
- Country: Canada
- Province: Quebec
- Region: Jamésie

Physical characteristics
- Source: Lake Matagami
  - location: Matagami
  - coordinates: 50°03′00″N 77°28′10″W
- Mouth: Rupert Bay off James Bay
  - location: About 17 km SW of Waskaganish
  - coordinates: 51°23′30″N 78°48′00″W
  - elevation: 0 m (0 ft)
- Length: 200.2 km (124.4 mi)
- Basin size: 65,800 km^{2} (25,400 sq mi)
- Discharge
  - average: 1,190 m^{3}/s (42,000 cu ft/s)

Basin features
- Tributaries
  - left: (upstream from the mouth): Kitchigama River; Iroquois River (rivière des Iroquois); Richerville River; Kawayuyamiskupau Creek; Matawayuapiskau Creek; discharge of lakes Mistatikamekw; and Kapapakwasu: Deux Lacs River; Natchiowatchouan River
  - right: (upstream from the mouth): Davoust River; Nestipuku Creek; Kouskatistin Creek; discharge of lake Dusaux; Muskiki River

The Nottaway River is a river in Quebec, Canada. The river drains Lake Matagami and travels 225 kilometres (140 mi) north-west before emptying into Rupert Bay at the south end of James Bay. Its drainage basin is 65,800 square kilometres (25,400 sq mi) and has a mean discharge of 1190 m^{3}/s (1556 yd^{3}/s). Its source is the head of the Mégiscane River, which is 776 kilometres (482 mi) from the mouth.

Significant lakes along its course are Soscumica Lake (50°15′N 77°27′W) and Dusaux Lake (50°45′00″N 77°53′30″W).

The Nottaway, together with the Broadback and Rupert Rivers, was initially considered to be dammed and developed as part of the James Bay Project. But in 1972 hydro-electric development began on the more northerly La Grande and Eastmain Rivers, and the NBR Project was shelved. With the decision to divert the Rupert River to the La Grande, it is not likely that the Nottaway will be developed in the foreseeable future.

== Geography ==
Nottaway means the lower course of Lake Matagami and a length of 200.2 kilometres (124.4 mi), of a watercourse which originates in the Mégiscane Lake. The whole is a long river of 776 kilometres (482 mi) units flowing through many lakes. On the way to the northwest, the Nottaway, from Lake Matagami, creates the lakes of Soscumica and Dusaux, collects the waters of several rivers - notably the Kitchigama River and ends its race in Rupert Bay at the southern end of James Bay, at the western area of the Broadback River and Rupert River.

Its drainage basin is 65,800 square kilometres (25,400 sq mi) and has an average discharge of 1,190 cubic metres per second (42,000 cu ft/s). The course of the river crosses many marsh areas, especially in its lower part.

The mouth of Matagami Lake is located:

- 32.2 kilometres (20.0 mi) North of downtown Matagami;
- 159.5 kilometres (99.1 mi) South of the confluence of the Nottaway River and Rupert Bay;
- 114.7 kilometres (71.3 mi) Northwest of the center of the village of Lebel-sur-Quévillon, Quebec.

From the mouth of Matagami Lake, the Nottaway River flows on 200.2 kilometres (124.4 mi) divided into the following segments:

- Upper part of Nottaway River (segment of 93.1 kilometres (57.8 mi)):
  - 13.4 kilometres (8.3 mi) to the North, crossing the South part of Soscumica Lake and collecting the waters of the discharge of "Lac de la Tourbière" (coming from North-East);
  - 37.4 kilometres (23.2 mi) to the North, then westward, across Soscumica Lake (altitude: 242.1 metres (794 ft)) to its full length; in this segment, the river collect the water of Natchiowatchouan River (coming from the Southwest);
  - 27.2 kilometres (16.9 mi) to the northwest, collecting the discharge (coming from South-West) of lakes Kawawiyekamach et Mistatikamekw, up to "Rapides des Taureaux" (river bend);
  - 15.1 kilometres (9.4 mi) to the North, bypassing Kauskatistin Island and crossing the Longs Rapides, up to "Iroquois Falls" (located at the entry of Dusaux Lake);
- Lower part of Nottaway River (segment of 107.1 kilometres (66.5 mi)):
  - 20.7 kilometres (12.9 mi) to the northwest, crossing the Dusaux Lake (convert|200|m) on it full length, collecting the Davoust River (coming from North-East), bypassing the Nestipuku Island and Michikushish Island, up to Vandry Island;
  - 18.7 kilometres (11.6 mi) to the North-West, at first bypassing Vandry Island, up to Interdite Island;
  - 21.3 kilometres (13.2 mi) collecting the water of Richerville River (coming from South-East) and Iroquois River (Nottaway River) (coming from South-East), to a narrowing of the river;
  - 11.9 kilometres (7.4 mi) to the North-West, up to Kitchigama River (coming from South East);
  - 16.7 kilometres (10.4 mi) to the North-West bypassing two large islands (including D'Herbomez Island), until the widening of the river where are rapids and archipelago;
  - 17.8 kilometres (11.1 mi) to the North-West bypassing the Kakupanchish Island, Lavoie Island and Lemoine Island, up to the mouth of the river.
- The confluence of the Nottaway River is located at:
  - 179.6 kilometres (111.6 mi) to the Northwest of downtown Matagami;
  - 33.9 kilometres (21.1 mi) South of the village of Waskaganish (Cree village municipality);
  - 91.2 kilometres (56.7 mi) to the south-east of Charlton Island in James Bay.

=== Main islands ===
(from the mouth) Lemoine Island, Lavoie Island, Kakupanchish Island, Kaminahikushach Island, Misiministikw Island, D'Herbomez Island, Des Sept Miles Island, Interdite Island (Bras Kapakusipastikuch), Vandry Island (Bras Spipastikw), Desmolier Island, Michikushish Island, Nestipuku Island, Kauskatistin Island.

=== Main rapids ===
(from the mouth) Rapides Kanutinitunanuch, rapides Kasischischiskasich, rapides Kaikunapischechuch, rapides Kachechekuch, Iroquois Falls, rapides Longs, rapides des Taureaux.

=== Tributaries ===
Major tributaries of the Nottaway River include:

- Kitchigama River
- Lake Matagami
  - Allard River
  - Bell River
    - Laflamme River
    - Mégiscane River
  - Waswanipi River
    - Chibougamau River
    - Opawica River

== Toponymy ==
In the seventeenth century, the Iroquois invaded the Algonquin territory near James Bay along this river. So when European cartographers started to map the river in the late seventeenth century, they called it "Rivière des Iroquois" (Iroquois River), as shown on maps of Jean-Baptiste-Louis Franquelin in 1699, Guillaume Delisle in 1703, and Jacques-Nicolas Bellin in 1744.

Yet various forms of "Nottaway" started to appear in the early 18th century. "Noddaways" in 1715, "Nodaway" in 1743, "Nodaoay" and "Nodway" in 1744. Geologists James Richardson and Albert Peter Low used "Notaway River" in their reports (of 1880 and 1885 respectively). The current spelling "Nottaway" was established in the early twentieth century. It is believed to have come from the Algonquin word nadowe, meaning "snake" and which the Algonquin tribes used to identify or describe their enemies, including the Iroquois. The Cree called this river Natuweu Nipi, and the Iroquois name was Nottaweou.

== See also ==
- List of longest rivers of Canada
- List of rivers of Quebec
