= Rupert Bay =

Bay in Nunavut, Canada

- Location within Quebec
- Coordinates: 51°32′N 78°58′W
- Ocean/sea sources: Hudson Bay
- Basin countries: Canada
- Max. length: 32 km (20 mi)
- Max. width: 16 km (9.9 mi)
- Surface elevation: 0 m (0 ft)

Rupert Bay is a large bay located on the south-east shore of James Bay, in Canada. Although the coast is part of the province of Quebec, the waters of the bay are under jurisdiction of the territory of Nunavut.

== Geography ==
This bay has a width of 16 km (9.9 mi) and a length of 32 km (20 mi). It is the largest arm of James Bay. The Rupert, Nottaway and Broadback Rivers empty into this bay. The Cree village of Waskaganish is on the eastern shores of the bay.
