= Baie-James =

Former municipality in Quebec, Canada

- Municipality
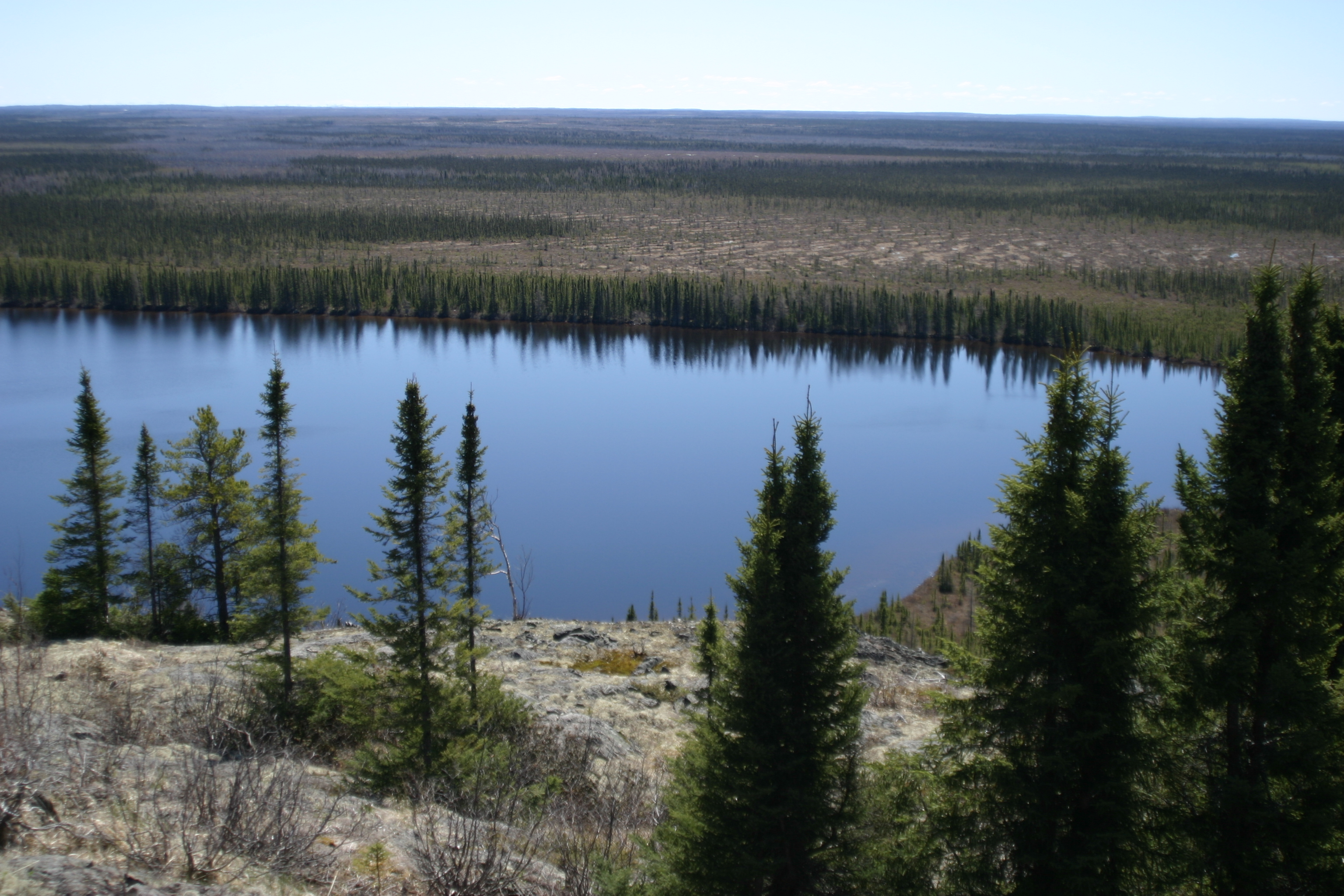
- Motto: "A territory the size of a country"
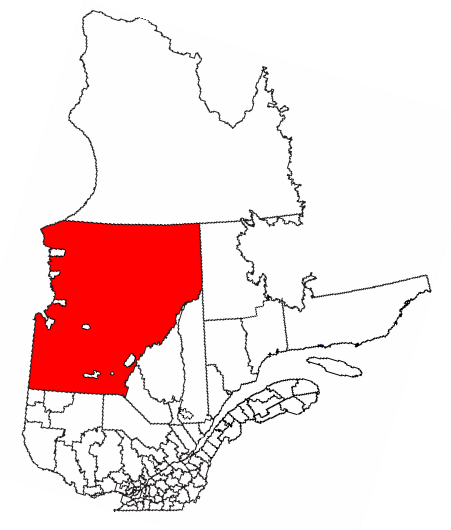
- Municipality of Baie-James, Quebec
- Coordinates: 52°00′N 76°00′W
- Country: Canada
- Province: Quebec
- Region: Nord-du-Québec
- RCM: None
- Constituted: July 14, 1971
- Dissolved: July 24, 2012

Government
  - Mayor: Gérald Lemoyne
  - Federal riding: Abitibi—Baie-James—Nunavik—Eeyou and Abitibi—Témiscamingue
  - Prov. riding: Ungava

Area
  - Total: 335,818.20 km^{2} (129,660.13 sq mi)
  - Land: 297,332.84 km^{2} (114,800.85 sq mi)

Population (2011)
  - Total: 1,303
  - Density: 0/km^{2} (0/sq mi)
  - Pop (2006–11): ▼6.5%
  - Dwellings: 701
- Time zone: UTC−05:00 (EST)
  - Summer (DST): UTC−04:00 (EDT)
- Postal code(s): J0Y
- Area code: 819
- Website: www.villembj.ca

The Baie-James (French pronunciation: [bɛ dʒɛmz]) was a former municipality in northern Quebec, Canada, which existed from 1971 to 2012. Located to the east of James Bay, Baie-James covered 297,332.84 km^{2} (114,800.85 sq mi) of land, making it the largest incorporated municipality in Canada — only eight unorganized territories were larger. Its territory almost entirely (about 98%) covered the administrative region of Jamésie, although it contained less than five percent of the population. Essentially, it was the remainder of the Jamésie Territory's land after all of the major population centres were removed.

On July 24, 2012, the Quebec government signed an accord with the Cree that would result in the abolition of Baie-James and the creation of a regional government known as Eeyou Istchee James Bay Territory.

The hydroelectric power plants of the La Grande Complex were all located within the municipal boundaries of Baie-James, making the municipality strategically important to Quebec's energy policy. Other important economic sectors are mining, softwood logging, forestry, and tourism.

== History ==
The municipality was created in 1971 and was run by the board of directors of the Société de développement de la Baie James. It managed the territory of the James Bay and Northern Quebec Agreement between the 49th and 55th parallel, with the exception of the Cree Category 1 lands and the enclaves of Chapais, Chibougamau, Lebel-sur-Quévillon and Matagami.

In December 2001, the municipal council was reformed. It became a municipality of a special type directed by the mayors of the four enclave towns, as well as the chairpersons of the local community councils of Radisson, Valcanton and Villebois. An eighth seat is reserved for a representative coming from the non-urban territory. The municipality gained additional authority and can exert certain powers as a regional county.

Under the terms of the Agreement on Governance in the Eeyou Istchee James Bay Territory of July 24, 2012, the municipality ceased to exist and was replaced by a new regional government called Eeyou Istchee James Bay Territory.

== Communities in Baie-James ==
- Beaucanton
- Desmaraisville
- Joutel
- Miquelon
- Radisson - northernmost non-native town in Quebec.
- Val-Paradis
- Valcanton
- Villebois

== Demographics ==
Canada census – Baie-James, Quebec community profile

	2011
Population	1,303 (-6.5% from 2006)
Land area	297,332.84 km^{2} (114,800.85 sq mi)
Population density	0.0/km^{2} (0/sq mi)
Median age	44.8 (M: 45.6, F: 43.4)
Private dwellings	701 (total)
Median household income	$61,770

Notes: Population in 1996: 1,978 (-35.6% from 1991) - Population in 1991: 3,073
References: 2011

== Transportation ==
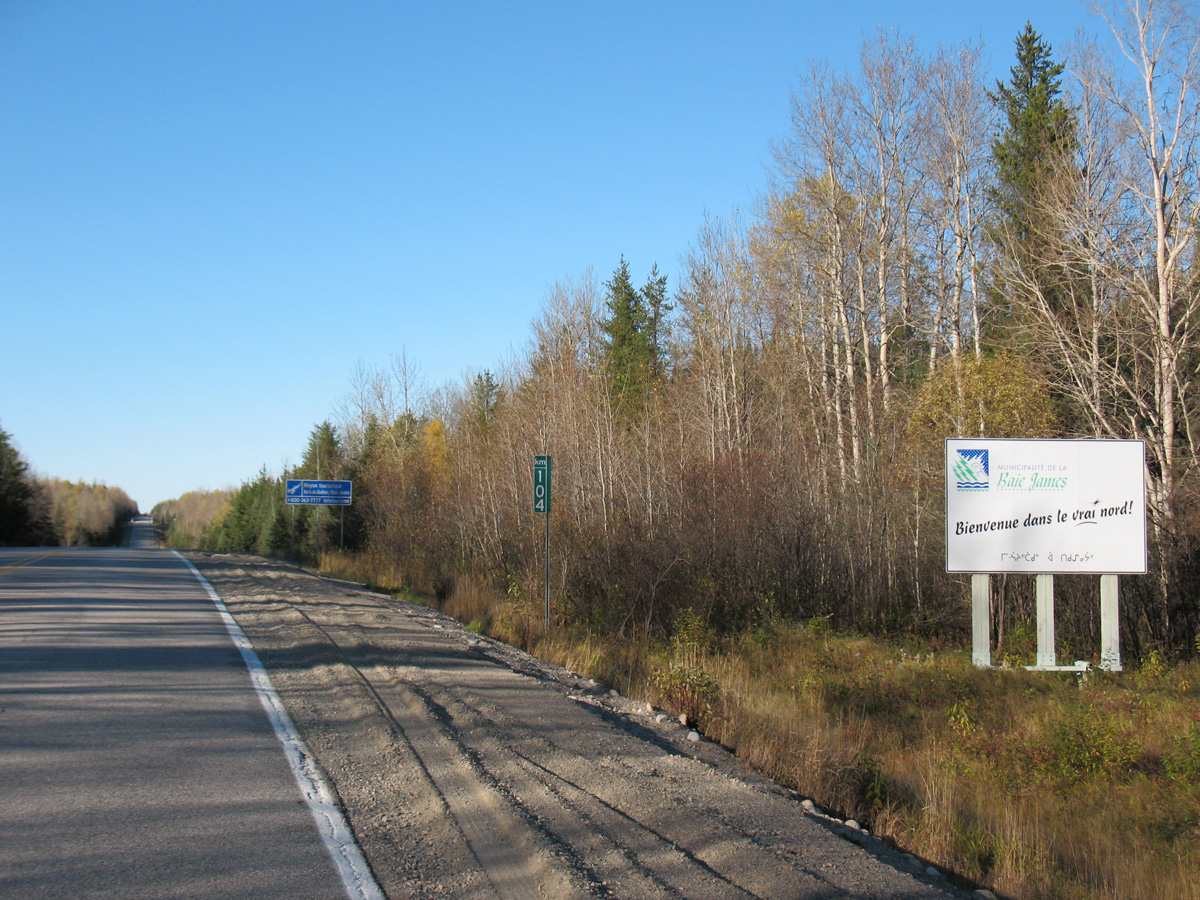
Welcome sign along Route 109

The primary roads to and within Baie-James are:

- Route 109 - provincial highway to Matagami
- Route 113 - provincial highway from Val-d'Or to Chibougamau
- Route 393 - regional highway to Val-Paradis
- James Bay Road - road from Matagami to Radisson
- North Road
- Trans-Taiga Road - access road to hydro-electric stations of the James Bay Project

Air transportation is through the La Grande Rivière Airport near Radisson, which provides scheduled air service to Montreal and Puvirnituq.

== Geography ==
Nearby lakes include Lake Naococane.
