= Matagami =

- City
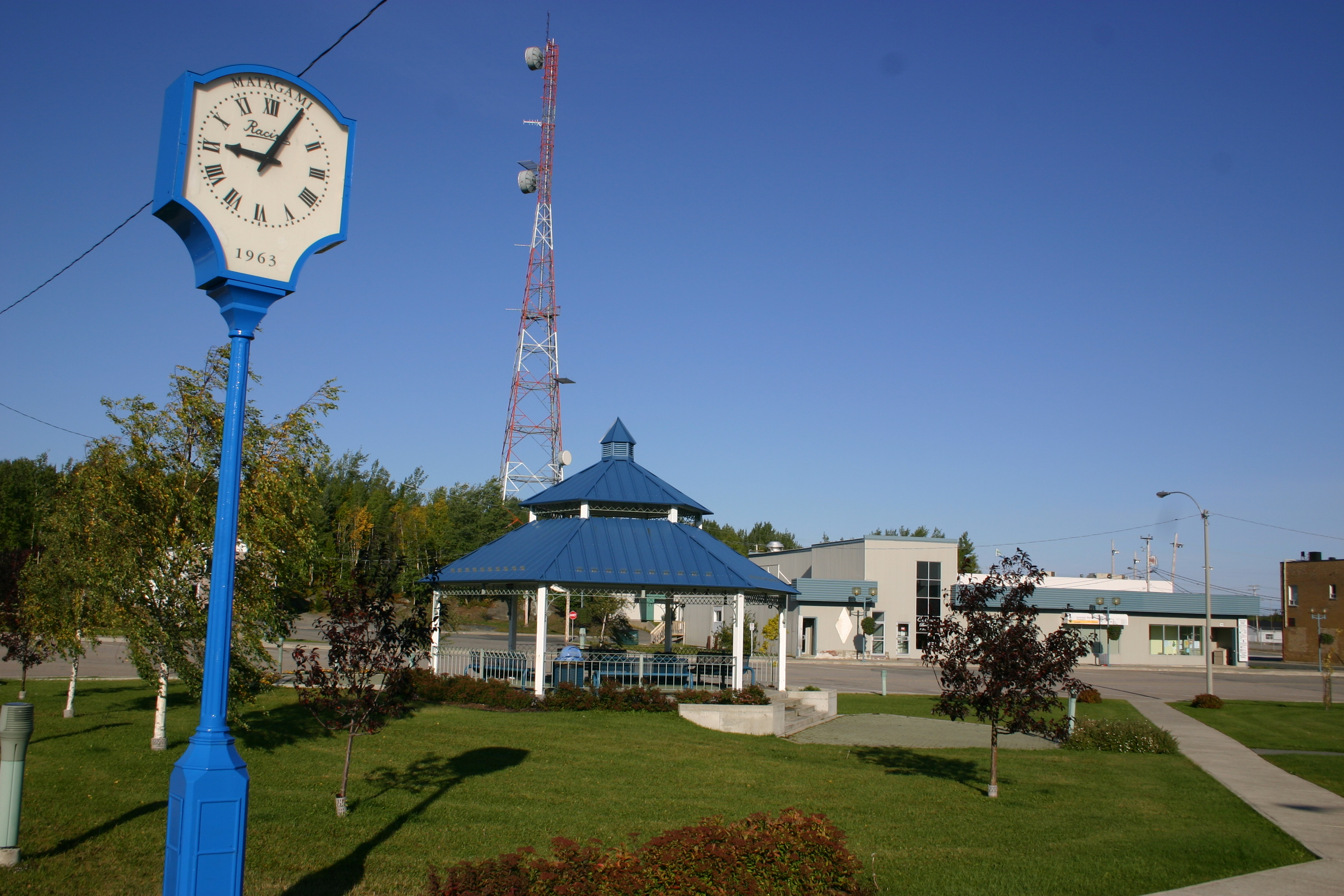
- View of Matagami

- Location within Quebec
- Coordinates (195, boulevard Matagami): 49°45′30″N 77°37′19″W
- Country: Canada
- Province: Quebec
- Region: Nord-du-Québec
- RCM: None
- Constituted: 1 April 1963

Government
  - Mayor: René Dubé
  - Federal riding: Abitibi—Baie-James—Nunavik—Eeyou
  - Prov. riding: Ungava

Area
  - City: 65.10 km^{2} (25.14 sq mi)
  - Land: 75.12 km^{2} (29.00 sq mi)
  - Urban: 1.73 km^{2} (0.67 sq mi)
- There is an apparent contradiction between two authoritative sources

Population (2021)
  - City: 1,402
  - Density: 18.7/km^{2} (48/sq mi)
  - Urban: 1,340
  - Urban density: 776.5/km^{2} (2,011/sq mi)
  - Pop (2016–21): ▼3.5%
  - Dwellings: 736
- Time zone: UTC−05:00 (EST)
  - Summer (DST): UTC−04:00 (EDT)
- Postal code(s): J0Y 2A0
- Area code: 819
- Highways: R-109
- Website: www.matagami.com

Matagami (/mətɑːɡəmi/, French pronunciation: [mataɡami]) is a small town in Quebec, Canada. It is located north of Amos, on Matagami Lake, at the northern terminus of Route 109 and the start of the James Bay Road (French: Route de la Baie James). It is enclaved within the local municipality of Eeyou Istchee James Bay, but administratively independent of it. The town had a population of 1,526 as of the Canada 2011 Census.

== History ==
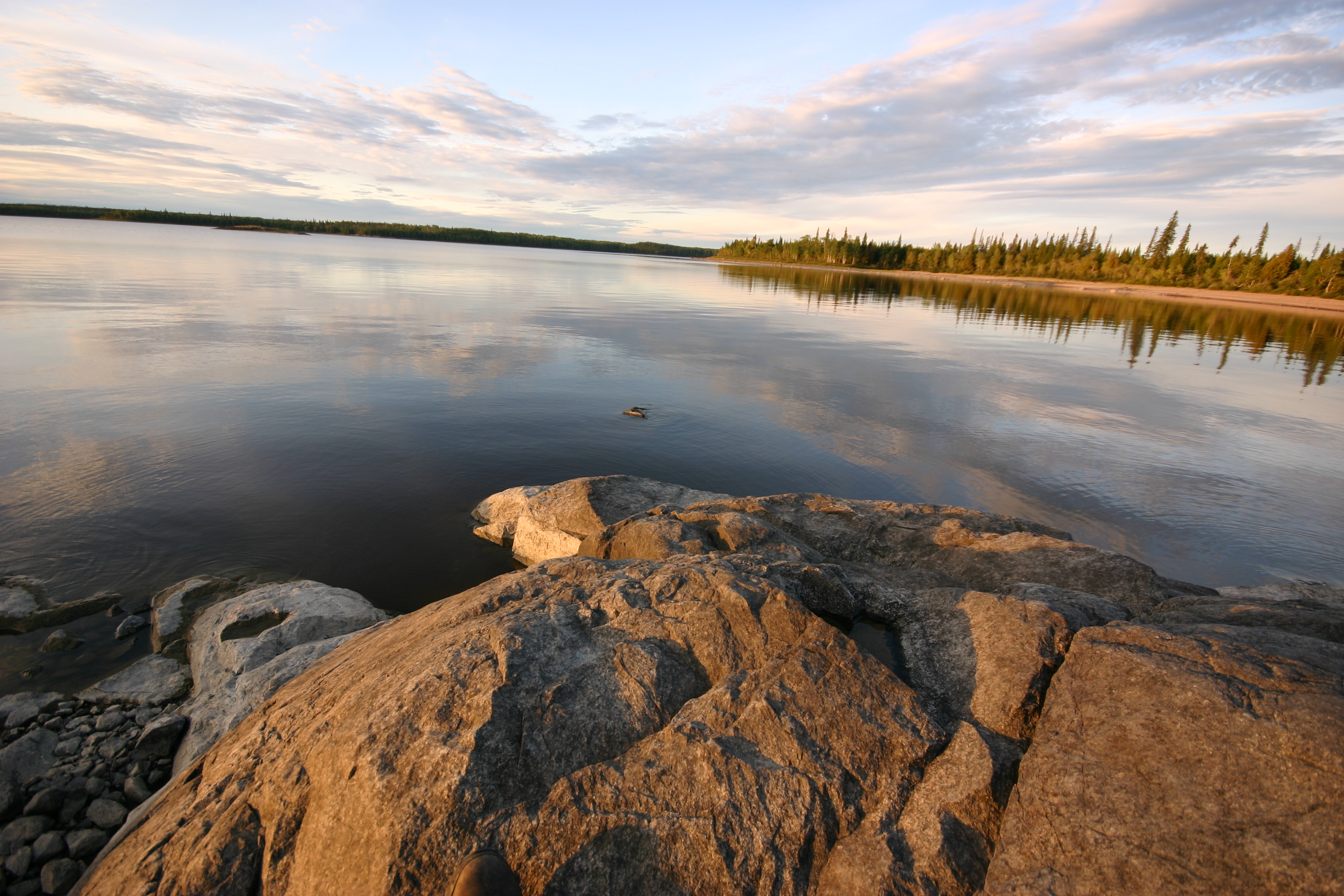
Matagami Lake

Matagami was founded in 1963 with the development of mining in the area. Previously, it existed only as a very small prospecting camp accessible only by float plane, but after a viable mineral deposit was found in the late 1950s a permanent settlement began to be established. In 1962, the Quebec Toponomy Commission attempted to name the new community Mazenod after Charles-Joseph-Eugène de Mazenod, the founder of the Missionary Oblates of Mary Immaculate, but after a public outcry by local residents the community was named after Matagami Lake.

The name Matagami means "the confluence of waters" in the Cree language.

The first church service in Matagami was held on 17 April 1962.

== Geography ==
Matagami lies in a sparsely populated area several parallels north of Montreal and Quebec City. It is located in the geographic centre of Quebec quite far to the west and on similar parallels to Winnipeg and Vancouver further west in Canada – both of which have milder climates to a certain degree. Compared to other continents, Matagami is on the same parallel as the hot Rhine shift around Mannheim in Germany, whose yearly mean temperature is about 11 °C or 20 °F hotter.

Nearby lakes include Lake Olga.

=== Climate ===
In spite of being located below the 50th parallel, Matagami has a subarctic climate (Köppen Dfc). The winter season is long and cold with a January daily mean of −20 °C (−4 °F), but summer temperatures during the short season are quite warm for subarctic climates. The cold air is dominant with 224.4 days of the year averaging air frost, while around 133 afternoons each year do not top freezing, and a full 30.5 days of the year should fall to below −30 °C (−22 °F). Around three days in summer are warm enough to reach 30 °C (86 °F), indicating a very continental climate.

Climate data for Matagami (1971–2000 normals; extremes until 2000)
Month	Jan	Feb	Mar	Apr	May	Jun	Jul	Aug	Sep	Oct	Nov	Dec	Year
Record high humidex	6.1	6.7	15.1	29.0	35.4	35.8	44.5	41.1	35.9	25.3	19.0	15.7	44.5
Record high °C (°F)	6.1 (43.0)	9.1 (48.4)	15.5 (59.9)	28.7 (83.7)	32.4 (90.3)	32.8 (91.0)	39.4 (102.9)	36.7 (98.1)	33.2 (91.8)	23.0 (73.4)	17.8 (64.0)	13.5 (56.3)	39.4 (102.9)
Mean daily maximum °C (°F)	−13.4 (7.9)	−10.2 (13.6)	−3.1 (26.4)	5.5 (41.9)	14.7 (58.5)	19.7 (67.5)	23.1 (73.6)	20.8 (69.4)	14.0 (57.2)	6.8 (44.2)	−1.2 (29.8)	−10.4 (13.3)	5.5 (41.9)
Daily mean °C (°F)	−20 (−4)	−17.3 (0.9)	−10.7 (12.7)	−1 (30)	7.7 (45.9)	12.8 (55.0)	16.1 (61.0)	14.3 (57.7)	8.8 (47.8)	2.5 (36.5)	−5.2 (22.6)	−16.1 (3.0)	−0.7 (30.7)
Mean daily minimum °C (°F)	−26.6 (−15.9)	−24.3 (−11.7)	−18.3 (−0.9)	−7.5 (18.5)	0.6 (33.1)	5.8 (42.4)	9.0 (48.2)	7.8 (46.0)	3.5 (38.3)	−1.9 (28.6)	−9.1 (15.6)	−21.8 (−7.2)	−6.9 (19.6)
Record low °C (°F)	−43.2 (−45.8)	−43.2 (−45.8)	−44.1 (−47.4)	−28.9 (−20.0)	−18.3 (−0.9)	−6 (21)	−0.6 (30.9)	−1.7 (28.9)	−5.6 (21.9)	−15.6 (3.9)	−31.3 (−24.3)	−42 (−44)	−44.1 (−47.4)
Record low wind chill	−54	−50.1	−44.9	−34.4	−21.4	−10.7	−0.9	−3.5	−9.7	−16.5	−37.2	−52.8	−54
Average precipitation mm (inches)	55.0 (2.17)	34.1 (1.34)	48.1 (1.89)	55.4 (2.18)	77.4 (3.05)	101.1 (3.98)	109.3 (4.30)	110.2 (4.34)	108.9 (4.29)	86.0 (3.39)	65.6 (2.58)	54.5 (2.15)	905.5 (35.65)
Average rainfall mm (inches)	0.7 (0.03)	2.3 (0.09)	10.5 (0.41)	24.6 (0.97)	68.9 (2.71)	99.9 (3.93)	109.3 (4.30)	110.2 (4.34)	105.1 (4.14)	58.9 (2.32)	24.4 (0.96)	3.0 (0.12)	617.7 (24.32)
Average snowfall cm (inches)	60.4 (23.8)	35.6 (14.0)	40.6 (16.0)	32.1 (12.6)	8.6 (3.4)	1.2 (0.5)	0 (0)	0 (0)	3.6 (1.4)	27.7 (10.9)	45.9 (18.1)	58.1 (22.9)	313.8 (123.5)
Average precipitation days (≥ 0.2 mm)	17.6	13.5	14.6	12.1	13.9	15.8	15.5	16.7	17.9	18.0	19.4	19.6	194.6
Average rainy days (≥ 0.2 mm)	0.50	0.72	2.8	5.7	12.1	15.6	15.5	16.7	17.5	11.9	4.8	1.2	105.0
Average snowy days (≥ 0.2 cm)	17.5	13.1	13.4	8.0	3.2	0.53	0	0	1.2	9.1	16.7	19.3	102.1
Average relative humidity (%)	67.1	61.4	55.6	54.7	50.4	52.6	52.9	56.8	65.0	68.4	75.8	73.1	61.2
Mean monthly sunshine hours	78.0	128.4	153.7	183.3	234.4	239.3	249.7	203.7	125.2	93.5	46.6	66.7	1,802.5
Source: Environment Canada (sun 1951–1980)

== Demographics ==
In the 2021 Census of Population conducted by Statistics Canada, Matagami had a population of 1,402 living in 617 of its 736 total private dwellings, a change of −3.5% from its 2016 population of 1,453. With a land area of 75.12 km^{2} (29.00 sq mi), it had a population density of 18.7/km^{2} (48.3/sq mi) in 2021.

Population trend:

- Population in 2021: 1,526 (2016 to 2021 population change: −3.5%)
- Population in 2016: 1,555
- Population in 2011: 1,526
- Population in 2006: 1,555
- Population in 2001: 1,939
- Population in 1996: 2,243
- Population in 1991: 2,467
- Population in 1986: 2,738
- Population in 1981: 3,794
- Population in 1976: 4,043
- Population in 1971: 2,411
- Population in 1966: 2,244

Mother tongue:

- English as first language: 1.8%
- French as first language: 94.6%
- English and French as first language: 0.7%
- Other as first language: 2.1%

== Economy ==
The two primary employers in the city are Xstrata and Domtar. Domtar has been in Matagami since 1988 when the company bought out Bisson & Bisson.

Xstrata entered Matagami in 2006 when it acquired Falconbridge Ltd. In 2008, Xstrata put Perseverance, a zinc-copper volcanogenic massive sulfide ore deposit, into production. Perseverance has a mine life of 5.5 years. Since 1957 ten deposits, including the world class Matagami Lake deposit (25.6 million tonnes grading 8.2% Zn, 0.56% Cu, 20.91 g/t Ag, 0.41 g/t Au), have been discovered and mined out for a total of "44.4 million tonnes with a similar average grade."

Further exploration is continuing in the camp through a 50–50 joint venture agreement between Xstrata and Donner Metals. In late 2008, Donner Metals Ltd. announced that Xstrata Zinc Canada was in the process of completing a scoping study at their jointly owned Bracemac-McLeod property. It is the nearest city to the Lac Doré Vanadium Deposit.

The community is also one of the distribution points for goods and services to the James Bay Hydroelectric Project. As well, Matagami has a small tourism industry due to the popularity of fishing and hunting in northern Quebec. Hotel Matagami and motel caribou include full-service bars.

== Government ==
=== Police and crime ===
Policing in Matagami is done by the Surete du Quebec.

== Media ==
Matagami is served by a community radio station, CHEF-FM, as well as by a rebroadcaster of Première Chaîne's CHLM-FM.

== Notable people ==
- Marianne Limpert, won the silver medal in the 200m Individual Medley at the 1996 Summer Olympics, born in Matagami
- Lorne Stamler, former NHL Hockey Player, graduated from Galinee High School in Matagami, Quebec, in 1969
