= Lake Poncheville =

Lake in Nord-du-Québec, Quebec, Canada

- Watershed of Nottaway River

- Location within Quebec
- Location: Eeyou Istchee James Bay Regional Government, Quebec
- Coordinates: 50°09′20″N 76°57′33″W
- Type: Natural
- Basin countries: Canada
- Max. length: 37.1 kilometres (23.1 mi)
- Max. width: 7.7 kilometres (4.8 mi)
- Surface elevation: 269 metres (883 ft)

Lake Poncheville is a freshwater body in of Eeyou Istchee Baie-James (municipality), in the administrative region of Nord-du-Québec, in the province of Quebec, in Canada. The southern part of the lake is part of the townships of Des Combes and Grandfontaine.

Forestry is the main economic activity of the sector. Recreational tourism activities come second, thanks to a navigable body of water of a length of 60.9 kilometres (37.8 mi), connecting the lakes Opataouaga, "Lac de la Hauteur des Terres" (English: Lac Lake of the Height of the Lands) and Poncheville Lake. In addition, the Quénonisca Lake (located to the north) of a length of 52.1 kilometres (32.4 mi) offers another navigable body of water that connects to the Broadback River.

The Poncheville Lake watershed is accessible via a forest road (east-west direction) from the west connecting the road to the north.

The surface of Poncheville Lake is usually frozen from early November to mid-May, however, safe ice circulation is generally from mid-November to mid-April.

== Geography ==
This lake has a length of 37.1 kilometres (23.1 mi) in the form of an inverted hook, a maximum width of 7.7 kilometres (4.8 mi) and an altitude of 269 metres (883 ft). This lake has two large bays rising in the eastern shore on 14.4 kilometres (8.9 mi) (the southern one) and on 13.4 kilometres (8.3 mi) (the northern one).

The Poncheville River (tributary of Maicasagi Lake) runs south-west across Poncheville Lake in a longitudinal direction.

Lake Poncheville obtains supplies from the west side through the Ouescapis Lake and East by the outlet of the "Lac de la Hauteur des Terres" (English: Lake of the Height of the Lands) which flows at the bottom of a bay stretching to the North-East on 5.3 kilometres (3.3 mi).

The mouth of this Poncheville Lake is located in the North and is directly connected to Opataouaga Lake by the Sable Strait (length: 7.5 kilometres (4.7 mi)). This mouth is located at the bottom of a bay, at:

- 10.9 kilometres (6.8 mi) South of the mouth of Opataouaga Lake;
- 56 kilometres (35 mi) south of the mouth of Quénonisca Lake (confluence with Broadback River);
- 90.0 kilometres (55.9 mi) southeast of the mouth of Evans Lake;
- 202 kilometres (126 mi) east of the mouth of the Broadback River (confluence with Rupert Bay);
- 119 kilometres (74 mi) north-east of downtown Matagami;
- 53.4 kilometres (33.2 mi) northwest of the village center of Waswanipi.

The main hydrographic slopes near Poncheville Lake are:

- North side: Opataouaga Lake, Quénonisca Lake, Salamandre Lake (Broadback River);
- East side: Chensagi River West, Chensagi River East, Chensagi River, Maicasagi River;
- South side: Canet River, Waswanipi River, Goéland Lake (Waswanipi River), Olga Lake (Waswanipi River), Matagami Lake;
- West side: Ouescapis Lake, Muskiki River, Soscumica Lake, Nottaway River.

== Toponymy ==
This body of water is indicated on a map of 1898 under the name "Opitawakan L.". This term of Algonquin origin or cree would mean "lake of high place". The elevation of the lake is 12 metres (39 ft) higher than the surface of Quénonisca Lake which is located downstream.

A cartographic document of 1911 refers to this body of water under the name of "Lady Beatrix Lake", name of one of the two daughters of the Marquis de Lansdowne, Governor General of Canada from 1883 to 1888. This place name will remain in the documents until 1963, while a new toponym was officialized that evokes the Canon Charles Thellier of Poncheville (1875-1956). Coming from a family of old nobility, Poncheville is born in Valenciennes.

He was ordained a priest in Lille in 1900. This pioneer of social Catholicism first came to Montreal, during the Eucharistic Congress of 1910. Military chaplain during the Great War (1914-1918), he was present in 1916, at the battle of Verdun. Subsequently, he will return to Canada several times, including in 1917, to preach Lent at Notre-Dame Basilica in Montreal. Ardent defender of our country in France, Poncheville has published many sermons and religious works as well as some articles on French Canada. The name "Lac Poncheville" was made official on December 5, 1968 by the Commission de toponymie du Québec when it was created.

== See also ==
- James Bay
- Rupert Bay
- Broadback River, a watercourse
- Evans Lake, a body of water
- Quénonisca Lake, a body of water
- Opataouaga Lake, a body of water
- Ouescapis Lake, a body of water
- Eeyou Istchee Baie-James (municipality), a municipality
- List of lakes in Canada
