= Mildred River =

Mildred
- Watershed of Nottaway River

Location
- Country: Canada
- Province: Quebec
- Region: Eeyou Istchee Baie-James (municipality)

Physical characteristics
- Source: Wiki Lake
  - location: Eeyou Istchee Baie-James (municipality), Nord-du-Québec, Quebec
  - coordinates: 50°11′12″N 75°12′45″W
  - elevation: 365 m (1,198 ft)
- Mouth: La Trêve Lake
  - location: Eeyou Istchee Baie-James (municipality), Quebec
  - coordinates: 49°58′04″N 75°33′13″W
  - elevation: 337 m (1,106 ft)
- Length: 53.4 km (33.2 mi)

The Mildred River is a tributary of La Trêve Lake, flowing in regional County Municipality (RCM) of Eeyou Istchee James Bay (municipality), in the administrative region of Nord-du-Québec, Canadian province of Quebec, in Canada.

The lower section of the Mildred River flows successively through the townships of Turgis, Julien, Lantagnac and Guettard.

The hydrographic slope of the Mildred River is accessible on road 113 linking Lebel-sur-Quévillon to Chibougamau. This route passes South of the mouth of the Mildred River and passes South of La Trêve Lake and Inconnu Lake.

The surface of the Mildred River is usually frozen from early November to mid-May, however, safe ice movement is generally from mid-November to mid-April.

== Geography ==
The main hydrographic slopes adjacent to the Mildred River are:

- North side: Caupichigau River, Caupichigau Lake, Omo River, Capichigamau Lake, Monsan River;
- East side: Chibougamau River, Brock River;
- South side: Chibougamau River, La Trêve Lake, Obatogamau River;
- West side: Maicasagi River, La Trêve River, Caupichigau River.

The Mildred River rises at the mouth of a Wiki Lake (length: 1.4 kilometres (0.87 mi); altitude: 365 metres (1,198 ft)). The mouth of this head lake is located at:

- 6.5 kilometres (4.0 mi) South of the southern boundary of the Assinica Wildlife Sanctuary;
- 37.2 kilometres (23.1 mi) Northeast of the mouth of the Mildred River (confluence with La Trêve Lake);
- 56.6 kilometres (35.2 mi) Northeast of the mouth of the La Trêve River (confluence with the Maicasagi River);
- 107.5 kilometres (66.8 mi) Northeast of the mouth of the Maicasagi River (confluence with Maicasagi Lake);
- 138.1 kilometres (85.8 mi) Northeast of the mouth of Goéland Lake (Waswanipi River);
- 178.1 kilometres (110.7 mi) Northeast of the mouth of Matagami Lake;
- 320 kilometres (200 mi) Southeast of the mouth of the Nottaway River;
- 193.8 kilometres (120.4 mi) North of downtown Matagami

From Mildred River, the Mildred River flows over 53.4 kilometres (33.2 mi) according to the following segments:

- 4.9 kilometres (3.0 mi) westerly in Turgis Township to a small bay on the Northeastern shore of Lake Turgis;
- 3.1 kilometres (1.9 mi) southwesterly to the bottom of a bay southeast of Lac aux Quatre Cornices;
- 3.7 kilometres (2.3 mi) to the west, crossing the Lake at Four Corners (length: 4.3 kilometres (2.7 mi); altitude: 353 metres (1,158 ft));
- 10.1 kilometres (6.3 mi) to the South, crossing at the end of the segment the "Lac des Petites Plages" (length: 5.5 kilometres (3.4 mi); altitude: 342 metres (1,122 ft));
- 9.2 kilometres (5.7 mi) southwesterly, then West crossing Lake Thomelet (length: 7.5 kilometres (4.7 mi); altitude: 339 metres (1,112 ft)) at the end of the segment;
- 9.8 kilometres (6.1 mi) southwesterly to the northeastern boundary of Mildred Lake;
- 5.2 kilometres (3.2 mi) southwesterly, crossing Mildred Lake (elevation: 337 metres (1,106 ft)) on its full length;
- 3.3 kilometres (2.1 mi) South to mouth.

The "Mildred River" flows into a river bend on the Northeastern shore of the La Trêve River. From there, it flows Northwest to the Southeast bank of the Maicasagi River. The current flows westward to the East shore of Maicasagi Lake. Then the current flows southwesterly through the Max Passage into the Goéland Lake. The latter is crossed to the northwest by the Waswanipi River which is a tributary of Matagami Lake.

The mouth of the Mildred River located at:

- 5.8 kilometres (3.6 mi) Northeast of the mouth of La Trêve Lake;
- 25.9 kilometres (16.1 mi) East of the mouth of the La Trêve River (confluence with the Maicasagi River);
- 72 kilometres (45 mi) Northeast of the mouth of the Maicasagi River (confluence with Maicasagi Lake);
- 98.8 kilometres (61.4 mi) Northeast of the mouth of Goéland Lake (Waswanipi River);
- 118.4 kilometres (73.6 mi) Northeast of the mouth of Olga Lake (Waswanipi River);
- 37.7 kilometres (23.4 mi) Northeast of the village center of Waswanipi;
- 151 kilometres (94 mi) Northeast of downtown Matagami.

== Toponymy ==
The toponym "Mildred River" was formalized on December 5, 1968, at the Commission de toponymie du Québec, i.e. at the creation of this commission

== See also ==
- James Bay
- Rupert Bay
- Nottaway River, a watercourse
- Matagami Lake, a body of water
- Waswanipi River, a watercourse
- Goéland Lake (Waswanipi River), a body of water
- Maicasagi Lake, a body of water
- Maicasagi River, a watercourse
- La Trêve River, a watercourse
- List of rivers of Quebec
