= Caupichigau Lake =

- Watershed of Nottaway River

- Location within Quebec
- Location: Baie-James
- Coordinates: 50°05′35″N 75°34′23″W
- Type: Natural
- Primary inflows: Naomi creek
- Primary outflows: Caupichigau River
- Basin countries: Canada
- Max. length: 13.4 kilometres (8.3 mi)
- Max. width: 2.6 kilometres (1.6 mi)
- Surface area: 10 kilometres (6.2 mi)
- Surface elevation: 335 metres (1,099 ft)

Caupichigau Lake is a freshwater body of the southern part of Eeyou Istchee James Bay (municipality), in the administrative region of Nord-du-Québec, in the province of Quebec, in Canada.

The surface of the lake is largely in the townships of Berey and Daine. Forestry is the main economic activity of the sector. Recreational tourism activities come second.

The hydrographic slope of Lake Caupichigau is accessible through the road 113 which link Lebel-sur-Quevillon to Chibougamau. The surface of Lake Caupichigau is usually frozen from early November to mid-May, however, safe ice circulation is generally from mid-November to mid-April.

== Geography ==
This lake formed in length has a length of 14.3 kilometres (8.9 mi), a maximum width of 2.6 kilometres (1.6 mi) and an altitude of 335 metres (1,099 ft). It is fed to the Northeast by the outlet of Lake Ruth.

The mouth of Lake Caupichigau is located at the bottom of a bay on the north-west side, at:

- 10.7 kilometres (6.6 mi) Northeast of the mouth of the Caupichigau River;
- 19.1 kilometres (11.9 mi) Northeast of the mouth of the La Trêve River (confluence with the Maicasagi River);
- 68.3 kilometres (42.4 mi) Northeast of the mouth of the Maicasagi River (confluence with Maicasagi Lake);
- 98.0 kilometres (60.9 mi) Northeast of the mouth of Goéland Lake (Waswanipi River);
- 116.7 kilometres (72.5 mi) Northeast of the mouth of Olga Lake (Waswanipi River);
- 42.9 kilometres (26.7 mi) Northeast of the village center of Waswanipi;
- 150 kilometres (93 mi) Northeast of downtown Matagami;
- 138 kilometres (86 mi) Northeast of the mouth of Matagami Lake.

The main hydrographic slopes near Lake Caupichigau are:

- North side: Omo River (Quebec), Omo Lake, Caupichigam Lake;
- East side: Mildred River, Brock River (Chibougamau River), Chibougamau River;
- South side: Chibougamau River, La Trêve River, La Trêve Lake;
- West side: La Trêve River, Maicasagi River.

The main hydrographic slopes near Lake Caupichigau are:

- North side: Omo River (Quebec), Omo Lake, Caupichigam Lake;
- East side: Mildred River, Brock River (Chibougamau River), Chibougamau River;
- South side: Chibougamau River, La Trêve River, La Trêve Lake;
- West side: La Trêve River, Maicasagi River.

== Toponymy ==
This hydronym is indicated on the sheet of the topographic series Mistassini, in 1945.

The toponym "Lac Caupichigau" was formalized on December 5, 1968, by the Commission de toponymie du Québec when it was created.

== See also ==
- James Bay
- Rupert Bay
- Nottaway River, a watercourse
- Matagami Lake, a body of water
- Waswanipi River, a watercourse
- Maicasagi Lake, a watercourse
- Caupichigau River, a watercourse
- Eeyou Istchee Baie-James (municipality), a municipality
- List of lakes in Canada
