= Inconnue River (Maicasagi River tributary) =

Inconnue
- Watershed of Nottaway River

Location
- Country: Canada
- Province: Quebec
- Region: Eeyou Istchee Baie-James (municipality)

Physical characteristics
- Source: Lake La Ribourde
  - location: Eeyou Istchee Baie-James (municipality), Nord-du-Québec, Quebec
  - coordinates: 49°52′43″N 75°43′49″W
  - elevation: 341.7 m (1,121 ft)
- Mouth: Maicasagi River
  - location: Eeyou Istchee Baie-James (municipality), Nord-du-Québec, Quebec
  - coordinates: 49°57′44″N 76°16′04″W
  - elevation: 268 m (879 ft)
- Length: 68.5 km (42.6 mi)

Basin features
- Tributaries
  - left: Nomans River
  - right: Colette creek

The Inconnue River (French: Rivière Inconnue) is a tributary of the Maicasagi River located in the municipality of Eeyou Istchee Baie-James, in the administrative region of Nord-du-Québec, in the Canadian province of Quebec, in Canada.

The course of the Inconnue River crosses the townships of Ribourde, Daine, Krieghoff, Montalambert, La Rouvillière and Monseignat.

The hydrographic slope of Inconnue River is served by a secondary road along the North shore of the Waswanipi River and separating from Road 113 connecting Lebel-sur-Quévillon to Chibougamau; as well as by the secondary road R1018 (North-South direction) coming from Matagami and which crosses the Maicasagi River at 14.7 kilometres (9.1 mi) of its mouth.

The surface of the Inconnue River is usually frozen from early November to mid-May, however, safe ice movement is generally from mid-November to mid-April.

== Geography ==
The main hydrographic slopes near the Inconnue River are:

- North side: Yapuouichi Lake, Maicasagi River, Huguette Creek, La Trêve River;
- East side: La Trêve Lake, La Trêve River, Caupichigau River, Chibougamau River;
- South side: Waswanipi River, Lake Waswanipi;
- West side: Goéland Lake (Waswanipi River), Waswanipi River, Nomans River.

The Inconnue River originates at the mouth of Lac La Ribourde (length: 4.2 kilometres (2.6 mi) altitude: 335 metres (1,099 ft)). This lake is connected to Daine Lake on the east side. This source of the river is located at:

- 70 kilometres (43 mi) East of the mouth of the Maicasagi River (confluence with Maicasagi Lake);
- 15.6 kilometres (9.7 mi) North of a curve of the Chibougamau River;
- 39.8 kilometres (24.7 mi) Southeast of the mouth of the Inconnue River (confluence with the Maicasagi River);
- 87.4 kilometres (54.3 mi) Northeast of the mouth of Goéland Lake (Waswanipi River);
- 131.1 kilometres (81.5 mi) Northeast of the mouth of Matagami Lake;
- 277 kilometres (172 mi) Southeast of the mouth of the Nottaway River);
- 139.5 kilometres (86.7 mi) North of downtown Matagami

From the mouth of the head lake, the "Inconnue River" flows over 68.5 kilometres (42.6 mi) according to the following segments:

Upper part of the Inconnue River (segment of 35.8 kilometres (22.2 mi))

- 12.1 kilometres (7.5 mi) East, crossing the Inconnue Lake (elevation: 334 metres (1,096 ft)) on its full length;
- 9.8 kilometres (6.1 mi) Southwesterly winding to the eastern limit of the township of Montalembert;
- 7.8 kilometres (4.8 mi) Westerly in Montalembert Township, to the Eastern shore of Capisisit Lake;
- 6.1 kilometres (3.8 mi) Westerly across Capisisit Lake (elevation: 307 metres (1,007 ft)) on its full length;

Lower part of the Inconnue River (segment of 32.7 kilometres (20.3 mi))

- 7.1 kilometres (4.4 mi) towards the west, to the eastern limit of the township of Rouvillière;
- 5.4 kilometres (3.4 mi) Southwesterly to the confluence of a creek (from the southeast);
- 13.4 kilometres (8.3 mi) West, then North, to the confluence of the Nomans River (coming from the West);
- 6.8 kilometres (4.2 mi) North to mouth.

The "Inconnue River" flows to the south bank of the Maicasagi River flowing west to the East shore of Maicasagi Lake. Then the current flows Southwest through the Max Passage into the Goéland Lake. The latter is crossed to the northwest by the Waswanipi River which is a tributary of Matagami Lake.

The mouth of the Rivière Inconnue located at:

- 20.6 kilometres (12.8 mi) Northeast of the mouth of the Maicasagi River (confluence with Maicasagi Lake);
- 48.4 kilometres (30.1 mi) Northeast of the mouth of Goéland Lake (Waswanipi River);
- 67.5 kilometres (41.9 mi) Northeast of the mouth of Olga Lake (Waswanipi River);
- 38.2 kilometres (23.7 mi) Northwest of the village center of Waswanipi;
- 100.6 kilometres (62.5 mi) North of downtown Matagami

== Toponymy ==
The toponym "Rivière Inconnue" was officialized on December 5, 1968, at the Commission de toponymie du Québec, i.e. at the creation of this commission

== See also ==
- List of rivers of Quebec
