= Monsan River =

Monsan
- Watershed of Nottaway River

Location
- Country: Canada
- Province: Quebec
- Region: Eeyou Istchee Baie-James (municipality)

Physical characteristics
- Source: Little unidentified lake
  - location: Eeyou Istchee Baie-James (municipality), Nord-du-Québec, Quebec
  - coordinates: 50°25′23″N 75°48′14″W
  - elevation: 371 m (1,217 ft)
- Mouth: Maicasagi River, Monsan Lake
  - location: Eeyou Istchee Baie-James (municipality), Nord-du-Québec, Quebec
  - coordinates: 50°15′01″N 75°51′07″W
  - elevation: 323 m (1,060 ft)
- Length: 23.1 km (14.4 mi)

The Monsan River is a tributary of Lake Monsan which is crossed by the Maicasagi River located at Eeyou Istchee Baie-James (municipality), in the administrative region of Nord-du-Québec, in the Canadian province of Quebec, in Canada.

The course of the Monsan River is entirely in the Southwestern part of the Assinica Wildlife Sanctuary.

The hydrographic slope of the Monsan River is served by a secondary road along the north shore of the Waswanipi River and separating from road 113 connecting Lebel-sur-Quévillon to Chibougamau and passing in Waswanipi.

The surface of the Monsan River is usually frozen from early November to mid-May, however, safe ice movement is generally from mid-November to mid-April.

== Geography ==
The main hydrographic slopes near the Monsan River are:

- North side: Lucky Strike Creek, Assinica River, Broadback River;
- East side: Lake Capichigau, Caupichigau River, Omo River;
- South side: Maicasagi River, Caupichigau River, La Trêve River, Omo River;
- West side: Lake Rocher, Maicasagi River, Nipukatasi River, Chensagi River.

The Monsan River rises at the mouth of a small unidentified lake (length: 0.4 kilometres (0.25 mi) altitude: 371 metres (1,217 ft)). This source of the river is located at:

- 21 kilometres (13 mi) North of the mouth of the Monsan River (confluence with Lake Monsan);
- 78.6 kilometres (48.8 mi) Northeast of the mouth of the Maicasagi River (confluence with Maicasagi Lake);
- 33.9 kilometres (21.1 mi) North of the mouth of the Omo River (confluence with the Maicasagi River);
- 106.8 kilometres (66.4 mi) Northeast of the mouth of Goéland Lake (Waswanipi River);
- 134.3 kilometres (83.5 mi) Northeast of the mouth of Matagami Lake;
- Southeast of the mouth of the Nottaway River);
- 154.7 kilometres (96.1 mi) Northeast of downtown Matagami.

From the head lake, the "Monsan River" flows on 23.1 kilometres (14.4 mi) according to the following segments:

- 4.3 kilometres (2.7 mi) South, crossing an unidentified lake (length: 2.3 kilometres (1.4 mi); altitude: 354 metres (1,161 ft)), up to the mouth;
- 4.0 kilometres (2.5 mi) Southeast, crossing an unidentified lake (length: 0.7 kilometres (0.43 mi); altitude: 337 metres (1,106 ft)), up to at its mouth;
- 1.4 kilometres (0.87 mi) South to a creek (coming from the northeast);
- 13.4 kilometres (8.3 mi) South, then southwest, to the mouth.

The Monsan River flows on the Northeast shore of Lake Monsan, which is crossed to the Southeast by the Maicasagi River. From there, it flows Southeast, Southwest, and West to the East shore of Maicasagi Lake. Then the current flows Southwest through the Max Passage into the Goéland Lake. The latter is crossed to the Northwest by the Waswanipi River which is a tributary of Matagami Lake.

The mouth of the Monsan River located at:

- 3.8 kilometres (2.4 mi) North of the mouth of Moisan Lake;
- 60.0 kilometres (37.3 mi) Northeast of the mouth of the Maicasagi River (confluence with Maicasagi Lake);
- 89.1 kilometres (55.4 mi) Northeast of the mouth of Goéland Lake (Waswanipi River);
- 105.8 kilometres (65.7 mi) Northeast of the mouth of Olga Lake (Waswanipi River);
- 59.6 kilometres (37.0 mi) North of the village center of Waswanipi;
- 139.4 kilometres (86.6 mi) North of downtown Matagami

== Toponymy ==
The term "Monsan" is a family name of French origin.

The toponym "Monsan River" was formalized on December 5, 1968, at the Commission de toponymie du Québec, i.e. at the creation of this commission

== See also ==
- James Bay
- Rupert Bay
- Nottaway River, a watercourse
- Matagami Lake, a body of water
- Waswanipi River, a watercourse
- Goéland Lake (Waswanipi River), a body of water
- Maicasagi Lake, a body of water
- Maicasagi River, a watercourse
- Assinica Wildlife Sanctuary
- List of rivers of Quebec
