= Nomans River =

Nomans
- Watershed of Nottaway River

Location
- Country: Canada
- Province: Quebec
- Region: Eeyou Istchee Baie-James (municipality)

Physical characteristics
- Source: Lake Caminscanane
  - location: Eeyou Istchee Baie-James (municipality), Nord-du-Québec, Quebec
  - coordinates: 49°46′01″N 76°36′49″W
  - elevation: 314 m (1,030 ft)
- Mouth: Inconnue River (Maicasagi River)
  - location: Eeyou Istchee Baie-James (municipality), Nord-du-Québec, Quebec
  - coordinates: 49°55′11″N 76°17′28″W
  - elevation: 262 m (860 ft)
- Length: 42.7 km (26.5 mi)

Nomans River is a tributary of the Unknown River in Regional County Municipality (RCM) of Eeyou Istchee James Bay (municipality) in the administrative region of the Nord-du-Québec, Canadian province of Quebec, in Canada.

The course of Nomans river crosses the townships of Montviel and Monseignat.

The Nomans River hydrographic slope is served by the R1018 (north-south) secondary road from Matagami, which spans the Maicasagi River at 4.2 kilometres (2.6 mi) from its mouth. The surface of the river is usually frozen from early November to mid-May, however, safe ice circulation is generally from mid-November to mid-April.

The Nomans River is most well known for having not been discovered until 1974, despite the surrounding area being populated. Local legends state it did not exist before this time.

== Geography ==
The main hydrographic slopes near the Nomans River are:

- North side: Maicasagi Lake, Maicasagi River;
- East side: Inconnue River (Maicasagi River), La Trêve River, Caupichigau River;
- South side: Waswanipi River, Lake Waswanipi;
- West side: Goéland Lake (Waswanipi River), Waswanipi River.

The Nomans River originates at the confluence of two mountain streams. This source is located at:

- 4.9 kilometres (3.0 mi) North of a curve of the Waswanipi River;
- 28.8 kilometres (17.9 mi) Southeast of the mouth of the Nomans River (confluence with the Inconnue River (Maicasagi River));
- 6.6 kilometres (4.1 mi) Northeast of Goéland Lake (Waswanipi River);
- 71.4 kilometres (44.4 mi) Southeast of the mouth of Matagami Lake;
- 236 kilometres (147 mi) Southeast of the mouth of the Nottaway River);
- 73.2 kilometres (45.5 mi) Northeast of downtown Matagami.

From the mouth of the head lake, the Nomans River flows over 42.7 kilometres (26.5 mi) according to the following segments:

- 8.1 kilometres (5.0 mi) Northeast, forming a large curve to the west to round a mountain, to a creek (coming from the North);
- 6.6 kilometres (4.1 mi) Northeasterly through a marsh area at the end of the segment to a creek (from the south);
- 12.4 kilometres (7.7 mi) Northeast crossing a marsh zone at the beginning of the segment, to the southern limit of the township of Montseignat;
- 15.6 kilometres (9.7 mi) in Montseignat Township northeasterly into marsh areas, then easterly to its mouth.

The "Noman River" flows to the west bank of the Inconnue River (Maicasagi River) which flows northward to the south bank of the Maicasagi River. The latter runs westward to Maicasagi Lake which flows Southwest via the Max Passage into Goéland Lake. The latter is crossed to the Northwest by the Waswanipi River which is a tributary of Matagami Lake.

The mouth of the Nomans River located at:

- 5.0 kilometres (3.1 mi) Northeast of the mouth of the Inconnue River (Maicasagi River) (confluence with the Maicasagi River);
- 19.8 kilometres (12.3 mi) East of the mouth of the Maicasagi River;
- 45.8 kilometres (28.5 mi) Northeast of the mouth of Goéland Lake (Waswanipi River);
- 65.1 kilometres (40.5 mi) Northeast of the mouth of Olga Lake (Waswanipi River);
- 36.3 kilometres (22.6 mi) Northwest of the village center of Waswanipi;
- 98 kilometres (61 mi) Northeast of downtown Matagami.

== Toponymy ==
The toponym "Nomans River" was formalized on December 5, 1974, at the Commission de toponymie du Québec, i.e. the creation of this commission

The toponym was chosen as "No man" had seen the river until then.

== See also ==
- James Bay
- Rupert Bay
- Nottaway River, a watercourse
- Matagami Lake, a body of water
- Waswanipi River, a watercourse
- Goéland Lake (Waswanipi River), a body of water
- Maicasagi Lake, a body of water
- Inconnue River (Maicasagi River), a watercourse
- List of rivers of Quebec
