= Chensagi River West =

Chensagi West
- Watershed of Nottaway River

Location
- Country: Canada
- Province: Quebec
- Region: Eeyou Istchee Baie-James (municipality)

Physical characteristics
- Source: Unidentified lake in mountain
  - location: Eeyou Istchee Baie-James (municipality), Nord-du-Québec, Quebec
  - coordinates: 50°17′37″N 76°38′38″W
  - elevation: 287 m (942 ft)
- Mouth: Chensagi River
  - location: Eeyou Istchee Baie-James (municipality), Nord-du-Québec, Quebec
  - coordinates: 50°08′21″N 76°36′57″W
  - elevation: 262 m (860 ft)
- Length: 48.4 km (30.1 mi)

The Chensagi River West is a tributary of the Chensagi River, in Regional County Municipality (RCM) of Eeyou Istchee James Bay (municipality), in the area of the Nord-du-Québec, Canadian province of Quebec, in Canada. The lower part of the river runs through the township of Dambourges.

The Chensagi River West hydrographic slope is served by the northward secondary road from Matagami passing on the west bank of the course of the West Chensagi River; another forest road from the South spans on the East bank. The surface of the river is usually frozen from early November to mid-May, however, safe ice circulation is generally from mid-November to mid-April.

== Geography ==
The main hydrographic slopes near the Chensagi West River are:

- North side: Opataouaga Lake, Quenosisca Lake, Rocher Lake, Broadback River;
- East side: Chensagi River, Chensagi River East;
- South side: Chensagi River, Maicasagi Lake, Maicasagi River;
- West side: Height of Lands Lake, Chensagi Lake, Poncheville Lake.

The Chensagi River originates at the mouth of a small unidentified lake (length: 2.1 kilometres (1.3 mi); altitude: 287 metres (942 ft)).

The mouth of this head lake is located at:

- 5.9 kilometres (3.7 mi) Southeast of Opataouaga Lake;
- 17.3 kilometres (10.7 mi) North of the mouth of the West Chensagi River;
- 30.4 kilometres (18.9 mi) North of the mouth of the Chensagi River (confluence with Maicasagi Lake);
- 41.7 kilometres (25.9 mi) Northeast of Goéland Lake (Waswanipi River);
- 68.2 kilometres (42.4 mi) North of the mouth of the Matagami Lake;
- 195 kilometres (121 mi) south-east of the mouth of the Nottaway River);
- 92.2 kilometres (57.3 mi) North of downtown Matagami

From the mouth of the head lake, the "Chensagi River West" flows over 48.4 kilometres (30.1 mi) according to the following segments:

- 6.9 kilometres (4.3 mi) Northeasterly winding and crossing over a 1.8 kilometres (1.1 mi) a lake (altitude: 282 metres (925 ft)) North to its mouth;
- 5.4 kilometres (3.4 mi) Northeast crossing on a lake 2.3 kilometres (1.4 mi) a lake (altitude: 281 metres (922 ft)) to its East mouth;
- 9.0 kilometres (5.6 mi) South, to a creek (coming from the East);
- 9.6 kilometres (6.0 mi) Southwesterly to a creek (coming from the East);
- 13.8 kilometres (8.6 mi) South through five lakes formed by the widening of the river, to the northern limit of the township of Dambourges;
- 3.7 kilometres (2.3 mi) South in the Township of Dambourges to its mouth.

The "West Chensagi River" flows on the north bank of the Chensagi River which generally flows southwestward across Chensagi Lake to a bay in the northwest of Lake Maicasagi. The latter in turn flows Southwesterly through the Max Passage into the Goéland Lake which is crossed to the Northwest by the Waswanipi River.

The mouth of the West Chensagi River located at:

- 13.4 kilometres (8.3 mi) Southeast of Poncheville Lake;
- 12.1 kilometres (7.5 mi) Northeast of the mouth of Chensagi Lake;
- 15.1 kilometres (9.4 mi) North of the mouth of the Chensagi River;
- 25.6 kilometres (15.9 mi) Northeast of the mouth of Maicasagi Lake.
- 39.6 kilometres (24.6 mi) Northeast of the mouth of Goéland Lake (Waswanipi River);
- 51.9 kilometres (32.2 mi) Northeast of the mouth of Olga Lake (Waswanipi River);
- 70.1 kilometres (43.6 mi) Northwest of the village center of Waswanipi;
- 84.4 kilometres (52.4 mi) Northeast of downtown Matagami.

== Toponymy ==
The toponym "rivière Chensagi" was formalized on December 5, 1968, at the Commission de toponymie du Québec, that is to say the creation of this commission

== See also ==
- James Bay
- Rupert Bay
- Nottaway River, a watercourse
- Matagami Lake, a body of water
- Waswanipi River, a watercourse
- Goéland Lake (Waswanipi River), a body of water
- Maicasagi Lake, a body of water
- Chensagi River, a watercourse
- List of rivers of Quebec
