= Chensagi River East =

Chensagi East
- Watershed of Nottaway River

Location
- Country: Canada
- Province: Quebec
- Region: Eeyou Istchee Baie-James (municipality)

Physical characteristics
- Source: Little unidentified lake in mountain
  - location: Eeyou Istchee Baie-James (municipality), Nord-du-Québec, Quebec
  - coordinates: 50°09′17″N 76°09′53″W
  - elevation: 328 m (1,076 ft)
- Mouth: Chensagi River
  - location: Eeyou Istchee Baie-James (municipality), Nord-du-Québec, Quebec
  - coordinates: 50°09′58″N 76°33′05″W
  - elevation: 267 m (876 ft)
- Length: 53.4 km (33.2 mi)

The Chensagi River East is a tributary of the Chensagi River in Regional County Municipality (RCM) of Eeyou Istchee Baie-James (municipality), in the administrative region of Nord-du-Québec, in the Canadian province of Quebec, in Canada.

The East Chensagi River hydrographic slope is served by the secondary northbound road from Matagami passing at 4.5 kilometres (2.8 mi) West of the mouth of the East Chensagi River. Another forest road from the South spans the Maicasagi River, then cross the East Chensagi River. The surface of the river is usually frozen from early November to mid-May, however, safe ice circulation is generally from mid-November to mid-April.

== Geography ==
The main hydrographic slopes near the Chensagi River East are:

- North side: Chensagi River, Amisquioumisca Lake, Nipukatasi River, Rocher lake;
- East side: Maicasagi River, Moquachéa Lake;
- South side: Yapuouichi Lake, Maicasagi River;
- West side: Chensagi River, Chensagi Lake, Poncheville Lake.

The Chensagi River originates at the mouth of a small unidentified lake (altitude: 328 metres (1,076 ft)). This lake is situated between two mountains whose peaks reach 402 metres (1,319 ft) (in the South-West) and 429 metres (1,407 ft) (in the Northeast).

The mouth of this head lake is located at:

- 27.9 kilometres (17.3 mi) North of the mouth of the East Chensagi River
- 42.8 kilometres (26.6 mi) Northeast of the mouth of the Chensagi River (confluence with Maicasagi Lake);
- 64.2 kilometres (39.9 mi) Northeast of Goéland Lake (Waswanipi River);
- 97.5 kilometres (60.6 mi) North of the mouth of the Matagami Lake;
- 233 kilometres (145 mi) Southeast of the mouth of the Nottaway River);
- 114.4 kilometres (71.1 mi) Northeast of downtown Matagami.

From its source, the "Chensagi River East" flows over 53.4 kilometres (33.2 mi) according to the following segments:

- 17.9 kilometres (11.1 mi) to the North to round a mountain, then to the southwest, forming a curve to the Northwest, departing as far as 14 kilometres (8.7 mi) from the course of this segment, to a stream (coming from the East);
- 6.8 kilometres (4.2 mi) West, to a creek (coming from the South);
- 8.9 kilometres (5.5 mi) North to a stream (coming from the East);
- 8.9 kilometres (5.5 mi) North to a creek (coming from the East);
- 6.1 kilometres (3.8 mi) North, then West, through marsh areas, to a stream (from the Northeast);
- 13.7 kilometres (8.5 mi) West through marsh areas to its mouth.

The "Chensagi River East" empties on the East bank of the Chensagi River which generally flows Southwestward across Chensagi Lake to a bay in the northwest of Maicasagi Lake. The latter in turn flows southwesterly through the Max Passage into the Goéland Lake, which is crossed to the northwest by the Waswanipi River.

The mouth of the Chensagi River East is located at:

- 19.9 kilometres (12.4 mi) North of the mouth of the Chensagi River;
- 30.5 kilometres (19.0 mi) Northeast of the mouth of Maicasagi Lake;
- 44.4 kilometres (27.6 mi) Northeast of the mouth of Goéland Lake (Waswanipi River);
- 57.2 kilometres (35.5 mi) Northeast of the mouth of Olga Lake (Waswanipi River);
- 68.8 kilometres (42.8 mi) Northwest of the village center of Waswanipi;
- 89.5 kilometres (55.6 mi) Northeast of downtown Matagami.

== Toponymy ==
The toponym "rivière Chensagi" was formalized on December 5, 1968, at the Commission de toponymie du Québec, i.e. at the creation of this commission

== See also ==
- James Bay
- Rupert Bay
- Nottaway River, a watercourse
- Matagami Lake, a body of water
- Waswanipi River, a watercourse
- Goéland Lake (Waswanipi River), a body of water
- Chensagi Lake, a body of water
- Maicasagi Lake, a body of water
- Chensagi River, a watercourse
- List of rivers of Quebec
