= La Trêve Lake =

Tributary of La Trêve river, Quebec, Canada

- Watershed of Nottaway River

- Location within Quebec
- Location: Baie-James
- Coordinates: 49°55′49″N 75°32′19″W
- Type: Natural
- Primary inflows: Mildred River, Dempster creek, Daladier creek.
- Primary outflows: La Trêve River
- Basin countries: Canada
- Max. length: 32 kilometres (20 mi)
- Max. width: 10 kilometres (6.2 mi)
- Surface area: 61 kilometres (38 mi)
- Surface elevation: 337 metres (1,106 ft)

La Trêve Lake is a freshwater body of the southern part of Eeyou Istchee James Bay (municipality), in the administrative region of Nord-du-Québec, in the province of Quebec, in Canada.

The surface of the lake is largely in the cantons of Daine and Guettard; in addition, Rita Bay (in the South) extends into the canton of La Ribourde. Forestry is the main economic activity of the sector. Recreational tourism activities come second.

The hydrographic slope of La Trêve Lake is accessible via a forest road from the South and serving the western part of the lake; this road links to road 113 linking Lebel-sur-Quévillon to Chibougamau. The surface of "Lac la Trêve" is usually frozen from early November to mid-May, however, safe ice circulation is generally from mid-November to mid-April.

== Geography ==
This lake has a length of 32.0 kilometres (19.9 mi), a maximum width of 10 kilometres (6.2 mi) and an altitude of 337 metres (1,106 ft). Of very deformed nature, this lake includes:

- East side: Dussault Bay and Pichamobi Bay (which receives the waters of Dempster Creek, coming from the East);
- Northwest side: Gilbert Bay, where the outlet of the lake is located, which empties into the bottom of a bay in the La Trêve River;
- West side: Baie Geneviève;
- South side: Rita Bay.

Note: The Geneviève and Rita bays are separated by a peninsula stretching Northeast on 8.6 kilometres (5.3 mi). The Gilbert and Geneviève bays are separated by a peninsula stretching Northeast on 7.5 kilometres (4.7 mi) which encases Lake Gisèle. On the East side, Pichamobi Bay and Dussault Bay are separated by a peninsula that extends westward on 4.4 kilometres (2.7 mi).

The mouth of La Trêve Lake is located at the end of a bay on the North-West side, at:

- 20.0 kilometres (12.4 mi) east of the mouth of the La Trêve River (confluence with the Maicasagi River);
- 66.2 kilometres (41.1 mi) North of the mouth of the Maicasagi River (confluence with Maicasagi Lake);
- 92.8 kilometres (57.7 mi) North-East of the mouth of Goéland Lake (Waswanipi River);
- 112.4 kilometres (69.8 mi) Northeast of the mouth of Olga Lake (Waswanipi River);
- 34.8 kilometres (21.6 mi) Northeast of the village center of Waswanipi;
- 144.9 kilometres (90.0 mi) Northeast of downtown Matagami;
- 134.6 kilometres (83.6 mi) Northeast of the mouth of Matagami Lake.

The main hydrographic slopes near La Trêve Lake are:

- North side: Mildred River, Caupichigau River, Caupichigau Lake;
- East side: Dempster Creek, Brock River, Chibougamau River;
- South side: Chibougamau River, Alouettes Creek;
- West side: Inconnue Lake, La Trêve River.

This hydronym is indicated on a topographic map dated 1928. Its meaning remains unknown.

The toponym "Lac La Trêve" was formalized on December 5, 1968, by the Commission de toponymie du Québec when it was created.

== See also ==
- James Bay
- Rupert Bay
- Nottaway River, a watercourse
- Matagami Lake, a body of water
- Waswanipi River, a watercourse
- Maicasagi Lake, a watercourse
- La Trêve River, a watercourse
- Eeyou Istchee Baie-James (municipality), a municipality
- List of lakes in Canada
