= Chensagi =

Chensagi may refer to:

== Toponyms ==
=== Canada ===
- Chensagi River, a tributary of Maicasagi Lake, in Quebec
  - Chensagi River East, a tributary of Chensagi River
  - Chensagi River West, a tributary of Chensagi River
- Chensagi Lake, a lake crossed by Chensagi River
