= Rocher Lake (Nipukatasi River) =

Lake in Nord-du-Québec, Quebec, Canada

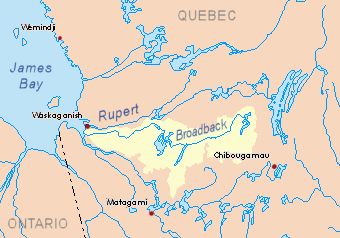
- Watershed of Broadback River

- Location within Quebec
- Location: Eeyou Istchee Baie-James (municipality) (RCM)
- Coordinates: 50°34′16″N 76°25′38″W
- Type: Natural
- Primary inflows: Nipukatasi River and few forested creek
- Primary outflows: Nipukatasi River
- Basin countries: Canada
- Max. length: 27.1 kilometres (16.8 mi)
- Max. width: 2.7 kilometres (1.7 mi)
- Surface area: 45.79 kilometres (28.45 mi)
- Surface elevation: 255 metres (837 ft)

The Rocher Lake is a freshwater body of the Broadback River watershed, of the municipality of Eeyou Istchee James Bay (municipality), in the Nord-du-Québec, in Quebec, in Canada.

Forestry is the main economic activity of the sector. Recreational tourism activities come second with a large downstream navigable body of water, especially the lower Nipukatasi River and the Broadback River.

The hydrographic slope of lake Rocher is accessible via the forest road R1023 (east-west) from the west, passing north of “Île au Pain de Sucre”, then heading north-east to pass from the West of lake Rocher; the R1023 connects the "James Bay Road" (North-South direction) that comes from Matagami. Another road (North-South direction) passes on the east side of Lake Rocher and on the west side of Amisquioumisca Lake.

The surface of Lake Rocher is usually frozen from early November to mid-May, however, safe ice circulation is generally from mid-November to mid-April.

== Geography ==
Lake Rocher receives from the South side the waters of the Nipukatasi River whose main lake is the Amisquioumisca Lake. Lake Rocher is part of a group of lakes in the same area, generally formed in length, more or less parallel to each other, including Ouescapis Lake, Quénonisca Lake, Salamandre Lake (Broadback River), Opataouaga Lake and Amisquioumisca Lake. While on the west side, the major body of water is Evans Lake.

Lake Rocher has a length of 27.1 kilometres (16.8 mi), a width of 2.7 kilometres (1.7 mi), an altitude of 255 kilometres (158 mi) and an area of 45.79 square kilometres (17.68 sq mi). Made long by the widening of the Nipukatasi River, this lake has 17 islands and a few bays.

The surrounding areas near the lake have a generally leveled topography, except Mount Dome whose summit culminates at 381 metres (1,250 ft) at 3.6 kilometres (2.2 mi) north-west of the lake. This summit is equidistant from Quénonisca Lake, which is a neighboring body of water to the northwest.

The mouth of Lake Rocher is located at:

- 24.2 kilometres (15.0 mi) south of Théodat Lake;
- 10.7 kilometres (6.6 mi) Southwest of the mouth of the Nipukatasi River (confluence with the Broadback River);
- 55.8 kilometres (34.7 mi) south-east of the mouth of Evans Lake which is crossed by the Broadback River;
- 194 kilometres (121 mi) south-east of the mouth of the Broadback River (confluence with Rupert Bay);
- 136.7 kilometres (84.9 mi) north-east of downtown Matagami;
- 161.3 kilometres (100.2 mi) north-west of downtown Chibougamau.
The lake Rocher Lake empties on the northeast side by the Nipukatasi River whose course flows over 4.1 kilometres (2.5 mi) north-east into a marsh zone to a lake unidentified (length: 6.4 kilometres (4.0 mi); altitude: 253 metres (830 ft)) that the current flows through to its full length. Then, the current continues northward on the 2.9 kilometres (1.8 mi) in the marsh zone, until the confluence of the Nipukatasi River which flows on the South shore of the Broadback River. From there, the current flows westward along the Broadback River over 15.3 kilometres (9.5 mi) to the east shore of Corbeau Bay, which is an extension of the Evans Lake. Downstream of Evans Lake, the current flows westward to the eastern shore of Rupert Bay.

== Toponymy ==
This hydronym evokes the work of life of Robert Rocher, former member of the Geographical Survey of Quebec, in 1917.

The toponym Lac Rocher was formalized on December 5, 1968 at the Commission de toponymie du Québec, at the creation of this commission.

== See also ==
- Rupert Bay
- Broadback River, a watercourse
- Evans Lake, a body of water
- Nipukatasi River, a watercourse
- Eeyou Istchee James Bay (municipality)
- List of lakes in Canada
