= Iserhoff River North =

Iserhoff North
- Watershed of Nottaway River

Location
- Country: Canada
- Province: Quebec
- Region: Eeyou Istchee Baie-James (municipality)

Physical characteristics
- Source: Little creek in forested
  - location: Eeyou Istchee Baie-James (municipality), Nord-du-Québec, Quebec
  - coordinates: 49°36′34″N 76°42′02″W
  - elevation: 317 m (1,040 ft)
- Mouth: Iserhoff River
  - location: Eeyou Istchee Baie-James (municipality), Nord-du-Québec, Quebec
  - coordinates: 49°29′43″N 76°39′36″W
  - elevation: 268 m (879 ft)

The Iserhoff River North is a tributary of the Iserhoff River, flowing into Regional County Municipality (RCM) of Eeyou Istchee Baie-James (municipality), in the administrative region of Nord-du-Québec, in the province Canadian of Quebec, in Canada.

The course of the river Iserhoff Nord successively crosses the townships of Vignal and Bergères.

The hydrographic slope of the Iserhoff River North is accessible by the R1018 road (North-South direction). This road is attached to the South to the road 113 linking Lebel-sur-Quévillon to Chibougamau.

The surface of the Iserhoff North River is usually frozen from early November to mid-May, however, safe ice circulation is usually from mid-November to mid-April.

== Geography ==
The main hydrographic slopes near the North Iserhoff River are:

- North side: Vignal Creek, Waswanipi River, Goéland Lake (Waswanipi River);
- East side: Lake Waswanipi, Bachelor River;
- South side: Iserhoff River, Madeleine Lake;
- West side: Opaoca River, Bell River.

The Iserhoff North River originates from a forest stream near Highway 1018 (North-South direction) at the foot of the Waswanipi Hills at:

- 11.5 kilometres (7.1 mi) North of the mouth of the North Iserhoff River (confluence with the Iserhoff River);
- 12.1 kilometres (7.5 mi) Northwest of the mouth of the Iserhoff River (confluence with Lake Waswanipi;
- 18.0 kilometres (11.2 mi) Southwest of the mouth of Lake Waswanipi (confluence with the Maicasagi River);
- 31.1 kilometres (19.3 mi) Southeast of the mouth of Goéland Lake (Waswanipi River);

South of the mouth of the Matagami Lake;

- 244.8 kilometres (152.1 mi) Southeast of the mouth of the Nottaway River;
- 69.2 kilometres (43.0 mi) Southeast of downtown Matagami.

From its source, the "Iserhoff River North" flows over 20.6 kilometres (12.8 mi) according to the following segments:

- 3.0 kilometres (1.9 mi) southerly in Vignal Township through a marsh zone to the northern limit of the township of Bergères;
- 1.5 kilometres (0.93 mi) southerly in the canton of Bergères, to a creek coming from a mountain range (coming from the North-West);
- 3.7 kilometres (2.3 mi) southeasterly at the foot of Waswanipi Hills to the bridge of a forest road that passes on the west side of the R1018 forest road;
- 4.0 kilometres (2.5 mi) southerly forming an easterly curve to drain a marsh area to R1018 Forest Road Bridge;
- 6.0 kilometres (3.7 mi) west, to a creek (coming from the North);
- 2.4 kilometres (1.5 mi) south winding to its mouth.

The Iserhoff North River empties onto the North shore of the Iserhoff River, which flows eastward to the bottom of the Southwest Bay of Lake Waswanipi. From this mouth, the current flows East, then North, on the Lake Waswanipi to its mouth. From there, the current flows first north through the Waswanipi River, then West to the East shore of Goéland Lake (Waswanipi River). The current flows westward to the east shore of Goéland Lake (Waswanipi River). The latter is crossed to the northwest by the Waswanipi River which is a tributary of Matagami Lake.

The mouth of the Iserhoff North River is located at:

- 6.0 kilometres (3.7 mi) West of the mouth of the Iserhoff River;
- 27.3 kilometres (17.0 mi) southwesterly of the mouth of Lake Waswanipi (confluence with the Waswanipi River);
- 17.9 kilometres (11.1 mi) Southeast of a bay south of Goéland Lake (Waswanipi River);
- 40.4 kilometres (25.1 mi) Southeast of the mouth of Goéland Lake (Waswanipi River);
- 51.5 kilometres (32.0 mi) Southeast of the mouth of Olga Lake (Waswanipi River);
- 65.1 kilometres (40.5 mi) South-west of the village center of Waswanipi;
- 70.3 kilometres (43.7 mi) Southeast of downtown Matagami.

== Toponymy ==
The term "Iserhoff" is a family name.

The toponym "Iserhoff North River" was formalized on December 5, 1968, at the Commission de toponymie du Québec, at the creation of this commission

== See also ==
- James Bay
- Rupert Bay
- Nottaway River, a watercourse
- Matagami Lake, a body of water
- Waswanipi River, a watercourse
- Goéland Lake (Waswanipi River), a body of water
- Lake Waswanipi, a body of water
- Iserhoff River, a watercourse
- List of rivers of Quebec
