= Ouescapis Lake =

Lake in Quebec, Canada

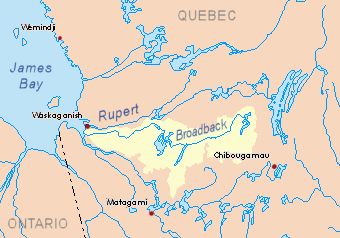
- Watershed of Broadback River

- Location within Quebec
- Location: Eeyou Istchee Baie-James (municipality) (RCM)
- Coordinates: 50°14′51″N 76°59′52″W
- Type: Natural
- Primary inflows: Some forested creeks
- Primary outflows: Outlet of lake Ouescapis
- Basin countries: Canada
- Max. length: 21.1 kilometres (13.1 mi)
- Max. width: 3.3 kilometres (2.1 mi)
- Surface area: 4.72 kilometres (2.93 mi)
- Surface elevation: 279 metres (915 ft)

Lake Ouescapis is a freshwater body of the Broadback River watershed in the Municipality of Eeyou Istchee Baie-James (municipality), in the Administrative Region of Nord-du-Québec, in Quebec, in Canada.

Forestry is the main economic activity of the sector. Recreational tourism activities come second.

The hydrographic slope of Lake Ouescapis is accessible via the James Bay road (North-South direction) from Matagami, passing from the West of the lake.

The surface of lake Ouescapis is usually frozen from early November to mid-May, however, safe ice circulation is generally from mid-November to mid-April.

== Geography ==
The Lake Ouescapis is fed by numerous riparian streams. The Lake Ouescapis is part of a group of lakes in the same area (between the Broadback River and the Waswanipi River), generally formed in length, more or less parallel to one another, in particular Quénonisca Lake, Salamandre Lake (Broadback River), Opataouaga Lake, Amisquioumisca Lake and Rocher Lake (Nipukatasi River). While on the northwest side, the major body of water is Evans Lake.

The Lake Ouescapis has a length of 21.1 kilometres (13.1 mi), a width of 3.3 kilometres (2.1 mi), an altitude of 279 kilometres (173 mi) and an area of 4.72 square kilometres (1.82 sq mi). In length, this lake has 14 islands and some bays.

Surrounding areas near the lake include mountain peaks, the highest on the east side reaching 358 metres (1,175 ft) and another at 358 metres (1,175 ft) on the west side of the lake. Neighboring bodies of water are: Lake Poncheville (at 3.6 kilometres (2.2 mi) on the east side, Opataouaga Lake at 11.1 kilometres (6.9 mi) on the north side. East, Quénonisca Lake to 11.0 kilometres (6.8 mi) on the Northeast side, Matagami Lake to 15.9 kilometres (9.9 mi) on the Southwest side.

The mouth of lake Ouescapis is located at:

- 6.5 kilometres (4.0 mi) west of the mouth of the outlet of lake Ouescapis;
- 18.9 kilometres (11.7 mi) South of the mouth of Opataouaga Lake;
- 61.0 kilometres (37.9 mi) south-west of the mouth of Quénonisca Lake (confluence with Broadback River);
- 78.8 kilometres (49.0 mi) South of the mouth of Evans Lake which is crossed by the Broadback River;
- 177.6 kilometres (110.4 mi) south-east of the mouth of the Broadback River (confluence with Rupert Bay);
- 80.6 kilometres (50.1 mi) north-east of downtown Matagami;
- 186 kilometres (116 mi) west of downtown Chibougamau.

The Lake Ouescapis flows on the northeast side by a discharge flowing over 10.6 kilometres (6.6 mi) the South-East by forming small serpentines to the north shore of Lake Poncheville (length: 37.1 kilometres (23.1 mi); altitude: 269 metres (883 ft)). From there, the current crosses on 46.7 kilometres (29.0 mi) up to the Broadback River, according to following segments:

- 1.9 kilometres (1.2 mi) to East crossing the Northern part of Lake Poncheville;
- 7.5 kilometres (4.7 mi) to the North-East via the "Détroit de Sable" (English: Sand Strait);
- 12.2 kilometres (7.6 mi) crossing Northward the Opataouaga Lake bypassing to the East the "Île du Pain de Sucre" (English: Island of Sugarloaf);
- 14.8 kilometres (9.2 mi) Northward through the outlet of 5.9 kilometres (3.7 mi) and a bay of Quénonisca Lake on 8.9 kilometres (5.5 mi);
- 10.3 kilometres (6.4 mi) North-East, until it confluences with the Broadback River.
From there, the current flows westward along the Broadback River over 15.3 kilometres (9.5 mi) to the east shore of Corbeau Bay, which is an extension of the Evans Lake. Downstream of Evans Lake, the current flows through the Broadback River westward to the eastern shore of Rupert Bay.

== Toponymy ==
The toponym lake Ouescapis was formalized on December 5, 1968 at the Commission de toponymie du Québec, at the creation of this commission.

== See also ==
- Rupert Bay
- Broadback River, a watercourse
- Evans Lake, a body of water
- Quénonisca Lake, a watercourse
- Lake Poncheville, a watercourse
- Eeyou Istchee James Bay (Municipality)
- List of lakes in Canada
