= Capichigamau Lake =

Lake in Quebec, Canada

- Watershed of Nottaway River

- Location within Quebec
- Location: Eeyou Istchee James Bay Regional Government
- Coordinates: 50°22′18″N 75°34′22″W
- Type: Natural
- Primary inflows: Mountains creek and outlet of lakes
- Primary outflows: Outlet of lake Capichigamau
- Basin countries: Canada
- Max. length: 21.1 kilometres (13.1 mi)
- Max. width: 2.0 kilometres (1.2 mi)
- Surface elevation: 356 metres (1,168 ft)

Lake Capichigamau is a freshwater body of the southern part of the Eeyou Istchee James Bay (municipality), in the region of Nord-du-Québec, in the province of Quebec, Canada. This lake is part of the Assinica Wildlife Sanctuary. This lake is part of the canton of Bellerive.

Forestry is the main economic activity of the sector. Recreational tourism activities come second.

The hydrographic slope of lake Capichigamau is accessible by a forest road (North–south direction) passing to the west of La Trève Lake and joining towards the South route 113 (linking Lebel-sur-Quévillon to Chibougamau).

The surface of Capichigamau Lake is usually frozen from early November to mid-May, however, safe ice circulation is generally from mid-November to mid-April.

== Geography ==
This lake has a length of 21.1 kilometres (13.1 mi), a maximum width of 2.0 kilometres (1.2 mi) and an altitude of 356 metres (1,168 ft). The southwestern portion of the lake is particularly embedded in mountains with a peak reaching the west side. The northern part of the lake is surrounded by some marsh areas.

Lake Capichigamau obtains supplies from the south on two small mountain lakes, on the east side by the discharge of two unidentified lakes, on the west side by the discharge of two unidentified lakes and on the north side by the dump an unidentified lake.

The Lake Capichigamau outlet is located in the north and flows northward across the marsh zone to the mouth of Boissy Lake (elevation: 319 metres (1,047 ft)), which is crossed to the southwest by the Assinica River. The mouth of Lake Capichigamau is located at the bottom from a bay to:

- 12.4 kilometres (7.7 mi) at South of the mouth of the outlet of lake Capichigamau confluence with the Assinica River);
- 31.3 kilometres (19.4 mi) south-east of the mouth of the Assinica River (confluence with the Broadback River);
- 138.9 kilometres (86.3 mi) southeast of the mouth of Evans Lake;
- 279 kilometres (173 mi) east of the mouth of the Broadback River (confluence with Rupert Bay);
- 77.5 kilometres (48.2 mi) north-west of downtown Chibougamau;
- 187 kilometres (116 mi) north-east of downtown Matagami.

The main hydrographic slopes adjacent to Surprise Lake are:

- North side: La Chevardière Lake, Assinica River, Broadback River;
- East side: Waposite Lake, Comencho Lake, Opataca Lake;
- South side: Omo Lake, Caupichigau Lake, La Trève Lake, Chibougamau River;
- West side: Moquachéa Lake, Amisquioumisca Lake, Luky Strike Creek, Nipukatasi River.

== Toponymy ==
Of Cree origin, the term "Capichigamau" means "long lake". This name appears for the first time in 1951 on a map of the province of Quebec.

The toponym "Lac Capichigamau" was formalized on December 5, 1968, by the Commission de toponymie du Québec when it was created.

== See also ==
- James Bay
- Rupert Bay
- Broadback River, a watercourse
- Evans Lake, a body of water
- Assinica River, a body of water
- Eeyou Istchee Baie-James (municipality), a municipality
- List of lakes in Canada
