= Amisquioumisca Lake =

Lake in Nord-du-Québec, Quebec, Canada

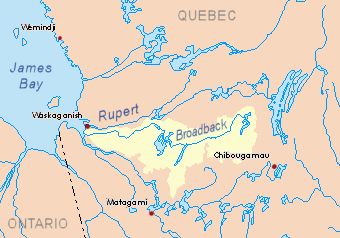
- Watershed of Broadback River

- Location within Quebec
- Location: Eeyou Istchee Baie-James (municipality) (RCM)
- Coordinates: 50°27′27″N 76°12′54″W
- Type: Natural
- Primary inflows: Some forested creeks
- Primary outflows: Nipukatasi River
- Basin countries: Canada
- Max. length: 14.0 kilometres (8.7 mi)
- Max. width: 4.7 kilometres (2.9 mi)
- Surface area: 31.61 kilometres (19.64 mi)
- Surface elevation: 302 metres (991 ft)

Amisquioumisca Lake is a freshwater body consisting of a major body of water in the Nipukatasi River, on the South Hydrographic Slope of the Broadback River, in the Municipality of Eeyou Istchee Baie-James (municipality), in the administrative region of Nord-du-Québec, in Quebec, in Canada.

The forestry is the main economic activity of the sector. Recreational tourism activities come second.

The hydrographic slope of Amisquioumisca Lake is accessible via the James Bay Highway (North-South direction) from Matagami, passing on the west side of the lake.

The surface of Amisquioumisca Lake is usually frozen from early November to mid-May, however, safe ice circulation is generally from mid-November to mid-April.

== Geography ==
The Amisquioumisca Lake is part of a group of lakes in the same area (between the Broadback River and the Waswanipi River, generally formed in length, more or less parallel to one another, including Ouescapis Lake, Lake Poncheville, Quénonisca Lake, Salamandre Lake (Broadback River), Opataouaga Lake, and Rocher Lake (Nipukatasi River).

While on the northwest side, the major body of water is Evans Lake.

The Amisquioumisca Lake is fed by several riparian creeks and especially the Nipukatasi River (coming from the North). The current of this river crosses the lake on the south-west.

The Amisquioumisca Lake has a length of 14.0 kilometres (8.7 mi), a width of 4.7 kilometres (2.9 mi), an altitude of 302 kilometres (188 mi) and an area of . Made in length, this lake has 13 islands.

Surrounding areas near the lake include several mountain peaks.

The mouth of the lake is located at:

- 3.4 kilometres (2.1 mi) south-east of the southern part of Rocher Lake (Nipukatasi River);
- 26.0 kilometres (16.2 mi) South of the mouth of Rocher Lake (Nipukatasi River);
- 36.0 kilometres (22.4 mi) south of the mouth of the Nipukatasi River (confluence with the Broadback River);
- 74.1 kilometres (46.0 mi) south-east of the mouth of Evans Lake which is crossed by the Broadback River;
- 197.7 kilometres (122.8 mi) southeast of the mouth of the Broadback River (confluence with Rupert Bay);
- 114.3 kilometres (71.0 mi) north-east of downtown Matagami;
- 157.4 kilometres (97.8 mi) west of downtown Chibougamau.
The Amisquioumisca lake flows to the southwestern side. Its mouth is the beginning of the lower part of the Nipukatasi River. From there, the current flows over 77.5 kilometres (48.2 mi) crossing in particular Rocher Lake (Nipukatasi River), until its confluence with the Broadback River. From there, the current flows westward along the Broadback River over 15.3 kilometres (9.5 mi) to the east shore of Corbeau Bay, which is an extension of the Evans Lake. Downstream of Evans Lake, the current flows through the Broadback River westward to the eastern shore of Rupert Bay.

== Toponymy ==
In the past, the word "Amiskwumiska lake" was used to designate this body of water.

The toponym lac Amisquioumisca was formalized on December 5, 1968 at the Commission de toponymie du Québec, at the creation of this commission.

== See also ==
- Rupert Bay
- Broadback River, a watercourse
- Evans Lake, a body of water
- Nipukatasi River, a watercourse
- Rocher Lake (Nipukatasi River), a body of water
- Eeyou Istchee James Bay (municipality)
- List of lakes in Canada
