= Chensagi Lake =

Lake in Quebec, Canada

- Watershed of Nottaway River

- Location within Quebec
- Location: Eeyou Istchee Baie-James (municipality)
- Coordinates: 50°06′24″N 76°44′58″W
- Type: Natural
- Primary inflows: Chensagi River
- Primary outflows: Chensagi River
- Basin countries: Canada
- Max. length: 13.6 kilometres (8.5 mi)
- Max. width: 3.7 kilometres (2.3 mi)
- Surface elevation: 262 metres (860 ft)
- Settlements: Eeyou Istchee Baie-James (municipality)

Chensagi Lake is a freshwater body of the southern part of Baie-James, in the administrative region of Nord-du-Québec, in the province of Quebec, in Canada. The surface of the lake is partly in the township of Grandfontaine.

Forestry is the main economic activity of the sector. Recreational tourism activities come second, thanks to the connectivity of Chengasi Lake with a vast navigable body of water of length, including the Maicasagi Lake and the Goéland Lake (Waswanipi River). The latter lake is crossed to the northwest by the Waswanipi River.

The hydrographic slope of Chensagi Lake is accessible through a forest road from the west connecting the road from Matagami. The surface of Lake Chensagi is usually frozen from early November to mid-May, however, safe ice circulation is generally from mid-November to mid-April.

== Geography ==
This lake has a length of 13.6 kilometres (8.5 mi), a maximum width of 3.7 kilometres (2.3 mi) and an altitude of 262 metres (860 ft).

The Chensagi River (tributary of Maicasagi Lake) crosses Chensagi Lake to the Southwest in a longitudinal direction.

In addition to the Chensagi River, Chensagi Lake is supplied on the Southwest side by two streams, draining areas of marsh.

The mouth of this Chensagi Lake is directly connected to Maicasagi Lake by a short strait which forms the lower part of the Chensagi River. This mouth is located at the bottom of a bay on the East side, at:

- 8.6 kilometres (5.3 mi) Northwest of the mouth of the Chensagi River;
- 16.4 kilometres (10.2 mi) North of the mouth of Maicasagi Lake;
- 27.9 kilometres (17.3 mi) North of the mouth of Goéland Lake (Waswanipi River);
- 39.4 kilometres (24.5 mi) Northeast of the mouth of Olga Lake (Waswanipi River);
- 72.4 kilometres (45.0 mi) Northeast of downtown Matagami;
- 54.5 kilometres (33.9 mi) Northeast of the mouth of Matagami Lake.

The main hydrographic slopes adjacent to Chensagi Lake are:

- North side: Chensagi River West, Poncheville Lake, Opataouaga Lake;
- East side: Chensagi River, Chensagi River East;
- South side: Chensagi River, Maicasagi Lake, Goéland Lake (Waswanipi River);
- West side: Poncheville Lake, Waswanipi River, Soscumica Lake.

== Toponymy ==
The toponym "lac Chensagi" was formalized on December 5, 1968, by the Commission de toponymie du Québec when it was created.

== See also ==
- James Bay
- Rupert Bay
- Nottaway River, a watercourse
- Matagami Lake, a body of water
- Waswanipi River, a watercourse
- Maicasagi Lake, a watercourse
- Chensagi River, a watercourse
- Eeyou Istchee Baie-James (Municipality), a municipality
- List of lakes in Canada
