= Iserhoff =

Iserhoff may refer to:

- Iserhoff River, a tributary of Lake Waswanipi, in Eeyou Istchee Baie-James, Quebec, Canada
- Iserhoff River North, a tributary of the Iserhoff River
