= Opataouaga Lake =

Lake in Nord-du-Québec, Quebec, Canada

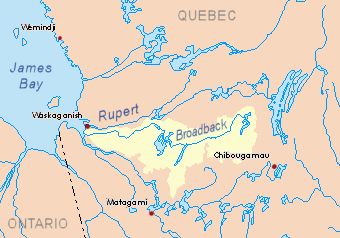
- Watershed of Broadback River

- Location within Quebec
- Location: Eeyou Istchee Baie-James (municipality) (RCM)
- Coordinates: 50°21′59″N 76°42′01″W
- Type: Natural
- Primary inflows: Lake Poncheville and few forested creek
- Primary outflows: Quénonisca Lake
- Basin countries: Canada
- Max. length: 13.0 kilometres (8.1 mi)
- Max. width: 5.3 kilometres (3.3 mi)
- Surface area: 27.54 kilometres (17.11 mi)
- Surface elevation: 269 metres (883 ft)

Opataouaga Lake is a freshwater body of the Broadback River hydrographic slope of the municipality of Eeyou Istchee James Bay (municipality), in the administrative region of Nord-du-Québec, in Quebec, in Canada.

Forestry is the main economic activity of the sector. Recreational tourism activities come second with a large navigable body of water upstream of Lake Poncheville, and downstream Quénonisca Lake and the Broadback River.

The hydrographic slope of lake Opataouaga is accessible through the forest road R1023 (East–west direction) coming from the West and passing north of “Île au Pain de Sucre” (English: Sugarloaf Island); the R1023 connects the "James Bay Road" (North–south direction) that comes from Matagami; from “Île au Pain de Sucre”, this road heads north-east to the west side of Lac Rocher.

The surface of Opataouaga Lake is usually frozen from early November to mid-May, however, safe ice circulation is generally from mid-November to mid-April.

== Geography ==
The Opataouaga Lake receives on the southwest side the waters of Lake Poncheville by the "Strait of Sables" (length: 7.5 kilometres (4.7 mi) width varying between 0.5 kilometres (0.31 mi) and 2.0 kilometres (1.2 mi)). Opataouaga Lake is part of a group of lakes in the same area, which are formed in length, more or less parallel to each other, including Ouescapis Lake, Quénonisca Lake, the Salamandre Lake, the Rocher Lake crossed by the Nipukatasi River and the Amisquioumisca Lake (east side). While on the west side, the major body of water is Evans Lake.

The Opataouaga Lake has a length of 13.0 kilometres (8.1 mi), a width of 5.3 kilometres (3.3 mi), an altitude of 269 kilometres (167 mi) and an area of 27.54 square kilometres (10.63 sq mi). This lake has 32 islands including four major islands. Located at the mouth of the lake, the largest island is Sugar Loaf Island; it has a length of 5.0 kilometres (3.1 mi) and width of 2.6 kilometres (1.6 mi).

The surrounding areas near the lake have a generally leveled topography, except for two mountains on the east side reaching 340 metres (1,120 ft) and 341 metres (1,119 ft) respectively. On the west side of the lake, two mountain tops reach respectively 347 metres (1,138 ft) and 351 metres (1,152 ft).

The mouth of Lake Opataouaga is located at:

- 14.4 kilometres (8.9 mi) south-west of a bay Rocher Lake;
- 43.8 kilometres (27.2 mi) southwest of the mouth of Quénonisca Lake (confluence with the Broadback River);
- 69.5 kilometres (43.2 mi) south-east of the mouth of Evans Lake which is crossed by the Broadback River;
- 184 kilometres (114 mi) south-east of the mouth of the Broadback River (confluence with Rupert Bay);
- 99.1 kilometres (61.6 mi) north-east of downtown Matagami;
- 174.5 kilometres (108.4 mi) west of downtown Chibougamau.
After crossing Sugarloaf Island, the Opataouaga Lake flows on the North side by a discharge flowing northward over a length of 5.9 kilometres (3.7 mi) which connects a bay (length of 8.9 kilometres (5.5 mi)) from the southeastern shore of Quénonisca Lake. Between the mouth of this bay and the mouth of Quénonisca Lake, the current travels a distance of 10.3 kilometres (6.4 mi) to the northeast. This lake flows on the south shore of the Broadback River. From there, the current flows westward along the Broadback River over 15.3 kilometres (9.5 mi) to the east shore of Corbeau Bay, which is an extension of the Evans Lake. Downstream of Evans Lake, the current flows westward to the eastern shore of Rupert Bay.

== Toponymy ==
Of Cree origin, this hydronym means "the lake with the sandy tip". This toponymic designation is indicated in the "Fifth Report of the Geographic Board of Canada 1904", published in Ottawa in 1905, page 46, under the graph: "Opatawaga; Lake, Northeast of Mattagami Lake, Abitibi District, Que. (Not Opiwatakan)".

The toponym Lake Opataouaga was formalized on December 5, 1968, at the Commission de toponymie du Québec, at the creation of this commission.

== See also ==
- Broadback River
- Evans Lake
- Quénonisca Lake
- Lake Poncheville
- Eeyou Istchee James Bay (municipality)
- List of lakes in Canada
