= Monsan =

Monsan may refer to:

- Monsan River, a tributary of Lake Monsan in Québec, Canada
- Lake Monsan, a stream crossed by the Maicasagi River, in Québec, Canada
