= Caupichigau =

Caupichigau may refer to:

- Caupichigau River, Canada
- Caupichigau Lake, Canada
