= Canet River =

Canet
- Watershed of Nottaway River

Location
- Country: Canada
- Province: Quebec
- Region: Eeyou Istchee Baie-James (municipality)

Physical characteristics
- Source: Marsh area
  - location: Eeyou Istchee Baie-James (municipality), Nord-du-Québec, Quebec
  - coordinates: 50°00′44″N 77°05′26″W
  - elevation: 274 m (899 ft)
- Mouth: Matagami Lake
  - location: Eeyou Istchee Baie-James (municipality), Nord-du-Québec, Quebec
  - coordinates: 49°54′47″N 77°13′26″W
  - elevation: 271 m (889 ft)
- Length: 30.7 km (19.1 mi)

The Canet River is a tributary of Matagami Lake, flowing into the territory of Eeyou Istchee Baie-James (municipality), in the administrative region of Nord-du-Québec, in Quebec, in Canada.

The Canet River flows in forest and marsh zone (especially in its upper part), East of Lake Matagami. This course has a very slight difference in level. Road transport to James Bay is the main economic activity of this watershed. The surface of the river is usually frozen from the beginning of December to the end of April.

Coming from Matagami, the James Bay road passes first between Olga Lake and the Canet River; then this road forks north to cut the Canet River in the middle. Then it goes straight back to the north, passing west of Poncheville Lake.

== Geography ==
The Canet River originates from a marsh area at an altitude of 274 metres (899 ft). This source of the river is located at 48.7 kilometres (30.3 mi) south-east of downtown of Matagami, at 29.8 kilometres (18.5 mi) north-east of the mouth of Matagami Lake and at 14.1 kilometres (8.8 mi) northeast of the confluence of the Canet River with the Matagami Lake.

This source of the river is located:

- north of the watershed with the hydrographic slope of Olga Lake which is crossed by the Waswanipi River;
- south of the watershed with the Poncheville Lake watershed that flows northward to the Broadback River.

The main hydrographic slopes near the Canet River are:

- North side: Poncheville Lake, Ouescapis Lake, Chensagi River;
- East side: Goéland Lake, Waswanipi River;
- South side: Olga Lake, Waswanipi River;
- West side: Matagami Lake, Nottaway River.

From its source, the Canet River flows over 30.7 kilometres (19.1 mi) generally to the southwest, according to the following segments:

- 4.3 kilometres (2.7 mi) south, then east, to a creek (coming from the east);
- 4.1 kilometres (2.5 mi) to the south, to a creek (coming from the southwest);
- 2.0 kilometres (1.2 mi) easterly to a creek (coming from the northeast);
- 1.7 kilometres (1.1 mi) southeasterly, snaking to a creek (coming from the east);
- 11.1 kilometres (6.9 mi) southwesterly to the point where the river widens;
- 7.5 kilometres (4.7 mi) westerly, with widening of the river), to the confluence of the river

The Canet River discharges at the bottom of a bay on the east shore of Matagami Lake (elevation: 271 metres (889 ft)) which is connected to the Bay of the confluence of the Waswanipi River whose course crosses Lake Olga and is located south of the Canet River. The Matagami Lake empties on the North-West side by the North Bay in the Nottaway River. The latter will flow on the south-eastern shore of James Bay.

This confluence of the Canet River with the Matagami Lake is located at 23.3 kilometres (14.5 mi) south-east of the mouth of Matagami Lake, at 181.5 kilometres (112.8 mi) south-east of the confluence of the Nottaway River with James Bay, at 21.6 kilometres (13.4 mi) west of Gull Lake, 33.8 kilometres (21.0 mi) north-east of downtown Matagami and 96.6 kilometres (60.0 mi) northwest of Lebel-sur-Quévillon.

== Toponymy ==
The toponym "Canet River" was formalized on December 5, 1968, at the Commission de toponymie du Quebec, i.e. at the creation of this commission

== See also ==
- James Bay
- Rupert Bay
- Broadback River, a watercourse
- Evans Lake, a body of water
- List of rivers of Quebec
