= Caupichigau River =

Caupichigau
- Watershed of Nottaway River

Location
- Country: Canada
- Province: Quebec
- Region: Eeyou Istchee Baie-James (municipality)

Physical characteristics
- Source: Caupichigau Lake
  - location: Eeyou Istchee Baie-James (municipality), Nord-du-Québec, Quebec
  - coordinates: 50°02′39″N 75°37′23″W
  - elevation: 335 m (1,099 ft)
- Mouth: La Trève River
  - location: Eeyou Istchee Baie-James (municipality), Quebec
  - coordinates: 49°58′48″N 75°44′07″W
  - elevation: 330 m (1,080 ft)
- Length: 12.8 km (8.0 mi)

The Caupichigau River is a tributary of the La Trève River, flowing into Regional County Municipality (RCM) of Eeyou Istchee James Bay (municipality), within the administrative region of Nord-du-Québec, Canadian province of Quebec, in Canada.

The course of the river Caupichigau crosses successively the cantons of Berey and Daine.

The hydrographic slope of the Caupichigau River is accessible on road 113 linking Lebel-sur-Quévillon to Chibougamau. This road goes to 16.4 kilometres (10.2 mi) south of the mouth of Caupichigau Lake and passes south of the Inconnue Lake and Caupichigau Lake.

The surface of the Caupichigau River is usually frozen from early November to mid-May, however, safe ice movement is generally from mid-November to mid-April.

== Geography ==
The main hydrographic slopes near the Caupichigau river are:

- North side: Caupichigau Lake, Omo Lake, Omo River;
- East side: Mildred River, La Trève Lake;
- South side: La Trève River, Inconnue Lake;
- West side: Maicasagi River, La Trève River.

The Caupichigau river originates at the mouth of a Caupichigau Lake (length: 15.4 kilometres (9.6 mi); altitude: 335 metres (1,099 ft)). The mouth of this head lake is located at:

- 24.7 kilometres (15.3 mi) South of the southern boundary of the Assinica Wildlife Sanctuary;
- 10.9 kilometres (6.8 mi) Northeast of the mouth of the Caupichigau River (confluence with the La Trève River);
- 20.5 kilometres (12.7 mi) Northeast of the mouth of the La Trève River (confluence with the Maicasagi River);
- 66.1 kilometres (41.1 mi) Northeast of the mouth of the Maicasagi River (confluence with Lake Maicasagi);
- 95.8 kilometres (59.5 mi) Northeast of the mouth of Goéland Lake (Waswanipi River);
- 135.7 kilometres (84.3 mi) Northeast of the mouth of Matagami Lake;
- 270.1 kilometres (167.8 mi) Southeast of the mouth of the Nottaway River;
- 147.6 kilometres (91.7 mi) Northeast of downtown Matagami.

From Caupichigau Lake, the Caupichigau river flows on 12.8 kilometres (8.0 mi) according to the following segments:

- 3.8 kilometres (2.4 mi) southwesterly in the township of Berey in an enlargement, to the Northern limit of the township of Daine;
- 9.0 kilometres (5.6 mi) southwesterly in Daine Township to mouth.

The "Caupichigau River" flows into a river bend on the Northeastern shore of the La Trève River. From there, it flows Northwest to the Southeast bank of the Maicasagi River. The current flows westward to the east shore of Maicasagi Lake.

Then the current flows Southwest through the Max Passage into the Goéland Lake. The latter is crossed to the northwest by the Waswanipi River which is a tributary of Matagami Lake.

The mouth of the Caupichigau River located at:

- 13.0 kilometres (8.1 mi) south-east of the mouth of the La Trève River (confluence with the Maicasagi River);
- 59.1 kilometres (36.7 mi) Northeast of the mouth of the Maicasagi River (confluence with Maicasagi Lake);
- 86.2 kilometres (53.6 mi) Northeast of the mouth of Goéland Lake (Waswanipi River);
- 105.5 kilometres (65.6 mi) Northeast of the mouth of Olga Lake (Waswanipi River);
- 32.1 kilometres (19.9 mi) North of the village center of Waswanipi;
- 138.3 kilometres (85.9 mi) North of downtown Matagami

== Toponymy ==
The toponym "Caupichigau River" was formalized on December 5, 1968, at the Commission de toponymie du Québec, which created this commission

== See also ==
- James Bay
- Rupert Bay
- Nottaway River, a watercourse
- Matagami Lake, a body of water
- Waswanipi River, a watercourse
- Goéland Lake (Waswanipi River), a body of water
- Maicasagi Lake, a body of water
- Maicasagi River, a watercourse
- La Trève River, a watercourse
- List of rivers of Quebec
