= La Trêve River =

River in Quebec, Canada

La Trêve
- Watershed of Nottaway River

Location
- Country: Canada
- Province: Quebec
- Region: Eeyou Istchee Baie-James (municipality)

Physical characteristics
- Source: La Trêve Lake
  - location: Eeyou Istchee Baie-James (municipality), Nord-du-Québec, Quebec
  - coordinates: 49°57′43″N 75°38′58″W
  - elevation: 337 m (1,106 ft)
- Mouth: Maicasagi River
  - location: Eeyou Istchee Baie-James (municipality), Quebec
  - coordinates: 50°01′28″N 75°54′08″W
  - elevation: 281 m (922 ft)
- Length: 32.0 km (19.9 mi)

The La Trêve River is a tributary of the Maicasagi River located at Eeyou Istchee Baie-James (Municipality), in the Nord-du-Québec, in the Canadian province of Quebec, in Canada.

The course of the river La Trêve successively crosses the townships of Daine and Branssat.

The hydrographic slope of the La Trêve River is accessible on road 113 linking Lebel-sur-Quévillon to Chibougamau. This road goes to 16.3 kilometres (10.1 mi) South of the mouth of La Trêve Lake and goes to the South of the Inconnu Lake and La Trêve Lake.

The surface of La Trêve River is usually frozen from early November to mid-May, however, safe ice circulation is generally from mid-November to mid-April.

== Geography ==
The main hydrographic slopes near La Trêve River are:

- North side: Caupichigau River, Maicasagi River, Monsan River, Capichigau Lake;
- East side: Comencho Lake, Opataca Lake, La Trêve Lake;
- South side: Inconnue River (Maicasagi River), Inconnue Lake, Chibougamau River;
- West side: Maicasagi River, Inconnue River (Maicasagi River).

The river La Trêve originates at the mouth of a [[La Trêve lake] (length: 34.1 kilometres (21.2 mi)) altitude: 337 metres (1,106 ft)). The mouth of this head lake is located at:

- 55.0 kilometres (34.2 mi) South of the southern boundary of Assinica Wildlife Sanctuary;
- 19.7 kilometres (12.2 mi) North of the mouth of the La Trêve River (confluence with the Maicasagi River);
- 71.9 kilometres (44.7 mi) East of the mouth of the Maicasagi River (confluence with Maicasagi Lake);
- 100.6 kilometres (62.5 mi) East of the mouth of Goéland Lake (Waswanipi River);
- 143.8 kilometres (89.4 mi) East of the mouth of Matagami Lake;
- 302 kilometres (188 mi) Southeast of the mouth of the Nottaway River;
- 156.3 kilometres (97.1 mi) Northeast of downtown Matagami.

From La Trêve Lake, the "La Trêve River" flows on 32.0 kilometres (19.9 mi) according to the following segments:

- 4.4 kilometres (2.7 mi) Southwesterly through four falls, to a stream (from the South);
- 6.4 kilometres (4.0 mi) Westerly forming two curves to the North and crossing swamp areas to Huguette Creek (from the Southwest);
- 2.9 kilometres (1.8 mi) Northerly forming a slight westerly curve to the Caupichigau River (coming from the North);
- 7.3 kilometres (4.5 mi) Northwesterly through a marsh area at the beginning of the segment to Branssat Creek (from the South);
- 6.5 kilometres (4.0 mi) Northwesterly, forming a northeasterly curve to Veto Creek (from the Southwest);
- 4.5 kilometres (2.8 mi) West to mouth.

The "La Trêve River" flows into a river bend on the Southeastern shore of the Maicasagi River. From there, it flows West to the East shore of Maicasagi Lake. Then the current flows southwesterly through the Max Passage into the Goéland Lake. The latter is crossed to the Northwest by the Waswanipi River which is a tributary of Matagami Lake.

The mouth of La Trêve River located at:

- 47.5 kilometres (29.5 mi) Northeast of the mouth of the Maicasagi River (confluence with Maicasagi Lake);
- 72.5 kilometres (45.0 mi) Northeast of the mouth of [Goéland Lake (Waswanipi River)]];
- 88.0 kilometres (54.7 mi) Northeast of the mouth of Olga Lake (Waswanipi River);
- 18.3 kilometres (11.4 mi) North of the village center of Waswanipi;
- 120.3 kilometres (74.8 mi) North of downtown Matagami.

== Toponymy ==
The toponym "Rivière la Trêve" (English: La Trêve River) was formalized on December 5, 1968, at the Commission de toponymie du Québec, i.e. at the creation of this commission.

== See also ==
- James Bay
- Rupert Bay
- Nottaway River, a watercourse
- Matagami Lake, a body of water
- Waswanipi River, a watercourse
- Goéland Lake (Waswanipi River), a body of water
- Maicasagi Lake, a body of water
- Maicasagi River, a watercourse
- List of rivers of Quebec
