= Opaoca River =

Opaoca
- Watershed of Nottaway River

Location
- Country: Canada
- Province: Quebec
- Region: Eeyou Istchee Baie-James (municipality)

Physical characteristics
- Source: Anorthosite Lake
  - location: Eeyou Istchee Baie-James (municipality), Nord-du-Québec, Quebec
  - coordinates: 49°40′53″N 77°09′58″W
  - elevation: 336 m (1,102 ft)
- Mouth: Olga Lake (Waswanipi River), Waswanipi River
  - location: Eeyou Istchee Baie-James (municipality), Nord-du-Québec, Quebec
  - coordinates: 49°40′53″N 77°09′58″W
  - elevation: 256 m (840 ft)
- Length: 66.6 km (41.4 mi)

The Opaoca River is a tributary of Olga Lake (Waswanipi River), in Regional County Municipality (RCM) of Eeyou Istchee James Bay (municipality), in the administrative region of Nord-du-Québec, Canadian province of Quebec, in Canada.

The course of the river successively crosses the townships of Bourbaux, Berthiaume, Noyelles, Le Tardif, Comporte and Pouchot.

The hydrographic slope of the Opaoca River is served by various forest roads including the R1026 road (North-South direction). The northern route from Matagami passing at 19.4 kilometres (12.1 mi) to the northwest of the mouth of the Opaoca River. The surface of the river is usually frozen from early November to mid-May, however, safe ice circulation is generally from mid-November to mid-April.

== Geography ==
The main hydrographic slopes near the Opaoca River are:

- North side: Olga Lake (Waswanipi River), Waswanipi River;
- East side: Goéland Lake, Lake Waswanipi, Waswanipi River, Baptiste River, Iserhoff River;
- South side: Baptiste River, Bell River;
- West side: Bell River.

The Opaoca River originates at the mouth of Lake Anorthosite (length: 1.6 kilometres (0.99 mi) altitude: 336 metres (1,102 ft)). This lake straddles the townships of Bourbaux, Berthiaume and Noyelles.

The mouth of this lake is located at:

- 12.8 kilometres (8.0 mi) southeast of the mouth of the Opaoca River (confluence with Olga Lake (Waswanipi River);
- 32.3 kilometres (20.1 mi) Southeast of the mouth of Olga Lake (Waswanipi River);
- 60.3 kilometres (37.5 mi) South of the mouth of the Matagami Lake;
- 97 kilometres (60 mi) Southeast of the mouth of Lake Soscumica;
- 233 kilometres (145 mi) Southeast of the mouth of the Nottaway River);
- 48.0 kilometres (29.8 mi) East of downtown Matagami.

From its source, the "Opaoca River" flows on 66.6 kilometres (41.4 mi) according to the following segments:

- 5.3 kilometres (3.3 mi) southwesterly, forming an easterly curve to the bridge of a forest road R1026 (North-South direction);
- 24.6 kilometres (15.3 mi) southwesterly, then northwesterly, winding to a river bend;
- 8.8 kilometres (5.5 mi) north to a creek (coming from the East);
- 6.9 kilometres (4.3 mi) northwesterly winding to a creek (coming from the West);
- 6.5 kilometres (4.0 mi) northeasterly to a stream (coming from the northwest);
- 11.2 kilometres (7.0 mi) eastward in a gradual widening of the river, to a creek (coming from the East);
- 3.3 kilometres (2.1 mi) northerly in a widening of the river to its mouth.

The "Opaoca River" empties in Elisabeth bay, an extension of Olga Lake (Waswanipi River). The latter flows is crossed at the North by the Waswanipi River.

The mouth of the Opaoca River is located at:

- 19.8 kilometres (12.3 mi) Southeast of the mouth of Olga Lake (Waswanipi River).
- 46.8 kilometres (29.1 mi) Southeast of the mouth of Matagami Lake;
- 18.8 kilometres (11.7 mi) Southwest of Goéland Lake;
- 220 kilometres (140 mi) Southeast of the mouth of the Nottaway River;
- 35.3 kilometres (21.9 mi) East of downtown Matagami.

== Toponymy ==
Presumably of Cree origin, the origin of this hydronym would be a deviation from the word "opawakaw", meaning that there is "a pass, a narrowing between sandbanks". The “Commission de géographie du Québec” (English: Geographical Survey of Quebec) had formalized this name in 1948. The graphism Opaoka appears on the map of the township of Pouchot designed by the Department of Lands and Forests in 1965.

The toponym "Opaoca River" was formalized on December 5, 1968, at the Commission de toponymie du Quebec, i.e. the creation of this commission

== See also ==
- James Bay
- Rupert Bay
- Nottaway River, a watercourse
- Olga Lake (Waswanipi River), a body of water
- List of rivers of Quebec
