= Iserhoff River =

Iserhoff
- Watershed of Nottaway River

Location
- Country: Canada
- Province: Quebec
- Region: Eeyou Istchee Baie-James (municipality)

Physical characteristics
- Source: Little unidentified lake in mountains
  - location: Eeyou Istchee Baie-James (municipality), Nord-du-Québec, Quebec
  - coordinates: 49°26′10″N 77°04′47″W
  - elevation: 369 m (1,211 ft)
- Mouth: Lake Waswanipi
  - location: Eeyou Istchee Baie-James (municipality), Nord-du-Québec, Quebec
  - coordinates: 49°29′43″N 76°39′36″W
  - elevation: 267 m (876 ft)
- Length: 92.0 km (57.2 mi)

Basin features
- Tributaries
  - left: (from the mouth) Iserhoff River North, Imbault creek.

The Iserhoff River is a tributary of Lake Waswanipi, flowing into Regional County Municipality (RCM) of Eeyou Istchee James Bay (municipality) in the area of the Nord-du-Québec, Canadian province of Quebec, Canada.

The course of the Iserhoff river successively crosses the townships of Desjardins, Berthiaume and Bergeres.

The hydrographic slope of the Iserhoff River is accessible from roads R1026 (North-South) and R1018 (North-South). These two roads are connected to the South at road 113 linking Lebel-sur-Quévillon to Chibougamau.

The surface of the Iserhoff River is usually frozen from early November to mid-May, however, safe ice circulation is generally from mid-November to mid-April.

== Geography ==
The main hydrographic slopes near the Iserhoff River are:

- North side: Isernoff River North, Waswanipi River, Goéland Lake (Waswanipi River), Imbault Brook;
- East side: Lake Waswanipi, Bachelor River;
- South side: Florence River, Wedding River, Bell River;
- West side: Bell River, Indian River (Bell River).

The Iserhoff River originates at the mouth of a little lake in mountains at an elevation of 369 metres (1,211 ft) at:

- 31.1 kilometres (19.3 mi) South-west of the mouth of the Iserhoff River (confluence with Lake Waswanipi;
- 48.6 kilometres (30.2 mi) South-west of the mouth of Lake Waswanipi (confluence with the Waswanipi River);
- 46.7 kilometres (29.0 mi) South of the mouth of Goéland Lake (Waswanipi River);
- 74.5 kilometres (46.3 mi) Southeast of the mouth of Matagami Lake;
- 243.8 kilometres (151.5 mi) Southeast of the mouth of the Nottaway River;
- 53.9 kilometres (33.5 mi) Southeast of downtown Matagami.

From its source, the "Iserhoff River" flows on 92.0 kilometres (57.2 mi) according to the following segments:

Course of the Upper Iserhoff River (segment of 78.3 kilometres (48.7 mi)).

- 3.1 kilometres (1.9 mi) northeasterly in the canton of Desjardins, to the southern limit of the township of Berthiaume;
- 20.1 kilometres (12.5 mi) eastwards in the township of Berthiaume, passing on the south side of Mount Kitci (summit at 401 metres (1,316 ft)), to the western limit of the township of Bergeres;
- 4.7 kilometres (2.9 mi) north-east in the township of Bergères, until the confluence of two streams (coming from the North and the other from the South);
- 8.1 kilometres (5.0 mi) northeasterly, then north, to Imbault Brook;

Course of the Lower Iserhoff River (segment of 13.7 kilometres (8.5 mi))

- 5.1 kilometres (3.2 mi) east westerly to the confluence of the Iserhoff North River;
- 5.1 kilometres (3.2 mi) east to the R1018 forest road bridge;
- 3.5 kilometres (2.2 mi) easterly winding into a marsh zone to its mouth.

The Iserhoff River flows into the Southwest Bay of Lake Waswanipi. From this mouth, the current flows East, then North, on the Lake Waswanipi to its mouth. From there, the current flows first north through the Waswanipi River, then west to the east shore of Goéland Lake. The latter is crossed to the northwest by the Waswanipi River which is a tributary of Matagami Lake.

The mouth of the Iserhoff River located at:

- 21.7 kilometres (13.5 mi) south-west of the mouth of Lake Waswanipi;
- 21.2 kilometres (13.2 mi) southeast of a bay south of Goéland Lake (Waswanipi River);
- 42.8 kilometres (26.6 mi) southeast of the mouth of Goéland Lake (Waswanipi River);
- 55.9 kilometres (34.7 mi) southeast of the mouth of Olga Lake (Waswanipi River);
- 59.9 kilometres (37.2 mi) south-west of the village center of Waswanipi;
- North of downtown Matagami

== Toponymy ==
This hydronym appears on an 1896 map of Surveyor Robert Bell, indicating it as a tributary of the Nottaway River. The name of this river evokes a missionary active in the region in the nineteenth century; in 1905, Henry O'Sullivan announced his presence at Fort Eastmain.

A natural extension of [Mistassini Lake], called Baie Iserhoff, also evokes Charles Iserhoff, nephew of this missionary employed by the Hudson's Bay Company, at the former trading post of Baie-du-Poste; this site has become today the Cree village of Mistissini. This hydronym is reported in both editions of the Dictionary of Rivers and Lakes of the Province of Quebec (1914 and 1925). Jacques and Madeleine Rousseau used in 1946 the services of an informant (born Iserhoff), and then bearing the name of Mrs. Wilfrid Jefferys; according to his testimony, the members of this Métis family have always lived at either the Mistassini Lake or the Waswanipi station.

This river is designated in the Cree community "Packîwâgâ Sîbî", meaning "river digs the bank, so that there is an overhang".

The toponym "Iserhoff River" was formalized on December 5, 1968, at the Commission de toponymie du Québec, i.e. at the creation of this commission

== See also ==
- James Bay
- Rupert Bay
- Nottaway River, a watercourse
- Matagami Lake, a body of water
- Waswanipi River, a watercourse
- Goéland Lake (Waswanipi River), a body of water
- Lake Waswanipi, a body of water
- List of rivers of Quebec
