= Chensagi River =

Chensagi
- Watershed of Nottaway River

Location
- Country: Canada
- Province: Quebec
- Region: Eeyou Istchee Baie-James (municipality)

Physical characteristics
- Source: De la Pinède Grise Lake
  - location: Eeyou Istchee Baie-James (municipality), Nord-du-Québec, Quebec
  - coordinates: 50°19′27″N 76°12′46″W
  - elevation: 332 m (1,089 ft)
- Mouth: Maicasagi Lake
  - location: Eeyou Istchee Baie-James (municipality), Nord-du-Québec, Quebec
  - coordinates: 50°01′26″N 76°43′30″W
  - elevation: 262 m (860 ft)
- Length: 99.1 km (61.6 mi)

Basin features
- Tributaries
  - left: Chensagi River East
  - right: (from the mouth) Frédérique creek, Chensagi River West

The Chensagi River is a tributary of Maicasagi Lake, in Regional County Municipality (RCM) of Eeyou Istchee James Bay (municipality), in the administrative region from Nord-du-Québec, in the Canadian province of Quebec, in Canada.

The lower course of the river successively crosses the townships of Dambourges and Grandfontaine.

The Chensagi River watershed is served by the northern route from Matagami to 29.3 kilometres (18.2 mi) west of the mouth of the Chensagi River. The surface of the river is usually frozen from early November to mid-May, however, safe ice circulation is generally from mid-November to mid-April.

== Geography ==
The main hydrographic slopes near the Chensagi River are:

- North side: Chensagi River West, Amisquioumisca Lake, Nipukatasi River, Rocher Lake;
- East side: Chensagi River East, Maicasagi River, Moquachéa Lake;
- South side: Chensagi River East, Maicasagi River;
- West side: Poncheville Lake, Quenonisca Lake, Nipukatasi River.

The Chensagi River originates at the mouth of Gray Pine Lake (length: 2.2 kilometres (1.4 mi), altitude: 332 metres (1,089 ft)). This mountainous lake receives the waters of eight small mountain lakes.

The mouth of this head lake is located at:

- 49.7 kilometres (30.9 mi) Northeast of the mouth of the Chensagi River (confluence with Maicasagi Lake;
- 73.5 kilometres (45.7 mi) Northeast of the mouth of Goéland Lake (Waswanipi River);

North of the mouth of the Matagami Lake;

- 103.8 kilometres (64.5 mi) Northeast of the mouth of Soscumica Lake;
- 219 kilometres (136 mi) Southeast of the mouth of the Nottaway River);
- 119 kilometres (74 mi) Northeast of downtown Matagami.

From its source, the "Chensagi River" flows on 99.1 kilometres (61.6 mi) according to the following segments:

Upper course of Chensagi river (segment of 30.7 kilometres (19.1 mi)).

- 9.2 kilometres (5.7 mi) Northwesterly, forming a southwesterly curve to a river bend where a stream flows (from the north);
- 15.7 kilometres (9.8 mi) Southwesterly to a creek (from the east);
- 5.9 kilometres (3.7 mi) to the Southwest, to the outlet of the lake? (coming from the East);

Intermediate course of Chensagi River (segment of 36.3 kilometres (22.6 mi))

- 5.0 kilometres (3.1 mi) West to a creek (coming from the North);
- 7.4 kilometres (4.6 mi) Southwesterly, to a creek (coming from the North);
- 6.9 kilometres (4.3 mi) Southwesterly to a bend of the river where a stream flows (from the North);
- 5.4 kilometres (3.4 mi) South, to the confluence of the Chensagi River East (coming from the East);
- 7.7 kilometres (4.8 mi) Southwesterly, forming a southerly curve to the confluence of the Chensagi River West (coming from the North);
- 3.9 kilometres (2.4 mi) Southwesterly in a straight line to the East shore of Chensagi Lake;

Lower course of Chensagi River (segment of 32.1 kilometres (19.9 mi))

- 11.3 kilometres (7.0 mi) Southwesterly, crossing the Chensagi Lake (length: 14.4 kilometres (8.9 mi); altitude: 202 metres (663 ft)), to its mouth in the southwestern part of the lake;
- 6.0 kilometres (3.7 mi) southeasterly in a widening of the river to Frederique Creek (coming from the Southwest);
- 0.4 kilometres (0.25 mi) southerly in a widening of the river to its mouth.

The "Chensagi River" flows to the bottom of the North-West Bay of Maicasagi Lake. The latter flows southwesterly through the Max Passage into Goéland Lake which is crossed to the northwest by the Waswanipi River.

The mouth of the Chensagi River is located at:

- 10.9 kilometres (6.8 mi) North of the mouth of Lake Maicasagi.
- 24.4 kilometres (15.2 mi) Northeast of the mouth of Goéland Lake (Waswanipi River);
- 38.4 kilometres (23.9 mi) Northeast of the mouth of Olga Lake (Waswanipi River);
- 65.7 kilometres (40.8 mi) Northwest of the village center of Waswanipi;
- 72.3 kilometres (44.9 mi) North of downtown of Matagami.

== Toponymy ==
The toponym "Chensagi River" was formalized on December 5, 1968, at the Commission de toponymie du Québec, i.e. at the creation of this commission

== See also ==
- James Bay
- Rupert Bay
- Nottaway River, a watercourse
- Matagami Lake, a body of water
- Waswanipi River, a watercourse
- Goéland Lake (Waswanipi River), a body of water
- Chensagi Lake, a body of water
- Maicasagi Lake, a body of water
- Chensagi River East, a watercourse
- Chensagi River West, a watercourse
- List of rivers of Quebec
