= Salamandre Lake =

Lake in Nord-du-Québec, Quebec, Canada

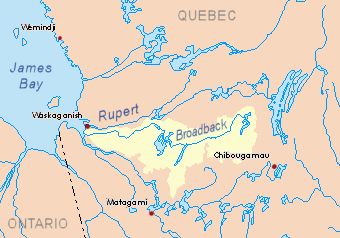
- Watershed of Broadback River

- Location within Quebec
- Location: Eeyou Istchee Baie-James (municipality) (RCM)
- Coordinates: 50°37′10″N 76°38′38″W
- Type: Natural
- Primary inflows: Some forested creeks
- Primary outflows: Salamandre River
- Basin countries: Canada
- Max. length: 14.9 kilometres (9.3 mi)
- Max. width: 2.9 kilometres (1.8 mi)
- Surface elevation: 265 metres (869 ft)

The Salamandre Lake is a freshwater body of the municipality of Eeyou Istchee Baie-James (municipality), in the administrative region of Nord-du-Québec, in Quebec, in Canada. The northern part of the lake is crossed to the West by the Broadback River.

Forestry is the main economic activity of the sector. Recreational tourism activities come second with an upstream navigable waterbody including the Broadback River and the Nipukatasi River.

The southern part of the Salamandre Lake hydrographic slope is accessible via a forest road (east–west) coming from the west and connecting the main road going north. The surface of Salamandre Lake is usually frozen from early November to mid-May; however, safe ice circulation is generally from mid-November to mid-April.

== Geography ==
The Salamandre Lake is part of a group of lakes in the same area, which are formed in length, more or less parallel to each other, on the east side of which Quénonisca Lake, the Rocher Lake crossed by the Nipukatasi River and Amisquioumisca Lake (east side). While on the west side, the major body of water is Evans Lake.

Salamander Lake has a length of 14.9 kilometres (9.3 mi), a width of 2.9 kilometres (1.8 mi), an altitude of 265 kilometres (165 mi) and an area of . The Salamandre Lake is mainly fed by forest streams. The areas around the lake have a generally leveled topography.

The mouth of Salamandre Lake is located at:

- 12.9 kilometres (8.0 mi) south of the mouth of the Salamandre River (confluence with the Broadback River);
- 44.8 kilometres (27.8 mi) south-east of the mouth of Evans Lake which is crossed by the Broadback River;
- 175.7 kilometres (109.2 mi) east of the mouth of the Broadback River;
- 125 kilometres (78 mi) north-east of downtown Matagami;
- 178.4 kilometres (110.9 mi) west of downtown Chibougamau.

The Salamandre River (length: 47.3) is the outlet of the Salamandre Lake, which flows into the South Bank of the Broadback River westerly across the Broadback River over 15.3 kilometres (9.5 mi) to the east bank of Corbeau Bay, an extension of Evans Lake.

== Geology ==
The "Rocher-Salamandre intrusive suite" includes the Whitefish Intrusion (nAwf) which outcrops mainly between the Salamandre lakes and Rocher (NTS sheets 32K09 and 32K10), the Rock Intrusion (nAlrc) and another small peridotite intrusion of less than 15 kilometres (9.3 mi) in diameter that cuts the paragneisses of the "Rock Complex" (nAroc) and the migmatitic gneisses of the "Bétulaie Complex" (nAbtu) in the area of Rocher Lake (NTS sheet 32K09).

This convert was originally described as the "Rock-Kenonisca Massif" by Franconi (1974) in his report on the mapping of the western half of the Frotet-Evans volcano-sedimentary band. It was renamed "Rocher-Salamander Intrusive Suite" by Brisson et al. (1998) when mapping the Lake Rocher area (NTS sheet 32K09). The addition of Whitefish Intrusion (nAwf) and Rock Intrusion (nAlrc) as lithodemes in the Intrusive Suite of Rocher-Salamandre is proposed following the fieldwork and compilation of Leclerc and Caron-Côté (2017).

== Toponymy ==
In the past, this body of water was designated "Big Whitefis Lake" or the French version "Lac Poisson Blanc".

The toponym lac Salamandre was formalized on December 5, 1968, at the Commission de toponymie du Québec, at the creation of this commission.

== See also ==
- Broadback River, a watercourse
- Evans Lake, a body of water
- Salamandre River, a watercourse
- Eeyou Istchee James Bay (municipality)
- List of lakes in Canada
