= Quénonisca Lake =

Lake in Nord-du-Québec, Quebec, Canada

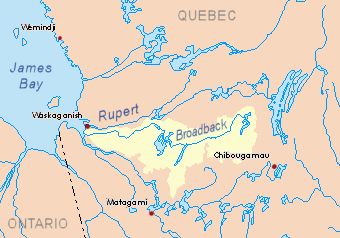
- Watershed of Broadback River

- Location within Quebec
- Location: Eeyou Istchee Baie-James (municipality) (RCM)
- Coordinates: 50°35′57″N 76°32′03″W
- Type: Natural
- Primary inflows: Broadback River, outlet of lake Opataouaga
- Primary outflows: Marquette River West
- Basin countries: Canada
- Max. length: 7.6 kilometres (4.7 mi)
- Max. width: 1.4 kilometres (0.87 mi)
- Surface area: 51.68 kilometres (32.11 mi)
- Surface elevation: 438 metres (1,437 ft)

The Quenonisca Lake is a freshwater body of the municipality of Eeyou Istchee Baie-James (Municipality), in the administrative region of Nord-du-Québec, Quebec, Canada. The northern part of the lake is crossed to the West by the Broadback River.

Forestry is the main economic activity of the sector. Recreational tourism activities come second with an upstream navigable water body including the Broadback River and the Nipukatasi River.

The southern portion of the Quenonisca Lake hydrographic slope is accessible via a forest road (east–west direction) from the west, connecting the road going North.

The surface of Quénonisca Lake is usually frozen from early November to mid-May, however, safe ice circulation is generally from mid-November to mid-April.

== Geography ==
Quénonisca Lake is part of a group of lakes in the same area, which are formed in length, more or less parallel to each other, including the Salamander Lake (west side), the Rocher Lake (East side) crossed by the Nipukatasi River and Amisquioumisca Lake (East side).

Quenonisca Lake has a length of 56.9 kilometres (35.4 mi), a width of 3.2 kilometres (2.0 mi) [[James Bay]], an elevation of 258 kilometres (160 mi) and an area of 51.68 square kilometres (19.95 sq mi).

Lake Quenonisca is mainly fed by the outlet of Lake Opataouaga, coming from the South and discharging at the bottom of a bay (length: 8.9 kilometres (5.5 mi)) on the South-East shore; and by the dump of La Peupleraie lake pouring on the North-West shore. In addition, the Broadback River crosses the northern part of Quenonisca Lake to the west.

Quenonisca Lake is made up of 49 islands, one 5.1 kilometres (3.2 mi) at its mouth and another 5.0 kilometres (3.1 mi) in length near the southern part of Salamander Lake (lake neighbor on the northwest side).

Areas around the lake have a generally level topography, except for:

- North-east side, near the mouth of the lake where the summit of Mount Scott rises to 349 metres (1,145 ft) at 2.3 kilometres (1.4 mi) from the southeast shore;
- South side, where there are several mountains.

== Geology ==
The "Intrusive Rocher-Quenonisca Suite" includes the Whitefish Intrusion (nAwf) that outcrops mainly between lakes Quenonisca and Rocher (NTS sheets 32K09 and 32K10), Rocher Intrusion (nAlrc) and another small peridotite intrusion of less than 15 kilometres (9.3 mi) in diameter that cuts the paragneisses of the "Rock Complex" (nAroc) and the migmatitic gneisses of the "Bétulaie Complex" (nAbtu) in the area of Rocher Lake (NTS sheet 32K09).

This convert was originally described as the "Rock-Kenonisca Massif" by Franconi (1974) in his report on the mapping of the western half of the Frotet-Evans volcano-sedimentary band. It was renamed "Rocher-Quénonisca Intrusive Suite" by Brisson (1998) when mapping the Lac Rocher region (NTS sheet 32K09). The addition of the Whitefish Intrusion (nAwf) and the Rock Intrusion (nAlrc) as lithodemes in the Rocher-Quénonisca Intrusive Suite is proposed as a result of Leclerc and Caron-Côté field work and compilation. (2017).

== Toponymy ==
Of Cree origin (Eastern Cree, Northern dialect), this hydronym means "the long lake".

The toponym Lac Quénonisca was formalized on December 5, 1968, at the Commission de toponymie du Québec, at the creation of this commission.

== See also ==
- Broadback River
- Evans Lake
- Eeyou Istchee James Bay (municipality)
- List of lakes in Canada
