= Maicasagi Lake =

Lake in Quebec

- Watershed of Nottaway River

- Location within Quebec
- Location: Baie-James
- Coordinates: 49°56′44″N 76°39′01″W
- Type: Natural
- Primary inflows: Waswanipi River, Chensagi River
- Primary outflows: Waswanipi River
- Basin countries: Canada
- Max. length: 14.7 kilometres (9.1 mi)
- Max. width: 8.6 kilometres (5.3 mi)
- Surface elevation: 262 metres (860 ft)

Lake Maicasagi is a body of freshwater located in the territory of Eeyou Istchee Baie-James (municipality), in the administrative region of Nord-du-Québec, in the province of Quebec, in Canada.

The surface of lake Maicasagi extends mainly into the townships of Johnstone and Urfé; and in the Township of Grandfontaine up the Northwest Bay to the mouth of the Chensagi River.

Forestry is the main economic activity of the sector. Recreational tourism activities come second.

The hydrographic slope of Lake Maicasagi is accessible from the west side by the forest road that separates from the James Bay road from the southwest (coming from Matagami). The other access road is located on the east side and passes on the south side of Goéland Lake (Waswanipi River), and then ascends northward across the Waswanipi River.

The surface of Lake Maicasagi is usually frozen from early November to mid-May, however, safe ice circulation is generally from mid-November to mid-April.

== Geography ==
This lake has a length of 14.7 kilometres (9.1 mi), a maximum width of 8.6 kilometres (5.3 mi) and an altitude of 262 metres (860 ft). Lake Maicasagi is part of a large watershed that also includes Maicasagi Lakes (northeast), Waswanipi (southeast), Olga (west), and Goéland).

Lake Maicasagi has several bays and islands. The main bays are North West, Southwest, East and the Bay leading to the Max Passage. Located to the southwest of the lake, the Max Passage has a length of 10.5 kilometres (6.5 mi), connecting Lake Maicasagi and Goéland Lake.

Lake Maicasagi is mainly fed by the Chensagi River (coming from the North) and the Maicasagi River (coming from the East).

The mouth of Lake Maicasagi is located at the bottom of a bay in the Southwest Passage Max. This mouth is located at:

- 15.7 kilometres (9.8 mi) North-East of the mouth of Goéland Lake;
- 56.9 kilometres (35.4 mi) East of the mouth of Matagami Lake;
- 66.7 kilometres (41.4 mi) Northeast of the village center of Matagami;
- 80.5 kilometres (50.0 mi) Southeast of the mouth of Soscumica Lake.

The main hydrographic slopes near Lac Maicasagi are:

- North side: Chensagi River, Chensagi Lake;
- East side: Maicasagi River, Nomans River;
- South side: Goéland Lake (Waswanipi River), Iserhoff River, Iserhoff River North, Imbault Creek;
- West side: Matagami Lake, Olga Lake (Waswanipi River), Opaoca River.

== Toponymy ==
The toponym "Lake Maicasagi" was officialized on December 5, 1968 by the Commission de toponymie du Québec, when it was created.

== See also ==
- James Bay
- Rupert Bay
- Nottaway River, a watercourse
- Matagami Lake, a body of water
- Waswanipi River, a watercourse
- Chensagi River, a watercourse
- Maicasagi River, a watercourse
- Eeyou Istchee Baie-James (municipality), a municipality
- List of lakes in Canada
