= Maicasagi River =

Maicasagi
- Watershed of Nottaway River

Location
- Country: Canada
- Province: Quebec
- Region: Eeyou Istchee Baie-James (municipality)

Physical characteristics
- Source: Lake Caminscanane
  - location: Eeyou Istchee Baie-James (municipality), Nord-du-Québec, Quebec
  - coordinates: 50°26′59″N 76°00′55″W
  - elevation: 332 m (1,089 ft)
- Mouth: Maicasagi Lake
  - location: Eeyou Istchee Baie-James (municipality), Nord-du-Québec, Quebec
  - coordinates: 49°57′20″N 76°33′12″W
  - elevation: 262 m (860 ft)
- Length: 152.2 km (94.6 mi)

Basin features
- Tributaries
  - left: (from the mouth) Inconnue River (Maicasagi River), De la Trève River, Omo River, Monsan River
  - right: Discharge of Lake Yapuouichi

The Maicasagi River is a tributary of Maicasagi Lake. This river flows from the municipality of Eeyou Istchee Baie-James (municipality), in the administrative region of Nord-du-Québec, in Quebec, in Canada.

The lower half of the river flows through the cantons of De Berey, De Doreil, De Clérin, De Branssat, De Davost, De Monseignat and De Urfé.

The hydrographic slope of the Maicasagi River is served by the R1018 (North-South) secondary road from Matagami, which spans the Maicasagi River at 4.2 kilometres (2.6 mi) from its mouth. The surface of the river is usually frozen from early November to mid-May, however, safe ice circulation is generally from mid-November to mid-April.

== Geography ==
The main hydrographic slopes near the Maicasagi River are:

- North side: Yapuouichi Lake, Caupichigau Lake, Monsan River, Chensagi River;
- East side: Omo River, La Trêve River, Caupichigau River;
- South side: Waswanipi River, Lake Waswanipi, Inconnue River (Maicasagi River), Nomans River;
- West side: Maicasagi Lake, Goéland Lake (Waswanipi River), Waswanipi River.

Caminscanane Lake (length: 11.0 kilometres (6.8 mi) in a north-south direction; maximum width: 2.25 kilometres (1.40 mi); altitude: 332 metres (1,089 ft)) is the head lake of the Maicasagi River. This lake feeds on the north side by the discharge of four upstream lakes including Morain Lake, and on the south side by two lakes upstream.

The mouth of Lake Caminscanane is located at:

- 13.8 kilometres (8.6 mi) Northeast of the mouth of Maicasagi Lake;
- 64.5 kilometres (40.1 mi) Northeast of the mouth of the Maicasagi River (confluence with Maicasagi Lake);
- 93.0 kilometres (57.8 mi) Northeast of Goéland Lake (Waswanipi River);
- 115.8 kilometres (72.0 mi) Northeast of the mouth of Matagami Lake;
- 225 kilometres (140 mi) Southeast of the mouth of the Nottaway River);
- 138.5 kilometres (86.1 mi) North of downtown Matagami

From the mouth of the head lake, the "Maicasagi River" flows over 152.2 kilometres (94.6 mi) according to the following segments:

Upper course of the Maicasagi River (segment of 23.4 kilometres (14.5 mi))

- 10.7 kilometres (6.6 mi) East, then South winding at the end of the segment, to the North shore of an unidentified lake;
- 6.8 kilometres (4.2 mi) southerly crossing an unidentified lake (elevation: 329 metres (1,079 ft)) over its full length;
- 5.9 kilometres (3.7 mi) southerly crossing Lake Moquachéa (length: 6.5 kilometres (4.0 mi); altitude: 327 metres (1,073 ft));

Intermediate course of the Maicasagi River (segment of 50.2 kilometres (31.2 mi))

- 8.5 kilometres (5.3 mi) to the South winding up to a creek (coming from the west);
- 9.5 kilometres (5.9 mi) to the Southeast, to the outlet of a lake (coming from the Northeast);
- 11.9 kilometres (7.4 mi) Southeasterly winding to the northwestern shore of Lake Monsan;
- 4.7 kilometres (2.9 mi) Southwesterly crossing Lake Monsan (length: 5.8 kilometres (3.6 mi); altitude: 323 metres (1,060 ft));
- 11.7 kilometres (7.3 mi) to South, then south-east winding to a creek (coming from the Southwest);
- 3.9 kilometres (2.4 mi) to South, to the confluence of the Omo River;

Lower course of the Maicasagi River (segment of 78.6 kilometres (48.8 mi))

- 2.9 kilometres (1.8 mi) southwesterly to a creek (coming from the west);
- 14.9 kilometres (9.3 mi) southwesterly to the confluence of the La Trève River (coming from the East);
- 26.4 kilometres (16.4 mi) west to a creek (coming from the North);
- 9.7 kilometres (6.0 mi) southwesterly to the confluence of the Inconnue River (Maicasagi River) (coming from the South);
- 24.7 kilometres (15.3 mi) westward through the township of Urfe to its mouth.

The "Maicasagi River" flows on the eastern shore of Maicasagi Lake which in turn flows through the Southwest via the Max Passage into Goéland Lake. The latter is crossed to the northwest by the Waswanipi River which is a tributary of Matagami Lake.

The mouth of the Maicasagi River located at:

- 13.8 kilometres (8.6 mi) Northeast of the mouth of Maicasagi Lake;
- 28.7 kilometres (17.8 mi) Northeast of the mouth of Goéland Lake (Waswanipi River);
- 47.0 kilometres (29.2 mi) Northeast of the mouth of Olga Lake (Waswanipi River);
- 54.2 kilometres (33.7 mi) Northwest of the village center of Waswanipi;
- 80.1 kilometres (49.8 mi) Northeast of downtown Matagami.

At the end of the journey, the Maicasagi River flows into Maicasagi Lake. This lake flows southward through the Max Pass into Gull Lake (Waswanipi River). This last stretch of water is formed by a large widening of the Waswanipi River.

== Toponymy ==
The toponym "Maicasagi River" is of Native American origin. This toponym is on a map dated 1955.

The toponym "Maicasagi River" was formalized on December 5, 1968, at the Commission de toponymie du Québec, i.e. at the creation of this commission.

== See also ==
- Eeyou Istchee Baie-James (municipality), a municipality
- James Bay
- Rupert Bay
- Nottaway River, a watercourse
- Matagami Lake, a body of water
- Waswanipi River
- Goéland Lake (Waswanipi River), a body of water
- Maicasagi Lake, a body of water
- List of rivers of Quebec
