= Nipukatasi River =

River in Nord-du-Québec, Quebec, Canada

Nipukatasi
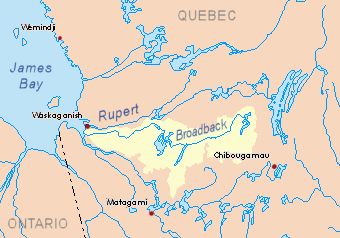
- Watershed of Broadback River

Location
- Country: Canada
- Province: Quebec
- Region: Eeyou Istchee Baie-James (municipality)

Physical characteristics
- Source: Forested lake
  - location: Eeyou Istchee Baie-James (municipality), Nord-du-Québec, Quebec
  - coordinates: 50°29′31″N 76°03′19″W
  - elevation: 410 m (1,350 ft)
- Mouth: Broadback River
  - location: Eeyou Istchee Baie-James (municipality), Nord-du-Québec, Quebec
  - coordinates: 50°43′45″N 76°12′49″W
  - elevation: 252 m (827 ft)
- Length: 115.4 km (71.7 mi)

The Nipukatasi River is a tributary of the Broadback River flowing west to Rupert Bay, south of James Bay. The Nipukatasi River flows in the municipality of Eeyou Istchee Baie-James (municipality), in the administrative region of Nord-du-Québec, in Quebec, in Canada.

== Geography ==
The surrounding hydrographic slopes of the Nipukatasi River are:

- North side: Broadback River;
- East side: Amisquioumisca lake, Caminscanane lake;
- South side: Opataouaga Lake, Poncheville Lake, Maicasagi River;
- West side: Lake Quenonisca, Lake Salamander, Evans Lake.

A small unnamed lake (length: 0.5 kilometres (0.31 mi), elevation: 410 metres (1,350 ft)) is the head of the Nipukatasi River. This lake is located 1.6 kilometres (0.99 mi) northwest of Lake Caminscanane, 2.7 kilometres (1.7 mi) southwest of Morain Lake and southeast of Lake Bétulaie.

=== Course downstream of the head lake ===
(37.9 kilometres (23.5 mi) segment)

From this head lake, the Nipukatasi River flows 3.4 kilometres (2.1 mi) to the northeast more or less parallel to the west shore of Morain Lake. Then the river branches westward to flow 4.4 kilometres (2.7 mi) into marsh areas, to the east bank of Lake Bétulaie (length: 4.3 kilometres (2.7 mi), altitude: 312 metres (1,024 ft)), which the current crosses on 3.0 kilometres (1.9 mi) to the west. Then the Nipukatasi River flows for 14.6 kilometres (9.1 mi) first for 1.1 kilometres (0.68 mi) to the north, then to the southwest more or less parallel to the northwestern shore of Lake Bétulaie through marsh areas. except on the last 2.7 kilometres (1.7 mi). The river flows on the north shore of Amisquioumisca Lake as the current flows 12.5 kilometres (7.8 mi) to the southwest.

=== Segment downstream from Amisquioumisca lake ===
(77.5 kilometres (48.2 mi) segment)

Amisquioumisca Lake (length: 12.5 kilometres (7.8 mi); elevation: 302 metres (991 ft)) is the main body of water on the Nipukatasi River. Its mouth is located southwest of the lake.

From the mouth of this lake, the Nipukatasi River first flows 3.0 kilometres (1.9 mi) to the west. The river branches north to flow 8.6 kilometres (5.3 mi) to a dump from the east. Then the river reorients itself for 15.8 kilometres (9.8 mi) to the southwest. Next, the river branches north for 11.6 kilometres (7.2 mi) to the south shore of Lake Rocher (elevation 255 metres (837 ft)), which flows 26.4 kilometres (16.4 mi) (full length) to the northeast. In its last segment, the river flows 12.1 kilometres (7.5 mi) to the northeast crossing a lake (length: 6.4 kilometres (4.0 mi), altitude: 253 metres (830 ft)).

The Nipukatasi River flows on the south shore of the Broadback River upstream of Quenonisca Lake.

== Toponymy ==
The toponym Nipukatasi River was formalized on December 5, 1968, at the Commission de toponymie du Québec.

== See also ==
- James Bay
- Rupert Bay
- Broadback River, a watercourse
- Eeyou Istchee James Bay (municipality)
- Jamésie
- List of rivers of Quebec
