= Goéland Lake =

Lake in Quebec, Canada

Lac au Goéland (Goéland Lake)
- Watershed of Nottaway River

- Location within Quebec
- Location: Baie-James
- Coordinates: 49°47′44″N 76°47′12″W
- Type: Natural
- Primary inflows: Waswanipi River, Chensagi River, Maicasagi River
- Primary outflows: Waswanipi River
- Basin countries: Canada
- Max. length: 36 kilometres (22 mi)
- Max. width: 20 kilometres (12 mi)
- Surface area: 251 kilometres (156 mi)
- Surface elevation: 262 metres (860 ft)

The Lac au Goéland (English: Gull Lake) is a freshwater body of water crossed by the Waswanipi River and is located within Eeyou Istchee James Bay (municipality), within the administrative region of Nord-du-Québec, in the province of Quebec, in Canada.

The surface of "Lac au Goéland" extends into the cantons of Meulande, Dussieux, Bourbaux and Nignal.

Forestry is the main economic activity of the sector. Recreational tourism activities come second.

The hydrographic slope of "Lac au Goéland" is accessible via the James Bay road from the southwest (Matagami), then branches northwards by cutting the Canet River, located at Northwest of Goéland Lake. Forest roads serve the southern part of the lake.

The surface of Goéland Lake is usually frozen from early November to mid-May, however, safe ice movement is generally from mid-November to mid-April.

== Geography ==
This lake has a length of 36 kilometres (22 mi), a maximum width of 18 kilometres (11 mi) and an altitude of 263 metres (863 ft). "Goéland Lake" is part of a large watershed with lakes Maicasagi (Northeast), Waswanipi (Southeast) and Olga (West).

Goéland Lake has several peninsulas and 31 islands. The main bays are Ramsay Bay in the southwest and Lawrence Bay in the west. The Waswanipi River (tributary of Matagami Lake) flows northwest to Goéland Lake. The Max Passage is the length of 10.5 kilometres (6.5 mi) and connects the Lake Maicasagi, located to the Northeast. This last lake is in turn fed by the Chensagi River (coming from the North).

The mouth of "Lac au Goéland" is located at the bottom of a bay Northwest of the lake at:

- 20.1 kilometres (12.5 mi) East of the mouth of Olga Lake (at the mouth of the Waswanipi River);
- 15.7 kilometres (9.8 mi) Southwest of the mouth of Maicasagi Lake;
- 52.1 kilometres (32.4 mi) Northeast of the village center of Matagami;
- 48.1 kilometres (29.9 mi) East of the mouth of Matagami Lake.

The main hydrographic slopes near Lake Goéland are:

- North side: Chensagi River, Lake Maicasagi;
- East side: Waswanipi River, Waswanipi Lake;
- South side: Iserhoff River, Iserhoff North River, Imbault Creek;
- West side: Matagami Lake, Olga Lake (Waswanipi River), Opaoca River.

== Toponymy ==
This body of water was designated "Kiashk Lake" or "Kiask Lake" by the Cree Nation's Amerindians. Father Vaillancourt used the spelling Ch¯ - y¯asK, meaning "gull" because the islands served as refuges to several colonies of this bird swimmer and omnivore.

In his Journal (1819), explorer James Clouston uses the name Cheaskquachiston Lake. Other explorers of the day will also use the Cheashquacheston Lake form. In his 1895-1896 exploration report, Robert Bell translates this name by Gull Lake. Henry O'Sullivan uses the same name in 1901.

The 1946 map of the province of Quebec indicates "L. to the Gull. More recently, the designation "Heron Lake" has been raised. The term "Gull" is used in a good hundred other toponyms in Quebec, especially lakes.

The toponym "Lac au Goéland" was formalized on December 5, 1968, by the Commission de toponymie du Québec, when it was created.

== See also ==
- Nottaway River, a watercourse
- Matagami Lake, a body of water
- Waswanipi River, a watercourse
- Chensagi River, a watercourse
- Maicasagi Lake, a body of water
- Maicasagi River, a watercourse
- Eeyou Istchee Baie-James (municipality), a municipality
- List of lakes of Canada
