= Waswanipi River =

Waswanipi
- Watershed of Nottaway River

Location
- Country: Canada
- Province: Quebec
- Region: Eeyou Istchee Baie-James (municipality)

Physical characteristics
- Source: Confluence of Chibougamau River and Opawica River
  - location: Eeyou Istchee Baie-James (municipality), Nord-du-Québec, Quebec
  - coordinates: 49°41′07″N 75°57′49″W
  - elevation: 276 m (906 ft)
- Mouth: Matagami Lake
  - location: Eeyou Istchee Baie-James (municipality), Nord-du-Québec, Quebec
  - coordinates: 49°53′28″N 77°15′21″W
  - elevation: 256 m (840 ft)
- Length: 139.4 km (86.6 mi)
- Basin size: 31,900 km^{2} (12,300 sq mi)

Basin features
- Tributaries
  - left: (from the mouth) Opaoca River (via Olga Lake (Waswanipi River)), Little Waswanipi River, Iserhoff River (via Lake Waswanipi), O'Sullivan River (via Lake Waswanipi), Bachelor River, Opawica River
  - right: (from the mouth) Chensagi River (via Maicasagi Lake), Maicasagi River (via Maicasagi Lake), Chibougamau River

The Waswanipi River is a tributary of Matagami Lake. The Waswanipi River flows in the Municipality of Eeyou Istchee Baie-James in the administrative region of Nord-du-Québec, in Quebec, Canada.

== Geography ==
The main hydrographic slopes adjacent to the Waswanipi River are:

- North side: Nomans River, Inconnue River (Maicasagi River), Maicasagi River, La Trève River;
- East side: Chibougamau River, Opawica River;
- South side: Lake Waswanipi, O'Sullivan River, Wetetnagami River;
- West side: Matagami Lake, Bell River, Nottaway River.

The river originates in the village of Waswanipi, in the canton of Ghent, at the junction of the Chibougamau (coming from the east) and Opawica (coming from the South). This start of the Waswanipi River is located 80 kilometres (50 mi) southwest of Chapais and about 115 kilometres (71 mi) southwest of Chibougamau. A bridge spans the river at the village of Waswanipi.

From its source, the course of the river flows over 139.4 kilometres (86.6 mi) distributed as follows:

- 36.3 kilometres (22.6 mi) almost straight to the west up to a river elbow;
- 13.4 kilometres (8.3 mi) southwesterly to the northern part of Lake Waswanipi (length: 39.4 kilometres (24.5 mi); altitude: 267 metres (876 ft)) where the current bypasses several islands in a kind of delta;
- 27.5 kilometres (17.1 mi) to the north, then to the West up to the East bank of Goéland Lake (Waswanipi River);
- 21.3 kilometres (13.2 mi) to the north-west, crossing the Goéland Lake (Waswanipi River) (length: 36 kilometres (22 mi); altitude: 262 metres (860 ft));
- 30.9 kilometres (19.2 mi) to the West, forming a curve to the North, and crossing on 9.1 kilometres (5.7 mi) the Northern part of Olga Lake (Waswanipi River) (length: 27.5 kilometres (17.1 mi); altitude: 256 metres (840 ft)) up to its mouth;
- 10.0 kilometres (6.2 mi) to North-West up to the Nord-East bay of Matagami Lake.

The mouth of the Waswanipi River is located at:

- 25.1 kilometres (15.6 mi) south-east of the mouth of Matagami Lake;
- 30.5 kilometres (19.0 mi) north-east of downtown Matagami;
- 195 kilometres (121 mi) south-east of the mouth of the Nottaway River.

== Main tributaries ==
- Chensagi River (via Maicasagi Lake)
- Maicasagi River (via Maicasagi Lake)
- Chibougamau River
- Opaoca River (via Olga Lake (Waswanipi River))
- Little Waswanipi River
- Iserhoff River (via Lake Waswanipi)
- O'Sullivan River (via Lake Waswanipi)
- Bachelor River
- Opawica River

== Toponymy ==
As early as the 18th century, the designation "Waswanipi" means a lake Waswanipi, two rivers, and a Native American group. The river has already been referred to as the "Olga River". A map of 1898 indicates "R. Waswanipi" for this watercourse. At the beginning of the 20th century, during a voyage of exploration in northern Quebec, geologist and land surveyor Henry O'Sullivan borrowed this waterway.

The toponym Waswanipi River was formalized on December 5, 1968, at the Commission de toponymie du Quebec.

== See also ==
- James Bay
- Rupert Bay
- Nottaway River, a watercourse
- Matagami Lake, a water body
- Olga Lake (Waswanipi River)
- Goéland Lake (Waswanipi River)
- Lake Waswanipi, a water body
- Maicasagi Lake, a water body
- Opaoca River, a watercourse (via Olga lake)
- Chensagi River, a watercourse (via Goéland Lake)
- Maicasagi River, a watercourse (via Goéland Lake)
- Jamésie
- Eeyou Istchee Baie-James
- List of rivers of Quebec
