= Olga Lake =

Freshwater body in Canada

- Watershed of Nottaway River

- Location within Quebec
- Location: Baie-James
- Coordinates: 49°47′08″N 77°14′12″W
- Type: Natural
- Primary inflows: Waswanipi River, Opaoca River
- Primary outflows: Waswanipi River
- Basin countries: Canada
- Max. length: 27.5 kilometres (17.1 mi)
- Max. width: 18.8 kilometres (11.7 mi)
- Surface area: 106 kilometres (66 mi)
- Surface elevation: 256 metres (840 ft)

Olga Lake is a freshwater body crossed by the Waswanipi River and located in the southern part of Eeyou Istchee James Bay (municipality), in administrative region of the Nord-du-Québec, in the province of Quebec, in Canada.

Most of Olga Lake Olga surface is in Morris Township. Nevertheless, one bay upstream of the Waswanipi River extends into the township of Dussieux, and another bay stretches to the Southeast. While the southwestern portion of the lake extends into Pouchot Township (through Elizabeth Bay), Comporte Township and Lozeau Township.

Forestry is the main economic activity of the sector. Recreational tourism activities come second. This lake is said to be one of two lakes in the region that contain an unidentified species of fish called yûtinamekw, meaning "windfish" in the local Cree language.

The Olga Lake hydrographic slope is accessible via the James Bay Highway coming from the southwest (from Matagami), then branches northward by cutting the Canet River at the north of Lake Olga. The surface of Olga Lake is usually frozen from early November to mid-May, however, safe ice circulation is generally from mid-November to mid-April.

== Geography ==
This lake has a length of 27.5 kilometres (17.1 mi), a maximum width of 18.8 kilometres (11.7 mi) and an altitude of 256 metres (840 ft).

Lake Olga has many bays, peninsulas and islands. The Waswanipi River (tributary of Matagami Lake) runs westward through the northern part of Lake Olga.

Lake Olga also obtains supplies from the Southeast via the Opaoca River (via Elisabeth Bay), a creek from the Southwest, and the discharge (from the Northwest) of Lakes Caron and Gabrielle.

The mouth of this Olga Lake is located at the “Chute Rouge” (English: Red Falls) at the bottom of a bay north of the lake at:

- 5.8 kilometres (3.6 mi) southeast of Matagami Lake (at the mouth of the Waswanipi River);
- 18.4 kilometres (11.4 mi) east of Lac au Goéland;
- 33.3 kilometres (20.7 mi) northeast of the village center of Matagami;
- 35.1 kilometres (21.8 mi) southeast of Soscumica Lake.

The main hydrographic slopes near Lake Olga are:

- North side: Waswanipi River, Matagami Lake, Canet River;
- East side: Waswanipi River, Gull Lake;
- South side: Opaoca River, Bell River;
- West side: Matagami Lake, Bell River.

== Toponymy ==
The designation "Lake Olga" appears in the "Fifth Report of the Geographic Board of Canada 1904", published in Ottawa in 1905: "Olga; Lake southeast of Mattagami Lake, Abitibi District, Que". The origin and meaning of the place name are unexplained.

The toponym "lac Olga" was formalized on December 5, 1968, by the Commission de toponymie du Québec, when it was created.

== See also ==
- Nottaway River, a watercourse
- Lake Matagami, a body of water
- Waswanipi River, a watercourse
- Opaoca River, a watercourse
- Eeyou Istchee Baie-James (municipality), a municipality
- List of lakes in Canada
