= Lake Matagami =

Lake in Quebec, Canada

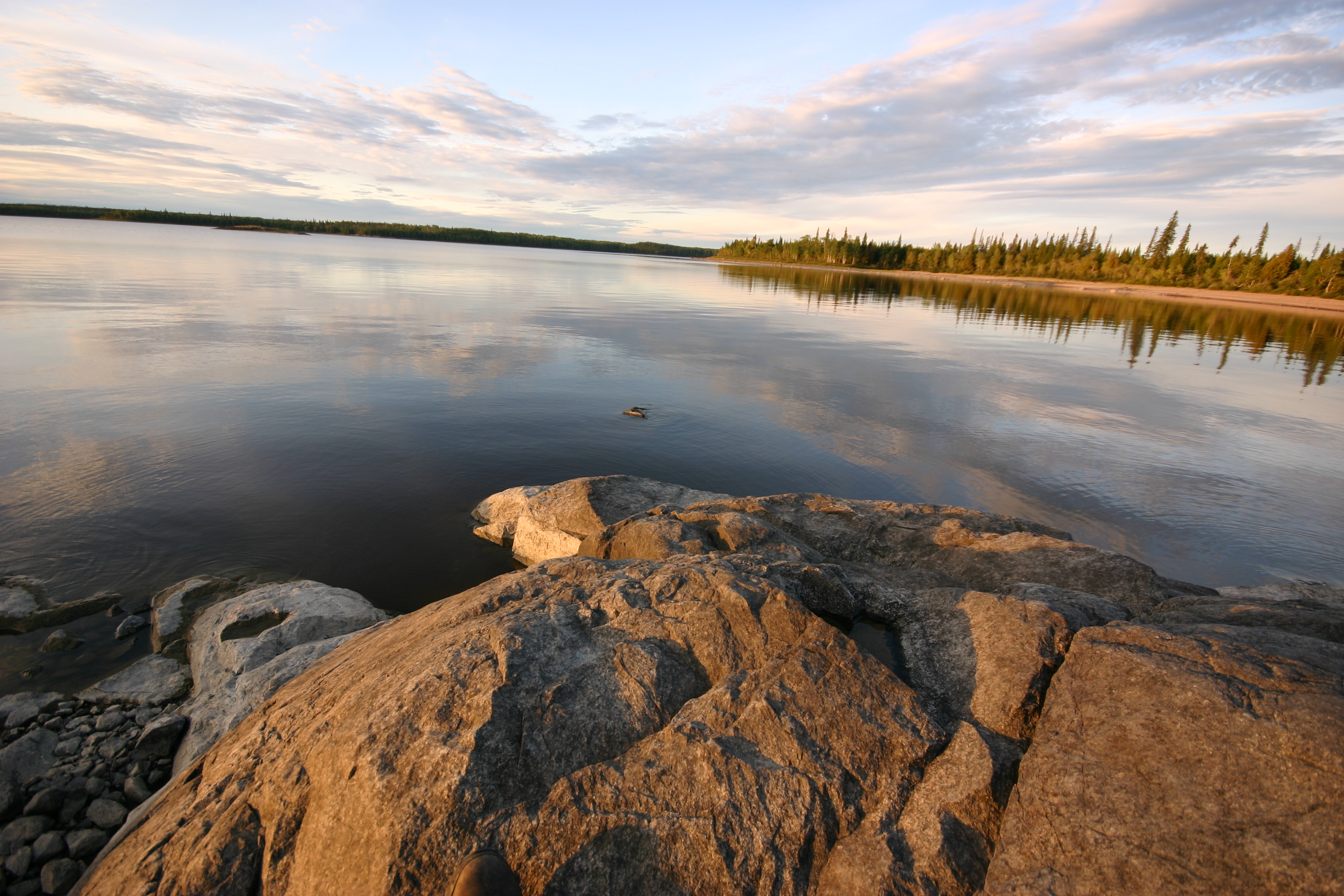

- Location within Quebec
- Location: Baie-James, near Matagami, Quebec
- Coordinates: 49°52′00″N 77°26′47″W
- Primary inflows: Allard River, Bell River, Gouault River, Waswanipi River.
- Primary outflows: Nottaway River
- Basin countries: Canada
- Max. length: 43 kilometres (27 mi)
- Max. width: 14 kilometres (8.7 mi)
- Surface area: 236 square kilometres (91 sq mi)

Lake Matagami is a lake in Jamésie, in Nord-du-Québec, in Quebec, in Canada. It is located just north-northeast of the town of Matagami.

== Geography ==
Located in a marshy area of northern Quebec, the lake created by the meeting of the rivers Allard, Bell, Gouault, the Canet and Waswanipi. This lake is about 14 kilometres (8.7 mi) wide, with a length of 43 kilometres (27 mi) and an area of 236 square kilometres (91 sq mi).

== History ==
Matagami Lake has long been used as a transportation route in the fur trade from the 18th century to the 20th century by the Hudson's Bay Company.

== Toponymy ==
In Cree, "matagami" means "meeting of waters", in reference to the large rivers that join.

== See also ==
- Nottaway River, a watercourse
- Gouault River, a watercourse
- Allard River, a watercourse
- Bell River, a watercourse
- Waswanipi River, a watercourse
- Canet River, a watercourse
- James Bay
- Matagami, Quebec
