= Subercase River =

River in Canada

Subercase
- Watershed of Nottaway River

Location
- Country: Canada
- Province: Quebec
- Region: Eeyou Istchee Baie-James (municipality)

Physical characteristics
- Source: Forested creek
  - location: Eeyou Istchee Baie-James (municipality), Nord-du-Québec, Quebec
  - coordinates: 49°41′11″N 78°05′01″W
  - elevation: 273 m (896 ft)
- Mouth: Grasset Lake
  - location: Eeyou Istchee Baie-James (municipality), Nord-du-Québec, Quebec
  - coordinates: 49°55′03″N 78°12′25″W
  - elevation: 250 m (820 ft)
- Length: 83.5 km (51.9 mi)

Basin features
- Tributaries
  - right: (upstream from the mouth) La Gauchetière crrek, De la Chute creek.

The Subercase River is a tributary of Grasset Lake (watershed of Nottaway River, in the Nord-du-Québec administrative region, in the Canadian province of Quebec, in Canada. The course of the river crosses the townships of Desmazures, Daloigny, La Gauchetière, Saint Hélène, Subercase and Grasset.

Forestry is the main economic activity of the sector. Recreational tourism activities (especially hunting and fishing) come second.

This hydrographic slope has some forest access roads. The surface of the river is usually frozen from early November to mid-May, however, safe ice circulation is generally from mid-November to mid-April.

== Geography ==
The main neighboring hydrographic slopes are:

- North side: Grasset Lake, Kitchigama River;
- East side: Deux Lacs River, Allard River, Lake Matagami, Soscumica Lake, Nottaway River;
- South side: Samson River, Adam River, Harricana River;
- West side: Samson River, Harricana River.

The "Subercase River" originates from a forest stream located at:

- 27.3 kilometres (17.0 mi) Southeast of the mouth of the Subercase River;
- 160.5 kilometres (99.7 mi) Southeast of the mouth of the Kitchigama River;
- 56.7 kilometres (35.2 mi) Southwest of the mouth of Lake Matagami;
- 35.5 kilometres (22.1 mi) to Southwest of downtown Matagami.

From its source in the township of Desmazures, the Subercase River flows over 83.5 kilometres (51.9 mi), especially in the marsh zone, according to the following segments:

- 11.7 kilometres (7.3 mi) northward in Desmazures township, to the limit of Daloigny township;
- 6.8 kilometres (4.2 mi) northerly forming a westerly curve in the township of Daloigny to the western limit of the township of Desmazures;
- 1.6 kilometres (0.99 mi) North in Desmazures Township to the southern limit of La Gauchetière township;
- 5.0 kilometres (3.1 mi) northward in the township of La Gauchetière, to the eastern limit of the township of Saint Hélène;
- 16.4 kilometres (10.2 mi) northwesterly in the township of Saint-Hélène skirting the Saint-Hélène Hills and crossing the southern portion of Long Lake to the southern limit of Township of Subercase;
- 8.1 kilometres (5.0 mi) northeasterly in the Township of Subercase across the northern portion of Long Lake to the western boundary of Grasset Township;
- 0.9 kilometres (0.56 mi) northeasterly in Grasset Township to mouth.

The Subercase River empties onto the South bank of the Nottaway River. This confluence is located at:

- 138.9 kilometres (86.3 mi) Southeast of the mouth of the Kitchigama River;
- 153 kilometres (95 mi) Southeast of the mouth of the Nottaway River (confluence with Rupert Bay);
- 30.0 kilometres (18.6 mi) West of downtown Matagami, Quebec;
- 35.9 kilometres (22.3 mi) West of the mouth of Matagami Lake.

== Toponymy ==
The term "Subercase" is a family name of English origin.

The toponym "Subercase River" was formalized on December 5, 1968, at the Commission de toponymie du Québec, i.e. at the creation of this commission.

== See also ==
- James Bay
- Rupert Bay
- Nottaway River
- Kitchigama River
- Grasset Lake
- List of rivers of Quebec
