= Richerville River =

Richerville

Location
- Country: Canada
- Province: Quebec
- Region: Eeyou Istchee Baie-James (municipality)

Physical characteristics
- Source: Richerville lake
  - location: Eeyou Istchee Baie-James (municipality), Nord-du-Québec, Quebec
  - coordinates: 50°49′47″N 78°11′15″W
  - elevation: 195 m (640 ft)
- Mouth: Nottaway River, Dusaux Lake
  - location: Eeyou Istchee Baie-James (municipality), Nord-du-Québec, Quebec
  - coordinates: 50°56′26″N 78°20′43″W
  - elevation: 109 m (358 ft)
- Length: 25.0 km (15.5 mi)

The Richerville River is a tributary of the Nottaway River, in the administrative region of Nord-du-Québec, in the Canadian province from Quebec, to Canada.

Forestry is the main economic activity of the sector. Recreational tourism activities (especially hunting and fishing) come second.

This hydrographic slope has no access forest road. The surface of the river is usually frozen from early November to mid-May, however, safe ice circulation is generally from mid-November to mid-April.

== Geography ==
The main neighboring hydrographic slopes are:

- North side: Nottaway River, Lepallier River;
- East side: Louvart River, Nottaway River;
- South side: Fabulet River, Iroquois River (Nottaway River);
- West side: Iroquois River (Nottaway River), Kitchigama River.

From its source, the Richerville River flows over 25.0 kilometres (15.5 mi) according to the following segments:

- 15.8 kilometres (9.8 mi) northwesterly to a bend in the river;
- 9.2 kilometres (5.7 mi) West to mouth.

The Richerville River flows on the south shore of Dusaux Lake which is crossed to the southwest by the Nottaway River. This confluence is located at:

- 44.4 kilometres (27.6 mi) south-east of the mouth of the Nottaway River (confluence with Rupert Bay);
- 140.7 kilometres (87.4 mi) North of downtown Matagami, Quebec
- 115.7 kilometres (71.9 mi) North of the mouth of the Matagami Lake.

== Toponymy ==
The term "Richerville" refers to a French commune located in the Department of Eure, in French region Normandy.

The toponym "Richerville" was formalized on December 5, 1968, at the Commission de toponymie du Québec, i.e. at the creation of this commission

== See also ==
- James Bay
- Rupert Bay
- Nottaway River
- Lake Soscumica
- List of rivers of Quebec
