= Pahunan River =

Pahunan
- Watershed of Nottaway River

Location
- Country: Canada
- Province: Quebec
- Region: Eeyou Istchee Baie-James (municipality)

Physical characteristics
- Source: Unidentified lake
  - location: Eeyou Istchee Baie-James (municipality), Nord-du-Québec, Quebec
  - coordinates: 49°59′14″N 77°58′08″W
  - elevation: 259 m (850 ft)
- Mouth: Kitchigama River
  - location: Eeyou Istchee Baie-James (municipality), Nord-du-Québec, Quebec
  - coordinates: 50°53′03″N 78°22′03″W
  - elevation: 239 m (784 ft)
- Length: 48.5 km (30.1 mi)

The River Pahunan is a tributary of the Kitchigama River, in the administrative region of Nord-du-Québec, in the Canadian province of Quebec. The course of this river flows in the townships of Grasset, the Forest and Paramé.

This hydrographic slope does have a winter roads going northward. The surface of the river is frozen from November to May.

== Geography ==
The main neighboring hydrographic slopes are:

- North side: Kitchigama River, Kashapuminatikuch Creek;
- East side: Deux Lacs River, Lake Soscumica;
- South side: Gouault River, Allard River;
- West side: Kitchigama River, Joncas River, Rouget River.

The Pahunan River originates from a small unidentified lake (elevation: 259 metres (850 ft)) located at:

- 131.6 kilometres (81.8 mi) Southeast of the course of the Nottaway River;
- 22.7 kilometres (14.1 mi) South of the mouth of Pahunan River;
- 131.6 kilometres (81.8 mi) Southeast of the mouth of the Kitchigama River;
- 160.7 kilometres (99.9 mi) Southeast of the mouth of the Nottaway River;
- 34.0 kilometres (21.1 mi) Northwest of downtown of Matagami.

From its source in the township of Grasset, the river Pahunan flows on 48.5 kilometres (30.1 mi) according to the following segments:

- 4.4 kilometres (2.7 mi) North, to the southern limit of the township of Paramé;
- 2.1 kilometres (1.3 mi) northwesterly to the eastern limit of the township of La Forest;
- 16.5 kilometres (10.3 mi) northerly and forming a large curve westerly in the township of Forest and winding in marsh areas, to the limit of township De Paramé;
- 10.8 kilometres (6.7 mi) northeasterly, and winding up to the outlet of a lake (coming from the East);
- 9.6 kilometres (6.0 mi) to the North, to the West, up to the limit of the township;
- 5.1 kilometres (3.2 mi) to the North, snaking to its mouth.

The Pahunan River flows into a river bend on the South shore of the Kitchigama River. This confluence is located at:

- 111.4 kilometres (69.2 mi) southeasterly of the mouth of the Kitchigama River;
- 126 kilometres (78 mi) Southeast of the mouth of the Nottaway River (confluence with Rupert Bay);
- 53.5 kilometres (33.2 mi) Northwest of downtown Matagami;
- 24 kilometres (15 mi) Southwest of Soscumica Lake.

== Toponymy ==
The toponym "Pahunan River" was made official on December 5, 1968, at the Commission de toponymie du Québec, i.e. at the creation of this commission.

== See also ==
- James Bay
- Rupert Bay
- Nottaway River
- Kitchigama River
- List of rivers of Quebec
