= Ourse River =

Ourse French: “Rivière de l’Ourse”
- Watershed of Nottaway River

Location
- Country: Canada
- Province: Quebec
- Region: Eeyou Istchee Baie-James (municipality)

Physical characteristics
- Source: Forested creek
  - location: Eeyou Istchee Baie-James (municipality), Nord-du-Québec, Quebec
  - coordinates: 49°35′07″N 77°58′36″W
  - elevation: 317 m (1,040 ft)
- Mouth: Kitchigama River
  - location: Eeyou Istchee Baie-James (municipality), Nord-du-Québec, Quebec
  - coordinates: 49°38′04″N 77°55′44″W
  - elevation: 239 m (784 ft)
- Length: 10.1 km (6.3 mi)

The Ourse River (French: “Rivière de l’Ourse”) is a tributary of the Allard River, in Eeyou Istchee Baie-James (municipality), in the administrative region of Nord-du-Québec, in Canadian province of Quebec, in Canada. The course of this river flows in the cantons of Vezza and Cavelier.

This hydrographic slope is served on the South side by Route 109 (East-West direction). The surface of the river is usually frozen from early November to mid-May, however, safe ice circulation is generally from mid-November to mid-April.

== Geography ==
The main neighboring hydrographic slopes are:

- North side: Allard River, Gouault River;
- East side: Allard River, Véract Creek, Bell River;
- South side: Allard River, Dollard Creek;
- West side: Adam River, Harricana River, McClure Creek.

The "Ourse River" originates from a forest stream (elevation: 317 metres (1,040 ft)) located at:

- 6.3 kilometres (3.9 mi) South-West of the mouth of the "Ourse River";
- 31.7 kilometres (19.7 mi) South-West of downtown Matagami.

From its source in the canton of Vezza, the "Ourse river" flows on 10.1 kilometres (6.3 mi) according to the following segments:

- 0.2 kilometres (0.12 mi) North, to the southern limit of the Cavalier township;
- 3.1 kilometres (1.9 mi) North in Cavalier township, to a creek (coming from the West);
- 2.0 kilometres (1.2 mi) East, to a creek (coming from the South);
- 4.8 kilometres (3.0 mi) northeasterly to the mouth of the river.

The "Ourse River" flows on the southwestern shore of the Allard River. This confluence is located at:

- 26.8 kilometres (16.7 mi) South-West of the mouth of the Allard River (confluence with Matagami Lake);
- 198 kilometres (123 mi) Southeast of the mouth of the Nottaway River (confluence with Rupert Bay);
- 22.2 kilometres (13.8 mi) South of downtown Matagami;
- 24.8 kilometres (15.4 mi) South-West of Matagami Lake.

== Toponymy ==
The name "Rivière de l'Ourse" (in French) was made official on November 21, 1972 at the Commission de toponymie du Québec, at the creation of this commission

== See also ==
- James Bay
- Rupert Bay
- Nottaway River, a watercourse
- Lake Matagami, a body of water
- Allard River, a watercourse
- List of rivers of Quebec
