= Armand de Foucauld de Pontbriand =

Armand de Foucauld de Pontbriand (24 November 1751 – 2 September 1792) was a French Catholic prelate who served as vicar general of the Archdiocese of Arles and was one of the 191 Catholic Martyrs of September 1792, killed in the September Massacres during the French Revolution. He was beatified as a member of that group on 17 October 1926 by Pope Pius XI.

== Life ==
Armand de Foucauld de Pontbriand was born on 24 November 1751, at Château de Lascoux in Celles, Dordogne, the son of Henri de Foucauld (1712–1775), seigneur of Lascoux. and Sibylle Marie du Lau d'Allemans. He belonged to the Pontbriand branch of the Foucauld (Périgord) family; he was the great-great uncle of Charles de Foucauld (1858–1916).

He took religious orders and became canon of Meaux in 1774. In 1781, he was summoned by his first cousin (maternal), Monseigneur Jean Marie du Lau, the archbishop of Arles, to become vicar general. In 1787, he received the Abbey of Solignac, near Limoges as a benefice, being the last in the line of abbots there.

== Martyrdom ==
During the French Revolution, he refused to take the oath demanded by the Civil Constitution of the Clergy, and "swear to be faithful to the nation and to maintain liberty and equality or die defending it". Held with other "refractory priests" in Carmes Prison, an improvised prison inside the closed monastery of the Discalced Carmelite friars in central Paris, he was given a second chance to take the oath, and again refused. He was among the 191 clergy who were either bayoneted or impaled on pikes on the threshold of the monastery on 2 September 1792.

Foucauld de Pontbriant's remains, along with those of his fellow martyrs, are entombed in the cemetery of the former Carmelite monastery, 70 rue de Vaugirard, Paris.

== Bibliography ==
- (in French) Gérard Cholvy (editor), Un évêque dans la tourmente révolutionnaire, Jean-Marie du Lau, archevêque d'Arles, et ses compagnons martyrs, 1792–1992, colloque du IIe centenaire tenu à Arles les 2-4 octobre 1992, Montpellier, Université Paul Valéry, 1995.
