= Grasset =

Grasset may refer to:

== People ==
- André Grasset (1758-1792), Canadian-born French priest, martyr
- Bernard Grasset (publisher) (1881–1955), French founder of publishing house Éditions Grasset
- Bernard Grasset (politician) (born 1933), French politician, former High Commissioner of New Caledonia
- Claude Sosthène Grasset d'Orcet (1828–1900), French archaeologist and writer
- Dalixia Fernández Grasset (born 1977), Cuban beach volleyball player
- Eugène Grasset (1845–1917), Swiss decorative artist and creator of the Grasset typeface
- Jean-Jacques Grasset (c.1769–1839), French violinist
- Joseph Grasset (1849–1918), French neurologist and parapsychological investigator
- Macarena Perez Grasset (born 1996), Chilean BMX cyclist
- Nicole Grasset (1927–2009), Swiss-French medical virologist and microbiologist-epidemiologist
- Raymond Grasset (1892-1968), French politician

== Toponyms ==
- Grasset Lake, Quebec, Canada

== Other ==
- Collège André-Grasset, pre-university college in Montreal, Quebec, Canada
- Éditions Grasset, French publishing house founded in 1907 by Bernard Grasset
- Grasset typeface, created by the French type foundry G. Peignot et Fils
