= Jean Marie du Lau =

French Catholic prelate

Jean Marie du Lau d'Allemans
- Archbishop of Arles
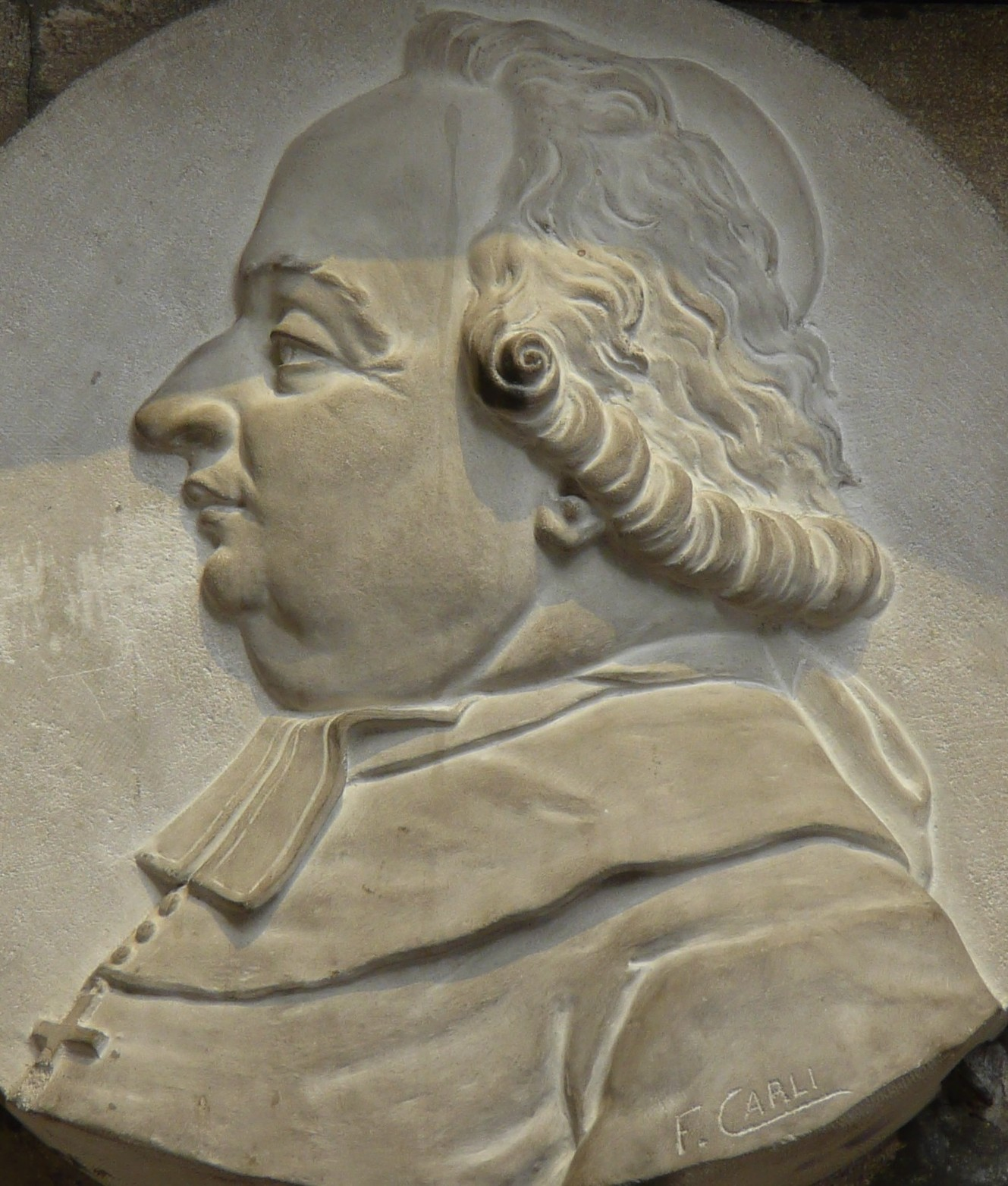
- A bas-relief in marble of Jean-Marie du Lau by François Carli in the Church of St. Trophime, Arles, which had served as his cathedral
- Church: Catholic Church
- Archdiocese: Archdiocese of Arles
- In office: 24 April 1775 – 2 September 1792
- Predecessor: Jean-Joseph de Jumilhac
- Successor: Jean-Claude Leblanc de Beaulieu

Orders
- Consecration: 1 October 1775 by Jean-François de Montillet de Grenaud

Personal details
- Born: 30 October 1738 Biras, Périgord, Guyenne, Kingdom of France
- Died: 2 September 1792 (aged 53) Paris, French Republic

Sainthood
- Beatified: 17 October 1926 by Pope Pius XI

Jean-Marie du Lau (30 October 1738, Biras – 2 September 1792, Paris) was a French Catholic prelate who served as the last Archbishop of Arles. He was one of the Catholic Martyrs of September 1792, killed in the September Massacres during the French Revolution. He was beatified on 17 October 1926 by Pope Pius XI.

== Early life ==
Lau was born on 30 October 1738 at the Château de la Côte at Biras, then in the Province of Perigord, of an aristocratic family which had provided many members to the higher ranks of the clergy. His father was Armand du Lau, Lord of La Coste, and his mother Françoise de Salleton.

== Churchman ==
After studies at the Collège de Navarre, Lau gained a Licentiate of Theology at the Sorbonne and then embarked on his ecclesiastical career, aided by his uncle, the Abbé Jean-Marie du Lau, parish priest of the Church of Saint-Sulpice in Paris since 1750. As was the system, he passed from one diocese to another in a rising curve of authority and prestige: canon and treasurer at Pamiers, Vicar General of the Diocese of Bordeaux, Prior of Gabillon and in 1770 attained the notable rank of Agent General of the Clergy of France. On 1 October 1775, he was promoted by King Louis XVI to the office of Archbishop of Arles, the youngest of the king's episcopal appointments.

== Archbishop of Arles ==
Starting in 1777, du Lau embarked on a pastoral visitation of the diocese and, in 1779, he had a report on the state of the diocese drawn up by the Abbé Laurent Bonnemant with a view to introducing reforms. Like that of many reforming bishops, the archbishop's interest extended to the preparation of midwives and catechism of children. He also undertook building works, such as the imposing facade of the archbishop's palace, which he had rebuilt in 1786.

With the convocation of the Estates-General of 1789, du Lau was chosen as one of the representatives of the clergy. As the revolutionary situation developed, the archbishop began a bitter conflict with the newly elected mayor of Arles, Pierre-Antoine Antonelle, an aristocrat who had sided with radical wing of the Revolution.

The conflict was short-lived for, on 12 July 1790, the National Assembly voted for measures that included the abolition of the Archdiocese of Arles. Jean-Marie du Lau was in fact the last Archbishop of Arles.

== Execution ==
Du Lau died a violent death on 2 September 1792 in an improvised prison inside the closed priory of the Carmelite Friars in central Paris, where he was being held with two priests of his archdiocese, Armand de Foucauld de Pontbriand and Pierre François Pazery de Thorame, and a large number of other clergy and religious. Those killed included two other bishops, Francois-Joseph de la Rochefoucauld and Pierre-Louis de la Rochefoucauld, priests, clerics and Brothers of the Christian Schools, for a total of 94 men. They were beatified as a group by Pope Pius XI.

Du Lau's remains, along with those of his fellow victims, are entombed in the cemetery of the former Carmelite priory, 70 rue de Vaugirard, Paris.

== See also ==
- September Massacres

== Sources ==
- Albanès, Joseph Hyacinthe; Chevalier, Ulysse (1901), Gallia christiana novissima, (in Latin), Vol. 3 (Valence: Montbeliard, 1901, pp. 1027-1036.
- Cholvy, Gérard (ed.), Jean Marie du Lau, archevêque d'Arles, et ses compagnons martyrs, 1792–1992 - Colloque du IIe centenaire tenu à Arles les 2-4 octobre 1992, Université Paul Valéry, Montpellier, 1995.
- Constant, Jacques (1816), Oeuvres de Monseigneur Jean-Marie Du Lau, Archevêque d'Arles, (in French)' Volume 1, Arles, G. Mesnier, 1816, [pp. 1-86].
- Fisquet, Honoré (1867). La France pontificale (Gallia christiana) : Arles, Embrun (in French). Vol. 2 (2nd ed.). Paris: E. Repos..
- Pécout, Ph. (1892), Jean-Marie Du Lau: archevêque d'Arles né en Périgord, (in French), Arles, Imprimerie Cassard, 1892.
- Ritzler, Remigius; Sefrin, Pirminus (1958), Hierarchia catholica (in Latin). Vol. VI (Padua: Messagero di S. Antonio 1958), [p. 97 with note 4].
