= Gouault River =

Gouault
- Watershed of Nottaway River

Location
- Country: Canada
- Province: Quebec
- Region: Eeyou Istchee Baie-James (municipality)

Physical characteristics
- Source: Marsh area
  - location: Eeyou Istchee Baie-James (municipality), Nord-du-Québec, Quebec
  - coordinates: 49°47′06″N 78°09′14″W
  - elevation: 282 m (925 ft)
- Mouth: Matagami Lake
  - location: Eeyou Istchee Baie-James (municipality), Nord-du-Québec, Quebec
  - coordinates: 49°53′52″N 77°45′50″W
  - elevation: 260 m (850 ft)
- Length: 18.5 km (11.5 mi)

The Gouault River is a tributary of the west shore of Matagami Lake which empties into the Nottaway River via Soscumica Lake. The Gouault River flows in the municipality of Eeyou Istchee Baie-James (municipality), in the administrative region of Nord-du-Québec, Quebec, the Canada.

The R1027 bridge spans the Gouault River about 11 kilometres (6.8 mi) south of its confluence with Matagami Lake. From the bridge, this road runs along the west bank of the Gouault River and the Matagami Lake; then it goes further north to reach the territories east of James Bay.

The Gouault River flows entirely in forest and marsh areas, southwest of Matagami Lake. The surface of the river is usually frozen from the beginning of December to the end of April.

== Geography ==
The hydrographic slopes near the Gouault River are:

- north side: Bouchier Lake, Soscumica Lake, Deux-Lacs River, Natchiowatchouan River, Nottaway River;
- east side: Matagami Lake, Allard River, Bell River;
- south side: Allard River, River of the Bear, Adam River, Harricana River;
- west side: Grasset Lake, Samson River, Adam River, Harricana River, Kitchigama River.

The upper part of the river (upstream of MacIvor Lake) drains a large swamp area between Grasset Lake and Matagami Lake.

From its source (crossing of two brook streams), the Gouault River flows over 18.5 kilometres (11.5 mi) according to the following segments:

- 8.1 kilometres (5.0 mi) northeasterly by collecting the waters of two creeks on the right and two creeks on the left, to the west bank of MacIvor Lake;
- 1.7 kilometres (1.1 mi) easterly crossing MacIvor Lake (length: 2.4 kilometres (1.5 mi); altitude: 257 metres (843 ft));
- 1.8 kilometres (1.1 mi) northeasterly to the outlet of Wabassi Lake (from the south);
- 6.9 kilometres (4.3 mi) northeasterly to the west shore of Matagami Lake.

The mouth of the Gouault River is located at:

- 18.0 kilometres (11.2 mi) north-west of downtown Matagami;
- 161 kilometres (100 mi) south-east of the confluence of the Nottaway River with Rupert Bay (connected to James Bay);
- 108 kilometres (67 mi) north-west of Lebel-sur-Quévillon;
- 126.6 kilometres (78.7 mi) east of the Ontario border.

== Toponymy ==
In 1936, the federal topographic map entitled Waswanipi indicated the hydronym "MacIvor River" for this river. The following year, the Geographical Survey of Quebec formalizes this hydronym under "MacIvor River". The MacIvor designation, provided by the geologist Jérôme H. Rémick, evokes the life of a trapper who frequent this region. The name "MacIvor River" would be associated with the name of Mount MacIvor located 3 km southwest of the lake of the same name. The Algonquin, for their part, call the Nedawaka River, meaning the river to fetch what to live.

Finally, in 1965, the Quebec Geography Commission officially adopted the "Rivière Gouault" toponym. The term Gouault is a family name of French origin. At that time, it was common to name or rename places in northern Quebec after characters from New France. It is not unreasonable to believe that this hydronym evokes the Jesuit and apothecary brother Gaspard Gouault, who practiced his profession in New France in the 17th century.

The toponym "Gouault river" was formalized on December 5, 1968, at the Commission de toponymie du Québec.

== See also ==
- James Bay
- Rupert Bay
- Nottaway River
- Lake Matagami
- Baie-James#Eeyou Istchee Baie-James (municipality), a municipality
- James Bay
- Nunavik
- List of rivers of Quebec
