= Fabulet River =

Fabulet
- Watershed of Nottaway River

Location
- Country: Canada
- Province: Quebec
- Region: Eeyou Istchee Baie-James (municipality)

Physical characteristics
- Source: Unidentified lake
  - location: Eeyou Istchee Baie-James (municipality), Nord-du-Québec, Quebec
  - coordinates: 50°47′27″N 78°08′44″W
  - elevation: 218 m (715 ft)
- Mouth: Iroquois River (Nottaway River)
  - location: Eeyou Istchee Baie-James (municipality), Nord-du-Québec, Quebec
  - coordinates: 50°53′03″N 78°22′03″W
  - elevation: 142 m (466 ft)
- Length: 26.9 km (16.7 mi)

The Fabulet River is a tributary of the Iroquois River (Nottaway River) in the administrative region of Nord-du-Québec, in the Canadian province of Quebec, in Canada.

This hydrographic slope does not have forest access roads. The surface of the river is usually frozen from early November to mid-May. However, safe ice circulation is generally from mid-November to mid-April.

== Geography ==
The main neighboring hydrographic slopes are:

- North side: Richerville River, Nottaway River;
- East side: Richerville River, Nottaway River;
- South side: Kitchigama River, Iroquois River (Nottaway River);
- West side: Kitchigama River, Iroquois River (Nottaway River).

The Fabulet River originates from an unidentified lake (length: 1.2 kilometres (0.75 mi); altitude: 218 metres (715 ft)) located at:

- 6.5 kilometres (4.0 mi) Southwest of the Nottaway River;
- 18.7 kilometres (11.6 mi) Southeast of the mouth of the Fabulet River;
- 27.3 kilometres (17.0 mi) Southeast of the mouth of the Iroquois River (Nottaway River);
- 78.3 kilometres (48.7 mi) South of the mouth of the Nottaway River;
- 120 kilometres (75 mi) South of downtown Matagami

From its source in the Township of Desmazures, the Fabulet River flows over 26.9 kilometres (16.7 mi) according to the following segments:

- 1.7 kilometres (1.1 mi) southerly and westward across an unidentified lake (elevation: 214 metres (702 ft) to its mouth;
- 10.3 kilometres (6.4 mi) northwesterly to the South shore of Fabulet Lake;
- 2.2 kilometres (1.4 mi) northwesterly across Lake Fabulet (elevation: 176 metres (577 ft)) on its full length;
- 5.2 kilometres (3.2 mi) northwesterly, then southwesterly, to a stream (from the Southeast);
- 7.5 kilometres (4.7 mi) northwesterly by collecting several streams to its mouth.

The Fabulet River flows into a river bend on the eastern shore of the Iroquois River (Nottaway River). This confluence is located at:

- 8.8 kilometres (5.5 mi) Southeast of the mouth of the Iroquois River (Nottaway River);
- 60.2 kilometres (37.4 mi) Southeast of the mouth of the Nottaway River (confluence with Rupert Bay);
- 135 kilometres (84 mi) Northwest of downtown Matagami;
- 6.0 kilometres (3.7 mi) South of the Nottaway River.

== Toponymy ==
The term "Fabulet" is a family name of French origin.

The toponym "Fabulet River" was formalized on December 5, 1968, at the Commission de toponymie du Québec, i.e. at the creation of this commission

== See also ==
- James Bay
- Rupert Bay
- Nottaway River
- Iroquois River (Nottaway River)
- List of rivers of Quebec
