= Rivière des Renards =

River in Estrie, Quebec (Canada)

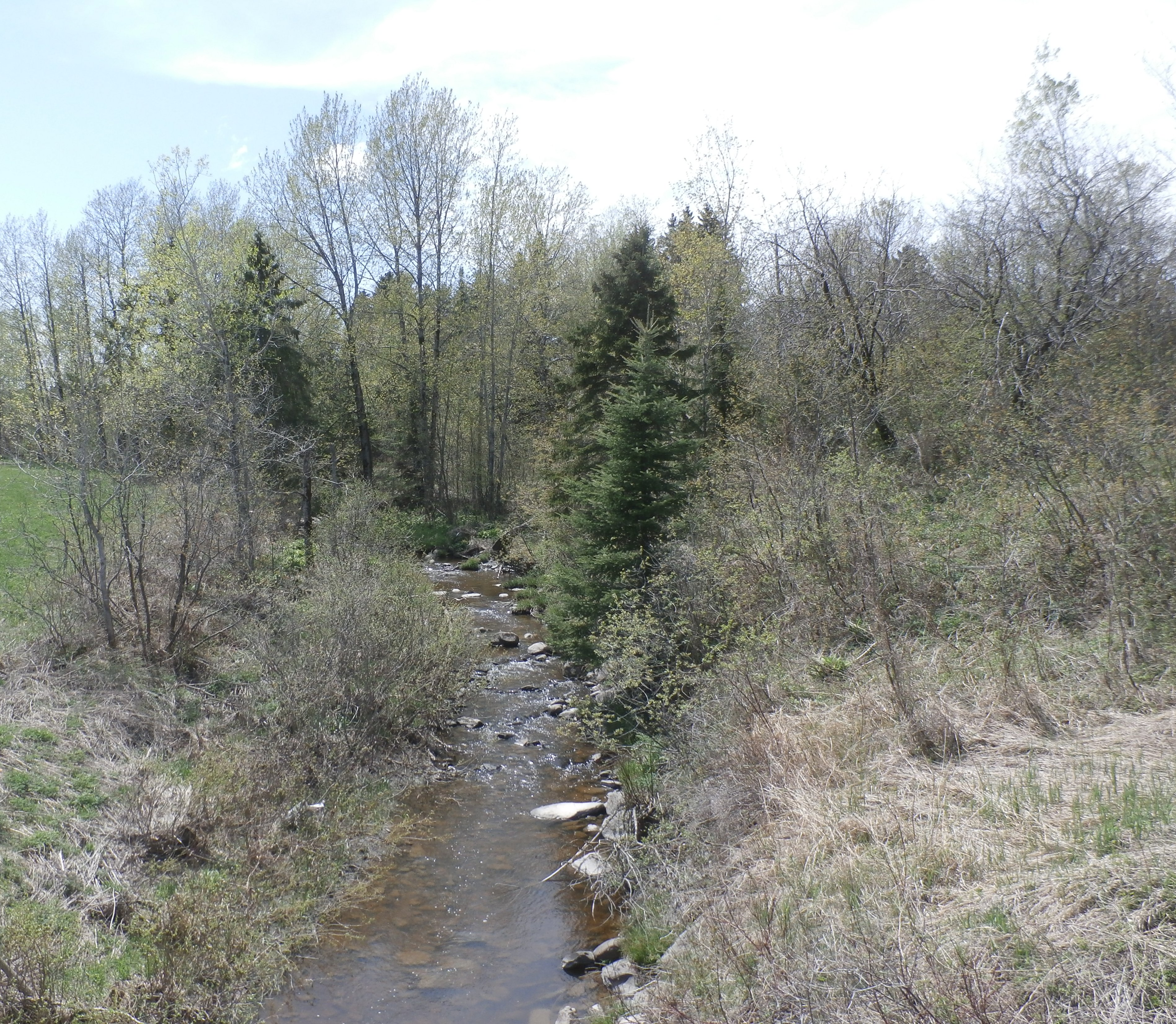
- Rivière des Renards upstream of the rang 6 and 7 bridge in St-Ludger.

- Location within Quebec

Location
- Country: Canada
- Province: Quebec
- Region: Estrie
- MRC: Le Granit Regional County Municipality

Physical characteristics
- Source: Mountain streams
  - location: Saint-Ludger, (MRC) Le Granit Regional County Municipality, Québec
  - coordinates: 45.612464°N 70.628416°W
  - elevation: 601 metres (1,972 ft)
- Mouth: Rivière du Barrage
  - location: Saint-Ludger
  - coordinates: 45.68028°N 70.67555°W
  - elevation: 397 metres (1,302 ft)
- Length: 7.8 kilometres (4.8 mi)

Basin features
- Progression: Rivière du Barrage, Samson River, Chaudière River, St. Lawrence River
- River system: St. Lawrence River
- Tributaries
  - left: (upstream)
  - right: (upstream)

The rivière des Renards (in English: river of foxes) is a tributary of the south bank of the rivière du Barrage which flows on the south bank of the Samson River.

== Toponymy ==
The toponym "rivière des Renards" was made official on February 28, 1980, at the Commission de toponymie du Québec.

== See also ==
- List of rivers of Quebec
