= Grasset Lake =

Head lake of the Kitchigama River, Quebec, Canada

Lake Grasset
- Nottaway River basin in yellow

- Location within Quebec
- Location: Baie-James, near Matagami, Quebec
- Coordinates: 49°56′33″N 78°09′43″W
- Type: Natural
- Primary inflows: Subercase River
- Primary outflows: Kitchigama River
- Basin countries: Canada
- Max. length: 15 kilometres (9.3 mi)
- Max. width: 9 kilometres (5.6 mi)
- Surface area: 89 square kilometres (34 sq mi)
- Surface elevation: 250 metres (820 ft)
- Islands: 0

Grasset Lake is a freshwater body of the southern part of Eeyou Istchee James Bay (municipality), in the administrative region of Nord-du-Québec, in the province of Quebec, in Canada. This lake covers almost the entire canton of Grasset in addition to extending westward in the canton of Subercase.

Forestry is the main economic activity of the sector. Recreational tourism activities come second.

This hydrographic slope has no access forest road. The surface of Grasset Lake is usually frozen from early November to mid-May, however safe ice movement is generally from mid-November to mid-April.

== Geography ==
Covering 89 kilometres (55.30 mi), this lake in the form of an olive has a length of 15 kilometres (9.3 mi), a maximum width of 9 kilometres (5.6 mi) and an altitude of 250 metres (820 ft). Grasset Lake is mainly fed by the Subercase River (coming from the Southwest). It is the largest body of water supplying the Kitchigama River.

The mouth of Lac Grasset is located on the North shore at:

- 28.5 kilometres (17.7 mi) West of Matagami Lake;
- 45.9 kilometres (28.5 mi) Northwest of downtown Matagami;
- 96.9 kilometres (60.2 mi) East of the Quebec - Ontario border;
- 126.8 kilometres (78.8 mi) Southeast of the mouth of the Kitchigama River (confluence with the Nottaway River.

The main hydrographic slopes near Grasset Lake are:

- North side: Kitchigama River, Paul-Sauvé Lake;
- East side: Matagami Lake, Nottaway River, Bell River;
- South side: Subercase River, Bell River, Harricana River, Samson River;
- West side: Samson River, Harricana River.

== Toponymy ==
The Algonquins designate this body of water "Apicigamijici", meaning "round lake without islands"; which reflects the characteristics of the lake.

This toponym evokes the work of life of André Grasset (Montreal, 1758 - Paris, 1792). From the age of six, in 1764, he accompanied his father to Calais, France. At the end of his classical studies at Collège Sainte-Barbe, a Parisian school founded in 1460, André Grasset turned to the priesthood. Sulpician, he was ordained a priest at Sens, in 1783.

At the time of his graduation, the country was experiencing an economic and social crisis that left the monarchy and its people in great indifference. And the people of France were entering a crucial period in their history, the "French Revolution", which began in 1789.

Busy in this societal transformation, members of the clergy must subscribe to the civil constitution by which the clergy whose bishops and priests no longer receive the investiture of the pope; they become public servants. During a trial, in the face of what appears to him as a renunciation of his most fundamental beliefs, André Grasset refuses to take this oath. He will be assassinated, as will all the priests and bishops imprisoned in the former Carmelite monastery in Paris in 1792.

The French Revolution, one of the darkest periods of which began under the reign of terror, made its first martyr in Quebec. More than a century after his death, André Grasset was beatified. He became the first Canadian born on the altars on October 17, 1926.

The name "Lac Grasset" was officialized on December 5, 1968 by the Commission de toponymie du Québec when it was created.

== See also ==
- James Bay
- Rupert Bay
- Nottaway River, a watercourse
- Kitchigama River, a watercourse
- Subercase River, a course
