= Rivière du Barrage =

River in Estrie, Quebec, Canada

- Location within Quebec

Location
- Country: Canada
- Province: Quebec
- Region: Estrie
- MRC: Le Granit Regional County Municipality

Physical characteristics
- Source: Mountain streams
  - location: Saint-Robert-Bellarmin, (MRC) Le Granit Regional County Municipality, Québec
  - coordinates: 45.631162°N 70.601786°W
  - elevation: 566 metres (1,857 ft)
- Mouth: Samson River
  - location: Saint-Ludger
  - coordinates: 45.68278°N 70.67917°W
  - elevation: 392 metres (1,286 ft)
- Length: 8.2 kilometres (5.1 mi)

Basin features
- Progression: Samson River, Chaudière River, St. Lawrence River
- River system: St. Lawrence River
- Tributaries
  - left: (upstream) Rivière des Renards
  - right: (upstream)

The rivière du Barrage (in English: river of the Dam) is a tributary of the east bank of the Samson River, which flows on the east bank of the Chaudière River; the latter flows northward to empty onto the south shore of the St. Lawrence River.

== Toponymy ==
The toponym Rivière du Barrage was formalized on December 5, 1968, at the Commission de toponymie du Québec.

== See also ==
- List of rivers of Quebec
