= Holy September Martyrs =

1792 martyrs of the French Revolution

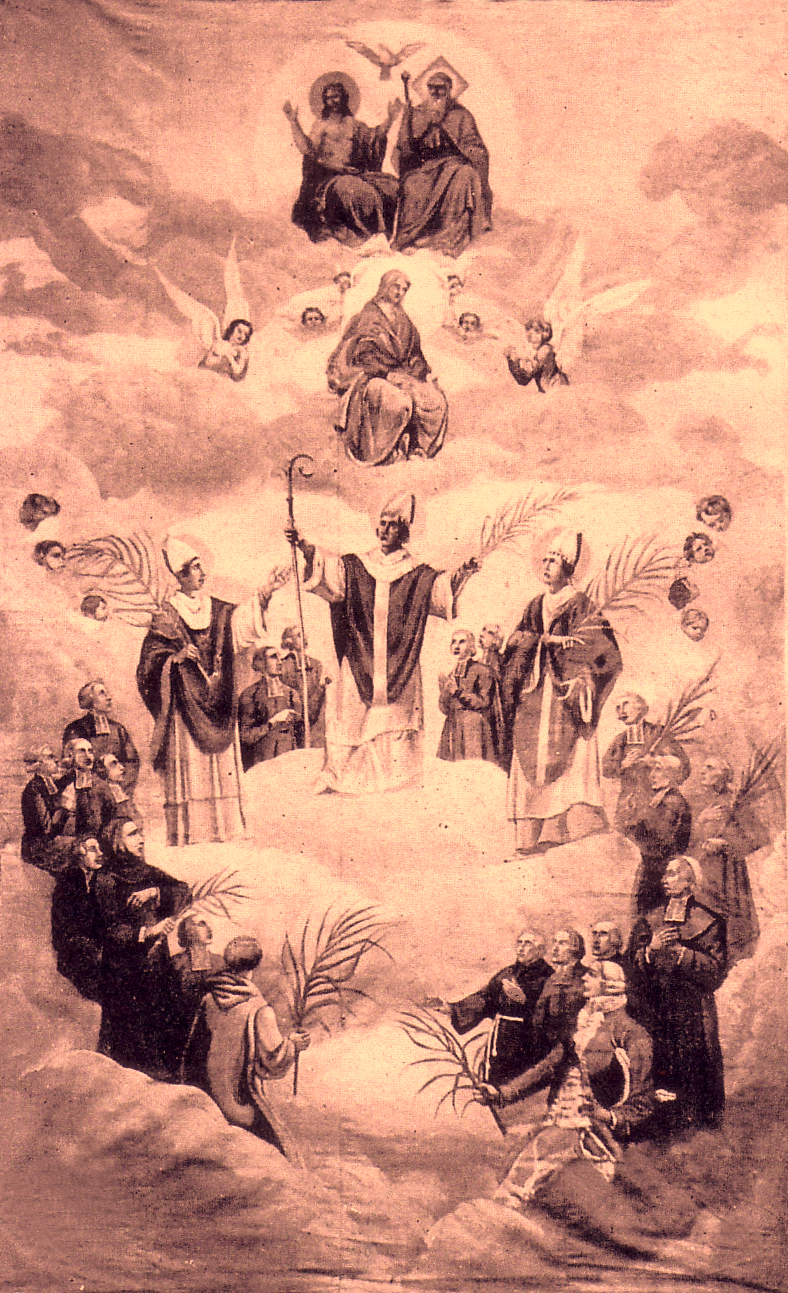
Image used for the beatification ceremony

The Holy September Martyrs (French: Saints Martyrs de Septembre), also referred to as the Blessed Martyrs of Carmes (Bienheureux Martyrs des Carmes), is the term sometimes used for 191 Catholics killed at the Carmes Prison in Paris in the September Massacres of 1792 during the French Revolution.

== History ==
After they refused to take the oath in support of the civil constitution of the clergy, they were imprisoned in a Carmelite convent. On September 2 and 3, 1792 they were massacred by revolutionary mobs.

The victims included: Bishop of Saintes Pierre-Louis de La Rochefoucauld, his brother François-Joseph de la Rochefoucauld, Bishop of Beauvais, and John du Lau, Archbishop of Arles. In addition, 127 secular priests, 5 deacons, 56 men and women belonging to various religious orders, as well as 5 laypeople were killed. Eighty-six of the priests and four of the laity belonged to the Diocese of Paris.

"John du Lau and Companions" were beatified by Pope Pius XI 134 years later in October 1926, and are commemorated on 2 September in the Roman Martyrology. and in local calendars. One of the martyrs, Solomon Leclercq, a Brother of the Christian Schools, was canonized by Pope Francis in 2016.

== List of martyrs ==
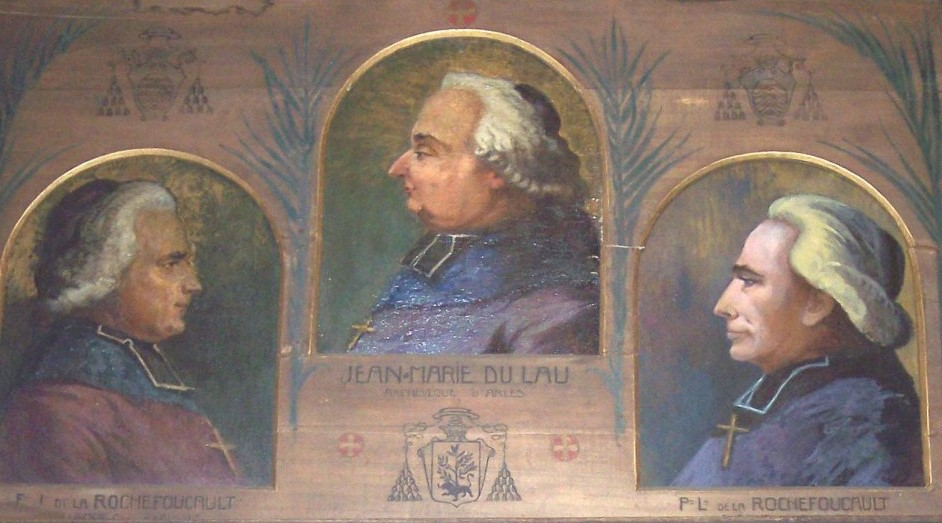
Blesseds Pierre-Louis de la Rochefoucauld-Bayers (left), Jean-Marie du Lau D’Alleman (center), and François-Joseph de la Rochefoucauld-Maumont (right)

Archbishops

1. Jean-Marie du Lau D’Alleman, Archbishop of Arles (30 October 1738 – 2 September 1792)

Bishops

1. Pierre-Louis de la Rochefoucauld-Bayers, Bishop of Saintes (12 October 1744 – 2 September 1792)
2. François-Joseph de la Rochefoucauld-Maumont, Bishop of Beauvais (28 April 1736 – 2 September 1792)

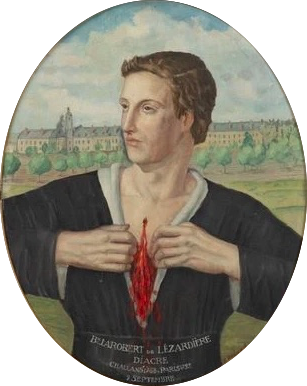
Blessed Jacques-Augustin Robert de Lézardière, one of five deacons martyred during the Revolution.

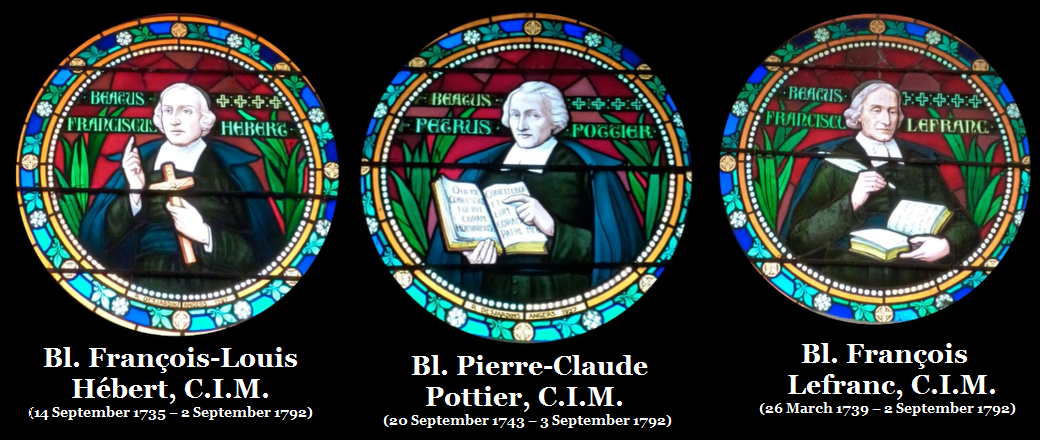
Blessed Martyrs of the Congregation of Jesus and Mary (Eudist order)

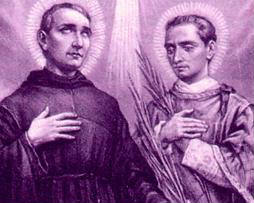
Blesseds Charles (left, Minim) and Louis-Benjamin Hurtrel (right, Deacon)

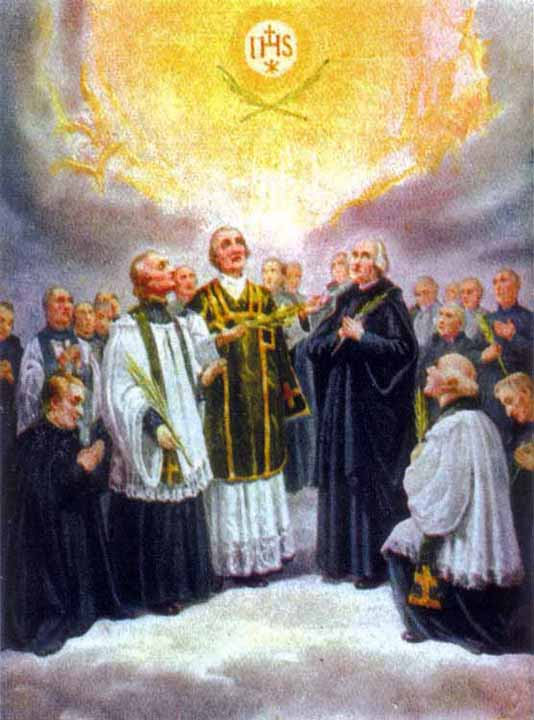
Portrait of the twenty-four Jesuits martyred during the French Revolution

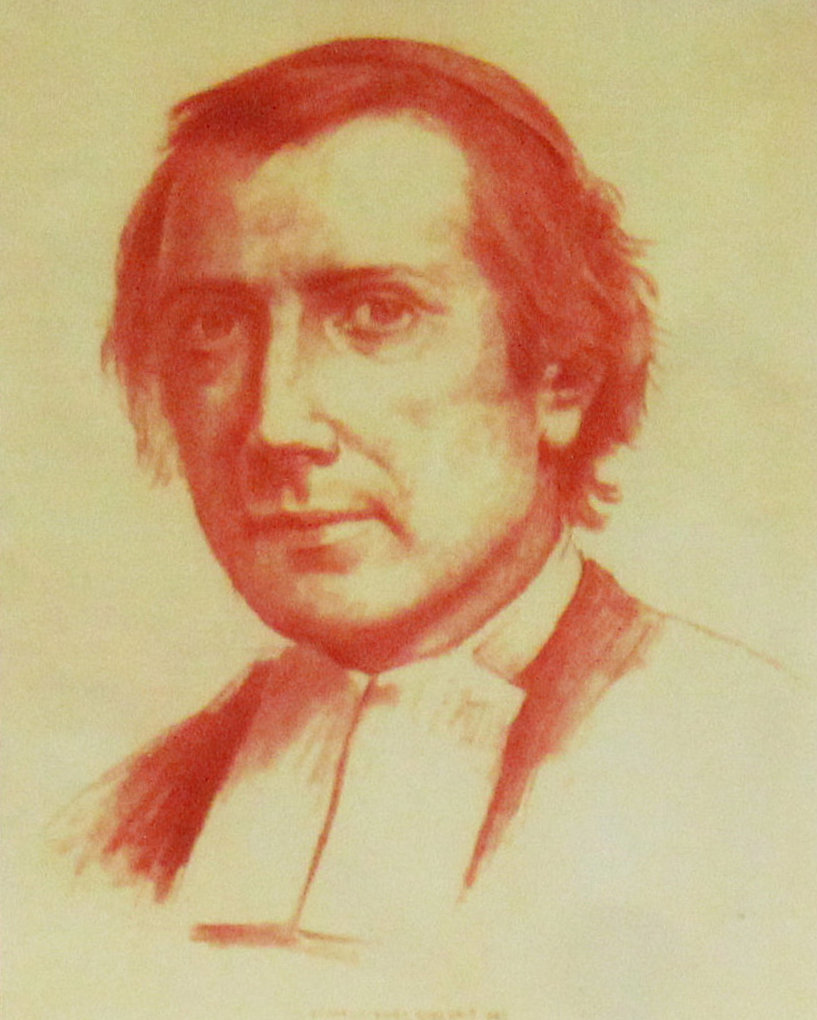
Salomon Leclercq, from the Brothers of the Christian Schools (De La Salle Brothers), the first French Revolution martyr to be canonized (2016).

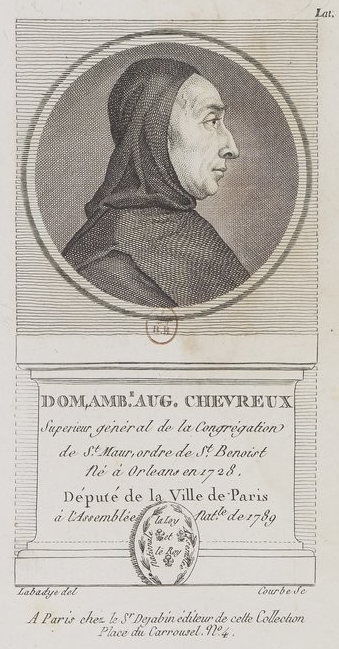
Blessed Ambroise-Augustin Chevreux, Benedictine monk martyred during the French Revolution. From the Bibliothèque nationale de France, département Estampes et photographie.

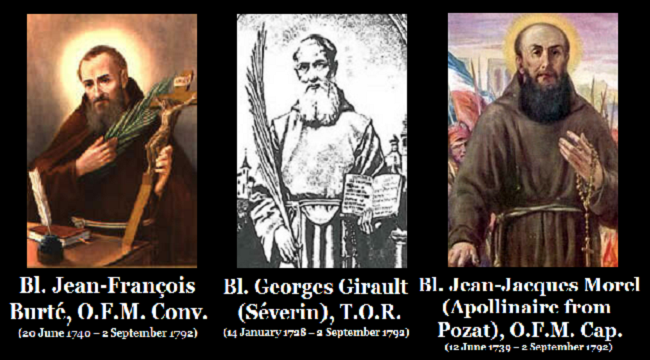
Three martyred Franciscans from different branches recognized.

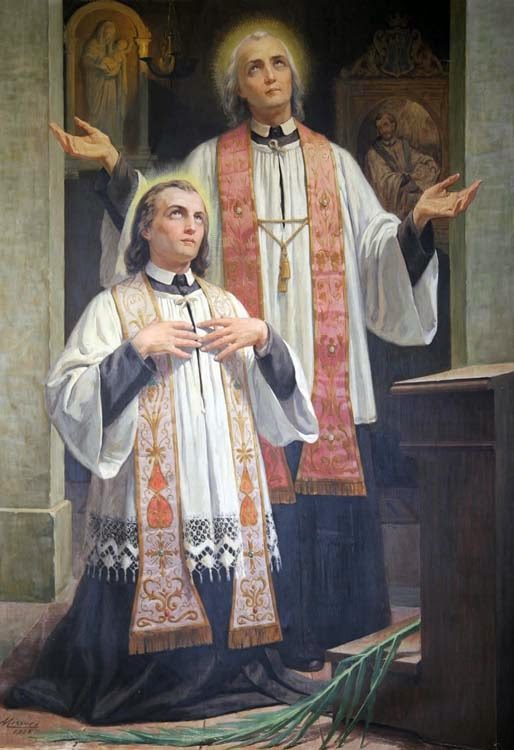
Blesseds Claude Bochot and Eustache Félix, priests from the Congregation of Christian Doctrine (Christian Doctrine Fathers).

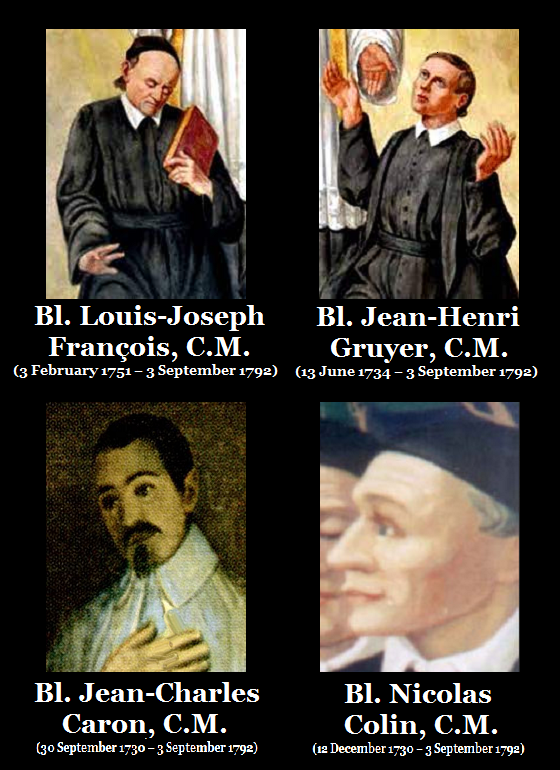
Blessed Vincentian Martyrs of the French Revolution

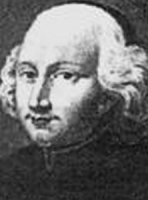
Blessed Anne-Alexandre-Charles-Marie Lanfant, a Jesuit priest who served for two years as confessor to King Louis XVI.

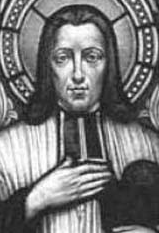
Blessed Andre Grasset, the only Canadian priest martyred during the French Revolution.

Diocesan Clergy

1. Daniel-Louis André Des Pommerayes (2 July 1756 – 2 September 1792)
2. Louis-Remi (or René) Benoist (c. 1755 – 2 September 1792)
3. Louis-Remi-Nicolas Benoist (c. 1742 – 2 September 1792)
4. Antoine-Charles-Octavien du Bouzet (6 March 1739 – 2 September 1792)
5. Jean-André Capeau (died 2 September 1792)
6. Armand-Anne-Auguste-Antonin-Sicaire Chapt de Rastignac (1 October 1727 – 2 September 1792)
7. Claude Fontaine (c. 1749 – 2 September 1792)
8. Pierre-Louis Gervais (c. 1753 – 2 September 1792)
9. Saintin Huré (c. 1765 – 2 September 1792)
10. “Laurent” (died 2 September 1792)
11. Louis le Danois (c. 1744 – 2 September 1792)
12. Thomas-Jean Montsaint (18 December 1725 – 2 September 1792)
13. François-Joseph Pey (c. 1759 – 2 September 1792)
14. Jean-Joseph Rateau (18 November 1758 – 2 September 1792)
15. Marc-Louis Royer (c. 1720 – 2 September 1792)
16. Jean-Louis Guyard De Saint-Clair (c. 1734 – 2 September 1792)
17. Jean-Pierre Simon (died 2 September 1792)
18. Pierre-Jacques-Marie Vitalis (c. 1759 – 2 September 1792)
19. Vincent Abraham (15 June 1740 – 2 September 1792)
20. Andé Angar (c. 1759 – 2 September 1792)
21. Jean-Baptiste-Claude Aubert (19 March 1768 – 2 September 1792)
22. Jean-Pierre Bangue (12 February 1744 – 2 September 1792)
23. Louis-François-André Barret (23 September 1758 – 2 September 1792)
24. Joseph Bécavin (6 February 1767 – 2 September 1792)
25. Jean-Antoine-Hyacinthe Boucharenc de Chaumeils (7 June 1738 – 2 September 1792)
26. Jean-François Bousquet (8 January 1751 – 2 September 1792)
27. Claude Chaudet (died 2 September 1792)
28. Nicolas Clairet [Cléret] (1726 – 2 September 1792)
29. Claude Colin (15 February 1728 – 2 September 1792)
30. François Dardan (13 June 1733 – 2 September 1792)
31. Mathurin-Victoir Deruelle (18 September 1729 – 2 September 1792)
32. Gabriel Desprez de Roche (c. 1751 – 2 September 1792)
33. Thomas-René Dubuisson (6 July 1737 – 2 September 1792)
34. François Dumasrambaud de Calandelle (18 October 1754 – 2 September 1792)
35. Henri-Hippolyte Ermès (c. 1752 – 2 September 1792)
36. Armand de Foucauld de Pontbriand (24 November 1751 – 2 September 1792)
37. Louis-Laurent Gaultier (13 March 1717 – 2 September 1792)
38. Jean Goizet (29 May 1742 – 2 September 1792)
39. André Grasset de Saint-Sauveur (5 April 1758 – 2 September 1792)
40. Jean-Antoine Guilleminet (4 January 1738 – 2 September 1792)
41. Jean-Baptiste Jannin (c. 1754 – 2 September 1792)
42. Jean Lacan (died 2 September 1792)
43. Pierre Landry (c. 1762 – 2 September 1792)
44. Robert le Bis (c. 1719 – 2 September 1792)
45. Olivier Lefebvre (c. 1728 – 2 September 1792)
46. Jacques-Joseph le Jardinier Deslandes (1750 – 2 September 1792)
47. Jacques-Jean Lemeunier (c. 1747 – 2 September 1792)
48. François-César Londiveau (11 June 1764 – 2 September 1792)
49. Louis Longuet (24 February 1757 – 2 September 1792)
50. Jacques-François de Lubersac (c. 1729 – 2 September 1792)
51. Gaspard-Claude Maignien (c. October 1752 – 2 September 1792)
52. Jean-Philippe Marchand (22 August 1764 – 2 September 1792)
53. Louis Mauduit (31 December 1763 – 2 September 1792)
54. François-Louis Méallet de Fargues (7 July 1764 – 2 September 1792)
55. Jacques-Alexandre Menuret (2 April 1734 – 2 September 1792)
56. Jean-Baptiste Nativelle (25 September 1749 – 2 September 1792)
57. René Nativelle (28 January 1751 – 2 September 1792)
58. Antoine-Mathieu-Augustin Nogier (25 February 1764 – 2 September 1792)
59. Joseph-Thomas Pazery de Thorame (18 April 1751 – 2 September 1792)
60. Jules-Honoré-Cyprien Pazery de Thorame (September 1763 – 2 September 1792)
61. Pierre-François Pazery de Thorames (c. 1735 – 2 September 1792)
62. Pierre Ploquin (12 December 1762 – 2 September 1792)
63. René-Nicolas Poret (11 January 1732 – 2 September 1792)
64. Julien Poulain Delaunay (4 March 1744 – 2 September 1792)
65. Jean-Robert Quéneau (9 April 1758 – 2 September 1792)
66. François-Urbain Salins de Niart (23 May 1760 – 2 September 1792)
67. Jean-Henri-Louis-Michel Samson (25 August 1754 – 2 September 1792)
68. Jean-Antoine-Barnabé Séguin (c. 1754 – 2 September 1792)
69. Pierre-Louis-Joseph Verrier (28 December 1728 – 2 September 1792)
70. Jean-Baptiste Bottex (26 December 1749 – 3 September 1792)
71. André-Abel Alricy (2 August 1712 – 3 September 1792)
72. Pierre-Paul Balzac (25 April 1750 – 3 September 1792)
73. Michel-André-Sylvestre Binard (28 November 1742 – 3 September 1792)
74. Nicolas Bize (5 October 1737 – 3 September 1792)
75. Pierre Bonzé (c. June 1719 – 3 September 1792)
76. Pierre Brisquet (25 February 1742 – 3 September 1792)
77. Pierre Brisse (3 August 1733 – 3 September 1792)
78. Charles Carnus (30 May 1749 – 3 September 1792)
79. Bertrand-Antoine de Caupenne (1753 – 3 September 1792)
80. Jacques Dufour (9 April 1765 – 3 September 1792)
81. Denis-Claude Duval (c. 1739 – 3 September 1792)
82. Jean-Pierre Duval (c. 1740 – 3 September 1792)
83. Joseph Falcoz (4 December 1726 – 3 September 1792)
84. Gilbert-Jean Fautrel (19 April 1730 – 3 September 1792)
85. Philibert Fougères (1742 – 3 September 1792)
86. Pierre-Jean Garrigues (2 March 1725 – 3 September 1792)
87. Nicolas Gaudreau (c. 1744 – 3 September 1792)
88. Étienne-Michel Gillet (c. 1758 – 3 September 1792)
89. Georges-Jérôme Giroust (c. 1765 – 3 September 1792)
90. Joseph-Marie Gros (22 May 1742 – 3 September 1792)
91. Yves-André Guillon de Keranrun (8 March 1748 – 3 September 1792)
92. Julien-François Hédouin (3 October 1760 – 3 September 1792)
93. Pierre-François Hénocq (c. 1749 – 3 September 1792)
94. Pierre-Louis Joret (28 October 1761 – 3 September 1792)
95. Gilles-Louis-Symphorien Lanchon (c. 1754 – 3 September 1792)
96. Jacques de la Lande (8 March 1735 – 3 September 1792)
97. Louis-Jean-Mathieu Lanier (c. 1753 – 3 September 1792)
98. Jean-Joseph de Lavèze-Bellay (c. 1742 – 3 September 1792)
99. Michel Leber (c. 1731 – 3 September 1792)
100. Jean-Charles Legrand (c. 1745 – 3 September 1792)
101. Jean-Pierre le Laisant (c. 1753 – 3 September 1792)
102. Julien le Laisant (c. 1761 – 3 September 1792)
103. Jean Lemaître (c. 1767 – 3 September 1792)
104. Jean-Thomas Leroy (c. 1738 – 3 September 1792)
105. Martin-François-Alexis Loublier (c. 1733 – 3 September 1792)
106. Claude-Louis Marmotant de Savigny (27 March 1748 – 3 September 1792)
107. Claude-Silvain-Raphaël Mayneaud de Bizefranc (2 May 1750 – 3 September 1792)
108. Henri-Jean Milet (c. 1759 – 3 September 1792)
109. François-Joseph Monnier (18 March 1763 – 3 September 1792)
110. Marie-François Mouffle (23 August 1754 – 3 September 1792)
111. Joseph-Louis Oviefre (c. 1748 – 3 September 1792)
112. Jean-Michel Philippot (c. 1743 – 3 September 1792)
113. Jacques-Léonor Rabé (27 December 1750 – 3 September 1792)
114. Pierre-Robert Regnet (19 May 1755 – 3 September 1792)
115. Yves-Jean-Pierre Rey de Kervisic (c. April 1761 – 3 September 1792)
116. Nicolas-Claude Roussel (c. 1730 – 3 September 1792)
117. Pierre Saint-James (18 October 1742 – 3 September 1792)
118. Jacques-Louis Schmid (14 September 1752 – 3 September 1792)
119. Pierre-Jacques de Turmenyes (5 October 1744 – 3 September 1792)
120. René-Joseph Urvoy (c. 1766 – 3 September 1792)
121. Charles-Victor Véret (17 July 1763 – 3 September 1792)

Deacons

1. Louis-Benjamin Hurtrel (died 2 September 1792)
2. Louis-Alexis-Mathias Boubert (24 February 1766 – 2 September 1792)
3. Étienne-François-Dieudonné de Ravinel (6 July 1769 – 2 September 1792)
4. Jacques-Augustin Robert de Lézardières (27 November 1768 – 2 September 1792)
5. Pierre-Florent Leclercq [Clercq] (c. 1744 – 3 September 1792)

Seminarians

1. August-Dénis Nezel (28 September 1770 – 2 September 1792)

Roman Catholic Laity

1. Charles-Regis-Mathieu de la Calmette de Valfons (c. 1747 – 2 September 1792)
2. Sébastien Desbrielles (28 April 1739 – 3 September 1792)
3. Louis-François Rigot (18 October 1751 – 3 September 1792)
4. Jean-Antoine-Joseph de Villette (12 June 1731 – 3 September 1792)

Order of Minims

1. Charles-Louis Hurtrel, O.M. (c. 1760 – 2 September 1792)

Society of Jesus (Jesuits)

1. Anne-Alexandre-Charles-Marie Lanfant, S.J. (9 September 1726 – 2 September 1792)
2. François Balmain, S.J. (23 May 1733 – 2 September 1792)
3. Charles-Jéremie Bérauld du Pérou, S.J. (17 November 1737 – 2 September 1792)
4. Jacques-Jules Bonnaud, S.J. (27 October 1740 – 2 September 1792)
5. Claude Cayx-Dumas, S.J. (6 November 1724 – 2 September 1792)
6. Jean Charton De Millou, S.J. (7 September 1751 – 2 September 1792)
7. Guillaume-Antoine Delfaut, S.J. (5 April 1733 – 2 September 1792)
8. Jacques Friteyre-Durvé, S.J. (18 April 1725 – 2 September 1792)
9. Claude-François Gagnières des Granges, S.J. (23 May 1722 – 2 September 1792)
10. Claude-Antoine-Raoul Laporte, S.J. (6 December 1734 – 2 September 1792)
11. Mathurin-Nicolas de la Villecrohain Le Bous De Villeneuve, S.J. (19 December 1731 – 2 September 1792)
12. Charles-François le Gué, S.J. (6 October 1724 – 2 September 1792)
13. Vincent-Joseph le Rousseau de Rosencoat, S.J. (3 July 1726 – 2 September 1792)
14. Loup Thomas-Bonnotte, S.J. (19 October 1719 – 2 September 1792)
15. François Varheilhe-Duteil, S.J. (15 June 1734 – 2 September 1792)
16. Michel-François de Lagardette, S.J. (5 September 1744 – 3 September 1792)
17. François-Hyacinthe Lé Livec de Trésurin, S.J. (5 May 1726 – 3 September 1792)
18. René-Marie Andrieux, S. J. (16 February 1742 – 3 September 1792)
19. Jean-François-Marie Benoît-Vourlat, S.J. (26 March 1731 – 3 September 1792)
20. Pierre-Michel Guérin du Rocher, S.J. (c. 1731 – 3 September 1792)
21. Robert-François Guérin du Rocher, S.J. (23 October 1736 – 3 September 1792)
22. Éloy Herque du Roule, S.J. (31 May 1741 – 3 September 1792)
23. Jean-Antoine Seconds, S.J. (c. 1734 – 3 September 1792)
24. Nicolas-Marie Verron, S.J. (7 November 1754 – 3 September 1792)

Order of Saint Benedict (Benedictines)

1. Louis Barreau de la Touche, O.S.B. (6 June 1758 – 2 September 1792)
2. Ambroise-Augustin Chevreux, O.S.B. (13 February 1728 – 2 September 1792)
3. René-Julien Massey, O.S.B. (c. 1732 – 2 September 1792)

Society of the Priests of Saint Sulpice (Sulpicians)

1. Bernard-François de Cucsac, P.S.S. (c. 1758 – 2 September 1792)
2. Thomas-Nicolas Dubray, P.S.S. (21 January 1746 – 2 September 1792)
3. Jacques-Gabriel Galais, P.S.S. (15 April 1754 – 2 September 1792)
4. Pierre Gauguin, P.S.S. (12 February 1725 – 2 September 1792)
5. Pierre-Michel Guérin, P.S.S. (8 March 1759 – 2 September 1792)
6. Jacques-Étienne-Philippe Hourrier, P.S.S. (16 July 1751 – 2 September 1792)
7. Henri-August Luzeau de la Mulonnière, P.S.S. (1 December 1762 – 2 September 1792)
8. Jean-Baptiste-Michel Pontus, P.S.S. (19 June 1763 – 2 September 1792)
9. Pierre-Nicolas Psalmon, P.S.S. (29 June 1749 – 2 September 1792)
10. Claude Rousseau, P.S.S. (1 May 1751 – 2 September 1792)
11. Jean-Antoine Savine, P.S.S. (20 June 1760 – 2 September 1792)
12. Jean-Baptiste-Marie Tessier, P.S.S. (1761 – 2 September 1792)

Order of Friars Minor Conventual (Conventual Franciscans)

1. Jean-François Burté, O.F.M. Conv. (20 June 1740 – 2 September 1792)

Franciscan Friars of the Third Order Regular

1. Georges Girault (Séverin), T.O.R. (14 January 1728 – 2 September 1792)

Congregation of Jesus and Mary (Eudists)

1. François-Louis Hébert, C.I.M. (14 September 1735 – 2 September 1792)
2. François Lefranc, C.I.M. (26 March 1739 – 2 September 1792)
3. Pierre-Claude Pottier, C.I.M. (20 September 1743 – 3 September 1792)

Brothers of the Christian Schools (De La Salle Brothers)

1. Guillaume-Nicolas-Louis Leclerq (Salomon), F.S.C. (15 November 1745 – 2 September 1792)

Paris Foreign Missions Society

1. Urbain Lefebvre, M.E.P. (21 January 1725 – 2 September 1792)

Congregation of the Mission (Vincentians)

1. Jean-Charles Caron, C.M. (30 September 1730 – 3 September 1792)
2. Nicolas Colin, C.M. (12 December 1730 – 3 September 1792)
3. Louis-Joseph François, C.M. (3 February 1751 – 3 September 1792)
4. Jean-Henri Gruyer, C.M. (13 June 1734 – 3 September 1792)

Capuchin Franciscans (Capuchins)

1. Jean-Jacques Morel (Apollinaire from Pozat), O.F.M. Cap. (12 June 1739 – 2 September 1792)

Congregation of Christian Doctrine (Christian Doctrine Fathers)

1. Claude Bochot, D.C. (10 July 1720 – 3 September 1792)
2. Eustache Félix, D.C. (23 April 1726 – 3 September 1792)

Canons Regular of Saint Victor

1. Jean-Charles-Marie Bernard du Cornillet, C.R.S.V. (4 August 1759 – 3 September 1792)

Canons Regular of the Congregation of France

1. Jean-François Bonnel de Pradal (5 September 1738 – 3 September 1792)
2. Claude Ponse (c. 1729 – 3 September 1792)

== See also ==
- Alexandre Lanfant
- Martyrs of Compiègne

== Sources ==
- http://www.bxmartyrsde1792.com/index2.html
