= Iroquois River (Nottaway River tributary) =

Iroquois
- Watershed of Nottaway River

Location
- Country: Canada
- Province: Quebec
- Region: Eeyou Istchee Baie-James (municipality)

Physical characteristics
- Source: Esther Lake
  - location: Eeyou Istchee Baie-James (municipality), Nord-du-Québec, Quebec
  - coordinates: 50°40′27″N 78°02′38″W
  - elevation: 239 m (784 ft)
- Mouth: Nottaway River
  - location: Eeyou Istchee Baie-James (municipality), Nord-du-Québec, Quebec
  - coordinates: 50°56′40″N 78°27′03″W
  - elevation: 98 m (322 ft)
- Length: 64.4 km (40.0 mi)

The Iroquois River is a tributary of the Nottaway, in the administrative region of Nord-du-Québec, in the Canadian province of Quebec, in Canada.

Forestry is the main economic activity of the sector. Recreational tourism activities (especially hunting and fishing) come second.

This hydrographic slope has no access forest road. The surface of the river is usually frozen from early November to mid-May, however, safe ice circulation is generally from mid-November to mid-April.

== Geography ==
The main neighboring hydrographic slopes are:

- North side: Nottaway River, Lepallier River, Fabulet River;
- East side: Fabulet River, Nottaway River;
- South side: Kitchigama River, Obamsca River;
- West side: Patrick River, Kitchigama River.

The "Iroquois River" originates at the mouth of Lake Esther (length: 5.1 kilometres (3.2 mi); width: 3.6 kilometres (2.2 mi); altitude: 244 metres (801 ft)). The mouth of Lake Esther is located at 3.4 kilometres (2.1 mi) Northeast of the Kitchigama River, at 17.4 kilometres (10.8 mi) West of Nottaway River, at 97.3 kilometres (60.5 mi) Northwest of downtown Matagami, Quebec.

From the mouth of Lake Esther, the "Iroquois River" flows on 64.4 kilometres (40.0 mi) according to the following segments:

- 24.1 kilometres (15.0 mi) North to a creek (coming from the East);
- 27.3 kilometres (17.0 mi) Northwesterly to the Fabulet River (coming from the Southeast);
- 13.0 kilometres (8.1 mi) Northwesterly to mouth.

The Iroquois River empties onto the South Bank of the Nottaway River. This confluence is located at:

- 55.4 kilometres (34.4 mi) Southeast of the mouth of the Nottaway River (confluence with Rupert Bay);
- 135 kilometres (84 mi) Northwest of downtown Matagami, Quebec;
- 110.7 kilometres (68.8 mi) Northwest of the mouth of the Matagami Lake.

== Toponymy ==
According to the Atlas of Canada, the term "Iroquois" is used in 53 site designations. The Haudenosaunee or Iroquois nations have greatly influenced toponymy in North America.

The toponym "Rivière des Iroquois" (or Iroquois River, in English) was formalized on December 5, 1968, at the Commission de toponymie du Québec, at the creation of this commission

== See also ==
- James Bay
- Rupert Bay
- Nottaway River
- Fabulet River
- List of rivers of Quebec
