= Allard River =

Allard

- Watershed of Nottaway River

Location
- Country: Canada
- Province: Quebec
- Region: Eeyou Istchee Baie-James (municipality)

Physical characteristics
- Source: Unidentified Lake
  - location: Eeyou Istchee Baie-James (municipality), Nord-du-Québec, Quebec
  - coordinates: 49°18′02″N 77°59′19″W
  - elevation: 283 m (928 ft)
- Mouth: Lake Matagami
  - location: Eeyou Istchee Baie-James (municipality), Nord-du-Québec, Quebec
  - coordinates: 49°49′58″N 77°45′01″W
  - elevation: 253 m (830 ft)
- Length: 63.5 km (39.5 mi)

Basin features
- Tributaries
  - left: Ourse River
  - right: (upstream from the mouth): Discharge of lake Watson; Dôme creek François creek Nelson creek Dollard creek

The Allard River is a tributary of the West shore of Lake Matagami which empties into the Nottaway River. The Allard River flows in the municipality of Eeyou Istchee Baie-James (municipality) in the Nord-du-Québec administrative region, in Quebec, in Canada.

The Route 109 goes North along the West side of the upper Allard River. Then this road forks to the East, then to the North, to join the town of Matagami.

The R1027 bridge spans the Allard River about 10 kilometres (6.2 mi) South of its confluence with the Lake Matagami. From this bridge, this road goes up North, cuts the Gouault River, along the West bank of the Gouault River and Lake Matagami; then it goes further North to reach the territories East of James Bay.

The Allard River flows entirely in forest and marsh areas, Southwest of Lake Matagami. The surface of the river is usually frozen from the beginning of December to the end of April.

== Geography ==
The surrounding hydrographic slopes of the Allard River are:

- North side: Bouchier Lake, Kitchigama River;
- East side: Lake Matagami, Daniel River, Bell River, Dollard Creek;
- South side: Harricana River, Daniel River, Indian River (Bell River);
- West side: Grasset Lake, Bear River, Harricana River, McClure Creek, Adam River.

The source of the Allard River is located on the Northwestern side of the watershed with the Indian River (Bell River).

The Allard River originates from a head lake (length: 0.6 kilometres (0.37 mi); elevation: 283 metres (928 ft)) on the territory of Eeyou Istchee Baie-James (Municipality), a little North of the boundary of the administrative region Abitibi-Temiscamingue. This lake is located at the crossroads of the townships of Sauvé, Razilly, Soissons and Maizerets.

From its source, the Allard River flows over 63.5 kilometres (39.5 mi) according to the following segments:

Upper part of Allard River (segment of 37.3 kilometres (23.2 mi))

- 13.7 kilometres (8.5 mi) northeasterly by collecting the waters of some streams and crossing some marsh areas, up to a bend of the river;
- 10.3 kilometres (6.4 mi) northerly, forming a curve to the Southeast, to a bend in a river where a stream flows (coming from the West);
- 5.6 kilometres (3.5 mi) easterly, forming a few curves in a marsh zone to Nelson Creek (coming from the Southeast);
- 4.8 kilometres (3.0 mi) northwesterly to Route 109;
- 2.9 kilometres (1.8 mi) north to a bend in the river where a stream (coming from the East) flows into it.

Lower part of Allard River (segment of 26.2 kilometres (16.3 mi)) Note: The Allard River is generally wider and navigable throughout its lower part.

- 5.9 kilometres (3.7 mi) westerly to a creek (coming from the west and flowing into a river bend);
- 10.3 kilometres (6.4 mi) to the North, collecting water from the Watson Lake spill (from the East) and crossing a lake formed by the widening of the river to the bridge of the road R1027;
- 10 kilometres (6.2 mi) North, then Northeast, to its confluence.

The Allard River empties onto the west shore of Lake Matagami, across from "Île aux Brochets".

The course of the Allard River runs North for about a hundred kilometers to the West shore of Lake Matagami. Its mouth is located on the South side of a large swamp area.

The confluence of the Allard River with the Lake Matagami is located at:

- 11.6 kilometres (7.2 mi) Northwest of the town of Matagami;
- 28.5 kilometres (17.7 mi) South of the mouth of the Lake Matagami;
- 7.4 kilometres (4.6 mi) West of the confluence of the Bell River with Lake Matagami;
- 102.4 kilometres (63.6 mi) Northwest of the village center of Lebel-sur-Quévillon, Quebec;
- 182 kilometres (113 mi) Southeast of the confluence of the Nottaway River with Rupert Bay;
- 124.4 kilometres (77.3 mi) Northeast of the Ontario boundary.

Located at the extreme north of the township of Maizerets, the "Portage Allard", an approximate length of 4 kilometres (2.5 mi), connects the rivers Harricana and Allard.

== Toponymy ==
The Algonquins designate this watercourse "Sagackweia Sibi", meaning "river of the great valley with hay".

The term "Allard" evokes the work of life of the lawyer and politician Jules Allard, born in Saint-François-du-Lac, Quebec in 1859 and died in 1945 in Montreal. In 1883, at the end of his studies at Laval University, Allard was admitted to the Quebec Bar. From 1897, Allard was elected Liberal MP in Yamaska on several occasions. Alternately, he headed the "Colonization and Public Works Ministries" in 1905, "Public Works and Labor" in 1905 and 1906, Agriculture from 1906 to 1909 and finally Lands and Forests from 1909 to 1919.

As such, he initialed in 1911, a map of the region of Abitibi, which identifies the river bearing his family name. In addition to his duties as Leader of the Government in the Quebec Legislative Council, he acts as interim Prime Minister and President of the Quebec Executive Council during the absence of Prime Minister Sir Lomer Gouin. The Canton of Mauritius has also been designated in its name.

The toponym "Allard River" was formalized on December 5, 1968, at the Commission de toponymie du Quebec, i.e. at the creation of this commission.

== See also ==
- Nottaway River
- Lake Matagami
- Rupert Bay
- James Bay
- Eeyou Istchee Baie-James (municipality), a municipality
- James Bay
- List of rivers of Quebec
