= Château de Lascoux =

Château in Nouvelle-Aquitaine, France

Coordinates: 45°17′48″N 0°24′45″E

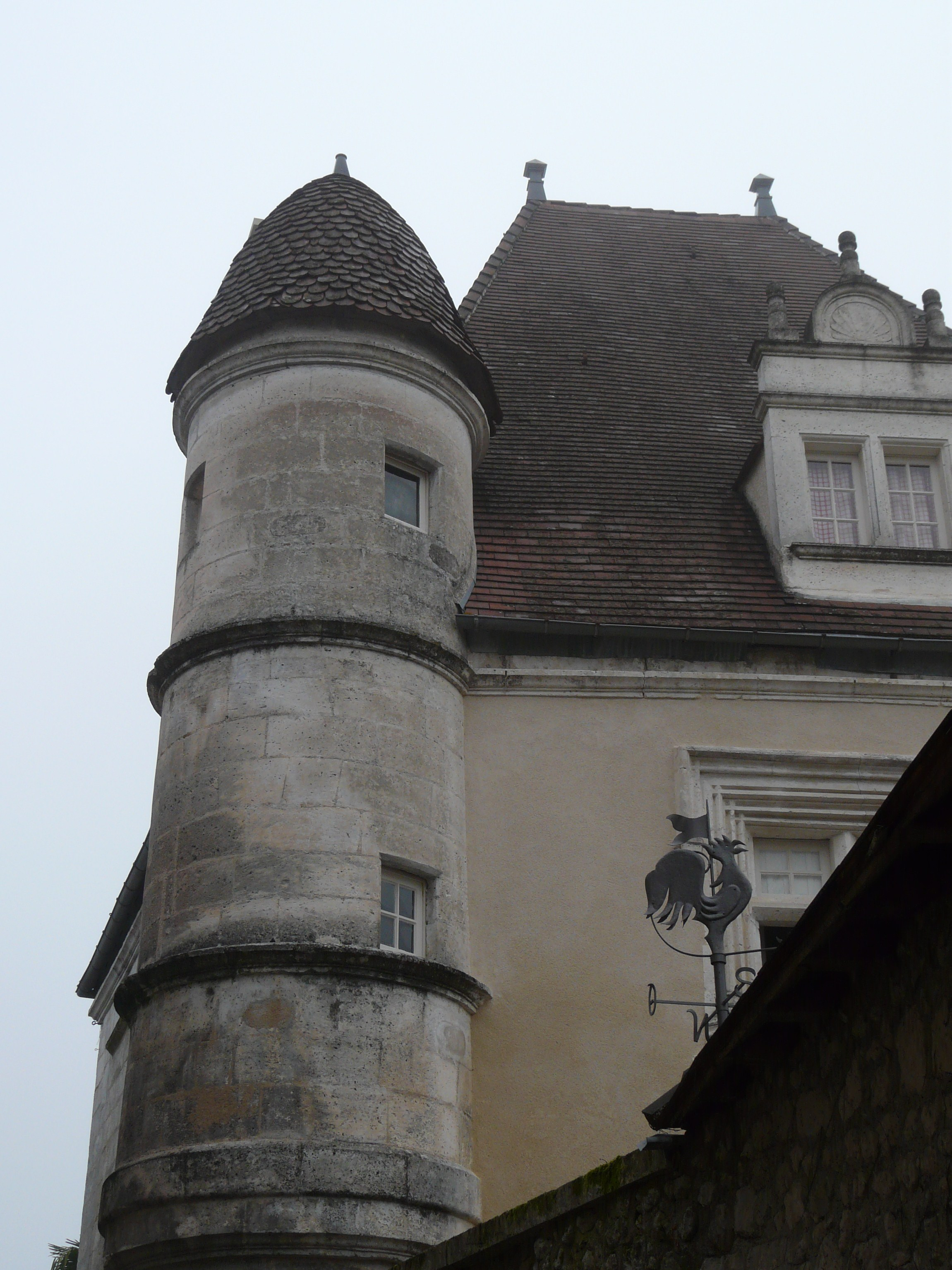
Château de Lascoux

The Château de Lascoux, also Château de Celles, is a château in Celles, Dordogne, Nouvelle-Aquitaine, France. It was built in the 16th century.

== Location ==
The Château de Lascoux, or Château de Celles, Ribéracois, in the heart of the town of Celles, south of the church Saint-Pierre.

== Notable people ==
Armand de Foucauld de Pontbriand was born here.
