= Celles, Dordogne =

Celles
- Commune
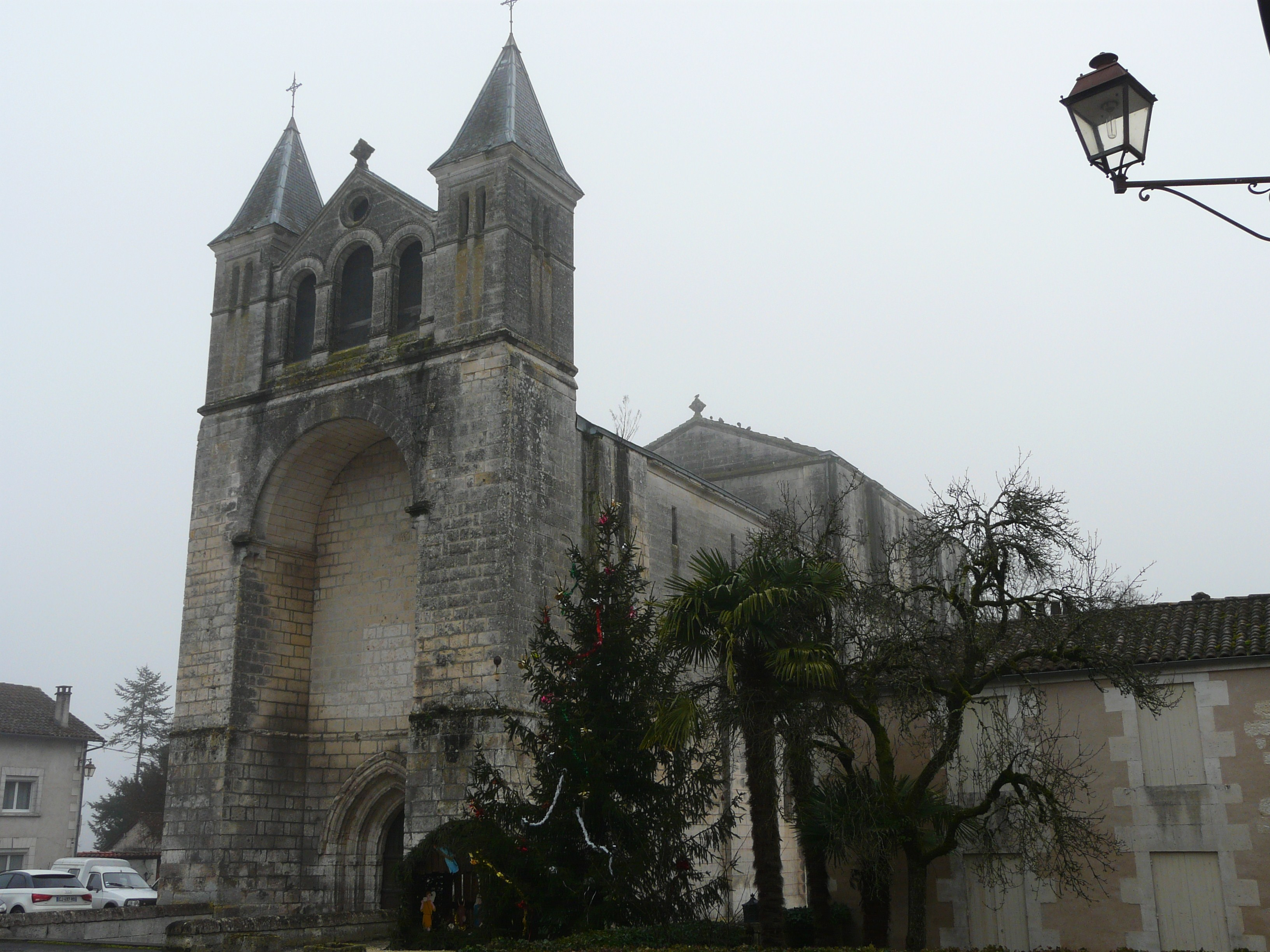
- The church in Celles
- Location of Celles
- Location within France Location within Nouvelle-Aquitaine
- Coordinates: 45°17′51″N 0°24′47″E
- Country: France
- Region: Nouvelle-Aquitaine
- Department: Dordogne
- Arrondissement: Périgueux
- Canton: Ribérac

Government
  - Mayor (2020–2026): Jean-Didier Andrieux
- Area^{1}: 27.83 km^{2} (10.75 sq mi)
- Elevation: 91 m (299 ft)
- Highest elevation: 213 m (699 ft)
- Lowest elevation: 61 m (200 ft)
- Population (2023): 619
  - Density: 22.2/km^{2} (57.6/sq mi)
- Time zone: UTC+01:00 (CET)
  - Summer (DST): UTC+02:00 (CEST)
- INSEE/Postal code: 24090 /24600
- ^{1} French Land Register data, which excludes lakes, ponds, glaciers > 1 km^{2} (0.386 sq mi or 247 acres) and river estuaries.

Celles (French pronunciation: [sɛl]; Occitan: Cela) is a commune in the Dordogne department in Nouvelle-Aquitaine in southwestern France.

== Population ==
Historical population
Year	Pop.	±% p.a.
1968	675	—
1975	582	−2.10%
1982	600	+0.44%
1990	597	−0.06%
1999	552	−0.87%
2007	555	+0.07%
2012	563	+0.29%
2017	587	+0.84%
2023	619	+0.89%
Source: INSEE

== See also ==
- Communes of the Dordogne department
- Château de Lascoux
