= Alexandre Lanfant =

French Jesuit

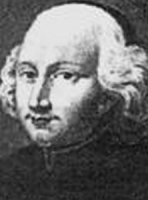
- Born: Anne-Alexander-Charles-Marie Lanfant; September 9, 1726; Lyon, France
- Died: September 2, 1792 (aged 65); Prison de l'Abbaye, Paris, France
- Cause of death: September Massacres
- Occupation: Jesuit priest

Alexandre Charles Lanfant (September 9, 1726 – September 2, 1792) was a French Jesuit, who served as preacher at the imperial court in Vienna, and later as confessor to King Louis XVI. Killed during the French Revolution, he was beatified by Pope Pius XI.

== Early life and education ==
Anne-Alexander-Charles-Marie Lanfant was born September 9, 1726, in Lyon and baptized the next day in the church of Saint-Martin d'Ainay. He entered the Society of Jesus at Avignon in 1741. He taught at Aix-en-Provence, Besancon and Marseilles, and took his religious vows in 1760. He was then assigned to the mission at Nancy.

== Priesthood ==
In 1762, after the suppression of the order in Paris, he served as a priest in Lorraine under the protection of the duke, Stanisław Leszczyński. There, in February 1766, he gave a funeral oration upon the death of Louis, Dauphin of France. The duke died shortly thereafter and Lanfant stayed at the imperial court in Vienna, serving as preacher to Maria Theresa Habsburg.

After three years, he returned to Paris. The late Dauphin's son, Louis XVI appointed him preacher at the royal court. He also served as the king's confessor from 1789 to 1791. A renowned orator, greatly devoted to the Sacred Heart, Lanfant encouraged the distribution of a pamphlet calling for forty days of prayer and penance which ended with a solemn prayer of consecration to the Sacred Heart in June 1790.

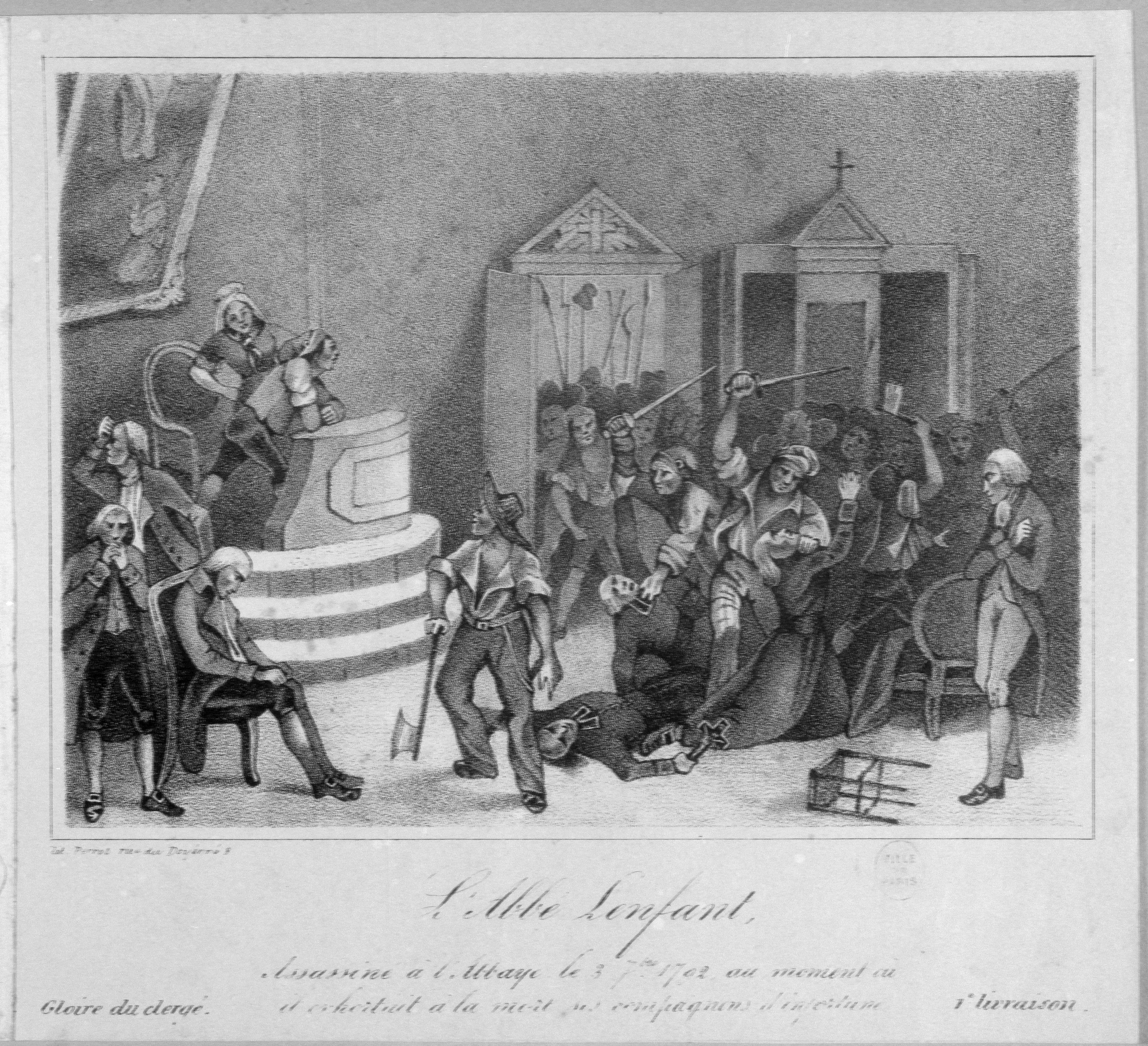
The assassination of Lanfant in 1792

== Death and martyrdom ==
Lanfant refused to take an oath to the civil constitution of the clergy. He was arrested on August 29, 1792, on charges of influencing the monarch. Although a "constitutional" priest obtained his release from the Abbey of Saint-Germaine-des-Pres, he was recaptured and sent to the Prison de l'Abbaye, where he was killed on September 5 by the revolutionary mob. He was one of 300 clergy victims of the so-called September massacres.

Lanfant was the author of memoirs and eight volumes of sermons.

He was among the 191 martyrs of Paris beatified by Pope Pius XI on October 17, 1926.
