= Biras =

- Commune
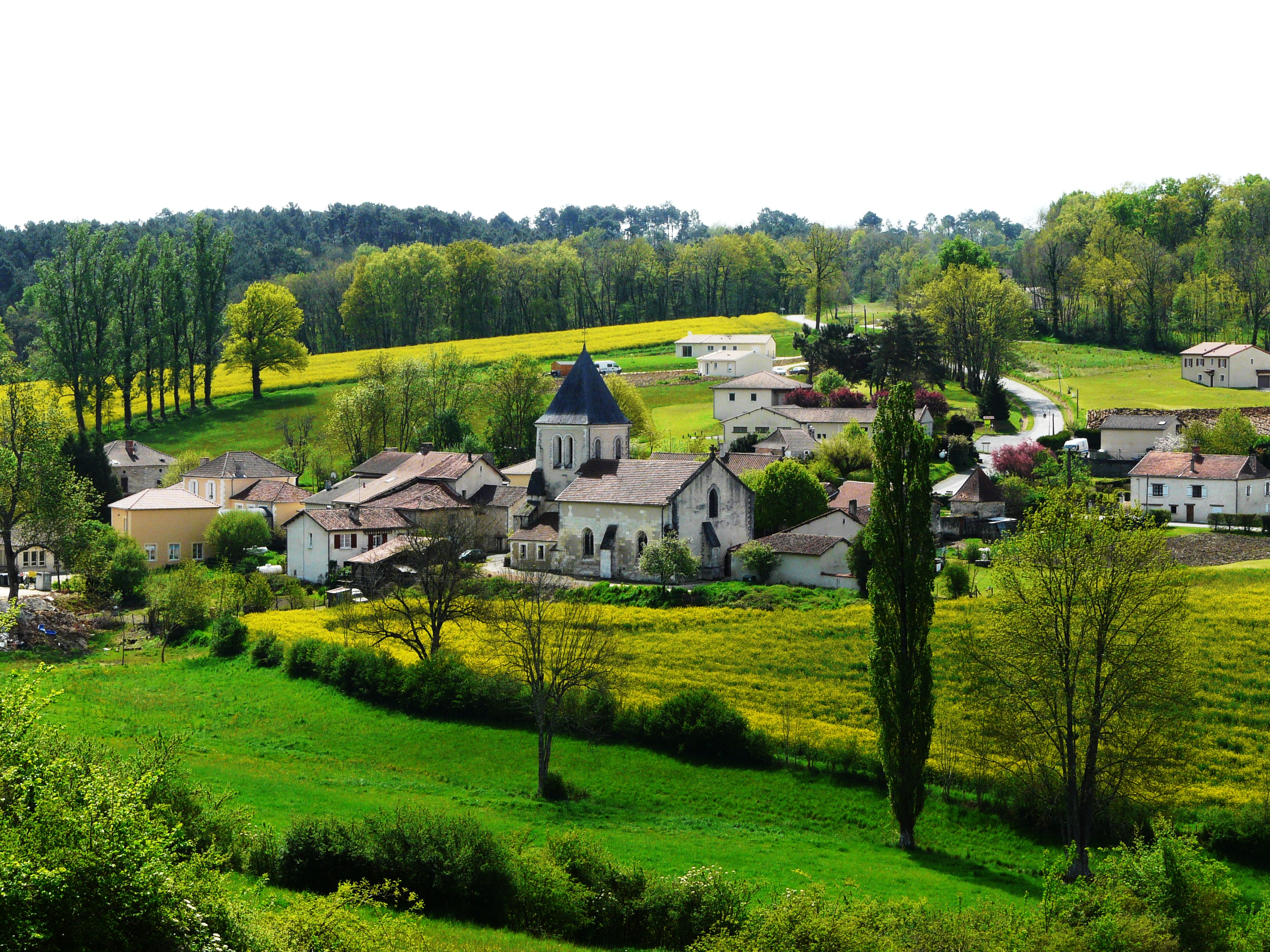
- A general view of Biras
- Location of Biras
- Location within France Location within Nouvelle-Aquitaine
- Coordinates: 45°17′19″N 0°38′22″E
- Country: France
- Region: Nouvelle-Aquitaine
- Department: Dordogne
- Arrondissement: Nontron
- Canton: Brantôme en Périgord
- Intercommunality: Dronne et Belle

Government
  - Mayor (2020–2026): Jean-Michel Nadal
- Area^{1}: 19.43 km^{2} (7.50 sq mi)
- Highest elevation: 237 m (778 ft)
- Lowest elevation: 119 m (390 ft)
- Population (2023): 731
  - Density: 37.6/km^{2} (97.4/sq mi)
- Time zone: UTC+01:00 (CET)
  - Summer (DST): UTC+02:00 (CEST)
- INSEE/Postal code: 24042 /24310
- ^{1} French Land Register data, which excludes lakes, ponds, glaciers > 1 km^{2} (0.386 sq mi or 247 acres) and river estuaries.

Biras (French pronunciation: [biʁa]; Occitan: Biràs) is a commune in the Dordogne department in southwestern France.

== Population ==
Historical population
Year	Pop.	±% p.a.
1968	344	—
1975	343	−0.04%
1982	354	+0.45%
1990	372	+0.62%
1999	362	−0.30%
2007	512	+4.43%
2012	613	+3.67%
2017	664	+1.61%
2023	731	+1.62%
Source: INSEE

== See also ==
- Communes of the Dordogne département
