= André Grasset =

Blessed André Grasset
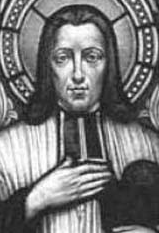
- Born: André Grasset de Saint-Sauveur; 3 April 1758; Montreal, New France, Kingdom of France
- Died: 2 September 1792 (aged 34); Paris, France
- Beatified: 1 October 1926, Rome by Pope Pius XI

André Grasset de Saint-Sauveur (3 April 1758 – 2 September 1792) was a Canadian-born French Catholic priest who was martyred in Paris during the French Revolution. In 1926, he became the first Canadian-born person to be beatified.

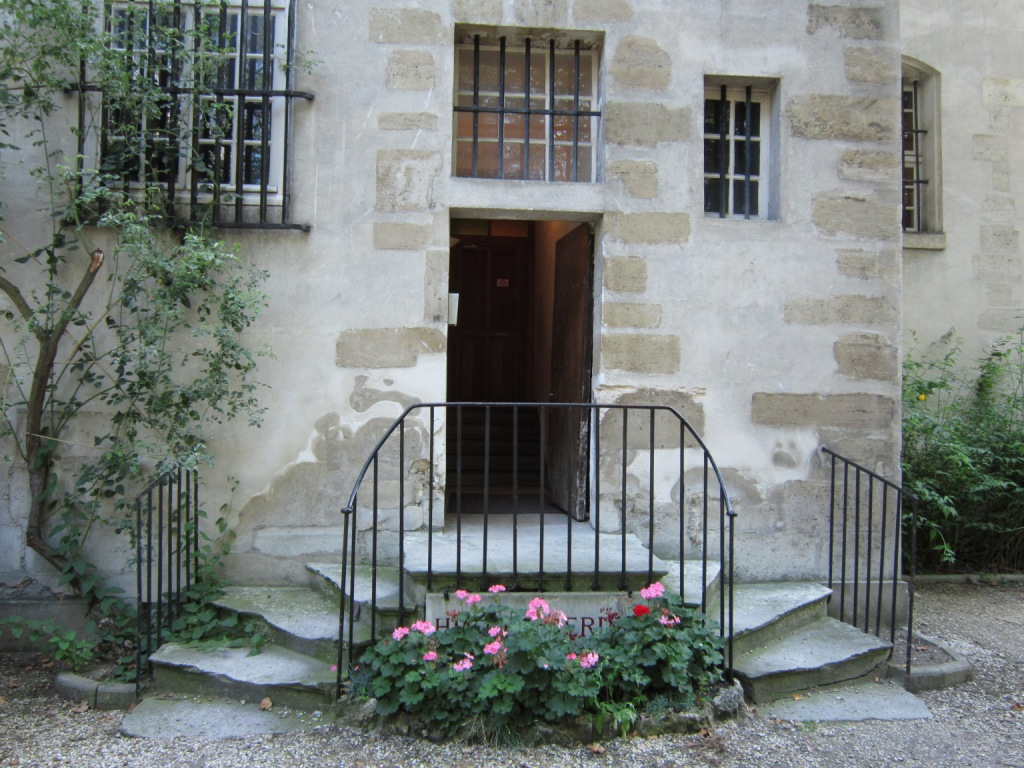
Escalier des martyrs, Église Saint-Joseph-des-Carmes

== Life ==
He was born in Montreal to an immigrant from Montpellier, France, André Grasset de Saint-Sauveur senior (1720-1794), who had come to Canada (then known as New France) to be the secretary to the Governor General of New France. After his first wife died, he remarried to Marie-Josephte Quesnel-Fonblanche and had five children, of whom André was the second-born. He was baptised at Notre-Dame Church in Montreal. In 1764, at the age of six, he accompanied his father, who had decided to return to France following the Treaty of Paris in 1763. They lived in Calais. He studied at the Collège Sainte-Barbe in Paris, then entered the priesthood in Sens, being ordained there in 1783.

In 1791 the National Constituent Assembly obliged all members of the clergy, under pain of death, to sign the Civil Constitution of the Clergy, which would nullify their allegiance to the Pope and essentially render them servants of the state. Although a small number of bishops and priests complied, most refused. Grasset sought refuge with the Eudist Fathers in the Maison des Tourettes, but was captured in 1792 and imprisoned in the former Carmelite convent now known as the Carmes Prison.

On 2 September 1792, along with 3 bishops and 92 other priests also held at the prison, they were once again asked to sign the Civil Constitution but all replied that their conscience forbade them to do so. All 96 clergy were then killed by the guards, using bayonets, swords and spikes, and their bodies disposed of in ditches and drains around Paris. In addition, 72 priests at the Seminary of Saint-Firmin, 21 priests at the Abbey of Saint-Germain and 3 priests at the Prison de la Force were similarly murdered. In the ensuing few days as many as 1,400 people were murdered.

== Beatification ==
André Grasset was declared Venerable by Pope Pius XI under a Decree of Martyrdom on 1 October 1926, and he was among the 188 bishops, priests, monks, nuns and laypeople beatified as the Holy September Martyrs on 17 October 1926, being the first Canadian-born person to be beatified.

== Memorials ==
Collège André-Grasset, a post-secondary institution in Montreal was founded by the Sulpician order in 1927.

The altar of the Chapel of the Blessed Sacrament in Notre Dame Basilica, Montreal, is dedicated to the martyrs of the revolution. A stained-glass window bearing Grasset's image is also in the Basilica.
