= Samson River =

River in Estrie, Quebec, Canada

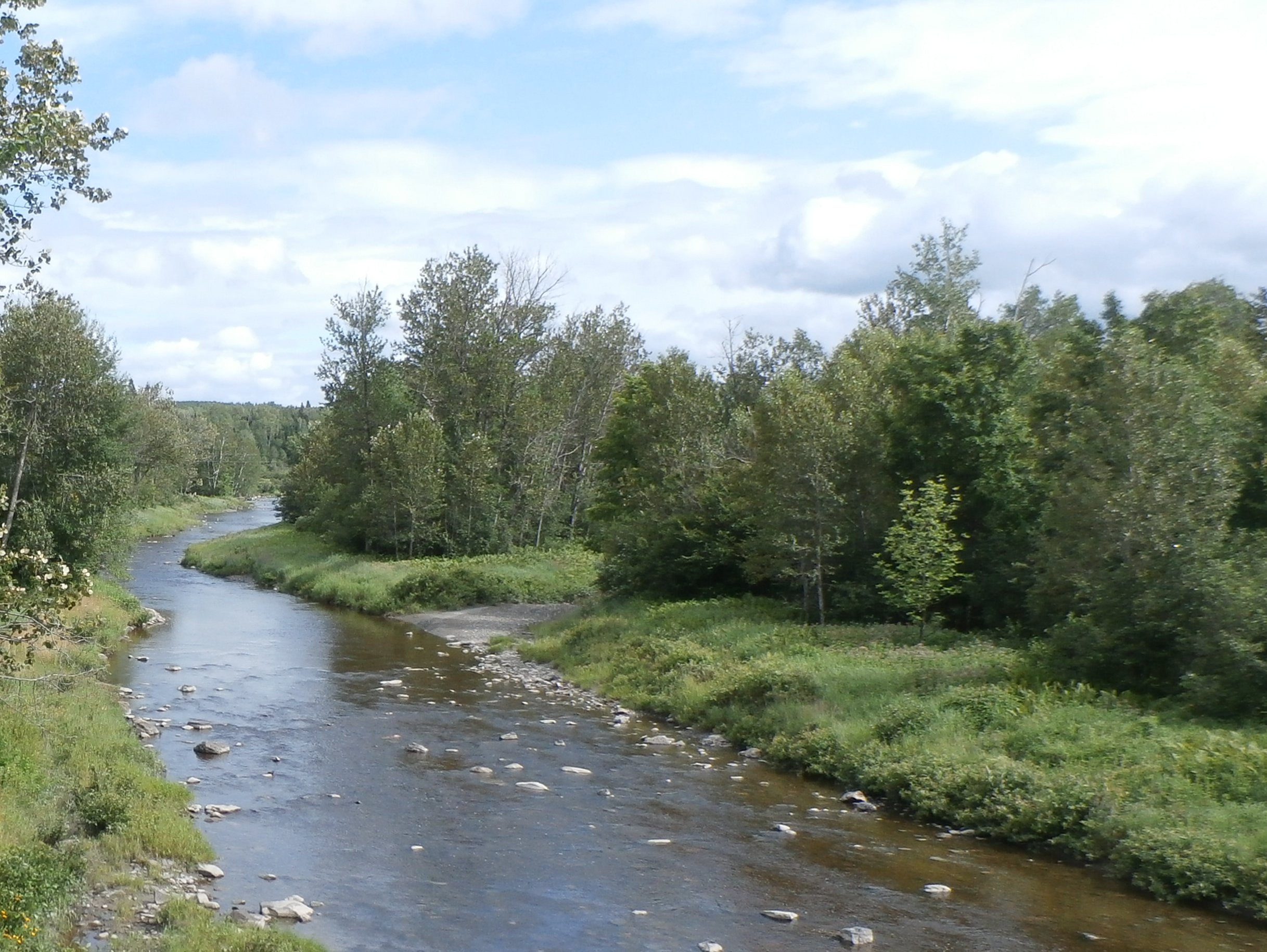
- Samson River seen south from Route 204.

- Location within Quebec

Location
- Country: Canada
- Province: Quebec
- Region: Estrie
- MRC: Le Granit Regional County Municipality

Physical characteristics
- Source: Mountain streams
  - location: Audet, (MRC) Le Granit Regional County Municipality, Québec
  - coordinates: 45.596675°N 70.658688°W
  - elevation: 520 metres (1,710 ft)
- Mouth: Chaudière River
  - location: Saint-Gédéon-de-Beauce
  - coordinates: 45.79972°N 70.63583°W
  - elevation: 261 metres (856 ft)
- Length: 30.3 kilometres (18.8 mi)

Basin features
- Progression: Chaudière River, St. Lawrence River
- River system: St. Lawrence River
- Tributaries
  - left: (upstream)
  - right: (upstream) ruisseau Bédet-Busque, ruisseau à Nipit-Mercier, ruisseau des Trente Ponts, ruisseau Poléon-Mathieu, rivière du Barrage.

The Samson River (in French: rivière Samson) is a tributary of the east bank of the Chaudière River, which flows northward to empty on the south bank of the St. Lawrence River, in Quebec, in Canada.

== Toponymy ==
The river was named "Toulidesihontes" in 1759 on John Montresor's map. On the 1884 Alfred Richard Cecil Selwyn of 1884, an Indian trail linked the Chaudière River, facing the Drolet River, eastward to the Samson River following a small valley, a few hundred meters to the north, parallel to the Route de l'Eglise in Audet, then rang 7 passing north of Mont Dostie towards the sources of the Samson River. The toponym "Samson" appears on various survey plans from the end of the 19th century. The term "Samson" is a family name of French origin. The toponym Samson River was formalized on December 5, 1968, at the Commission de toponymie du Québec.

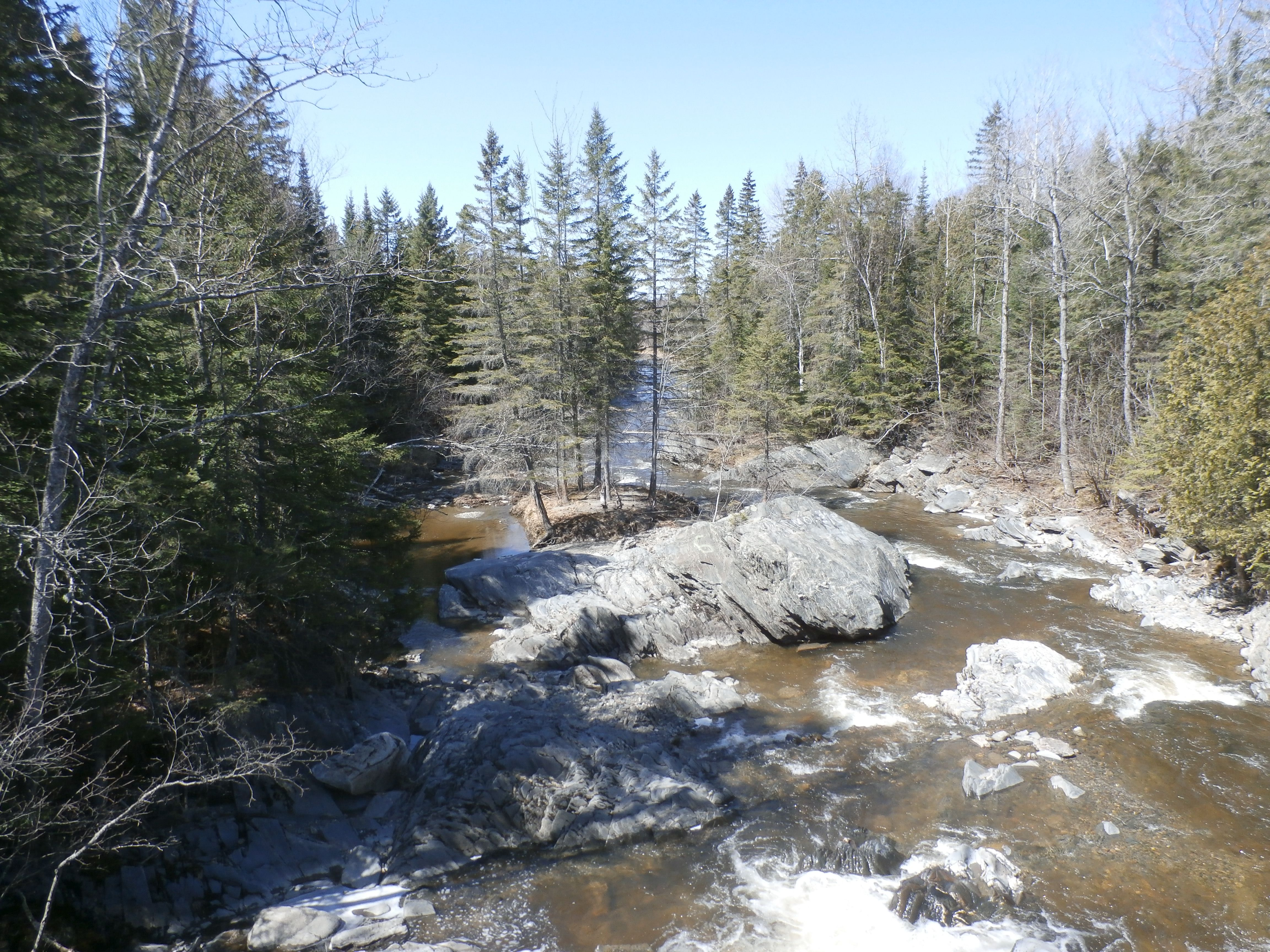
Rivière Samson downstream of the road bridge from the Moulin à Audet

=== See also ===
- List of rivers of Quebec
