= Kitchigama River =

Kitchigama
- Watershed of Nottaway River

Location
- Country: Canada
- Province: Quebec
- Region: Eeyou Istchee Baie-James (municipality)

Physical characteristics
- Source: Grasset lake (Eeyou Istchee Baie-James)
  - location: Eeyou Istchee Baie-James (municipality), Nord-du-Québec, Quebec
  - coordinates: 49°59′05″N 78°10′07″W
  - elevation: 250 m (820 ft)
- Mouth: Nottaway River
  - location: Eeyou Istchee Baie-James (municipality), Nord-du-Québec, Quebec
  - coordinates: 51°04′13″N 78°42′57″W
  - elevation: 49 m (161 ft)
- Length: 191.8 km (119.2 mi)

Basin features
- Tributaries
  - left: (from the mouth) Kashapuminatikuch creek discharge of Lake La Forest; Supercase River (via le Lake Grasset (Eeyou Istchee Baie-James))
  - right: (from the mouth) Kamivakutisi creek discharge of Lake Montreau; Pahunan River discharge of lakes Testard and Gabriel discharge of lake Guay

The Kitchigama River is a river in the Eeyou Istchee Baie-James, in the administrative region of Nord-du-Québec, in Quebec, in Canada. It is a tributary of the Nottaway River.

This hydrographic slope has no access forest road. The surface of the river is usually frozen from early November to mid-May, however, safe ice circulation is generally from mid-November to mid-April.

== Geography ==
The Kitchigama River originates at the mouth of Grasset Lake (Eeyou Istchee James Bay) (length: 14.3 kilometres (8.9 mi); width: 8.4 kilometres (5.2 mi); 250 metres (820 ft)) which is located in Grasset Township. It is surrounded by large swamp areas. It receives the waters of the Supercase River on the south side and the waters of two unidentified streams on the east side.

The mouth of the lake is located at 18.3 kilometres (11.4 mi) northwest of a bay Matagami Lake, 34.4 kilometres (21.4 mi) northwest of downtown of Matagami and at 126 kilometres (78 mi) southeasterly of the mouth of the Kitchigama River (confluence with the Nottaway River).

The river meanders about 180 kilometres (110 mi) in the characteristic swampy lowlands of the region, parallel to the Nottaway River. From Grasset Lake (Eeyou Istchee James Bay), the Kitchigama River flows over 191.8 kilometres (119.2 mi) according to the following segments:

Upper Kitchigama River (segment of 46.1 kilometres (28.6 mi))

- 15.5 kilometres (9.6 mi) north, to the outlet of Lac La Forest (coming from the North-West);
- 7.0 kilometres (4.3 mi) northeasterly, to the outlet of Testard and Gabriel lakes (from the southeast);
- 15.9 kilometres (9.9 mi) northeasterly to the northern limit of La Forest Township;
- 6.2 kilometres (3.9 mi) northeasterly to Kashapuminatikuch Creek (from the North);
- 1.5 kilometres (0.93 mi) east to the confluence of the Pahunan River;

Kitchigama River Intermediate Course (segment of 60.3 kilometres (37.5 mi))

- 19.8 kilometres (12.3 mi) north, to the outlet of Lake Montreau (coming from the East);
- 10.5 kilometres (6.5 mi) northwest to marsh areas, skirting an island of 3.6 kilometres (2.2 mi) to the end of the island;
- 30 kilometres (19 mi) northwesterly to the outlet of Kamivakutisi Lake (coming from the West);

Lower Kitchigama River (segment of 85.4 kilometres (53.1 mi))

- 39.6 kilometres (24.6 mi) northwesterly to a bend in the river;
- 25.4 kilometres (15.8 mi) northwesterly from the northeastern side of a filamentous melt to a bend in the river;
- 20.4 kilometres (12.7 mi) north to mouth.

The mouth of the Kitchigama River flows to the southwestern shore of the Nottaway River at about 20 kilometres (12 mi) south-west of it, before flowing into it, 50 kilometres (31 mi) before reaching James Bay. This confluence is located at:

- 142.5 kilometres (88.5 mi) Northwest of the mouth of Matagami Lake;
- 165 kilometres (103 mi) North-west of downtown Matagami, Quebec;
- 56 kilometres (35 mi) East of the Ontario - Quebec border.

== Etymology ==
The name Kitchigama would be derived from kitci and kami, meaning large body of water in algonquin.

This name appears in 1896 on the map of Robert Bell. Some explorers of European descent have designated this river "Fall to Gama". According to father Georges Lemoine, the name "Kitchigama" is of Algonquin origin. This term would be derived from "kitci" and "kami", meaning "large body of water". According to Father Joseph-Étienne Guinard, the Crees and the Algonquins the term "Kitchigami" means "the sea, the ocean and all large bodies of water".

In the course of history, several graphic variants have been identified: Kitchigoma, Michagami, Michagimi, Matchigama, Michigama, Mitchagimi, Mitchigami. Recent Cree surveys have identified the toponym "Minikwanaw Shipish", translated as "river of the mountain that drinks". Other Cree appellation of origin identify certain segments of the river, including "Kachiwapaminakuch Sipi", meaning "it can be seen from the river"; and "Nakatewakamiu Sipi, meaning" river with black water".

== See also ==
- Eeyou Istchee Baie-James (municipality), a municipality
- Nottaway River, a watercourse
- Grasset Lake (Eeyou Istchee James Bay), a lake
- Supercase River, a watercourse
- Pahunan River, a watercourse
- James Bay
- List of rivers of Quebec
