= Blondeau River (Chibougamau Lake) =

Blondeau
- Watershed of Nottaway River

Location
- Country: Canada
- Province: Quebec
- Region: Nord-du-Québec

Physical characteristics
- Source: Blondeau Lake
  - location: Chibougamau, Nord-du-Québec, Quebec
  - coordinates: 49°58′11″N 74°41′50″W
  - elevation: 416 m (1,365 ft)
- Mouth: Chibougamau Lake (via McKenzie Bay)
  - location: Chibougamau, Nord-du-Québec, Quebec
  - coordinates: 49°59′17″N 74°08′41″W
  - elevation: 379 m (1,243 ft)
- Length: 5.6 km (3.5 mi)

Basin features
- Tributaries
  - left: Oreille River

The Blondeau River is a tributary of Chibougamau Lake (via McKenzie Bay), flowing entirely into the town of Chibougamau, in Jamésie, in the administrative region of Nord-du-Québec, in the province of Quebec, in Canada.

The course of the river flows entirely in the canton of Roy.

The hydrographic slope of the Blondeau River is accessible by the junction of a forest road (east–west direction) serving the north side of Chibougamau Lake; the latter is connected to route 167 which also serves the south side of Waconichi Lake and the Waconichi River. This last road comes from Chibougamau, going north-east to the south-eastern part of Mistassini Lake.

The surface of the Blondeau River is usually frozen from early November to mid-May, however, safe ice circulation is generally from mid-November to mid-April.

== Geography ==
The main hydrographic slopes near the "Blondeau River" are:

- North side: Natevier river, Waconichi Lake, Mistassini Lake ("Baie de Poste"), Barlow River (Chibougamau River);
- East side: Nepton River, Nepton River North, France River, Boisvert River, Chief River, Chonard River;
- South side: Chibougamau Lake, Armitage River, Énard River;
- West side: Natevier River, Chibougamau River, Chevrillon Lake.

The Blondeau River has its source at the mouth of lake Blondeau (length: 1.8 kilometres (1.1 mi); altitude: 402 metres (1,319 ft)) in the township of Roy. This source is located at:

- 1.8 kilometres (1.1 mi) northwest of the mouth of the Blondeau River (confluence with Chibougamau Lake);
- 5.5 kilometres (3.4 mi) south-east of Waconichi Lake;
- 38 kilometres (24 mi) south of Mistassini Lake;
- 17.4 kilometres (10.8 mi) north-east of downtown Chibougamau;
- 11.1 kilometres (6.9 mi) north-east of the mouth of the Chibougamau River (confluence with the Opawica River);

From the mouth of Blondeau Lake, the Blondeau River flows over 5.6 kilometres (3.5 mi), according to the following segments:

- 1.2 kilometres (0.75 mi) northeasterly in Roy Township, to the confluence of the Oreille River;
- 4.4 kilometres (2.7 mi) East, then South, to its mouth.

The Blondeau River flows onto the north shore of McKenzie Bay (facing Marina Island) which is an extension to the northeast of Chibougamau Lake. From this mouth, the current crosses this bay to the south, borrows the McKenzie Passage which is crossed by a road bridge, before crossing it to the Southwest Chibougamau Lake bypassing the Portage Island which bound to the north-east the Dorés Lake (Chibougamau River). Chibougamau Lake is the main head lake of Chibougamau River.

From the mouth of Chibougamau Lake, the current crosses Dorés Lake (Chibougamau River), then generally descends to the Southwest (except the large S of the upper part of the river) along the Chibougamau River to its confluence with the Opawica River. From this confluence, the current flows generally southwesterly through the Waswanipi River to the east shore of Goéland Lake (Waswanipi River). The latter is crossed to the northwest by the Waswanipi River which is a tributary of Matagami Lake. Finally, the current flows along the Nottaway River and empties into Rupert Bay, south of the James Bay.

The mouth of the Blondeau River located at:

- 6.4 kilometres (4.0 mi) south-east of Waconichi Lake;
- 38 kilometres (24 mi) south-west of Mistassini Lake;
- 11.5 kilometres (7.1 mi) North of the mouth of Chibougamau Lake;
- 135.4 kilometres (84.1 mi) north-east of the mouth of the Chibougamau River (confluence with the Opawica River);
- 369 kilometres (229 mi) south-east of the mouth of the Nottaway River;
- 55.6 kilometres (34.5 mi) north-east of the village center of Chapais, Quebec;
- 18.6 kilometres (11.6 mi) north-east of downtown Chibougamau.

== Toponym ==
The toponym Blondeau River was formalized on December 5, 1968, at the Commission de toponymie du Québec, i.e. at the foundation of this commission.

== See also ==
- James Bay
- Rupert Bay
- Nottaway River, a watercourse
- Matgami Lake, a body of water
- Waswanipi River, a watercourse
- Goéland Lake (Waswanipi River), a body of water
- Chibougamau River, a watercourse
- Chibougamau Lake, a body of water
- Chibougamau, a city
- List of rivers of Quebec
