= Faribault River =

Faribault
- Watershed of Nottaway River

Location
- Country: Canada
- Province: Quebec
- Region: Nord-du-Québec

Physical characteristics
- Source: Eau Verte Sud Lake
  - location: Eeyou Istchee James Bay (municipality), Nord-du-Québec, Quebec
  - coordinates: 50°00′18″N 74°14′38″W
  - elevation: 405 m (1,329 ft)
- Mouth: Chibougamau River
  - location: Eeyou Istchee James Bay (municipality), Nord-du-Québec, Quebec
  - coordinates: 50°00′39″N 74°24′02″W
  - elevation: 365 m (1,198 ft)
- Length: 18.4 km (11.4 mi)

Basin features
- Tributaries
  - right: Dufault creek

The Faribault River is a tributary of the east bank of the Chibougamau River flowing into Eeyou Istchee Baie-James (municipality), in Jamésie, in the administrative region from Nord-du-Québec, in Quebec, Canada.

This river runs successively through the townships of Roy, Mackenzie and Blaiklock.

Forestry is the main economic activity of the sector; recreational tourism activities, second.

The Faribault River valley is served by the forest road (North-South direction) connected to the South at the route 167 which passes to Chibougamau.

The surface of the Faribault River is usually frozen from early November to mid-May, however, safe ice circulation is generally from mid-November to mid-April.

== Geography ==
The hydrographic slopes near the Faribault River are:
- north side: Chibougamau River, Blaiklock River, Mistago River, Barlow River (Chibougamau River);
- east side: Chébistuane River, Chibougamau River, Waconichi Lake, Chibougamau Lake, Mistassini Lake;
- south side: Chibougamau River, Obatogamau River, David Lake, Dorés Lake (Chibougamau River);
- west side: Opémisca River, Chevrillon Lake, Chibougamau River.

The Faribault River originated in Eeyou Istchee Baie-James (municipality), at the mouth of the lake of Eau Verte Sud (length: 0.4 kilometres (0.25 mi); altitude: 405 metres (1,329 ft)) in the township of Roy. The mouth of this head lake is located close to the north limit of Chibougamau city at:

- 11.3 kilometres (7.0 mi) north-east of the mouth of the Faribault River;
- 55.4 kilometres (34.4 mi) north-east of the mouth of the Opémisca Lake;
- 13.8 kilometres (8.6 mi) north-east of downtown Chibougamau;
- 128.4 kilometres (79.8 mi) south-east of the confluence of the Opawica River and Chibougamau River, this confluence is the head of the Waswanipi River;
- 192.7 kilometres (119.7 mi) north-east of the mouth of Goéland Lake;
- 360 kilometres (220 mi) east of the mouth of the Nottaway River;

From the mouth of the head lake, the Faribault River flows over 18.4 kilometres (11.4 mi) according to the following segments:

- 1.1 kilometres (0.68 mi) North in Roy Township crossing the Eau Verte Lake (elevation: 404 metres (1,325 ft)) on 0.4 kilometres (0.25 mi) to the eastern limit of McKenzie Township;
- 5.1 kilometres (3.2 mi) northwesterly to the southern boundary of Blaiklock Township;
- 3.9 kilometres (2.4 mi) westerly in Blaiklock Township to the north boundary of McKenzie Township;
- 4.2 kilometres (2.6 mi) southwesterly to Dufault Creek;
- 4.1 kilometres (2.5 mi) northwest to marsh area to mouth.

The Faribault River flows on the east bank of the Chibougamau River. The latter generally flows south-west to its confluence with the Opawica River; this confluence is the source of the Waswanipi River. The course flows westward through the northern portion of lake Waswanipi, Goéland Lake and Olga Lake, before discharging into Matagami Lake which in turn flows into the Nottaway River, a tributary of Rupert Bay James Bay).

The confluence of the Faribault River with the Chibougamau River is located at:

- 118.3 kilometres (73.5 mi) north-east of the mouth of the Chibougamau River (confluence with the Opawica River), being the head of the Waswanipi River;
- 181.7 kilometres (112.9 mi) north-east of the mouth of Goéland Lake;
- 350 kilometres (220 mi) east of the mouth of the Nottaway River (confluence with Rupert Bay);
- 10.8 kilometres (6.7 mi) north-west of downtown Chibougamau;
- 16.6 kilometres (10.3 mi) northwest of Chibougamau Lake;
- 12.6 kilometres (7.8 mi) south-east of Waconichi Lake;

== Toponymy ==
At various times in history, this territory has been occupied by the Attikameks, the Algonquins and the Crees.

This hydronym evokes the work of life of Eugène-Rodolphe Faribault (1869-1953), engineer. He was a member of the Mining Commission of Chibougamau, which was established in 1909 with the mission of assessing the mining potential of the region. This commission was composed of Dr. Alfred Ernest Barlow, P.Geo., J. C. Gwillim, Professor of Mining Engineering at Queen's University and A. Mr. Bateman, world-renowned geologist. In use since less than 1914, the hydroponym "Faribault River" was formalized on December 12, 1939, by the "Commission de géographie du Québec", the current Commission de toponymie du Québec.

The toponym "Faribault River" was formalized on December 5, 1968, at the Commission de toponymie du Québec, when it was created.

== See also ==
- James Bay
- Rupert Bay
- Nottaway River, a watercourse
- Matagami Lake, a body of water
- Waswanipi River, a watercourse
- Chibougamau River, a watercourse
- Eeyou Istchee James Bay (municipality)
- List of rivers of Quebec
