= Oreille River =

Oreille
- Watershed of Nottaway River

Location
- Country: Canada
- Province: Quebec
- Region: Nord-du-Québec

Physical characteristics
- Source: Lemoine Lake
  - location: Chibougamau, Nord-du-Québec, Quebec
  - coordinates: 50°00′54″N 74°10′12″W
  - elevation: 424 m (1,391 ft)
- Mouth: Blondeau River (Chibougamau Lake)
  - location: Chibougamau, Nord-du-Québec, Quebec
  - coordinates: 49°58′32″N 74°07′57″W
  - elevation: 385 m (1,263 ft)
- Length: 7.7 km (4.8 mi)

Basin features
- Tributaries
  - left: Natevier River

The Oreille River is a tributary of the Blondeau River (Chibougamau Lake), flowing entirely in the town of Chibougamau, in Jamésie, in the administrative region of Nord-du-Québec, in the province of Quebec, in Canada.

The course of the river flows entirely in the canton of Roy.

The hydrographic slope of the "Oreille River" is accessible by the junction of a forest road (East–west direction) serving the north side of Chibougamau Lake; the latter is connected to route 167 which also serves the south side of Waconichi Lake and the Waconichi River. This last road comes from Chibougamau, going north-east to the south-eastern part of Mistassini Lake.

The surface of the "Oreille River" is usually frozen from early November to mid-May, however, safe ice circulation is generally from mid-November to mid-April.

== Geography ==
The main hydrographic slopes close to the "Oreille River" are:
- North side: Waconichi Lake, Mistassini Lake (“Baie de Poste”), Barlow River (Chibougamau River);
- East side: Nepton River, Nepton River North, France River, Boisvert River, Chief River, Chonard River;
- South side: Blondeau River (Chibougamau Lake), Chibougamau Lake, Armitage River, Énard River;
- West side: Natevier River, Chibougamau River, Chevrillon Lake.

The Oreille River originates at the mouth of Lemoine Lake (length: 2.1 kilometres (1.3 mi), altitude: 424 metres (1,391 ft)) in the Township of Roy. This source is located at:

- 3.5 kilometres (2.2 mi) northwest of the mouth of the Oreille River (confluence with the Blondeau River (Chibougamau Lake));
- 1.8 kilometres (1.1 mi) south-east of the bay Route of Waconichi Lake;
- 36.1 kilometres (22.4 mi) south-west of Mistassini Lake;
- 18.2 kilometres (11.3 mi) north-east of downtown Chibougamau.

From the mouth of Lemoine Lake, the Oreille River flows over 7.7 kilometres (4.8 mi), according to the following segments:

- 2.3 kilometres (1.4 mi) to the south, then east in the township of Roy, to route 167;
- 2.3 kilometres (1.4 mi) southeasterly, crossing at 0.5 kilometres (0.31 mi) Oreille Lake (length: 0.9 kilometres (0.56 mi); altitude: 395 metres (1,296 ft)) to its mouth;
- 1.6 kilometres (0.99 mi) to the northeast, crossing on an unidentified lake 0.7 kilometres (0.43 mi) (length: 0.8 kilometres (0.50 mi); altitude: 401 metres (1,316 ft)) to its mouth;
- 1.5 kilometres (0.93 mi) south to mouth.

The Oreille River empties onto the north shore of the Blondeau River which flows to the north shore of McKenzie Bay from Chibougamau Lake. From this mouth, the current crosses this bay to the south, borrows the McKenzie Passage which is crossed by a road bridge, before crossing it to the Southwest Chibougamau Lake bypassing the island of Portage which bounded on the northeast by Dorés Lake (Chibougamau River). Chibougamau Lake is the main head lake of Chibougamau River.

From the mouth of Chibougamau Lake, the current flows through Dorés Lake (Chibougamau River), and then generally descends to the southwest (except the large S of the upper part of the river) by taking the Chibougamau River to its confluence with the Opawica River. From this confluence, the current flows generally southwesterly through the Waswanipi River to the east shore of Goéland Lake (Waswanipi River). The latter is crossed to the northwest by the Waswanipi River which is a tributary of Matagami Lake. Finally, the current flows along the Nottaway River and empties into Rupert Bay, south of James Bay.

The mouth of the "Oreille River" located at:

- 4.8 kilometres (3.0 mi) south-east of Waconichi Lake;
- 37.2 kilometres (23.1 mi) south of Mistassini Lake;
- 1.8 kilometres (1.1 mi) northwest of the mouth of the Blondeau River (Chibougamau Lake);
- 12.0 kilometres (7.5 mi) north-east of the mouth of Chibougamau Lake;
- 135.4 kilometres (84.1 mi) north-east of the mouth of the Chibougamau River (confluence with the Opawica River;
- 367 kilometres (228 mi) South of the mouth of the Nottaway River;
- 55.8 kilometres (34.7 mi) north-east of the village center of Chapais, Quebec;
- 18.3 kilometres (11.4 mi) north-east of downtown Chibougamau.

== Toponymy ==
The term "Oreille" is a family name of French origin.

The toponym "rivière Oreille" was formalized on December 5, 1968, at the Commission de toponymie du Québec, at the foundation of this commission.

== See also ==
- James Bay
- Rupert Bay
- Nottaway River, a watercourse
- Matagami Lake, a body of water
- Waswanipi River, a watercourse
- Goéland Lake (Waswanipi River), a body of water
- Chibougamau River, a watercourse
- Chibougamau Lake, a body of water
- Natevier River, a watercourse
- Blondeau River (Chibougamau Lake), a watercourse
- Chibougamau, a city
- List of rivers of Quebec
