= Natevier River =

Natevier
- Watershed of Nottaway River

Location
- Country: Canada
- Province: Quebec
- Region: Nord-du-Québec

Physical characteristics
- Source: Cummings Lake
  - location: Chibougamau, Nord-du-Québec, Quebec
  - coordinates: 49°57′12″N 74°13′52″W
  - elevation: 414 m (1,358 ft)
- Mouth: Oreille River
  - location: Chibougamau, Nord-du-Québec, Quebec
  - coordinates: 49°59′59″N 74°10′52″W
  - elevation: 399 m (1,309 ft)
- Length: 10.8 km (6.7 mi)

Basin features
- Tributaries
  - left: Discharge of Vignon Lake

The Natevier River is a tributary of the Oreille River, flowing entirely into the town of Chibougamau, Jamésie, into the administrative region of Nord-du-Québec, in the province of Quebec, in Canada.

The course of the river flows entirely in the canton of Roy.

The hydrographic slope of the Natevier River is accessible via route 167, which also serves the south side of Waconichi Lake and the Waconichi River. This last road comes from Chibougamau, going north-east to the south-eastern part of Mistassini Lake.

The surface of the Natevier River is usually frozen from early November to mid-May, however, safe ice circulation is usually from mid-November to mid-April.

== Geography ==
The main hydrographic slopes adjacent to the "Natevier River" are:

- North side: Waconichi Lake, Mistassini Lake ("baie de Poste"), Barlow River (Chibougamau River);
- East side: Nepton River, Nepton River North, France River, Boisvert River, Chief River, Chonard River;
- South side: Oreille River, Blondeau River (Chibougamau Lake), Chibougamau Lake, Armitage River, Énard River;
- West side: Lake Bourbeau, Chibougamau River, Chevrillon Lake.

The Natevier River originates at the mouth of Cummings Lake (length: 1.2 kilometres (0.75 mi) altitude: 414 metres (1,358 ft)) in the township of Roy. This lake is located on the west side of Mount Cummings with a peak of 600 metres (2,000 ft). Around twenty cottages were built on the north shore of this lake and a small lake upstream.

This source of the river is located at:

- 6.1 kilometres (3.8 mi) south-west of the mouth of the Natevier River (confluence with the Oreille River);
- 8.6 kilometres (5.3 mi) south-east of the bay Route of Waconichi Lake;
- 43.8 kilometres (27.2 mi) south-west of Mistassini Lake;
- 11.5 kilometres (7.1 mi) north-east of downtown Chibougamau.

From the mouth of Cummings Lake, the Natevier River flows over 10.8 kilometres (6.7 mi), according to the following segments:

- 2.1 kilometres (1.3 mi) north in the township of Roy along route 167 to the bridge of a road junction leading to Lake Bourbeau (located in the West);
- 4.4 kilometres (2.7 mi) northeasterly along the northwestern side of route 167, crossing a marsh zone and then crossing over 0.5 kilometres (0.31 mi) a little unidentified lake (length: 0.6 kilometres (0.37 mi); altitude: 416 metres (1,365 ft)), to its mouth;
- 4.3 kilometres (2.7 mi) northeasterly forming an eighth-eighth note to the east where it forms a loop east of route 167, then along this same road on the north-west side and collects the discharge (coming from the west) of Lake Vignon, to the mouth of the river.

The Natevier River flows to the west bank of the Oreille River; the latter is a tributary of the North shore of the Blondeau River which flows to the north shore of McKenzie Bay of Chibougamau Lake.

From this mouth, the current crosses this bay to the south, borrows the McKenzie Passage which is crossed by a road bridge, before crossing it to the Southwest on Chibougamau Lake bypassing the island of Portage which bounded on the northeast by Dorés Lake (Chibougamau River). Chibougamau Lake is the main head lake of Chibougamau River.

From the mouth of Chibougamau Lake, the current flows through Dorés Lake (Chibougamau River), and then generally descends to the Southwest (except the upper S of the upper part of the river) along the Chibougamau River, to its confluence with the Opawica River.

From this confluence, the current flows generally southwesterly through the Waswanipi River to the east shore of Goéland Lake (Waswanipi River). The latter is crossed to the northwest by the Waswanipi River which is a tributary of Matagami Lake. Finally, the current flows along the Nottaway River and empties into Rupert Bay, south of James Bay.

The mouth of the "Natevier River" located at:

- 3.3 kilometres (2.1 mi) south-east of Waconichi Lake;
- 38 kilometres (24 mi) south-west of the bay south of Mistassini Lake;
- 2.9 kilometres (1.8 mi) northwest of the mouth of the Oreille River;
- 4.4 kilometres (2.7 mi) northwest of the mouth of the Blondeau River (Chibougamau Lake);
- 11.8 kilometres (7.3 mi) North of the mouth of Chibougamau Lake;
- 133 kilometres (83 mi) north-east of the mouth of the Chibougamau River (confluence with the Opawica River;
- 364 kilometres (226 mi) south-east of the mouth of the Nottaway River;
- 53.6 kilometres (33.3 mi) north-east of the village center of Chapais, Quebec;
- 16.5 kilometres (10.3 mi) north-east of downtown Chibougamau.

== Toponymy ==
This hydronym evokes the life work of Father Pierre Natevier, a Sulpician born in France in 1697; he was assigned to Montreal in 1722.

The toponym "Rivière Natevier" was formalized on December 5, 1968, at the Commission de toponymie du Québec, i.e. at the foundation of this commission.

== See also ==
- James Bay
- Rupert Bay
- Nottaway River, a watercourse
- Matagami Lake, a body of water
- Waswanipi River, a watercourse
- Goéland Lake (Waswanipi River), a body of water
- Chibougamau River, a watercourse
- Chibougamau Lake, a body of water
- Blondeau River (Chibougamau Lake), a watercourse
- Oreille River, a watercourse
- Chibougamau, a city
- List of rivers of Quebec
