= Mistago River =

Mistago
- Watershed of Nottaway River

Location
- Country: Canada
- Province: Quebec
- Region: Nord-du-Québec

Physical characteristics
- Source: Unidentified Lake
  - location: Eeyou Istchee Baie-James, Nord-du-Québec, Quebec
  - coordinates: 50°16′37″N 74°08′13″W
  - elevation: 419 m (1,375 ft)
- Mouth: Barlow River (Chibougamau River)
  - location: Eeyou Istchee Baie-James, Nord-du-Québec, Quebec
  - coordinates: 50°08′32″N 74°15′11″W
  - elevation: 368 m (1,207 ft)
- Length: 21.1 km (13.1 mi)

The Mistago River is a tributary of the Barlow River (Chibougamau River), flowing into the Regional County Municipality (MRC) of Eeyou Istchee Baie-James, in Jamésie, in the administrative region of Nord-du-Québec, in the province of Quebec, at Canada.

The course of the river flows into Plamondon Township, Richardson Township and Blaiklock Township. This river flows into the Mistissini (Cree village municipality), into the Albanel Lakes Wildlife Reserve, Mistassini and Mistago and into the Assinica Wildlife Sanctuary.

The hydrographic slope of the Mistago River is accessible by a forest road (North–south direction) which cuts the river and connects to route 167 south-west of Waconichi Lake; the latter road comes from Chibougamau, going north-east along the southeast shore of Waconichi Lake and the river of the same name.

The surface of the "Mistago River" is usually frozen from early November to mid-May, however traffic Ice safety is usually from mid-November to mid-April.

== Geography ==
The main hydrographic slopes near the "Mistago River" are:
- North side: Mistassini Lake (Penicouane Bay), Rupert River, Saint-Urcisse River;
- East side: Barlow River (Chibougamau River), Waconichi Lake, Waconichi River;
- South side: Chébistuane River, Chibougamau River, Chibougamau Lake, Lac aux Dorés;
- West side: Barlow River (Chibougamau River), Chibougamau River, Blaiklock River, Lac du Sauvage, Brock River (Chibougamau River).

The "Mistago River" originates at the mouth of an unidentified lake (length: 0.4 kilometres (0.25 mi); 419 metres (1,375 ft)) in the Mistissini (Cree village municipality). This source is located at:

- 4.4 kilometres (2.7 mi) Southeast of Penicouane Bay of Mistassini Lake;
- 17.0 kilometres (10.6 mi) Northeast from the mouth of the Mistago River (confluence with the Barlow River (Chibougamau River));
- 14.2 kilometres (8.8 mi) Northwest of Waconichi Lake;
- 17.4 kilometres (10.8 mi) Southwest of Mistassini Lake;
- 75.3 kilometres (46.8 mi) Northeast of the village center of Chapais, Quebec;
- 43.5 kilometres (27.0 mi) North of downtown Chibougamau;
- 146.7 kilometres (91.2 mi) in the Northeast of the mouth of Chibougamau River (confluence with Opawica River).

The Mistago River flows on the North shore of the Barlow River (Chibougamau River). The latter flows towards the Southwest and flows into a river bend on the north shore of the Chibougamau River in a marsh area upstream of Chevrillon Lake. From there, the current flows towards the South-West by borrowing the Chibougamau River, until its confluence with the Opawica River. From this confluence, the current flows generally to the southwest by the Waswanipi River to the east shore of Goéland Lake (Waswanipi River). The latter is crossed to the northwest by the Waswanipi River which is a tributary of Matagami Lake.

The mouth of the "Mistago River" located at:

- 11.3 kilometres (7.0 mi) Northwest of Mistassini Lake;
- 12.9 kilometres (8.0 mi) Northeast of the mouth of the Barlow River (Chibougamau River);
- 133.1 kilometres (82.7 mi) Northeast of the mouth of the Chibougamau River (confluence with the Opawica River;
- 353 kilometres (219 mi) Southeast of the mouth of the Nottaway River;
- 57.6 kilometres (35.8 mi) Northeast of the village center of Chapais, Quebec;
- 26.2 kilometres (16.3 mi) North of downtown Chibougamau.

== Toponymy ==
Of Cree origin, this hydronym means "the White River".

The toponym "Mistago River" was formalized on December 5, 1968, at the Commission de toponymie du Québec, that is to say, the foundation of this commission.

== See also ==
- James Bay
- Rupert Bay
- Nottaway River, a watercourse
- Matagami Lake, a body of water
- Waswanipi River, a watercourse
- Goéland Lake (Waswanipi River), a body of water
- Chibougamau River, a watercourse
- Barlow River (Chibougamau River), a watercourse
- Assinica Wildlife Sanctuary
- Albanel, Mistassini and Mistago Lakes Wildlife Sanctuary
- List of rivers of Quebec
