= Vimont Lake =

Lake in Lac-Ashuapmushuan, Quebec, Canada

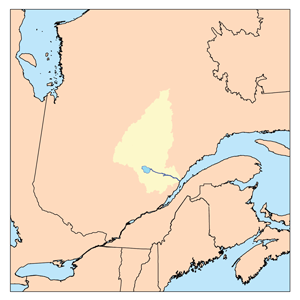
- Watershed of Saguenay River

- Location within Quebec
- Location: Eeyou Istchee Baie-James (municipality) (RCM)
- Coordinates: 49°42′09″N 73°55′41″W
- Type: Natural
- Primary inflows: Outlet (from South) of lakes Sténo, Euryoie, Moisie, Accroupi, Épi, Pego, Lupien, de l’Abri, Agnès and Obus; outlet (from North) of lakes Arabe, Méras and Dumais.
- Primary outflows: Outlet of Vimont Lake, flowing to Boisvert River (Normandin River).
- Basin countries: Canada
- Max. length: 9.4 kilometres (5.8 mi)
- Max. width: 3.7 kilometres (2.3 mi)
- Surface area: 12.12 kilometres (7.53 mi)
- Surface elevation: 413 metres (1,355 ft)

The Vimont Lake is a freshwater body of the Lac-Ashuapmushuan, Quebec unorganized territory in the northwestern part of the Regional County Municipality (MRC) Le Domaine-du-Roy, in the administrative region of Saguenay-Lac-Saint-Jean, in province of Quebec, in Canada. This lake extends almost entirely in the canton of Vimont, except the northern part Rinfret.

Forestry is the main economic activity of the sector. Recreational tourism activities come second.

A forest road serves the eastern part of the lake; road R0210 (North-South direction) serves the western part from the South where it connects to the forest road Route 167 connecting Chibougamau to Saint-Félicien, Quebec. The Canadian National Railway runs along this road.

The surface of Vimont Lake is usually frozen from early November to mid-May, however, safe ice circulation is generally from mid-November to mid-April.

== Geography ==
Vimont Lake has a length of 9.4 kilometres (5.8 mi), a maximum width of 3.7 kilometres (2.3 mi) and an altitude of 413 metres (1,355 ft). The southern part of the lake includes an island archipelago.

The mouth of Lake Vimont is located at:

- 5.3 kilometres (3.3 mi) east of the mouth of the Vimont Lake outlet;
- 22.7 kilometres (14.1 mi) north-east of the mouth of Boisvert Lake (Normandin River) (confluence with Charron Lake (Normandin River));
- 39.9 kilometres (24.8 mi) north of the mouth of Nicabau Lake (which is crossed by the Normandin River);
- 56.1 kilometres (34.9 mi) northwest of the mouth of the Normandin River (confluence with Ashuapmushuan Lake);
- 165 kilometres (103 mi) northwest of the mouth of the Ashuapmushuan River (confluence with lac Saint-Jean);
- 199 kilometres (124 mi) northwest of the mouth of lac Saint-Jean (confluence with the Saguenay River).

The main hydrographic slopes near Lake Vimont are:

- North side: Boisvert River (Normandin River), Hogan River, Waconichi Lake, Mistassini Lake;
- East side: Barthelemy Lake, Dobleau River, Chief River, Nestaocano River, Ashuapmushuan River;
- South side: Chaudière River (Normandin River), Lac de l'Aventure, Chaudière Lake, Atouk Creek, Normandin River, Aigremont Lake;
- West side: Boisvert River (Normandin River), Armitage River, Chibougamau Lake, Énard River.

Vimont Lake empties into a bay on the west shore where the current flows westward to the southeastern shore of Rubens Lake, which the current flows through on 0.4 kilometres (0.25 mi) West up to the South-East shore of lac Rubens that the current crosses on 1.9 kilometres (1.2 mi) to the North. From there, the current flows over 7.8 kilometres (4.8 mi) first to the southwest, then west to the Pulley Lake which is crossed by the current of the Boisvert River (Normandin River).

From there, the current flows 41.9 kilometres (26.0 mi), first towards the West, then towards the South, until Charron Lake (Normandin River) that the current crosses on 4.3 kilometres (2.7 mi) to its mouth located at the bridge route 167.

From this road bridge, the current flows through “Lac la Blanche” on 7.4 kilometres (4.6 mi), Jordan Lake on 9.8 kilometres (6.1 mi) and Nicabau Lake on 9.7 kilometres (6.0 mi) to the dam at its mouth. From there, the current flows south-east along the Normandin River on 38.7 kilometres (24.0 mi) to the northwestern shore of Ashuapmushuan Lake. Then, the current flows through the Ashuapmushuan River which flows to Saint-Félicien, Quebec on the west shore of Lac Saint-Jean.

== Toponymy ==
This hydronym is linked to the name of the township of Vimont.

These place names evoke the work of life of the Jesuit priest Barthélemy Vimont (Lisieux, France, 1594 - Vannes, France, 1667). Coming to New France in 1629, he was first assigned as a chaplain to a garrison near Cape Breton in 1629, where he had to stop because of the sinking of Captain Charles Daniel's ship. In 1630 he was recalled to France because of the occupation of Quebec by the Kirke brothers. He returns to Quebec in the company of Jesuit fathers Pierre-Joseph-Marie Chaumonot and Joseph Antoine Poncet de la Rivière, of Marie Guyart said Marie de l'Incarnation and Marie-Madeleine Chauvigny de La Peltrie, August 1, 1639. Superior General of the Jesuits (1639-1645), the father Vimont attends the foundation of Montreal of Paul Chomedey de Maisonneuve which he describes in the 1642 relationship.

After a stay in France, from 1645 to 1648, he returned to Québec where he worked there his ministry, as well as in the surrounding parishes until 1659. He left New France for France where he died eight years later.,

The toponym "Lac Vimont" was formalized on December 5, 1968, by the Commission de toponymie du Québec.

== See also ==
- Lac Saint-Jean, a body of water
- Ashuapmushuan River, a watercourse
- Ashuapmushuan Lake, a body of water
- Normandin River, a watercourse
- Nicabau Lake, a body of water
- Charron Lake (Normandin River)
- Le Domaine-du-Roy, a regional county municipality (MRC)
- Lac-Ashuapmushuan, Quebec, an unorganized territory
- List of lakes in Canada
