= France River =

France
- Watershed of Nottaway River

Location
- Country: Canada
- Province: Quebec
- Region: Nord-du-Québec

Physical characteristics
- Source: Unidentified lake
  - location: Eeyou Istchee Baie-James, Nord-du-Québec, Quebec
  - coordinates: 50°08′04″N 73°52′56″W
  - elevation: 424 m (1,391 ft)
- Mouth: Chibougamau Lake
  - location: Chibougamau, Nord-du-Québec, Quebec
  - coordinates: 49°58′58″N 74°06′13″W
  - elevation: 379 m (1,243 ft)
- Length: 32.2 km (20.0 mi)

Basin features
- Tributaries
  - left: Discharge of Ida Lake (via France Lake)
  - right: (in upstream order); Discharge of a set of lakes including: Michaux, Lévesque, Lavoie Lepage, Lefebvre and Courtois.

The France River is a tributary of Chibougamau Lake, flowing into the Regional County Municipality (RCM) of Eeyou Istchee Baie-James and in the city of Chibougamau, in Jamésie, in the administrative region of Nord-du-Québec, in the province of Quebec, in Canada.

The course of the river flows into the townships of Bignell, McCorkill and Roy.

The hydrographic slope of the "France River" is accessible by the junction of a forest road (East-West direction) serving the north side of Chibougamau Lake; the latter is connected to route 167 which also serves the south side of Waconichi Lake and the Waconichi River. This last road comes from Chibougamau, going north-east to the south-eastern part of Mistassini Lake.

The surface of the "France River" is usually frozen from early November to mid-May, however traffic Ice safety is usually from mid-November to mid-April.

== Geography ==
The main hydrographic slopes near the "France River" are:
- North side: Waconichi Lake, Mistassini Lake ("baie du Poste"), Pipounichouane River;
- East side: Nepton River, Nepton River North, Boisvert River, Chief River;
- South side: Nepton River, Nepton River North, Chibougamau Lake, Boisvert River, Armitage River;
- West side: Natevier River, Chibougamau River, Blondeau River (Chibougamau Lake), Oreille River.

The "France River" originates from an unidentified lake (elevation: 424 metres (1,391 ft)) in the canton of Bignell. This source is located at:

- 23.0 kilometres (14.3 mi) north-east of the mouth of the France River (confluence with the Chibougamau River);
- 4.2 kilometres (2.6 mi) south-east of Waconichi Lake;
- 13.4 kilometres (8.3 mi) south of Mistassini Lake;
- 79.4 kilometres (49.3 mi) north-east of the village center of Chapais, Quebec;
- 42.7 kilometres (26.5 mi) north-east of downtown Chibougamau;
- 156.8 kilometres (97.4 mi) north-east of the mouth of the Chibougamau River (confluence with the Opawica River);
- 379 kilometres (235 mi) east of the mouth of the Nottaway River.

From its source (unidentified lake), the France River flows over 32.2 kilometres (20.0 mi) generally towards the Southwest, according to the following segments:

Upper part of the river France (segment of 16.1 kilometres (10.0 mi))

- 3.1 kilometres (1.9 mi) southerly crossing on lake Cesia (elevation: 419 metres (1,375 ft)), to its mouth;
- 3.4 kilometres (2.1 mi) southwesterly crossing on an unidentified lake 3.2 kilometres (2.0 mi) (length: 5.3 kilometres (3.3 mi); altitude: 417 metres (1,368 ft) to its mouth;
- 1.3 kilometres (0.81 mi) to the south, crossing the western part of Lake Éva on 0.9 kilometres (0.56 mi) (length: 5.0 kilometres (3.1 mi); altitude: 414 metres (1,358 ft) to its mouth;
- 8.3 kilometres (5.2 mi) to the south, crossing on Lake France (length: 7.7 kilometres (4.8 mi); altitude: 412 metres (1,352 ft) to its mouth Note: The boundaries of McCorkill and Bignell Townships are at the entrance of the bay at the mouth of the lake;

Lower part of the river France (segment of 16.1 kilometres (10.0 mi))

- 3.8 kilometres (2.4 mi) southwesterly in McCorkill township, to the limit of the town of Chibougamau;
- 3.5 kilometres (2.2 mi) southwesterly in the town of Chibougamau, cutting the branch of a forest road to the eastern limit of the township of Roy;
- 8.8 kilometres (5.5 mi) westward in the township of Roy winding, collecting the dump (coming from the North-East) of a set of lakes (in particular: Michaux, Lévesque, Lavoie Lepage, Lefebvre and Courtois) and forming a hook to the north at the end of the segment, to its mouth.

The France River flows on the northeast shore of "Baie des Rapides" which is an extension of McKenzie Bay, north-east of Chibougamau Lake. From this mouth, the current crosses this bay to the southwest, takes the McKenzie Pass, which is crossed by a road bridge, before crossing it to the southwest on Chibougamau Lake bypassing the island of Portage. Chibougamau Lake is the main head lake of Chibougamau River.

From the mouth of Chibougamau Lake, the current crosses the Lac aux Dorés, then descends generally to the southwest (except the large S of the upper part of the river) by taking the Chibougamau River, to its confluence with the Opawica River. From this confluence, the current flows generally southwesterly through the Waswanipi River to the east shore of Goéland Lake (Waswanipi River). The latter is crossed to the northwest by the Waswanipi River which is a tributary of Matagami Lake. Finally, the current flows along the Nottaway River and empties into Rupert Bay, south of James Bay.

The mouth of the "France River" located at:

- 5.4 kilometres (3.4 mi) south-east of Waconichi Lake;
- 35.4 kilometres (22.0 mi) south of Mistassini Lake;
- 13.7 kilometres (8.5 mi) north-east of the mouth of Chibougamau Lake;
- 47.2 kilometres (29.3 mi) north-east of the mouth of the Chibougamau River (confluence with the Opawica River;
- 371 kilometres (231 mi) south-east of the mouth of the Nottaway River;
- 58.0 kilometres (36.0 mi) north-east of the village center of Chapais, Quebec;
- 21.0 kilometres (13.0 mi) north-east of downtown Chibougamau.

== Toponymy ==
The toponym "rivière France" was made official on December 5, 1968, at the Commission de toponymie du Québec, i.e. at the founding of this commission.

== See also ==
- James Bay
- Rupert Bay
- Nottaway River, a watercourse
- Matagami Lake, a body of water
- Waswanipi River, a watercourse
- Goéland Lake (Waswanipi River), a body of water
- Chibougamau River, a watercourse
- Chibougamau River, a body of water
- Chibougamau, a city
- Eeyou Istchee Baie-James, a territory equivalent to a Regional County Municipality (MRC)
- List of rivers of Quebec
