= Hogan River =

Hogan
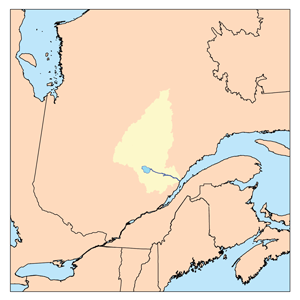
- Watershed of Saguenay River

Location
- Country: Canada
- Province: Quebec
- Region: Saguenay-Lac-Saint-Jean

Physical characteristics
- Source: Hogan lake
  - location: Lac-Ashuapmushuan, Quebec, Le Domaine-du-Roy (RCM), Saguenay-Lac-Saint-Jean, Quebec
  - coordinates: 49°54′36″N 73°46′58″W
  - elevation: 453 m (1,486 ft)
- Mouth: Aiglon Lake
  - location: Lac-Ashuapmushuan, Quebec, Le Domaine-du-Roy (RCM), Saguenay-Lac-Saint-Jean, Quebec
  - coordinates: 49°49′37″N 73°52′57″W
  - elevation: 408 m (1,339 ft)
- Length: 18.0 km (11.2 mi)

Basin features
- Tributaries
  - left: (upstream); outlet of lake Nabos.
  - right: (upstream); outlet of lakes du Joueur and Breteau.

The Hogan River is a tributary of the Boisvert River (Normandin River), flowing into the unorganized territory of the Lac-Ashuapmushuan, Quebec, in the Regional County Municipality (RCM) of Le Domaine-du-Roy, in the administrative region of Saguenay-Lac-Saint-Jean, in Quebec, in Canada.

This river crosses successively the cantons of Sarrasin and Rinfret. Forestry is the main economic activity of this valley; recreational tourism activities, second.

The forest Road R1004 (heading northeast) that connects to route 167 serves the northwestern part of the Boisvert River (Normandin River) Valley (Normandin River) and the eastern part of the Armitage River. Forest Road R0210 (North–south direction) serves the eastern part of the Boisvert River (Normandin River) Valley and the southern Hogan River Valley.

The surface of the Hogan River is usually frozen from early November to mid-May, however, safe ice movement is generally from mid-November to mid-April.

== Geography ==
The adjacent hydrographic slopes of the Hogan River are:
- north side: Chonard River, Nepton River North, Waconichi Lake, Mistassini Lake;
- east side: Chonard River, Chief's River, L’Épervier River, Petite Meule River;
- south side: Boisvert Lake (Normandin River), Épervier River, Vimont Lake, Normandin River, Dobleau River;
- west side: Armitage River, Énard River, Chibougamau Lake.

The Hogan River originates at the mouth of Hogan Lake (length: 1.5 kilometres (0.93 mi), elevation: 453 metres (1,486 ft)) located near the northwestern boundary of the Township of Saracen.

This head lake is located at 0.9 kilometres (0.56 mi) south-west of a mountain peak of 560 metres (1,840 ft). The mouth of this head lake is located at:

- 35.2 kilometres (21.9 mi) south-east of Waconichi Lake;
- 40.4 kilometres (25.1 mi) south-east of Baie du Poste, south of Mistassini Lake;
- 23.3 kilometres (14.5 mi) northeast of a bay in Chibougamau Lake;
- 48.8 kilometres (30.3 mi) north-east of downtown Chibougamau;
- 11.7 kilometres (7.3 mi) north-east of the mouth of the Hogan River (confluence with Lake Aiglon);
- 65.7 kilometres (40.8 mi) north of the mouth of Nicabau Lake whose southern part is crossed by the Normandin River;
- 49.2 kilometres (30.6 mi) north-east of the mouth of the Boisvert River (Normandin River) (confluence with Charron Lake).

From the mouth of the head lake, the Hogan River flows over 18.0 kilometres (11.2 mi) according to the following segments:

- 2.8 kilometres (1.7 mi) southwesterly in Sarrasin township across Consol Lake (length: 1.1 kilometres (0.68 mi); altitude: 444 metres (1,457 ft)), to the eastern limit of the canton of Rinfret;
- 2.4 kilometres (1.5 mi) towards the Southwest in the canton of Rinfret crossing the lakes of Sylvain (length: 2.1 kilometres (1.3 mi); altitude: 432 metres (1,417 ft)), to its mouth;
- 6.5 kilometres (4.0 mi) towards the South-West crossing the Sylvain lake (length: 2.6 kilometres (1.6 mi); altitude: 430 metres (1,410 ft)) constituted by an enlargement from the river to the outlet of Lake Nabos (coming from the South);
- 6.3 kilometres (3.9 mi) west, forming a large S, to the mouth of the river.

The Hogan River flows into a bay on the southeastern shore of Lake Aiglon (length: 3.3 kilometres (2.1 mi) altitude: 408 metres (1,339 ft)) which is crossed on the Southwest by the current of the Boisvert River (Normandin River)]. From there, the stream descends the Boisvert River (Normandin River) and enters the Ashuapmushuan Wildlife Reserve, as far as the North Shore of Charron Lake which the current flows through.

Then, the current flows through Lac la Blanche on 7.4 kilometres (4.6 mi), Lake Jordan on 9.8 kilometres (6.1 mi) and Nicabau Lake on 9.7 kilometres (6.0 mi) to the dam at its mouth. From there, the current flows south-east along the Normandin River on 38.7 kilometres (24.0 mi) to the northwestern shore of Ashuapmushuan Lake. Then the current flows through the Ashuapmushuan River which flows to Saint-Félicien, Quebec on the West shore of Lac Saint-Jean.

The confluence of the Hogan River with Lake Aiglon is located at:

- 37.6 kilometres (23.4 mi) north of the mouth of the Boisvert River (Normandin River);
- 13.0 kilometres (8.1 mi) of a bay on the east shore of Chibougamau Lake;
- 55.0 kilometres (34.2 mi) north of the mouth of Nicabau Lake whose southern portion is crossed by the Normandin River;
- 68.2 kilometres (42.4 mi) northwest of the mouth of the Normandin River (confluence with Ashuapmushuan Lake);
- 154.3 kilometres (95.9 mi) northwest of the mouth of the Ashuapmushuan River (confluence with lac Saint-Jean).

== Toponymy ==
The term "Hogan" is a family name of English origin.

The toponym "Hogan River" was formalized on March 28, 1972, at the Commission de toponymie du Québec, when it was created.

== See also ==
- Estuary of Saint Lawrence
- Saguenay River
- Lac Saint-Jean, a body of water
- Ashuapmushuan River, a watercourse
- Ashuapmushuan Lake, a body of water
- Normandin River, a watercourse
- Boisvert River (Normandin River), a watercourse
- Ashuapmushuan Wildlife Reserve, a protected area
- Lac-Ashuapmushuan, Quebec, an unorganized territory
- Le Domaine-du-Roy, a regional county municipality (MRC)
- List of rivers of Quebec
