= Chébistuane River =

Chébistuane
- Watershed of Nottaway River

Location
- Country: Canada
- Province: Quebec
- Region: Nord-du-Québec

Physical characteristics
- Source: Sirois Lake
  - location: Eeyou Istchee Baie-James, Nord-du-Québec, Quebec
  - coordinates: 50°03′17″N 74°13′53″W
  - elevation: 389 m (1,276 ft)
- Mouth: Chibougamau River
  - location: Eeyou Istchee Baie-James, Nord-du-Québec, Quebec
  - coordinates: 50°06′22″N 74°21′19″W
  - elevation: 363 m (1,191 ft)

The Chebistuane River is a tributary of the Barlow River (Chibougamau River), flowing into the Regional County Municipality (RCM) of Eeyou Istchee Baie-James, in Jamésie, in the administrative region of Nord-du-Québec, in the province of Quebec, in Canada.

The course of the river successively crosses the townships of Richardson and Blaiklock. This river is also located in the Lakes Albanel, Mistassini and Waconichi Wildlife Sanctuary.

The hydrographic slope of the Chébistuane River is accessible by a forest road from Chibougamau, going up north and cutting the river.

The surface of the Chébistuane River is usually frozen from early November to mid-May; however, safe ice circulation is generally from mid-November to mid-April.

== Geography ==
The main hydrographic slopes near the "Chébistuane river" are:
- North side: Barlow River (Chibougamau River), Mistago River, Blaiklock River, Mistassini Lake;
- East side: Waconichi Lake, Natevier River, France River, Mistassini Lake, Chibougamau Lake;
- South side: Natevier River, Waconichi Lake, McKenzie Pass, Chibougamau River, Chibougamau Lake;
- West side: Chevrillon Lake, Lac du Sauvage, Chibougamau River, Barlow River (Chibougamau River).

The Chébistuane River originates at the mouth of Lake Sirois (length: 0.5 kilometres (0.31 mi), altitude: 389 metres (1,276 ft)) in Richardson Township. This source is located at:

- 0.9 kilometres (0.56 mi) Northwest of a small bay of Waconichi Lake;
- 33.7 kilometres (20.9 mi) Southeast of a bay on the south shore of Mistassini Lake;
- 10.9 kilometres (6.8 mi) Southeast of the mouth of the Chébistuane River (confluence with the Barlow River (Chibougamau River));
- 130.1 kilometres (80.8 mi) Northeast of the mouth of the Chibougamau River (confluence with the Opawica River);
- 194.3 kilometres (120.7 mi) Northeast of the mouth of Goéland Lake (Waswanipi River);
- 53.2 kilometres (33.1 mi) Northeast of the village center of Chapais, Quebec;
- 18.9 kilometres (11.7 mi) Northeast of downtown Chibougamau;
- 359 kilometres (223 mi) East of the mouth of the Nottaway River.

From its source, the Chébistuane River flows over 30.7 kilometres (19.1 mi) according to the following segments:

- 3.8 kilometres (2.4 mi) northeasterly marking the northern boundary of a swamp area to a stream (from the northeast);
- 4.0 kilometres (2.5 mi) westerly passing the north side of a mountain whose summit reaches 513 metres (1,683 ft) to the eastern limit of Blaiklock Township;
- 6.4 kilometres (4.0 mi) southwesterly forming a northward curve to the bridge of a forest road;
- 8.2 kilometres (5.1 mi) to the northwest, forming many small streamers in marsh areas, to a creek (from the east);
- 8.3 kilometres (5.2 mi) northwesterly winding through the marsh zone to its mouth.

The Chébistuane River flows into a river bend on the North shore of the Chibougamau River in a marsh area upstream of Chevrillon Lake. From there, the current flows towards the South-West by borrowing the Chibougamau River. From the mouth of the river, the current flows generally southwestward through the Waswanipi River to the eastern shore of Goéland Lake (Waswanipi River). The latter is crossed to the northwest by the Waswanipi River which is a tributary of Matagami Lake.

The mouth of the Chébistuane River is located at:

- 11.7 kilometres (7.3 mi) west of a bay Waconichi Lake;
- 22.1 kilometres (13.7 mi) northwest of a bay in the northern part of Chibougamau Lake;
- 124.4 kilometres (77.3 mi) North of the mouth of the Chibougamau River (confluence with the Opawica River);
- 185.9 kilometres (115.5 mi) Northeast of the mouth of Goéland Lake (Waswanipi River);
- 50.4 kilometres (31.3 mi) northeast of the village center of Chapais, Quebec;
- 21.5 kilometres (13.4 mi) North of downtown Chibougamau.

== Toponymy ==
The place name "Chébistuane River" was made official on December 5, 1968, at the Commission de toponymie du Québec, i.e. at the creation of this commission

== See also ==
- James Bay
- Rupert Bay
- Nottaway River, a watercourse
- Matagami Lake, a body of water
- Waswanipi River, a watercourse
- Goéland Lake (Waswanipi River), a body of water
- Lake Waswanipi, a body of water
- Chibougamau River, a watercourse
- Barlow River (Chibougamau River), a watercourse
- Lakes Albanel, Mistassini and Waconichi Wildlife Sanctuary
- List of rivers of Quebec
