= Bouteroue Creek =

Bouteroue
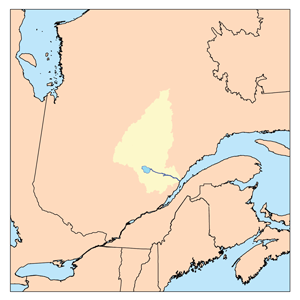
- Watershed of Saguenay River

Location
- Country: Canada
- Province: Quebec
- Region: Saguenay-Lac-Saint-Jean

Physical characteristics
- Source: Bouteroue Lake
  - location: Lac-Ashuapmushuan, Quebec, Le Domaine-du-Roy (RCM), Saguenay-Lac-Saint-Jean, Quebec
  - coordinates: 49°16′56″N 74°08′55″W
  - elevation: 390 m (1,280 ft)
- Mouth: Nicabau Lake
  - location: Lac-Ashuapmushuan, Quebec, Le Domaine-du-Roy (RCM), Saguenay-Lac-Saint-Jean, Quebec
  - coordinates: 49°24′36″N 74°07′28″W
  - elevation: 388 m (1,273 ft)
- Length: 7.4 km (4.6 mi)

The Bouteroue Creek is a tributary of Lake Nicabau, flowing into the unorganized territory of Lac-Ashuapmushuan, Quebec into the Regional County Municipality (RCM) of Le Domaine-du-Roy, in the Saguenay-Lac-Saint-Jean administrative region, in Quebec, in Canada.

Bouteroue Creek flows entirely in the canton of Bouteroue. Its mouth is located at 0.5 kilometres (0.31 mi) west of the Ashuapmushuan Wildlife Reserve boundary. Forestry is the main economic activity of this valley; recreational tourism activities, second.

The route 167 between Chibougamau and Saint-Félicien, Quebec passes on the east side of Nicabau Lake. The Canadian National Railway runs along this road.

The surface of Bouteroue Creek is usually frozen from early November to mid-May, however, safe ice movement is generally from mid-November to mid-April.

== Geography ==
The adjacent hydrographic slopes of Bouteroue Creek are:
- north side: Bouteroue Lake, Nicabau Lake, Charron Lake (Normandin River), Normandin River, Coquille River (Normandin River), Boisvert River (Normandin River);
- east side: Normandin River, Marquette River;
- south side: Poutrincourt Lake, Normandin River, Finbar Lake, Milieu River (Normandin River);
- west side: Bouteroue Lake, Rohault Lake, Gabriel Lake (Opawica River).

Bouteroue Creek originates at the mouth of Bouteroue Lake (length: 16.9 kilometres (10.5 mi), altitude: 402 metres (1,319 ft)) located in the township of Bouteroue. The mouth of this head lake is located at:

- 13.1 kilometres (8.1 mi) south-east of the mouth of Rohault Lake (confluence with Bouteroue Lake);
- 5.3 kilometres (3.3 mi) south of the mouth of Bouteroue Creek (confluence with Nicabau Lake);
- 8.9 kilometres (5.5 mi) south of the mouth of Nicabau Lake whose southern portion is crossed by the Normandin River;
- 27.0 kilometres (16.8 mi) west of the mouth of the Normandin River (confluence with Ashuapmushuan Lake.

From the mouth of Bouteroue Lake, Bouteroue Creek flows over 7.4 kilometres (4.6 mi) through marsh areas.

Bouteroue Creek flows into a bay on the south shore of Nicabau Lake (length: 9.7 kilometres (6.0 mi); maximum width: 3.0 kilometres (1.9 mi); 386 metres (1,266 ft)) which is crossed on 5.3 kilometres (3.3 mi) to the North, then to the East, by the current of the Normandin River. From there, the current flows down the Normandin River to the southeast on 38.7 kilometres (24.0 mi), to the shore Northwest of Ashuapmushuan Lake. Then, the current flows through the Ashuapmushuan River which flows to Saint-Félicien, Quebec on the west shore of Lac Saint-Jean.

The confluence of Bouteroue Creek with the Nicabau Lake is located at:

- 11.9 kilometres (7.4 mi) north of the mouth of Poutrincourt Lake;
- 10.2 kilometres (6.3 mi) South of the mouth of Rohault Lake;
- 4.0 kilometres (2.5 mi) south-west of the mouth of Nicabau Lake whose southern portion is crossed by the Normandin River;
- 27.2 kilometres (16.9 mi) northwest of the mouth of the Normandin River (confluence with Ashuapmushuan Lake);
- 150 kilometres (93 mi) northwest of the mouth of the Ashuapmushuan River (confluence with lac Saint-Jean).

== Toponymy ==
The toponym "ruisseau Bouteroue" was formalized on March 28, 1972, at the Commission de toponymie du Québec.

== See also ==
- Estuary of Saint Lawrence
- Saguenay River
- Lac Saint-Jean, a body of water
- Ashuapmushuan River, a watercourse
- Ashuapmushuan Lake, a body of water
- Normandin River, a watercourse
- Nicabau Lake, a body of water
- Ashuapmushuan Wildlife Reserve, a protected area
- Lac-Ashuapmushuan, Quebec, an unorganized territory
- Le Domaine-du-Roy, a regional county municipality (MRC)
- List of rivers of Quebec
