= Nepton River North =

Nepton North
- Watershed of Nottaway River

Location
- Country: Canada
- Province: Quebec
- Region: Nord-du-Québec

Physical characteristics
- Source: Unidentified lake
  - location: Eeyou Istchee James Bay, Nord-du-Québec, Quebec, Canada
  - coordinates: 49°59′50″N 73°52′14″W
  - elevation: 499 m (1,637 ft)
- Mouth: Nepton River (Chibougamau Lake)
  - location: Eeyou Istchee James Bay, Nord-du-Québec, Quebec
  - coordinates: 49°57′37″N 73°55′02″W
  - elevation: 423 m (1,388 ft)
- Length: 6.4 km (4.0 mi)

The Nepton River North is a tributary of the Nepton River (Chibougamau Lake), flowing into the Municipality of Eeyou Istchee Baie-James, in Jamésie, in the administrative region of Nord-du-Québec, in the province of Quebec, to Canada.

The course of the river flows entirely into McCorkill Township.

The hydrographic slope of the "Nepton River North" is accessible by a forest road serving the eastern side of Chibougamau Lake; this the last is connected by the North to route 167 which also serves the south side of Waconichi Lake and the Waconichi River. This last road comes from Chibougamau, going north-east to the south-eastern part of Mistassini Lake.

The surface of the "Nepton North River" is usually frozen from early November to mid-May, however, safe ice circulation is usually from mid-November to mid-April.

== Geography ==
The main hydrographic slopes adjacent to the "Nepton River North" are:
- North side: Ida Lake, Eva Lake, Waconichi Lake, Waconichi River, Mistassini Lake (“Baie du Poste”), Perche River;
- East side: Chef River, Petite Meule River, Nestaocano River;
- South side: Boisvert River, Hogan River, Épervier River;
- West side: Nepton River (Chibougamau Lake), France River, Natevier River, Chibougamau Lake, Chibougamau River.

The "Nepton North River" originates at the mouth of an unidentified lake (length: 0.8 kilometres (0.50 mi) altitude: 499 metres (1,637 ft)) in the township from McCorkill. This lake is located northwest of a mountain with a peak of 595 metres (1,952 ft); this summit corresponds to the limit of the MRC Eeyou Istchee Baie-James (administrative region of Nord-du-Québec) and Lac-Saint-Jean-Ouest (Saguenay-Lac-Saint-Jean) This source is located at:

- 5.4 kilometres (3.4 mi) north-east of the mouth of the Nepton River (confluence with Nepton River (Chibougamau Lake));
- 17.8 kilometres (11.1 mi) south-east of Waconichi Lake;
- 27.7 kilometres (17.2 mi) south of Mistassini Lake;
- 13.5 kilometres (8.4 mi) north-east of the mouth of the Nepton River (Chibougamau Lake);
- North of downtown Chibougamau.

From its source, the Nepton North River flows over 6.4 kilometres (4.0 mi) generally to the southwest.

The Nepton North River flows into a river bend on the north shore of the Nepton River (Chibougamau Lake). The latter flows generally northwesterly to the bottom of a narrow bay on the northeastern shore of Nepton Bay which is an extension of the Bay of Islands, northeast of Chibougamau Lake and is connected to Girard Bay. From the mouth of the Nepton River, a peninsula is advancing in a straight line on the south-west in the bay to the outlet of Forest Lake. The mouth of the Nepton River is located at 0.4 kilometres (0.25 mi) east of the boundaries of Roy and McCorkill Townships.

From this mouth, the current flows over 18.3 kilometres (11.4 mi) first crossing this bay towards the West which includes many islands, in crossing west to Chibougamau Lake and bypassing Portage Island. The Chibougamau Lake is the main head lake of Chibougamau River.

From the mouth of Chibougamau Lake, the current crosses the Lac aux Dorés, then descends generally to the southwest (except the large S of the upper part of the river) by taking the Chibougamau River, to its confluence with the Opawica River. From this confluence, the current flows generally southwesterly through the Waswanipi River to the east shore of Goéland Lake (Waswanipi River). The latter is crossed to the northwest by the Waswanipi River which is a tributary of Matagami Lake. Finally, the current flows along the Nottaway River and empties into Rupert Bay, south of James Bay.

The mouth of the "Nepton River North" located at:

- 24.4 kilometres (15.2 mi) South-east of Waconichi Lake;
- 42.4 kilometres (26.3 mi) South of Mistassini Lake;
- 8.4 kilometres (5.2 mi) North-east of the mouth of the Nepton River (Chibougamau Lake);
- 22.6 kilometres (14.0 mi) North of the mouth of Chibougamau Lake;
- 161.3 kilometres (100.2 mi) North-east of the mouth of the Chibougamau River (confluence with the Opawica River);
- 397 kilometres (247 mi) South-east of the mouth of the Nottaway River;
- 90.2 kilometres (56.0 mi) North-east of the village center of Chapais, Quebec;
- 55.2 kilometres (34.3 mi) North-East of downtown Chibougamau.

== Toponymy ==
The toponym "Nepton River North" was formalized on December 5, 1968, at the Commission de toponymie du Québec, i.e. at the founding of this commission.

== See also ==
- James Bay
- Rupert Bay
- Nottaway River, a watercourse
- Matagami Lake, a body of water
- Waswanipi River, a watercourse
- Goéland Lake (Waswanipi River), a body of water
- Chibougamau River, a watercourse
- Chibougamau Lake, a body of water
- Nepton River (Chibougamau Lake), a watercourse
- Eeyou Istchee James Bay, a territory equivalent to a Regional County Municipality (MRC)
- List of rivers of Quebec
