= Albanel =

Albanel may refer to:

- Albanel, Quebec, Canada
- Lake Albanel, lake in Quebec, Canada

== People with the surname ==
- Charles Albanel (1616–1696), French missionary explorer in Canada and Jesuit priest
- Christine Albanel (born 1955), French civil servant and politician
