= Oreille =

Oreille may refer to:

- Ear (French: Oreille), the organ of hearing
- Alain Oreille (born 1953), a French Rallye driver
- Oreille River, a tributary of the Blondeau River in Quebec, Canada

== See also ==
- Pend Oreille (disambiguation)
