= Boisvert =

Boisvert (French pronunciation: [bwavɛʁ]) is a French surname. It consists of the words bois (meaning "wood") and vert (meaning "green"). As of 2006, Boisvert was the 65th most common surname in Quebec, Canada, accounting for 0,186% of the province's population. As of 2010, there were 4821 people with this surname in the United States.

Notable people with the surname include:

- Alex Boisvert-Lacroix (born 1987), Canadian speed skater
- Aurélien Boisvert (1927–2021), Canadian historian and lawyer
- Evelyne Boisvert (born 1970), Canadian diver
- Fabien Boisvert (1839–1897), Canadian politician, land surveyor and farmer
- France Boisvert (born 1959), Canadian educator and writer
- Gilles Boisvert (artist) (born 1940), Canadian artist and sculptor
- Gilles Boisvert (ice hockey) (1933–2022), Canadian ice hockey player
- Hugo Boisvert (born 1976), Canadian ice hockey coach and player
- Jean-Marie Boisvert (born 1939), Canadian politician
- Laurier J. Boisvert, former President of the Canadian Space Agency
- Lili Boisvert, Canadian journalist, columnist and author
- Maurice Boisvert (1897–1988), Canadian politician and lawyer
- Michael Boisvert (born 1973), Canadian actor and choreographer
- Michel Patrick Boisvert, Haitian civil servant and politician
- Romeo T. Boisvert (1916–1981), American politician
- Ronald Boisvert, American politician
- Sacha Boisvert (born 2006), Canadian ice hockey player
- Serge Boisvert (born 1959), Canadian ice hockey player
- Sylvie Boisvert, Canadian athlete
- Yves Boisvert (1950–2012), Canadian poet

== See also ==
- Boisvert River, Quebec
- Montréal/Boisvert & Fils Water Airport, Canadian water aerodrome in Montreal, Quebec
- Pointe-à-Boisvert, a community in Longue-Rive, Quebec
