= Nepton River (Chibougamau Lake) =

Nepton
- Watershed of Nottaway River

Location
- Country: Canada
- Province: Quebec
- Region: Nord-du-Québec

Physical characteristics
- Source: André Lake
  - location: Eeyou Istchee James Bay, Nord-du-Québec, Quebec, Unidentified lake
  - coordinates: 49°58′25″N 73°52′52″W
  - elevation: 475 m (1,558 ft)
- Mouth: Chibougamau Lake
  - location: Eeyou Istchee James Bay, Nord-du-Québec, Quebec
  - coordinates: 49°55′09″N 74°00′57″W
  - elevation: 379 m (1,243 ft)
- Length: 18.4 km (11.4 mi)

Basin features
- Tributaries
  - left: Discharge of Demers Lake
  - right: Nepton River North

The Nepton River is a tributary of Chibougamau Lake, flowing into the Municipality of Eeyou Istchee James Bay, in Jamésie, in the administrative region of Nord-du-Québec, in the province of Quebec, in Canada.

The course of the river flows entirely into McCorkill Township.

The hydrographic slope of the Nepton River is accessible by a forest road serving the eastern side of Chibougamau Lake; the latter is connected by the North to route 167 which also serves the south side of Waconichi Lake and the Waconichi River. This last road comes from Chibougamau, going north-east to the south-eastern part of Mistassini Lake.

The surface of the Nepton River is usually frozen from early November to mid-May, however, safe ice movement is generally from mid-November to mid-April.

== Geography ==
The main hydrographic slopes adjacent to the Nepton River are:
- North side: Ida Lake, Lake Éva, Waconichi Lake, Waconichi River, Mistassini Lake ("Baie du Poste"), Pipounichouane River;
- East side: Chef River, Petite Meule River, Nestaocano River;
- South side: Boisvert River, Hogan River, Épervier River;
- West side: France River, Natevier River, Chibougamau Lake, Chibougamau River.

The Nepton River originates at the mouth of an unidentified lake (length: 1.0 kilometre (0.62 mi) altitude: 475 metres (1,558 ft)) in McCorkill Township. This source is located at:

- 11.3 kilometres (7.0 mi) north-east of the mouth of the Nepton River (confluence with Chibougamau Lake);
- 18.5 kilometres (11.5 mi) south-east of Waconichi Lake;
- 30.5 kilometres (19.0 mi) south of Mistassini Lake;
- 72.6 kilometres (45.1 mi) north-east of the village center of Chapais, Quebec;
- 35.9 kilometres (22.3 mi) north-east of downtown Chibougamau;
- 153 kilometres (95 mi) north-east of the mouth of the Chibougamau River (confluence with the Opawica River);
- 386 kilometres (240 mi) east of the mouth of the Nottaway River.

From its source (Lake Andrew), the Nepton River flows over 18.4 kilometres (11.4 mi) generally to the northeast, according to the following segments:

- 1.9 kilometres (1.2 mi) southwesterly, crossing Nepton Lake (length: 1.4 kilometres (0.87 mi); altitude: 468 metres (1,535 ft));
- 2.8 kilometres (1.7 mi) westerly to the confluence of the Nepton River North (coming from the Northeast);
- 4.8 kilometres (3.0 mi) southwesterly to a forest road;
- 3.4 kilometres (2.1 mi) West, forming a hook to the South, to the outlet of Lake Demers (coming from the South);
- 5.5 kilometres (3.4 mi) southwesterly to mouth.

The Nepton River flows into a narrow bay on the northeastern shore of Nepton Bay which is an extension of the Bay of Islands, northeast of Chibougamau Lake and is connected to Girard Bay. From the mouth of the Nepton River, a peninsula advances in a straight line on the Southwest 1.4 kilometres (0.87 mi) in the bay to the outlet of the lake Forest. The mouth of the Nepton River is located at 0.4 kilometres (0.25 mi) east of the boundaries of Roy and McCorkill Townships.

From this mouth, the current flows over 18.3 kilometres (11.4 mi) first by crossing this bay towards the West which includes many islands, crossing to the west the Chibougamau Lake and bypassing Portage Island. Chibougamau Lake is the main head lake of Chibougamau River.

From the mouth of Chibougamau Lake, the current crosses the Lac aux Dorés, then descends generally to the southwest (except the large S of the upper part of the river) by taking the Chibougamau River, to its confluence with the Opawica River. From this confluence, the current flows generally to the southwest by the Waswanipi River to the east shore of Goéland Lake (Waswanipi River). The latter is crossed to the northwest by the Waswanipi River which is a tributary of Matagami Lake. Finally, the current flows along the Nottaway River and empties into Rupert Bay, south of James Bay.

The mouth of the Nepton River located at:

- 14.9 kilometres (9.3 mi) south-east of Waconichi Lake;
- 39.4 kilometres (24.5 mi) south of Mistassini Lake;
- 16.4 kilometres (10.2 mi) East of the mouth of Chibougamau Lake;
- 128.6 kilometres (79.9 mi) north-east of the mouth of the Chibougamau River (confluence with the Opawica River);
- 390 kilometres (240 mi) south-east of the mouth of the Nottaway River;
- 54.7 kilometres (34.0 mi) north-east of the village center of Chapais, Quebec;
- 24.4 kilometres (15.2 mi) east of downtown Chibougamau.

== Toponymy ==
The toponym "Nepton River" was formalized on December 5, 1968, at the Commission de toponymie du Québec, that is to say, the foundation of this commission.

== See also ==
- James Bay
- Rupert Bay
- Nottaway River, a watercourse
- Matagami Lake, a body of water
- Waswanipi River, a watercourse
- Goéland Lake (Waswanipi River), a body of water
- Chibougamau River, a watercourse
- Chibougamau Lake, a body of water
- Eeyou Istchee Baie-James, a municipality
- List of rivers of Quebec
