= Troilus (disambiguation) =

Troilus is a legendary Trojan whose fate is linked to that of Troy in the Trojan War.

Troilus may also refer to:

- Troilus of Elis (4th century BC), Greek athlete
- Troilus (philosopher), a sophist of the 4-5th century in Constantinople
- Troïlus de Mesgouez (1536–1606), a French noble (Marquis de La Roche-Helgomarche) and Viceroy of New France
- USS Troilus (AKA-46), an Artemis class attack cargo ship
- Troilus (bug), a genus of bugs in the family Pentatomidae
- 1208 Troilus, an asteroid
- Lake Troilus, a lake in Quebec
- Troilus and Cressida, a play by William Shakespeare
