= Blaiklock River =

Tributary of the Barlow River (Nottaway Slope), Nord-du-Québec, Canada

Blaiklock
- Watershed of Nottaway River

Location
- Country: Canada
- Province: Quebec
- Region: Nord-du-Québec

Physical characteristics
- Source: Forested creek
  - location: Eeyou Istchee Baie-James, Nord-du-Québec, Quebec
  - coordinates: 50°10′35″N 74°30′51″W
  - elevation: 373 m (1,224 ft)
- Mouth: Barlow River (Chibougamau River)
  - location: Eeyou Istchee Baie-James, Nord-du-Québec, Quebec
  - coordinates: 50°08′41″N 74°17′40″W
  - elevation: 366 m (1,201 ft)
- Length: 22.9 km (14.2 mi)

The Blaiklock River is a tributary of the Barlow River (Chibougamau River), flowing into the Regional County Municipality (MRC) of Eeyou Istchee Baie-James, in Jamésie, in the administrative region of Nord-du-Québec, in the province of Quebec, in Canada.

The course of the river flows in the townships of Chérisy, Beaulieu and Blaiklock. This river flows into the Albanel, Mistassini and Blaiklock Lakes Wildlife Sanctuary.

The hydrographic slope of the "Blaiklock River" is accessible by a forest road (East-West direction serving the upper part of the watercourse, which connects to another forest road (North-South direction) which cuts the river and which connects to route 167 to the southwest of Waconichi Lake. This last road comes from Chibougamau, going north-east along the shoreline. Southeast of Waconichi Lake and the river of the same name.

The surface of the "Blaiklock River" is usually frozen from early November to mid-May, however safe ice traffic is generally from mid-November to mid-April.

== Geography ==
The main hydrographic slopes adjacent to the "Blaiklock River" are:

- North side: Mistassini Lake (Penicouane Bay), Rupert River, Saint-Urcisse River;
- East side: Barlow River (Chibougamau River), Waconichi Lake, Waconichi River;
- South side: Chébistuane River, Chibougamau River, Chibougamau Lake, Lac aux Dorés;
- West side: Barlow River (Chibougamau River), Chibougamau River, Lac du Sauvage, Brock River (Chibougamau River).

The Blaiklock River originates from a forest stream (elevation: 373 metres (1,224 ft)) in Cherisy Township. This source is located at:

- 13.2 kilometres (8.2 mi) north-east of the mouth of the Blaiklock River (confluence with the Barlow River (Chibougamau River);
- 25.1 kilometres (15.6 mi) northwest of Waconichi Lake;
- 45 kilometres (28 mi) south-west of Mistassini Lake;
- 50.5 kilometres (31.4 mi) north of the village center of Chapais, Quebec;
- 30.9 kilometres (19.2 mi) north-west of downtown Chibougamau;
- 117.8 kilometres (73.2 mi) north-east of the mouth of the Chibougamau River (confluence with the Opawica River);
- 335.6 kilometres (208.5 mi) east of the mouth of the Nottaway River.

From its source, the Blaiklock River flows over 22.9 kilometres (14.2 mi) generally to the southwest, according to the following segments:

- 5.0 kilometres (3.1 mi) easterly entering the Albanel, Mistassini and Waconichi Lakes Wildlife Sanctuary, then in the township of Beaulieu, to a bend of the river;
- 11.9 kilometres (7.4 mi) eastward southward into Blaiklock Township, then southeasterly to the bridge of a forest road, corresponding to the boundary of the townships of Beaulieu and Blaiklock;
- 6.0 kilometres (3.7 mi) south-east to its mouth. Note: A forest road follows this segment.

The Blaiklock River flows on the north shore of the Barlow River (Chibougamau River). The latter flows southwest and flows into a river bend on the north shore of the Chibougamau River in a marsh area upstream of Chevrillon Lake. From there, the current flows towards the South-West by borrowing the Chibougamau River, until its confluence with the Opawica River. From this confluence, the current flows generally southwesterly through the Waswanipi River to the east shore of Goéland Lake (Waswanipi River). The latter is crossed to the northwest by the Waswanipi River which is a tributary of Matagami Lake.

The mouth of the "Blaiklock River" located at:

- 12.6 kilometres (7.8 mi) northwest of Mistassini Lake;
- 10.6 kilometres (6.6 mi) north-east of the mouth of the Barlow River (Chibougamau River);
- 130.5 kilometres (81.1 mi) north-east of the mouth of the Chibougamau River (confluence with the Opawica River;
- 351.4 kilometres (218.3 mi) south-east of the mouth of the Nottaway River;
- 56.3 kilometres (35.0 mi) north-east of the village center of Chapais, Quebec;
- 26.1 kilometres (16.2 mi) North of downtown Chibougamau.

== Toponymy ==
This hydronym uses the same name as the township of Blaiklock. This term evokes the memory of Frederic William Blaiklock (1822-1901), surveyor, native of Quebec (city). He was the first to conduct topographic measurements in the valley of the Ashuapmushuan River which is located north of Lac Saint-Jean. He also mapped out the two provincial roads leading to Lac Saint-Jean, via Stoneham and via La Tuque. From 1850 to 1853, he surveyed the territorial boundaries between Canada and New Brunswick. For 23 years (1878-1901), he was in charge of the Cadastre Office at Montreal. The Geography Commission, the current Commission de toponymie du Québec, approved this place name in 1953.

The toponym "Blaiklock River" was made official on December 5, 1968, at the Commission de toponymie du Québec, that is to say, the foundation of this commission.

== See also ==
- James Bay
- Rupert Bay
- Nottaway River, a watercourse
- Matagami Lake, a body of water
- Waswanipi River, a watercourse
- Goéland Lake (Waswanipi River), a body of water
- Chibougamau River, a watercourse
- Barlow River (Chibougamau River), a watercourse
- Albanel, Mistassini and Blaiklock Lakes Wildlife Sanctuary
- List of rivers of Quebec
