= Lake Albanel =

Mountain in the country of Canada

- Location in Quebec
- Location: Baie-James, Quebec
- Coordinates: 51°05′N 73°05′W
- Lake type: Natural
- Primary outflows: Rupert River
- Basin countries: Canada
- Surface area: 445 km^{2} (172 sq mi)
- Surface elevation: 389 m (1,276 ft)

Lake Albanel (French pronunciation: [albanɛl]) is located east of Lake Mistassini and covers a total area of approximately 445 square kilometres (172 sq mi). It is located in the region of Jamésie. Quebec Route 167 ends beside this lake. It is entirely located in the protected area of Lacs-Albanel-Mistassini-et-Waconichi.

== Formation theory ==
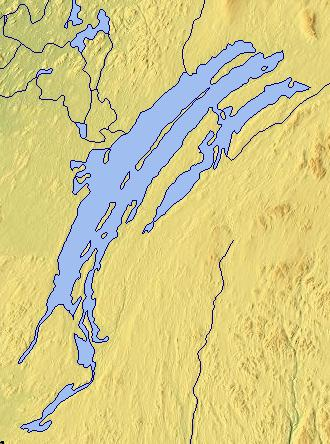
Map of Lake Albanel with larger Lake Mistassini to the west

In 2016, it was reported that the arc shaped lake, together with nearby Lake Mistassini, may have been formed by a large meteor impact about 2.1 billion years ago. The rest of the 500 km diameter crater is thought to have now been mostly eroded away or buried but geological indications of a major impact have been found in the rocks around the lake. If confirmed this would be the largest impact crater found on the earth.

== Etymology ==
Lake Albanel is named in honour of Charles Albanel who discovered it in 1671/1672.

== Geography ==
The main hydrographic slopes near Lake Albanel are:

- North side: Mistassini Lake, Chéno River, Pépeshquasati River, Neilson River (Pépeshquasati River), Wabissinane River;
- East side: Témiscamie River, Chalifour River, Perdue River (Témiscamie River), Témiscamie Lake;
- South side: Chalifour River, Nestaocano River;
- West side: Mistassini Lake, Rupert River, Wabissinane River.

== Main islands ==
Northwestern Shore (from the mouth of the lake)
- Dorval Island,
- Pauli Island,
- Rafinesque Island,
- Isle of the Sarracénie,
- Wahl Island,
- Richardson Island,
- Chicapio Island,
- Jacques-Cornut Island,

South-East Shore (from the North (no island)

Central part of the lake

- Islet of Algae,
- Island Pallier,
- Cedar Island,
- Cooper Island,

South part of the lake

- Arnaud Island,
- Île Nantais,
- Michel-Laplante Island.

== Peninsulas, caps and bays ==
North-West shore

(from the mouth of the lake)

- Fletcher Tip,
- Pointe Raphael,
- Pointe de la Doradille,
- Pointe des Génevriers,
- Jeffrey Bay,
- Myrica Point,
- Curved Aspen Bay,
- Anse La Galissonnière,

South-East Shore (from North to South)

- Lake of the Potamots
- Canso Point,
- Canso Bay,
- Esker Point,
- Lowther Bay,
- Tip of the Outcrop,
- Albanel peninsula
- Pointe Rolland-Germain,
- Chebamonkoue Peninsula,
- Presqu'ile Michel-Laure,
- Strait Opapushka,
- Iron Point,
- Black Sand Bay,

Southwest shore of the lake (from South to North, to the mouth)

- Pass Kaupach Kaachiitikwaatistanuch,
- Bay of Burning Feet,
- Mistassiniis Bay,
- Bright Wood Point,
- Pointe of Séneçons,
- Spike of the Lying Spruce,
- Pointe des Aulnaies,
- Presqu'ile of the Limestone Table,
- Pointe des Liards,
- Strait Opapushka,
- Changing Water Bay,
- Saint-Ambroise peninsula,
- Silvy Peninsula,
- Mistassini Point.

== Access roads ==
The eastern sector of Lac Mistassini (including the village of Mistissini (Cree village municipality) and the hamlet Rivière-Chalifour) is accessible from Chibougamau by route 167. This road goes north to the east shore of Albanel Lake. Some secondary forest roads connect to this main road.

== See also ==
- List of lakes of Quebec
- List of protected areas of Quebec
- Albanel, Quebec
