= Lake Troilus =

Lake in Quebec, Canada

- Location within Quebec
- Location: Baie-James, Quebec
- Coordinates: 50°53′58″N 74°33′21″W
- Basin countries: Canada
- Max. length: 28.1 kilometres (17.5 mi)
- Max. width: 3.3 kilometres (2.1 mi)
- Surface area: 52 kilometres (32 mi)
- Surface elevation: 372 metres (1,220 ft)

Lake Troïlus is of the Broadback River watershed, located in Baie-James, in the Nord-du-Québec, in the province of Quebec, Canada.

This body of water is part of the Assinica Wildlife Sanctuary. The surrounding areas are conducive to hunting and fishing.

The hydrographic slope of the Troilus is generally difficult to access, except for some forest roads for forestry and recreational tourism activities. These roads connect on the west side to a main road leading south to Chibougamau; this route passes west of Troilus Lake, straddling the strait between the main part of Troilus Lake and Moleon Bay (located to the southwest).

The surface of Troilus Lake is usually frozen from late October to early May, however safe ice movement is generally from mid-November to the end of April.

== Geography ==
The main hydrographic slopes near Lake Troilus are:

- north side: Rupert River, Natastan River, Boisfort Lake, Canotaican Lake, Avanches Lake, Swallow Lake;
- east side: Testard Lake (Broadback River), Épervanche Lake, Savignac Lake, Artaud Lake, Armagnac Lake, Saint-Urcisse Lake, Saint-Urcisse River, Lake Mistassini;
- south side: Frotet Lake, Lake Regnault, Samuel-Bédard Lake, Lemieux Lake, De Maurès River, Du Sauvage Lake, Chibougamau River;
- west side: Chatillon Lake, Chatillon River, Broadback River, Avranches Lake, Robineau Lake.

Located west of Lake Mistassini, Troilus Lake has an area of 52 square kilometres (20 sq mi). This lake has a length of 28.1 kilometres (17.5 mi), a maximum width of 3.3 kilometres (2.1 mi) and an altitude of 372 metres (1,220 ft).

This asymmetrical lake has four large deformed parts, each of which includes an archipelago, as well as numerous bays and peninsulas:

- South-West bay, stretching over a length of 8.6 kilometres (5.3 mi). This bay is fed on the west side by a discharge of seven unidentified lakes. This bay has an island with a length of 1.4 kilometres (0.87 mi);
- South-Central Bay, stretching south-west on 13.1 kilometres (8.1 mi). Note: It has a secondary bay stretching southward on 4.2 kilometres (2.6 mi). This bay receives the discharge (coming from the South-West) of the lakes [Frotet lake] and Regnault Lake, as well as the discharge of the South-West bay;
- East Bay, stretching to the northeast on 15.0 kilometres (9.3 mi), with two large peninsulas (one is oriented towards the Northeast on 2.3 kilometres (1.4 mi), the other opposite stretches 1.8 kilometres (1.1 mi) to the southwest), which almost meet, forming a strait. This bay receives two unidentified lake discharges from the northeast side and the Lake Testard (Broadback River) discharge from the south;
- North West Bay, stretching to 7.5 kilometres (4.7 mi). Note: A peninsula stretching to the southwest separates East Bay and North West Bay. This bay receives the discharge (coming from the North-East) of a set of unidentified lakes. The mouth of the lake is located on the west shore of this bay.

The mouth of Troilus Lake is located at the bottom of a bay in the north of the lake, at:

- 51.6 kilometres (32.1 mi) west of lake Mistassini;
- 78.7 kilometres (48.9 mi) south-west of the mouth of Mistassini Lake which is the head of the Rupert River;
- 68.6 kilometres (42.6 mi) northwest of the village center of Mistissini (Cree village municipality);
- 72.2 kilometres (44.9 mi) north of downtown Chibougamau;
- 155.9 kilometres (96.9 mi) north-east of the mouth of Lake Evans (Quebec);
- 300 kilometres (190 mi) East of the confluence of the Broadback River and Rupert Bay

== Toponym y ==
The toponym "Troilus lake" evokes the work of life of Troilus de La Roche de Mesgouez (around 1540–1606), viceroy "so-called Terres-Neuves". His title of lieutenant-general "of the countries of Canada, Newfoundland, Labrador and Norembegue", received in 1598, conferred him the property of the country and the monopoly of the trade. Troilus is the name of the godfather of La Roche, Troilus de Mondragon, Spanish colonel. In 1945, the Quebec Geography Commission attributed the name of Troilus to this waterbody, previously designated Lake Seven. This numeral-based designation - there was also a Lake Five, a Lake Six, and a Lake Eight - appeared on the map entitled Mistassini and was published in 1943. The Crees gave names to parts of this lake, but not to all of this complex water table. See: La Roche (Canton) and Mesgouez Lake. The toponym "Troilus Lake" was formalized on August 2, 1991, by the Commission de toponymie du Québec.

== See also ==
- Broadback River, a watercourse
- Avranches Lake, a waterbody
- Frotet Lake, a waterbody
- Regnault Lake, a waterbody
- Assinica Wild Reserve
- Baie-James, a municipality
- Liste of lakes of Quebec
