= Pend Oreille =

Pend Oreille may refer to:

- Lake Pend Oreille, the largest lake in the northern Idaho Panhandle
- Pend Oreille County, Washington, a county located in the northeastern section of the State of Washington
- Pend Oreille River, a tributary of the Columbia River
- Pend d'Oreilles tribe, an Indigenous people of the Northwest Plateau
- Pend Oreille Valley Railroad, a shortline railroad located in Usk, in northeast Washington

== See also ==
- Oreille (disambiguation)
