= Charles Albanel =

French missionary explorer and Jesuit priest (1616–1696)

- Born: 1616; Auvergne, France
- Died: 11 January 1696 (aged 79–80); Sault Ste. Marie, New France
- Occupations: Catholic priest; missionary; explorer
- Known for: First European to reach Hudson Bay from the Saint Lawrence

Charles Albanel (French pronunciation: [ʃaʁl albanɛl]; 1616 – 11 January 1696), born in Ardes or Auvergne, was a French missionary explorer in Canada, and a Jesuit priest. He was the first to travel by land to Hudson Bay from Tadoussac.

== Life ==
Charles Albanel entered the Society of Jesus in 1633 at Toulouse. In 1635 he began teaching at various Jesuit colleges, studied philosophy at Billom and theology at Tournon.

He sailed for Canada in 1649 and arrived at Quebec in late August. A month later he was sent to Ville-Marie. He wintered among the Montagnais, and in the spring traveled to Tadoussac to tend those suffering from fever.

In July 1660, on a return from Trois-Rivières with Governor Voyer d'Argenson, their boat was attacked by Iroquois. In August, René Ménard was sent west from Montreal with a trading party of Ottawa and the fur traders Radisson and Groseilliers, heading for what is now northern Wisconsin, aiming to establish a mission among the Ottawa. Albanel met Ménard at Montreal and was to accompany him, but the Ottawa objected to his Indian companion and they were not allowed to join the group. Ménard never returned. That spring Ménard had heard that a band of Hurons in the interior was starving, and he set off to minister to them. He and a fur trader nicknamed L'Esperance became separate at a portage near some rapids. Menard, weak with hunger himself, disappeared in the wilderness. His cassock and breviary were later found among the Dakotas.

Albanel became parish priest at Cap-de-la-Madeleine until August 1665, although he retained responsibility for the missions. In October 1666 Albanel served as chaplain for the Carignan-Salières Regiment in a campaign against the Mohawk. He was Superior at Sillery in 1668, but back at the Sainte-Croix mission near Tadoussac for the winter during a smallpox epidemic. Tadoussac served as his base while traveling to other infected settlements. He, too, became ill, but recovered. The following spring he headed north and received reports of English fur traders in Hudson's Bay. In June 1670 he left Tadoussac to work among the Innu of Pessamit.

In the year 1672, at the time when the Hudson's Bay Company was beginning operations, he was a leader of a French party that went by the Saguenay River, Lake Mistassini, and the Rupert River to Hudson Bay. Albanel was chosen because he knew the tribes most familiar with the route. He may have been the first European to reach Hudson Bay from the Saint Lawrence.

In 1674, on another journey to the Rupert River he was captured by the English and taken to England. On his journey to England he induced Medard des Groseilliers to return to the French service. After returning in 1688 to Canada, he served at missions in western Canada and died at Sault Ste. Marie at the age of eighty.

== Legacy ==
Lake Albanel, which runs parallel and to the east of Lake Mistassini, is named after him. The Charles Albanel rose, developed by Agriculture and Agri-Food Canada, was named in his honour.
