= Laurier J. Boisvert =

President of the Canadian Space Agency

Laurier J. "Larry" Boisvert was the President of the Canadian Space Agency from April 12 to December 31, 2007, at which time he resigned from that position. He previously worked at Telesat from 1972 until his retirement in 2006.

Boisvert was inducted into the Society of Satellite Professionals International in February 2007. He obtained a Radar Technician Certification Diploma from the Royal Canadian Air Force in 1962 and graduated from the Carleton University Honours Commerce Program in 1981.
