= Joseph Obalski =

Canadian civil servant (1852–1915)

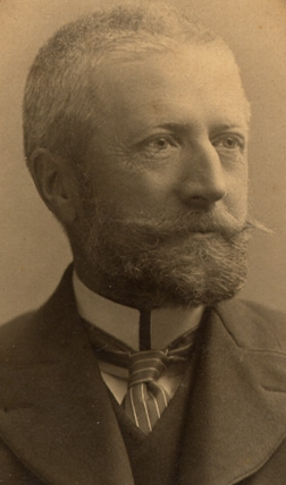
- Born: Joseph-François-Jacques-Victor Obalski; 14 September 1852; Châteaubriant, France
- Died: 25 March 1915 (aged 62); Montreal, Quebec
- Occupations: mining engineer, civil servant, professor, and author

Joseph Obalski (14 September 1852 – 25 March 1915) was a French-Canadian mining engineer, civil servant, professor, and author.

Born in Châteaubriant, France, of Polish origin from his father's side of the family, Obalski graduated from the École nationale supérieure des mines de Paris in 1877. After meeting the Premier of Quebec, Joseph-Adolphe Chapleau, while Chapleau was vacationing in France in 1881, Obalski was offered the post of provincial mining engineer. In 1881, he was working for the Quebec Department of Railways.

From 1882 to 1888, he was a professor at the École Polytechnique de Montréal. In 1889 he published Mines et minéraux de la province de Québec.

Joseph later became the Inspector of Mines for Quebec and visited the Chibougamau, Quebec gold prospect discovered by Peter McKenzie in 1903, publishing a report in 1904 stating his belief that one day Chibougamau would become an important mining district. L'Appel du Chibougamau by Larry Wilson-1956.
