= Barlow River (Chibougamau River tributary) =

Barlow
- Watershed of Nottaway River

Location
- Country: Canada
- Province: Quebec
- Region: Nord-du-Québec

Physical characteristics
- Source: Sirois Lake
  - location: Eeyou Istchee Baie-James, Nord-du-Québec, Quebec
  - coordinates: 50°07′25″N 74°06′27″W
  - elevation: 413 m (1,355 ft)
- Mouth: Chibougamau River
  - location: Eeyou Istchee Baie-James, Nord-du-Québec, Quebec
  - coordinates: 50°05′15″N 74°24′55″W
  - elevation: 363 m (1,191 ft)
- Length: 62.3 km (38.7 mi)

Basin features
- Tributaries
  - left: (in upstream order); Chébistuane River
  - right: (in upstream order); Discharge of Du Sauvage Lake; Blaiklock River; Mistago River.

The Barlow River is a tributary of the Chibougamau River, flowing into the Regional County Municipality (RCM) of Eeyou Istchee Baie-James, Jamésie, in the administrative region of Nord-du-Québec, in the province of Quebec, in Canada.

The course of the river successively crosses the townships of Plamondon, Richardson and Blaiklock. This river is also located in the Albanel Lakes Wildlife Sanctuary, Mistassini and Waconichi.

The upper part of the hydrographic slope of the "Barlow River" is accessible by a forest road from Chibougamau and going up to the North. The lower part is served by some forest roads that come from the south where passes route 113 which connects Lebel-sur-Quévillon to Chibougamau. This road goes south of Opémisca Lake.

The surface of the "Barlow River" is usually frozen from early November to mid-May, however, safe ice movement is generally from mid-November to mid-April.

== Geography ==
The main hydrographic slopes near the Barlow River are:
- North side: Blaiklock River, Mistago River, Mistassini Lake;
- East side: Waconichi Lake, Petite Meule River;
- South side: Chibougamau River, Chébistuane River, Chibougamau Lake;
- West side: Chibougamau River, Mistago River, Blaiklock River.

The Barlow River originates at the mouth of Lake Sirois (length: 2.4 kilometres (1.5 mi), elevation: 413 metres (1,355 ft)) in Richardson Township. This source is located at:

- 2.6 kilometres (1.6 mi) West of Waconichi Lake;
- 24.1 kilometres (15.0 mi) Southeast of Mistassini Lake;
- 19.4 kilometres (12.1 mi) Northeast of the mouth of the Barlow River (confluence with the Chibougamau River);
- 143.4 kilometres (89.1 mi) Northeast of the mouth of the Chibougamau River (confluence with the Opawica River);
- 205.2 kilometres (127.5 mi) Northeast of the mouth of Goéland Lake (Waswanipi River);
- 65.8 kilometres (40.9 mi) North of the village center of Chapais (Quebec)
- 30.4 kilometres (18.9 mi) Northeast of downtown Chibougamau;
- 367.2 kilometres (228.2 mi) East of the mouth of the Nottaway River.

From its source, the Barlow River flows on 62.3 kilometres (38.7 mi) according to the following segments:

Upper Barlow River (segment of 44.2 kilometres (27.5 mi))

- 17.9 kilometres (11.1 mi) northeasterly in a straight line, crossing three small unidentified lakes, then crossing on the north-west, the lake Willy (length: 0.5 kilometres (0.31 mi); altitude: 383 metres (1,257 ft)) to its mouth. Note: This segment of the river runs along the Northwest shore of Waconichi Lake and passes on the north-west side of Bouleau Mountain (elevation: 534 metres (1,752 ft));
- 5.5 kilometres (3.4 mi) southwesterly, entering Richardson Township, to the outlet of a set of five lakes (from the Northeast);
- 6.6 kilometres (4.1 mi) southwesterly then northwesterly, crossing the northern part of Lake Peter on 0.3 kilometres (0.19 mi) (length: 2.2 kilometres (1.4 mi); altitude: 370 metres (1,210 ft)) to its mouth;
- 14.2 kilometres (8.8 mi) winding northwest, then southwest as you enter Blaiklock Township, to the confluence of the Mistago River (coming from the North);

Lower Barlow River (segment of 18.1 kilometres (11.2 mi))

- 4.5 kilometres (2.8 mi) westerly to the confluence of the Blaiklock River (from the Northwest);
- 7.9 kilometres (4.9 mi) southwesterly by cutting a forest road to the confluence of the Chébistuane River (coming from the East);
- 5.7 kilometres (3.5 mi) southwesterly, in a marsh zone, to its mouth.
The Barlow River flows into a river bend on the north shore of the Chibougamau River in a marsh area upstream of Chevrillon Lake. From there, the current flows towards the South-West by borrowing the Chibougamau River up to the confluence of Opawica River. From the mouth of the Chibougamau River, the current flows generally southwesterly through the Waswanipi River to the East shore of Goéland Lake (Waswanipi River). The latter is crossed to the northwest by the Waswanipi River which is a tributary of Matagami Lake.

== Toponymy ==
This hydronym evokes the memory of Alfred-Ernest Barlow (1861–1914). He is one of the three sons of renowned topographer Robert Barlow. Alfred-Ernest worked for the Geological Survey of Canada from 1883 to 1907. He gained a certain reputation in Montreal as a consulting geologist. He is the author of some 60 studies of Canadian geology, including the report on the region of Chibougamau which he wrote with Gwillim and Faribault; at the end of its research, this report was published in 1911 by the Quebec Department of Mines, in its English version. Its English version is a translation of Joseph Obalski, in 1912. Barlow perished in the sinking of the Empress of Ireland, opposite Sainte-Luce, Quebec, in 1914. The Geography Commission, the current Commission de toponymie du Québec formalized this toponym on December 12, 1939.{}

The toponym "Barlow River" was formalized on December 5, 1968, at the Commission de toponymie du Québec, at the creation of this commission

== See also ==
- James Bay
- Rupert Bay
- Nottaway River, a watercourse
- Matagami Lake, a body of water
- Waswanipi River, a watercourse
- Goéland Lake (Waswanipi River), a body of water
- Lake Waswanipi, a body of water
- Chibougamau River, a watercourse
- Brock River (Chibougamau River), a watercourse
- Lakes Albanel, Mistassini and Waconichi Wildlife Sanctuary (French: "Réserve faunique des lacs Albanel, Mistassini et Waconichi)
- List of rivers of Quebec
