= Charron Lake (Normandin River) =

Lake in Quebec, Canada

- Location within Quebec
- Location: Le Domaine-du-Roy (RCM)
- Coordinates: 49°31′26″N 74°09′25″W
- Type: Natural
- Primary inflows: (clockwise); Boisvert River (Normandin River); outlet of a set of lakes such Arès, Javols, Maskusi and Hauriet; outlet of a set of lakes such du Bazar, Varry, Foisy, Dollard, Malans and Crévic.
- Primary outflows: La Blanche Lake
- Basin countries: Canada
- Max. length: 5.4 kilometres (3.4 mi)
- Max. width: 2.8 kilometres (1.7 mi)
- Surface area: 10.26 kilometres (6.38 mi)
- Surface elevation: 399 metres (1,309 ft)

Charron Lake is a freshwater body of the Lac-Ashuapmushuan, Quebec unorganized territory in the northwestern part of the Regional County Municipality (RCM) Le Domaine-du-Roy, in the administrative region of Saguenay-Lac-Saint-Jean, in province of Quebec, in Canada. This lake extends entirely in the canton of Charron.

Forestry is the main economic activity of the sector. Recreational tourism activities come second.

The forest road route 167 linking Chibougamau to Saint-Félicien, Quebec passes on the west shore of Charron Lake. The Canadian National Railway runs along this road.

The surface of Charron Lake is usually frozen from early November to mid-May, however, safe ice circulation is generally from mid-November to mid-April.

== Geography ==
Charron Lake has a length of 5.4 kilometres (3.4 mi), a maximum width of 2.8 kilometres (1.7 mi) and an altitude of 399 metres (1,309 ft). The outline of the lake resembles the distorted letter M. A peninsula detaches itself from the North shore, near the mouth of the Boisvert River (Normandin River) and stretches south for 1.4 kilometres (0.87 mi). This lake has 35 islands, the largest of which has a length of 0.7 kilometres (0.43 mi). The hamlet "Rivière-Boisvert" is located at the mouth of the lake, along route 167, where a campground is set up.

The mouth of Lake Charron is located at:

- 18.7 kilometres (11.6 mi) northwest of the mouth of Nicabau Lake, the southern portion of which is crossed by the Normandin River;
- 32.0 kilometres (19.9 mi) northwest of the mouth of Poutrincourt Lake;
- 43.9 kilometres (27.3 mi) west of the mouth of the Normandin River (confluence with Ashuapmushuan Lake);
- 162.9 kilometres (101.2 mi) northwest of the mouth of the Ashuapmushuan River (confluence with lac Saint-Jean);
- 201.4 kilometres (125.1 mi) west of the mouth of lac Saint-Jean (confluence with the Saguenay River).

The main hydrographic slopes near Charron Lake are:

- North side: Boisvert River (Normandin River), Boisvert Lake, Armitage River, Énard River, Chibougamau Lake;
- East side: Coquille River (Normandin River), Chaudière River (Normandin River), Ashuapmushuan River;
- south side: Nicabau Lake, Rohault Lake, Normandin River, Bouteroue Lake;
- West side: Malo Lake, Obatogamau Lakes, Nemenjiche Lake, Nemenjiche River, Opawica River.
The Boisvert River flows to the bottom of a bay on the northeast shore of Charron Lake, which the current crosses over 4.3 kilometres (2.7 mi) to its mouth located at the route 167. From there, the current flows through "Lac la Blanche" on 7.4 kilometres (4.6 mi), Lake Jourdain on 9.8 kilometres (6.1 mi) and Nicabau Lake on 9.7 kilometres (6.0 mi) to the dam at its mouth. From there, the current flows south-east along the Normandin River on 38.7 kilometres (24.0 mi) to the northwestern shore of Ashuapmushuan Lake. Then, the current flows through the Ashuapmushuan River which flows to Saint-Félicien, Quebec on the west shore of Lac Saint-Jean.

== Toponymy ==
Formerly, this lake was designated "lac la Blanche" because of its extension to the north of the current "lac la Blanche" (English: White Lake). The term "Charron" is a family name of French origin.

The toponym "Lac Charron" was formalized on December 5, 1968, by the Commission de toponymie du Québec, i.e. at the creation of this commission.

== See also ==
- Lac Saint-Jean, a body of water
- Ashuapmushuan River, a watercourse
- Ashuapmushuan Lake, a body of water
- Normandin River, a watercourse
- Nicabau Lake, a body of water
- Le Domaine-du-Roy, a regional county municipality (MRC)
- Lac-Ashuapmushuan, Quebec, an unorganized territory
- List of lakes in Canada
