= Chevrillon Lake =

Lake in Quebec, Canada

- Watershed of Nottaway River

- Location within Quebec
- Location: Eeyou Istchee James Bay Regional Government
- Coordinates: 50°00′37″N 74°27′36″W
- Type: Natural
- Basin countries: Canada
- Max. length: 12.9 kilometres (8.0 mi)
- Max. width: 3.2 kilometres (2.0 mi)
- Surface elevation: 363 metres (1,191 ft)

Chevrillon Lake is a freshwater body crossed by the Chibougamau River, in the southern part of Eeyou Istchee James Bay (municipality), in the administrative region of Nord-du-Québec, in the province of Quebec, in Canada.

The lake is part of the townships of Vienna, Barlow, Blaiklock and McKenzie. Forestry is the main economic activity of the sector. Recreational tourism activities come second.

The Chevrillon Lake hydrographic slope is accessible via a R1029 forest road serving the Southwest of "Lac du Sauvage" and separating from the road leading to the village of Oujé-Bougoumou. This last road is attached to route 113 linking Lebel-sur-Quévillon to Chibougamau.

The surface of Chevrillon Lake is usually frozen from early November to mid-May, however safe ice circulation is generally from mid-November to mid-April.

== Geography ==
This lake is shaped like a large V, forming an elbow at the Chibougamau River. This lake has a length of 12.9 kilometres (8.0 mi), a maximum width of 3.2 kilometres (2.0 mi) and an altitude of 363 metres (1,191 ft). An island of 7.3 kilometres (4.5 mi) is located in the center of the lake. Fed by Chibougamau Lake, the Chibougamau River forms a large S to go up north to the mouth of the Barlow River (Chibougamau River); then descends on a segment of 4.9 kilometres (3.0 mi) before discharging on the north shore of Chevrillon Lake.

The mouth of Lac Chevrillon is located at the bottom of a bay on the west side where there are several islands, namely:

- 33.7 kilometres (20.9 mi) north-east of the mouth of the Opémisca Lake, which is crossed by the Chibougamau River;
- 107.2 kilometres (66.6 mi) north-east of the mouth of the Chibougamau River (confluence with the Opawica River);
- 170.6 kilometres (106.0 mi) north-east of the mouth of Gull Lake (Waswanipi River);
- 15.9 kilometres (9.9 mi) north-west of downtown Chibougamau;
- 32.4 kilometres (20.1 mi) north-east of the village center of Chapais, Quebec;
- 450 kilometres (280 mi) Southeast of the mouth of the Nottaway River.

The main hydrographic slopes near Lac Chevrillon are:

- North side: Lac du Sauvage, Chibougamau River, Blaiklock River, Brock River (Chibougamau River);
- East side: Chibougamau River, Chébistuane River, Natevier River, Chibougamau Lake;
- South side: Chibougamau River, Guillim Lake, Simon Lake, Muscocho Lake, Obatogamau River;
- West side: Opémisca River, Chibougamau River.

== Toponymy ==
Formerly, this name has been designated "Lake Rush" and "Lake Rush". The term "Chevrillon" is a family name of French origin.

The toponym "Lac Chevrillon" was officialized on December 5, 1968 by the Commission de toponymie du Québec when it was created.

== See also ==
- James Bay
- Rupert Bay
- Nottaway River, a watercourse
- Matagami Lake, a body of water
- Waswanipi River, a watercourse
- Chibougamau River, a watercourse
- Eeyou Istchee Baie-James (municipality), a municipality
- List of lakes in Canada
