= Mistissini (Cree village municipality) =

Mistissini ᒥᔅᑎᓯᓃ
- Cree village municipality
- Bay Pénicouane that marks the border between Cree village municipality and Category II lands

- Flag

- Location within Quebec
- Coordinates (187, chemin Main): 50°19′N 74°01′W
- Country: Canada
- Province: Quebec
- Region: Nord-du-Québec
- RCM: None
- Constituted: June 28, 1978

Government
  - Mayor: Thomas Neeposh
  - Federal riding: Abitibi—Baie-James—Nunavik—Eeyou
  - Prov. riding: Ungava

Area
  - Total: 519.10 km^{2} (200.43 sq mi)
  - Land: 488.03 km^{2} (188.43 sq mi)

Population (2021)
  - Total: 10
  - Density: 0/km^{2} (0/sq mi)
  - Change (2016–21): N/A
  - Dwellings: 3
- Time zone: UTC−05:00 (EST)
  - Summer (DST): UTC−04:00 (EDT)
- Postal code(s): G0W 1C0
- Area codes: 418 and 581

Mistissini (Cree: ᒥᔅᑎᓯᓃ, romanized: Mistisinî, lit. 'Big Rock') is a Cree village municipality in the territory of Eeyou Istchee in northern Quebec, Canada; it has a distinct legal status and classification from other kinds of village municipalities in Quebec: Naskapi village municipalities, northern villages (Inuit communities), and ordinary villages.

As with all other Cree village municipalities in Quebec, there is a counterpart Cree reserved land of the same name located nearby: Mistissini.

Despite the title of "village municipality" and the formalities that go along with it (for instance, having a mayor), Statistics Canada lists it (and all other Cree village municipalities in Quebec) as having few resident population or residential infrastructure (dwellings); it is the Cree reserved lands that are listed as having most of the population and residential dwellings in the 2021 census, the 2016 census, and earlier censuses.

== Geography ==
The village is located on the Watso peninsula in the form of a large C (open to the northeast) attached to the east bank, forming the north-eastern shore of the Du Poste Bay, barring the exit of this bay and including the village of Mistissini in the North-West. A road connected to Route 167 serves this peninsula. The village is located at the mouth of the Du Poste Bay and in the southern part of Abatagouche Bay.

== History ==
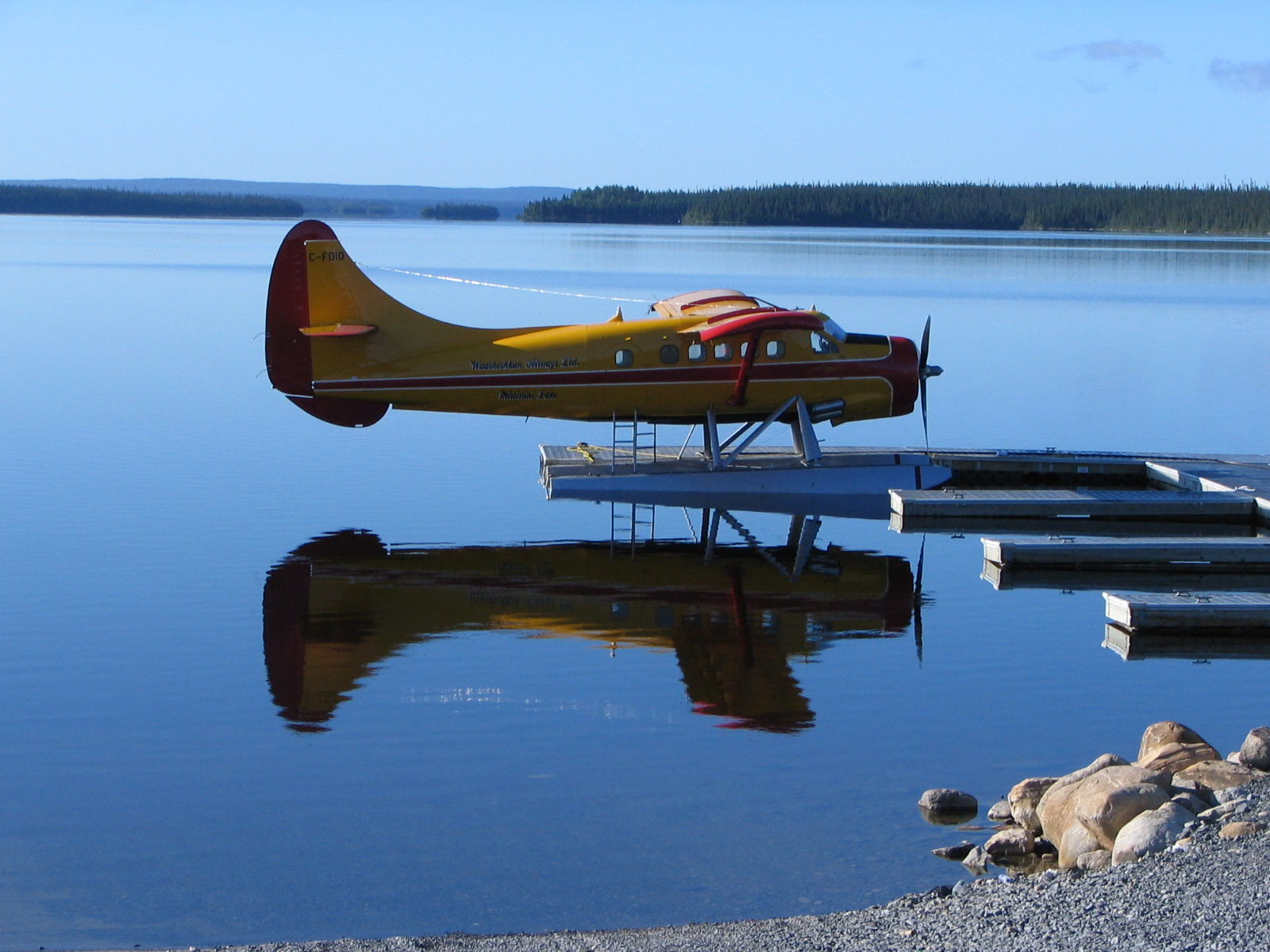
Nine-passenger Nordic seaplane operated by Waasheshkun Airways Ltd, Mistassini lake, Watson peninsula, 2005

The Cree have lived in the area of the watershed of the Rupert River and around Lake Mistassini for centuries. French explorers and traders entered it in the early 17th century. During the late 1600s, the French established a trading post on Lake Mistassini. The post was moved from time to time until the Hudson's Bay Company established it in the 19th century at what has developed as the current location of the village. The trading post was supplied by a canoe brigade based at Fort Rupert (today Waskaganish) up the Rupert River or through Neoskweskau (a former Cree site) on the Eastmain River. The itinerary of the trip moved south - first by Oskelaneo when the railway was built in 1910, and later by the region of Lac Saint-Jean. The road reached Mistissini in 1970. Over time, Mistissini and the various posts in the area have been designated: "Maison Dorval", "Patagoosh", "Abatagoushe", "Mistassini" and "Baie-du-Poste".

== Demographics ==
In the 2021 Census of Population conducted by Statistics Canada, Mistissini had a population of 10 living in 3 of its 3 total private dwellings, an increase from its 2016 population of 0. With a land area of 488.03 km^{2} (188.43 sq mi), it had a population density of 0.0/km^{2} (0.1/sq mi) in 2021.

== Languages ==
In Mistissini, according to the Institut de la statistique du Québec, the language most often spoken at home in 2011, by the population of 3,405 inhabitants, was Cree - 85.76%, French - 2.35% of inhabitants, and English - 10.87%.

== Gallery ==
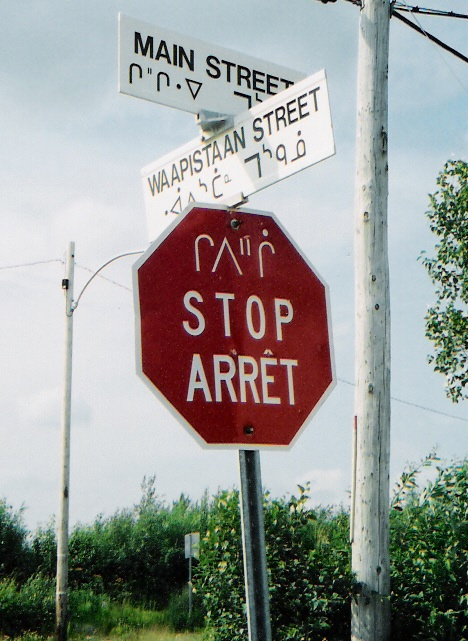
Multilingual road sign: Cree, English and French

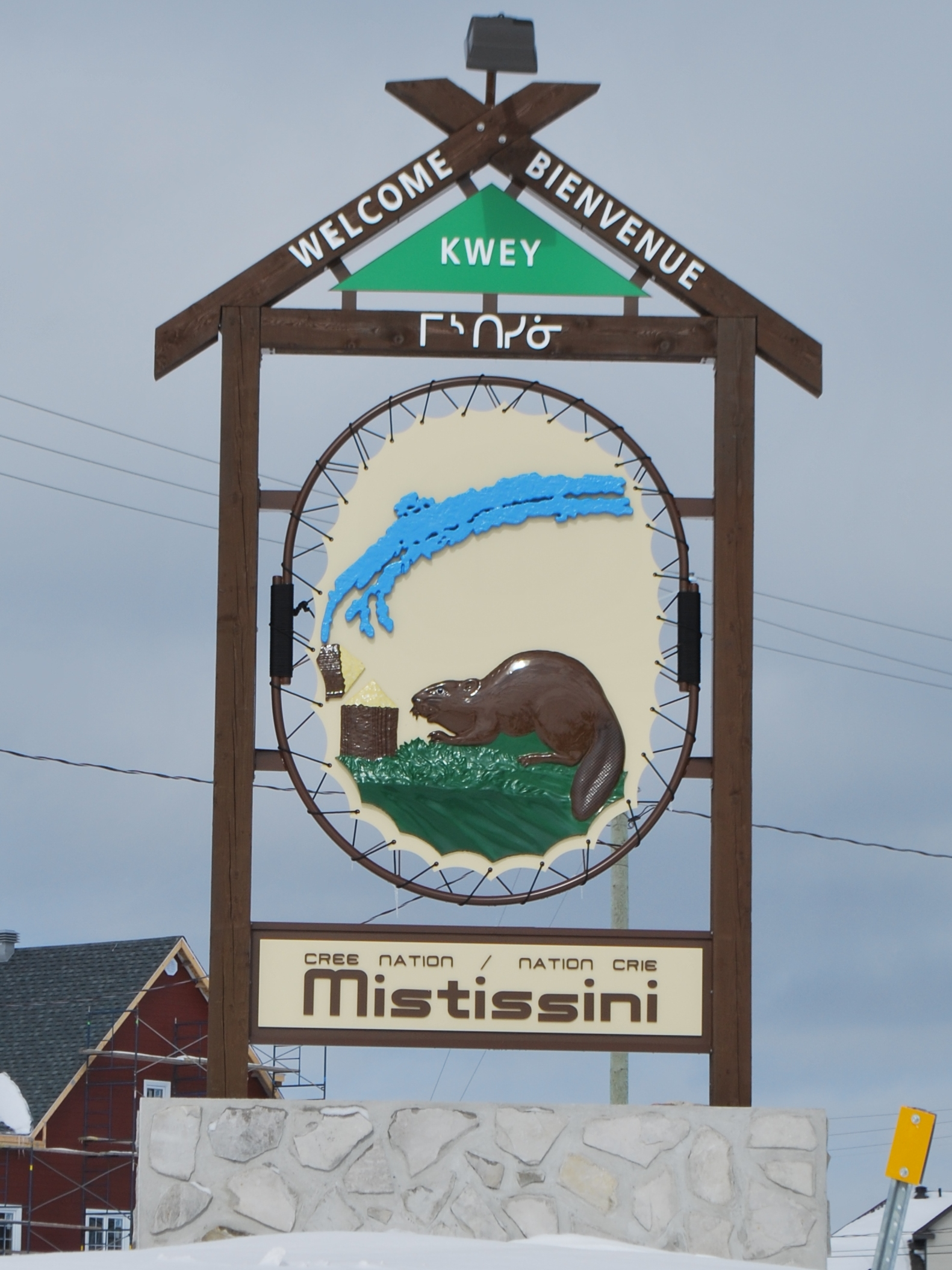
Welcome sign

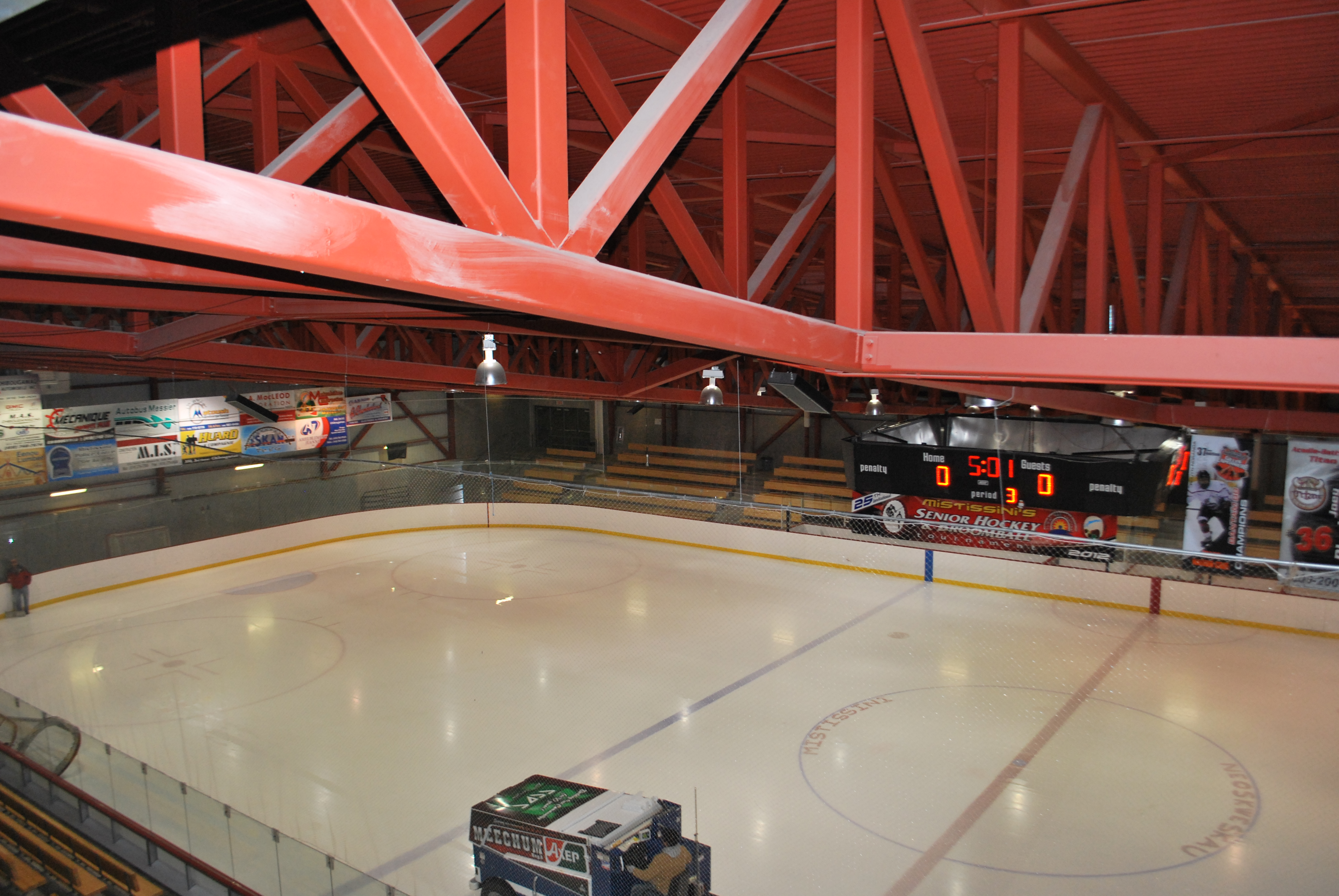
Interior of the arena

== See also ==
- List of anglophone communities in Quebec
- Mistassini Lake, a waterbody
- Nitchequon
