= Boisvert River =

River in Quebec, Canada

Boisvert
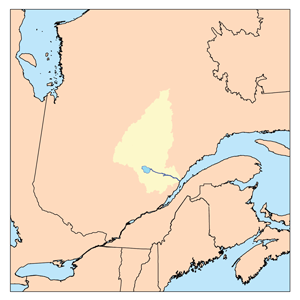
- Watershed of Saguenay River

Location
- Country: Canada
- Province: Quebec
- Region: Saguenay-Lac-Saint-Jean

Physical characteristics
- Source: Unidentified lake
  - location: Lac-Ashuapmushuan, Quebec, Le Domaine-du-Roy (RCM), Saguenay-Lac-Saint-Jean, Quebec
  - coordinates: 49°32′05″N 74°08′18″W
  - elevation: 467 m (1,532 ft)
- Mouth: Charron Lake
  - location: Lac-Ashuapmushuan, Quebec, Le Domaine-du-Roy (RCM), Saguenay-Lac-Saint-Jean, Quebec
  - coordinates: 49°12′12″N 73°47′51″W
  - elevation: 371 m (1,217 ft)
- Length: 79.9 km (49.6 mi)

Basin features
- Tributaries
  - left: (upstream); outlet of lake Gigors; outlet of a set of lakes; such Procas, Écueillé, Ergot, Boisvert and des Syrphes; outlet of lakes Intermédiaire; and Carayac; outlet of lakes Odin and Berloin; outlet of a set of lakes; such des Zeurènes, Ségur, Orvet, Rubens, Syrphes, Agnès, Pego, Lupien, Dumais and Bocé; outlet of lakes de l'Os, Perméable and du Bident; Hogan River; outlet of lakes du Boléro; and de l'Amande; outlet of lakes du Beigne and de la Moutarde.
  - right: (upstream); outlet of Crévie lake; outlet of lakes de la Besace, Bougie and Saxophone; outlet of lake des Anophèles; outlet of lakes Vernet, Horizon, Cropus and Djorf; outlet of lake de Marac; outlet of lake Fauteuil; outlet of lake Dollier, Pristol, du Conglomérat, du Bouton, Gaia, Plante and Monette; outlet of lake Melpomène; outlet of a set of lakes such des Psylles, Louim, Lierval and L'Alida; creek au Sable; outlet of lakes Sanac, Neveu and Brigon; outlet of lakes Niel and Chaliers; outlet of lake Houde; outlet of lakes Chazot, des Sélaginelles, Écuelle, en Épée, des Apaches and Cleppé; outlet of lake de la Fondation.

Boisvert River is a tributary of the north shore of Ashuapmushuan Lake, flowing into the unorganized territory of Lac-Ashuapmushuan, Quebec, into the Regional County Municipality (RCM) of Le Domaine-du-Roy, in the administrative region of Saguenay-Lac-Saint-Jean, in Quebec, in Canada.

This river successively crosses the townships of Thibaudeau, Bignell, McCorkill, Rinfret, Vimont, Dollier, Charron and Ducharme. The lower part of the Boisvert River valley runs through the Ashuapmushuan Wildlife Reserve. Forestry is the main economic activity of this valley; recreational tourism activities, second.

The southern part of the Boisvert River valley is served by route 167 which connects Chibougamau to Saint-Félicien, Quebec. Forest Road R1004 (heading northeast) that connects to route 167 serves the northwestern part of the Boisvert River valley and the eastern part of the valley from the Armitage River. The forest road R0210 (North-South direction) serves the eastern part of the valley of the Boisvert River and the valley of the Hogan River. Finally, the R1007 forest road serves the head lake area.

The surface of the Boisvert River is usually frozen from early November to mid-May, however, safe ice circulation is generally from mid-November to mid-April.

== Geography ==
The surrounding hydrographic slopes of the Boisvert River are:
- north side: Chibougamau Lake, Armitage River, Chonard River, Nepton River, Mistassini Lake;
- east side: Hogan River, Chief River, L'Épervier River, Dobleau River, Des Grèves River, Vimont Lake (Lac-Ashuapmushuan);
- south side: Rohault Lake, Bouteroue Lake, Coquille River (Normandin River), Normandin River, Chaudière River (Normandin River);
- west side: Armitage River, Énard River, Audet Creek, Chibougamau Lake, La Dauversière Lake.

The Boisvert River originates at the mouth of an unidentified lake (length: 2.4 kilometres (1.5 mi); altitude: 467 metres (1,532 ft)) located near the northwestern limit of the township of Thibaudeau. This headwater body is located on the eastern side of the water separation line; while the west side has a set of water bodies near a set of bodies of water, including the lakes Terrier, Bignell, Eva and Ida, which flow to the Waconichi Lake; the latest is attached to the southern part of Mistassini Lake.

This head lake of the Boisvert River is located at 2.0 kilometres (1.2 mi) west of a mountain peak of 543 metres (1,781 ft). The mouth of this head lake is located at:

- 16.6 kilometres (10.3 mi) south-east of Waconichi Lake;
- 22.1 kilometres (13.7 mi) south-east of Baie du Poste, south of Mistassini Lake;
- 22.3 kilometres (13.9 mi) northeast of a bay in Chibougamau Lake;
- 45.2 kilometres (28.1 mi) north-east of downtown Chibougamau;
- 62.7 kilometres (39.0 mi) north of the mouth of the Boisvert River (confluence with the Charron Lake);
- 80.1 kilometres (49.8 mi) north of the mouth of Nicabau Lake whose southern portion is crossed by the Normandin River;
- 94.4 kilometres (58.7 mi) northwest of the mouth of the Normandin River (confluence with Ashuapmushuan Lake).

From the mouth of the head lake, the Boisvert River flows over 79.9 kilometres (49.6 mi) according to the following segments:

Upper part of the Boisvert River (segment of 28.3 kilometres (17.6 mi)

- 2.7 kilometres (1.7 mi) southerly in the township of Thibaudeau including 2.0 kilometres (1.2 mi) along the boundary between the township of Thibaudeau and the township of Bignell, as well as crossing over 2.0 kilometres (1.2 mi) an unidentified lake that straddles the two townships, to the northern limit of McCorkill Township which is located in the middle of a small lake;
- 2.4 kilometres (1.5 mi) southerly in McCorkill Township through two small unidentified lakes, crossing over Lac Mousse Lake (elevation: 500 metres (1,600 ft) to the limit of the township of Thibaudeau (corresponding to the mouth of the lake);
- 1.4 kilometres (0.87 mi) southerly forming an easterly curve in Thibaudeau Township, returning to the boundary of McCorkill Township;
- 10.7 kilometres (6.6 mi) southwesterly in McCorbill Township, crossing Drouillard Lake (length: 6.5 kilometres (4.0 mi); altitude: 494 metres (1,621 ft) ) on its full length, to its mouth;
- 3.2 kilometres (2.0 mi) towards the south, to the limit of the canton of Rinfret;
- 7.9 kilometres (4.9 mi) towards the South-East in the canton of Rinfret, crossing the lake of l'Aiglon (length: 3.3 kilometres (2.1 mi); altitude: 408 metres (1,339 ft)) to its mouth. Note: Surrounded by marsh areas on the south side, lake Aiglon receives the Hogan River on the southeast;

Lower part of the Boisvert River (segment of 51.6 kilometres (32.1 mi)

- 10.5 kilometres (6.5 mi) southwesterly into marsh areas to the mouth of Os Lake, on the west side;
- 6.9 kilometres (4.3 mi) southwesterly to the limit of the township of Vimont;
- 4.7 kilometres (2.9 mi) to the southwest in the township of Vimont, up to

the eastern limit of the township of Dollier;

- 4.1 kilometres (2.5 mi) to the south crossing the Pulley Lake (length: 2.4 kilometres (1.5 mi); altitude: 405 metres (1,329 ft)), then to the West to the outlet of Dollier Lake;
- 9.2 kilometres (5.7 mi) southwesterly to the northern limit of the township of Charron;
- 2.8 kilometres (1.7 mi) southwesterly in the township of Charron, to the mouth of Lake Procas;
- 1.5 kilometres (0.93 mi) west to the outlet of Anopheles Lake;
- 11.9 kilometres (7.4 mi) to the south entering the Ashuapmushuan Wildlife Reserve to its mouth.

The Boisvert River flows into the bottom of a bay on the northeast shore of Charron Lake which the current crosses over 4.3 kilometres (2.7 mi) to its mouth located at route 167. From there, the current crosses Lac la Blanche on 7.4 kilometres (4.6 mi), lake Jordan on 9.8 kilometres (6.1 mi) and Nicabau Lake on 9.7 kilometres (6.0 mi) to the dam at its mouth. From there, the current flows south-east along the Normandin River on 38.7 kilometres (24.0 mi) to the northwestern shore of Ashuapmushuan Lake. Then, the current flows through the Ashuapmushuan River which flows to Saint-Félicien, Quebec on the west shore of Lac Saint-Jean.

The confluence of the Boisvert River with the Charron Lake is located at:

- 3.8 kilometres (2.4 mi) East of the Canadian National Railway and route 167;
- 20.9 kilometres (13.0 mi) north-west of the mouth of Nicabau Lake, the southern portion of which is crossed by the Normandin River;
- 44.6 kilometres (27.7 mi) northwest of the mouth of the Normandin River (confluence with Ashuapmushuan Lake);
- 162.1 kilometres (100.7 mi) northwest of the mouth of the Ashuapmushuan River (confluence with the lac Saint-Jean);
- 199.2 kilometres (123.8 mi) east of the mouth of lac Saint-Jean (confluence with the Saguenay River);
- 357.6 kilometres (222.2 mi) east of the mouth of the Saguenay River (confluence with the Estuary of Saint Lawrence).

== Toponymy ==
The term "Boisvert" is a family name of French origin.

The toponym "Boisvert River" was formalized on December 5, 1968, at the Commission de toponymie du Québec, when it was created.

== See also ==
- Estuary of Saint Lawrence
- Saguenay River
- Lac Saint-Jean, a body of water
- Ashuapmushuan River, a watercourse
- Ashuapmushuan Lake, a body of water
- Normandin River, a watercourse
- Ashuapmushuan Wildlife Reserve, a protected area
- Lac-Ashuapmushuan, Quebec, an unorganized territory
- Le Domaine-du-Roy, a regional county municipality (MRC)
- List of rivers of Quebec
