= Waconichi Lake =

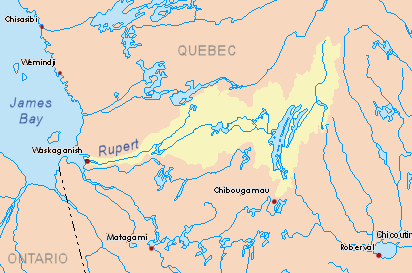
- Watershed of Rupert River

- Location within Quebec
- Location: Eeyou Istchee Baie-James
- Coordinates: 50°09′11″N 74°00′16″W
- Type: Natural
- Primary inflows: (in upstream order); Bordeleau creek; Bordeleau creek; discharge of lakes Galloway and Winsh; discharge of lake Richardson; discharge of lake Dufresne; Siikuunsiiwan creek on North shore; Rignell creek; Coubana creek.
- Primary outflows: Wanonichi River
- Basin countries: Canada
- Max. length: 32.9 kilometres (20.4 mi)
- Max. width: 5.6 kilometres (3.5 mi)
- Surface elevation: 386 metres (1,266 ft)

Waconichi Lake is a freshwater body of the Albanel, Mistassini and Waconichi Lakes Wildlife Sanctuary within the Eeyou Istchee Baie-James, in Jamésie, in the administrative region of Nord-du-Québec, in the province of Quebec, in Canada. The surface of the lake extends into the townships of Richardson and Bignell.

Forestry is the main economic activity of the sector. Recreational tourism activities come second.

The hydrographic slope of Waconichi Lake is accessible on the southeast side by the forest road route 167, coming from the southwest, Chibougamau; and on the west side by a secondary road connecting to the south of the lake at route 167 and going north to the Assinica Wildlife Sanctuary.

The surface of Waconichi Lake is usually frozen from early November to mid-May, however, safe ice movement is generally from mid-November to mid-April.

== Geography ==
The hydrographic slope of Lake Waconichi is relatively small because the watershed is close to the shores of the lake.

This lake is fed on the southeast side by Bordeleau Creek, which empties into Spawning Bay; on the southwest side by the outlet of Galloway and Winsh Lakes, which empties into Osprey Bay; the Northwest Side by the Richardson Lake outlet; on the northeastern side, by the outlet of Dufresne Lake and Siikuunsiiwan Creek that flow into Northeast Bay; on the northeast side in the Strait to the mouth, Rignell Creek and Coubana Creek.

Lake Waconichi has a length of 32.9 kilometres (20.4 mi), a maximum width of 5.6 kilometres (3.5 mi) and an altitude of 386 metres (1,266 ft). The main bays are: Spawning, Road, Cliff, Osprey and Kastell. The main islands are: Musset, Heart and Mimi.

The mouth of "Waconichi Lake" is located at the bottom of a bay in the northeastern part of the lake, at:

- 31.4 kilometres (19.5 mi) North of Chibougamau Lake;
- 24 kilometres (15 mi) South of the village center of Mistissini, Quebec;
- 4.6 kilometres (2.9 mi) South of the mouth of the Waconichi River;
- 93.8 kilometres (58.3 mi) South of the mouth of Mistassini Lake;
- 49.7 kilometres (30.9 mi) Northeast of downtown Chibougamau;
- 85.9 kilometres (53.4 mi) Northeast of the village center of Chapais, Quebec

The main hydrographic slopes near Lake Waconichi are:

- North side: Chébistuane River, Barlow River (Chibougamau River), Mistago River;
- East side: Lake Éva, Boisvert River, Nepton River, Chief River;
- South side: France River, Chibougamau Lake, Dorés Lake, Chibougamau River;
- West side: Chevrillon Lake, Chibougamau River.

From the mouth of Waconichi Lake, the current flows through the "Fall of the Foam", then down the Waconichi River on North (6.2 kilometres (3.9 mi) to the South Bank from the "Baie du Poste". The current flows through this bay on 26.6 kilometres (16.5 mi) which is an extension of Abatagouche Bay located south of Mistassini Lake.

== Toponymy ==
Of Innu origin, the term Waconichi means "mountain of crumbled rocks". "Lake Wahwanichi" is a variation used in Surveyor Henry O'Sullivan's 1901 report; this report describes areas between Lake Saint-Jean and James Bay. Subsequently, several other variants of the graph have been in use: Wacounipi, Wakonichi, Wakurinitche and Wakwconvertche.

The toponym "lac Waconichi" was formalized on December 5, 1968, by the Commission de toponymie du Québec when it was created.

== See also ==
- Hudson Bay
- Rupert River, a watercourse
- Mistassini Lake, a watercourse
- Waconichi River, a watercourse
- Eeyou Istchee Baie-James (municipality), a municipality
- List of lakes in Canada
