= Waconichi River =

Waconichi
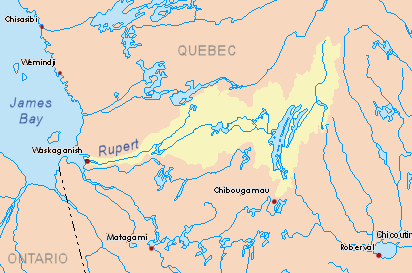

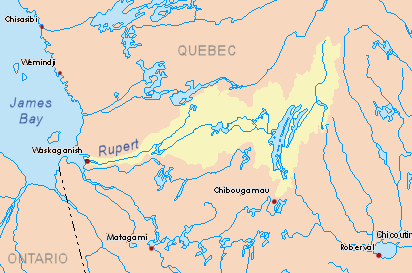
- Watershed of Rupert River

Location
- Country: Canada
- Province: Quebec
- Region: Nord-du-Québec

Physical characteristics
- Source: Waconichi Lake
  - location: Eeyou Istchee Baie-James, Nord-du-Québec, Quebec
  - coordinates: 50°03′17″N 74°13′53″W
  - elevation: 386 m (1,266 ft)
- Mouth: Mistassini Lake
  - location: Eeyou Istchee Baie-James, Nord-du-Québec, Quebec
  - coordinates: 50°14′44″N 73°48′57″W
  - elevation: 375 m (1,230 ft)
- Length: 6.2 km (3.9 mi)

The Waconichi River is a tributary of the Mistassini Lake, flowing into the Regional County Municipality (MRC) of Eeyou Istchee Baie-James, in Jamésie, in the administrative region of Nord-du-Québec, in the province of Quebec, in Canada.

The course of the river flows entirely in O'Sullivan Township and in Albanel, Mistassini and Waconichi Lakes Wildlife Sanctuary.

The hydrographic slope of the river is served by route 167, which is going north along the right shore of the Waconichi Lake and the river of the same name.

The surface of the "Waconichi River" is usually frozen from early November to mid-May; however, safe ice circulation is generally from mid-November to mid-April.

== Geography ==
The main hydrographic slopes near the "Waconichi River" are:
- North side: Mistassini Lake, Rupert River, Albanel Lake;
- East side: File Ax Lake, Chief's River, Ouasiemsca River;
- South side: Waconichi Lake, Chibougamau River, Chibougamau Lake;
- West side: Mistassini Lake (Penicouane Bay), Chibougamau River, Barlow River (Chibougamau River), Pipounichouane River Brock River North.

The "Waconichi River" originates at the mouth of Waconichi Lake (length: 32.9 kilometres (20.4 mi), elevation: 386 metres (1,266 ft)) in Richardson Township. This source is located at:

- 5.3 kilometres (3.3 mi) Southeast of the mouth of the Waconichi River (confluence with the Mistassini Lake ("Baie du Poste"));
- 99.3 kilometres (61.7 mi) Southeast of the mouth of Mistassini Lake (confluence with the Rupert River);
- 85.6 kilometres (53.2 mi) Northeast of the village center of Chapais, Quebec;
- 49.0 kilometres (30.4 mi) Northeast of downtown Chibougamau;
- 375 kilometres (233 mi) East of the mouth of the Rupert River.

From its source, the Waconichi River flows northward across 6.2 kilometres (3.9 mi), crossing three lakes formed by a widening of the river.

The Waconichi River flows to the bottom of Poste Bay, which is an extension to the south of [Mistassini Lake]. From there, the current flows through Mistassini Lake on the North, then West. The current first crosses the bay of the Post Office and passes the village of Mistissini (Cree village municipality) before passing through a strait to join Abatagouche Bay formed by the Abagouche Peninsula advancing on 32.8 kilometres (20.4 mi) to the North. After circling this peninsula, the current runs westward across the Mistassini Lake across its width, then crosses an archipelago on the west bank, before reaching its mouth. From the mouth of the river, the current flows generally westward through the Rupert River to the eastern shore of James Bay.

The mouth of the "Waconichi River" is located at:

- 36 kilometres (22 mi) north of a bay in the northern part of Chibougamau Lake;
- 94.5 kilometres (58.7 mi) South of the mouth of the Mistassini Lake;
- 89.4 kilometres (55.6 mi) northeast of the village center of Chapais, Quebec;
- 53.9 kilometres (33.5 mi) north of downtown Chibougamau.

== Toponymy ==
Of Cree origin, this hydronym means: "the river of the mountain of the tripe of rock (polypode of Virginia)".

The name "Waconichi River" was officialized on July 10, 1969, at the Commission de toponymie du Québec.

== See also ==
- James Bay
- Rupert Bay
- Rupert River, a watercourse
- Mistassini Lake, a body of water
- Waconichi Lake, a body of water
- Albanel, Mistassini and Waconichi Lakes Wildlife Sanctuary
- List of rivers of Quebec
