= Lake Mistassini =

Largest natural lake in Quebec, Canada

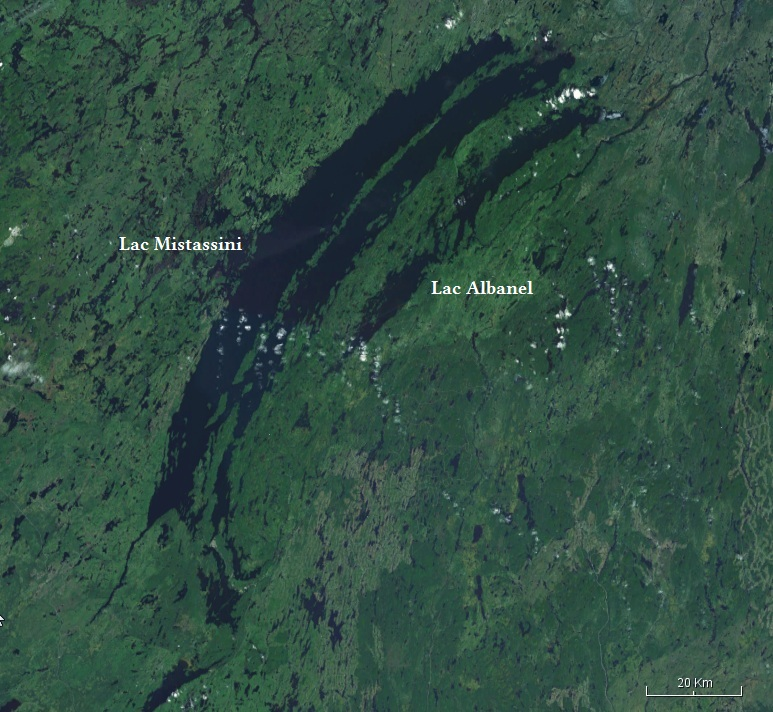
- Satellite image of Lakes Mistassini and Albanel

- Location in Quebec
- Location: Baie-James, Jamésie Territory, Quebec
- Coordinates: 50°57′N 73°42′W
- Type: Oligotrophic
- Primary inflows: Wabissinane River, Pépeshquasati River, Takwa River, Lake Albanel, Chalifour River (via Cabistachouane Bay), À la Perche River (Mistassini Lake) (via De l'Esker Bay and Du Poste Bay), Waconichi River (via Du Poste Bay), Pipounichouane River (via "Des Plongeurs Bay")
- Primary outflows: Rupert River
- Catchment area: 19,676 km^{2} (7,597 sq mi)
- Basin countries: Canada
- Max. length: 161 km (100 mi)
- Max. width: 19 km (12 mi)
- Surface area: 2,164 km^{2} (836 sq mi)
- Average depth: 69.3 m (227 ft)
- Max. depth: 183 m (600 ft)
- Water volume: 150 km^{3} (36 cu mi)
- Shore length^{1}: 3,235 km (2,010 mi)
- Surface elevation: 372 m (1,220 ft)
- Frozen: November to June
- Islands: Pahipanouk; Tchapahipane
- ^{1} Shore length is not a well-defined measure.

Lake Mistassini (French: Lac Mistassini) is the largest natural lake by surface area in the province of Quebec, Canada, with a total surface area of approximately 2,335 square kilometres (902 sq mi) and a net area (water surface area only) of 2,164 square kilometres (836 sq mi). It is located in the Jamésie region of the province, approximately 360 kilometers (220 mi) east of James Bay. The Cree town of Mistissini is located on Watson Peninsula in the south-east corner of the lake, which separates Baie du Poste from Abatagouche Bay. Extensive forests of spruce, birch, pine, and fir trees, which support a booming forestry industry, surround the lake.

Significant tributaries flowing into the lake include: Chalifour, Pépeshquasati, Takwa, Témiscamie, and Wabissinane.

Other nearby lakes include Lake Albanel and Lake Troilus.

== Etymology ==
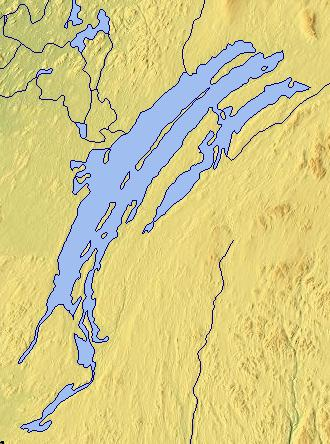
Map of Lake Mistassini with Lake Albanel to the east

The name Mistassini came from the Cree mista assini or Montagnais mishta ashini, and means "large rock"; it probably refers to a large glacial erratic stone, about 3 meters (9.8 ft) high, located near the outlet of Lake Mistassini into the Rupert River.

Over the centuries, it went through many name changes and different spellings. In 1664, on a map by Ducreux, this lake was known as Outakgami. On maps by Jolliet (1684), Jaillot (1685) and Franquelin (1688), the lake was identified as Timagaming. In 1703, the cartographer Guillaume Delisle used the same name, along with the name Mistasin. Laure (1731) and Bellin (1744) showed on their maps the name Lake Mistassins. Other spelling variations of this First Nations designation included: Mistacinnee, Mistacsinney, Mistasinne, Mistasinia, etc.

In 1808, James McKenzie of the North West Company used the name Lake Mistassini in his writings, the first use of the name in its current form. Nevertheless, other variants persisted long after: for instance, the explorer James Clouston inscribed Mistassinnie in his diary of 1820, while the geologist Robert Bell mentioned in 1880 the name Misstissinny. Yet, thereafter, Mistassini became the accepted form, as evidenced by the map of the province of Quebec drawn in 1880 by Taché, and the expedition report published by Albert Peter Low in 1885, and in his Annual Report of 1900, Bell also adopted the current spelling.

== Pre-contact ==
In the summer of 1948 Rogers and Rogers found 121 prehistoric sites in the region about Lake Mistassini and Albanel. At site 33, a sandy bank 15 to 20 feet high, where the land in back of the banks was comparatively flat and dry, First Nations people in the area in 1948 claimed to have camped since time immemorial. At the time of the Rogerses' research in 1948, First Nation people were still using campsites on 36% of the 121 prehistoric sites.

== History ==
The existence of this large lake was known to French explorers prior to its official discovery; Samuel de Champlain knew of it in 1603. It was finally discovered by Europeans in 1663 as part of an expedition ordered by Governor D'Avaugour and led by Guillaume Couture (first settler of Pointe-Lévy (Lévis) and hero of New France). He was accompanied by Pierre Duquet and Jean Langlois, as well as by Native American guides; the whole group consisted of a fleet of 44 canoes. They went up the Saguenay River, reached Lake Mistassini and continued on the Rupert River, which flows to the Hudson Bay.

Thereafter, Lake Mistassini became an important step along the route from the Saguenay to James Bay. In 1672, Charles Albanel crossed the lake in an official mission. On June 18, 1672, he wrote: "We entered the great Lake Mistassirinins [...]; this Lake is named for the rocks with which it abounds, which are of prodigious size." That same year, a fur trading post was established on the lake. Its location was shifted from time to time until 1821, when the Hudson's Bay Company established it at the present site of the village Mistissini.

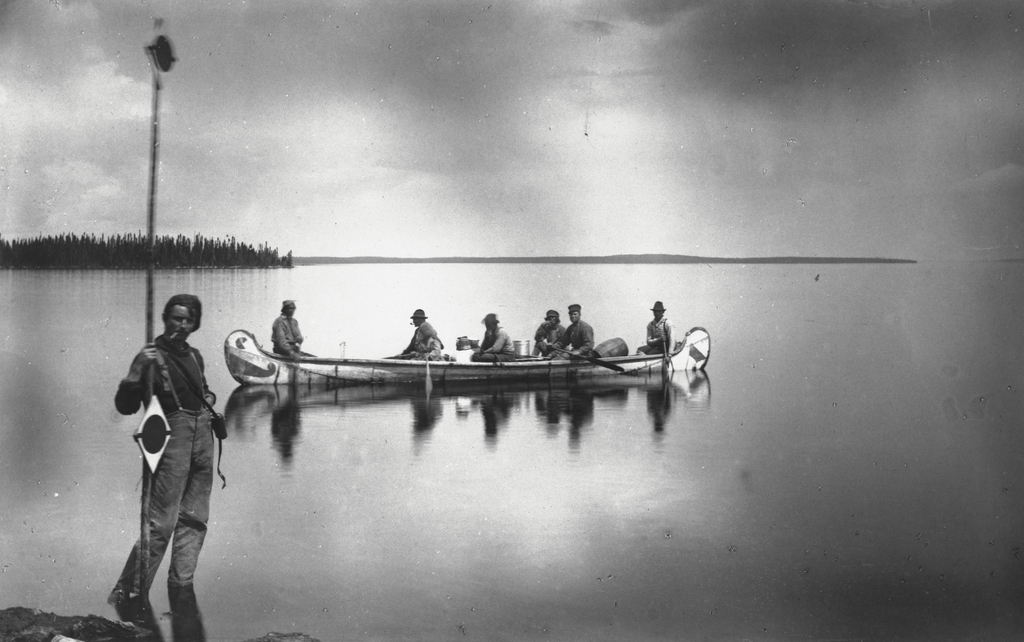
Large bark canoe on the northwest side of Lake Mistassini (1884)

In 1953-4 Mistassini Cree camp leader Alfie Matoush allowed ethnographer Edwards Rogers and his wife to join Matoush's 13-member hunting group in their traditional hunting territory in the eastern Subarctic. Rogers observed the variety of game and resources that the Matoush group exploited. He noted that they were able to derive a high percentage of what they needed to live, which included an impressive variety of game and resources, sufficient to keep their health at a better level than other, more sedentary First Nation people who lived in hamlets. Their traditional hunting grounds, an area northeast of Lake Mistassini, were near the headwaters of the Eastmain River and just south of Noakokan. Lake Indicator (Lac Indicateur on modern maps) is near their southern boundary. Rogers observed that Lake Indicator was used as an early winter base for hunting and trapping. He noted the remains of an earth-covered conical lodge, four house pits, and a log cabin. Rogers noted that the Mistassini First Nations left their summer encampments in late August or early September at the lower end of Lake Mistassini and moved to their hunting grounds, where the men built a fall camp. From October through December they lived in early winter camps which were more substantial. This was where they cached their canoes. During the hardest part of the winter, they moved to different hunting camps. In April, they moved back to the early winter camp, and by the end of May they returned to their summer camp at the south end of Lake Mistassini.

The earth-covered conical lodge, three house pits, and the remains of a log cabin were near the Matoush early winter camp (1953-1954), about mid-way on the west shore of Lake Indicator. The earth-covered conical lodge was used by Matoush's parents, his siblings, and his own family c. 1915-1920 as an early winter camp from October to January.

The known distribution of earth-covered conical lodges in the eastern Subarctic extends from the east coast of James Bay at the Eastman River post, the lower Rupert River, and Fort George.

== Geography ==
=== Main islands ===
(Clockwise, from the mouth)

Northwest part of the lake (from Radisson Bay)
- Chouart Island,
- Piéwi Island,
- Pariseau Island,
- Fafard Island,
- Joseph Island,

Area of the Ouachimiscau Peninsula (attached to the North Shore and forming a chain of aligned islands from north to south, to the middle of the lake)

- Pahipanouk Island,
- Island of the Arabesques,
- Walcott Island,
- Chino Island,
- Rousseau Island,
- Guy Island,
- Ovide-Brunet Island,
- Island of the Pass,
- Pelletier Island,
- Lemoine Island,
- Guillaume-Couture Island,
- Oaostipagache Island,
- Kasapominskat Archipelago,
- Dablon Island,

Abatagouche Peninsula Area (attached to the South Bank and forming a chain of islands lined up from north to south from the middle of the lake)

- Marie-Victorin Island,
- André-Michaux Island,
- Kaawanisheuyach Island,
- Mintunikus Island Misaupinanuch,
- Manitounouc Island,

Du Poste Bay (linked on the North with Abatagouche Bay)

- Chipaiyahouk Island,
- Katchinoantchi Island,

East Shore of the lake (North to South order)

- Saint Joseph Island,
- Berry Island,
- Sainte-Marie Island,
- Cache Island,
- Holy Cross Island,
- Rauchine Island,
- Kicheriniou Island,
- Réaumur Island,
- Vallard Island,
- Bélanger Island,
- Morain Island,
- Verreault Island,
- Thevet Island,
- Macoun Island.

Abatagouche Bay

- Némékouch Island,
- Kawioinanassa Island,

Southwest part of the lake (in order, from south to north, to Radisson Bay)

- Montpetit Island,
- Koudoudjés Island,
- Kaachiiuhch Island Misaupinanuch,
- Kakwéwatimi Island,
- Taché Island,
- Island Baillargé (at the bottom of a bay),
- Mistassini Island,
- Clouston Island,
- Ailly Island,
- Lanctôt Island,
- Bellin Island,
- Manitou Island,
- Aquin Island,
- Cooter Island.

=== Peninsulas, capes and bays ===
Northwestern part of the lake

(from Radisson Bay to the North)

- Des Groseillers peninsula,
- Fafard Bay,
- De la Roche Rouge Bay,
- Wiyachimiskow Bay,
- Wiyachimiskow Point,
- Mikoassas Point,
- Thistle Point,
- Jallot Bay,
- Saint-Onge Point,

Ouachimiscau Peninsula (attached to the North Shore and forming a chain of aligned islands from north to south from the middle of the lake) (from north to south)

- Barbeau Bay,
- Pass Grand Percé,
- Pointe Roze,
- Kucyniak Bay,
- Bay Provancher,
- Osmonde bay,
- Coucouchiche Bay,
- Anse des Grandes Orgues,
- Strawberry Bay,
- Rousseau Bay,
- Pass Kapchahipachich,
- Pointe Alexandre,
- Mitsteweow Point,
- Kapasaptouanewits Bay,
- Abatagouche Peninsula,
- Kaupanchiih Point Misaupinanuch,
- Divers Bay,

East shore of the lake (in order, from North to South)

Dauphin Peninsula (separating Lake Albanel and Lake Mistassini) (from North to South)

- Pointe Normandin,
- Portage Bay,
- Lake Muk,
- Bay of the Hidden Fall,
- Singing Cove,
- Pointe Saint-Jean,
- Pointe Saint-Nicolas,
- Fort Dorval Peninsula,
- Kaamiywaanapiskach Bay,
- Lamarck Bay,
- Portage Kaapuuhspuuhskutesinanuch
- Macoun Island,
- Kaamitisteyaapuhsitech tip,
- Manawchitounan Bay,
- Manitou Point,
- Manitou Bay,
- Georges-Côté Peninsula

Abatagouche Bay (bounded on the West by the Abatagouche Peninsula) (from South to North)

- Chepatouk Peninsula,
- Iserhoff Bay,
- Chepatouk Peninsula,
- Pointe des Fétiches,
- Tamatiskat Point,
- Du Festin Tip,

Du Poste Bay (linked on the North with Abatagouche Bay)

- Watso Peninsula,
- Ayikwapit Peninsula,
- De l'Esker Bay,
- Bois Vert Bay,
- Chachikoun Bay,
- Petite baie Chachikoun,
- Pointe Fleury,

Southwest part of the lake (South to Radisson Bay)

- Pénicouane Bay,
- Delisle Bay,
- Crevier Point,
- Urban Bay,
- Billings Peninsula,
- Kakwéwatimi peninsula,
- Radisson Bay (mouth of Mistassini Lake)

== Access roads ==
The eastern sector of Mistassini Lake (including the village of Mistissini and the hamlet Rivière-Chalifour) is accessible from Chibougamau by the Route 167. This road goes north to the east shore of Albanel Lake. Some secondary forest roads connect to this main road.

== See also ==
- List of lakes of Quebec
- Cree Hunters of Mistassini
- Mistassini dike swarm
