= Le Royer Lake =

Chevrier Lake
- Watershed of Nottaway River

- Location within Quebec
- Location: Eeyou Istchee James Bay Regional Government
- Coordinates: 49°35′30″N 74°27′30″W
- Type: Natural
- Primary inflows: outlet of La Dauversière Lake; outlet of the bay of three lakes.
- Primary outflows: Obatogamau River via the lakes Chevrier Lake (Obatogamau River), Muscocho, Eau Jaune
- Basin countries: Canada
- Max. length: 7.9 kilometres (4.9 mi)
- Max. width: 3.2 kilometres (2.0 mi)
- Surface elevation: 365 metres (1,198 ft)

Lake Le Royer is a freshwater body integrated into a set of lakes designated "Obatogamau Lakes", within the Eeyou Istchee James Bay (municipality) area, within the administrative region of Nord-du-Québec, province of Quebec, Canada. This lake extends in the townships of Fancamp and La Dauversière.

Forestry is the main economic activity of the sector. Recreational tourism activities come second.

The hydrographic slope of Lac Royer is accessible by a branch of a forest road connecting to the north at route 113 (linking Lebel-sur-Quévillon and Chibougamau) and the Canadian National Railway.

The surface of Le Royer Lake is usually frozen from early November to mid-May, however, safe ice circulation is generally from mid-November to mid-April.

== Geography ==
As part of the reservoir of Obatogamau Lakes, Le Royer Lake has a length of7.9 kilometres (4.9 mi), a maximum width of 3.2 kilometres (2.0 mi) and an altitude of 365 metres (1,198 ft).

Le Royer Lake has a rather complex shape with several bays, peninsulas and islands. The "Three Lakes Bay" is located in the southern part of the lake; a peninsula advancing eastward on the 1.8 kilometres (1.1 mi) separates these three lakes from Le Royer Lake.

Le Royer Lake gets its supplies on the east side by the dump of the [Lac La Dauversière]. The Obatogamau River (tributary of the Chibougamau River) drains this vast body of water. The mouth of Lake Royer is located at the bottom of a bay barred by an island that separates it from Chevrier Lake (Obatogamau River). This mouth is located at:

- 22.6 kilometres (14.0 mi) East of the mouth of the Eau Jaune Lake;
- 33.0 kilometres (20.5 mi) east of the mouth of the Presqu'île Lake (Nord-du-Québec);
- 88.8 kilometres (55.2 mi) east of the mouth of the Obatogamau River (confluence with the

Chibougamau River);

- 119 kilometres (74 mi) north-east of the mouth of the Chibougamau River (confluence with the Opawica River);
- 35.4 kilometres (22.0 mi) South of downtown Chibougamau;
- 42.6 kilometres (26.5 mi) south-east of the village center of Chapais, Quebec.

The main hydrographic slopes near Le Royer Lake are:

- North side: Chevrier Lake (Obatogamau River), Merrill Lake, Dorés Lake (Chibougamau River), Chibougamau Lake, Chibougamau River;
- East side: La Dauversière Lake, Boisvert River, Rohault Lake;
- South side: Nemenjiche Lake, Opawica River, Nemenjiche River;
- West side: Verneuil Lake, Eau Jaune Lake, Muscocho Lake, Irene River, Obatogamau River.

Le Royer Lake empties on the North side by a short strait in Chevrier Lake (Obatogamau River).

== Toponymy ==
The toponym "lac Le Royer" was formalized on December 5, 1968, by the Commission de toponymie du Québec, when it was created.

== See also ==
- Nottaway River, a watercourse
- Matagami Lake, a body of water
- Waswanipi River, a watercourse
- Chibougamau River, a watercourse
- Obatogamau River, a watercourse
- Obatogamau Lakes, a set of bodies of water
- Chevrier Lake (Obatogamau River), a body of water
- Eeyou Istchee Baie-James (municipality), a municipality
- List of lakes in Canada
