= La Dauversière Lake =

- Watershed of Nottaway River

- Location within Quebec
- Location: Eeyou Istchee Baie-James
- Coordinates: 49°34′00″N 74°22′10″W
- Type: Natural
- Primary inflows: outlet of lake Guntz; outlet of a set of lakes including Perron, Hamel and Laurent; outlet of a set of lakesincluding Tippecanoe, Dufresne, des Nacerdes, Cabanac and L’Échenay; Nemenjiche River; outlet of lake Norhart; lake Le Royer; lake Holmes.
- Primary outflows: Obatogamau River; via lakes Le Royer, Chevrier, Muscocho and Eau Jaune.
- Basin countries: Canada
- Max. length: 10.6 kilometres (6.6 mi)
- Max. width: 9.9 kilometres (6.2 mi)
- Surface elevation: 365 kilometres (227 mi)

The La Dauversière Lake is a freshwater body integrated into a set of lakes designated "Obatogamau Lakes, in the territory of Eeyou Istchee James Bay (municipality), in the administrative region of Nord-du-Québec, province of Quebec, in Canada. This lake extends entirely in the township of La Dauversière.

Forestry is the main economic activity of the sector. Recreational tourism activities come second.

The hydrographic slope of Lac La Dauversière is accessible by a branch of a road to the north at route 113 (linking Lebel-sur-Quevillon and Chibougamau) and the Canadian National Railway.

The surface of Lac La Dauversière is usually frozen from early November to mid-May, but it is safe from mid-November to mid-April.

== Geography ==
As part of the Lake Obatogamau reservoir, Lac La Dauversière has a length of 10.6 kilometres (6.6 mi), a maximum width of 9.9 kilometres (6.2 mi) and an altitude of 365 metres (1,198 ft).

The lake La Dauversière has a rather complex shape with several bays, peninsulas and islands. The main islands are: Weaver, Birch, Americans and Ducks. The main points are: Nipples and Cemetery. The main bays are: Three Lakes Bay, Nemenjiche Bay, First Bay of Obatogamau Lakes, Second Bay of Lakes Obatogamau and Third Bay of Obatogamau Lakes.

Lac La Dauversière gets its supplies from the North-East side of the mill and Calmor lakes; on the east side by Audet Creek; on the southeast side, by Royer Lake outlet; on Obatogamau lakes. The Obatogamau River (tributary of the Chibougamau River) drains this large body of water. The mouth of Lake Dauversière is located at the bottom of a bay in the Southwest at:

- 24.9 kilometres (15.5 mi) east of the mouth of the Eau Jaune Lake;
- 35.2 kilometres (21.9 mi) east of the mouth of the Presqu'île Lake (Nord-du-Québec);
- 83.2 kilometres (51.7 mi) east of the mouth of the Obatogamau River (confluence with the Chibougamau River);
- 113.2 kilometres (70.3 mi) north-east of the mouth of the Chibougamau River (confluence with the Opawica River);
- 35.1 kilometres (21.8 mi) south of downtown Chibougamau;
- 37.4 kilometres (23.2 mi) south-east of the village center of Chapais.

The main hydrographic slopes near La Dauversière Lake are:

- North side: Merrill Lake, Dorés Lake (Chibougamau River), Chibougamau Lake, Chibougamau River;
- East side: Boisvert River (Normandin River), Boisvert Lake;
- South side: Le Royer Lake, Opawica River, Nemenjiche River;
- West side: Eau Jaune Lake, Muscocho Lake, Irene River, Obatogamau River.

Lac La Dauversière empties on the west side by a short strait in Le Royer Lake.

== Toponymy ==
In 1910, the Hudson's Bay Company built on the eastern shore of "lac La Dauversière" a cabin which will become over the years a place of storage. Finally this cabin was deserted. Originally known as "Dépôt-du-Lac-La Dauversière". In 1988, this place name will be standardized in the form of "Dépôt-des-Lacs-La Dauversière", as a locality.

The toponym "Lac La Dauversière" was made official on December 5, 1968 by the Commission de toponymie du Québec, when it was created.

== See also ==
- Nottaway River, a watercourse
- Matagami Lake, a body of water
- Waswanipi River, a watercourse
- Chibougamau River, a watercourse
- Obatogamau River, a watercourse
- Obatogamau Lakes, a set of bodies of water
- Eeyou Istchee Baie-James (municipality), a municipality
- List of lakes in Canada
