= Muscocho Lake =

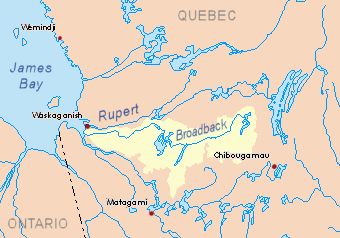
- Watershed of Broadback River

- Location within Quebec
- Location: Eeyou Istchee James Bay Regional Government
- Coordinates: 49°39′46″N 74°34′03″W
- Type: Natural
- Primary inflows: Obatogamau River; outlet of Agglomérat Lake.
- Primary outflows: Obatogamau River
- Basin countries: Canada
- Max. length: 10.3 kilometres (6.4 mi)
- Max. width: 1.7 kilometres (1.1 mi)
- Surface elevation: 365 metres (1,198 ft)

The Muscocho Lake is a body of water crossed by the Obatogamau River in the territory of Eeyou Istchee James Bay (municipality), in the administrative area of Nord-du-Québec, in the province of Quebec, in Canada. This lake extends in the cantons of Fancamp and Haüy.

Forestry is the main economic activity of the sector. Recreational tourism activities come second.

The hydrographic slope of Muscocho Lake is accessible via the R1040 forest road (going North-South) to the east of the lake and connecting to the north at route 113 (linking Lebel-sur-Quévillon and Chibougamau) and the Canadian National Railway. Haüy Township is located north of the lake.

The surface of Muscocho Lake is usually frozen from early November to mid-May, however safe ice movement is generally from mid-November to mid-April.

== Geography ==
Lake Muscocho has a length of 10.3 kilometres (6.4 mi), a maximum width of 1.7 kilometres (1.1 mi) and an altitude of 365 metres (1,198 ft), the same altitude as the reservoir area of Obatogamau Lakes located upstream to the southeast.

Lake Muscocho has an angled shape (open to the southwest) due to a peninsula advancing north-east on 5.0 kilometres (3.1 mi). This lake has 31 islands, the largest of which has a length of 1.1 kilometres (0.68 mi).

Muscocho Lake is an extension of the Obatogamau River (tributary of the Chibougamau River). This lake receives its waters on the south side in the canton of Fancamp. Upstream, the Obatogamau Lakes include, in particular, Lac Verneuil, Le Royer, La Dauversière, Holmes and Chevrier Lake (Obatogamau River).

The mouth of Lake Muscocho is located at the end of a short strait crossed by an island (length: 0.5 km) separating it from Keith Lake. This mouth is located at:

- 7.4 kilometres (4.6 mi) east of the mouth of the Eau Jaune Lake;
- 17.9 kilometres (11.1 mi) east of the mouth of the Presqu'île Lake (Nord-du-Québec);
- 65.4 kilometres (40.6 mi) east of the mouth of the Obatogamau River (confluence with the Chibougamau River);
- 96.4 kilometres (59.9 mi) north-east of the mouth of the Chibougamau River (confluence with the Opawica River);
- 32.4 kilometres (20.1 mi) south-west of downtown Chibougamau;
- 19.6 kilometres (12.2 mi) south-east of the village center of Chapais, Quebec.

The main hydrographic slopes near Lake Muscocho are:

- North side: Goudreau Lake, Lac Simon, Chevrillon Lake, Dorés Lake (Chibougamau River), Chibougamau Lake, Chibougamau River;
- East side: La Dauversière Lake, Chevrier Lake (Obatogamau River), Boisvert River;
- South side: Obatogamau Lakes, Caopatina Lake, Verneuil lake, Opawica River, Nemenjiche River;
- West side: Eau Jaune Lake, Presqu'île Lake (Nord-du-Québec), Irene River, Obatogamau River.

== Toponymy ==
The oldest mention of this hydronym on maps dates back to 1927. Of Cree origin, its meaning is similar to herbs. The term "Muscocho" could come from "maskusiy", a generic term for any kind of grass or hay. According to Father Louis-Philippe Vaillancourt, miskoskou, in Cree, has for sense there is a lot of grass.

The toponym "Lake Muscocho" was formalized on December 5, 1968, by the Commission de toponymie du Québec, when it was created.

== See also ==
- Nottaway River, a watercourse
- Matagami Lake, a body of water
- Waswanipi River, a watercourse
- Chibougamau River, a watercourse
- Obatogamau River, a watercourse
- Obatogamau Lakes, a set of bodies of water
- Chevrier Lake (Obatogamau River), a body of water
- Eeyou Istchee Baie-James (municipality), a municipality
- List of lakes in Canada
