= Énard River =

Tributary of Lac Chibougamau (Nottaway Slope), Northern Quebec, Canada

Énard
- Watershed of Nottaway River

Location
- Country: Canada
- Province: Quebec
- Region: Nord-du-Québec

Physical characteristics
- Source: Inlet Lake
  - location: Eeyou Istchee James Bay, Nord-du-Québec, Quebec
  - coordinates: 49°42′31″N 74°20′50″W
  - elevation: 379 m (1,243 ft)
- Mouth: Chibougamau Lake
  - location: Chibougamau, Nord-du-Québec, Quebec
  - coordinates: 49°45′20″N 74°19′02″W
  - elevation: 379 m (1,243 ft)
- Length: 7.8 km (4.8 mi)

The Énard River is a tributary of Chibougamau Lake, flowing into the municipalities of Eeyou Istchee James Bay and Chibougamau, in Jamésie, in the administrative region of Nord-du-Québec, in the province of Quebec, in Canada.

The course of this river runs entirely in the townships of Queylus and Obalski.

The Énard River hydrographic slope is accessible via route 167, which serves the west and south side of Chibougamau Lake. This last road links Chibougamau and Saint-Félicien, Quebec. The Canadian National Railway spans the Énard River at the mouth of Inlet Lake.

The surface of the Énard River is usually frozen from the beginning of November to the middle of May, however the safe circulation on the ice is usually from mid-November to mid-April.

== Geography ==
The main hydrographic slopes near the Énard River are:
- North side: Chibougamau Lake (Inlet Bay), Dorés Lake (Chibougamau River);
- East side: Armitage River, Boisvert River;
- South side: Audet Creek, Palmer Lake, Chevrier Lake, La Dauversière Lake, Obatogamau Lakes;
- West side: Merrill Lake, Chibougamau River, Muscocho Lake, Obatogamau River, Eau Jaune Lake.

The Énard River originates at the mouth of Inlet Lake (length: 1.4 kilometres (0.87 mi); elevation: 379 metres (1,243 ft)) in Queylus Township. This lake is located between route 167 and the railway. This source is located at:

- 5.7 kilometres (3.5 mi) South of the mouth of the Énard River (confluence with the Chibougamau Lake);
- 22.6 kilometres (14.0 mi) South of the mouth of Chibougamau Lake;
- 5.8 kilometres (3.6 mi) south-east of the center of Obalski hamlet;
- 10.0 kilometres (6.2 mi) south-east of the mouth of the Dorés Lake (Chibougamau River);
- 23 kilometres (14 mi) south-east of downtown Chibougamau;
- 13.6 kilometres (8.5 mi) north-west of the boundary between Eeyou Istchee Baie-James (municipality) (administrative region of Nord-du-Québec) and the Regional County Municipality (MRC) Le Domaine-du-Roy (administrative region of Saguenay-Lac-Saint-Jean).

From its source (Inlet Lake), the Énard River flows over 7.8 kilometres (4.8 mi) to the northeast according to the following segments:

- 4.2 kilometres (2.6 mi) to the North by cutting the Canadian National Railway to the southern limit of the town of Chibougamau;
- 3.6 kilometres (2.2 mi) northeast in the town of Chibougamau (Obalski Township), to its mouth.

The Énard River flows on the south shore of Inlet Bay which is an extension to the southwest of Chibougamau Lake. This bay is bounded on the west by the Devlin Peninsula (length: 6.4 kilometres (4.0 mi) to "Long Point") which stretches northeast towards the center of Chibougamau Lake. This sector of the lake has several dozens of islands including the islands of Yvonne, Alphonse and Boulder.

From this mouth, the current flows over 17.6 kilometres (10.9 mi), crossing the Chibougamau Lake to the North and skirting the island of Portage, to its mouth. Chibougamau Lake is the main head lake of Chibougamau River.

From the mouth of Chibougamau Lake, the current crosses the Dorés Lake (Chibougamau River), then descends generally to the southwest (except the large S of the upper part of the river) by taking the Chibougamau River, to its confluence with the Opawica River. From this confluence, the current flows generally southwesterly through the Waswanipi River to the east shore of Goéland Lake (Waswanipi River). The latter is crossed to the northwest by the Waswanipi River which is a tributary of Matagami Lake. Finally, the current flows along the Nottaway River and empties into Rupert Bay, south of James Bay.

The mouth of the Énard River located at:

- 8.4 kilometres (5.2 mi) north-east of the mouth of the Dorés Lake (Chibougamau River);
- 17.1 kilometres (10.6 mi) South of the mouth of Chibougamau Lake;
- 120.5 kilometres (74.9 mi) north-east of the mouth of the Chibougamau River (confluence with the Opawica River);
- 382 kilometres (237 mi) South of the mouth of the Nottaway River;
- 39.1 kilometres (24.3 mi) east of the village center of Chapais, Quebec;
- 18.2 kilometres (11.3 mi) south-east of downtown Chibougamau.

== Toponymy ==
The toponym Rivière Énard was formalized on July 17, 1970 at the Commission de toponymie du Québec.

== See also ==
- James Bay
- Rupert Bay
- Nottaway River, a watercourse
- Matagami Lake, a body of water
- Waswanipi River, a watercourse
- Goéland Lake (Waswanipi River), a body of water
- Chibougamau River, a watercourse
- Chibougamau Lake, a body of water
- Eeyou Istchee James Bay (municipality), a territory equivalent to a Regional County Municipality (MRC)
- Chibougamau, a city
- List of rivers of Quebec
