= Chevrier Lake (Obatogamau River) =

Lake in Quebec, Canada

- Watershed of Nottaway River

- Location within Quebec
- Location: Eeyou Istchee Baie-James
- Coordinates: 49°38′08″N 74°27′50″W
- Type: Natural
- Primary inflows: Obatogamau Lakes; Le Royer Lake; outlet of Lakes du Moulin and Calmor; Audet creek.
- Primary outflows: Obatogamau River
- Basin countries: Canada
- Max. length: 5.8 kilometres (3.6 mi)
- Max. width: 3.6 kilometres (2.2 mi)
- Surface elevation: 365 metres (1,198 ft)

The Chevrier Lake is a freshwater body integrated into a set of lakes designated "Obatogamau Lakes", in the Eeyou Istchee James Bay (municipality) area, in the area of Nord-du-Québec, in the province of Quebec, Canada. This lake extends into the townships of Queylus, La Dauversière, Fancamp and Haüy.

Forestry is the main economic activity of the sector. Recreational tourism activities come second.

The hydrographic slope of Chevrier Lake is accessible by a branch of a forest road connecting to the north at route 113 (linking Lebel-sur-Quévillon and Chibougamau) and the Canadian National Railway.

The surface of Lake Chevrier is usually frozen from early November to mid-May, however safe ice circulation is generally mid-November to mid-April.

== Geography ==
As part of the Lake Obatogamau reservoir, Chevrier Lake has a length of 5.8 kilometres (3.6 mi), a maximum width of 3.6 kilometres (2.2 mi) and a maximum of altitude of 365 metres (1,198 ft).

Lake Chevrier has a rather complex shape with several bays, peninsulas and islands. Lake Chevrier gets its supplies from the North-East side by the dump of the Moulin and Calmor lakes; on the east side by Audet Creek; on the southeast side, by the Lac Royer outlet; on the South side by the discharge of other lakes integrated into Obatogamau Lakes. The Obatogamau River (tributary of the Chibougamau River) drains this vast body of water. The mouth of Lake Chevrier is located at the bottom of a bay in the Southwest at:

- 15.8 kilometres (9.8 mi) east of the mouth of the Eau Jaune Lake;
- 26.1 kilometres (16.2 mi) east of the mouth of the Presqu'île Lake (Nord-du-Québec);
- 73.2 kilometres (45.5 mi) east of the mouth of the Obatogamau River (confluence with the Chibougamau River);
- 31.5 kilometres (19.6 mi) south of downtown Chibougamau;
- 27.2 kilometres (16.9 mi) south-east of the village center of Chapais, Quebec;
- 104.9 kilometres (65.2 mi) east of the mouth of the Chibougamau River (confluence with the Opawica River).

The main hydrographic slopes near Lake Chevrier are:

- North side: Merrill Lake, Dorés Lake (Chibougamau River), Chibougamau Lake, Chibougamau River;
- East side: Boisvert River (Normandin River), La Dauversière Lake;
- South side: Lac Le Royer, Opawica River, Nemenjiche River;
- West side: Eau Jaune Lake, Muscocho Lake, Irene River, Obatogamau River.

== Toponymy ==
In 1910, the Hudson's Bay Company built on the east shore of La Dauversière Lake a cabin which will become over the years a place of storage. Finally this cabin was deserted. Originally known as "Dépôt-du-Lac-Chevrier". In 1988, this place name will be standardized in the form Dépôt-des-Lacs-Chevrier ", as a locality.

The toponym "Lac Chevrier" was formalized on December 5, 1968, by the Commission de toponymie du Québec, when it was created.

== See also ==
- Nottaway River, a watercourse
- Matagami Lake, a body of water
- Waswanipi River, a watercourse
- Chibougamau River, a watercourse
- Obatogamau River, a watercourse
- Obatogamau Lakes, a set of bodies of water
- Eeyou Istchee Baie-James (municipality), a municipality
- List of lakes in Canada
