= Deux Orignaux River =

Deux Orignaux
- Watershed of Nottaway River

Location
- Country: Canada
- Province: Quebec
- Region: Nord-du-Québec

Physical characteristics
- Source: Orignaux Lake
  - location: Eeyou Istchee Baie-James, Nord-du-Québec, Quebec
  - coordinates: 49°51′49″N 75°19′47″W
  - elevation: 337 m (1,106 ft)
- Mouth: Obatogamau River
  - location: Eeyou Istchee Baie-James, Nord-du-Québec, Quebec
  - coordinates: 49°48′20″N 75°30′21″W
  - elevation: 329 m (1,079 ft)

The Deux Orignaux River is a tributary of the Obatogamau River, flowing into the Regional County Municipality (RCM) of Eeyou Istchee Baie-James, in the administrative region of Nord-du-Québec, in the province of Quebec, in Canada. The course of the river flows entirely into the canton of Dolomieu.

The hydrographic slope of the "Deux Orignaux River" is accessible via route 113 which links Lebel-sur-Quévillon to Chibougamau and passes to the south of the lake.

The surface of the "Deux Orignaux River" is usually frozen from early November to mid-May, however traffic Ice safety is usually from mid-November to mid-April.

== Geography ==
The main hydrographic slopes near the "Deux Orignaux River" are:
- North side: Orignaux Lake, Kapunapotagen Lake, Chibougamau River;
- East side: Obatogamau River, Presqu'île Lake (Nord-du-Québec);
- South side: Mechamego Lake, Obatogamau River, Mechamego Creek;
- West side: Chibougamau River, Obatogamau River.

The "Deux Orignaux River" has its source at the mouth of "Lac des Orignaux" (length: 17.7 kilometres (11.0 mi); altitude: 337 metres (1,106 ft)); this lake extends into the Lamark and Dolomieu townships. Of elongated form in the North-South direction, except the "Bay of the Head of Heron" which is located in the South-West and is only at 0.7 kilometres (0.43 mi) in East of the Chibougamau River.

The mouth of "Lac des Orignaux" is located approximately in the middle of the lake on the East shore. This discharge is at:

- 3.5 kilometres (2.2 mi) Northwest of the mouth of Kapunapotagen Lake;
- 7.1 kilometres (4.4 mi) North of the mouth of the "Deux Orignaux River";
- 14.2 kilometres (8.8 mi) Northeast of the mouth of the Obatogamau River (confluence with the Chibougamau River);
- 114.3 kilometres (71.0 mi) northeast of the mouth of Goéland Lake (Waswanipi River);
- 35.8 kilometres (22.2 mi) west of the village center of Chapais;
- 69.1 kilometres (42.9 mi) south-west of downtown Chibougamau;
- 300 kilometres (190 mi) east of the mouth of the Nottaway River.

From its source (mouth of "Lac des Orignaux"), the "Deux Orignaux River" flows over 11.3 kilometres (7.0 mi) according to the following segments:

- 3.9 kilometres (2.4 mi) southeasterly across Kapunapotagen Lake (elevation: 337 metres (1,106 ft)) on its full length;
- 3.7 kilometres (2.3 mi) southwesterly to the bridge of route 113;
- 3.3 kilometres (2.1 mi) southwesterly to the western end of "Lac des Miserables" (altitude: 329 metres (1,079 ft));
- 0.4 kilometres (0.25 mi) west to mouth.
The "Deux Orignaux River" flows into the bottom of a bay on the northeast shore of Society Lake, which flows through the South on 1.8 kilometres (1.1 mi) to the outlet; the latter lake pours into the Obatogamau River. From there, the current flows towards the West by taking the course of the Obatogamau River, then towards the Southwest by the Chibougamau River, to the east shore of Goéland Lake (Waswanipi River). The latter is crossed to the northwest by the Waswanipi River which is a tributary of Matagami Lake.

== Toponymy ==
The toponym "rivière des Deux Orignaux" (English: Two Mooses River) was formalized on September 11, 1987 at the Commission de toponymie du Québec, at the creation of this commission

== See also ==
- James Bay
- Rupert Bay
- Nottaway River, a watercourse
- Matagami Lake, a body of water
- Waswanipi River, a watercourse
- Goéland Lake (Waswanipi River), a body of water
- Lake Waswanipi, a body of water
- Chibougamau River, a watercourse
- Obatogamau River, a watercourse
- List of rivers of Quebec
