= Armitage River =

Armitage
- Watershed of Nottaway River

Location
- Country: Canada
- Province: Quebec
- Region: Nord-du-Québec

Physical characteristics
- Source: André Lake
  - location: Chibougamau, Nord-du-Québec, Quebec
  - coordinates: 49°41′15″N 74°13′48″W
  - elevation: 409 m (1,342 ft)
- Mouth: Chibougamau Lake
  - location: Chibougamau, Nord-du-Québec, Quebec
  - coordinates: 49°52′04″N 74°03′30″W
  - elevation: 379 m (1,243 ft)
- Length: 26.7 km (16.6 mi)

Basin features
- Tributaries
  - left: Discharge of Des Îles Lake
  - right: (in upstream order); Villefagnan creek; discharge of Bernadette Lake; Wynne creek; discharge Guy Lake.

The Armitage River is a tributary of Chibougamau Lake, flowing in the town of Chibougamau, in Jamésie, in the administrative region of Nord-du-Québec, in the province of Quebec, in Canada.

The course of the river flows in the townships of Lemoine and Dollier.

The hydrographic slope of the Armitage River is accessible by the junction of a forest road serving the eastern side of Chibougamau Lake; the latter is connected by the North to route 167 which also serves the south side of Waconichi Lake and the Waconichi River. This last road comes from Chibougamau, going north-east to the south-eastern part of Mistassini Lake.

The surface of the Armitage River is usually frozen from early November to mid-May, however safe ice circulation is generally from mid-November to mid-April.

== Geography ==
The main hydrographic slopes near the Armitage River are:
- North side: Chibougamau Lake, Chibougamau River, Waconichi Lake, Mistassini Lake (baie de Poste), Pipounichouane River;
- East side: Nepton River, Nepton River North, Boisvert River (Normandin River), Chief River;
- South side: Boisvert River (Normandin River), Chibougamau Lake, Normandin River;
- West side: Chibougamau Lake, Chibougamau River, Dorés Lake (Chibougamau River), Énard River.

The Armitage River originates at the mouth of Lake André (length: 1.7 kilometres (1.1 mi); altitude: 409 metres (1,342 ft)) in Dollier Township. This source is located at:

- 17.6 kilometres (10.9 mi) South of the mouth of the Armitage River (confluence with the Chibougamau Lake);
- 5.9 kilometres (3.7 mi) south-east of Chibougamau Lake;
- 28.2 kilometres (17.5 mi) south of Waconichi Lake;
- 58.6 kilometres (36.4 mi) South of Mistassini Lake;
- 48.0 kilometres (29.8 mi) north-east of the village center of Chapais, Quebec;
- 20.3 kilometres (12.6 mi) Southeast of downtown Chibougamau;
- 128.3 kilometres (79.7 mi) Northeast of the mouth of the Chibougamau River (confluence with the Opawica River);
- 372 kilometres (231 mi) East of the mouth of the Nottaway River.

From its source (Lake André), the Armitage River flows over 26.7 kilometres (16.6 mi) generally to the northeast, according to the following segments:

- 1.5 kilometres (0.93 mi) northeasterly in Dollier Township in a marsh zone crossing a small unidentified lake on 0.3 kilometres (0.19 mi) (length: 0.4 kilometres (0.25 mi); altitude: 408 metres (1,339 ft) to the outlet of Guy Lake (coming from the South);
- 6.3 kilometres (3.9 mi) to the northeast in Dollier Township crossing some marsh areas, parallel to the northwestern shore of Stella Lake that the river current crosses for only a hundred meters at its northeastern end, to the southern limit of the canton of Lemoine;
- 1.6 kilometres (0.99 mi) northeasterly to the southwest shore of Lake Armitage;
- 8.4 kilometres (5.2 mi) north-east, crossing Lake Armitage (length: 9.1 kilometres (5.7 mi); altitude: 407 metres (1,335 ft)) to its mouth;
- 6.3 kilometres (3.9 mi) north-east to Villegagnan Creek (coming from the east);
- 2.6 kilometres (1.6 mi) northeasterly in a straight line to its mouth.

The Armitage River flows to the south shore of Girard Bay which is an extension of the Bay of Islands northeast of Chibougamau Lake. From the mouth of the Armitage River, a peninsula advances in a straight line across the 1.7 kilometres (1.1 mi) to the northeast in the bay to the Point Needle. The entrance to this bay has an opening of 1.1 kilometres (0.68 mi) between Needle Point and Boulder Point (East Bank).

From this mouth, the current flows on 18.1 kilometres (11.2 mi) crossing this bay towards the West which includes many islands, crossing to the west the Chibougamau Lake bypassing the Portage Island. Chibougamau Lake is the main head lake of Chibougamau River.

From the mouth of Chibougamau Lake, the current crosses the Lac aux Dorés, then descends generally to the southwest (except the large S of the upper part of the river) by taking the Chibougamau River, to its confluence with the Opawica River. From this confluence, the current flows generally to the southwest by the Waswanipi River to the east shore of Goéland Lake (Waswanipi River). The latter is crossed to the northwest by the Waswanipi River which is a tributary of Matagami Lake. Finally, the current flows along the Nottaway River and empties into Rupert Bay, south of James Bay.

The mouth of the Armitage River located at:

- 19.1 kilometres (11.9 mi) south-east of Waconichi Lake;
- 45.4 kilometres (28.2 mi) south of Mistassini Lake;
- 12.0 kilometres (7.5 mi) East of the mouth of Chibougamau Lake;
- 139.2 kilometres (86.5 mi) north-east of the mouth of the Chibougamau River (confluence with the Opawica River);
- 379.5 kilometres (235.8 mi) south-east of the mouth of the Nottaway River;
- 57.7 kilometres (35.9 mi) north-east of the village center of Chapais, Quebec;
- 23.3 kilometres (14.5 mi) East of downtown Chibougamau.

== Toponymy ==
This hydronym evokes the life work of Reginald S. Armitage (1892-1955), vice-president of the forestry company Price Brothers Limited. Armitage has played a major role as a pioneer and promoter of the development of the natural wealth of the region.

The toponym "Armitage River" was formalized on December 5, 1968, at the Commission de toponymie du Québec, that is to say, the foundation of this commission.

== See also ==
- James Bay
- Rupert Bay
- Nottaway River, a watercourse
- Matagami Lake, a body of water
- Waswanipi River, a watercourse
- Goéland Lake (Waswanipi River), a body of water
- Chibougamau River, a watercourse
- Chibougamau Lake, a body of water
- Chibougamau, a city
- List of rivers of Quebec
