= Nemenjiche Lake =

Body of water in Nord-du-Québec, Quebec, Canada

- Watershed of Nottaway River

- Location within Quebec
- Location: Baie-James
- Coordinates: 49°25′26″N 74°26′23″W
- Type: Natural
- Primary outflows: Nemenjiche River
- Basin countries: Canada
- Max. length: 6.0 kilometres (3.7 mi)
- Max. width: 2.0 kilometres (1.2 mi)
- Surface elevation: 394 metres (1,293 ft)

Lake Nemenjiche is a freshwater body of the southern part of Eeyou Istchee Baie-James, in the administrative region of Nord-du-Québec, in the province of Quebec, Canada.

Forestry is the main economic activity of the sector. Recreational tourism activities come second.

The hydrographic slope of Lake Nemenjiche is accessible through a forest road coming from the Northeast, coming off route 167. The surface of Lake Nemenjiche is usually frozen from early November to mid-May, however, safe ice circulation is generally from mid-November to mid-April.

== Geography ==
This lake has a length of 6.0 kilometres (3.7 mi) in the North-South direction, a maximum width of 2.0 kilometres (1.2 mi), and an altitude of 394 metres (1,293 ft).

This lake is located at 0.7 kilometres (0.43 mi) on the West side of the line between the Regional County Municipality (RCM) of Le Domaine-du-Roy and the Eeyou Istchee Baie-James; this demarcation constitutes the watershed between the James Bay side and the Lac Saint-Jean slope.

Of elongated shape in the North-South direction, this lake comprises about forty islands. It is supplied by the North by the discharge of a few small unidentified lakes and by the West by five unidentified lakes.

Lake Nemenjiche is the head lake of the river of the same name. The mouth of this lake is located at the bottom of a bay on the West Bank at:

- 11.2 kilometres (7.0 mi) South of the mouth of the Nemenjiche River (confluence with Obatogamau Lakes);
- 35.5 kilometres (22.1 mi) Southeast of the mouth of the “rivière à l’Eau Jaune” (Eau Jaune Lake) which is integrated with Obatogamau Lakes;
- 89 kilometres (55 mi) Southeast of the mouth of the Obatogamau River (confluence with the Chibougamau River);
- 183.4 kilometres (114.0 mi) East of the mouth of Goéland Lake (Waswanipi River);
- 54.1 kilometres (33.6 mi) South of downtown Chibougamau;
- 47.6 kilometres (29.6 mi) south-east of the village center of Chapais, Quebec

The main hydrographic slopes near Lake Nemenjiche are:

- North side: Nemenjiche River, Chibougamau River, Obatogamau Lakes;
- East side: Rohault Lake, Normandin River, Coquille River (Normandin River);
- South side: Opawica River, Cawcot River, Ventadour River;
- West side: Opawica River, Roy River, Surprise Lake.

== Toponymy ==
The toponym "lac Nemenjiche" was made official on December 5, 1968 by the Commission de toponymie du Québec, when it was created.

== See also ==
- Nottaway River, a watercourse
- Matagami Lake, a body of water
- Chibougamau River, a watercourse
- List of lakes in Canada
