= Nemenjiche =

Nemenjiche may refer to:

- Nemenjiche Lake, in Eeyou Istchee Baie-James, Quebec, Canada
- Nemenjiche River, a tributary of Obatogamau Lakes in Québec, Canada
