= Presqu'île crater =

Crater of Presqu'ile Lake, Northern Quebec, Canada

- French: Cratère du lac de la Presqu'île
- Location within Quebec
- Location: Jamésie, Nord-du-Québec, Quebec, Canada; 49°43′N 74°48′W

Impact crater structure
- Confidence: confirmed
- Diameter: 24 kilometres (15 mi)
- Age: less than 500 million years old (Cambrian period or earlier)
- Exposed: Yes
- Drilled: No
- Topo map: NTS 32G10 Lac à l'Eau Jaune

Presqu'île is a meteorite crater in the territory equivalent to a regional county municipality (TE) of Jamésie in the Nord-du-Québec region of Quebec, Canada, located about 3 kilometres (2 mi) south of the city of Chapais.

It is 24 kilometres (15 mi) in diameter and is estimated to be less than 500 million years old (Cambrian period or earlier). The crater is exposed at the surface.

== See also ==
- Presqu'île Lake, a waterbody
