= Opémiska Community Hall fire =

1980 fire in Chapais, Quebec, Canada

- Date: January 1, 1980
- Time: 1:15 a.m. EST
- Venue: Opémiska Community Hall
- Location: Chapais, Quebec, Canada; 49.7832°N 74.8608°W
- Type: Fire
- Cause: Pine branches used as Christmas decorations were carelessly set on fire
- Deaths: 48
- Injuries: 50
- Convicted: Florent Cantin
- Charges: Manslaughter
- Sentence: Eight years in prison

At 1:15 a.m. on January 1, 1980, a fire broke out at a New Year's Eve party at Opémiska Community Hall in Chapais, Quebec, Canada, when pine branches used as part of the venue's Christmas decorations were carelessly set on fire, killing 48 people and injuring 50 others.

== Context ==
The rural community of Chapais was established as a mining town in 1955. At its peak, the mine employed 700 of the 3500 inhabitants of the town, with a sawmill employing another 450. Falconbridge Copper Ltd., who operated the Opemiska mine, gifted the town with a community hall that could host 300 people. On December 8, 1979, the mine hosted a Christmas party for its employees at the community hall. A large number of Christmas trees were installed as decoration, and for the second year in a row, a large arch made of pine branches was installed near the entrance. Following the party, it was decided that the decorations would be kept in the room for the upcoming New Year celebration. In order to prevent the branches from drying out, an employee of the town hall was tasked with spraying the decorations with water. The employee went home during the holidays, resulting in the branches drying out for a few days between Christmas and the New Year.

During the night of December 31, 1979, the community hall hosted the New Year event as a fundraiser for the local Lions Club. The entrance fee was five dollars, and the club sold around 300 tickets. It was tradition in Chapais for people to move between different social gatherings in the new year to wish members of the community success in the new year. As such, it was decided that past midnight, people could enter without a ticket.

== Fire ==
After midnight, and the accompanying rush of townspeople exchanging greetings, the party started to die down. As such, around 1 a.m., when partygoers started going home, security was relaxed. At 1:15 a.m., Florent Cantin, a young laborer, was jokingly pretending to light the pine needles, intending to quickly snuff them out; instead he set fire to the arch of pine surrounding the entrance. Nearby patrons promptly attempted to put the fire out using fire extinguishers. The people inside the room did not evacuate, as they thought the fire was part of a prank, with the attempts to extinguish the fire being a performance. The volunteers succeeded in extinguishing the flames. However, the fire reignited when a nearby door was opened, allowing fresh oxygen to supply the embers. The fire then reignited and quickly spread to garlands hanging down from the roof. People began shouting for everyone to leave the room, and the crowd moved towards the left entrance to the building. The re-lit fire propagated through the room in mere seconds and provoked a power outage, shutting down all of the lights. In the ensuing chaos, it was found that the left door was blocked. A group of men managed to force the building's right entrance open, although this was partially blocked by uncleared snow.

As the evacuation was ongoing, volunteer firefighters from a fire station located 150 metres (500 ft) from the community hall arrived and tried in vain to put out the flames from the outside. Many of the partygoers who managed to escape had their clothes on fire as they left the building, and rolled in the snow to extinguish them. The badly burned victims were transported to a nearby CLSC, where only one nurse was on duty. The burned victims were then transported to the hospital in Chibougamau, 30 minutes away. The next morning, nine of the badly burned victims were moved from the hospital by helicopter to a larger hospital in Quebec City.

== Trial of Florent Cantin ==
Florent Cantin, the man who set the decorations on fire, pleaded guilty to manslaughter in the death of Robin Desjardins. During the trial, Cantin admitted to holding up a lighter to the flammable decorations with intent to "play with fire", but not to set the town hall ablaze. He compared the situation to people lighting paper napkins in celebration of the new year.

Cantin was originally sentenced to eight years in prison without parole for three years. This sentence was deemed harsh considering that Cantin's actions were negligent, but nevertheless were not intended to cause harm. Petitions were circulated by citizens and organisations of the province asking for a more lenient sentence. Following an appeal by Cantin, the sentence was reduced by the Quebec Superior Court to two years minus one day.

Upon his release from jail, Cantin moved away from the town, starting a new life elsewhere. Ten years later he was convicted of uttering threats against his wife.

== Effects on the region ==
The town of Chapais was deeply hurt by the loss of many lives. In addition to those who were physically injured, the events left a deep emotional scar on the inhabitants of the town. A memorial park with a walkway and plaque marks the location of the destroyed club. A social worker who authored a thesis on the psychological and social effects of the tragedy on the town stated that the inhabitants preferred not to talk about the fire, with the subject eventually becoming taboo. Most survivors did not receive any psychological help or counseling, and some resorted to alcohol or drugs in order to attempt to forget the events.
