= Obatogamau Lakes =

Group of lakes in Eeyou Istchee James Bay, Quebec, Canada

- Watershed of Nottaway River

- Location within Quebec
- Location: Eeyou Istchee Baie-James
- Coordinates: 49°35′37″N 74°27′20″W
- Type: Natural
- Primary inflows: Nemenjiche River, Audet Creek
- Primary outflows: Obatogamau River
- Basin countries: Canada
- Max. length: 37.2 kilometres (23.1 mi)
- Max. width: 19.6 kilometres (12.2 mi)
- Surface area: 76 kilometres (47 mi)
- Surface elevation: 365 metres (1,198 ft)
- Settlements: Eeyou Istchee Baie-James

The Obatogamau lakes constitute a group of freshwater bodies of the territory of Eeyou Istchee Baie-James, in the administrative region of Nord-du-Québec, in the Canadian province of Quebec. These lakes extend mainly in the cantons of Dauversière, Fancamp, Haüy and Queylus.

Forestry is the main economic activity of the sector. The recreational tourism activities come second.

The hydrographic slope of Obatogamau Lakes is accessible by route 167 and the railway of Canadian National Railway. These two transportation routes link Chibougamau to Saint-Félicien, Quebec.

The surface of Obatogamau Lakes is usually frozen from early November to mid-May, however safe ice movement is generally from mid-November to mid-April.

== Geography ==
This set of lakes located south of Chibougamau Lake has a length of 37.2 kilometres (23.1 mi), a maximum width of 19.6 kilometres (12.2 mi) and an altitude of 365 metres (1,198 ft).

The lakes Obatogamau have many lakes, bays, peninsulas and a hundreds of islands. Obatogamau lakes are sourced from the northeast side by Audet Creek and from the south by the Nemenjiche River. The Obatogamau River (tributary of the Chibougamau River) drains this vast body of water. The mouth of the Obatogamau Lakes is located at the bottom of a bay in the Northwest to:

- 12 kilometres (7.5 mi) South of a bay of Chibougamau Lake;
- 35 kilometres (22 mi) South of downtown Chibougamau;
- 37.2 kilometres (23.1 mi) Southeast of the village center of Chapais, Quebec;
- 82.3 kilometres (51.1 mi) East of the mouth of the Obatogamau River (confluence with the Chibougamau River).

The main hydrographic slopes near Obatogamau lakes are:

- North side: Dorés Lake (Chibougamau River), Chibougamau Lake, Chibougamau River;
- East side: Boisvert River, Chaudière River (Normandin River);
- South side: Normandin River, Rohault Lake, Bouteville Lake, Cawcot River, Gabriel Lake;
- West side: Eau Jaune Lake, Irene River, Obatogamau River.

== Toponymy ==
The hydronym "Obatogamau lakes" was formalized in the early 1960s.

In 1870, during Richardson's expedition, these lakes were already known. Albert Peter Low, in 1884 and 1895, and Henry O'Sullivan, the same year, use the spellings Lake Obatigoman (1884), Lake Obatogaman (1884), Lake Obatagoman (1895) and Lake Obatagomau (1895). The 1904 Fifth Report of the Geographic Board of Canada, published in Ottawa, 1905, page 46, states: "Obatogamau; Lake, Chibougamau Lake, Abitibi District, Que.".

Of Cree origin, the term obatogamau means "lake with multiple straits or constricted by wood, vegetation".

In 1910, the Hudson's Bay Company built on the eastern shore of Lake La Dauversière a cabin that will become over the years a place of storage. Finally this cabin was deserted. Originally known as "Lac-Obatogamau Deposit", this name will be standardized in the form of "Lac-Obatogamau Deposit", as a locality, in 1988.

This set of lakes is dotted with hundreds of islands most of which are still unnamed. The largest is Weaver Island; this denomination is in honor of Kenneth Weaver, pilot of the military aviation during the Second World War and friend of the geologist Paul Imbault, responsible for an expedition to this region in 1950. On this occasion, the geologist has assigned names for the different parts of this body of water are the lakes La Dauversière and Le Royer, named after the township named in honor of Jerome Le Royer of La Dauversière, one of the founders of the Compagnie de Saint-Sulpice in Lanaudière, Lake Verneuil and Chevrier Lake, commemorating Jean-Jacques Olier of Verneuil and Pierre Chevrier, Baron de Fancamp, two members of this company and Lake Holmes, in memory of Stanley Holmes, one of the assistants of geologist Imbault. The name "Lacs Obatogamau" was officialized on December 5, 1968 by the Commission de toponymie du Québec when it was created.

== See also ==
- Nottaway River, a watercourse
- Matagami Lake, a body of water
- Waswanipi River, a watercourse
- Obatogamau River, a watercourse
- Nemenjiche River, a watercourse
- Eeyou Istchee Baie-James (Municipality), a municipality
- List of lakes in Canada
