= Eau Jaune Lake =

- Watershed of Nottaway River

- Location within Quebec
- Location: Eeyou Istchee Baie-James
- Coordinates: 49°38′32″N 74°41′54″W
- Type: Natural
- Primary inflows: Obatogamau River
- Primary outflows: Obatogamau River
- Basin countries: Canada
- Max. length: 13.1 kilometres (8.1 mi)
- Max. width: 11.2 kilometres (7.0 mi)
- Surface area: 37 kilometres (23 mi)
- Surface elevation: 365 metres (1,198 ft)

The Eau Jaune Lake (English: Yellow Water Lake) is a freshwater body of the Eeyou Istchee Baie-James, in Jamésie, in the administrative region of Nord-du-Québec, province of Quebec, in Canada. This lake extends entirely into the townships of Brongniart and Rasles.

Forestry is the main economic activity of the sector. Recreational tourism activities come second.

The Eastern part of the "Eau Jaune Lake" hydrographic slope is accessible by a forest road from the North separating from route 113 which runs East-West to the North of the lake along the Canadian National Railway.

The surface of the "Eau Jaune Lake" is usually frozen from early November to mid-May, however, safe ice circulation is generally from mid-November to mid-April.

== Geography ==
This lake, which is located Southwest of Chibougamau Lake has a length of 13.1 kilometres (8.1 mi), a maximum width of 11.2 kilometres (7.0 mi) and an altitude of 365 metres (1,198 ft).

Of a complex configuration, the "Eau Jaune Lake" has many islands, bays and peninsulas. This lake is crossed from east to west by the Obatogamau River (tributary of the Chibougamau River). It is also fed on the North side by the Erwin Lake outlet, the Andy Lake outlet and the Agglomerate Lake outlet. The mouth of the "Lac à l'Eau Jaune", which is more flared, is located at the bottom of a bay in the North-West, namely:

- 20.0 kilometres (12.4 mi) South-West of a bay on the South shore of Chibougamau Lake;
- 34.7 kilometres (21.6 mi) South-West of downtown Chibougamau;
- 13.4 kilometres (8.3 mi) Southeast of the village center of Chapais, Quebec;
- 58.2 kilometres (36.2 mi) East of the mouth of the Obatogamau River (confluence with the Chibougamau River);
- 159.3 kilometres (99.0 mi) Northeast of the mouth of Goéland Lake (Waswanipi River);
- 346 kilometres (215 mi) Southeast of the mouth of the Nottaway River.

The main hydrographic slopes near the "Eau Jaune Lake" are:

- North side: Obatogamau River, Opémisca Lake, Chibougamau River, Chibougamau Lake;
- East side: Keith Lake, Muscocho Lake, Obatogamau River, Chevrier Lake;
- South side: Opawica River, Fancamp Lake, Nemenjiche Lake, Nemenjiche River;
- West side: Presqu'île Lake (Nord-du-Québec), Obatogamau River, Chibougamau River.

== Toponymy ==
This hydronym was reported in 1916 in minutes of the Quebec Geography Commission. Presumably, this descriptive toponym borrows its name from the color of water. In 1900, explorer Henry O'Sullivan, who mapped this lake without naming it, indicated that the surrounding soil contained ferrous deposits.

The toponym "Lac à l'Eau Jaune" was officialized on December 5, 1968 by the Commission de toponymie du Québec during its creation.

== See also ==
- James Bay
- Nottaway River, a watercourse
- Lake Matagami, a body of water
- Waswanipi River, a watercourse
- Chibougamau River, a watercourse
- Obatogamau River, a watercourse
- Eeyou Istchee Baie-James, a municipality
- List of lakes in Canada
