= Nemenjiche River =

Nemenjiche
- Watershed of Nottaway River

Location
- Country: Canada
- Province: Quebec
- Region: Nord-du-Québec

Physical characteristics
- Source: Nemenjiche Lake
  - location: Eeyou Istchee Baie-James, Nord-du-Québec, Quebec
  - coordinates: 49°25′59″N 74°27′18″W
  - elevation: 394 m (1,293 ft)
- Mouth: Obatogamau Lakes
  - location: Eeyou Istchee Baie-James, Nord-du-Québec, Quebec
  - coordinates: 49°48′20″N 75°30′21″W
  - elevation: 365 m (1,198 ft)
- Length: 17.4 km (10.8 mi)

The Nemenjiche River is a tributary of Obatogamau Lakes, flowing into the Regional County Municipality (RCM) of Eeyou Istchee Baie-James, into the administrative region of Nord-du-Québec, in the province of Quebec, in Canada. The course of the river crosses the townships of Robert, Rohault, Gamache and Dauversière.

The Eastern side of the Nemenjiche River hydrographic slope is accessible by a forest road (North-South direction) that separates from route 113 which links Lebel-sur-Quévillon to Chibougamau. The West side is served by the R1032 road that goes North to the South of Lake Fancamp.

The surface of the Nemenjiche River is usually frozen from early November to mid-May, however, safe ice circulation is generally from mid-November to mid-April.

== Geography ==
The main hydrographic slopes near the Nemenjiche River are:
- North side: Obatogamau Lakes including La Dauversière Lake, Le Royer Lake, Chibougamau River;
- East side: Normandin River, Coquille River, Rohault Lake, Thunder River;
- South side: Gabriel Lake, Opawica River, Cowcot River;
- West side: Opawica River, Caopatina Lake, Surprise Lake, Irene River.

The Nemenjiche River originates at the mouth of Nemenjiche Lake (length: 6.0 kilometres (3.7 mi) altitude: 394 metres (1,293 ft)) which extends into the townships of Robert and Rohault. This lake is located at 0.7 kilometres (0.43 mi) on the west side of the demarcation line between the Regional County Municipality (RCM) of Le Domaine-du-Roy and the Eeyou Istchee Baie-James; this demarcation constitutes the watershed between the James Bay side and the Lac Saint-Jean slope.

Of elongated shape in the North-South direction, this lake comprises about forty islands. It is supplied by the North by the discharge of a few small unidentified lakes and by the West by five unidentified lakes. The mouth of Lake Nemenjiche is located at:

- 4.9 kilometres (3.0 mi) West of Rohault Lake;
- 11.2 kilometres (7.0 mi) South of Nemenjiche Bay of Obatogamau Lakes;
- 35.1 kilometres (21.8 mi) Southeast of the mouth of the Eau Jaune Lake (English: Lake of the Yellow Water) of Obatogamau Lakes;
- 86.3 kilometres (53.6 mi) East of the mouth of the Obatogamau River (confluence with the Chibougamau River);
- 183.5 kilometres (114.0 mi) East of the mouth of Goéland Lake (Waswanipi River);
- 21.0 kilometres (13.0 mi) Southwest of the Canadian National Railway and route 167; these two parallel tracks link Saint-Félicien, Quebec to Chibougamau;
- 47.4 kilometres (29.5 mi) Southeast of the village center of Chapais, Quebec;
- 54.3 kilometres (33.7 mi) Southeast of downtown Chibougamau;
- 379.5 kilometres (235.8 mi) Southeast of the mouth of the Nottaway River.

From its source (mouth of Lake Nemenjiche), the "Nemenjiche River" flows on 17.4 kilometres (10.8 mi) according to the following segments:

- 1.3 kilometres (0.81 mi) westerly to the limit of Gamache Township, passing north of a mountain with a peak of 474 metres (1,555 ft);
- 8.3 kilometres (5.2 mi) to the North in marsh zone and overlapping the demarcation of the townships of Gamache and Rohault;
- 1.9 kilometres (1.2 mi) Northeast, to the southern limit of the township of La Dauversière;
- 5.9 kilometres (3.7 mi) North to mouth.

The Nemenjiche River flows to the bottom of a narrow bay of Nemenjiche Bay on the southern shore of Obatogamau Lakes. From this mouth, the current flows northwest to the Obatogamau Lakes to the mouth of the Eau Jaune Lake (English: "Yellow Water Lake"). From there, the current flows towards the South-West by taking the course of the Obatogamau River, then towards the Southwest along the Chibougamau River to the East shore of Goéland Lake (Waswanipi River). This last one is crossed to the Northwest by the Waswanipi River which is a tributary of Matagami Lake.

The mouth of the Nemenjiche River is located at:

- 27.4 kilometres (17.0 mi) Southeast of the mouth of Eau Jaune Lake (English: "Yellow Water Lake") of Obatogamau Lakes;
- 82.8 kilometres (51.4 mi) East of the mouth of the Obatogamau River (confluence with the Chibougamau River);
- 11.6 kilometres (7.2 mi) Northeast of the mouth of the Chibougamau River (confluence with the Opawica River);
- 182 kilometres (113 mi) East of the mouth of Goéland Lake (Waswanipi River);
- 40.8 kilometres (25.4 mi) Southeast of the village center of Chapais, Quebec;
- 42.8 kilometres (26.6 mi) South of downtown Chibougamau.

== Toponymy ==
The toponym "Rivière Nemenjiche" was formalized on December 5, 1968, at the Commission de toponymie du Québec, i.e. at the creation of this commission.

== See also ==
- James Bay
- Rupert Bay
- Nottaway River, a watercourse
- Matagami Lake, a body of water
- Waswanipi River, a watercourse
- Goéland Lake (Waswanipi River), a body of water
- Lake Waswanipi, a body of water
- Chibougamau River, a watercourse
- Obatogamau River, a watercourse
- Obatogamau Lakes, a body of water
- Nemenjiche Lake, a body of water
- Eeyou Istchee Baie-James
- List of rivers of Quebec
