= Presqu'île Lake (Nord-du-Québec) =

Lake in Nord-du-Québec, Quebec, Canada

Presqu’île Lake
- Watershed of Nottaway River

- Location within Quebec
- Location: Baie-James
- Coordinates: 49°42′49″N 74°50′22″W
- Type: Natural
- Primary inflows: Obatogamau River
- Primary outflows: Obatogamau River
- Basin countries: Canada
- Max. length: 5.9 kilometres (3.7 mi)
- Max. width: 5.6 kilometres (3.5 mi)
- Surface area: 20 kilometres (12 mi)
- Surface elevation: 354 metres (1,161 ft)
- Islands: 28

The Presqu'île Lake (French: Lac de la Presqu’île) is a body of water forming a lake at 5.4 kilometres (3.4 mi) South of the center of the village Chapais, in the regional County Municipality (RCM) of Eeyou Istchee Baie-James, in the administrative region of Nord-du-Quebec, in Quebec, in Canada. This body of water straddles the townships of Lévy, de Brongniart, and Brochant.

The northern part of the lake is served by a forest road from the village of Chapais and stands out from route 113.

The surface of the “Presqu’île Lake” is usually frozen from early November to mid-May, however, safe ice circulation is generally from mid-November to mid-April.

== Geography ==
The Presqu'île lake took place inside the Presqu'île crater, crater impact of meteorite dating from Cambrian.

The horseshoe-shaped lake measures 5.9 kilometres (3.7 mi) of length by 5.6 kilometres (3.5 mi) wide and covers an area of about 20 square kilometres (7.7 sq mi).

A moor of land advances on 3.6 kilometres (2.2 mi) towards the South-West either towards the middle of the lake, since the Northeastern shore, forming a peninsula with a width of 2.4 kilometres (1.5 mi) and thus giving its name to this Quebec lake.

Lake Presqu'île is crossed to the West by the Obatogamau River whose current bypasses the South the large peninsula that extends into the lake. This lake is also fed by the dump (coming from the South) draining in particular Lake Esox and three streams coming from the North, one of which drains the waters of Lake Muguet.

== Geology ==
On the banks of the Obatogamau River at 5 kilometres (3.1 mi) East of the lake, segments of shatter cones were found, traces left by the cosmic impact having formed the crater about 759 million years ago. These cones generally have a length of 10–20 centimetres (3.9–7.9 in) long; some reach 60 centimetres (24 in).

The original crater had an estimated diameter of at least 12 kilometres (7.5 mi). Today, the crater has a diameter of about 20 kilometres (12 mi). The topography of the surrounding terrain has undergone severe erosions resulting in gradual leveling of about 3,000 metres (9,800 ft) thickness during glacial periods. The surrounding hills contain crystalline rocks. The topography of the Canadian Shield in the Chibougamau region includes vast plateaus, marshy plains and old mountains of volcanic origins with worn summits. The composition of the Earth's crust is the result of the effect of ancient submarine volcanoes in tropical environments. Then, the ocean floor rose under the impact of the tectonic plates, forming the northern part of the Canadian Shield.

North of Opemiska Lake, ancient flows of "lava cushioned" and ancient "breaches" are still visible North. These geological formations were created as a result of the rapid cooling of the hot lava on contact with seawater.

== See also ==
- Nottaway River, a watercourse
- Matagami Lake, a body of water
- Waswanipi River, a watercourse
- Chibougamau River, a watercourse
- Obatogamau River, a watercourse
- Presqu'île crater
- Eeyou Istchee Baie-James, a municipality
- List of lakes in Canada
