= Obatogamau River =

Obatogamau
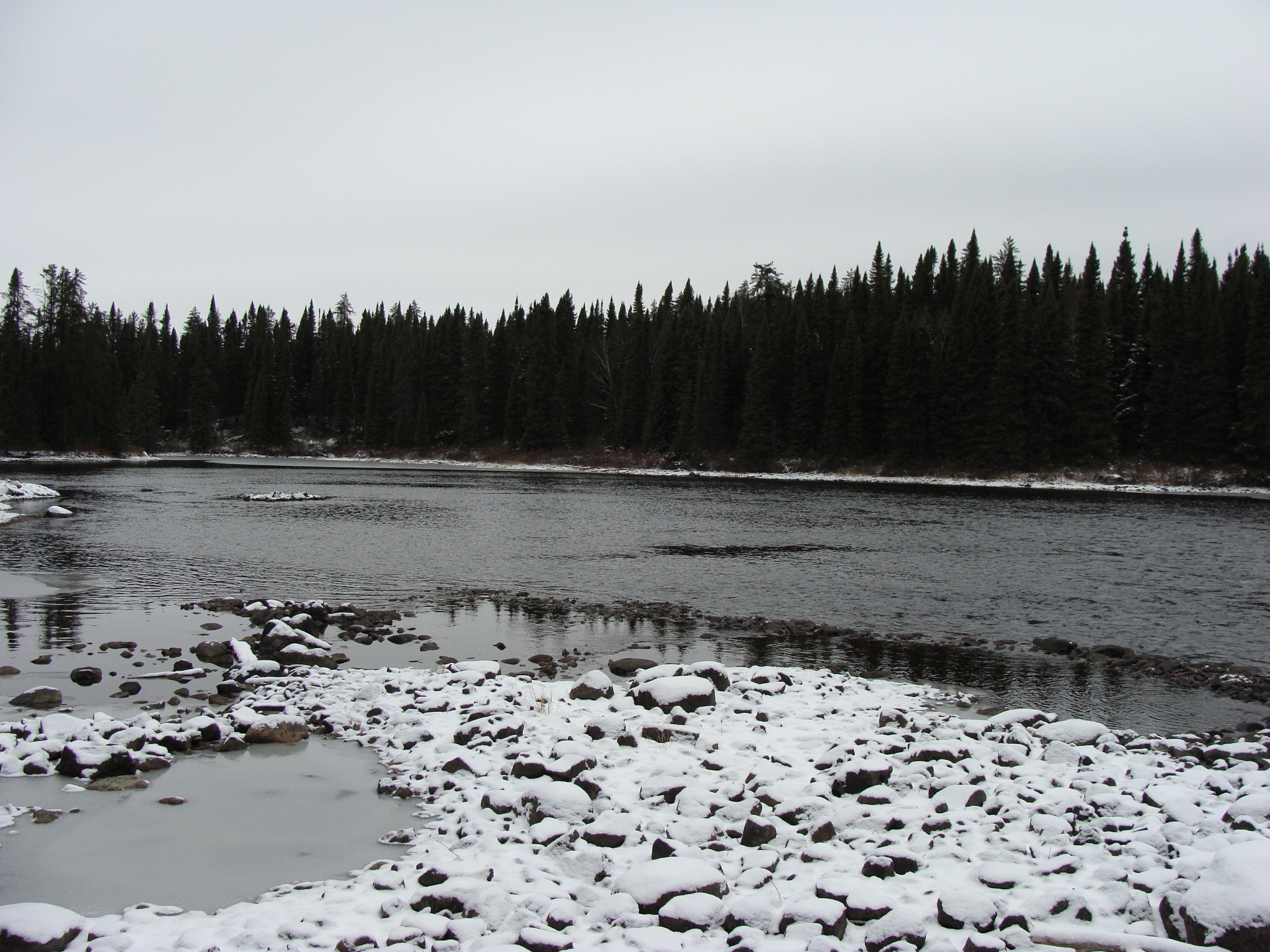

- Watershed of Nottaway River

Location
- Country: Canada
- Province: Quebec
- Region: Nord-du-Québec

Physical characteristics
- Source: Obatogamau Lakes
  - location: Eeyou Istchee Baie-James, Nord-du-Québec, Quebec
  - coordinates: 49°37′38″N 74°31′28″W
  - elevation: 365 m (1,198 ft)
- Mouth: Chibougamau River
  - location: Eeyou Istchee Baie-James, Nord-du-Québec, Quebec
  - coordinates: 49°48′20″N 75°30′21″W
  - elevation: 320 m (1,050 ft)
- Length: 130.7 km (81.2 mi)

Basin features
- Tributaries
  - left: (in upstream order); Mechamego (via Mechamego Lake); Discharge of Grenier Lake; Anville creek; Dickson creek; Nemenjiche River (via Obatogamau Lakes)
  - right: (in upstream order); Deux Orignaux River (via Society Lake); Dolomieu creek (draining Dolomieu Lake); Daubrée creek; discharge of lakes Beauchesne and Chrissie; discharge of Embryon Lake

The Obatogamau River is a tributary of the Chibougamau River, flowing into the Regional County Municipality (MRC) of Jamésie, in the Nord-du-Québec, in the province of Quebec, in Canada.

The lower and middle portions of the Obatogamau River hydrographic slope can be reached by route 113 which connects Lebel-sur-Quévillon to Chibougamau and the railway; while the northeast side of Obatogamau Lakes is accessible via route 167 and the railway. This road follows in part the valley of the Obatogamau River.

The surface of the Obatogamau River is usually frozen from early November to mid-May, however, safe ice circulation is generally from mid-November to mid-April.

== Geography ==
The main hydrographic slopes near the Obatogamau River are:
- North side: Chibougamau River, Merrill Lake, Opémisca Lake;
- East side: Boisvert River, Chevrier Lake;
- South side: Rohault Lake, Nemenjiche River;
- West side: Chibougamau River, Inconnu Lake, Opawica Lake, Wachigabau Lake.

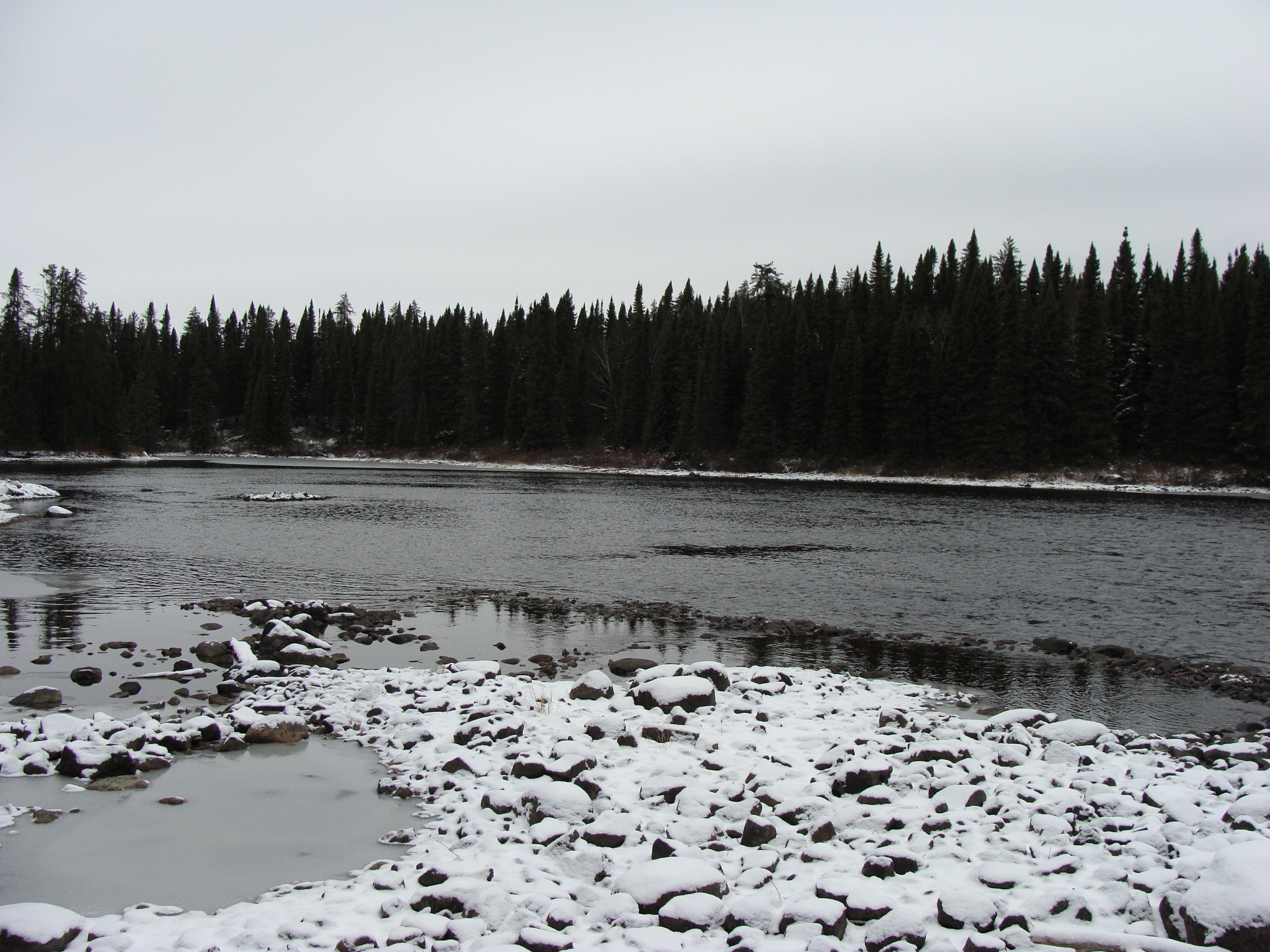
Rivière Obatogamau

The Obatogamau River rises at the mouth of the Obatogamau Lakes (length:19.6 kilometres (12.2 mi), altitude: 365 metres (1,198 ft)). This lake is located on the East side of a forest road (North-South direction), West of Lake Verneuil (link through the Verneuil pass) and Lake Royer. Complex in shape, the Obatogamau lakes has about a hundred islands, many bays (the largest of which is Anderson Bay) and peninsulas. The mouth of this lake is located at:

- 11.6 kilometres (7.2 mi) South of a bay of Chibougamau Lake;
- 174.6 kilometres (108.5 mi) Northeast of the mouth of Goéland Lake (Waswanipi River);
- 15.1 kilometres (9.4 mi) South-West of the railway of Canadian National Railway connecting Saint-Félicien, Quebec to Chibougamau;
- 29.3 kilometres (18.2 mi) Southeast of the village center of Chapais, Quebec;
- 34.1 kilometres (21.2 mi) South of downtown Chibougamau;
- 364 kilometres (226 mi) Southeast of the mouth of the Nottaway River;

From its source (mouth of Obatogamau Lakes), the Obatogamau River flows over 130.7 kilometres (81.2 mi) according to the following segments:

Upper part of the Obatogamau River (segment of 34.1 kilometres (21.2 mi)) Townships crossed: Fancamp, Haüy, Brongniarat and Brochant.

- 5.3 kilometres (3.3 mi) North in Fancamp Township, then Haüy Township by cutting a forest road to a river bend;
- 4.0 kilometres (2.5 mi) southwesterly in Haüy Township, then returning to Fancamp Township to a bay Southeast of Muscocho Lake;
- 10.5 kilometres (6.5 mi) North, then South-West, crossing Muscocho Lake (altitude: 365 metres (1,198 ft)) on its full length;
- 2.9 kilometres (1.8 mi) southwesterly, crossing Keith Lake (length: 4.3 kilometres (2.7 mi); altitude: 365 metres (1,198 ft));
- 11.4 kilometres (7.1 mi) to the West, crossing the “Lac à l’Eau Jaune” (English: lake of Yellow Water) (length: 18.6 kilometres (11.6 mi); altitude: 365 metres (1,198 ft));

Intermediate part of the Obatogamau River (segment of 53.8 kilometres (33.4 mi)) Townships crossed: De Brochant and D'Anville.

- 8.0 kilometres (5.0 mi) Northwesterly to the West shore of a bay in Presqu'île Lake (Nord-du-Québec);
- 6.8 kilometres (4.2 mi) passing South of the major peninsula advancing from Northeast shore, then West through Presqu'île Lake (Nord-du-Québec) (length: 5.7 kilometres (3.5 mi); altitude: 354 metres (1,161 ft));
- 20.0 kilometres (12.4 mi) Westwards in the canton of Brochant forming two large curves towards the North, the first of which makes a passage in the canton of Lévy and the second in the canton of Daubrée, until a stream (coming from the South);
- 19.0 kilometres (11.8 mi) at first North to Daubrée Township, then southwesterly returning to Brochant Township, crossing marsh areas and along (on the South side) the railway to Dickson Creek (from the South) draining the waters of Dickson Lake;

Lower part of the Obatogamau River (segment of 42.8 kilometres (26.6 mi)) Townships crossed: D'Anville, Dolomieu and Saussure.

- 22.5 kilometres (14.0 mi) Westerly to the outlet of Lake Society, which receives on the North side the waters of Lac des Miserables and the Deux Orignaux River (English: Two Mooses River);
- 1.4 kilometres (0.87 mi) Southwesterly in a marsh zone to the mouth of Lake Mechamego whose current crosses the Northern part at 0.5 kilometres (0.31 mi);
- 7.6 kilometres (4.7 mi) Westerly, forming a curve to the North, to the mouth of “Lac du Coeur” (English: Lake Heart) while the current flows through the North on 0.4 kilometres (0.25 mi);
- 11.3 kilometres (7.0 mi) Westward forming three curves to the North to its mouth.

The Obatogamau River flows on the Southeastern shore of the Chibougamau River; this mouth is located nearby (southwest side) of the route 113 bridge spanning the Chibougamau River. From this mouth, the current flows southwest along the Chibougamau River on 41.4 kilometres (25.7 mi) to its mouth, which is the confluence with the Opawica River. From there, the current flows generally westward through the Waswanipi River to the East shore of Goéland Lake (Waswanipi River). The latter is crossed to the Northwest by the Waswanipi River which is a tributary of Matagami Lake.

The mouth of the Obatogamau River is located at:

- 35.5 kilometres (22.1 mi) Northeast of the mouth of the Chibougamau River (confluence with the Opawica River);
- 101.8 kilometres (63.3 mi) Northeast of the mouth of Goéland Lake (Waswanipi River);
- 121.2 kilometres (75.3 mi) Southwestern of the mouth of Olga Lake (Waswanipi River);
- 30.2 kilometres (18.8 mi) Northeast of the village center of Waswanipi;
- 82.4 kilometres (51.2 mi) Southeast of downtown Chibougamau.

== Toponymy ==
This hydronym is indicated on a map of 1941. Of Cree origin, the term "Obatogamau" means "tightened by wood, vegetation". This hydronym is indicated in the "Fifth Report of the Geographic Board of Canada 1904", published in Ottawa in 1905, page 46: "Obatogamau; South Lake Chibougamau Lake, Abitibi District, Que.

The toponym "Obatogamau River" was formalized on December 5, 1968, at the Commission de toponymie du Quebec, i.e. at the creation of this commission

== See also ==
- James Bay
- Rupert Bay
- Nottaway River, a watercourse
- Matagami Lake, a body of water
- Waswanipi River, a watercourse
- Goéland Lake (Waswanipi River), a body of water
- Lake Waswanipi, a body of water
- Chibougamau River, a watercourse
- Presqu'île Lake (Nord-du-Québec), a body of water
- Eau Jaune Lake, a body of water
- List of rivers of Quebec
