= Albert Peter Low =

Canadian geologist, explorer and athlete

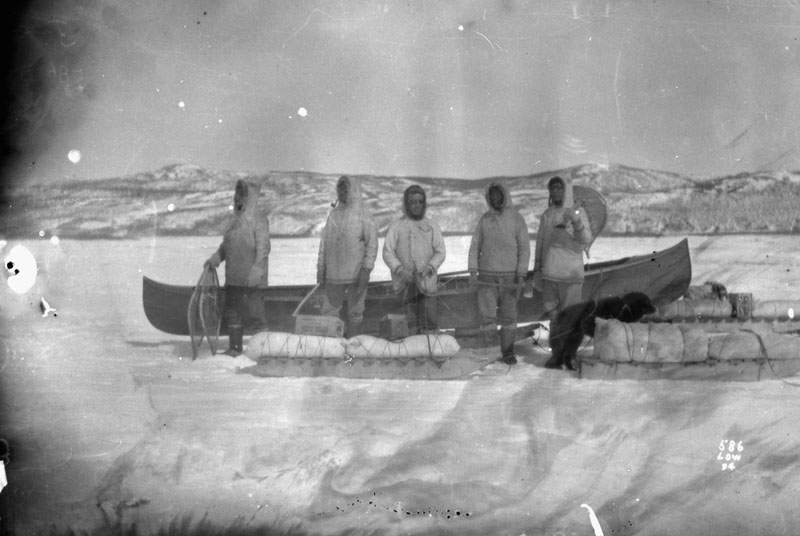
- A.P. Low and party on a hauling picnic up Lake Winokapau, Hamilton River (now the Churchill River), Labrador, 1894.
- Born: May 24, 1861; Montreal, Canada East
- Died: October 9, 1942 (aged 81); Ottawa, Ontario, Canada
- Education: McGill University
- Occupations: geologist, explorer and athlete
- Known for: Arctic explorations of 1893–1895

Albert Peter Low (May 24, 1861 – October 9, 1942) was a Canadian geologist, explorer and athlete. His explorations of 1893–1895 were important in declaring Canada's sovereignty over the Arctic, and eventually defining the border between Quebec and Labrador.

== Biography ==
Albert Peter Low was born in Montreal, Canada East, and attended McGill University, graduating in 1882. He moved to Ottawa, Ontario to work as a surveyor and explorer with the Geological Survey of Canada. Low was recognized by senior officials for his excellent work and handed a series of scientific assignments in the North. Although his career is dotted with distinguished work, Low is perhaps best remembered as the commander of a 1903-04 Dominion expedition to declare Canada's authority over the Arctic, a journey that resulted in a bestselling book, The Cruise of the Neptune. In 1906, he was appointed director of the Geological Survey of Canada. In 1907, he became the first deputy minister of the Department of Mines. He retired from the department in 1913. He died in Ottawa in 1942.

Low was also an athlete, and he played ice hockey for two famous teams, the McGill University Hockey Club, considered the first organized hockey club in the world, and the Ottawa Hockey Club. In 1883, he played goaltender for the victorious McGill Hockey Club in the 1883 Montreal Winter Carnival. The championship is considered the first Canadian championship. After moving to Ottawa in 1883, he was a founding member of the Ottawa Hockey Club, formed within weeks of the 1883 tournament. In 1884, he would return to the Montreal Winter Carnival tournament as Ottawa's goaltender and shutout McGill. He was a member of the Ottawa Hockey Club until 1889.

Aplowite, which is a transparent, pink-coloured cobalt mineral, is named in his honour, as is A. P. Low Primary School in Labrador City, NL.
