= Chibougamau Lake =

Lake in Quebec, Canada

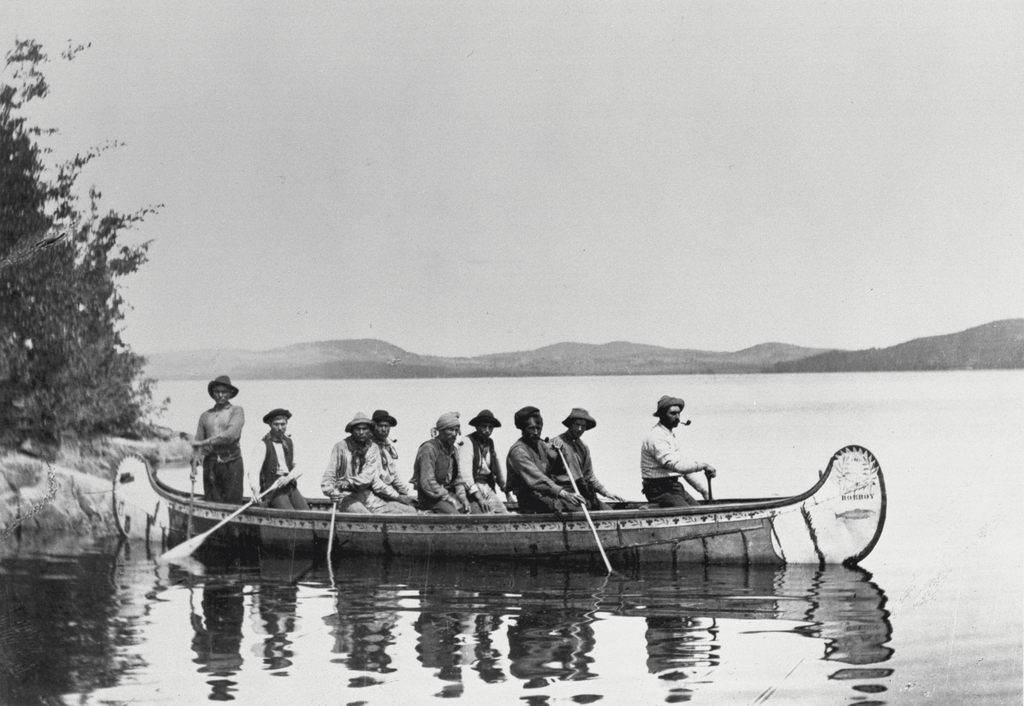
- Albert Peter Low's Expedition, 1892

- Location within Quebec
- Location: Baie-James
- Coordinates: 49°50′08″N 74°13′47″W
- Type: Natural
- Primary inflows: Blondeau River, France River, Nepton River, Énard River
- Primary outflows: Chibougamau River
- Basin countries: Canada
- Max. length: 35.0 kilometres (21.7 mi)
- Max. width: 15.2 kilometres (9.4 mi)
- Surface area: 206 kilometres (128 mi)
- Surface elevation: 379 metres (1,243 ft)
- Settlements: Chibougamau

Chibougamau Lake is a freshwater body of the municipality of Chibougamau, in the administrative region of Nord-du-Québec, in province of Quebec, in Canada.

The surface of Chibougamau Lake is usually frozen from early November to mid-May, however, safe ice circulation is generally from mid-November to mid-April.

== Geography ==
Covering an area of 206 square kilometres (80 sq mi), Lake Chibougamau is located about ten kilometers southeast of the town of the same name, 5.9 kilometres (3.7 mi) east of the summit of the Tower Mountain (644 metres (2,113 ft)) and 185 kilometres (115 mi) northwest of Lac Saint-Jean. With a length of 35 kilometres (22 mi) (in the north-south direction) and 15.2 kilometres (9.4 mi) in maximum width, this lake is the source of the Chibougamau River.

Neighboring slopes

The surrounding hydrographic slopes of Lake Chibougamau are:

- North side: Waconichi Lake;
- East side: Boisvert River;
- South side: Obatogamau Lakes and Eau Jaune Lake;
- West side: Bourbeau Lake, Chibougamau River, Opémisca Lake and the Obatogamau River.

Islands

Of an irregular shape, Lake Chibougamau is dotted with dozens of islands, the main ones are: Marguerite, Tommy, Boulder, Commissaires and Merrill. The secondary islands are: Okay, Refuge, Gordon, Dewar, Scott, Angover, Breakwater, Mermaid, Annie, Lorenzo, Rudolf, Arthur, Line Phony, Bark Letter, Graphite, Granite, Shatter, Labor Day, Lookout, Sioui, Stanislas, Needle, Martine, Francoise, Gabbro, Eugene, Henry, Last, Alphonse, Yvonne, Boulder and Take it Easy.

Main bays

Around the lake, the main bays are (in order clockwise, from the north): Magnetite, Bag, Islands, Finger, Nepton, Club, Girard, Sunday, Poitevin, Dufresne, Corner, Line, Third Bay, Second Bay, First Bay, Inlet, Dulieux, Queylus, Turnip Cove, Bug-in-a-Rug, Beginnings, Hematite, Machin, Valiquette, Bear, Cedar, Portage.

In his writings, explorer Henry O'Sullivan reports the gentle slope of the shores of the lake, interrupted to the north by the mountains of "The Wizard", Paint and Cummings. In 1895, this explorer indicated that "Shabokoma Lake" would have "a total length of 42 miles, a stretch of water somewhat surprising to have remained unknown until this day. "

Main tributaries

The main tributaries of Lake Chibougamau are: North Coast:

- France River (coming from the east) which flows to the bottom of McKenzie Bay from the north shore of the lake;
- Lymburner Lake (coming from the east) discharge into Gunn Bay;

East Coast :

- Robert Lake outlet, located northeast of the lake;
- Roberge Lake outlet, located northeast of the lake;
- Nepton River which empties into Nepton Bay;
- Forest Lake outlet, located northeast of the lake;
- Discharge from Jenozeau Lake flowing south to Girard Bay;
- Armitage River (from Lake Armitage) flowing north on the east side of the lake; it empties into Girard Bay (located northeast of the lake);

South side

- Lake Jacques discharge, discharging into Comer Bay;
- Énard River, draining Inlet Lake and discharging into Inlet Bay;

Western coast

- Wilson Lake Discharge (coming from the west and northwest); this lake flows into Lac Caché, located on the west side of Lake Chibougamau;
- Blondeau River, coming from the west and pouring into McKenzie Bay;

Mouth

The mouth of the lake is located on the west side, at the end of Commencement Bay. The water flows through the Rainbow Falls at the mouth of the lake (between the northern end of the Gouin Peninsula and the South-West end of Portage Island). Then, the current runs southwest through the North-East bay of Dorés Lake (Chibougamau River) (French: "Lac aux Dorés"), which in turn flows southwesterly through a short passage in the "Lac aux Dorés". The latter lake is in parallèle (southwest side) to Lake Chibougamau. Lac aux Dorés is separated from Chibougamau Lake by the Gouin Peninsula. The mouth of "Lac aux Dorés" is located to the south-west at the bottom of the Malouf bay.

The hamlet "Obalski" is located south of Chibougamau Lake, along the railway.

== Toponymy ==
In 1831, surveyor Joseph Bouchette uses the names "Utsissagomo" and "Vomiting Lake" to designate this large body of water. Confirmed as early as 1870, the presence of mineral resources raises interest in the region. In parallel, in the 19th century, recreational and tourism activities, including hunting and fishing, are highlighted.

In 1871, surveyor Walter McOuat noted: "We did not see anything similar to the chlorite schists of Chibogomou and Wakinitchee [Waconichi] lakes." In 1907, Joseph Obalski, Inspector of Mines of Quebec, uses the current graph "Lac Chibougamau".

The current spelling of the lake is in the Dictionary of Rivers and Lakes of the Province of Quebec (1914 and 1925). In 1914, the Hudson's Bay Company moved its deposit to Obatogamau Lakes. Finally, in 1942, the position will cease operations.

In the history, the writing of the lake knew several variants: Shabagamog, Shabugama, Shibogama, Shobokoma, Chibougamou, Chibogamo, Shobogoma, Chibougamoo, Shabogama, Chibiogouma.

The toponym Chibougamau Lake was formalized on December 5, 1968, at the Bank of Place Names of the Commission de toponymie du Québec.

== Mining ==
In the Lac Chibougamau area, some mining sites are located on the Gouin Peninsula and northwest of the lake, including Merrill Island. The railway from Saint-Félicien has contributed to the economic development of the region, particularly the mining and forestry sectors. This railway passes south of the lake and joins the village of Chibougamau located on the west side of the lake.

== See also ==
=== Related Articles ===
- Chibougamau, city
- Chibougamau River, a watercourse
- Courtois Lake (Jamésie), body of water
- Nord-du-Québec, administrative region of Quebec
- Saguenay-Lac-Saint-Jean, administrative region of Quebec
- List of lakes of Canada

=== External links ===
- Albert Peter Low (1881-1942)), geologist, he explored and mapped more than 12,000 km of harsh terrain in Labrador and northern Quebec in the late 1800s
- Official website of the city of Chibougamau (in English)
