= Dorés Lake =

- Watershed of Nottaway River

- Location within Quebec
- Location: Chibougamau
- Coordinates: 49°51′09″N 74°21′05″W
- Type: Natural
- Primary inflows: Discharge of "Lac à la Truite"; discharge of Stevenson Lake; discharge of Towle Lake; discharge of Surprenant Lake; discharge of Hélène-Mann and Jos-Mann Lakes; discharge of Demers and Bossum Lakes; discharge of Caché and Frontiersman lakes; discharge of Jeannine and Gabrielle Lakes; discharge of Castonguay Lake.
- Primary outflows: Chibougamau River
- Basin countries: Canada
- Max. length: 21.3 kilometres (13.2 mi)
- Max. width: 5.0 kilometres (3.1 mi)
- Surface area: 40 kilometres (25 mi)
- Surface elevation: 378 metres (1,240 ft)

The Lac aux Dorés (English: Dorés Lake) is a freshwater body in the city of Chibougamau, in Jamésie, in the administrative region of Nord-du-Québec, in the province of Quebec, at Canada. The surface of the lake extends into the townships of Roy, McKenzie, and Obalski.

Recreational tourism activities are the main economic activities of the sector; the mining industry, second.

The hydrographic slope of "Lac aux Dorés" is accessible on the west side by the forest road route 167 (linking Chibougamau to Saint-Félicien, Quebec), coming from the South, and connecting with route 113 (connecting Lebel-sur-Quévillon via Chapais. In this area, the railway of Canadian National goes along route 167.

The surface of "Lac aux Dorés" is usually frozen from early November to mid-May, however, safe ice circulation is generally from mid-November to mid-April.

== Geography ==
"Lake Dorés" is bounded on the east by the Gouin peninsula, which extends for about 12.0 kilometres (7.5 mi) north-east to its northeastern point; and Portage Island, which delimits its northeastern part. Chibougamau Lake (elevation: 379 m) is discharged through the Commencement Bay, located northwest of the latter lake. From there, the current flows through rapids between the Gouin Peninsula and Portage Island, to Hello Bay, which is an extension of the Bateman Bay, "Dorés Lake" (elevation: 378 metres (1,240 ft)).

"Dorés Lake" has a length of 21.3 kilometres (13.2 mi), a maximum width of 5.0 kilometres (3.1 mi) and an altitude of 378 metres (1,240 ft). The main bays are:

- North-East part: Hello (dump of Chibougamau Lake, Bateman, Dizon and Proulx;
- Central part: Cedard;
- Southwest part: Hidden, McQuade, Malouf, Guthrie and Ballicky.

The main islands are:

- Northeast part: Merrill Island;
- Central part: Hamel Island and Noll Island.

The mouth of "Lac aux Dorés" is located at the end of Malouof Bay in the southwestern part of the lake, namely:

- 4.8 kilometres (3.0 mi) south of the center of Obalski hamlet;
- 13.8 kilometres (8.6 mi) South of downtown Chibougamau;
- 32.4 kilometres (20.1 mi) east of the village center of Chapais, Quebec;
- 112.8 kilometres (70.1 mi) north-east of the mouth of the Chibougamau River (confluence with the Opawica River);
- 362 kilometres (225 mi) south-east of the mouth of the Nottaway River.

The main hydrographic slopes near the "Lac aux Dorés" are:

- North side: Gilman Lake, Bourbeau Lake, Chibougamau River;
- East side: Chibougamau Lake;
- South side: Chibougamau Lake, Chibougamau River, Énard River;
- West side: David Lake, Caché Lake, Simon Lake.
From the mouth of "Lac aux Dorés", is located southwest of the lake, where the current flows along the Chibougamau River.

== Toponymy ==
During the passage in this sector in 1870, a mining prospecting team, James Richardson then makes a summary description of this lake, without designating it toponymically.

At the beginning of the 20th century, gangs of the Cree community began to settle in the area. In 1901, surveyor Henry O'Sullivan wrote that this picturesque, gently sloping watercourse is surrounded by high mountains to the north and east. A few years later, several deposits of ore, copper, silver and gold were identified. As early as 1914, a publication reporting "Lac Doré" pointed out that its denomination is associated with the main species of fish that was fished there.

Especially since the 1930s and 1940s, the town of Chibougamau has developed a few kilometers to the northwest. Several mining sites have been exploited around the lake. Toponymic variant: Lac Obalski.

The toponym "Lac aux Dorés" was formalized on December 5, 1968, by the Commission de toponymie du Québec when it was created.

== See also ==
- James Bay
- Rupert Bay, a watercourse
- Nottaway River, a watercourse
- Matagami Lake, a body of water
- Waswanipi River, a watercourse
- Chibougamau River, a watercourse
- Chibougamau, a city
- List of lakes of Canada
