= Chibougamau River =

River in Quebec, Canada

Chibougamau
- Watershed of Nottaway River

Location
- Country: Canada
- Province: Quebec
- Region: Nord-du-Québec

Physical characteristics
- Source: Chibougamau Lake
  - location: Eeyou Istchee Baie-James
  - coordinates: 49°54′00″N 74°14′31″W
  - elevation: 379 m (1,243 ft)
- Mouth: Lake Waswanipi
  - location: Eeyou Istchee Baie-James
  - coordinates: 49°41′13″N 75°57′44″W
  - elevation: 276 m (906 ft)
- Length: 200 km (120 mi)
- Basin size: 1,170 km^{2} (450 sq mi)

Basin features
- Tributaries
  - left: (in upstream order); Obatogamau River; Sprinler creek; Loutre River
  - right: (in upstream order); Renault creek; Alouettes creek; Providence creek; Daladier creek; Brock River (Chibougamau River); Opémisca River; Leclerc creek; Barlow River; David creek

The Chibougamau River flows west in the Chibougamau, then Eeyou Istchee James Bay (municipality) in the administrative region of Nord-du-Québec, Quebec, Canada.

From the source, the course of the river successively crosses the townships of: Roy, McKenzie, O'Balski, Hauy, Scott, Barlow, Mckenzie, Blainlock, McKenzie, Barlow, Cuvier, Opemisca, Lamarck, Guettard, Saussure, Ribourde, Ronciere, Ribourde, Krieghoff and Gand.

The surface of the Iserhoff North River is usually frozen from early November to mid-May, however, safe ice circulation is usually from mid-November to mid-April.

== Geography ==
The surrounding hydrographic slopes of the Chibougamau River are:

- North side: Maicasagi River, Caupichigau River, Comencho Lake and Opataca Lake;
- East side: Chibougamau Lake, Obatogamau Lakes;
- South side: Opawica River and Obatogamau River;
- West side: Waswanipi River, Lake Waswanipi, Goéland Lake (Waswanipi River).

The head of the Chibougamau River hydrographic slope is located South of the Mistassini Lake.

The Chibougamau Lake is the main source of the Chibougamau River, which flows more than 200 km to the west in complex zigzags. The mouth of Chibougamau Lake flows westward into Lac aux Dorés, located southeast of the town of Chibougamau. The mouth of "Lac aux Dorés" is located at the bottom of a bay south of the lake in Obalski Township.

Flowing south, the Chibougamau River flares out to form Merrill Lake, then the river waters Scott Township to the north. On its irregular course, the river crosses successively 12 lakes: Ledden, David, Dulieux, Simon, Scott, Acinitchibastat, Gwillim, Chevrillon, Rush, Barlow, Opémisca and Michwacho.

At its mouth, the Chibougamau River converges with the Opawica River (coming from the southeast) to form the Waswanipi River. This point of convergence is just upstream of the Waswanipi River bridge on road 113 connecting Chapais with Lebel-sur-Quévillon. The village of Waswanipi is located near the mouth of the two rivers on the north bank of the Chibougamau River.

On its route, the river drains in particular the area of establishment Cri de Oujé-Bougoumou, located on the north shore of Lake Opémisca. This hamlet is 16.3 km (in a direct line) North of the village of Chapais. The summit of Mount Opémisca (540 metres (1,770 ft)) is located 1.6 kilometres (0.99 mi) North of Opémisca Lake and 4.8 kilometres (3.0 mi) Northwest of Cri de Oujé-Bougoumou.

After crossing Michwacho, the Chibougamau River branches North and West to bypass the Michwacho Mountains (384 metres (1,260 ft)), Roy (492 metres (1,614 ft)), "of the Solitary Sentinel"(390 metres (1,280 ft)) and the Pachyderm Hills (361 metres (1,184 ft)).

== Toponymy ==
In 1816 James Clouston of the Hudson's Bay Company drew a map of the area, which refers to the name "Capacomou River" to refer to the Chibougamau River.

The toponym Chibougamau River was formalized on December 5, 1968, at the Bank of place names of the Commission de toponymie du Quebec, when it was created.

== See also ==
- Chibougamau, a city
- Chapais, a municipality
- Chibougamau Lake, a body of water
- Opawica Lake, a body of water
- Opawica River, a watercourse
- Waswanipi River, a watercourse
- Obatogamau River, a watercourse
- Waswanipi, a village Cree
- Eeyou Istchee Baie-James (municipality), a municipality
- Jamésie
- List of rivers of Quebec
