= Eeyou Istchee James Bay =

Eeyou Istchee James Bay Eeyou Istchee Baie-James ᐄᔨᔨᐤ ᐊᔅᒌ ᒉᐃᒥᔅ ᐯᐃ
- Municipality
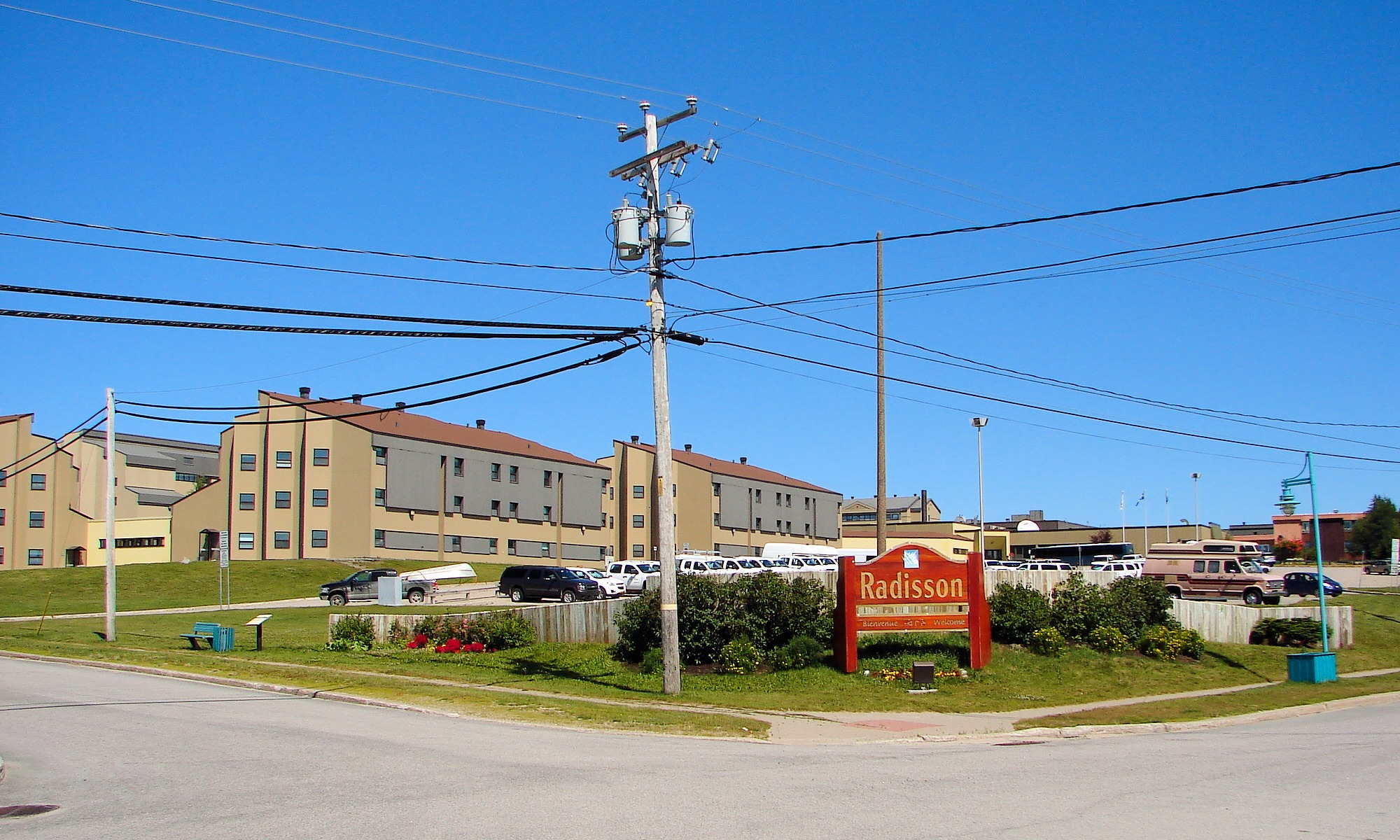

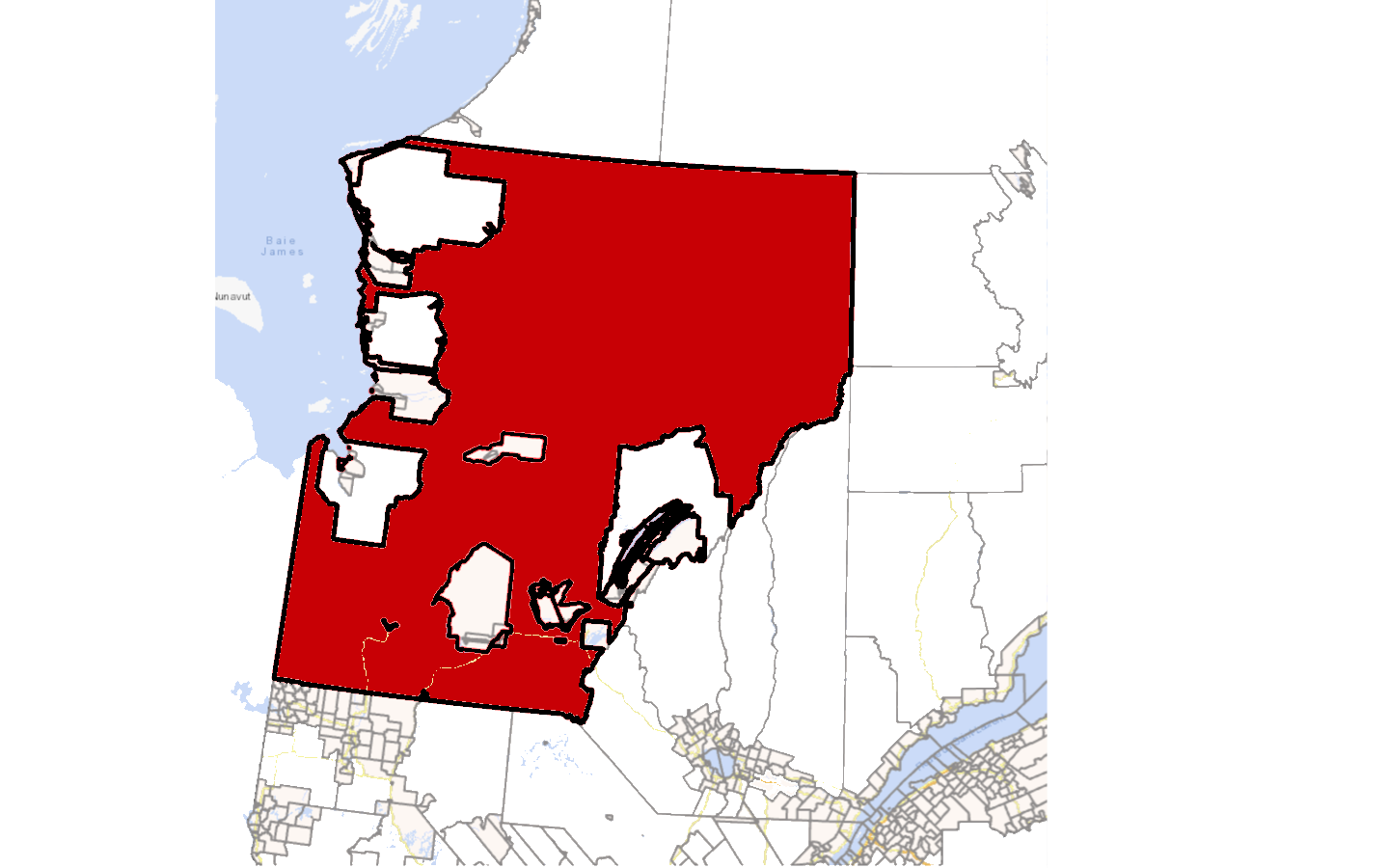
- Location within Jamésie

- Location in Quebec Eeyou Istchee James Bay (Canada)
- Coordinates: 49°45′23″N 77°37′49″W
- Country: Canada
- Province: Quebec
- Region: Nord-du-Québec
- Equivalent territory: Jamésie
- Constituted: July 14, 1971

Government
  - Type: Regional government
  - President: Guy Lafrenière
  - Federal riding: Abitibi—Baie-James—Nunavik—Eeyou
  - Prov. riding: Ungava

Area
  - Total: 274,623.30 km^{2} (106,032.65 sq mi)
  - Land: 283,123.42 km^{2} (109,314.56 sq mi)
- There is an apparent contradiction between two authoritative sources

Population (2021)
  - Total: 2,638
  - Density: 0/km^{2} (0/sq mi)
  - Pop (2016–21): ▲67.1%
  - Dwellings: 1,331
- Time zone: UTC−05:00 (EST)
  - Summer (DST): UTC−04:00 (EDT)
- Postal code: J0Y 1H0, J0Y 2B0, J0Y 2X0, J0Z 1H0, J0Z 3S0, J0Z 3V0
- Area code: 819
- Highways: R-109; R-111; R-113; R-167; R-393
- Website: https://greibj-eijbrg.ca/

Eeyou Istchee James Bay (French: Eeyou Istchee Baie-James, Cree: ᐄᔨᔨᐤ ᐊᔅᒌ ᒉᐃᒥᔅ ᐯᐃ iiyiyiw aychii cheimiy pei) is a local municipality in the Jamésie (TE) in administrative region of Nord-du-Québec. Located to the east of James Bay, Eeyou Istchee James Bay covers 283,123.42 km^{2} (109,314.56 sq mi) of land, making it the largest incorporated municipality in Canada — only eight unorganized territories are larger. Its territory covers almost entirely the Equivalent territory of Jamésie.

The hydroelectric power plants of the La Grande Complex are all located within the municipal boundaries of Eeyou Istchee James Bay, making the municipality strategically important to Quebec's energy policy. Other important economic sectors are mining, softwood logging, forestry, and tourism.

== History ==
The municipality of Baie-James was created in 1971 and was run by the board of directors of the Société de développement de la Baie James. It managed the territory of the James Bay and Northern Quebec Agreement between the 49th and 55th parallel, with the exception of the Cree Category 1 lands and the enclaves of Chapais, Chibougamau, Lebel-sur-Quévillon and Matagami.

In December 2001, the municipal council was reformed. It became a municipality of a special type directed by the mayors of the four enclave towns, as well as the chairpersons of the local community councils of Radisson, Valcanton and Villebois. An eighth seat was reserved for a representative coming from the non-urban territory. The municipality gained additional authority and could exert certain powers as a regional county.

On July 24, 2012, the Quebec government signed an accord with the Cree (Agreement on Governance in the Eeyou Istchee James Bay Territory between the Crees of Eeyou Istchee and the Gouvernement du Québec) which resulted in the replacement of the municipality of Baie-James by the municipality of Eeyou Istchee James Bay. The agreement came into force on January 1, 2014, and is designed to give the Cree expanded powers over lands and resources outside of the Cree municipalities and associated reserved land. The new government consist of Cree and Baie-James residents each having an equal number of votes within the Eeyou Istchee James Bay Regional Government.

== Geography ==
Eeyou Istchee James Bay, extends from the eastern shore of James Bay to the Otish Mountains of the Laurentian Plateau, its mainly composed of the boreal forest. The municipality comprises all lands of Jamésie (TE) minus the four municipalities of Chibougamau, Lebel-sur-Quévillon, Chapais, and Matagami. However, the territory includes four unconstituted localities (localités):

- Radisson
- Valcanton
- Val-Paradis
- Villebois

== Demographics ==
Canada census – Eeyou Istchee Baie-James community profile

| | 2021 | 2016 | 2011 |
| Population | 2,638 (+67.1% from 2016) | 1,589 (21.9% from 2011) | 1,303 (-6.5% from 2006) |
| Land area | 283,123.42 km^{2} (109,314.56 sq mi) | 297,355.46 km^{2} (114,809.58 sq mi) | 297,332.84 km^{2} (114,800.85 sq mi) |
| Population density | 0/km^{2} (0/sq mi) | 0.0/km^{2} (0/sq mi) | 0.0/km^{2} (0/sq mi) |
| Median age | 34.4 (M: 33.2, F: 35.6) | 42.5 (M: 42.5, F: 42.5) | 44.8 (M: 45.6, F: 43.4) |
| Private dwellings | 1,331 (total) 906 (occupied) | 903 (total) | 701 (total) |
| Median household income | $91,000 | $62,528 | $61,770 |

References: 2021 2016 2011

Historical census populations – Eeyou Istchee James Bay, Quebec

| Year | Pop. | ±% |
|---|---|---|
| 1976 | 4,079 | — |
| 1981 | 4,735 | +16.1% |
| 1986 | 2,869 | −39.4% |
| 1991 | 3,073 | +7.1% |
| 1996 | 1,978 | −35.6% |

| Year | Pop. | ±% |
|---|---|---|
| 2001 | 1,422 | −28.1% |
| 2006 | 1,394 | −2.0% |
| 2011 | 1,303 | −6.5% |
| 2016 | 1,589 | +21.9% |
| 2021 | 2,638 | +66.0% |

Source: Statistics Canada

The language statistics are as follows (as of the 2021 Census): 48% of Eeyou Istchee James Bay speak French as their first language, 9% speak English as their first language, 0.2% speak both French and English as a first language and 34% have a different first language

== Government ==
- People: Eeyou / Eenou ᐄᔨᔫ / ᐄᓅ
- Language: Eeyou / Eenou Ayimūn ᐄᔨᔫ / ᐄᓅ ᐊᔨᒨᓐ
- Country: Eeyou / Eenou Istchee ᐄᔨᔫ / ᐄᓅ ᐊᔅᒌ

Eeyou Istchee James Bay Regional Government (French: Gouvernement régional d’Eeyou Istchee Baie-James, Cree: ᐄᔨᔨᐤ ᐊᔅᒌ ᒉᐃᒥᔅ ᐯᐃ ᐊᔅᒌᐤ ᑎᐹᔨᐦᒋᒑᐎᓐ iiyiyiw aychii cheimiy pei aychiiw tipaayihchichaawin) is the administrative body in charge of Eeyou Istchee James Bay. It is the largest country third-level subdivision by land area worldwide.

The Regional government covers a territory comprising all lands of Jamésie (TE) minus the four local municipalities (municipalité locale) — also known as the enclosed municipalities' — of Chibougamau, Lebel-sur-Quévillon, Chapais, and Matagami, and eight of the nine Cree communities (communautés crie) of Eeyou Istchee TE.

However, the territory includes four unconstituted localities (localités):

- Radisson
- Valcanton
- Val-Paradis
- Villebois

=== Composition and local governance ===
Local governance is carried out by way of the council of regional government, which for its first ten years is to be composed of 11 Cree representatives, 11 Jamésien representatives, and one non-voting representative of the government of Québec. The Cree representatives consist of the Grand Chief of the Cree Nation Government and then ten members appointed by the Board of the Cree Nation Government from within its own ranks. The Jamésien representatives consist of members of the local municipal councils of Chapais, Chibougamau, Lebel-sur-Quévillon, and Matagami as well as non-Crees in the Eeyout Istchee James Bay Territory and are appointed by the provincial Minister of Municipal Affairs, Regions and Land Occupancy. Finally, the non-voting representative of the government of Quebec is appointed by the Deputy Minister of the Ministère des Affaires municipales, des Régions et de l’Occupation du territoire (MAMROT) from amongst its staff.

==== Current composition ====
Chairperson: Mandy Gull-Masty

Cree representatives are:

- Norman A. Wapachee (Vice-Chairperson of Grand Council of the Crees)
- Christina Gilpin (Chief of the Cree Nation of Wemindji)
- Gaston Cooper (Chief of the Cree Nation of Oujé-Bougoumou)
- Clarke Shecapio (Chief of the Cree Nation of Waskaganish)
- Raymond Shanoush (Chief of the Cree Nation of Eastmain)
- Daisy House (Chief of the Cree Nation of Chisasibi)
- Robbie Kawapit (Chief of the Cree Nation of Whapmagoostui)
- Irene Neeposh (Chief of the Cree Nation of Waswanipi)
- Michael Petawabano (Chief of the Cree Nation of Mistissini)
- Clarence Jolly (Chief of the Cree Nation of Nemaska)

Jamésien representatives are:

- Manon Cyr (Mayor of Chibougamau)
- René Dubé (Mayor of Matagami)
- Guy Lafrenière (Mayor of Lebel-sur-Quévillon)
- Denis Lemoyne (Councilor of Lebel-sur-Quévillon)
- André Elliot (President of the locality of Valcanton)
- Alain Poirier (Councilor of Chibougamau)
- Jacques Fortin (Mayor of Chapais)
- Luc Michaud (Councilor of Chibougamau)
- Claudine Desgagnés (President of the locality of Valcanton)
- Sébastien Lebrun (President of the locality of Radisson)
- Jonathan Mattson (Councilor of Chibougamau)

Government of Québec representative: Philippe Boivin

=== Regional governance ===
The enclaved settlements are not under the jurisdiction of the Eeyou Istchee James Bay Regional Government unless an enclaved settlement, by a unanimous vote of its local council, requests partnership with the regional government. In that instance, the territorial regional government may carry out the powers of a regional county municipality (RCM).

=== Provincial & federal representation ===
Eeyou Istchee James Bay forms part of the federal electoral district of Abitibi—Baie-James—Nunavik—Eeyou and has been represented by Mandy Gull-Masty of the Liberal since 2025. Provincially, Eeyou Istchee James Bay is part of the Ungava electoral district and is represented by Denis Lamothe of the Coalition Avenir Québec since 2018.

Eeyou Istchee James Bay federal election results
| Year | Liberal | | Conservative | | Bloc Québécois | | New Democratic | | Green | |
|---|---|---|---|---|---|---|---|---|---|---|
| 2021 | 20% | 164 | 17% | 138 | 49% | 410 | 5% | 44 | 2% | 14 |
| 2019 | 19% | 188 | 18% | 178 | 51% | 490 | 6% | 60 | 2% | 24 |
| 2015 | 18% | 111 | 5% | 33 | 19% | 118 | 56% | 348 | 1% | 9 |
| 2011 | 5% | 27 | 7% | 36 | 32% | 161 | 54% | 275 | 2% | 10 |
| 2008 | 24% | 130 | 13% | 69 | 48% | 260 | 13% | 68 | 2% | 11 |
| 2006 | 18% | 122 | 16% | 105 | 54% | 359 | 7% | 47 | 5% | 30 |
| 2004 | 37% | 214 | 3% | 20 | 53% | 302 | 4% | 22 | 3% | 17 |

Eeyou Istchee James Bay provincial election results
| Year | CAQ | | Liberal | | QC solidaire | | Parti Québécois | |
|---|---|---|---|---|---|---|---|---|
| 2022 | 46% | 325 | 4% | 30 | 16% | 110 | 23% | 163 |
| 2018 | 40% | 372 | 8% | 76 | 16% | 146 | 24% | 222 |
| 2014 | 16% | 202 | 24% | 292 | 3% | 42 | 50% | 616 |
| 2012 | 14% | 104 | 25% | 180 | 4% | 27 | 55% | 397 |

== Infrastructure ==
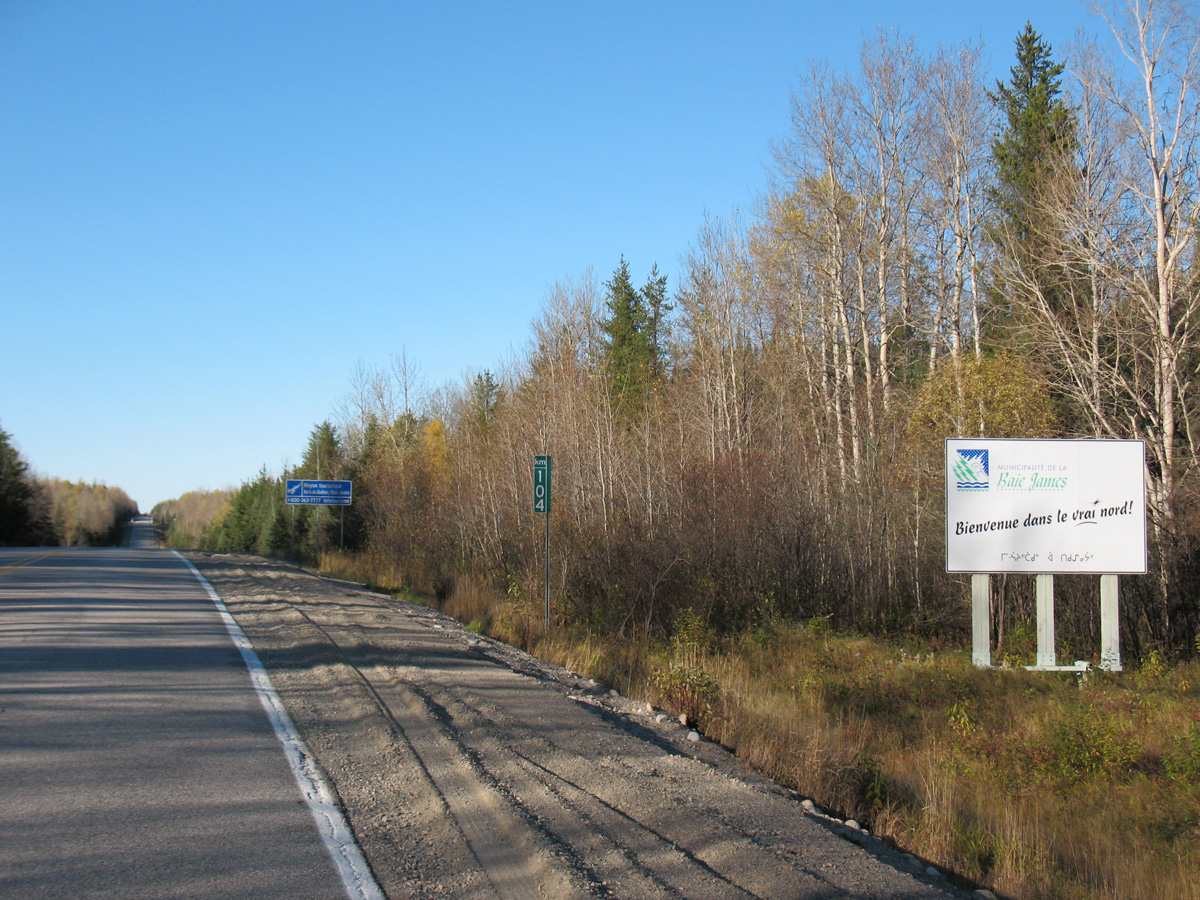
Welcome sign along Route 109

The primary roads to and within Baie-James are:

- Route 109 - provincial highway to Matagami
- Route 113 - provincial highway from Val-d'Or to Chibougamau
- Route 393 - regional highway to Val-Paradis
- James Bay Road - road from Matagami to Radisson
- North Road
- Trans-Taiga Road - access road to hydro-electric stations of the James Bay Project

Air transportation is through the La Grande Rivière Airport near Radisson, which provides scheduled air service to Montreal and Puvirnituq.

== See also ==
- List of anglophone communities in Quebec
