= Quebec Route 113 =

Highway in Quebec, Canada

Route 113

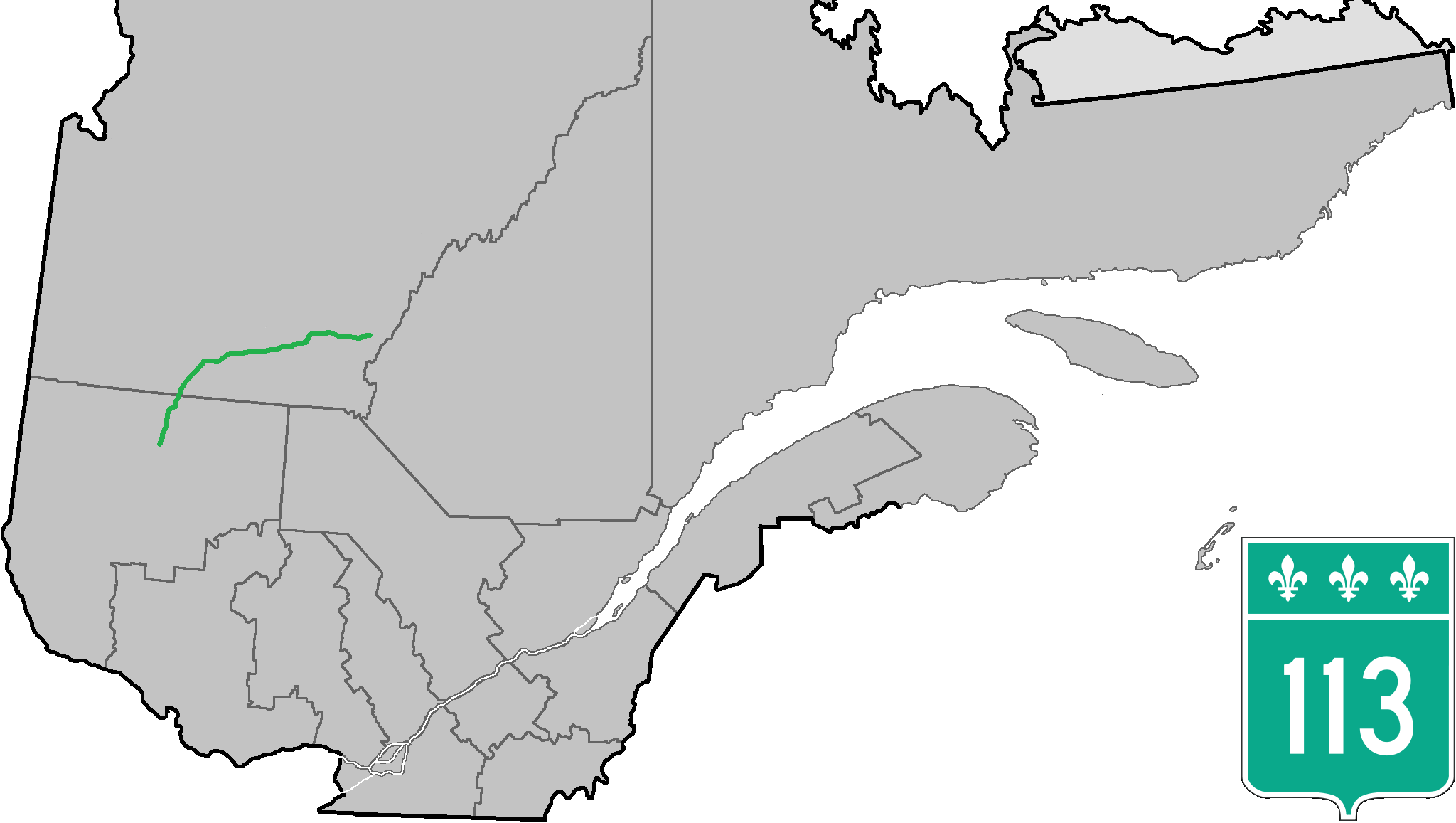

Route information
- Maintained by Transports Québec
- Length: 366.4 km (227.7 mi)
- History: Route 58

Major junctions
- South end: R-117 (TCH) in Val-d'Or
- R-386 / R-397 in Senneterre
- North end: R-167 in Chibougamau

Location
- Country: Canada
- Province: Quebec
- Major cities: Val-d'Or, Chibougamau, Senneterre

Highway system
- Quebec provincial highways; Autoroutes; List; Former
← R-112	→ R-116

Route 113 is a north/south two lane highway in northern Quebec, Canada. It starts at Route 117 just north of the Louvicourt district of Val-d'Or and continues north and north-east roughly until Waswanipi from where it continues east until it ends at Route 167 in Chibougamau. For most of its length, Route 113 goes through areas that are sparsely populated but where logging is an important economic activity.

== Municipalities along Route 113 ==
- Val-d'Or
- Senneterre (parish)
- Senneterre (city)
- Lac-Despinassy
- Lebel-sur-Quévillon
- Eeyou Istchee Baie-James
- Waswanipi
- Chapais
- Chibougamau

== Major intersections ==
RCM or ET	Municipality	Km	Road	Notes
Southern terminus of Route 113
La Vallée-de-l'Or	Val-d'Or	0.0	R-117 (TCH)	117 SOUTH: to Mont-Laurier; 117 NORTH: to Val-d'Or
La Vallée-de-l'Or	Senneterre	36.8	R-386 (East end)	386 WEST: to Amos
La Vallée-de-l'Or	Senneterre	104.8	R-397 (North end)	397 SOUTH: to Lac-Despinassy
Jamésie	Chibougamau	366.4	R-167	167 SOUTH: to Lac-Ashuapmushuan; 167 NORTH: to Chibougamau
Northern terminus of Route 113

== See also ==
- List of Quebec provincial highways
