= Chibougamau =

- City
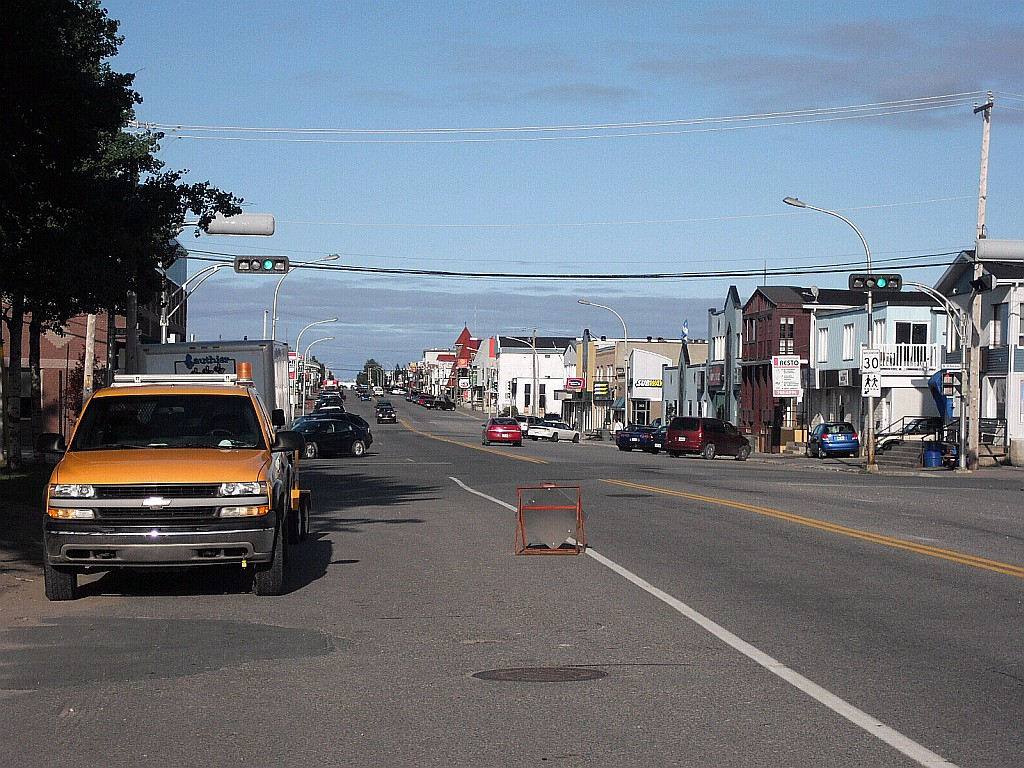
- Chibougamau main street

- Flag Coat of arms
- Motto: Terra nostra dat fructum suum
- Location in Quebec
- Coordinates (650, 3e Rue): 49°54′48″N 74°22′07″W
- Country: Canada
- Province: Quebec
- Region: Nord-du-Québec
- RCM: None
- Settled: 1952
- Constituted: November 8, 1952

Government
  - Mayor: Nichèle Compartino
  - Fed. riding: Abitibi—Baie-James—Nunavik—Eeyou
  - Prov. riding: Ungava

Area (2021)
  - Total: 1,039.9 km^{2} (401.5 sq mi)
  - Land: 694.87 km^{2} (268.29 sq mi)
  - Urban: 6.00 km^{2} (2.32 sq mi)

Population (2021)
  - Total: 7,233
  - Density: 10.4/km^{2} (27/sq mi)
  - Urban: 6,491
  - Urban density: 1,081.2/km^{2} (2,800/sq mi)
  - Pop (2016-21): ▼3.6%
  - Dwellings: 3,557
- Time zone: UTC−05:00 (EST)
  - Summer (DST): UTC−04:00 (EDT)
- Postal code(s): G8P
- Area codes: 418, 581
- Climate: Dfc
- Highways: R-113 R-167
- Website: www.ville.chibougamau.qc.ca

Chibougamau (French pronunciation: [ʃibuɡamo]) is the largest town in Nord-du-Québec, central Quebec, Canada. Located on Lake Gilman, it has a population of 7,233 people (2021 Canadian census). Chibougamau is surrounded by, but not part of, the local municipality of Eeyou Istchee James Bay. Chibougamau means "gathering place" in the Cree language.

Its remoteness from Lac Saint-Jean (over 200 km (120 mi) south-east) and Abitibi-Témiscamingue (over 250 km (160 mi) south-west) areas causes Chibougamau to provide services for a few smaller communities surrounding it (Mistissini, Oujé-Bougoumou, and Chapais) and for the regional resource-based industries. Despite Chibougamau's remoteness, it is only about as far north as Winnipeg and is south of any part of the mainland of England.

Access to the town is by Route 167 from Lac Saint-Jean and by Route 113 from Lebel-sur-Quévillon. Chibougamau/Chapais Airport is along Route 113, about halfway to Chapais.

== History ==
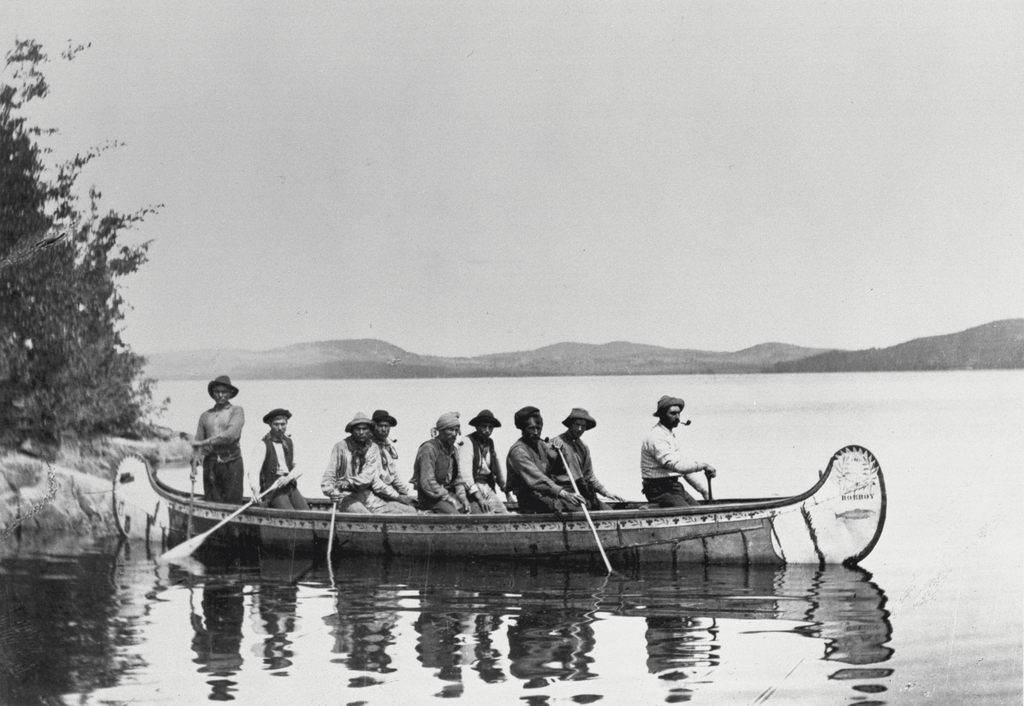
Expédition de Albert Peter Low (1861–1942), lac Chibougamau, 1892.

The area has long been part of the Cree territory. It was in the early 17th century that French explorers and traders, including Charles Albanel in 1671, came to the Chibougamau Lake area. However, no permanent European settlements were established at that time.

Only in the late 19th century would the area attract the interest of mining prospectors. When gold was discovered in 1903, there were periods of intense exploration. The difficulty of access caused no lasting development to take place at the time.

In 1918, the Hudson's Bay Company (HBC) established a storage depot on Chibougamau Lake to supply the Mistassinni trading post. Circa 1927, a fur trading post was added to the depot and it became an outpost of Mistassinni. Circa 1931, Chibougamau became a full post, but closed in 1941.

In 1949, copper extraction began, with the opening of a multi-metallic mine in the area, and a permanent community was established in 1952. Chibougamau started out as a company town but soon afterward, in 1954, it was incorporated as a municipality. That same year, the HBC reopened their post, which was converted to a store in 1956. Many mines have exploited the area since. While still thought of as a mining town, Chibougamau is now also the centre of a large logging and sawmill industry.

From 1962 to 1988, the Royal Canadian Air Force operated CFS Chibougamau, a radar station in Chibougamau that was part of the Pinetree Line. The complex has now been transformed into a golf complex and an office for a mining company. In 1984, the HBC store (operating as a Northern Store since 1964) permanently closed.

From December 2001 to 2012, the mayor of Chibougamau also sat on the municipal council of Municipality of Baie-James.

The city is home to an annual "Folies frettes" festival ("Cold Follies") and a snowmobile rally.

== Geography ==
Nearby is Lac Aux Dorés, which is fed by the Chibougamau River from the larger Chibougamau Lake after which the town was named. The neighbouring Cree village of Oujé-Bougoumou has the same name with a more traditional Cree spelling.

The area surrounding Lake Gilman is Obalski Regional Park. Its many amenities include a beach, pier, picnic tables, and cabins. The many trails allow for hiking, cycling, cross-country skiing, or even snowmobiling through the park's boreal forest.

=== Climate ===
Chibougamau has a humid continental climate (Köppen climate classification Dfb), bordering very closely on a subarctic climate. Winters are long, very cold, and very snowy with a January high of −12.7 °C (9.1 °F) and a low of −24.1 °C (−11.4 °F). Summers are warm though short with a July high of 22.9 °C (73.2 °F) and a low of 10.2 °C (50.4 °F). The average temperature for the year is 0.4 °C (32.7 °F) (1991–2020), an increase of 0.2 °C (0.36 °F) from 1981–2010. Overall precipitation is high for such a cold climate with an average annual precipitation of 995.8 mm (39.20 in) and 312.9 cm (123.2 in) of snow per season. Precipitation is significant year-round, though February through April are drier.

Climate data for Chapais (Note: Located 38 km (24 mi) southwest) WMO ID: 71824; climate ID: 7091299; coordinates 49°49′21″N 74°58′31″W; elevation: 381.1 m (1,250 ft) and Chapais 2; climate ID: 7091305; coordinates 49°47′N 74°51′W; elevation: 396.2 m (1,300 ft); 1991–2020 normals (precipitation normals from 1981–2010)
Month	Jan	Feb	Mar	Apr	May	Jun	Jul	Aug	Sep	Oct	Nov	Dec	Year
Record high humidex	6.0	5.9	22.5	24.1	37.4	39.2	37.7	40.3	38.5	28.7	18.8	8.6	40.3
Record high °C (°F)	8.5 (47.3)	9.0 (48.2)	22.5 (72.5)	28.0 (82.4)	34.1 (93.4)	35.0 (95.0)	35.0 (95.0)	33.3 (91.9)	29.9 (85.8)	24.8 (76.6)	17.8 (64.0)	11.0 (51.8)	35.0 (95.0)
Mean daily maximum °C (°F)	−12.7 (9.1)	−10.2 (13.6)	−3.0 (26.6)	5.1 (41.2)	14.7 (58.5)	21.2 (70.2)	22.9 (73.2)	21.0 (69.8)	15.9 (60.6)	7.3 (45.1)	−1.1 (30.0)	−8.4 (16.9)	6.1 (43.0)
Daily mean °C (°F)	−18.5 (−1.3)	−16.6 (2.1)	−9.9 (14.2)	−1.0 (30.2)	8.1 (46.6)	14.4 (57.9)	16.6 (61.9)	15.1 (59.2)	10.4 (50.7)	3.4 (38.1)	−4.5 (23.9)	−13.0 (8.6)	0.4 (32.7)
Mean daily minimum °C (°F)	−24.1 (−11.4)	−23.0 (−9.4)	−16.7 (1.9)	−7.0 (19.4)	1.4 (34.5)	7.5 (45.5)	10.2 (50.4)	9.2 (48.6)	4.8 (40.6)	−0.5 (31.1)	−8.0 (17.6)	−17.6 (0.3)	−5.3 (22.5)
Record low °C (°F)	−43.3 (−45.9)	−42.8 (−45.0)	−40.9 (−41.6)	−28.9 (−20.0)	−16.9 (1.6)	−5.6 (21.9)	−0.7 (30.7)	−2.2 (28.0)	−7.3 (18.9)	−17.2 (1.0)	−30.0 (−22.0)	−42.0 (−43.6)	−43.3 (−45.9)
Record low wind chill	−50.0	−50.0	−48.7	−33.5	−16.3	−6.6	−1.3	−2.8	−8.8	−19.8	−30.7	−48.6	−50.0
Average precipitation mm (inches)	61.9 (2.44)	39.4 (1.55)	50.3 (1.98)	56.6 (2.23)	82.4 (3.24)	100.1 (3.94)	124.3 (4.89)	100.2 (3.94)	129.7 (5.11)	93.9 (3.70)	93.2 (3.67)	63.5 (2.50)	995.8 (39.20)
Average rainfall mm (inches)	3.2 (0.13)	2.4 (0.09)	8.8 (0.35)	28.7 (1.13)	75.5 (2.97)	100.1 (3.94)	124.3 (4.89)	100.2 (3.94)	128.6 (5.06)	70.9 (2.79)	36.7 (1.44)	5.0 (0.20)	684.5 (26.95)
Average snowfall cm (inches)	58.8 (23.1)	37.0 (14.6)	41.6 (16.4)	29.5 (11.6)	6.9 (2.7)	0.0 (0.0)	0.0 (0.0)	0.0 (0.0)	1.2 (0.5)	23.0 (9.1)	56.5 (22.2)	58.5 (23.0)	312.9 (123.2)
Average precipitation days (≥ 0.2 mm)	18.1	13.6	12.1	12.3	14.8	16.3	17.4	17.1	20.2	19.8	19.9	19.3	200.9
Average rainy days (≥ 0.2 mm)	0.55	1.1	2.4	6.7	13.6	16.3	17.4	17.1	20.1	14.5	6.1	1.3	117.15
Average snowy days (≥ 0.2 cm)	18.0	12.9	10.4	7.9	2.5	0.0	0.0	0.0	0.47	7.4	16.1	18.5	94.17
Average relative humidity (%) (at 1500 LST)	77.2	67.7	52.8	52.1	45.4	49.8	56.3	60.9	64.6	74.4	83.5	83.8	64.0
Source: Environment and Climate Change Canada, precipitation and precipitation days,

== Demographics ==
In the 2021 Canadian census conducted by Statistics Canada, Chibougamau had a population of 7,233 living in 3190 of its 3,557 total private dwellings, a change of −3.6% from its 2016 population of 7,504. With a land area of 694.87 km^{2} (268.29 sq mi), it had a population density of 10.4/km^{2} (27.0/sq mi) in 2021.

The median age is 40.8, as opposed to 41.6 for all of Canada. French was the mother tongue of 92.5% of residents in 2021. The next most common mother tongues were English at 3.0%, followed by Cree-Innu languages at 1.6%. A small number (0.9%) reported both English and French as their first language. Additionally there were 0.2% who reported both French and a non-official language as their mother tongue.

As of 2021, Indigenous peoples, primarily First Nations and some Métis, comprised 7.8% of the population and visible minorities contributed 3.9%. The largest visible minority groups in Chibougamau are Black (1.5%), Filipino (1.1%), and Arab (0.8%). The region is home to 555 recent immigrants (i.e. those arriving between 2016 and 2021).

In 2021, 67.7% of the population identified as Catholic, while 22.8% said they had no religious affiliation. Pentecostals were the largest religious minority, at 1.3% of the population, while Muslims were the largest non-Christian religious minority, making up 0.8% of the population.

Historical census populations – Chibougamau

Year	Pop.	±%
1956	1,262	—
1961	4,765	+277.6%
1966	8,902	+86.8%
1971	9,701	+9.0%
1976	10,536	+8.6%
1981	10,732	+1.9%
1986	9,922	−7.5%

Year	Pop.	±%
1991	8,855	−10.8%
1996	8,664	−2.2%
2001	7,922	−8.6%
2006	7,563	−4.5%
2011	7,541	−0.3%
2016	7,504	−0.5%
2021	7,233	−3.6%

Source: Statistics Canada

=== Ethnicity ===
Counting both single and multiple responses, the most commonly identified ethnocultural ancestries were (percentages may total more than 100% due to rounding and multiple responses):

- Canadian: 33.8%
- French: 22.1%
- Québécois: 16.6%
- French Canadian: 10.7%
- First Nations: 4.4%
- Cree: 4.2%
- Irish: 3.9%
- Italian: 1.3%
- Métis: 1.2%
- Filipino: 1.1%

Visible minority and Indigenous population (2021 Canadian census)
Population group		Population	% of total population
White		6,310	88.3%
Visible minority group	South Asian	0	0%
Visible minority group	Chinese	25	0.3%
Visible minority group	Black	110	1.5%
Visible minority group	Filipino	80	1.1%
Visible minority group	Arab	55	0.8%
Visible minority group	Latin American	0	0%
Visible minority group	Southeast Asian	0	0%
Visible minority group	West Asian	0	0%
Visible minority group	Korean	0	0%
Visible minority group	Japanese	0	0%
Visible minority group	Visible minority, n.i.e.	0	0%
Visible minority group	Multiple visible minority	0	0%
Total visible minority population		280	3.9%
Indigenous group	First Nations	350	4.9%
Indigenous group	Métis	170	2.4%
Indigenous group	Inuit	0	0%
Indigenous group	Indigenous, n.i.e.	10	0.1%
Indigenous group	Multiple Indigenous identity	30	0.4%
Total Indigenous population		560	7.8%
Total population		7,150	100%

== Government ==
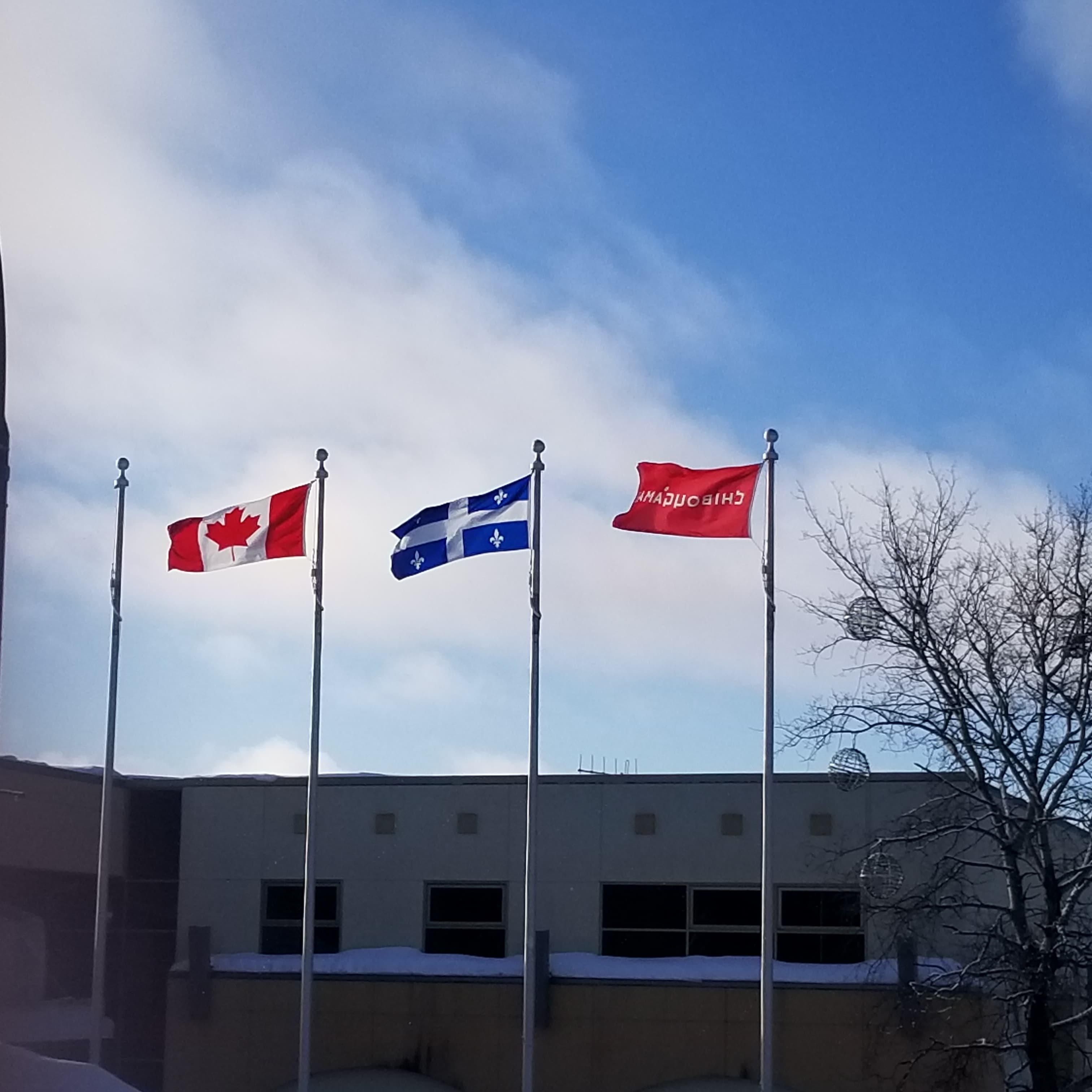
Flag of Chibougamau in front of city hall

List of former mayors:

- Jacques Perreault (manager): 1953–1954
- Jean-Baptiste Laflamme (appointed mayor): 1954–1958
- Godefroy De Billy (first elected mayor): 1958–1975, 1979–1981
- Jean-Paul Lanctôt: 1975–1979, 1981–1987
- Ronald Blackburn: 1987–1999
- Donald Bubar: 1999–2009
- Manon Cyr: 2009–2025
- Nichèle Compartino (2025–present)

== Education ==
French-language schools in Chibougamau, past and present, are:

- École Bon-Pasteur
- École Vatican II
- École Notre-Dame-du-Rosaire
- École La Porte-du-Nord
- École Vinette (closed 1994)
- Centre de formation professionnelle de la Baie-James
- Centre d'études collégiales Chibougamau

The English-language school is MacLean Memorial School. formerly Chibougamau Protestant School. There also used to be a Catholic English-language school called Holy Family School.

== See also ==
- Jamésie
- List of communities in Quebec
