= Chapais, Quebec =

City in Canada

Chapais
- City
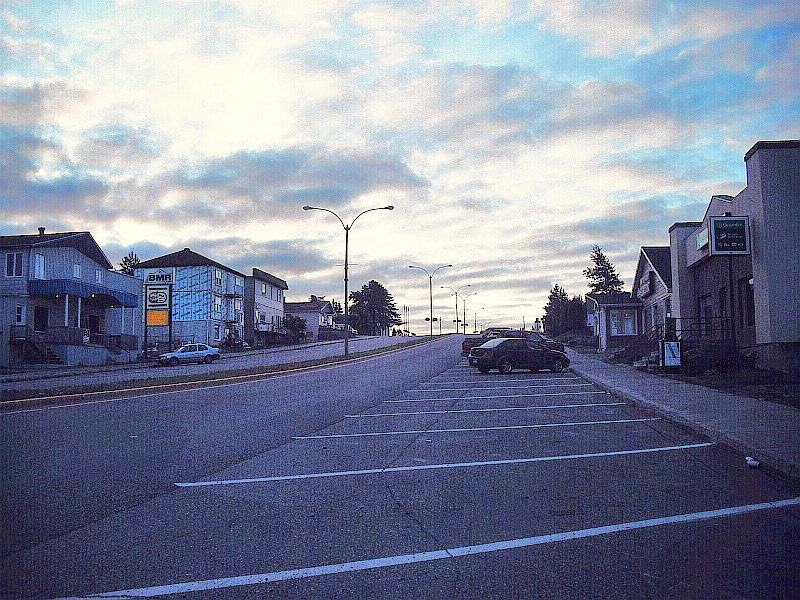

- Location within Quebec
- Coordinates: 49°47′N 74°51′W
- Country: Canada
- Province: Quebec
- Region: Nord-du-Québec
- RCM: None
- Settled: 1929
- Constituted: November 16, 1955
- Named for: Thomas Chapais

Government
  - Mayor: Jacques Fortin
  - Federal riding: Abitibi—Baie-James—Nunavik—Eeyou
  - Prov. riding: Ungava

Area
  - City: 62.40 km^{2} (24.09 sq mi)
  - Land: 62.31 km^{2} (24.06 sq mi)
  - Urban: 1.03 km^{2} (0.40 sq mi)

Population (2021)
  - City: 1,468
  - Density: 23.6/km^{2} (61/sq mi)
  - Urban: 1,289
  - Urban density: 1,247.7/km^{2} (3,232/sq mi)
  - Change (2016–21): ▼2.1%
  - Dwellings: 711
- Time zone: UTC−05:00 (EST)
  - Summer (DST): UTC−04:00 (EDT)
- Postal code(s): G0W 1H0
- Area codes: 418 and 581
- Highways: R-113
- Website: www.villedechapais.com

Chapais (French pronunciation: [ʃapɛ]) is a community in the Canadian province of Quebec, located on Route 113 near Chibougamau in the Jamésie region. It is surrounded by, but not a part of, the local municipality of Eeyou Istchee James Bay. The community was first settled in 1929, when prospector Léo Springer discovered deposits of copper, silver and gold in the area. Named for Thomas Chapais, it was incorporated as a city in 1955. The town is listed as a Village rélais.

== History ==
Opémisca Copper Mines operated the community's mine until 1991. More recently, with the closure of the mines, the community's primary industry has been forestry. The community opened the first cogeneration plant in Quebec to produce electricity from the sawmill's waste matter.

On the night of January 1, 1980, at 1:30 a.m., 48 people were killed when a fire destroyed the Opémiska Community Hall. Fifty others were injured and rushed to Chibougamau hospital. This fire was the worst to occur in Quebec for more than 40 years. The fire started in wreaths of dried branches and other Christmas decorations, and the ensuing chaos that followed quickly blocked access to the main entrance. Several people managed to escape in time, but the tragedy left deep scars in the community.

Chapais had a population of 1,468 in the Canada 2021 Census.

A crater on Mars is named after this community.

The community, and the efforts of its residents to keep it alive in the face of economic decline, are profiled in the 2013 documentary film Waiting for Spring (En attendant le printemps).

== Geography ==
=== Climate ===
Chapais has a marginal subarctic climate (Köppen: Dfc), slightly colder than the humid continental (Köppen: Dfb) areas to the south. While winters are bitterly cold, summers are relatively warm during daytime, though nights remain relatively cool. As such, the yearly mean is just above freezing. Summers have high rainfall and winters are quite snowy.

Climate data for Chapais (1991–2020 normals, extremes 1962–present)
Month	Jan	Feb	Mar	Apr	May	Jun	Jul	Aug	Sep	Oct	Nov	Dec	Year
Record high humidex	6.0	5.9	22.5	24.1	37.4	39.2	37.7	40.3	38.5	28.7	18.8	8.6	40.3
Record high °C (°F)	8.5 (47.3)	9.0 (48.2)	22.5 (72.5)	28.0 (82.4)	34.1 (93.4)	35.0 (95.0)	35.0 (95.0)	33.3 (91.9)	29.9 (85.8)	24.8 (76.6)	17.8 (64.0)	11.0 (51.8)	35.0 (95.0)
Mean daily maximum °C (°F)	−12.7 (9.1)	−10.2 (13.6)	−3.0 (26.6)	5.1 (41.2)	14.7 (58.5)	21.2 (70.2)	22.9 (73.2)	21.0 (69.8)	15.9 (60.6)	7.3 (45.1)	−1.1 (30.0)	−8.4 (16.9)	6.1 (43.0)
Daily mean °C (°F)	−18.5 (−1.3)	−16.6 (2.1)	−9.9 (14.2)	−1.0 (30.2)	8.1 (46.6)	14.4 (57.9)	16.6 (61.9)	15.1 (59.2)	10.4 (50.7)	3.4 (38.1)	−4.5 (23.9)	−13.0 (8.6)	0.4 (32.7)
Mean daily minimum °C (°F)	−24.1 (−11.4)	−23.0 (−9.4)	−16.7 (1.9)	−7.0 (19.4)	1.4 (34.5)	7.5 (45.5)	10.2 (50.4)	9.2 (48.6)	4.8 (40.6)	−0.5 (31.1)	−8.0 (17.6)	−17.6 (0.3)	−5.3 (22.5)
Record low °C (°F)	−43.3 (−45.9)	−42.8 (−45.0)	−40.9 (−41.6)	−28.9 (−20.0)	−16.9 (1.6)	−5.6 (21.9)	−0.7 (30.7)	−2.2 (28.0)	−7.3 (18.9)	−17.2 (1.0)	−30.0 (−22.0)	−42.0 (−43.6)	−43.3 (−45.9)
Record low wind chill	−50.0	−50.0	−48.7	−33.5	−16.3	−6.6	−1.3	−2.8	−8.8	−19.8	−30.7	−48.6	−50.0
Average precipitation mm (inches)	61.9 (2.44)	39.4 (1.55)	50.3 (1.98)	56.6 (2.23)	82.4 (3.24)	100.1 (3.94)	124.3 (4.89)	100.2 (3.94)	129.7 (5.11)	93.9 (3.70)	93.2 (3.67)	63.5 (2.50)	995.5 (39.19)
Average rainfall mm (inches)	3.2 (0.13)	2.4 (0.09)	8.8 (0.35)	28.7 (1.13)	75.5 (2.97)	100.1 (3.94)	124.3 (4.89)	100.2 (3.94)	128.6 (5.06)	70.9 (2.79)	36.7 (1.44)	5.0 (0.20)	684.4 (26.93)
Average snowfall cm (inches)	58.8 (23.1)	37.0 (14.6)	41.6 (16.4)	29.5 (11.6)	6.9 (2.7)	0.0 (0.0)	0.0 (0.0)	0.0 (0.0)	1.2 (0.5)	23.0 (9.1)	56.5 (22.2)	58.5 (23.0)	313.0 (123.2)
Average precipitation days (≥ 0.2 mm)	18.1	13.6	12.1	12.3	14.8	16.3	17.4	17.1	20.2	19.8	19.9	19.3	200.9
Average rainy days (≥ 0.2 mm)	0.55	1.1	2.4	6.7	13.6	16.3	17.4	17.1	20.1	14.5	6.1	1.3	117.15
Average snowy days (≥ 0.2 cm)	18.0	12.9	10.4	7.9	2.5	0.0	0.0	0.0	0.47	7.4	16.1	18.5	94.17
Mean monthly sunshine hours	90	122	170	164	202	234	233	208	113	84	46	66	1,732
Source 1: Environment Canada (precipitation/rainfall/snow 1981–2010)
Source 2: The Weather Network (sunshine data only)

== Demographics ==
In the 2021 Census of Population conducted by Statistics Canada, Chapais had a population of 1,468 living in 648 of its 711 total private dwellings, a change of −2.1% from its 2016 population of 1,499. With a land area of 62.31 km^{2} (24.06 sq mi), it had a population density of 23.6/km^{2} (61.0/sq mi) in 2021.

Population:

- Population in 2021: 1,468
  - 2016 to 2021 population change: −2.1%
- Population in 2016: 1,499
- Population in 2011: 1,610
- Population in 2006: 1,630
- Population in 2001: 1,795
- Population in 1996: 2,030
- Population in 1991: 2,391
- Population in 1986: 2,875
- Population in 1981: 3,119
- Population in 1976: 3,147
- Population in 1971: 2,914
- Population in 1966: 2,459
- Population in 1961: 2,363
- Population in 1956: 380

Mother tongue:

- English as first language: 3.7%
- French as first language: 89.5%
- English and French as first language: 1%
- Other as first language: 5.1%
