= Tonnerre River (Normandin River tributary) =

Tonnerre
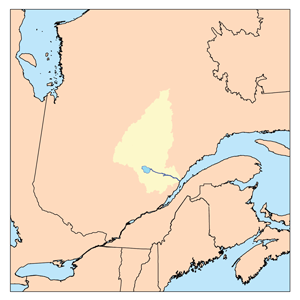
- Watershed of Saguenay River

Location
- Country: Canada
- Province: Quebec
- Region: Saguenay-Lac-Saint-Jean

Physical characteristics
- Source: Île Ronde Lake
  - location: Lac-Ashuapmushuan, Quebec, MRC Le Domaine-du-Roy, Saguenay-Lac-Saint-Jean, Quebec
  - coordinates: 49°26′13″N 74°03′34″W
  - elevation: 406 m (1,332 ft)
- Mouth: Normandin River
  - location: Lac-Ashuapmushuan, Quebec, MRC Le Domaine-du-Roy, Saguenay-Lac-Saint-Jean, Quebec
  - coordinates: 49°21′08″N 74°04′35″W
  - elevation: 383 m (1,257 ft)
- Length: 12.6 km (7.8 mi)

Basin features
- Tributaries
  - left: (upstream); outlet of lakes Hassels, Guitare and Jacques-Drouin; outlet of lake des Simulies; outlet of lakes Wilfrid, Omer, Bayel and lakes Siamois; outlet of lake Couvret.
  - right: (upstream); outlet of lakes Cardo and Édon (via le lac Harquail); outlet of lakes à l’Ourson, du Bannock, Astier and Carci; outlet of lake du Crouton.

The rivière au Tonnerre (English: Tonnerre River) is a tributary of the Normandin River, flowing into the unorganized territory of Lac-Ashuapmushuan, Quebec in the Regional County Municipality (RCM) of Le Domaine-du-Roy, in the administrative region of Saguenay-Lac-Saint-Jean, in Quebec, in Canada.

The Tonnerre River flows entirely in the Township of Ducharme. Forestry is the main economic activity of this valley; recreational tourism activities, second.

The route 167 (northwesterly) connecting Chibougamau to Saint-Félicien, Quebec cuts the middle of the Tonnerre River. The Canadian National Railway runs along this road.

The surface of the Tonnerre River is usually frozen from early November to mid-May, however, safe ice circulation is generally from mid-November to mid-April.

== Geography ==
The hydrographic slopes adjacent to the Tonnerre River are:
- North side: Coquille River, Coquille Lake, Boisvert River (Normandin River), Armitage River;
- East side: Chaudière River (Normandin River), Atouk Creek, Little Chef's River;
- South side: Bouteville Creek, Normandin River, Poutrincourt Lake, Marquette River West;
- West side: Nicabau Lake, Rohault Lake, Bouteroue Lake, Boisvert River (Normandin River).

The Tonnerre River originates at the mouth of "Île Ronde Lake" (length: 2.8 kilometres (1.7 mi) width: 0.5 kilometres (0.31 mi) altitude: 406 metres (1,332 ft)) in the township of Ducharme. The mouth of this head lake is located at:

- 5.2 kilometres (3.2 mi) north-east of Nicabau Lake;
- 9.1 kilometres (5.7 mi) north of the mouth of the "Tonnerre River" (confluence with the Normandin River);
- 23.4 kilometres (14.5 mi) south-east of Obatogamau Lakes;
- 32.1 kilometres (19.9 mi) northwest of the mouth of the Normandin River (confluence with Ashuapmushuan Lake);
- 152.8 kilometres (94.9 mi) northwest of the mouth of the Ashuapmushuan River (confluence with Lac Saint-Jean).

From the mouth of Round Island Lake, the "Tonnerre River" flows over 12.6 kilometres (7.8 mi), according to the following segments:

- 2.3 kilometres (1.4 mi) towards the Southwest, to the dump (coming from the North-West) of the Crouton lakes, the Pooh, the Bannock, Astier and Carei;
- 2.7 kilometres (1.7 mi) southeasterly to the outlet (from the southeast) of Wilfrid Lake;
- 2.8 kilometres (1.7 mi) southwesterly to route 167;
- 2.1 kilometres (1.3 mi) south by cutting the Canadian National Railway, then crossing Harquail Lake (length: 2.3 kilometres (1.4 mi); altitude: 392 metres (1,286 ft)), to its mouth;
- 2.7 kilometres (1.7 mi) southerly crossing Verreault Lake (elevation: 389 kilometres (242 mi)) along its entire length to its mouth. Note: This lake is also fed by the outlet (coming from the North-East) of Jacques-Drouin, Guitare and Hassels lakes.

The confluence of the "Tonnerre River" with the Normandin River is located at:

- 1.0 kilometre (0.62 mi) downstream north-east of the mouth of Nicabau Lake which is crossed by the Normandin River;
- 26.0 kilometres (16.2 mi) south-west of the mouth of the Normandin River (confluence with Ashuapmushuan Lake);
- 147.8 kilometres (91.8 mi) west of the mouth of the Ashuapmushuan River (confluence with the lac Saint-Jean);
- 186.7 kilometres (116.0 mi) northwest of the mouth of lac Saint-Jean (confluence with the Saguenay River).
The Tonnerre River flows into a small bay on the north shore of the Normandin River, downstream of the dam at the mouth of Nicabau Lake. From there, the current flows south-east along the Normandin River on 38.7 kilometres (24.0 mi) to the northwestern shore of Ashuapmushuan Lake. Then, the current takes the course of the Ashuapmushuan River which flows to Saint-Félicien, Quebec on the west shore of Lac Saint-Jean.

== Toponymy ==
The term "Normandin" is a family name of French origin.

The toponym "Rivière au Tonnerre" was formalized on June 8, 1971, at the Commission de toponymie du Québec.

== See also ==
- Saguenay River
- Lac Saint-Jean, a body of water
- Ashuapmushuan River, a watercourse
- Ashuapmushuan Lake, a body of water
- Normandin River, a watercourse
- Lac-Ashuapmushuan, Quebec, an unorganized territory
- Le Domaine-du-Roy, a regional county municipality (MRC)
- List of rivers of Quebec
