= Buade Lake (Normandin River) =

Lake in Lac-Ashuapmushuan, Quebec, Canada

- Location within Quebec
- Location: Saguenay-Lac Saint-Jean
- Coordinates: 49°05′11″N 74°11′24″W
- Type: Natural
- Primary inflows: (clockwise); Normandin River; outlet of Jarnac Lake; outlet of Salomon Lake; outlet of Leeds Lake; outlet of lake "de la Malice »; outlet of Haget Lake; outlet of Namur Lake; outlet of Margin Lake.
- Primary outflows: Normandin River
- Basin countries: Canada
- Max. length: 22.9 kilometres (14.2 mi)
- Max. width: 2.0 kilometres (1.2 mi)
- Surface area: 13.57 kilometres (8.43 mi)
- Surface elevation: 392 metres (1,286 ft)

Buade Lake is a freshwater body of the unorganized territory of Lac-Ashuapmushuan, Quebec, in the western part of the Regional County Municipality (MRC) Le Domaine-du-Roy, in the administrative region of Saguenay-Lac-Saint-Jean, in the province of Quebec, in Canada . This lake straddles the townships of Buade and Poutrincourt. It is located west of the Ashuapmushuan Wildlife Reserve.

Forestry is the main economic activity of the sector. Recreational tourism activities come second.

The western portion of the Buade Lake hydrographic slope is accessible via the R1032 forest road (North-South direction) which passes through the Ventadour River valley, on the west side. The forest road route 167 passes northeast of Nicabau Lake, connecting Chibougamau to Saint-Félicien, Quebec; a secondary road is detached to serve the east side of Poutrincourt Lake. The Canadian National Railway runs along route 167.

The surface of Buade Lake is usually frozen from early November to mid-May, however, safe ice movement is generally from mid-November to mid-April.

== Geography ==
Buade Lake is located at the western end of the MRC Le Domaine-du-Roy. This lake has a length of 22.9 kilometres (14.2 mi), a maximum width of 2.0 kilometres (1.2 mi) and an altitude of 392 metres (1,286 ft). The northern part of the lake has an archipelago of islands. This lake constitutes a large widening of the Normandin River which crosses it on its full length.

The mouth of Lake Buade is located at:

- 4.6 kilometres (2.9 mi) south of the confluence of the Normandin River with Poutrincourt Lake;
- 9.5 kilometres (5.9 mi) south of the mouth of Poutrincourt Lake;
- 24.2 kilometres (15.0 mi) south of the mouth of Nicabau Lake, which is crossed by the Normandin River;
- 28.7 kilometres (17.8 mi) south-west of the mouth of the Normandin River;
- 144 kilometres (89 mi) west of the mouth of the Ashuapmushuan River (confluence with lac Saint-Jean.

The main hydrographic slopes adjacent to Buade Lake are:

- North side: Poutrincourt Lake, Normandin River, Bouteroue Creek, Bouteroue Lake, Rohault Lake, Nicabau Lake, Obatogamau Lakes;
- East side: Poutrincourt Lake, Du Milieu River (Poutrincourt Lake), Marquette River West, Marquette River, Ashuapmushuan Lake;
- South side: Normandin River, Little Buade Lake, Townsend Creek, Du Milieu River (Poutrincourt Lake), Marquette River;
- West side: Titipiti River, Ventadour Lake (Ventadour River), Ventadour River, Queue de Castor River, Cawcot River.

From the road bridge at the mouth of lake Buade Lake, the current flows over:

- 5.4 kilometres (3.4 mi) to the North by making a hook of 1.2 kilometres (0.75 mi) to the east, to its confluence with the Poutrincourt Lake;
- 5.8 kilometres (3.6 mi) to the North crossing the Poutrincourt Lake;
- 15.6 kilometres (9.7 mi) north, forming a hook to the east, to a bay south of Nicabau Lake, the southern part of which is crossed by the Normandin River. From there, the Normandin River flows southeast to Ashuapmushuan Lake which is the head lake of the Ashuapmushuan River.

== Toponymy ==
In the old days, Buade Lake was designated "Kapikitegoitch Lake".

The toponym "Lake Buade" was made official on December 5, 1968, by the Commission de toponymie du Québec.

== See also ==
- Lac Saint-Jean, a body of water
- Ashuapmushuan River, a watercourse
- Normandin River, a watercourse
- Nicabau Lake, a body of water
- Poutrincourt Lake, a body of water
- Le Domaine-du-Roy, a regional county municipality (MRC)
- Lac-Ashuapmushuan, Quebec, an unorganized territory
- List of lakes in Canada
