= Normandin Lake =

- Location within Quebec
- Location: Le Domaine-du-Roy (RCM)
- Coordinates: 48°57′39″N 74°16′49″W
- Type: Lake of dam
- Primary inflows: (clockwise); Townsend creek (from South); outlet of lakes Parachute, Jumeau and Hatley; outlet of lakes Fertans and Cenon; outlet (from North) of a set of lakes such Anctil, Vinet, Dorval and Képi.
- Primary outflows: Normandin River
- Basin countries: Canada
- Max. length: 6.7 kilometres (4.2 mi)
- Max. width: 0.9 kilometres (0.56 mi)
- Surface elevation: 403 metres (1,322 ft)

Normandin Lake is a freshwater body of the unorganized territory of Lac-Ashuapmushuan, Quebec, in the western part of the Regional County Municipality (MRC) Le Domaine-du-Roy, in the administrative region of Saguenay-Lac-Saint-Jean, in the province of Quebec, in Canada.

This lake is entirely located in the canton of Ventadour which is at the end West of the MRC Le Domaine-du-Roy.

Forestry is the main economic activity of the sector. Recreational tourism activities come second.

The forest road route 212 linking Obedjiwan, Quebec and La Tuque pass south of Dubois Lake and Normandin Lake. Other secondary forest roads serve the vicinity of the lake.

The surface of Normandin Lake is usually frozen from early November to mid-May, however safe ice circulation is generally from mid-November to mid-April.

== Geography ==
This lake has a length of 6.7 kilometres (4.2 mi), a maximum width of 0.9 kilometres (0.56 mi) and an altitude of 403 metres (1,322 ft). Lake Normandin has two main parts separated by a short strait: the southern one measuring 2.6 kilometres (1.6 mi) and the northern one with a length of 4.1 kilometres (2.5 mi).

The mouth of Lake Normandin is located at:

- 5.9 kilometres (3.7 mi) south-west of the mouth of the Little Buade Lake;
- 23.1 kilometres (14.4 mi) south of the confluence of Buade Lake (Normandin River);
- 34.7 kilometres (21.6 mi) south of the mouth of Poutrincourt Lake;

South of the mouth of Nicabau Lake;

- 52.8 kilometres (32.8 mi) south-west of the mouth of the Normandin River (confluence with Ashuapmushuan Lake;
- 0.9 kilometres (0.56 mi) east of the Eeyou Istchee James Bay (municipality) boundary;
- 155.4 kilometres (96.6 mi) south-west of the mouth of the Ashuapmushuan River (confluence with lac Saint-Jean.

The main hydrographic slopes near Normandin Lake are:

- Northside: Anctil Lake, Normandin River, Marquette River, Poutrincourt Lake, Titipiti River;
- Eastside: Normandin River, Frontenac Lake, Marquette Lake, Du Milieu River (Normandin River), Marquette West River, Marquette River;
- Southside: Townsend Creek, Wapous River, Oskatcickic Creek;
- Westside: Dubois Lake, Eau Claire River (Gouin Reservoir), Toussaint River.
From the mouth of Lake Normandin, the current flows over 33.4 kilometres (20.8 mi) northeasterly to the mouth of Buade Lake (Normandin River), 26.3 kilometres (16.3 mi) north to the mouth of Nicabau Lake and 38.7 kilometres (24.0 mi) to the southeast, to Ashuapmushuan Lake which constitutes the lake head of the Ashuapmushuan River. This last river flows on the west shore of Lac-Saint-Jean.

== Toponymy ==
In 1900, this toponym is indicated on the Map of a road leading to the Lake Saint John to James Bay by the rivers Chamouchouan, Nottaway, Rupert explored in 1897-98-99 by Henry O'Sullivan, Land Survey Inspector province of Quebec. The name of the lake evokes the work of the life of the surveyor Joseph-Laurent Normandin. The latter had traveled the region of Saguenay-Lac-Saint-Jean in 1732 to draw a detailed map of the place by locating the lakes, large and small, and to fix the boundaries of the Domaine du Roi.

Normandin also wrote a journal entitled Journal de voyage that Joseph-Laurent Normandin had made in the King's domain in Canada from the Chicoutimi post office to the height of the land in 1732. During his exploration in 1732, Joseph- Laurent Normandin had designated Lake Normandin under the name "Lac Patchitachekaosakajgane", meaning lake of the height of land.

The toponym "Lake Normandin" was formalized on December 5, 1968, by the Commission de toponymie du Québec, i.e. at the creation of this commission.

== See also ==
- Saguenay River
- Lac Saint-Jean, a body of water
- Ashuapmushuan River, a watercourse
- Ashuapmushuan Lake, a body of water
- Normandin River, a watercourse
- Le Domaine-du-Roy, a Regional County Municipality (MRC)
- Lac-Ashuapmushuan, Quebec, an unorganized territory
- List of lakes in Canada
