= Bouteroue Lake =

Lake in Quebec, Canada

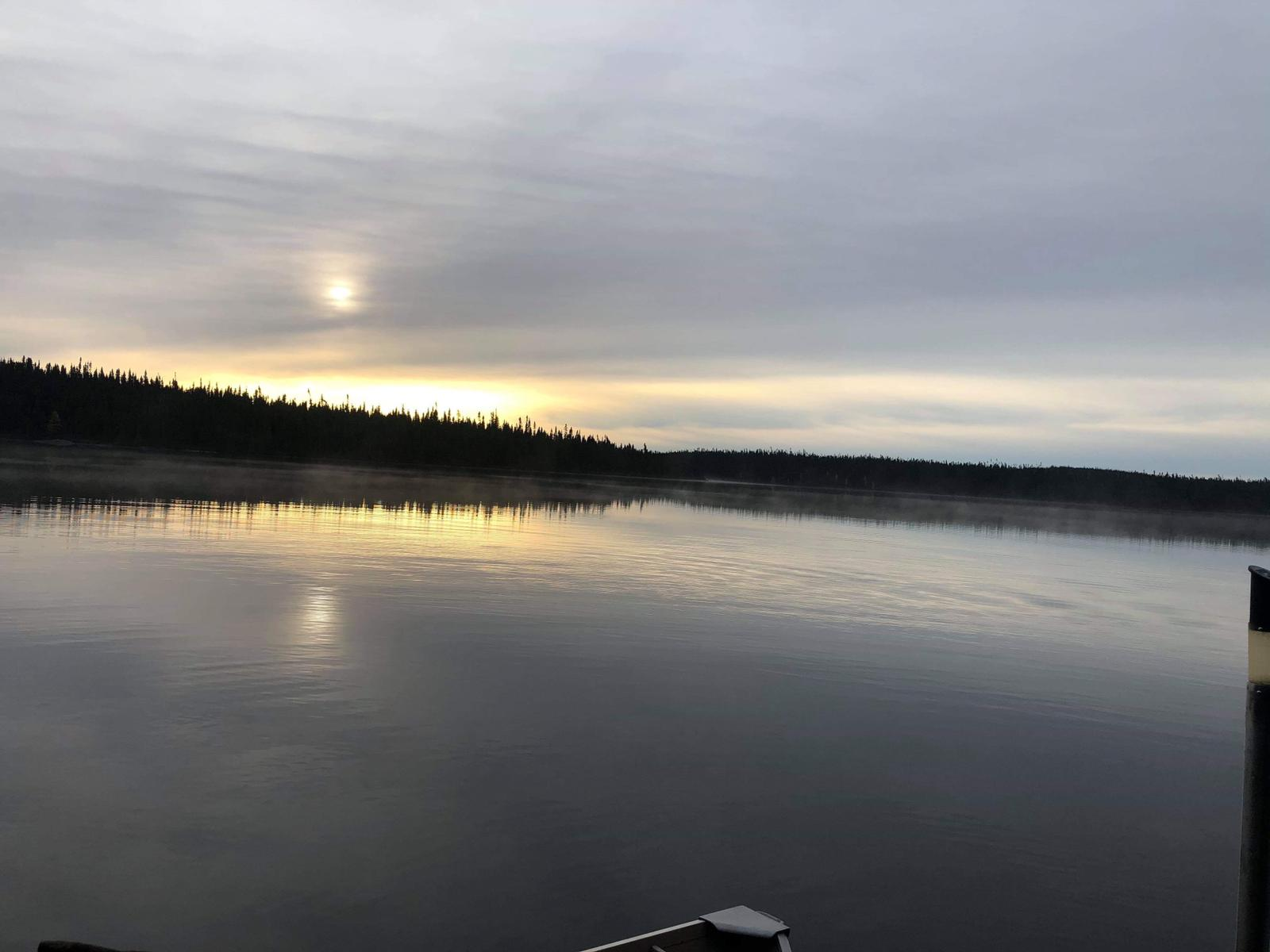
- Bouteroue Lake in July 2020

- Location within Quebec
- Location: Le Domaine-du-Roy (RCM)
- Coordinates: 49°20′23″N 74°14′51″W
- Type: Natural
- Primary inflows: (clockwise); outlet of a lake Bévy; outlet of set of lakes such Finbar, Mondoux, du Cidre, Nargis, Caldwell, des Épines, Vandalle and des Perceurs; outlet of lake Rhéa; outlet of lake Mayac; outlet of lac Ribemont; outlet of lake Madère; outlet of lake Djebel; outlet of Rohault Lake; outlet of lakes Asasp and du Mégot; outlet of lake Huez; outlet of lake Pertain; outlet of lake Ivors; outlet of lake Nioche.
- Primary outflows: Bouteroue Creek
- Basin countries: Canada
- Max. length: 16.9 kilometres (10.5 mi)
- Max. width: 2.2 kilometres (1.4 mi)
- Surface area: 83.87 kilometres (52.11 mi)
- Surface elevation: 402 metres (1,319 ft)

Bouteroue Lake is a freshwater body of the Lac-Ashuapmushuan, Quebec unorganized territory, in the northwestern part of the Regional County Municipality (MRC) Le Domaine-du-Roy, in the administrative region of Saguenay-Lac-Saint-Jean, in the province of Quebec, in Canada. This lake borders the townships of Rohault, Robert, Ducharme and Bouteroue.

Forestry is the main economic activity of the sector, followed by tourism.

The forest road route 167 passes north-east of Nicabau Lake, connecting Chibougamau to Saint-Félicien, Quebec. The Canadian National Railway runs along this road. The northern part of lake Bouteroue is served by the forest road serving the Nemenjiche River.

Lake Bouteroue's surface is usually frozen from early November to mid-May, however, safe ice movement is generally from mid-November to mid-April.

== Geography ==
On the east side of Rohault Lake, the lake Bouteroue has a length of 16.9 kilometres (10.5 mi), a maximum width of 2.2 kilometres (1.4 mi) and a maximum of altitude of 402 metres (1,319 ft). The outline of the lake has a complex shape with five parts:
- the northern part of about twenty islands, which receives the waters of Rohault Lake and has a bay to the northeast;
- that part of the east which forms a U-shaped bay (open to the north) with a length of 3.7 kilometres (2.3 mi);
- that part of the West with a peninsula of 2.2 kilometres (1.4 mi) oriented towards the South which gives it the shape of a U (open to the North), receiving the dumps of Lake Madeira, Djebel, Ribemont and Mayac; and also receiving the current coming from the North;
- the central part of a length of 7.1 kilometres (4.4 mi) (North-South axis) receiving the waters of the Pertain, Ivors and Rhea lakes;
- the southern part of a length of 7.6 kilometres (4.7 mi) in the form of a double hook (one North hook is the "Bay of Wisdom" and the other hook, the bay of the mouth of the lake ), receiving the discharge from Finbar Lake.

The mouth of lake Bouteroue is located at:

- 5.7 kilometres (3.5 mi) south of the mouth of Bouteroue Creek (confluence with the Normandin River);
- 6.9 kilometres (4.3 mi) northwest of the mouth of Poutrincourt Lake;
- 27.1 kilometres (16.8 mi) west of the mouth of the Normandin River (confluence with Ashuapmushuan Lake);
- 148.1 kilometres (92.0 mi) northwest of the mouth of the Ashuapmushuan River (confluence with Lac Saint-Jean);
- 188.8 kilometres (117.3 mi) west of the mouth of lac Saint-Jean (confluence with the Saguenay River).

The main hydrographic slopes near Lac Bouteroue are:

- North side: Nicabau Lake, Coquille River (Normandin River), La Dauversière Lake, Énard River, Chibougamau Lake;
- East side: Chaudière River (Normandin River), Normandin River, Bouteroue Creek, Nicabau Lake;
- South side: Buade Lake (Normandin River), Poutrincourt Lake, Marquette River West, Ventadour River, Titipiti River;
- West side: Rohault Lake, Nemenjiche Lake, Opawica River, Gabriel Lake (Opawica River), Surprise Lake (Roy River), Cawcot River.

From the dam at the mouth of Bouteroue Lake, the current flows down Bouteroue Creek to a bay at

South of Nicabau Lake. The latter is mainly fed by the Boisvert River (Normandin River) (coming from the North) and the Normandin River (coming from the South). The Normandin River flows southeast to Ashuapmushuan Lake which is the head lake of the Ashuapmushuan River.

== Toponymy ==
Formerly, this body of water was designated "Owen Lake".

The toponym "Lac Bouteroue" was made official on December 5, 1968, by the Commission de toponymie du Québec, i.e. at the creation of this commission.

== See also ==
- Lac Saint-Jean, a body of water
- Ashuapmushuan River, a watercourse
- Ashuapmushuan Lake, a body of water
- Normandin River, a watercourse
- Nicabau Lake, a body of water
- Bouteroue Creek, a watercourse
- Rohault Lake, a body of water
- Le Domaine-du-Roy, a regional county municipality (MRC)
- Lac-Ashuapmushuan, Quebec, an unorganized territory
- List of lakes in Canada
