= Coquille River (Normandin River tributary) =

Coquille
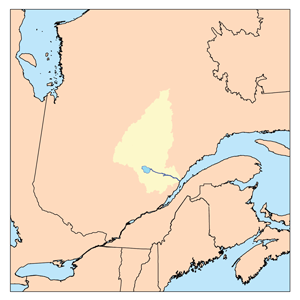
- Watershed of Saguenay River

Location
- Country: Canada
- Province: Quebec
- Region: Saguenay-Lac-Saint-Jean

Physical characteristics
- Source: Hogan lake
  - location: Lac-Ashuapmushuan, Quebec, Le Domaine-du-Roy (RCM), Saguenay-Lac-Saint-Jean, Quebec
  - coordinates: 49°30′39″N 74°03′27″W
  - elevation: 405 m (1,329 ft)
- Mouth: Nicabau Lake
  - location: Lac-Ashuapmushuan, Quebec, Le Domaine-du-Roy (RCM), Saguenay-Lac-Saint-Jean, Quebec
  - coordinates: 49°24′36″N 74°07′28″W
  - elevation: 386 m (1,266 ft)
- Length: 20.5 km (12.7 mi)

Basin features
- Tributaries
  - left: (upstream); outlet of lakes Lavazan, Flainval, Romette and Baily; outlet of lakes Bellot, des Charagnes and Loivre; outlet of lake Marsal.
  - right: (upstream); outlet of lake Loreto; outlet of lake Crolles; outlet of lake Hancourt.

The Coquille River is a tributary of Nicabau Lake, flowing into the unorganized territory of Lac-Ashuapmushuan, Quebec, into the Regional County Municipality (RCM) of Le Domaine-du-Roy, in the administrative region of Saguenay-Lac-Saint-Jean, in Quebec, in Canada.

This river crosses successively the cantons of Charron and Ducharme. This river is part of the Ashuapmushuan Wildlife Reserve. Forestry is the main economic activity of this valley; recreational tourism activities, second.

A secondary forest road (heading north-east) that connects to route 167 serves the upper part of the "Coquille River" valley passing north of Lake Liasse and South of "Coquille Lake". Route 167 between Chibougamau and Saint-Félicien, Quebec passes on the west side of the lower part of the river.

The surface of the Coquille River is usually frozen from early November to mid-May, however, safe ice circulation is generally from mid-November to mid-April.

== Geography ==
The hydrographic slopes near the Coquille River are:

- north side: Lac de la Coquille, Charron Lake (Normandin River), Boisvert River (Normandin River), Boisvert Lake;
- east side: Chaudière River (Normandin River), Tonnerre River (Normandin River);
- south side: Nicabau Lake, Tonnerre River (Normandin River), Normandin River, Bouteroue Creek;
- west side: Charron Lake (Normandin River), Malo Lake, Obatogamau Lakes, La Dauversière Lake.

The "Coquille River" originates at the mouth of "Coquille Lake" (length: 7.1 kilometres (4.4 mi); 405 metres (1,329 ft)) located in the township of Charron.

The mouth of this head lake is located at:

- 6.1 kilometres (3.8 mi) east of Charron Lake (Normandin River);
- 12.2 kilometres (7.6 mi) north of the mouth of the "Coquille River" (confluence with the Nicabau Lake);
- 17.9 kilometres (11.1 mi) north of the mouth of the Nicabau Lake whose southern portion is crossed by the Normandin River;
- 39.2 kilometres (24.4 mi) northwest of the mouth of the Normandin River (confluence with Ashuapmushuan Lake.

From the mouth of "Coquille Lake", the "Coquille River" flows over 20.5 kilometres (12.7 mi) according to the following segments:

- 4.7 kilometres (2.9 mi) southwesterly in Charron Township forming a southeasterly curve in marsh areas to the northern limit of Ducharme Township, corresponding to the dump (coming from the South-East) of "Lac des Charagnes";
- 4.8 kilometres (3.0 mi) westward in Charron township, including crossing Pommelé Lake (length: 0.9 kilometres (0.56 mi); altitude: 407 metres (1,335 ft) ) to the northern limit of the township of Ducharme;
- 1.7 kilometres (1.1 mi) southwesterly in Ducharme Township to the north shore of Liasse Lake;
- 5.3 kilometres (3.3 mi) southerly crossing Liasse Lake (elevation: 392 metres (1,286 ft)) consisting of a widening of the river to its mouth;
- 4.0 kilometres (2.5 mi) to the south, in particular crossing Troilet lake (length: 1.3 kilometres (0.81 mi); altitude: 390 metres (1,280 ft)), up to mouth of the river.

The "Coquille River" flows into a bay on the northeast shore of Nicabau Lake (length: 9.7 kilometres (6.0 mi) altitude: 386 metres (1,266 ft)) which is crossed on 9.0 kilometres (5.6 mi) towards the South, then towards the East, by the current of the Coquille River. From there, the current flows south-east along the Normandin River on 38.7 kilometres (24.0 mi) to the northwestern shore of Ashuapmushuan Lake. Then, the current flows through the Ashuapmushuan River which flows to Saint-Félicien, Quebec on the west shore of Lac Saint-Jean.

The confluence of the Coquille River with the Nicabau Lake is located at:

- 8.8 kilometres (5.5 mi) north-east of the mouth of Rohault Lake;
- 7.2 kilometres (4.5 mi) north of the mouth of Nicabau Lake whose southern part is crossed by the Normandin River;
- 33.1 kilometres (20.6 mi) northwest of the mouth of the Normandin River (confluence with Ashuapmushuan Lake;
- 154 kilometres (96 mi) northwest of the mouth of the Ashuapmushuan River (confluence with lac Saint-Jean).

== Toponymy ==
The toponym "rivière de la Coquille" was formalized on June 18, 1971, at the Commission de toponymie du Québec, when it was created.

== See also ==
- Estuary of Saint Lawrence
- List of rivers of Quebec
