= Chaudière River (Normandin River tributary) =

Chaudière

Location
- Country: Canada
- Province: Quebec
- Region: Côte-Nord

Physical characteristics
- Source: Chaudière Lake
  - location: Lac-Ashuapmushuan, Quebec (unorganized territory), MRC Le Domaine-du-Roy, Saguenay-Lac-Saint-Jean, Quebec
  - coordinates: 49°26′13″N 74°03′34″W
  - elevation: 406 m (1,332 ft)
- Mouth: Normandin River
  - location: Lac-Ashuapmushuan, Quebec (unorganized territory), MRC Le Domaine-du-Roy, Saguenay-Lac-Saint-Jean, Quebec
  - coordinates: 49°20′27″N 73°58′21″W
  - elevation: 383 m (1,257 ft)
- Length: 85 km (53 mi)

Basin features
- Tributaries
  - left: (upstream); outlet of lake Achen; outlet of lakes Castonguay; and des Sagitaires; Atouk creek; outlet of set of lakes such Urcuit; outlet of lake Horus; outlet of lakes Caporal and Fémur; outlet of lake Menneron.
  - right: (upstream); outlet of lake Semond; outlet of lakes Lutran; and du Lion; outlet of lakes Rabot and Ledden; outlet of lakes Meté; and de l'Épave; outlet of lake Praslin, lac du Bonhomme; outlet of lakes Acy and Écublé; outlet of lakes du Satyre and Eaton; outlet of lake Targé; outlet of lakes Melrand and Argein; (via the lake de la Navette); outlet of lake Sifflet.

The Chaudiere River is a tributary of the Normandin River, flowing into the unorganized territory of Lac-Ashuapmushuan, Quebec, into the Regional County Municipality (MRC) of Le Domaine-du-Roy, in the administrative region of Saguenay-Lac-Saint-Jean, Quebec, Canada.

The Chaudière River flows in the townships of Vimont, Mance, Mignault and Aigremont. Forestry is the main economic activity of this valley; recreational tourism activities, second.

The route 167 (northwesterly) connecting Chibougamau to Saint-Félicien, Quebec intersects the lower (i.e., southerly) section of the river Chaudière. The Canadian National Railway runs along this road. The forest road R0210 serves the upper part of the river that it cuts near the mouth of the head lake; it also serves the eastern part of this valley.

The surface of the Chaudière River is usually frozen from early November to mid-May; however, safe ice circulation is generally from mid-November to mid-April.

== Geography ==
The hydrographic slopes near the Chaudière River are:
- north side: Dobleau River, Dobleau Lake, Vimont Lake, Épervier River, Hogan River;
- east side: Greves River, Hilarion River, Chief River, Ashuapmushuan River, Aigremont Lake;
- south side: Normandin River, Poutrincourt Lake, Marquette River West;
- west side: Nicabau Lake, Rohault Lake, Bouteroue Lake, Boisvert River (Normandin River), Tonnerre River (Normandin River).

The Chaudière River originates at the mouth of lake Chaudière (length: 3.2 kilometres (2.0 mi); width: 1.5 kilometres (0.93 mi); altitude: 422 metres (1,385 ft)) in the canton of Mance. The mouth of this head lake is located at:

- 21.8 kilometres (13.5 mi) north-east of Nicabau Lake;
- 25.2 kilometres (15.7 mi) northwest of the mouth of the Chaudière River (confluence with the Normandin River);
- 29.3 kilometres (18.2 mi) northwest of Chibougamau Lake;
- 25.9 kilometres (16.1 mi) north-east of Obatogamau Lakes;
- 41.7 kilometres (25.9 mi) northwest of the mouth of the Normandin River (confluence with Ashuapmushuan Lake);
- 154.3 kilometres (95.9 mi) northwest of the mouth of the Ashuapmushuan River (confluence with lac Saint-Jean).

From the mouth of lake Chaudière, the Chaudière River flows over 42.3 kilometres (26.3 mi), according to the following segments:

Upper Chaudière River (segment of 21.7 kilometres (13.5 mi))

- 4.6 kilometres (2.9 mi) southwesterly to the north shore of lac de la Navette;
- 1.2 kilometres (0.75 mi) south-east across Lake Shuttle (length: 2.5 kilometres (1.6 mi); altitude: 417 metres (1,368 ft)). Note: This lake is fed on the West side by Melrand and Argein lakes;
- 3.9 kilometres (2.4 mi) to the southeast, including crossing Kelly Lake (length: 0.7 kilometres (0.43 mi); altitude: 416 metres (1,365 ft)) on its full length and Cawood Lake (length: 2.0 kilometres (1.2 mi); altitude: 416 metres (1,365 ft)) on 1.0 kilometre (0.62 mi) to its mouth;
- 2.8 kilometres (1.7 mi) southerly crossing Pillar Lake (length: 2.5 kilometres (1.6 mi); altitude: 415 metres (1,362 ft)). Note: This lake is fed on the east side by the outlet of the Lac de la Galerie;
- 9.2 kilometres (5.7 mi) winding south-west, then crossing the south-eastern part of Lac du Bonhomme on 3.5 kilometres (2.2 mi) (length: 5.7 kilometres (3.5 mi); altitude: 401 metres (1,316 ft)), to its mouth. Note: This lake has a complex shape and receives upstream the waters of the landfill of a group of lakes including Auberge, Ginette, Kief and Chatelraux; and on the west side, the discharge of Bellot and Charagnes lakes;

Lower Chaudière River (segment of 20.6 kilometres (12.8 mi))

From the mouth of "Lac du Bonhomme", the course of the Chaudière River flows over:

- 4.8 kilometres (3.0 mi) southerly to the bridge of forest road R0210;
- 8.9 kilometres (5.5 mi) south winding, forming a loop southwestward to a creek (coming from the North) spilling into a river bend;
- 2.9 kilometres (1.8 mi) winding southward to the outlet (from the east) of Castonguay and Sagitarians lakes;
- 3.4 kilometres (2.1 mi) southerly forming a deflection to the west to collect the outlet of Semond Lake, to route 167;
- 0.6 kilometres (0.37 mi) southeasterly by cutting the Canadian National Railway and crossing a small unidentified lake to its mouth.

The confluence of the Chaudière River with the Normandin River is located at:

- 8.0 kilometres (5.0 mi) north-east of the mouth of Nicabau Lake which is crossed by the Normandin River;
- 19.9 kilometres (12.4 mi) northwest of the mouth of the Normandin River (confluence with Ashuapmushuan Lake);
- 141.6 kilometres (88.0 mi) northwest of the mouth of the Ashuapmushuan River (confluence with lac Saint-Jean);
- 180 kilometres (110 mi) northwest of the mouth of lac Saint-Jean (confluence with the Saguenay River).
The Chaudière River flows into a river bend on the north shore of the Normandin River, downstream of Nicabau Lake and Lake Ducharme. From there, the current flows south-east along the Normandin River on 24.9 kilometres (15.5 mi) to the northwestern shore of Ashuapmushuan Lake. Then, the current flows along the Ashuapmushuan River (length: 193 kilometres (120 mi), which flows to Saint-Félicien, Quebec on the west shore of lac Saint Jean.

== Toponymy ==
The name "Rivière Chaudière" was made official on December 5, 1968, at the Commission de toponymie du Québec, that is, at its creation.

== See also ==
- Saguenay River
- Lac Saint-Jean, a body of water
- Ashuapmushuan River, a watercourse
- Ashuapmushuan Lake, a body of water
- Normandin River, a watercourse
- Lac-Ashuapmushuan, Quebec, an unorganized territory
- Le Domaine-du-Roy, a regional county municipality (MRC)
- List of rivers of Quebec
