= Little Buade Lake =

- Location within Quebec
- Location: Le Domaine-du-Roy (RCM), Saguenay-Lac-Saint-Jean
- Coordinates: 48°58′14″N 74°13′52″W
- Type: Lake of dam
- Primary inflows: (clockwise); Outlet of Rothau Lake.; Outlet of a set of lakes such as Aylmor, St-Nom, De la Voute, Du Savon, Du Canso, Watter, Austin, Beaussier, Du Camp, Secondat and Frontenac.; Outlet of lakes Des Épervières and Dième.
- Primary outflows: Normandin River
- Basin countries: Canada
- Max. length: 5.1 kilometres (3.2 mi)
- Max. width: 1.1 kilometres (0.68 mi)
- Surface elevation: 400 metres (1,300 ft)

Little Buade Lake is a freshwater body of the unorganized territory of Lac-Ashuapmushuan, Quebec in the western part of the Regional County Municipality (MRC) Le Domaine-du-Roy, in the Saguenay-Lac-Saint-Jean administrative region, in the province of Quebec, in Canada.

This lake straddles the townships of Buade and Ventadour.

Forestry is the main economic activity of the sector, followed by recreational tourism activities.

The forest road route 212 connecting Obedjiwan, Quebec and La Tuque passes south of Dubois Lake and Buade Lake (Normandin River). Other secondary forest roads serve the vicinity of the lake.

The surface of Little Buade Lake is usually frozen from early November to mid-May, but safe ice circulation is generally from mid-November to mid-April.

== Geography ==
This lake has a length of 5.1 kilometres (3.2 mi), a maximum width of 1.1 kilometres (0.68 mi) and an altitude of 400 metres (1,300 ft). The Little Buade Lake is in the shape of a T looking eastward.

The mouth of Little Buade Lake is located at:

- 19.6 kilometres (12.2 mi) south of the confluence of Buade Lake (Normandin River);
- 32.8 kilometres (20.4 mi) south of the mouth of Poutrincourt Lake;
- 43.7 kilometres (27.2 mi) south of the mouth of Nicabau Lake;
- 48.2 kilometres (30.0 mi) southwest of the mouth of the Normandin River (confluence with Ashuapmushuan Lake);
- 5.4 kilometres (3.4 mi) south-east of the Eeyou Istchee James Bay (municipality) boundary;
- 143.5 kilometres (89.2 mi) south-west of the mouth of the Ashuapmushuan River (confluence with lac Saint-Jean.

The main hydrographic slopes near "Petit Lac Buade" (Little Buade Lake) are:

- North side: Anctil Lake, Normandin River, Marquette River, Poutrincourt Lake, Titipiti River;
- East side: Frontenac Lake, Marquette Lake, Du Milieu River (Poutrincourt Lake), Marquette River West, Marquette River;
- South side: Townsend Creek, Wapous River, Oskatcickic Creek;
- west side: Dubois Lake, Normandin Lake (Normandin River), Pokotciminike River, Toussaint River.
From the mouth of Little Buade Lake, the current of the Normandin River flows over 28.0 kilometres (17.4 mi) to the north.

== Toponymy ==
The toponym "Petit Lac Buade" (English: Little Buade Lake) was formalized on December 5, 1968, by the Commission de toponymie du Québec, i.e. at the creation of this commission.

== See also ==
- Saguenay River, a watercourse
- Lac Saint-Jean, a body of water
- Ashuapmushuan River, a watercourse
- Ashuapmushuan Lake, a body of water
- Normandin River, a watercourse
- Le Domaine-du-Roy, a regional county municipality (MRC)
- Lac-Ashuapmushuan, Quebec, an unorganized territory
