= Normandin River =

River in Le Domaine-du-Roy, Quebec

Normandin Old name: "Nicabau River"
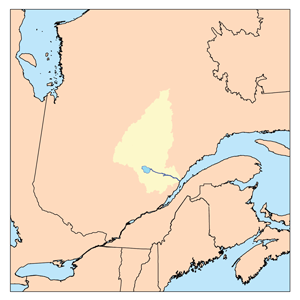
- Watershed of Saguenay river

Location
- Country: Canada
- Province: Quebec
- Region: Nord-du-Québec

Physical characteristics
- Source: Normandin Lake (Normandin River)
  - location: Lac-Ashuapmushuan, Quebec, Le Domaine-du-Roy (RCM), Saguenay-Lac-Saint-Jean, Quebec
  - coordinates: 48°57′09″N 74°15′41″W
  - elevation: 403 m (1,322 ft)
- Mouth: Ashuapmushuan Lake
  - location: Lac-Ashuapmushuan, Quebec, Le Domaine-du-Roy (RCM), Saguenay-Lac-Saint-Jean, Quebec
  - coordinates: 49°12′12″N 73°47′51″W
  - elevation: 371 m (1,217 ft)
- Length: 59.2 km (36.8 mi)

Basin features
- Tributaries
  - left: (upstream); outlet of lakes Connexe and Du Sentier; outlet of lakes Du Potamot, des Jonquilles and Caubel; outlet of Ritchot Lake; outlet of Damgan Lake; outlet of Kurtness Lake; Chaudière River (Normandin River); outlet of lakes Caplet, Bubie and Életot; outlet of lakes Euterpe and Des Bleuets; Tonnerre River (Normandin River).; (Upstream of Nicabau Lake); Bouteroue Creek (via Nicabau Lake); outlet of Cottenoir Lake; (see Poutrincourt Lake); outlet of lake De la Malice; outlet of Leeds Lake; (see Buade Lake (Normandin River)); outlet of lakes Joigny, Arnoux and Petit lac Arnoux; (see Normandin Lake (Normandin River)).
  - right: (upstream); outlet of a set of lakes such « en épingle », Profile, Des Roseaux, De l’Orient, Gohèle, De la Salade and Triste; outlet of lakes Boron and Mouflé; outlet of a set of lakes such Machidon, Priziac, Catheux, Verderel, Monviel, Estirac and Tortu; outlet of lake Carnin; outlet of lakes de la Levée and Augremont; outlet of lake des Cèphes; outlet of lake Poire; outlet of a set of lakes such De la Peruque, Ryes, Falicon, Pougy and des Sapinettes.; (Upstream of Nicabau Lake); outlet of lakes Sophie, Serpenteau, Fixin, Joyeux, Ourton, Docile and Élise; outlet of Coulvain Lake; (see Poutrincourt Lake); outlet of lakes Carquois and Radis; outlet of Haget Lake; (see Buade Lake (Normandin River)); outlet of Névian Lake; outlet of lakes Ars, Mayo and Édern; (see Little Buade Lake).

The Normandin River is a tributary of the north shore of Ashuapmushuan Lake, flowing into the unorganized territory of Lac-Ashuapmushuan, Quebec, into the Regional County Municipality (RCM) of Le Domaine-du-Roy, in the administrative region of Saguenay-Lac-Saint-Jean, in Quebec, in Canada.

This river crosses successively the cantons of Ventadour, Buade, Poutrincourt, Bouteroue, Ducharme, Aigremont and Grahamé. Forestry is the main economic activity of the sector; recreational tourism activities, second.

The southern part of the Normandin River Valley is served by route 212 which connects Obedjiwan, Quebec to La Tuque and passes south of Dubois Lake and Normandin Lake (Normandin River). From there, the forest road R0212 (East-West direction) cuts the course of the Normandin River.

The surface of the Normandin River is usually frozen from early November to mid-May, however, safe ice circulation is generally from mid-November to mid-April.

== Geography ==
The hydrographic slopes adjacent to the Normandin River are:
- north side: Nicabau Lake, Coquille River (Normandin River), Boisvert River (Normandin River), Tonnerre River (Normandin River), Chaudière River (Normandin River);
- east side: Marquette River West, Marquette River, Ashuapmushuan River, Ashuapmushuan Lake;
- south side: Townsend Creek, Berlinguet Lake, Wabano River West, Palluau Lake, Marquette River West, Marquette River;
- west side: Titipiti River, Ventadour River, Feuquières Lake, Bouteroue Creek, Bouteroue Lake, Rohault Lake.

The Normandin River originates at the mouth of a Normandin Lake (Normandin River) (length: 6.7 kilometres (4.2 mi) altitude: 403 metres (1,322 ft)) in the Township of Ventadour. The mouth of this lake is located in Ashuapmushuan Wildlife Reserve at 5.1 kilometres (3.2 mi) west of the Eeyou Istchee James Bay (municipality) boundary and the Regional County Municipality (RCM) Le Domaine-du-Roy.

Lake Normandin is mainly fed by Townsend Creek (south side) and the outlet (from the North) of a series of other lakes including Anctil, Vinet, Dorval and Képi.

The mouth of Lake Normandin is located at:

- 4.8 kilometres (3.0 mi) south of the mouth of the Little Buade Lake;
- 21.9 kilometres (13.6 mi) south of the mouth of Buade Lake (Normandin River);
- 31.2 kilometres (19.4 mi) south of the mouth of Poutrincourt Lake;

South of the mouth of Nicabau Lake;

- 43.7 kilometres (27.2 mi) south-west of the mouth of the Normandin River;
- 143.8 kilometres (89.4 mi) west of the confluence of the Ashuapmushuan River with lac Saint-Jean;
- 186.5 kilometres (115.9 mi) west of the mouth of lac Saint-Jean (confluence with Saguenay River).

From the mouth of Normandin Lake (Normandin River), the Normandin River flows over 98.4 kilometres (61.1 mi) according to the following segments:

Upper Normandin River (segment of 33.4 kilometres (20.8 mi))

- 0.3 kilometres (0.19 mi) northeasterly in Ventadour Township to the southwest shore of Little Buade Lake;
- 5.1 kilometres (3.2 mi) northeasterly across the lake Little Buade Lake (elevation: 400 metres (1,300 ft)) on its full length to the dam at its mouth. Note: The boundary of the townships of Ventadour and Buade is located in the middle of this lake;
- 5.1 kilometres (3.2 mi) north through the "Foul Fall" to the south bay of Buade Lake (Normandin River);
- 22.9 kilometres (14.2 mi) to the north, crossing the Buade Lake (Normandin River) (elevation: 392 metres (1,286 ft)), over its full length;

Intermediate part of the Normandin River (segment of 26.3 kilometres (16.3 mi))

- 5.4 kilometres (3.4 mi) to the North forming a hook to the East, to the South Bay of Poutrincourt Lake;
- 5.8 kilometres (3.6 mi) north through the central part of Poutrincourt Lake (elevation: 392 metres (1,286 ft)). Note: the boundaries of the townships of Bouterque and Poutrincourt cut the northern zone of this lake;
- 15.6 kilometres (9.7 mi) north forming a hook of 2.0 kilometres (1.2 mi) easterly to the south bay of Nicabau Lake;
- 5.3 kilometres (3.3 mi) either 1.8 kilometres (1.1 mi) north in Bouteroue township, then east in Ducharme township) crossing the southern part of Nicabau Lake (altitude: 386 metres (1,266 ft)).

Lower Normandin River (segment of 38.7 kilometres (24.0 mi))

- 2.5 kilometres (1.6 mi) eastward in Ducharme Township to the west shore of Ducharme Lake;
- 3.1 kilometres (1.9 mi) easterly crossing Ducharme Lake (elevation: 382 metres (1,253 ft)) on its full length, to the limit of the Ducharme townships and d'Aigremont;
- 8.2 kilometres (5.1 mi) easterly in the Township of Mignault, forming a loop of 1.7 kilometres (1.1 mi) southerly to the mouth of the Chaudière River (Normandin River);
- 12.8 kilometres (8.0 mi) southeasterly forming some serpentines, to a road bridge;
- 12.1 kilometres (7.5 mi) southeasterly to its mouth.

The Normandin River flows into a bay on the northwestern shore of Ashuapmushuan Lake. From there, the current flows through the Ashuapmushuan River which flows to Saint-Félicien, Quebec on the west shore of Lac Saint-Jean.

The confluence of the Normandin River with the Ashuapmushuan Lake is located at:

- 122.6 kilometres (76.2 mi) northwest of the mouth of the Ashuapmushuan River (confluence with lac Saint-Jean);
- 162 kilometres (101 mi) east of the mouth of Lac Saint-Jean;
- 321.6 kilometres (199.8 mi) east of the mouth of the Saguenay River (confluence with the Estuary of Saint Lawrence).

== Toponymy ==
The term "Normandin" is a family name of French origin.

The toponym "Normandin River" was formalized on December 5, 1968, at the Commission de toponymie du Québec, when it was created.

== See also ==
- Estuary of Saint Lawrence
- Saguenay River
- Lac Saint-Jean, a body of water
- Ashuapmushuan River, a watercourse
- Ashuapmushuan Lake, a body of water
- Milieu River (Normandin River), a watercourse
- Boisvert River (Normandin River), a watercourse
- Coquille River (Normandin River), a watercourse
- Tonnerre River (Normandin River), a watercourse
- Chaudière River (Normandin River), a watercourse
- Normandin Lake (Normandin River), a body of water
- Little Buade Lake, a body of water
- Buade Lake (Normandin River), a body of water
- Poutrincourt Lake, a body of water
- Nicabau Lake, a body of water
- Lac-Ashuapmushuan, Quebec, an unorganized territory
- Le Domaine-du-Roy, a regional county municipality (MRC)
- List of rivers of Quebec
