= Ashuapmushuan =

Ashuapmushuan may refer to:

- Unorganized territory of Lac-Ashuapmushuan, Quebec, Canada
- Ashuapmushuan Wildlife Reserve, Quebec, Canada
- Ashuapmushuan Lake, in the Ashuapmushuan Wildlife Reserve
- Ashuapmushuan River, Quebec, Canada
