= Marquette River =

Marquette
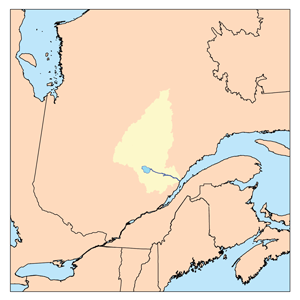
- Watershed of Saguenay River

Location
- Country: Canada
- Province: Quebec
- Region: Saguenay-Lac-Saint-Jean

Physical characteristics
- Source: Marquette Lake
  - location: Lac-Ashuapmushuan, Quebec, Le Domaine-du-Roy (RCM), Saguenay-Lac-Saint-Jean, Quebec
  - coordinates: 48°57′25″N 73°56′13″W
  - elevation: 411 m (1,348 ft)
- Mouth: Ashuapmushuan Lake
  - location: Lac-Ashuapmushuan, Quebec, Le Domaine-du-Roy (RCM), Saguenay-Lac-Saint-Jean, Quebec
  - coordinates: 49°11′24″N 73°47′48″W
  - elevation: 371 m (1,217 ft)
- Length: 64.9 km (40.3 mi)

Basin features
- Tributaries
  - left: (upstream); outlet of lakes Licourt, Morangis, Léning, Tarrane, Arvigna and Moncourt; outlet of lake Pelligard; Marquette River West; outlet of a set of lakes such Tiffaut, Salettes, Pélussin and Polisot; outlet of lakes Pépieux and Haltère; outlet of lake Hugier; outlet of lakes such Shoupash, Lagrand and Bouley; outlet of a set of lakes such Merrant, Appy, Cauro, Boisel, Loquast, des Pyrales, Loquast et Barabé; outlet of lakes Civin and Guilon.
  - right: (upstream); outlet of lake du Méandre, lac Kaputshikananan, ruisseau Arlequin; outlet of lake Rougeau; oulet of lake Accroché; outlet of lake Nedde; outlet of lake Flassan; outlet of lakes des Sitelles, Abère, Monieux, Fenols, Larpiniere, Buzon, Bâtonnet, Labarre, Pivin, Gurat and Ringuet; outlet of lake Glénac; outlet of lake du lac Violon; outlet of lake Illinois.

Marquette River (French: Rivière Marquette, pronounced [ʁivjɛʁ maʁkɛt]) is a tributary of Ashuapmushuan Lake, flowing into the unorganized territory of Lac-Ashuapmushuan, Quebec, into the Regional County Municipality (RCM) of Le Domaine-du-Roy, in the administrative region from Saguenay-Lac-Saint-Jean, in Quebec, in Canada.

The Marquette River runs successively in the townships of Châteauford, Cramahé and Aigremont. The central part of the river flows through the Ashuapmushuan Wildlife Reserve. Forestry is the main economic activity of this valley; recreational tourism activities, second.

The Forest Road R0212 (East-West) intersects the upper portion of the Marquette River. The route 167 connecting Chibougamau to Saint-Félicien, Québec passes on the north-east shore of the Normandin River and the Northeast side of Ashuapmushuan Lake.

The surface of the Marquette River is usually frozen from early November to mid-May, however, safe ice movement is generally from mid-November to mid-April.

== Geography ==
The adjacent hydrographic slopes of the Marquette River are:
- north side: Normandin River, Ashuapmushuan Lake, Ashuapmushuan River;
- east side: Harlequin Creek, Ashuapmushuan Lake, Licorne River;
- south side: Marquette Lake, Loup River West (Ashuapmushuan Lake);
- west side: Poutrincourt Lake, Normandin River, Milieu River (Normandin River), Frontenac Lake (Milieu River).

The Marquette River originates at the mouth of the Marquette Lake (length: 14.0 kilometres (8.7 mi); width: 1.7 kilometres (1.1 mi); altitude: 411 metres (1,348 ft)) which overlaps the townships of Marquette and Châteaufort. This lake is mainly fed by the discharge (coming from the North-East) of the lakes of Beaurrieux, Tombelle and Fouquet, as well as the discharge of Lake Matié. The mouth of this head lake is located at:

- 12.7 kilometres (7.9 mi) north-east of Frontenac Lake (Milieu River);
- 16.0 kilometres (9.9 mi) south-east of a bay Poutrincourt Lake which is crossed by the Normandin River;
- 27.9 kilometres (17.3 mi) south-west of the mouth of the Marquette River (confluence with Ashuapmushuan Lake;
- 121 kilometres (75 mi) west of the mouth of the Ashuapmushuan River (confluence with lac Saint-Jean);

From the mouth of Marquette Lake, the Marquette River flows over 64.9 kilometres (40.3 mi), according to the following segments:

- 25.4 kilometres (15.8 mi) north, northeast, then northwest in Châteaufort Township, forming small streamers and crossing some marsh areas at the end of the segment, until the limit of the cantons of Châteaufort and Cramahé;
- 18.4 kilometres (11.4 mi) northwesterly in Cramahé Township forming a hook of 1.6 kilometres (0.99 mi) southwesterly to the confluence of the Marquette River West (coming from North-West);
- 15.7 kilometres (9.8 mi) north-east forming a loop towards the South, to the limit of the townships of Cramahé and Aigremont;
- 1.4 kilometres (0.87 mi) forming a loop towards the North in the canton of Aigremont, then returns to the limit of the cantons;
- 4.0 kilometres (2.5 mi) south-east passing between two natural jetties on 1.8 kilometres (1.1 mi), to its mouth.

The confluence of the Marquette River with the Ashuapmushuan Lake is located at:

- 1.4 kilometres (0.87 mi) south of the mouth of Ashuapmushuan Lake located at the Canadian National Railway Bridge;
- 42.1 kilometres (26.2 mi) east of Rohault Lake;
- 27.4 kilometres (17.0 mi) south-east of the mouth of Nicabau Lake whose southern portion is crossed by the Normandin River;
- 122 kilometres (76 mi) northwest of the mouth of the Ashuapmushuan River (confluence with Lac Saint-Jean).
The Marquette River flows to the bottom of a bay on the northwestern shore of Ashuapmushuan Lake (length:132.4 kilometres (82.3 mi); maximum width: 2.4 kilometres (1.5 mi); altitude: 371 metres (1,217 ft)) that the current of the Marquette River crosses on the north-east to its mouth. From there, the current flows through the Ashuapmushuan River which flows to Saint-Félicien, Quebec on the west shore of Lac Saint-Jean.

== Toponymy ==
This hydronym evokes the work of life of Jacques Marquette (Laon, France, 1637 - near Luddington, Michigan, 1675). He was a Jesuit missionary and explorer. He first studied Amerindian languages, then he devoted himself to various missions including the Outaouais; in 1671, he founded the mission of Saint-Ignace, among the Wendat (Hurons), on the north shore of the Michilimakinac Strait. In 1672, he met Louis Jolliet with whom he would reach the Mississippi River. He will explore this river to the present border of Arkansas and Louisiana. Anxious to found a mission with the Kaskaskias in the Illinois country, Father Marquette must give it up because of illness.

The toponym "Rivière Marquette" was formalized on December 5, 1968, at the Commission de toponymie du Québec.

== See also ==
- Saguenay River
- Lac Saint-Jean, a body of water
- Ashuapmushuan River, a watercourse
- Ashuapmushuan Lake, a body of water
- Normandin River, a watercourse
- Marquette Lake, a body of water
- Lac-Ashuapmushuan, Quebec, an unorganized territory
- Le Domaine-du-Roy, a regional county municipality (MRC)
- List of rivers of Quebec
