= Marquette River West =

Marquette West
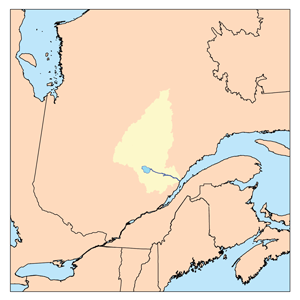
- Watershed of Saguenay River

Location
- Country: Canada
- Province: Quebec
- Region: Saguenay-Lac-Saint-Jean

Physical characteristics
- Source: Coursy Lake
  - location: Lac-Ashuapmushuan, Quebec, Le Domaine-du-Roy (RCM), Saguenay-Lac-Saint-Jean, Quebec
  - coordinates: 48°54′30″N 74°02′32″W
  - elevation: 455 m (1,493 ft)
- Mouth: Ashuapmushuan Lake
  - location: Lac-Ashuapmushuan, Quebec, Le Domaine-du-Roy (RCM), Saguenay-Lac-Saint-Jean, Quebec
  - coordinates: 49°09′14″N 73°55′00″W
  - elevation: 373 m (1,224 ft)
- Length: 54.7 km (34.0 mi)

Basin features
- Tributaries
  - left: (upstream); outlet of a set of lakes such Florimond, des Bardanes, Canny, Enneplon, Ligré, Méreuil and Brezas; outlet of lake Gorbio; outlet of lake Mauran; outlet of lakes Lalancette and Jeamme; outlet of lake Farley; outlet of lakes du Relais, Malbrans, Pinette and Rivest; outlet of lake Bricon; outlet of lake Cassen; outlet of lake Melun; outlet of a set of lakes such Acheux, Cotty, Métapesh and Léoncel; outlet of lakes Duminy and Agrions.
  - right: (upstream); outlet of lakes Cramans, Théophile, Otatau and Glisy; outlet of lake des Codrons; outlet of lake Lacrabe; outlet of lake en retrait; outlet of lakes des Campagnols et Nantoin; outlet of lake Cramahé; outlet of lake Outreau; outlet of lakes Harnoy, Paladru, Rouge and Paula; outlet of lake du Crakia; outlet of lake Jaune; outlet of lakes Macan, Porta and Saléon.

The Marquette West River (French: rivière Marquette Ouest, pronounced [ʁivjɛʁ maʁkɛt wɛst]) is a tributary of the Marquette River, flowing into the unorganized territory of Lac-Ashuapmushuan, Quebec, in the Regional County Municipality (RCM) of Le Domaine-du-Roy, in the administrative region of Saguenay-Lac-Saint-Jean, in Quebec, in Canada.

The Marquette West River flows successively into the townships of Huard, Buade, Poutrincourt and Cramahé. The course of this river is located west of the Ashuapmushuan Wildlife Reserve. Forestry is the main economic activity of this valley; recreational tourism activities, second.

The forest road R0212 (East-West direction) intersects the middle section of the Marquette River West. The route 167 linking Chibougamau to Saint-Félicien, Quebec passes on the north-east side of the Normandin River and on the Northeast of Ashuapmushuan Lake.

The surface of the Marquette West River is usually frozen from early November to mid-May, however, safe ice movement is generally from mid-November to mid-April.

== Geography ==
The adjacent hydrographic slopes of the Marquette West River are:
- north side: Lake Florimond, Poutrincourt Lake, Normandin River, Nicabau Lake;
- east side: Marquette River, Arlequin Creek, Ashuapmushuan Lake, La Licorne River;
- south side: Marquette River, Wabano River West, Baillairgé Lake, Berlinguet Creek;
- west side: Little Buade Lake, Buade Lake (Normandin River), Normandin River, Milieu River (Normandin River).

The Marquette West River originates at the mouth of Coursy Lake (length: 1.6 kilometres (0.99 mi); width: 0.5 kilometres (0.31 mi); altitude: 455 metres (1,493 ft)) which extends in the canton of Huard. This lake is mainly fed by the discharge (coming from the South-West) of Lake Livaie. The mouth of this head lake is located at:

- 28.9 kilometres (18.0 mi) South of the mouth of the Marquette River West (confluence with the Marquette River);
- 5.1 kilometres (3.2 mi) east of a bay southeast of Frontenac Lake (Milieu River);
- 36.1 kilometres (22.4 mi) south-west of the mouth of the Marquette River (confluence with Ashuapmushuan Lake);
- 127.2 kilometres (79.0 mi) west of the mouth of the Ashuapmushuan River (confluence with lac Saint-Jean);

From the mouth of Lake Courcy, the Marquette West River flows over 54.7 kilometres (34.0 mi), according to the following segments:

Upper course of the Marquette West River (segment of 23.2 kilometres (14.4 mi))

- 1.1 kilometres (0.68 mi) northeasterly in the township of Huard, to the limit of the township of Buade;
- 8.1 kilometres (5.0 mi) to the north in Buade Township, crossing Palluau Lake (length: 7.6 kilometres (4.7 mi); altitude: 438 metres (1,437 ft)) on its full length, to its mouth. Note: Palluau Lake has a rather complex shape with four parts separated by peninsulas;
- 6.0 kilometres (3.7 mi) to the northwest by collecting the dump (from the south) of Duminy Lake to a bend in the river;
- 8.0 kilometres (5.0 mi) north-east, to the discharge (coming from the South-East) of a set of lakes including Harnoy, Paladru and Blue Jays;

Intermediate course of the Marquette West River (segment of 20.2 kilometres (12.6 mi))

- 3.0 kilometres (1.9 mi) to the north, forming a few small streamers, to the limit of Poutrincourt township;
- 3.5 kilometres (2.2 mi) northwards in Poutrincourt Township, forming a few small streamers, to the Cramahé Township boundary;
- 7.4 kilometres (4.6 mi) North in Cramahé Township along the Township boundary, collecting the Farley Lake Discharge (from the West) and the West Discharge (from the West). Pinette Lake, to the eastern limit of the township of Poutrincourt;
- 2.6 kilometres (1.6 mi) to the North in a marsh zone in the Township of Poutrincourt, along the limit of the township, to the western limit of the township of Cramahé;
- 3.7 kilometres (2.3 mi) north-east in Cramahé Township forming some streamers, to the discharge (from the Northwest) of Lakes Florimond, Bardanes, Enneplon, Canny, Brezas, Mereuil and Saturnin;

Lower Marquette River West (segment of 11.3 kilometres (7.0 mi))

- 9.3 kilometres (5.8 mi) easterly crossing some marsh areas, then southeasterly, to the outlet (coming from the south) of Cramans, Theophile, Obatau and Glisy lakes;
- 2.0 kilometres (1.2 mi) easterly forming a northward loop to its mouth.

The confluence of the Marquette River West with the Marquette River is located at:

- 9.6 kilometres (6.0 mi) south-west of the mouth of the Marquette River (confluence with Ashuapmushuan Lake;
- 10.8 kilometres (6.7 mi) south-west of the mouth of Ashuapmushuan Lake located at the Canadian National Railway Bridge;
- 127.6 kilometres (79.3 mi) northwest of the mouth of the Ashuapmushuan River (confluence with Lac Saint-Jean);
- 168.2 kilometres (104.5 mi) west of the mouth of lac Saint-Jean (confluence with the Saguenay River).
The Marquette West River empties into a river bend on the west bank of the Marquette River. From there, the current flows along the Marquette River on the North-East to its confluence with the Ashuapmushuan Lake, which the current then flows through on 1.4 kilometres (0.87 mi) to the North; then the current flows along the Ashuapmushuan River which flows over the west shore of Lac Saint-Jean to Saint-Félicien, Quebec.

== Toponymy ==
This hydronym evokes the work of life of Jacques Marquette (Laon, France, 1637 - near Luddington, Michigan, 1675). He was a Jesuit missionary and explorer. He first studied Amerindian languages, then he devoted himself to various missions including the Outaouais; in 1671, he founded the mission of Saint-Ignace, among the Wendat (Hurons), on the north shore of Michilimakinac Strait. In 1672, he met Louis Jolliet with whom he would reach the Mississippi River. He will explore this river to the present border of Arkansas and Louisiana. Wanting to start a mission with the Kaskaskias in the land of Illinois, Father Marquette reluctantly relinquishes it because of illness.

The toponym "Rivière Marquette Ouest" was formalized on March 28, 1972, at the Commission de toponymie du Québec.

== See also ==
- Saguenay River
- Lac Saint-Jean, a body of water
- Ashuapmushuan River, a watercourse
- Ashuapmushuan Lake, a body of water
- Normandin River, a watercourse
- Marquette River, a watercourse
- Marquette Lake, a body of water
- Lac-Ashuapmushuan, Quebec, an unorganized territory
- Le Domaine-du-Roy, a Regional County Municipality (MRC)
- List of rivers of Quebec
