= Poutrincourt Lake =

Lake in Quebec, Canada

- Location within Quebec
- Location: Le Domaine-du-Roy (RCM)
- Coordinates: 49°09′19″N 74°05′46″W
- Type: Natural
- Primary inflows: (clockwise); Normandin River; Outlet of Sabbat Lake; outlet of lakes Arvert and Distré; outlet of lake Loustic; outlet of lakess Vésoul, Lacre and Drancy; outlet of lake Théze; outlet of lakes Kaki and Bevin; outlet of lake du Nid; outlet of lakes Salvia, Bacourt and Marle; outlet of lake Suisse; Du Milieu River (Normandin River); outlet of Émard lake; outlet of Boussière Lake.
- Primary outflows: Normandin River
- Basin countries: Canada
- Max. length: 19.7 kilometres (12.2 mi)
- Max. width: 6.7 kilometres (4.2 mi)
- Surface area: 56.45 kilometres (35.08 mi)
- Surface elevation: 392 metres (1,286 ft)

Poutrincourt Lake is a freshwater body of the unorganized territory of Lac-Ashuapmushuan, Quebec, in the western part of the Regional County Municipality (MRC) Le Domaine-du-Roy, in the administrative region of Saguenay-Lac-Saint-Jean, in province of Quebec, in Canada. This lake extends in the townships of Poutrincourt and Bouteroue. It is located west of the Ashuapmushuan Wildlife Reserve.

Forestry is the main economic activity of the sector. Recreational tourism activities come second.

The western part of the lake Poutrincourt hydrographic slope is accessible via the forest road R0223 (east–west direction) which passes to the north and a road branch on the east side of the lake. The forest road route 167 passes north-east of Nicabau Lake, connecting Chibougamau to Saint-Félicien, Quebec. The Canadian National Railway runs along this road.

The surface of Poutrincourt Lake is usually frozen from early November to mid-May, however, safe ice circulation is generally from mid-November to mid-April.

== Geography ==
Poutrincourt Lake is located at the western end of the MRC Le Domaine-du-Roy. This lake has a length of 19.7 kilometres (12.2 mi), a maximum width of 6.7 kilometres (4.2 mi) and an altitude of 392 metres (1,286 ft). The outline of the lake has a complex shape. This lake is a large widening of the Normandin River.

This lake has three parts of which the most important is the central part which has a few dozen islands. The bay stretches across 6.8 kilometres (4.2 mi) in parallel and on the west side of the central part of the lake. East Bay extends on 11.3 kilometres (7.0 mi) parallel to the central part of the lake. A long peninsula of 6.1 kilometres (3.8 mi) attached to the North shore (therefore facing South) separates it from the central part; while a peninsula of 2.1 kilometres (1.3 mi) stretches north. A small strait with a width of 0.2 kilometres (0.12 mi) separates the two ends of the peninsula.

The central portion of this lake receives the waters of the Normandin River on the west side and the Milieu River (Normandin River) in the south. The current of the Normandin River flows through lake Poutrincourt, passing 5.8 kilometres (3.6 mi); the current of the Middle River (Normandin River), 2.0 kilometres (1.2 mi).

The mouth of lake Poutrincourt is located at:

- 12.1 kilometres (7.5 mi) south of the mouth of Bouteroue Creek (confluence with the Normandin River);
- 17.6 kilometres (10.9 mi) south-east of the mouth of Rohault Lake;
- 14.9 kilometres (9.3 mi) south of the mouth of Nicabau Lake, which is crossed by the Normandin River;
- 24.6 kilometres (15.3 mi) west of the mouth of the Normandin River;
- 144 kilometres (89 mi) northwest of the mouth of the Ashuapmushuan River (confluence with lac Saint-Jean.

The main hydrographic slopes near lake Poutrincourt are:

- North side: Normandin River, Bouteroue Creek, Bouteroue Lake, Rohault Lake, Nicabau Lake, Obatogamau Lakes;
- East side: Marquette River West, Florimond Lake, Marquette River, Ashuapmushuan Lake;
- South side: Normandin River, Buade Lake (Normandin River), Milieu River (Normandin River), Palluay lake, Marquette River;
- West side: Finbar Lake, Feuquières Lake, Robert Lake (Opawica River), Queue de Castor River, Gabriel Lake (Opawica River), Ventadour River.

From the mouth of lake Poutrincourt, the current:

- 15.6 kilometres (9.7 mi) north forming a hook of 2.0 kilometres (1.2 mi) easterly to the south bay of Nicabau Lake;
- 5.3 kilometres (3.3 mi) either 1.8 kilometres (1.1 mi) northwards in the canton of Bouteroue, then eastwards in the canton of Ducharme) crossing the southern part of Nicabau Lake (altitude: 386 metres (1,266 ft)).
- From the mouth of Nicabau Lake, the current flows over the South-East, crossing Ducharme Lake, as far as Ashuapmushuan Lake, which constitutes the lake of head of the Ashuapmushuan River. This last river flows on the west shore of Lac Saint-Jean.

== Toponymy ==
Formerly, according to various sources, this body of water was designated "Lake Ascatiche", "Lake Ascatscie", "Lake Askatiche", "Lake Askitichi", "Lake Scatsi" or "Lake Skatsi".

The ancient appellations lake Ascatiche, Askitichi, Scatsie or Ascatsie, reported in the Dictionary of Rivers and Lakes of the Province of Quebec (1914 and 1925) are deformations of the Innu expression "oskat assi" meaning "new earth", "where the wood is green" or "small raw skin" according to the authors. The toponym “Poutrincourt”, which appears on a map of the region of Chibougamau in 1934, is borrowed from the name of the township where it is and honors the memory of Jean de Biencourt de Poutrincourt and Saint-Just (1557-1615), a character intimately linked to the beginning of the colonization of Acadie in the 17th century.

With Sieur de Monts, among others, he spent the winter of 1604–1605 on Sainte-Croix Island at the mouth of the river of the same name, on the border separating New Brunswick from the State of Maine. In 1606, Poutrincourt returned to Acadia as lieutenant governor of the fledgling colony. He made several other stays in Port-Royal, notably in 1607, in 1610 and in 1614.

The toponym "Lac Poutrincourt" was made official on December 5, 1968, by the Commission de toponymie du Québec, i.e. when this commission was created.

== See also ==
- Lac Saint-Jean, a body of water
- Ashuapmushuan River, a watercourse
- Normandin River, a watercourse
- Nicabau Lake, a body of water
- Du Milieu River (Normandin River), a watercourse
- Le Domaine-du-Roy, a regional county municipality (MRC)
- Lac-Ashuapmushuan, Quebec, an unorganized territory
- List of lakes in Canada
