= Rohault Lake =

Lake in Quebec, Canada

- Location within Quebec
- Location: Eeyou Istchee James Bay Regional Government
- Coordinates: 49°22′12″N 74°21′08″W
- Type: Natural
- Primary inflows: Outlet of Mannard Lake, outlet of lakes Argoub and Ovale, outlet of lake Artémis, outlet of lakes Cri-Cri and “De la Hutte”, outlet of Djebel Lake, outlet of Hérépian Lake, outlet of Véria Lake, outlet of Tooke Lake, outlet of lakes Laplume and Audon.
- Primary outflows: Bouteroue Lake
- Basin countries: Canada
- Max. length: 16.3 kilometres (10.1 mi)
- Max. width: 5.6 kilometres (3.5 mi)
- Surface elevation: 402 metres (1,319 ft)

Rohault Lake is a freshwater body of the unorganized territory of Lac-Ashuapmushuan, Quebec, in the western part of Le Domaine-du-Roy, in the administrative region of Saguenay-Lac-Saint-Jean, in province of Quebec, in Canada. This lake extends into the townships of Rohault, Robert and Ducharme (near the mouth).

Forestry is the main economic activity of the sector. Recreational tourism activities come second.

The western part of the Lake Rohault hydrographic slope is accessible via the R1032 forest road (North-South direction). The forest road route 167 passes north-east of Nicabau Lake, connecting Chibougamau to Saint-Félicien, Québec. The Canadian National Railway runs along this road. The northern part of lake Rohault is served by the forest road serving the Nemenjiche River.

The surface of lake Rohault is usually frozen from early November to mid-May, however, safe ice circulation is generally from mid-November to mid-April.

== Geography ==
Lake Rohault and Poutrincourt Lake constitute the most important water bodies of the zone of the higher part of the Normandin River which is a tributary of the Ashuapmushuan River that empties into Lac Saint-Jean. It is located at the western end of the MRC Le Domaine-du-Roy. This lake has a length of 16.3 kilometres (10.1 mi), a maximum width of 5.6 kilometres (3.5 mi) and an altitude of 402 metres (1,319 ft). The outline of the lake has a complex shape.

Lake Rohault has a peninsula attached to the north shore and extending over 8.3 kilometres (5.2 mi) towards the center of the lake. This lake has about a hundred islands, the largest of which lies on the North 5.9 kilometres (3.7 mi) side along the west shore of the lake. A strip of land stretching northward on 11.3 kilometres (7.0 mi) distinguishes Lake Rohault and Lake Bouteroue (located on the east side). On the east side, Gaudreau Bay extends northward for 11.6 kilometres (7.2 mi). The current flows through this bay to the mouth of the lake at the bottom of another bay on the east side.

The mouth of Lake Rohault is located at:

- 8.5 kilometres (5.3 mi) north-west of the mouth of the Bouteroue Lake;
- 10.2 kilometres (6.3 mi) northwest of the mouth of Bouteroue Creek (confluence with the Normandin River);
- 19.7 kilometres (12.2 mi) northwest of the mouth of Poutrincourt Lake;
- 38.1 kilometres (23.7 mi) northwest of the mouth of Ashuapmushuan Lake;
- 160.6 kilometres (99.8 mi) south-west of the mouth of the Ashuapmushuan River (confluence with lac Saint-Jean).

The main hydrographic slopes near Lake Rohault are:

- North side: Mannard Lake, Nemenjiche River, La Dauversière Lake, Énard River, Chibougamau Lake;
- East side: Bouteroue Lake, Normandin River, Bouteroue Creek, Nicabau Lake;
- South side: Robert Lake (Opawica River), Feuquières Lake, Finbar Lake, Ventadour River, Titipiti River, Pierrefonds River;
- West side: Nemenjiche Lake, Opawica River, Gabriel Lake (Opawica River), Surprise Lake (Roy River), Cawcot River.

From the road bridge at the mouth of Rohault Lake, the current:

- crosses the Bouteroue Lake on the South 10.4 kilometres (6.5 mi) to its mouth;
- crosses south-east, then north-east, on an unidentified lake to the dam at its mouth;
- descend Bouteroue Creek on 7.0 kilometres (4.3 mi) to a bay south of Nicabau Lake, the southern portion of which is crossed by the Normandin River;
Note: The Normandin River flows southeast to Ashuapmushuan Lake which is the head lake of the Ashuapmushuan River.

== Toponymy ==
The toponym "Lac Rohault" was formalized on December 5, 1968, by the Commission de toponymie du Quebec.

== See also ==
- Lac Saint-Jean, a body of water
- Ashuapmushuan River, a watercourse
- Normandin River, a watercourse
- Nicabau Lake, a body of water
- Bouteroue Creek, a watercourse
- Bouteroue Lake, a body of water
- Le Domaine-du-Roy (RCM)
- Lac-Ashuapmushuan, Quebec, an unorganized territory
- List of lakes in Canada
