= Tonnerre River =

Tonnerre River (Thunder River) may refer to:

- Tonnerre River (Minganie), a river in the Côte-Nord region of Quebec, Canada
- Tonnerre River (Normandin River), a tributary of the Normandin River, in Le Domaine-du-Roy, Quebec, Canada
