= Nicabau Lake =

- Location within Quebec
- Location: Le Domaine-du-Roy (RCM)
- Coordinates: 49°22′25″N 74°07′46″W
- Type: Lake of dam
- Primary inflows: (clockwise); outlet of Nobert Lake; outlet of Veillet Lake; Boisvert River (Normandin River); Coquille River; outlet of a set of lakes such as Michaud, Vallet, Pavie and “de la Combine”.
- Primary outflows: Normandin River
- Basin countries: Canada
- Max. length: 9.7 kilometres (6.0 mi)
- Max. width: 3.0 kilometres (1.9 mi)
- Surface area: 14.85 kilometres (9.23 mi)
- Surface elevation: 386 metres (1,266 ft)

Nicabau Lake is a freshwater body of the unorganized territory of Lac-Ashuapmushuan, Quebec, in the western part of Regional County Municipality (MRC) Le Domaine-du-Roy, in the Saguenay-Lac-Saint-Jean administrative region, in the province of Quebec, in Canada.

This lake is located mainly in the canton of Ducharme, except the bay of the South which is located in the canton of Bouterque. This lake is marked the western boundary of the Ashuapmushuan Wildlife Reserve.

Forestry is the main economic activity of the sector. Recreational tourism activities come second.

The forest road route 167 passes on the east side of Nicabau Lake, connecting Chibougamau to Saint-Félicien, Quebec. The Canadian National Railway runs along route 167. The Nicabau railway stop served the area.

The surface of Nicabau Lake is usually frozen from early November to mid-May, however, safe ice movement is generally from mid-November to mid-April.

== Geography ==
Lake Nicabau is located at the western end of the MRC Le Domaine-du-Roy. This lake has a length of 9.7 kilometres (6.0 mi), a maximum width of 3.0 kilometres (1.9 mi) and an altitude of 386 metres (1,266 ft). The Normandin River crosses on 5.3 kilometres (3.3 mi) (including 1.8 kilometres (1.1 mi) to North in "canton de Bouteroue", then to East in "canton de Ducharme") the southern part of Lake Nicabau.

The mouth of Lake Nicabau is located at:

- 2.2 kilometres (1.4 mi) south of the Canadian National Railway;
- 0.4 kilometres (0.25 mi) south-west of the confluence of the Du Tonnerre River (Normandin River);
- 26.4 kilometres (16.4 mi) northwest of the confluence of the Normandin River with Ashuapmushuan Lake;
- 15.0 kilometres (9.3 mi) North of the mouth of Poutrincourt Lake;
- 12.7 kilometres (7.9 mi) north-east of a curve of the Eeyou Istchee James Bay (municipality) boundary;
- 147 kilometres (91 mi) northwest of the mouth of the Ashuapmushuan River (confluence with lac Saint-Jean.

The main hydrographic slopes near Lake Nicabau are:

- North side: Boisvert River (Normandin River), Coquille River (Normandin River), Chibougamau Lake, Armitage River;
- East side: Poutrincourt Lake, Du Milieu River (Poutrincourt Lake), Marquette River West, Marquette River, Ashuapmushuan Lake;
- South side: Normandin River, Chaudière River (Normandin River), Ashuapmushuan River, La Loche River;
- West side: Rohault Lake, Nemenjiche River, Nemenjiche Lake, Opawica River.
From the mouth of lake Nicabau, the current flows over 39.6 kilometres (24.6 mi) to the south-east, in particular by crossing Ducharme Lake, until Ashuapmushuan Lake which is the head lake of the Ashuapmushuan River. This last river flows on the west shore of Lac Saint-Jean.

== Toponymy ==
Of Innu origin, the toponymic spelling of this body of water has varied often since the days of New France, including: Nekouba, Nekoubau, Nicoupao, Necoubeau, Nikaubau or Nikabau. Nikabau would mean "lake surrounded by hay".

In the past, the lake was a crossroad for travelers on major waterways (particularly the Normandin River, particularly those leading from Tadoussac or Trois-Rivières to Trois-Rivières. Hudson Bay]] In 1661, the Jesuit fathers Dablon and Druillettes reached the place they identify as Nekouba, describing it as a famous place because of a fair that is held there In the years when all the native people from the area go shopping, a 1661 map showing the missionaries' trip mentions the name of Nekouba, and the names "Nekoubou River" and "Nek8pas Lake" are indicated on 1672 maps respectively. 1680. Guillaume Delisle indicates on his map of 1703: "Necouba (post office)" and "R. de Necoub" The Jesuit Laure will use the gentile "Nekubauists" on his "Map of the Domaine du Roy in Canada" of 1732.

The toponym "lac Nicabau" was formalized on December 5, 1968, by the Commission de toponymie du Québec.

== See also ==
- Saguenay River
- Lac Saint-Jean, a body of water
- Ashuapmushuan River, a watercourse
- Ashuapmushuan Lake, a body of water
- Normandin River, a watercourse
- Boisvert River (Normandin River tributary), a watercourse
- Coquille River (Normandin River tributary), a watercourse
- Le Domaine-du-Roy, a regional county municipality (MRC)
- Lac-Ashuapmushuan, Quebec, an unorganized territory
- Ashuapmushuan Wildlife Reserve, a protected territory
- List of lakes in Canada
