= Ashuapmushuan Wildlife Reserve =

Wildlife reserve in Quebec, Canada

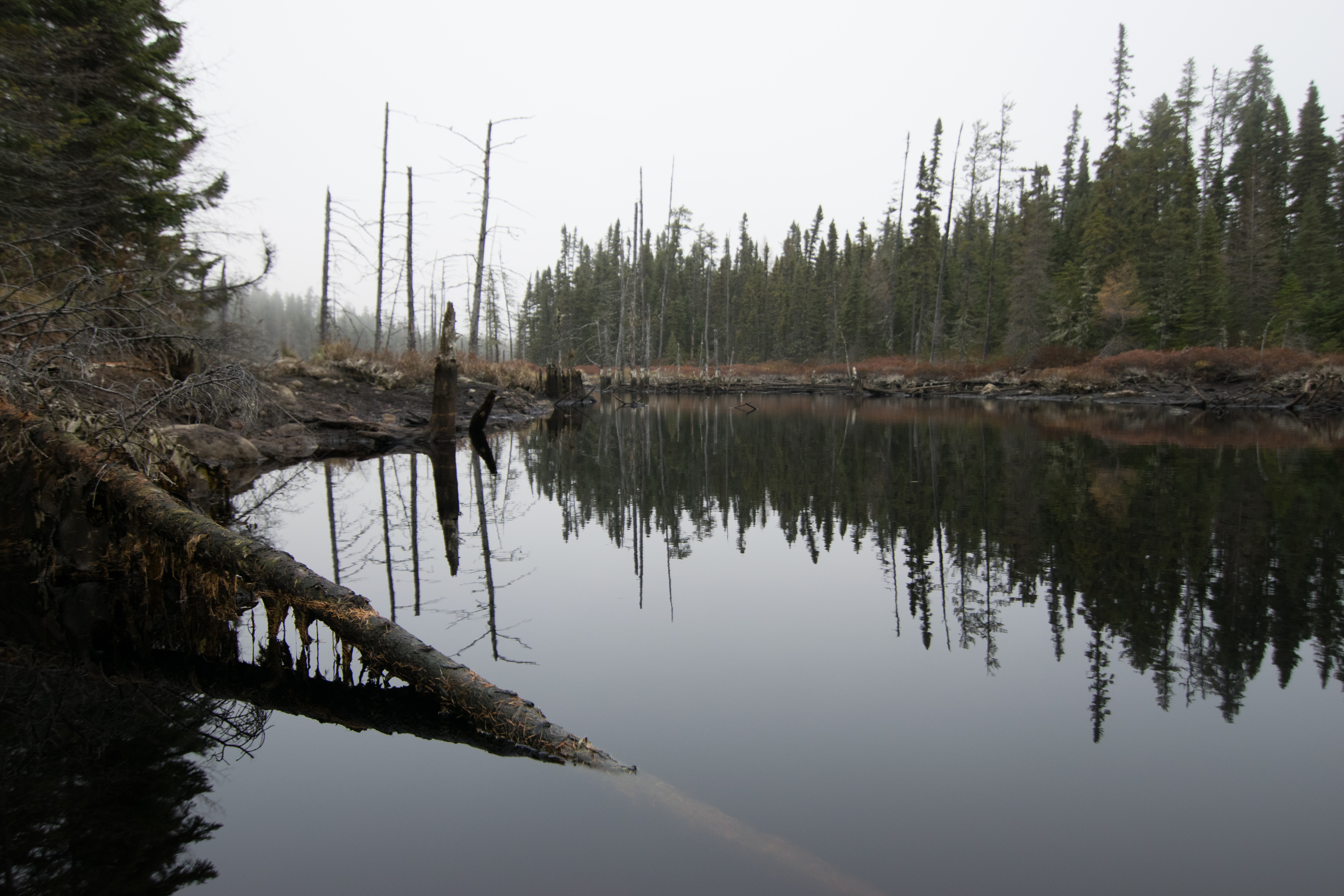
- Interactive map of Ashuapmushuan Wildlife Reserve
- Location: Lac-Ashuapmushuan, Quebec, Canada
- Nearest city: Saint-Félicien, La Doré, Chibougamau
- Coordinates: 49°05′N 73°32′W
- Area: 4,488 km^{2} (1,733 sq mi)
- Governing body: Sépaq and Ministry of Natural Resources and Wildlife
- Website: www.sepaq.com/rf/ash/

The Ashuapmushuan Wildlife Reserve is a wildlife reserve in Quebec, Canada, in the watershed of the Ashuapmushuan River. It is mainly located in the region of Saguenay-Lac-Saint-Jean, between the municipality of La Doré and the city of Chibougamau, and covers an area of 4,488 square kilometres (1,733 sq mi).

This area was first visited by "Montagnais" Innu people who practiced the fur trade. With the arrival of Europeans in the area, several trading posts, called Postes du Roi, were established on the shores of lakes Ashuapmushuan and Nicabau. The word Ashuapmushuan is a term in Montagnais Innu language, meaning "where we see the moose".

== Access ==
Ashuapmushuan Wildlife Sanctuary is located in the Saguenay-Lac-Saint-Jean Region between La Doré and Chibougamau, 325 kilometres (202 mi) north of Quebec City. It is crossed by the Route 167. This road provides access to the host South station and host Chigoubiche position, respectively located at km 33 and 113.

== Territory ==
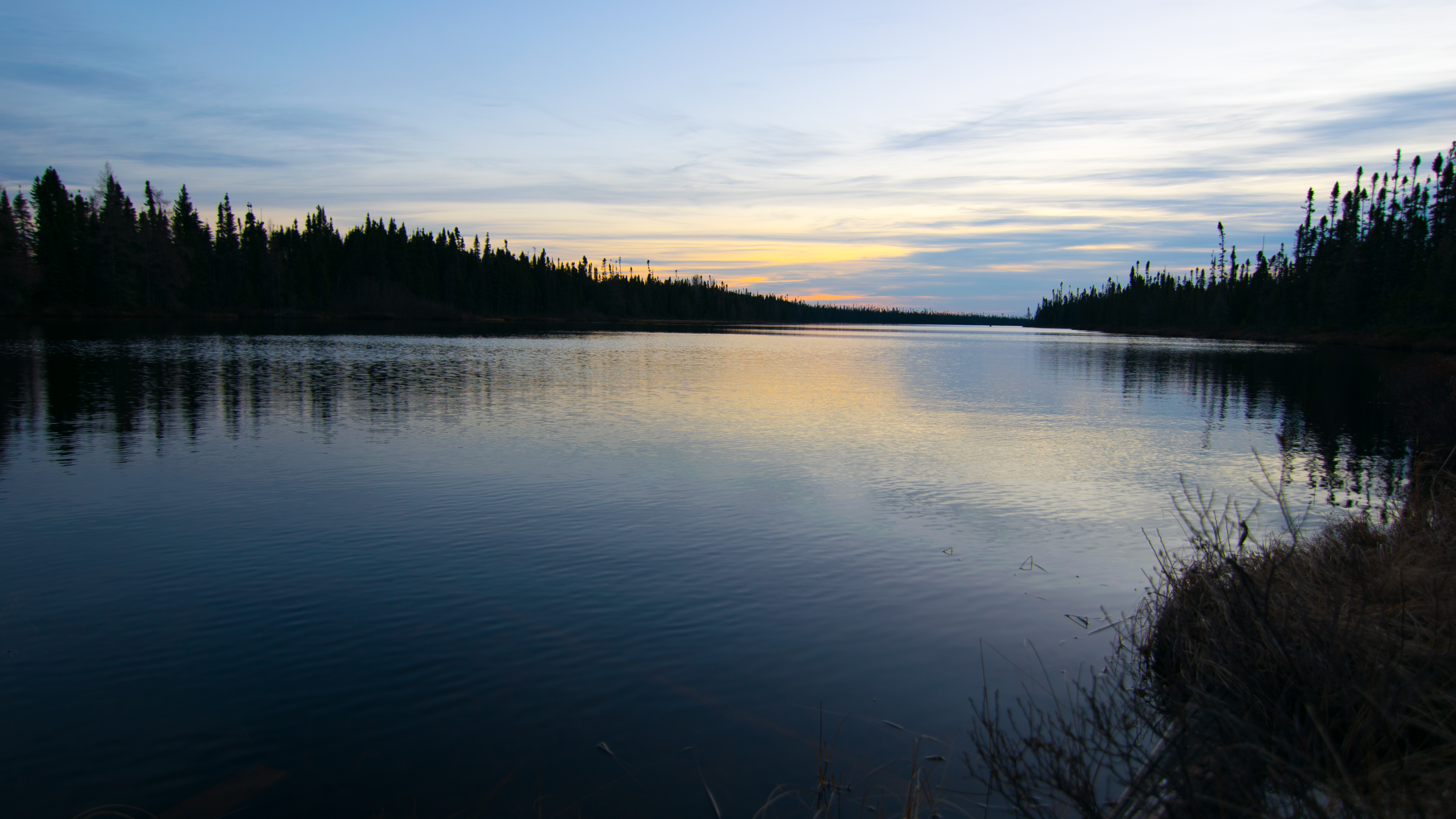
Lake Perron in Ashuapmushuan Wildlife Reserve

The area of the reserve is 4,487 square kilometres (1,732 sq mi). The territory is covered in the south by a pine forest with hardwood which gradually converts to a forest of black spruce and jack pine to the north. It contains some 1200 lakes and numerous streams and rivers.

The forest industry operates in Ashuapmushuan Wildlife Reserve under supply and forest management agreements (CAAF) granted by the Ministry of Natural Resources.

== Activities and facilities ==
In this Wildlife Reserve, eleven cottages located on the shore of Lake Chigoubiche to end rental boaters. Some of these cabins can accommodate two to three people and in the same area, seven cottages are fully equipped to accommodate four to six people. Moreover, the rest area Draveurs, at kilometre 48, has four rustic chalets equipped with a more basic equipment.

On the edge of Lake Dufferin, located a little further south, there is a single cottage for 6 people. Closer Quebec Route 167, an old building caretaker is available for groups up to 8 people. All the cottages are equipped with Wildlife propane equipment. The water is not potable throughout the reserve. Wildlife Reserve makes available to vacationers rowboats and kayaks.

The reserve welcomes numerous fishermen every summer, especially for walleye, northern pike, and brook trout, but also lake trout and lake whitefish. Hunting packages for black bear, moose, and small game (spruce grouse, ruffed grouse, and showshoe hare) are also available.

== See also ==
- List of protected areas of Quebec
- Société des établissements de plein air du Québec (Sépaq)
- List of Canadian provincial parks
