= Ashuapmushuan Lake =

Lake in Lac-Ashuapmushuan, Quebec, Canada

- Location within Quebec
- Location: Le Domaine-du-Roy (RCM)
- Coordinates: 49°09′35″N 73°45′12″W
- Type: Natural
- Primary inflows: (clockwise); Normandin River; outlet of a set of lakes such Yvette, de l'Arrachis, Érato, des Cassides and Idéal; Licorne River; outlet of a set of lakes such Guignard, Antailla and Nicole; outlet of a set of lakes such Salien, Avuagour, Braque, Noignie, de la Portée and de la Dépression; outlet of lake de la Tranchée, outlet of a set of lakes such Laon, Flers and Morey; outlet of lakes Braille and Bluteau; Marquette River; outlet of Coincé Lake.
- Primary outflows: Ashuapmushuan River
- Basin countries: Canada
- Max. length: 13.4 kilometres (8.3 mi)
- Max. width: 2.4 kilometres (1.5 mi)
- Surface area: 28.17 kilometres (17.50 mi)
- Surface elevation: 371 metres (1,217 ft)

Ashuapmushuan Lake is a freshwater body in the Lac-Ashuapmushuan unorganized territory of the Le Domaine-du-Roy Regional County Municipality, north-west in Saguenay-Lac-Saint-Jean administrative region, in the province of Quebec, Canada.

This lake is fully within the geographic township of Lorne and the Ashuapmushuan Wildlife Reserve.

Forestry is the main economic activity of the sector. Recreational tourism activities come second.

The forest road Route 167 linking Chibougamau and Saint-Félicien, Quebec passes to the northeast of the lake, as well as the Canadian National Railway. Other secondary forest roads serve the vicinity of the lake.

On the peninsula at the northwestern end of the lake, at the confluence of the Marquette River, Normandin River, and Ashuapmushuan River, a trading post was built in the early eighteenth century. It has been in operation for several decades.

== Toponymy ==
In the Ilnue language, ashuapmushuan means "where moose are being watched". Since the late nineteenth century, a dozen different spellings of the name of this body of water has been noted, whose form "Lac Chamouchouan" noted on a map of 1897.

The toponym "Lac Ashuapmushuan" was formalized on October 5, 1982, by the Commission de toponymie du Québec.

== History ==
In 1685, French fur traders set up a trading post near Lake Ashuapmushuan that remained almost continuously in operation until the middle of the 19th century. It successively came under control of the Traite de Tadoussac (French period), King's Posts (English period), followed by the North West Company in 1802, that obtained a 20-year lease of the posts in the King's Domain. By 1808, it was considered as "the poorest and shabbiest" post. When the North West Company (NWC) and the Hudson's Bay Company (HBC) merged in 1821, it was operated by the HBC for one year until the original NWC lease expired.

In 1831, the HBC reacquired the rights to the King's Posts and operated the Ashuapmuchuan Post (also known as Moar's Post or Showapam shon) until 1850, when it was abandoned as a result of settlement pressures and decline in trade with indigenous people. Sometime before 1884 the post was reopened but was reduced to a winter post in 1886. The post closed permanently circa 1938.

== Geography ==
This lake has a length of 13.4 kilometres (8.3 mi) oriented north-west, a maximum width of 2.4 kilometres (1.5 mi) and an altitude of 371 metres (1,217 ft). Towards the center of the lake, a first bay stretches over 0.8 kilometres (0.50 mi) to the east; a second stretches southward on 1.6 kilometres (0.99 mi). In addition, a third bay stretches 0.5 metres (1 ft 8 in) northeasterly from its southern tip to the mouth of the Licorne River.

The surface of Ashuapmushuan Lake is usually frozen from early November to mid-May, however, safe ice movement is generally from mid-November to mid-April.

The mouth of Lake Ashuapmushuan is located at:

- 8.8 kilometres (5.5 mi) southwesterly of the route 167;
- 12.3 kilometres (7.6 mi) south of the mouth of the Hilarion River (confluence with the Ashuapmushuan River);
- 122.4 kilometres (76.1 mi) northwest of the mouth of the Ashuapmushuan River (confluence with lac Saint-Jean);
- 160.7 kilometres (99.9 mi) east of the mouth of lac Saint-Jean (confluence with the Saguenay River);
- 292 kilometres (181 mi) east of the mouth of the Saguenay River (confluence with the Estuary of Saint Lawrence.

The main hydrographic slopes near Lake Ashuapmushuan are:

- North side: Aigremont Lake, Denaut Lake, Ashuapmushuan River, La Loche River;
- East side: Chiboubiche Lake, Licorne River, Ashuapmushuan River, Chigoubiche River;
- South side: Arlequin Creek, Marquette River, Laon Lake;
- West side: Marquette River West, Poutrincourt Lake, Normandin River.

From the mouth of Ashuapmushuan Lake, the current of the Ashuapmushuan River flows northward on 35.9 kilometres (22.3 mi), then 144 kilometres (89 mi) south-east to its confluence with lac Saint-Jean where it empties onto the west shore.

== See also ==
- List of lakes of Quebec
