= Ashuapmushuan River =

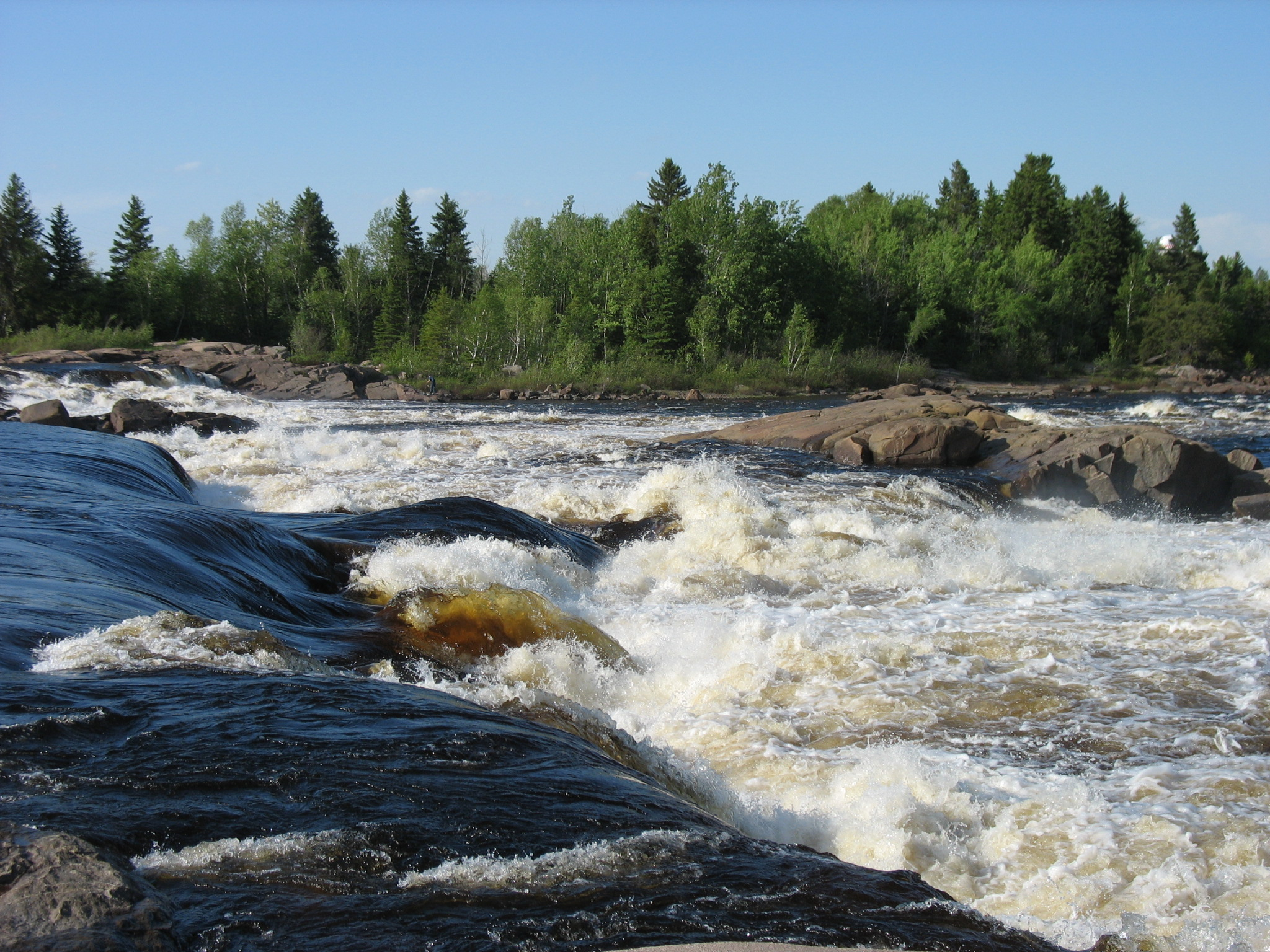
- Michel Falls at Saint-Félicien

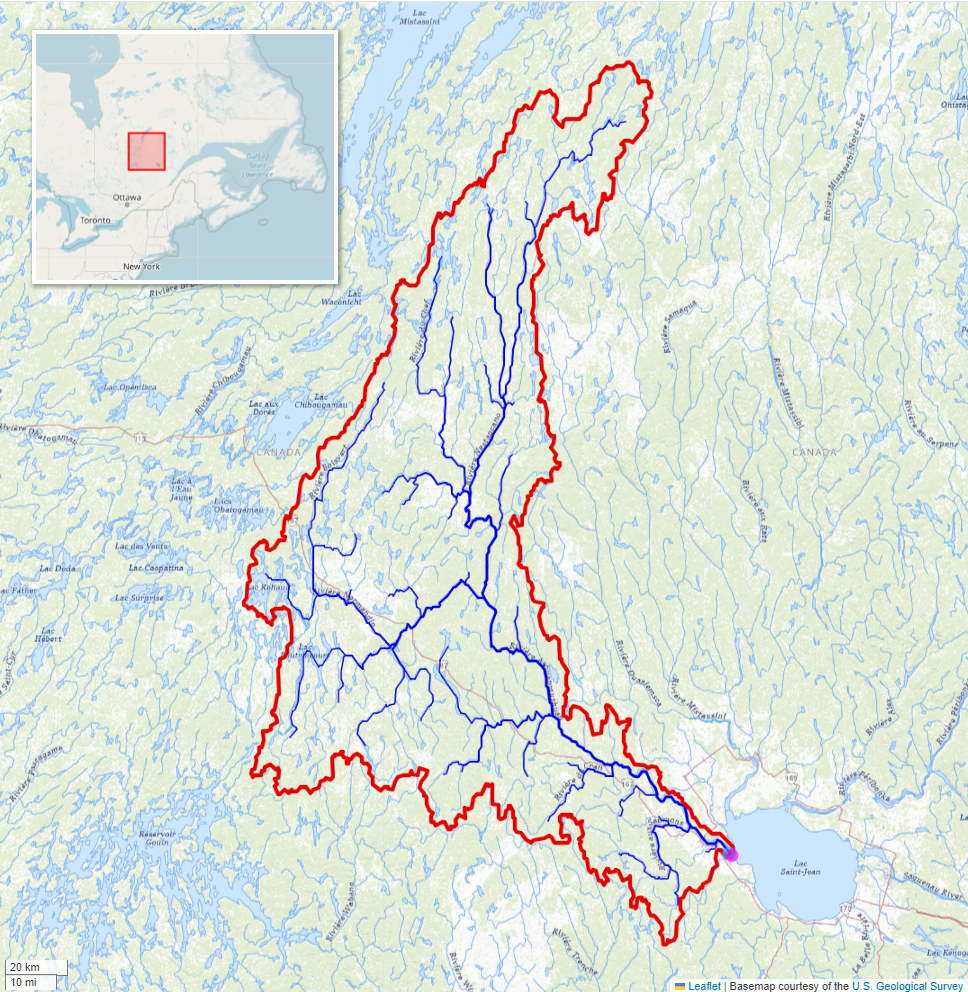
- Ashuapmushuan River basin map

Location
- Country: Canada
- Province: Quebec
- Region: Saguenay–Lac-Saint-Jean

Physical characteristics
- Source: Lake Ashuapmushuan
  - location: Lac-Ashuapmushuan Unorg. Terr.
  - coordinates: 49°13′50″N 73°45′15″W
  - elevation: 360 m (1,180 ft)
- Mouth: Lac Saint-Jean
  - location: Pointe-Saint-Méthode (Saint-Félicien)
  - coordinates: 48°37′03″N 72°20′00″W
  - elevation: 100 m (330 ft)
- Length: 181 km (112 mi)
- Basin size: 15,746 km^{2} (6,080 sq mi)
- Discharge
  - location: Chute aux Saumons
  - average: 298 m^{3}/s (10,500 cu ft/s)
  - minimum: 75 m^{3}/s (2,600 cu ft/s)March
  - maximum: 1,050 m^{3}/s (37,000 cu ft/s)May

Basin features
- Tributaries
  - left: (Upstream); rivière à la Loutre; Petite rivière aux Saumons; discharge of Perron lake; Moncou Creek; discharge of a set of lake; rivière aux Brochets; discharge of a set of lakes such as Porc-Épic lake; Desaultels Creek; rivière Du Chef; Mazarin River; discharge of some lakes such as Rougear and Perineau; La Loche River.
  - right: (Upstream); rivière à l'Ours; Petite rivière Eusèbe; rivière aux Saumons; Pémonca River; rivière du Cran; discharge of Lac du Cran; discharge of Lac de la Savane; Chigoubiche River; Kanishushteu River; discharge of a set of lakes such as Lac du Carvi and lake Lantenay; discharge of lakes Drôle, Grillon and en Dentelle; discharge of a set of lakes such as Birau, Lerner and Soyer; discharge of lakes Morange and Pigeau; discharge of lake Camille; discharge of lake Siligny; discharge of lakes Angely and Dutiné; discharge of lake Lévesque.

The Ashuapmushuan River is a river in the Saguenay–Lac-Saint-Jean region of the Canadian provinces of Quebec. It starts at the outlet of Lake Ashuapmushuan, and flows first in a north-easterly direction for about 30 kilometres (19 mi) whereafter it continues south-east to Saint-Félicien. There it drains into Lac Saint-Jean of which it is the third largest tributary after the Peribonka and Mistassini Rivers. The river is 181 kilometres (112 mi) long but its source is 266 kilometres (165 mi) from its mouth.

Typical median summer flow is between 200 and 300 cubic metres per second (7,100 and 10,600 cu ft/s), whereas during spring run-off, the median flow is 1,050 cubic metres per second (37,000 cu ft/s), but the river could swell anywhere from 400 to 2,400 cubic metres per second (14,000 to 85,000 cu ft/s). Lowest flow conditions occur in March with a median flow of 75 cubic metres per second (2,600 cu ft/s) and a minimum of 54 cubic metres per second (1,900 cu ft/s) to a maximum of 120 cubic metres per second (4,200 cu ft/s).

The Ashuapmushuan River forms the northern boundary of the Ashuapmushuan Wildlife Reserve for most of its length. As a wild undeveloped river, and accessible from Quebec Route 167 close to Lake Ashuapmushuan, it is a popular destination for canoe camping.

A new 276.6-square-kilometre (106.8 mi^{2}) aquatic reserve is being considered that would protect 126 kilometres (78 mi) of the Ashuapmushuan River, including its floodplain and valley slopes. The reserve prohibits logging, mining, and hydro-electric development, while protecting critical landlocked salmon habitats, biodiversity, and sites of archaeological interest.

== Etymology ==
The name Ashuapmushuan, which was not officially adopted until 1982, is an Innu word meaning "place where one lies in wait for moose".

The river was however first called Necouba by Louis Jolliet in 1679. This name was also used by Jean-Baptiste-Louis Franquelin and Guillaume Delisle in 1686 and 1703 respectively. But in 1732 surveyor Normandin considered this an error, who referred to the Necoubeau as a tributary to Lake Ashuapmushuan that was called Lake Chomonchouane by Laure on his maps of 1731 and 1732. Therefore, Normandin renamed the river to Chomontchouane. In 1917, the Commission de géographie officially adopted the modernized spelling of Chamouchouane.

== Geography ==
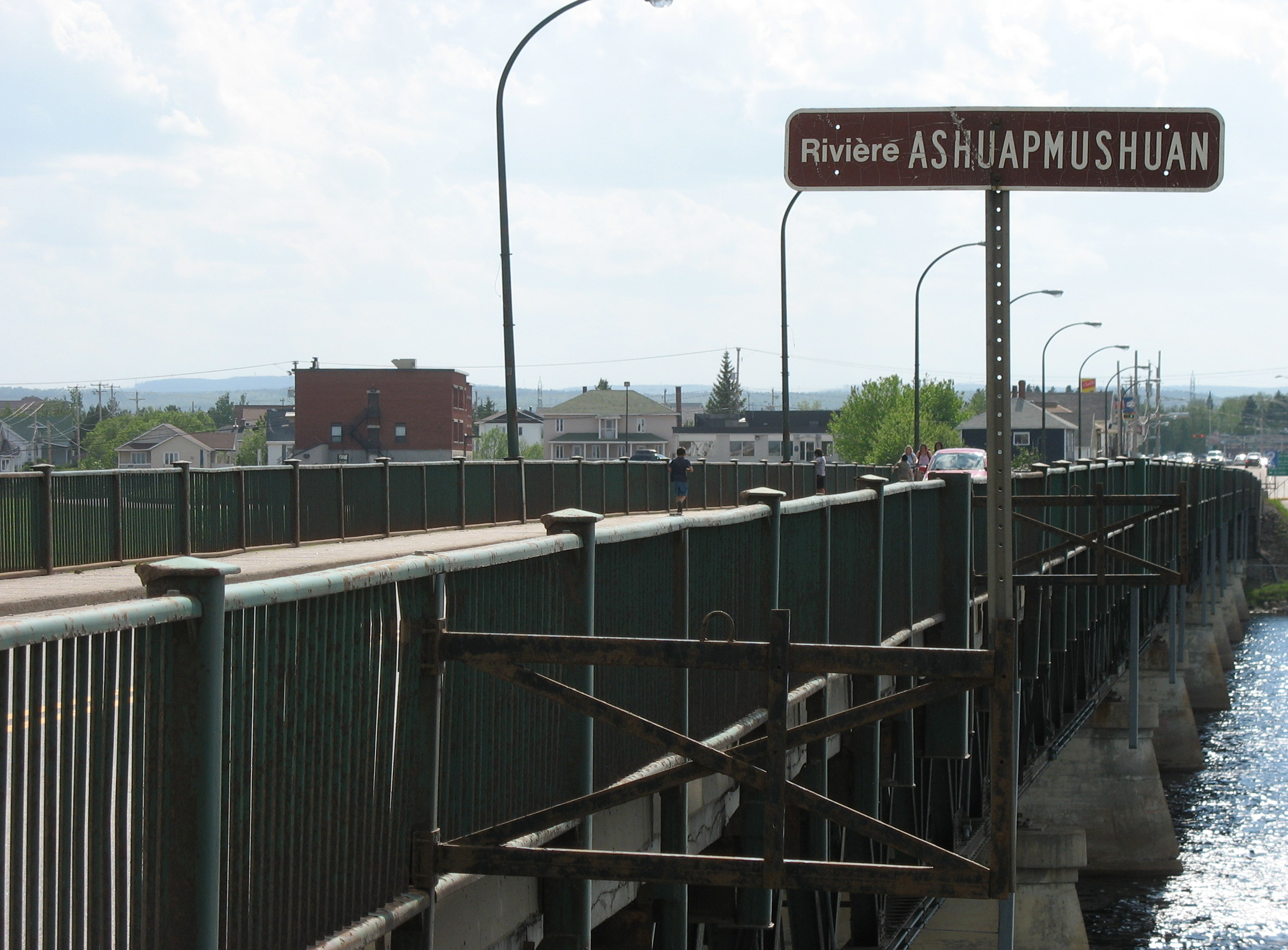
L'ancien pont Carbonneau (route 169) spanned the Ashuapmushuan river near Saint-Félicien. A new bridge was recently built.

The Ashuapmushuan basin is part of the Central Laurentians in the natural region of the Lake Manouane Depression. The river is enclosed in narrow valleys for a large part of its course, with powerful rapids and a dozen waterfalls, of which the most impressive are the Chaudière Falls.

From the mouth of Ashuapmushuan Lake, the course of the Ashuapmushuan river flows over 130.6 km (81.2 mi), with a drop of 268 m (879 ft), according to the following segments:

Upper course of the Ashuapmushuan river (segment of 45.2 km (28.1 mi); difference in height of 59 m (194 ft))

- 15.4 km (9.6 mi) northwards crossing Lake Denaut on 4.2 km (2.6 mi) (length: 5.7 km (3.5 mi); altitude: 369 m (1,211 ft)), bending towards the north-east, bypassing an island before passing under the road bridge, to the la Loche river (coming from the north-west);
- 21.3 km (13.2 mi) north-east to a bend in the river; then east, to the Mazarin River (coming from the north);
- 8.5 km (5.3 mi) south-east, up to the confluence of the Du Chef River (coming from the north);

Intermediate course of the Ashuapmushuan river (upstream of the Chef river) (segment of 42.8 km (26.6 mi); difference in height of 50 m (160 ft))

- 5.0 km (3.1 mi) southeasterly, up to a bend in the river, corresponding to the outlet (coming from the north) of Desautels stream;
- 12.5 km (7.8 mi) southeasterly in a straight line, up to a bend corresponding to the outlet (coming from the south) of several lakes including Lac en Dentelle and Lac Charles-Lacroix;
- 12.5 km (7.8 mi) towards the east by forming three large curves towards the north, until the confluence of the rivière aux Brochets (coming from east);
- 7.5 km (4.7 mi) eastwards, to the confluence of the Kanishushteu River (coming from the west);
- 5.3 km (3.3 mi) towards the east, then turning towards the south-east in a deep valley, until the confluence of the Chigoubiche River (coming from the west);

Intermediate course of the Ashuapmushuan river (upstream of the Chigoubiche river) (segment of 50 km (31 mi); drop in height of 91 m (299 ft))

- 2.9 km (1.8 mi) eastwards, up to a bend corresponding to the outlet of lakes André, Larouaque and Guillemet;
- 14.2 km (8.8 mi) first towards the south by crossing a series of rapids, then the Chutes de la Chaudière; then turning southeast in a deep valley, to a bend in the river, then east (slightly to the south) almost in a straight line, collecting the outlet (coming from the south) from Lac de la Savane, to the confluence of the Moncou stream (coming from the north);
- 10.7 km (6.6 mi) crossing the White Spruce Rapids, collecting the Petite rivière aux Saumons (coming from the north-west), collecting the outlet of Lac du Cran, until at the Cran river (coming from the south);
- 22.2 km (13.8 mi) first towards the east by forming a hook towards the north, in particular by collecting the Rivière à la Loutre (coming from the northwest) and crossing the Rapides Plats; then a large loop to the north where the river bypass the island of the Notary (length: 2.3 km (1.4 mi)), to turn southeast, until the confluence of the Pémonca river (coming from South West);

Lower Ashuapmushuan River (segment of 37.6 km (23.4 mi); difference in height of 68 m (223 ft))

- 13.1 km (8.1 mi) first by forming a loop towards the south-east by crossing two series of rapids going up towards the north; then forming a big M where the current crosses the Little Bear Falls, then the Big Bear Falls, up to a bend in the river;
- 7.3 km (4.5 mi) south-east, bypassing Adhémar Island, until the confluence of the Salmon river (coming from the west);
- 6.4 km (4.0 mi) towards the south-east by crossing the Michel waterfall, passing under the railway bridge, crossing two series of rapids, up to the Carbonneau bridge which connects downtown Saint-Félicien at the north shore;
- 10.8 km (6.7 mi) towards the east by collecting the Petite rivière Eusèbe (coming from the west), by forming a curve towards the south while passing in front of the town of Saint-Félicien (located on the south side) and in front of the Saint-Félicien airfield (located on the north side), bypassing a group of islands including Hudon Island (length: 1.2 km (0.75 mi), as well as collecting the rivière à l'Ours; then forming another curve going north on 1.5 m (4 ft 11 in), where the river bypasses Michelangelo Island (length: 1.1 km (0.68 mi)) and Île Sauvage, forming a gulf, gradually widens over 3.3 km (2.1 mi), up to reach a width of 1.6 km (0.99 mi) at the height of Pointe Sainte-Method (located on the north shore), to its mouth.

The river finally flows into Lac Saint-Jean a few kilometers downstream from Saint-Félicien, near Saint-Prime. The river finally flows into Lac Saint-Jean a few kilometers downstream from Saint-Félicien, near Saint-Prime. From the mouth of the Ashuapmushuan river, the current crosses Lac Saint-Jean east on 41.1 km (25.5 mi) (its full length), follows the course of the Saguenay River via the Petite Décharge on 172.3 km (107.1 mi) east to Tadoussac where it merges with the Estuary of Saint Lawrence.

Municipal territories crossed by the river

Starting from the upstream (Ashuapmushuan Lake), the course of the Ashuapmushuan river descends, crossing the following municipal territories:

Left bank	Right Bank
Lac-Ashuapmushuan	Lac-Ashuapmushuan
La Doré	Rivière-Mistassini
Saint-Félicien	Saint-Thomas-Didyme
Saint-Prime	Normandin
	Saint-Félicien

From the confluence of the Du Chef River and the Saint-Félicien limit, the course of the Ashuapmushuan river turns out to be the limit between the Maria-Chapdelaine Regional County Municipality (side north of the river) and Le Domaine-du-Roy Regional County Municipality (south side).

== History ==
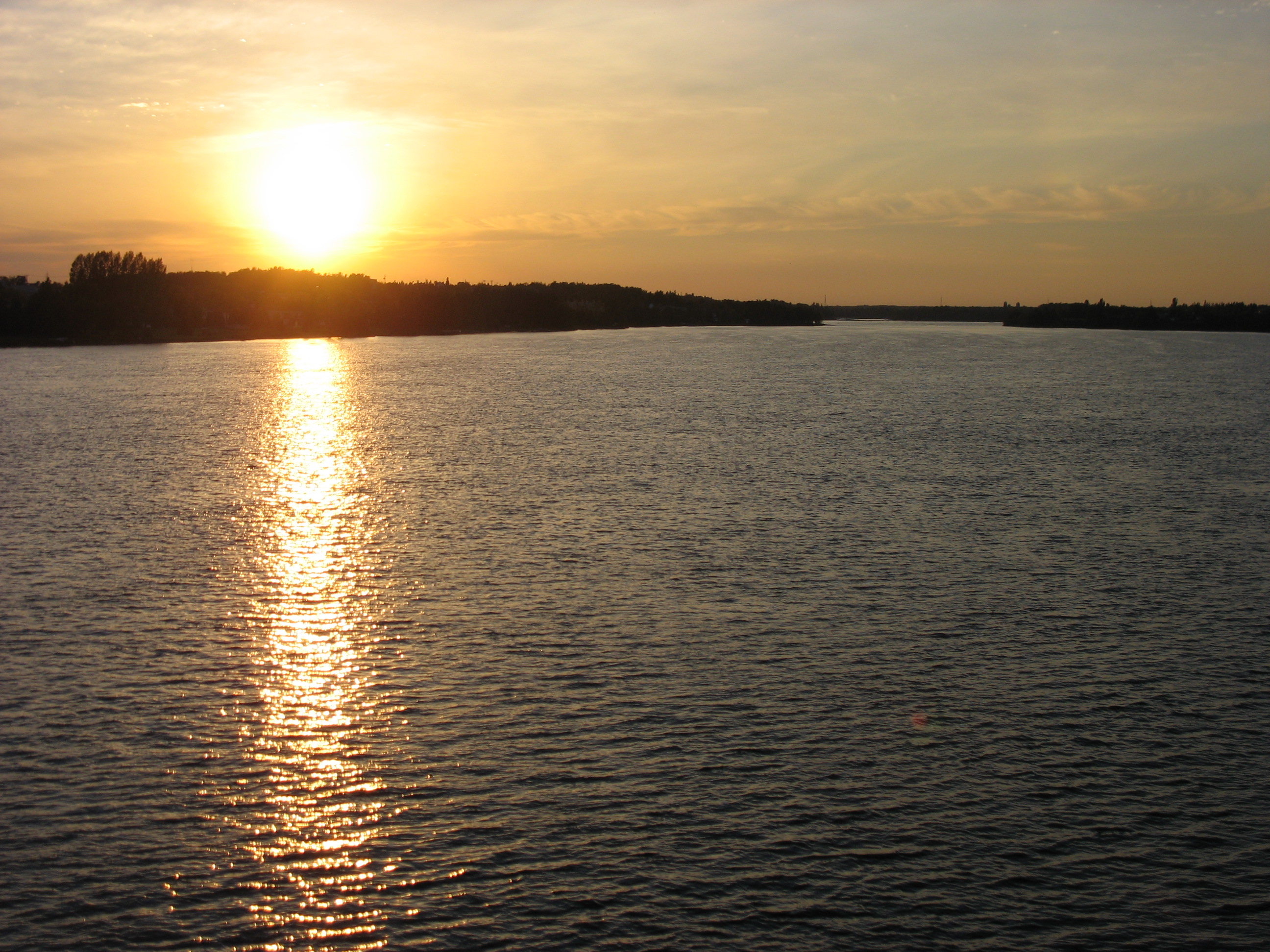
Sunset over the Ashuapmushuan River at Saint-Félicien

The Ashuapmushuan River Basin is home to several archaeological sites that show that indigenous people occupied the area for thousands of years. European explorers and missionaries came in the 17th century. For instance, Charles Albanel used the river for his voyage to Hudson Bay in 1672.

In 1685, French fur traders set up a trading post on the eastern shore of Lake Ashuapmushuan that remained almost continuously in operation until the middle of the 19th century. It successively came under control of the Traite de Tadoussac (French period), King's Posts (English period), the North West Company (1802), and the Hudson's Bay Company (1821). During this period, the river became a major link in the fur trade route from Tadoussac to Hudson Bay since its source is just east of Lake Mistassini on the Rupert River. The vestiges of the post are considered some of the most valuable and best preserved relics from the era.

After the fur trade, the Ashuapmushuan River was used by logging companies to drive logs downstream.

== Fauna ==
The Ashuapmushuan River and its tributaries provide spawning grounds and habitats for landlocked salmon (Salmo salar ouananiche). Newly hatched salmon remain in the river for 2 to 4 years before migrating to Lake Saint-Jean where it remains for most of its adult life. Then, at age 4 to 8, it will return to the river to spawn. While the Ashuapmushuan River has significantly contributed to salmon production for the lake, the salmon population has seen a sharp decline in the 1990s. Despite conservation measures, its status remains of concern.
