= Quebec Route 167 =

Highway in Quebec, Canada

Route 167

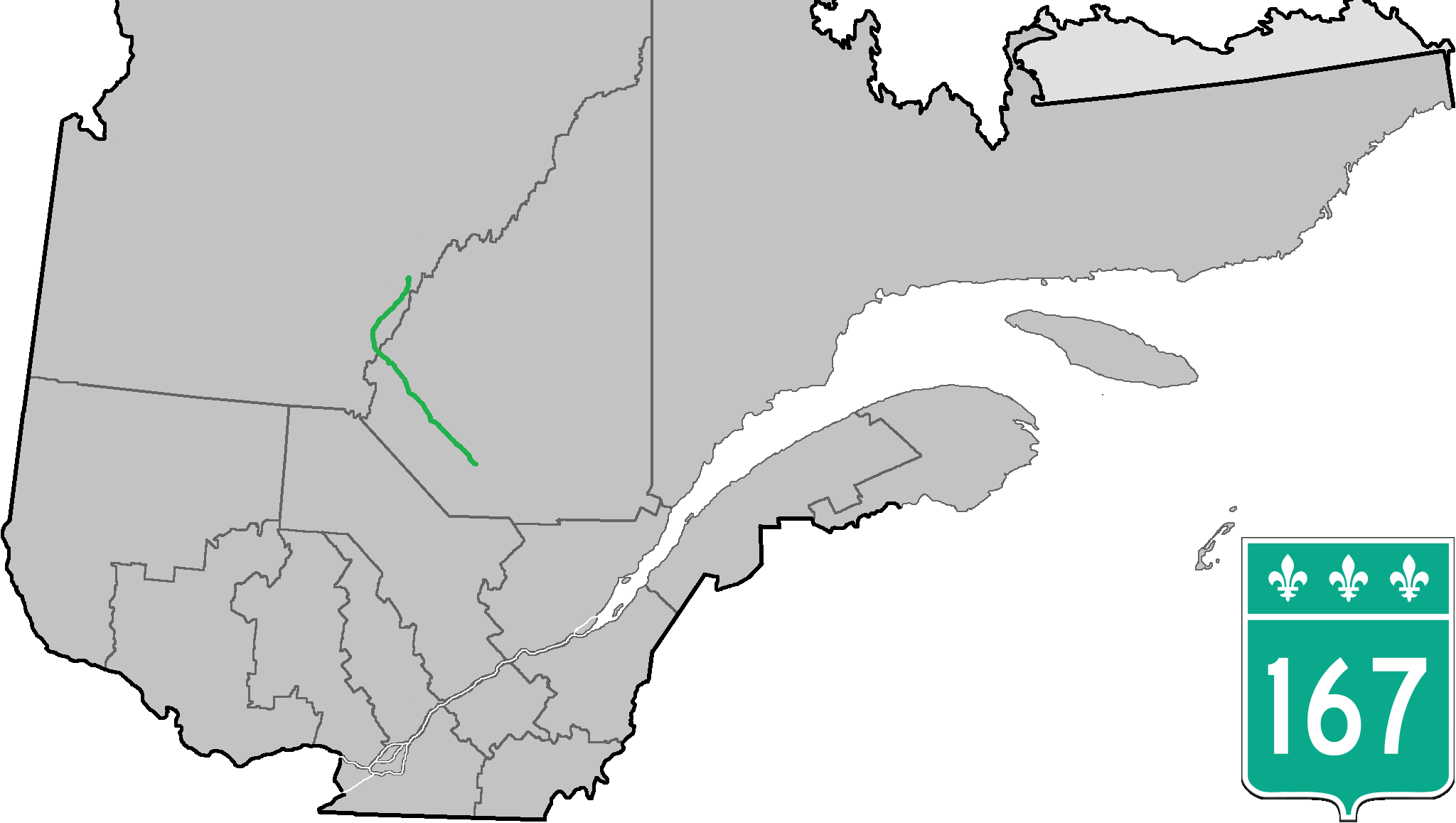

Route information
- Maintained by Transports Québec
- Length: 650.8 km (404.4 mi)

Major junctions
- South end: R-169 in Saint-Félicien
- R-113 in Chibougamau
- North end: Lac-Albanel

Location
- Country: Canada
- Province: Quebec
- Major cities: Saint-Félicien, Chibougamau, Mistissini

Highway system
- Quebec provincial highways; Autoroutes; List; Former
← R-165	→ R-169

Route 167 is an isolated provincial highway in Quebec, Canada. It begins at the shore of Lac Saint-Jean in Saint-Félicien. It proceeds north-west to Chibougamau 232 km (144.2 mi) away. The only services along this long stretch are at La Doré and Chibougamau. At Chibougamau, the highway turns north-east towards Mistissini.

Maps are conflicting about the northernmost extent of this highway. The latest provincial road map shows the highway ending 16 km (9.9 mi) south of Mistissini, while the pavement does continue to the town itself. According to Ministère des transports publication "Distances routières", the route continues up as far as Lac-Albanel, east of Lac Mistassini.

== Municipalities along Route 167 ==
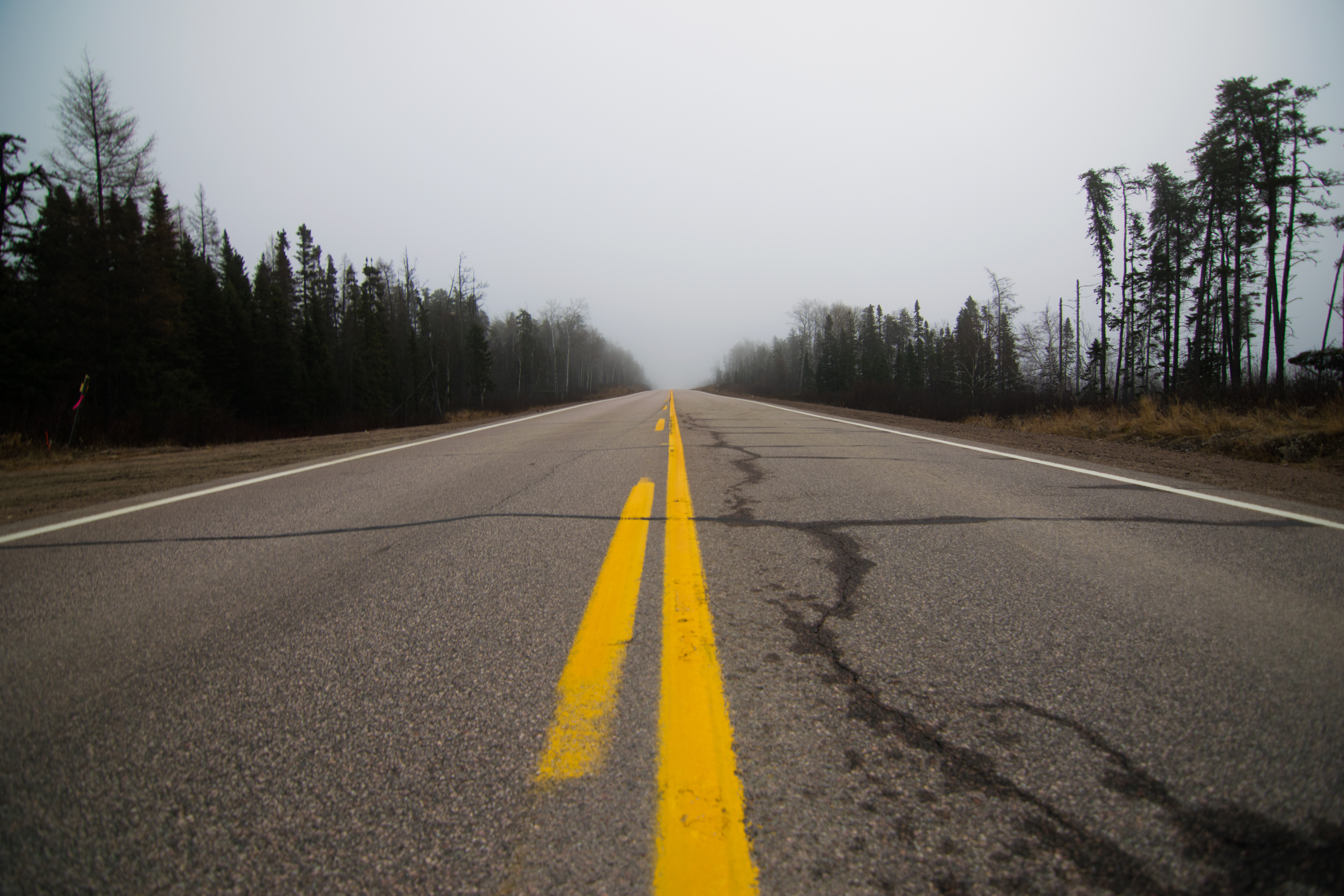
Quebec Route 167 in Ashuapmushuan Wildlife Reserve

- Saint-Félicien
- La Doré
- Lac-Ashuapmushuan
- Eeyou-Istchee-Baie-James
- Chibougamau
- Mistissini

== Extension ==
The Quebec Department of Transportation has proposed to extend Route 167 North, in the direction of the Otish Mountains, approximately 250 km to the northeast of Albanel Lake.

Construction began in February 2012. The 240 km extension to the Stornoway Renard Mine was completed in 2014.

The first deliveries of liquified natural gas, by truck, with the new road were made in June 2016 to the Renard Mine.

In 2020 a Memorandum of Understanding was signed between the James Bay Cree Nation of Eeyou Istchee and the Government of Québec. The MOU sets a roadmap for infrastructure development. Phase II of the Infrastructure program includes Extension of Route 167 to the north to connect with the Trans-Taiga Road, over an approximate distance of 125 km.

== See also ==
- List of Quebec provincial highways
