= Saint-Félicien, Quebec =

Saint-Félicien
- City
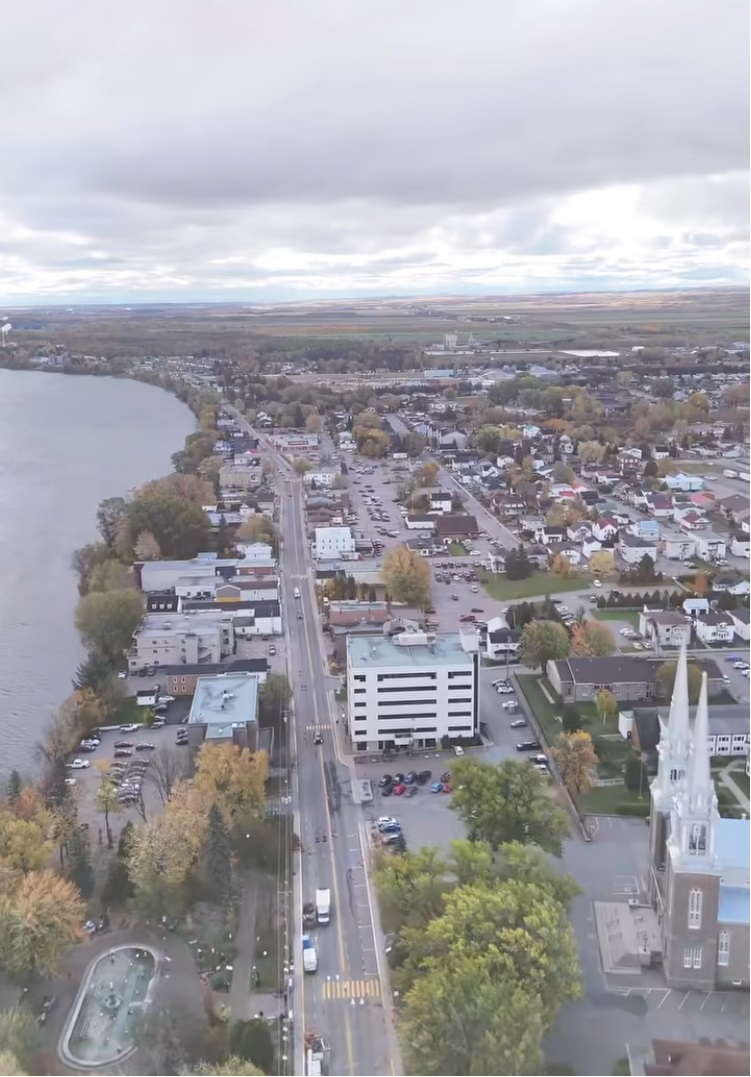
- Aerial view of Saint-Félicien

- Coat of arms

- Location in Saguenay–Lac-Saint-Jean Quebec
- Coordinates: 48°39′N 72°27′W
- Country: Canada
- Province: Quebec
- Region: Saguenay–Lac-Saint-Jean
- RCM: Le Domaine-du-Roy
- Settled: 1864
- Constituted: June 12, 1996

Government
  - Mayor: Jean-Philippe Boutin
  - Federal riding: Lac-Saint-Jean
  - Prov. riding: Roberval

Area
  - City: 383.60 km^{2} (148.11 sq mi)
  - Land: 361.27 km^{2} (139.49 sq mi)
  - Urban: 8.58 km^{2} (3.31 sq mi)

Population (2021)
  - City: 10,089
  - Density: 27.9/km^{2} (72/sq mi)
  - Urban: 6,751
  - Urban density: 786.6/km^{2} (2,037/sq mi)
  - Pop (2016-21): ▼1.5%
  - Dwellings: 5,169
- Time zone: UTC−5 (EST)
  - Summer (DST): UTC−4 (EDT)
- Postal code(s): G8K
- Area codes: 418 and 581
- Highways: R-167; R-169; R-373
- Website: ville.stfelicien.qc.ca

Saint-Félicien (French pronunciation: [sɛ̃ felisjɛ̃]) is a city in the Canadian province of Quebec. The town is located within the Le Domaine-du-Roy Regional County Municipality in the Saguenay-Lac-Saint-Jean region. Its population as of 2021 is 10,089.

== History ==
The town was founded in 1864 when the first settlers from Charlevoix and Chicoutimi arrived. It became a municipality in 1882 and the parish was established in 1884 before becoming a city in 1976 after a merger. Agriculture and saw wood were the predominant economic activities across the region in addition to hunting, fishing and dairy. The railroad started to serve the area in 1917. Wood pulp became a major contributor in the local economy starting in the 1970s.

In 1971, the Cégep de Saint-Félicien opened in the city. It continues to be the primary college for the city and neighbouring towns such as Normandin and Dolbeau-Mistassini. It is the only college in Québec that offers classes in forestry.

In 1996, the municipality of Saint-Methode was merged with Saint-Felicien as part of a municipal re-organization in the area.

== Geography ==
The municipality is located on the western shores of Lac Saint-Jean north of Roberval, near the mouth of the Ashuapmushuan River. It is accessible from Chibougamau and northern Quebec via Quebec Route 167 and from locations around the lake and elsewhere across central and southern Quebec via Quebec Route 169.

== Demographics ==
In the 2021 Census of Population conducted by Statistics Canada, Saint-Félicien had a population of 10,089 living in 4,686 of its 5,169 total private dwellings, a change of −1.5% from its 2016 population of 10,238. With a land area of 361.27 km^{2} (139.49 sq mi), it had a population density of 27.9/km^{2} (72.3/sq mi) in 2021.

In 2021, the median age was 48.4, as opposed to 41.6 for all of Canada. French was the mother tongue of 98.5% of residents in 2021. The next most common mother tongues were English, Haitian Creole, and Spanish, all at 0.3%. 0.4% reported both English and French as their first language.

As of 2021, Indigenous peoples comprised 5.0% of the population, most of whom were First Nations, and visible minorities contributed 1.6%. The largest visible minority groups in Saint-Félicien are Black (0.8%), Southeast Asian (0.3%), and Latin American (0.3%).

In 2021, 74.0% of the population identified as Catholic, a 20.7% decrease from 2011, while 17.3% said they had no religious affiliation. Jehovah's Witnesses were the largest religious minority, making up 1.3% of the population.

Counting both single and multiple responses, the most commonly identified ethnocultural ancestries were:

Ethnic origin	2021
Canadian	39.5%
French	21.4%
Québécois	16.3%
French Canadian	11.2%
First Nations	3.5%
Innu	1.4%
Irish	1.4%
German	1.0%
Scottish	1.0%

(Percentages may total more than 100% due to rounding and multiple responses).

Population trend:

- Population in 2021: 10,089 (2016 to 2021 population change: -1.5%)
- Population in 2016: 10,238
- Population in 2011: 10,278
- Population in 2006: 10,477
- Population in 2001: 10,622
- Population in 1996: 9,599
- Population in 1991: 9,340
- Population in 1986: 9,324
- Population in 1981: 9,058
- Population in 1976: 4,985
- Population in 1971: 4,952
- Population in 1966: 5,104
- Population in 1961: 5,133
- Population in 1956: 4,152
- Population in 1951: 2,656
- Population in 1941: 1,603
- Population in 1931: 1,599
- Population in 1921: 1,306
- Population in 1911: 581

== Attractions ==
The main attraction of the municipality is the 485-acre (1.96 km^{2}) wildlife zoo founded in 1960. The attraction contains about 80 different species including the polar bear, Arctic fox, Canada goose, snowy owl, Canada lynx, American black bear, grizzly bear, bighorn sheep, mountain goat, American bison and the black-tailed prairie dog. Until 1994, the zoo contained various exotic animals but today it contains almost exclusively species native to the boreal climate. In the last years, the zoo acquired animal species living in boreal climate from all around the world, such as: Siberian tiger, Japanese macaque, red-crowned crane and the Bactrian camel.

== See also ==
- Saguenay–Lac-Saint-Jean
- Le Domaine-du-Roy Regional County Municipality
- Ashuapmushuan River
- Petite rivière Eusèbe
- Rivière à la Carpe (Petite rivière Eusèbe)
- Rivière à l'Ours (Ashuapmushuan River)
- Petite rivière à l'Ours (rivière à l'Ours) - West
- Zoo sauvage de Saint-Félicien
- Autodrome St-Félicien
- List of towns in Quebec
