= Lac-Ashuapmushuan, Quebec =

Lac-Ashuapmushuan
- Unorganized territory
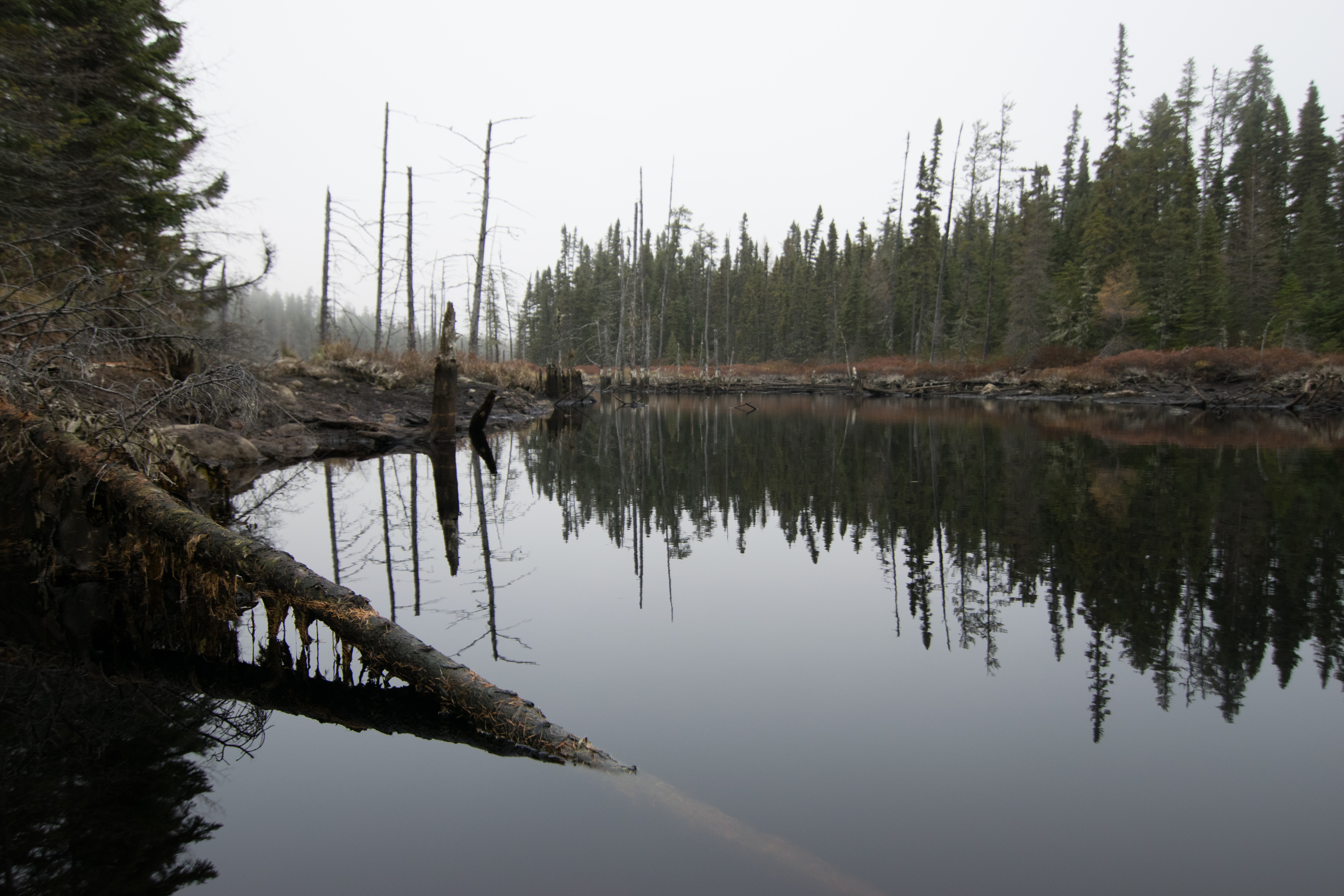

- Location in Saguenay–Lac-Saint-Jean Quebec
- Coordinates: 49°10′N 73°45′W
- Country: Canada
- Province: Quebec
- Region: Saguenay–Lac-Saint-Jean
- RCM: Le Domaine-du-Roy
- Constituted: January 1, 1986

Government
  - Federal riding: Lac-Saint-Jean
  - Prov. riding: Roberval

Area
  - Total: 15,853.46 km^{2} (6,121.06 sq mi)
  - Land: 14,684.28 km^{2} (5,669.63 sq mi)

Population (2021)
  - Total: 41
  - Density: 0/km^{2} (0/sq mi)
  - Pop (2016–21): ▲13.9%
  - Dwellings: 571
- Time zone: UTC-5 (EST)
  - Summer (DST): UTC−4 (EDT)
- Area codes: 418 and 581

Lac-Ashuapmushuan is an unorganized territory in the Canadian province of Quebec, Canada, located in the regional county municipality of Le Domaine-du-Roy. The region had a population of 41 as of the 2021 Canadian census, and covered a land area of 14,684.28 square kilometres (5,669.63 sq mi). It is home to the Ashuapmushuan Wildlife Reserve.

The eponymous Ashuapmushuan Lake is roughly in the centre of the territory. This lake, about 14 kilometres (8.7 mi) long by 2.3 kilometres (1.4 mi) wide, is the source of the Ashuapmushuan River. Its name is of Innu origin, meaning "place where one lies in wait for moose".

In 1685, French fur traders set up a trading post near Lake Ashuapmushuan that remained almost continuously in operation until the middle of the 19th century. It successively came under control of the Traite de Tadoussac (French period), King's Posts (English period), the North West Company (1802), and the Hudson's Bay Company (1821).

Quebec Route 167 goes through the territory, but there are no services or fuel available for its entire length.

== Etymology ==
The Ashuapmushuan Wildlife Reserve and the unorganized territory of Lac-Ashuapmushuan take their name from the Ashuapmushuan River. This river flows into Lake Saint-Jean and was frequently traveled by fur traders at the time of the New France and also the English regime, in order to make commercial treaties, especially human trafficking fur. This river was a preferred axis to connect in canoes between Lac Saint-Jean and James Bay. This area is renowned for hunting and fishing.

== Demographics ==
Historical census populations – Lac-Ashuapmushuan, Quebec

Year	Pop.	±%
1991	3	—
1996	0	−100.0%
2001	0	0.00%
2006	35	—

Year	Pop.	±%
2011	28	−20.0%
2016	36	+28.6%
2021	41	+13.9%

2021 Population figure based on revised count.
Source: Statistics Canada

Private dwellings occupied by usual residents (2021): 23 (total dwellings: 571)

== See also ==
- List of unorganized territories in Quebec
- Rivers in Lac-Ashuapmushuan:
  - Rivière à l'Ours (Ashuapmushuan River)
  - Ovide River
  - Petite rivière à l'Ours (rivière à l'Ours) - West
  - Petite rivière Eusèbe
  - Rivière à la Carpe (Petite rivière Eusèbe)
  - Deuxième bras des Iroquois
