= Le Domaine-du-Roy Regional County Municipality =

Le Domaine-du-Roy
- Regional county municipality
- Coordinates: 48°29′N 72°21′W
- Country: Canada
- Province: Quebec
- Region: Saguenay–Lac-Saint-Jean
- Effective: January 1, 1983
- County seat: Roberval

Government
  - Type: Prefecture
  - Prefect: Yanick Baillargeon

Area
  - Total: 18,713.70 km^{2} (7,225.40 sq mi)
  - Land: 17,803.47 km^{2} (6,873.96 sq mi)

Population (2016)
  - Total: 31,285
  - Density: 1.8/km^{2} (4.7/sq mi)
  - Change (2011–16): ▼1.8%
  - Dwellings: 16,549
- Time zone: UTC−5 (EST)
  - Summer (DST): UTC−4 (EDT)
- Area codes: 418 and 581
- Website: www.domaineduroy.ca

Le Domaine-du-Roy (French pronunciation: [lə dɔmɛn dy ʁwa], lit. 'The King's Domain') is a regional county municipality in the Saguenay-Lac-Saint-Jean region of Quebec, Canada. Its seat is in Roberval, and it is named for the King of France, who owned the land at the time of the colonization of Quebec.

== Subdivisions ==
There are 10 subdivisions within the RCM:

Cities & Towns (2)

- Roberval
- Saint-Félicien

Municipalities (5)

- Chambord
- Lac-Bouchette
- Sainte-Hedwidge
- Saint-François-de-Sales
- Saint-Prime

Parishes (1)

- La Doré

Villages (1)

- Saint-André-du-Lac-Saint-Jean

Unorganized Territory (1)

- Lac-Ashuapmushuan

Indian Reserve (1)
(not associated with RCM)

- Mashteuiatsh

== Demographics ==
=== Population ===
Canada census – Le Domaine-du-Roy community profile

	2021	2016	2011
Population	31,095 (-0.6% from 2016)	31,285 (-1.8% from 2011)	31,870 (-0.3% from 2006)
Land area	17,476.45 km^{2} (6,747.70 sq mi)	17,803.47 km^{2} (6,873.96 sq mi)	17,799.45 km^{2} (6,872.41 sq mi)
Population density	1.8/km^{2} (4.7/sq mi)	1.8/km^{2} (4.7/sq mi)	1.8/km^{2} (4.7/sq mi)
Median age	50.4 (M: 49.2, F: 51.2)	48.2 (M: 47.3, F: 49.1)	46.4 (M: 45.9, F: 46.9)
Private dwellings	16,921 (total) 14,281 (occupied)	16,549 (total)	17,494 (total)
Median household income	$65,000	$54,587	$46,848

References: 2021 2016 2011

Historical Census Data - Le Domaine-du-Roy Regional County Municipality, Quebec

Year	Pop.	±%
1991	33,239	—
1996	33,860	+1.9%
2001	32,839	−3.0%

Year	Pop.	±%
2006	31,956	−2.7%
2011	31,870	−0.3%
2016	31,285	−1.8%

=== Language ===
Canada Census Mother Tongue - Le Domaine-du-Roy Regional County Municipality, Quebec
Census	Total	French			English			French & English			Other		
Year	Responses	Count	Trend	Pop %	Count	Trend	Pop %	Count	Trend	Pop %	Count	Trend	Pop %
2016	30,715	30,090	▼2.5%	97.97%	100	0.0%	0.33%	55	▲10.0%	0.16%	470	▲42.4%	1.05%
2011	31,345	30,865	▲0.5%	98.47%	100	▼9.1%	0.32%	50	▼23.1%	0.16%	330	▼37.1%	1.05%
2006	31,415	30,715	▼2.5%	97.77%	110	▼12.0%	0.35%	65	▲333.3%	0.21%	525	▲5.0%	1.67%
2001	32,155	31,515	▼3.3%	98.01%	125	▲31.6%	0.39%	15	▼81.3%	0.05%	500	▲21.0%	1.55%
1996	33,160	32,590	n/a	98.28%	95	n/a	0.29%	80	n/a	0.24%	395	n/a	1.19%

== Transportation ==
=== Access routes ===
Highways and numbered routes that run through the municipality, including external routes that start or finish at the county border:

Autoroutes

- None

Principal Highways

- R-155
- R-167
- R-169

Secondary Highways

- None

External Routes

- None

== See also ==
- List of regional county municipalities and equivalent territories in Quebec
