= Waposite Lake =

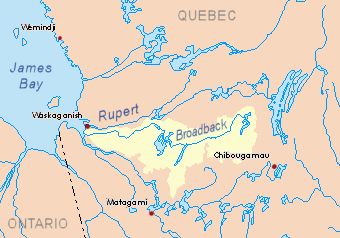
- Watershed of Broadback River

- Location within Quebec
- Location: Eeyou Istchee James Bay Regional Government
- Coordinates: 50°15′40″N 75°14′27″W
- Type: Natural
- Primary inflows: Outlet of “Trois Îles Lake”
- Primary outflows: Comencho Lake
- Basin countries: Canada
- Max. length: 16.0 kilometres (9.9 mi)
- Max. width: 6.2 kilometres (3.9 mi)
- Surface elevation: 361 metres (1,184 ft)

Waposite Lake is a body of water in the Broadback River watershed in the Eeyou Istchee James Bay (municipality) area in the Nord-du-Québec, in the province of Quebec, in Canada. This lake is part of the territory of Assinica Wildlife Sanctuary and Turgis Township.

Forestry is the main economic activity of the sector. Recreational tourism activities come second.

The nearest forest road is located at 35.6 kilometres (22.1 mi) south-east of the lake, the road skirting Mount Opémisca from the north; this road joins towards the south the route 113 (connecting Lebel-sur-Quévillon and Chibougamau) and the Canadian National Railway.

The surface of Waposite Lake is usually frozen from early November to mid-May, however, safe ice movement is generally from mid-November to mid-April.

== Geography ==
Waposite Lake has a length of 16.0 kilometres (9.9 mi), a maximum width of 6.2 kilometres (3.9 mi) and an altitude of 361 metres (1,184 ft).

Waposite Lake has four parts:

- western part: receiving from the north-east the waters of Cachisca Lake which includes a dam at its mouth and whose main bodies of water upstream are Dumas Lake, Opataca Lake;
- central part: with several islands;
- West part: Square (with rounded corners), it extends over 3.2 kilometres (2.0 mi) to a peninsula (length: 1.8 kilometres (1.1 mi)) attached to the North shore which separates it to the East of the following part. This part has eight islands;
- Center-West part: length: 4.1 kilometres (2.5 mi); Center-East part: dimension: 6.2 kilometres (3.9 mi) (North-South direction) by 4.0 kilometres (2.5 mi). This part receives on the South side two unidentified lake dumps: eastern part: dimension: 5.2 kilometres (3.2 mi) (North-South direction) by 4.1 kilometres (2.5 mi). This part receives from the South side the discharge of four lakes including the "Lake of the Three Islands". A peninsula stretching eastward on the 2.0 kilometres (1.2 mi) separates the "Three Islands Lake" and the Waposite Lake.

The mouth of Waposite Lake is located at:

- 19.3 kilometres (12.0 mi) south-east of the mouth of Comencho Lake;
- 32.7 kilometres (20.3 mi) south-east of the mouth of Assinica Lake;
- 57.8 kilometres (35.9 mi) south-east of the mouth of the Assinica River (confluence with the Broadback River;
- 149.4 kilometres (92.8 mi) east of the mouth of Evans Lake;
- 290.2 kilometres (180.3 mi) east of the mouth of the Broadback River (confluence with Rupert Bay);
- 66.6 kilometres (41.4 mi) north-west of downtown Chibougamau;
- 58.5 kilometres (36.4 mi) north-west of the village center of Chapais, Quebec]

The main hydrographic slopes adjacent to Waposite Lake are:

- North side: Comencho Lake, Assinica Lake, Assinica River, Broadback River;
- East side: Opataca Lake, Brock River West, Brock River (Chibougamau River);
- south side: Chibougamau River, des Orignaux Lake, Deux Orignaux River;
- West side: Naomi Creek, Omo River, Omo Lake, Maicasagi River.

== Toponymy ==
In the past, this water body was called "Wasawapositeo Lake".

The toponym "Lac Waposite" was formalized on December 5, 1968, by the Commission de toponymie du Québec, when it was created.

== See also ==
- Rupert Bay
- Broadback River, a watercourse
- Assinica River, a watercourse
- Assinica Lake, a body of water
- Assinica Wildlife Sanctuary
- Eeyou Istchee Baie-James (municipality), a municipality
- List of lakes in Canada
