= Brock River North =

Brock North
- Watershed of Nottaway River

Location
- Country: Canada
- Province: Quebec
- Region: Nord-du-Québec

Physical characteristics
- Source: Little unidentified Lake
  - location: Eeyou Istchee Baie-James, Nord-du-Québec, Quebec
  - coordinates: 50°17′09″N 74°54′22″W
  - elevation: 459 m (1,506 ft)
- Mouth: Chibougamau River
  - location: Eeyou Istchee Baie-James, Nord-du-Québec, Quebec
  - coordinates: 50°10′04″N 74°57′56″W
  - elevation: 346 m (1,135 ft)
- Length: 93.0 km (57.8 mi)

The North Brock River is a tributary of the Brock River, Brock River, flowing into the Eeyou Istchee Baie-James, in Jamésie, in the administrative region of Nord-du-Québec, in the province of Quebec, in the Canada. The course of the river crosses successively the Assinica Wildlife Reserve and the township of La Rochette.

The upper part of the hydrographic slope of the "North Brock River" is accessible by a forest road from Chibougamau and going up to the North. The lower part is served by some forest roads that come from the south where passes route 113 which connects Lebel-sur-Quévillon to Chibougamau. This road goes south of Opémisca Lake.

The surface of the "Brock North River" is usually frozen from early November to mid-May, however, safe ice movement is generally from mid-November to mid-April.

== Geography ==
The main hydrographic slopes adjacent to the "North Brock River" are:
- North side: Châtillon river, Saint-Urcisse River, De Maurès River;
- East side: Brock River (Chibougamau River), Chibougamau River, Mistassini Lake, Chibougamau Lake, Barlow River;
- South side: Brock River (Chibougamau River), Opémisca Lake, Opémisca River, Chibougamau River;
- West side: Opataca Lake, Cachisca Lake, Comencho Lake, Mildred River, Omo River, Maicasagi River.

The "Brock North River" originates at the mouth of a small unidentified lake (length: 1.6 kilometres (0.99 mi), altitude: 459 metres (1,506 ft)) in the Wildlife Reserve Assinica. This source is located on the Northeast side of a mountain whose summit reaches 563 metres (1,847 ft) at:

- 24.8 kilometres (15.4 mi) West of Mistassini Lake;
- 33.1 kilometres (20.6 mi) Northeast of Opataca Lake;
- 61.5 kilometres (38.2 mi) Northeast of the mouth of the North Brock River (confluence with the Brock River (Chibougamau River));
- 83.3 kilometres (51.8 mi) North of the mouth of the Brock River (confluence with the Chibougamau River);
- 153.0 kilometres (95.1 mi) Northeast of the mouth of the Chibougamau River (confluence with the Opawica River);
- 200.7 kilometres (124.7 mi) Northeast of the mouth of Goéland Lake (Waswanipi River);
- 97.4 kilometres (60.5 mi) North of the village center of Chapais;
- 76.9 kilometres (47.8 mi) North of downtown Chibougamau;
- 329 kilometres (204 mi) east of the mouth of the Nottaway River.

From its source, the "Brock River North" flows over 93.0 kilometres (57.8 mi) according to the following segments:

Upper Brock River North (segment of 49.0 kilometres (30.4 mi))

- 7.2 kilometres (4.5 mi) South to the north shore of a small unidentified lake;
- 9.7 kilometres (6.0 mi) southwesterly crossing three small lakes to the north shore of another small unidentified lake;
- 12.1 kilometres (7.5 mi) southwesterly through five small unidentified lakes to the east shore of Lac Samuel-Bédard;
- 20.0 kilometres (12.4 mi) southerly crossing Lake Samuel-Bédard (length: 28.0 kilometres (17.4 mi); altitude: 376 metres (1,234 ft)), up to mouth;

Lower Brock River North (segment of 44.0 kilometres (27.3 mi))

- 5.0 kilometres (3.1 mi) westerly across an unidentified lake (elevation: 373 metres (1,224 ft)) over 3.0 kilometres (1.9 mi) to its mouth;
- 12.8 kilometres (8.0 mi) South through four unidentified lakes to the mouth of the last (altitude: 369 metres (1,211 ft));
- 8.8 kilometres (5.5 mi) South to the discharge (from the East) of three lakes;
- 11.1 kilometres (6.9 mi) to the southwest, to the discharge (from the northwest) of two lakes;
- 6.3 kilometres (3.9 mi) East, then Southwesterly winding to its mouth.

The "Brock North River" flows on the North shore of the Brock River (Chibougamau River), upstream of a series of falls and rapids. From there, the current descends towards the South-West by borrowing the Brock River (Chibougamau River). From the mouth of the river, the current flows southwestward through the Chibougamau River, then through Waswanipi River to the East shore of Goéland Lake (Waswanipi River). The latter is crossed to the northwest by the Waswanipi River which is a tributary of Matagami Lake.

The mouth of the "Brock River North" located at:

- 22.0 kilometres (13.7 mi) North of the mouth of the Brock River (Chibougamau River);
- 93.0 kilometres (57.8 mi) Northwest of Opémisca Lake;
- 93.0 kilometres (57.8 mi) Northeast of the mouth of the Chibougamau River (confluence with the Opawica River);
- 148.2 kilometres (92.1 mi) Northeast of the mouth of Goéland Lake (Waswanipi River);
- 44.4 kilometres (27.6 mi) Northwest of the village center of Chapais;
- 48.5 kilometres (30.1 mi) Northwest of downtown Chibougamau.

== Toponymy ==
This hydronym evokes the memory of Reginald W. Brock, who, at the end of the 1896 geological exploration campaign, was assistant to Dr. Robert Bell of the Geological Survey of Canada, made a rapid geological reconnaissance of the road between the lakes Waswanipi Lake and Mistassini through the Waswanipi River, Chibougamau and Barlow River rivers and the Lake Waskonichi. Reginald W. Brock, Director of the Geological Survey of Canada, provided the work maps and survey instruments for the 1910 Chibougamau Geological Survey (Quebec) expedition.

The toponym "Brock River North" was formalized on December 5, 1968, at the Commission de toponymie du Québec, at the creation of this commission

== See also ==
- James Bay
- Rupert Bay
- Nottaway River, a watercourse
- Lake Matagami, a body of water
- Waswanipi River, a watercourse
- Goéland Lake (Waswanipi River), a body of water
- Lake Waswanipi, a body of water
- Chibougamau River, a watercourse
- Brock River (Chibougamau River), a watercourse
- Assinica Wildlife Sanctuary
- List of rivers of Quebec
