= Brock River West =

Brock West
- Watershed of Nottaway River

Location
- Country: Canada
- Province: Quebec
- Region: Nord-du-Québec

Physical characteristics
- Source: Brock Lake
  - location: Eeyou Istchee Baie-James, Nord-du-Québec, Quebec
  - coordinates: 50°17′09″N 74°54′22″W
  - elevation: 423 m (1,388 ft)
- Mouth: Chibougamau River
  - location: Eeyou Istchee Baie-James, Nord-du-Québec, Quebec
  - coordinates: 50°10′04″N 74°57′56″W
  - elevation: 346 m (1,135 ft)
- Length: 28.9 km (18.0 mi)

The West Brock River is a tributary of the Brock River, Brock River, flowing into the Eeyou Istchee Baie-James, in Jamésie, in the administrative region of Nord-du-Québec, in the province of Quebec, in the Canada. The course of the river crosses successively (from the upstream) the townships of La Rochette, Livillier and La Touche.

The lower portion of the "West Brock River" hydrographic slope is accessible by a few forest roads from the south where route 113 connects Lebel-sur-Quévillon to Chibougamau. This road goes south of Opémisca Lake.

The surface of the "West Brock River" is usually frozen from early November to mid-May, however, safe ice circulation is generally from mid-November to mid-April.

== Geography ==
The main hydrographic slopes adjacent to the "West Brock River" are:
- North side: Opataca Lake, Cachisca Lake, Comencho Lake;
- East side: Brock River (Chibougamau River), Chibougamau River, Brock River North, Chibougamau Lake, Barlow River;
- South side: Opémisca Lake, Opémisca River, Chibougamau River;
- West side: Chibougamau River, Mildred River, Omo River, Maicasagi River.

The "West Brock River" originates at the mouth of a small unidentified lake (length: 0.4 kilometres (0.25 mi), altitude: 453 metres (1,486 ft)) in the township of La Rochette, in the Assinica Wildlife Sanctuary. This source is located on the southwestern side of a mountain whose summit reaches 488 metres (1,601 ft) at:

- 46.5 kilometres (28.9 mi) West of Penicouane Bay at south of Mistassini Lake;
- 36.4 kilometres (22.6 mi) Northwest of Opémisca Lake;
- 12.9 kilometres (8.0 mi) North of the mouth of the Brock River West (confluence with the Brock River (Chibougamau River));
- 32.4 kilometres (20.1 mi) North of the mouth of the Brock River (confluence with the Chibougamau River);
- 101.5 kilometres (63.1 mi) Northeast of the mouth of the Chibougamau River (confluence with the Opawica River).
- 153.1 kilometres (95.1 mi) Northeast of the mouth of Goéland Lake (Waswanipi River);
- 54.1 kilometres (33.6 mi) Northwest of the village center of Chapais;
- 54.4 kilometres (33.8 mi) Northwest of downtown Chibougamau;
- 305.8 kilometres (190.0 mi) East of the mouth of the Nottaway River.

From its source, the "Brock River West" flows over 28.9 kilometres (18.0 mi) according to the following segments:

- 19.3 kilometres (12.0 mi) South, southwest to a small lake, then South, to a dump (coming from the west) of a group of lakes;
- 2.5 kilometres (1.6 mi) to the South, then to the East at the end of the segment, to the discharge (coming from the West) of two lakes;
- 7.1 kilometres (4.4 mi) East, then South, to its mouth.

The "West Brock River" flows into the North bank of the Brock River (Chibougamau River) into a river bend, downstream of a series of falls and rapids. From there, the current descends towards the South-West by borrowing the Brock River (Chibougamau River). From the mouth of the river, the current flows to the Southwest through the Chibougamau River, then through Waswanipi River to the East shore of Goéland Lake (Waswanipi River). The latter is crossed to the northwest by the Waswanipi River which is a tributary of Matagami Lake.

The mouth of the "West Brock River" located at:

- 18.8 kilometres (11.7 mi) North of the mouth of the Brock River (Chibougamau River);
- 89.6 kilometres (55.7 mi) Northeast of the mouth of the Chibougamau River (confluence with the Opawica River);
- 144.5 kilometres (89.8 mi) Northeast of the mouth of Goéland Lake (Waswanipi River);
- 29.0 kilometres (18.0 mi) Northwest of the village center of Chapais;
- 50.8 kilometres (31.6 mi) Northwest of downtown Chibougamau.

== Toponym ==
This hydronym evokes the memory of Reginald W. Brock, who, at the end of the 1896 geological exploration campaign, was assistant to Dr. Robert Bell of the Geological Survey of Canada, made a rapid geological reconnaissance of the road between the lakes Waswanipi Lake and Mistassini through the rivers Waswanipi, Chibougamau and Barlow and the Lake Waskonichi. Reginald W. Brock, Director of the Geological Survey of Canada, provided the work maps and survey instruments for the 1910 Chibougamau Geological Survey (Quebec) expedition.

The toponym "Brock River West" was formalized on December 5, 1968, at the Commission de toponymie du Québec, i.e. at the creation of this commission

== See also ==
- James Bay
- Rupert Bay
- Nottaway River, a watercourse
- Matagami Lake, a body of water
- Waswanipi River, a watercourse
- Goéland Lake (Waswanipi River), a body of water
- Lake Waswanipi, a body of water
- Chibougamau River, a watercourse
- Brock River (Chibougamau River), a watercourse
- Assinica Wildlife Sanctuary
- List of rivers of Quebec
