= Michwacho Lake =

Lake in Nord-du-Québec, Quebec

- Watershed of Nottaway River

- Location within Quebec
- Location: Eeyou Istchee James Bay Regional Government
- Coordinates: 49°56′25″N 75°02′56″W
- Type: Natural
- Basin countries: Canada
- Max. length: 9.6 kilometres (6.0 mi)
- Max. width: 1.9 kilometres (1.2 mi)
- Surface elevation: 351 metres (1,152 ft)

Michwacho Lake is a freshwater body crossed by the Chibougamau River, in the southern part of Eeyou Istchee James Bay (municipality), in the administrative region of Nord-du-Québec, in Quebec, Canada.

Michwacho Lake is entirely part of the Township of Opemisca. Forestry is the main economic activity of the sector. Recreational tourism activities come second.

The Michwacho Lake watershed is accessible via a forest road that runs around Lake Normandy and serves the southwest of the lake and the southern part of Mt. Michwacho. This last road is attached to route 113 linking Lebel-sur-Quévillon to Chibougamau.

The surface of Michwacho Lake is usually frozen from early November to mid-May, however, safe ice movement is generally from mid-November to mid-April.

== Geography ==
Lake Michwacho is crossed to the North by the Chibougamau River which comes from the South. This lake includes a peninsula stretching northeast on 3.2 kilometres (2.0 mi) that bypasses the current. This lake is also supplied by the Shamrock Lake outlet (coming from the west), which has 29 islands.

A bay of the lake stretches out on the Southwest to the foot of Mount Michwacho with a peak of 538 metres (1,765 ft). Another connected bay on the north side stretches westward on 1.1 kilometres (0.68 mi) to the foot of Mount Roy, whose summit reaches 498 metres (1,634 ft).

This lake has a length of 9.6 kilometres (6.0 mi), a maximum width of 1.9 kilometres (1.2 mi) and an altitude of 351 metres (1,152 ft).

The mouth of Lake Michwacho is located at the bottom of a bay on the north side, at:

- 52.8 kilometres (32.8 mi) west of Chibougamau Lake;
- 71.8 kilometres (44.6 mi) north-east of the mouth of the Chibougamau River (confluence with the Opawica River);
- 134.6 kilometres (83.6 mi) northeast of the mouth of Goéland Lake (Waswanipi River);
- 48.7 kilometres (30.3 mi) south-west of downtown Chibougamau;
- 23.3 kilometres (14.5 mi) north-west of the village center of Chapais, Quebec;
- 312 kilometres (194 mi) Southeast of the mouth of the Nottaway River.

The main hydrographic slopes near Lake Michwacho are:

- North side: Chibougamau River, Brock River, Brock River West;
- East side: Chibougamau River, Opémisca Lake, Opémisca River;
- South side: Chibougamau River, Obatogamau River;
- West side: Deception Creek, Orignaux Lake, Chibougamau River, La Trêve Lake.

== Toponymy ==
Formerly, this name has been designated "Mikwasash Lake" and "Wikwasash Lake".

The toponym "Lake Michwacho" was formalized on December 5, 1968, by the Commission de toponymie du Québec when it was created.

== See also ==
- James Bay
- Rupert Bay
- Nottaway River, a watercourse
- Matagami Lake, a body of water
- Waswanipi River, a watercourse
- Chibougamau River, a watercourse
- Eeyou Istchee Baie-James (municipality), a municipality
- List of lakes in Canada
