= Omo River (disambiguation) =

Omo River may refer to:

- Omo River, a stream in Ethiopia, part of an endorheic basin draining into Lake Turkana
- Omo River (Quebec), a tributary of the Maicasagi River in Canada
