= Cachisca Lake =

Lake in Quebec, Canada

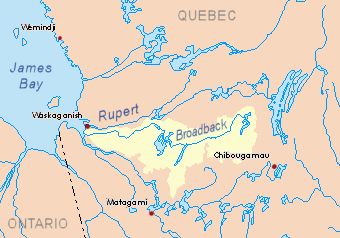
- Watershed of Broadback River

- Location within Quebec
- Location: Eeyou Istchee James Bay Regional Government
- Coordinates: 50°28′03″N 74°59′57″W
- Type: Natural
- Primary inflows: Outlet of Opataca Lake
- Primary outflows: Comencho Lake
- Basin countries: Canada
- Max. length: 15.9 kilometres (9.9 mi)
- Max. width: 6.2 kilometres (3.9 mi)
- Surface area: 10 kilometres (6.2 mi)
- Surface elevation: 361 metres (1,184 ft)

Cachisca Lake is a body of water in the Broadback River watershed in the Eeyou Istchee James Bay (municipality) area of the Nord-du-Québec, in the province of Quebec, in Canada. This lake is part of the territory of Assinica Wildlife Sanctuary and Turgis Township.

Forestry is the main economic activity of the sector. Recreational tourism activities come second.

The nearest forest road is located 50.3 kilometres (31.3 mi) south-east of the lake, the road skirting Mount Opémisca from the north; this road joins towards the south the route 113 (connecting Lebel-sur-Quévillon and Chibougamau) and the Canadian National Railway.

The surface of Cachisca Lake is usually frozen from early November to mid-May, however, safe ice movement is generally from mid-November to mid-April.

== Geography ==
Cachisca Lake has a length of 15.9 kilometres (9.9 mi), a maximum width of 6.2 kilometres (3.9 mi) and an altitude of 350 metres (1,150 ft). The shape of the lake is narrower towards the North and more flared towards the South where there are several islands and peninsulas.

Lake Cachisca is embedded between Opataca Lake (east) and Assinica Lake (west). Lake Cachisca is located to the south of mountains whose several peaks reach more than 500 metres (1,600 ft): eleven summits to the North et six summits to the West.

The mouth of Lake Cachisca is located at:

- 8.8 kilometres (5.5 mi) east of the mouth of Comencho Lake;
- 20.6 kilometres (12.8 mi) south-east of the mouth of Assinica Lake;
- 45.9 kilometres (28.5 mi) southeast of the mouth of the Assinica River (confluence with the Broadback River;
- 142.6 kilometres (88.6 mi) east of the mouth of Evans Lake;
- 283 kilometres (176 mi) east of the mouth of the Broadback River (confluence with Rupert Bay);
- 76.3 kilometres (47.4 mi) north-west of downtown Chibougamau;
- 73.5 kilometres (45.7 mi) northwest of the village center of Chapais, Quebec

The main hydrographic slopes near Cachisca Lake are:

- North side: Frotet Lake, Regnault Lake, Chatillon River, Broadback River, Troilus Lake;
- East side: Opataca Lake, Brock River West, Brock River North, Chibougamau River, Mistassini Lake;
- South side: Comencho Lake, Waposite Lake, Chibougamau River, Brock River (Chibougamau River);
- West side: Naomi Creek, Omo River, Omo Lake, Maicasagi River.

== Toponymy ==
Formerly, this body of water was designated "Lake Capacwachipsca". In 1939, the Quebec Geography Commission formalized this hydronym. Of Cree origin, this hydronym translates an abbreviated form of "Capacwachipsca", which could mean "lake rock in shallow water."

The toponym "Lac Cachisca" was formalized on December 5, 1968, by the Commission de toponymie du Québec, when it was created.

== See also ==
- Rupert Bay
- Broadback River, a watercourse
- Assinica River, a watercourse
- Assinica Lake, a body of water
- Comencho Lake, a body of water
- Assinica Wildlife Sanctuary
- Eeyou Istchee Baie-James (municipality), a municipality
- List of lakes in Canada
