= Omo River (Quebec) =

Omo
- Watershed of Nottaway River

Location
- Country: Canada
- Province: Quebec
- Region: Eeyou Istchee Baie-James (municipality)

Physical characteristics
- Source: Little unidentified lake
  - location: Eeyou Istchee Baie-James (municipality), Nord-du-Québec, Quebec
  - coordinates: 50°23′34″N 75°21′52″W
  - elevation: 371 m (1,217 ft)
- Mouth: Maicasagi River
  - location: Eeyou Istchee Baie-James (municipality), Nord-du-Québec, Quebec
  - coordinates: 50°07′40″N 75°46′59″W
  - elevation: 323 m (1,060 ft)
- Length: 60.4 km (37.5 mi)

The Omo River is a tributary of the Maicasagi River located at Eeyou Istchee Baie-James (municipality), in the administrative region of Nord-du-Québec, in the Canadian province of Quebec, in Canada.

The upper part of the course of the Omo River flows in the southwestern part of the Assinica Wildlife Sanctuary, then the river flow in township De Lucière, De Berey and De Dobeil.

The hydrographic slope of the Omo River is served by road 113 linking Lebel-sur-Quévillon to Chibougamau.

The surface of the Omo River is usually frozen from early November to mid-May, however safe ice movement is generally from mid-November to mid-April.

== Geography ==
The main hydrographic slopes near the Omo River are:

- North side: Assinica Lake, Assinica River, Brock River;
- East side: Comencho Lake, Opataca Lake;
- South side: Mildred River, Caupichigau River, Chibougamau River;
- West side: Maicasagi River, Monsan River.

The Omo River originates at the mouth of an unidentified lake (length: 3.4 kilometres (2.1 mi) altitude: 385 metres (1,263 ft)) in the Assinica Wildlife Sanctuary. This source of the river is located at:

- 44.9 kilometres (27.9 mi) North of the mouth of the Omo River (confluence with the Maicasagi River);
- 101.4 kilometres (63.0 mi) Northeast of the mouth of the Maicasagi River (confluence with Maicasagi Lake);
- 130.3 kilometres (81.0 mi) Northeast of the mouth of Goéland Lake (Waswanipi River);
- 162.6 kilometres (101.0 mi) Northeast of the mouth of Matagami Lake;
- 318.2 kilometres (197.7 mi) South of the mouth of the Nottaway River;
- 180.5 kilometres (112.2 mi) Northeast of downtown Matagami.

From the head lake, the Omo River flows on 60.4 kilometres (37.5 mi) in the Assinica Wildlife Sanctuary, according to the following segments:

== Toponymy ==
The toponym "Monsan River" was formalized on December 5, 1968, at the Commission de toponymie du Québec, i.e. at the creation of this commission

Upper part of the Omo River (segment of 37.9 kilometres (23.5 mi))

- 7.9 kilometres (4.9 mi) westerly crossing an unidentified lake (length: 1.1 kilometres (0.68 mi); altitude: 378 metres (1,240 ft)), then to the South crossing a second unidentified lake (length: 2.4 kilometres (1.5 mi); altitude: 372 metres (1,220 ft)), to a creek (coming from the Northeast);
- 3.2 kilometres (2.0 mi) southwesterly, crossing an unidentified lake (length: 1.4 kilometres (0.87 mi); altitude: 360 metres (1,180 ft)), up to at its mouth;
- 7.8 kilometres (4.8 mi) to the Southwest, then crossing an unidentified lake (length: 1.5 kilometres (0.93 mi); altitude: 361 metres (1,184 ft)) to at its mouth;
- 8.0 kilometres (5.0 mi) southwesterly to a bay on the eastern shore of Lake Omo;
- 11.0 kilometres (6.8 mi) southwesterly, crossing Omo Lake (elevation: 335 metres (1,099 ft)) over its full length;

Lower part of the Omo River (segment of 22.5 kilometres (14.0 mi))

- 3.7 kilometres (2.3 mi) to the Southeast, crossing an unidentified lake (length: 2.6 kilometres (1.6 mi); altitude: 335 metres (1,099 ft)), up to at its confluence;
- 1.8 kilometres (1.1 mi) westerly across an unidentified lake (length: 5.0 kilometres (3.1 mi); altitude: 335 metres (1,099 ft)), to its confluence;
- 5.8 kilometres (3.6 mi) southwesterly across an unidentified lake (length: 6.4 kilometres (4.0 mi); altitude: 333 metres (1,093 ft)), its confluence;
- 11.2 kilometres (7.0 mi) southeasterly to mouth.

The "Omo River" flows into a river bend on the east bank of the Maicasagi River. From there, it flows southwest and west to the east shore of Maicasagi Lake. Then the current flows south-west through the Max Passage into the Goéland Lake. The latter is crossed to the northwest by the Waswanipi River which is a tributary of Matagami Lake.

The mouth of the Omo River located at:

- 60.5 kilometres (37.6 mi) Northeast of the mouth of the Maicasagi River (confluence with Maicasagi Lake);
- 89.1 kilometres (55.4 mi) Northeast of the mouth of Gull Lake (Waswanipi River);
- 107.3 kilometres (66.7 mi) Northeast of the mouth of Olga Lake (Waswanipi River);

North of the village center of Waswanipi;

- 146.5 kilometres (91.0 mi) Northeast of downtown Matagami.

== Toponymy ==
Of Cree origin, this hydronym means the river where I ate only part of the dinner.

The toponym "Omo River" was formalized on December 5, 1968, at the Commission de toponymie du Québec, i.e. at the creation of this commission

== See also ==
- James Bay
- Rupert Bay
- Nottaway River, a watercourse
- Matagami Lake, a body of water
- Waswanipi River, a watercourse
- Goéland Lake (Waswanipi River), a body of water
- Maicasagi Lake, a body of water
- Maicasagi River, a watercourse
- Assinica Wildlife Sanctuary
- List of rivers of Quebec
