= Opémisca River =

Opémisca
- Watershed of Nottaway River

Location
- Country: Canada
- Province: Quebec
- Region: Nord-du-Québec

Physical characteristics
- Source: Forested creek
  - location: Eeyou Istchee Baie-James, Nord-du-Québec, Quebec
  - coordinates: 49°58′33″N 74°45′47″W
  - elevation: 379 m (1,243 ft)
- Mouth: Chibougamau River (via Opémisca Lake)
  - location: Eeyou Istchee Baie-James, Nord-du-Québec, Quebec
  - coordinates: 49°57′21″N 74°54′38″W
  - elevation: 358 m (1,175 ft)
- Length: 39.1 km (24.3 mi)

The Opémisca River is a tributary of the Chibougamau River, flowing into the regional County Municipality (RCM) of Eeyou Istchee Baie-James, within the administrative region of Nord-du-Québec, province of Quebec, Canada. The course of the river crosses the townships of Cuvier and Rageot.

The hydrographic slope of the Opémisca River is accessible by a forest road on the North shore of Opémisca Lake and connecting South to route 113 which connects Lebel-sur-Quévillon to Chibougamau and passes South of the lake.

The surface of the Opémisca River is usually frozen from early November to mid-May, however, safe ice circulation is generally from mid-November to mid-April.

== Geography ==
The main hydrographic slopes near the Opémisca River are:
- North side: Crinkle Creek, Brock River (Chibougamau River), Brock River North, Opataca Lake;
- East side: Chibougamau River, Lac du Sauvage, Chibougamau Lake;
- South side: Opémisca Lake, Chibougamau River;
- West side: Chibougamau River, Brock River (Chibougamau River), Michwacho Lake.

The Opémisca River originates from a forest stream (elevation: 358 metres (1,175 ft)) in the Cuvier township. This source is located at:

- 7.4 kilometres (4.6 mi) North of Opémisca Lake;
- 10.8 kilometres (6.7 mi) Northeast of the mouth of the Opémisca River;
- 18.6 kilometres (11.6 mi) Northeast of the mouth of Opémisca Lake;
- 92.5 kilometres (57.5 mi) Northeast of the mouth of the Chibougamau River;
- 155.8 kilometres (96.8 mi) Northeast of the mouth of Goéland Lake (Waswanipi River);
- 21.9 kilometres (13.6 mi) North of the village center of Chapais;
- 28.6 kilometres (17.8 mi) West of downtown Chibougamau;
- 329.3 kilometres (204.6 mi) South of the mouth of the Nottaway River.

From its source, the Opémisca River flows on 39.1 kilometres (24.3 mi) according to the following segments:

- 4.8 kilometres (3.0 mi) northeasterly to a creek (coming from the East);
- 0.8 kilometres (0.50 mi) northwesterly to a creek (coming from the Northeast);
- 4.9 kilometres (3.0 mi) southwesterly to a creek (coming from the South);
- 12.2 kilometres (7.6 mi) northwesterly to a creek (coming from the Northeast);
- 13.2 kilometres (8.2 mi) southwesterly, crossing a lake at a distance of 1.2 kilometres (0.75 mi) (length: 1.7 kilometres (1.1 mi); altitude: 358 metres (1,175 ft)) to a forest road (East-West direction). Note: This lake straddles the townships of Rageot and Cuvier;
- 3.2 kilometres (2.0 mi) southwesterly to mouth.

The Opémisca River flows into a small bay on the north shore of Opémisca Lake, at 0.9 kilometres (0.56 mi) west of the mouth of Leclerc Creek and at 0.4 kilometres (0.25 mi) East of the boundary of the Township of Opémisca. From this mouth, the current flows through Opémisca Lake to 8.3 kilometres (5.2 mi) towards the Southwest; this lake is crossed towards the West by the Chibougamau River. From there, the current runs Southwest through the Chibougamau River, tien through Waswanipi River to the East shore of Goéland Lake (Waswanipi River). The latter is crossed to the northwest by the Waswanipi River which is a tributary of Matagami Lake.

The mouth of the Opémisca River located at:

- 3.7 kilometres (2.3 mi) East of the summit of Mount Opémisca (altitude: 530 metres (1,740 ft));
- 8.0 kilometres (5.0 mi) Northeast of the mouth of Opémisca Lake;
- 81.3 kilometres (50.5 mi) Northeast of the mouth of the Chibougamau River (confluence with the Opawica River);
- 145.4 kilometres (90.3 mi) Northeast of the mouth of Goéland Lake (Waswanipi River);
- 20.1 kilometres (12.5 mi) Northwest of the village center of Chapais;
- 39.0 kilometres (24.2 mi) Southwest of downtown Chibougamau.

== Toponymy ==
Of Cree origin, this hydronym means "the river of sandy shrubs".

The toponym "Opémisca River" was formalized on December 5, 1968, at the Commission de toponymie du Québec, i.e. at the creation of this commission

== See also ==
- James Bay
- Rupert Bay
- Nottaway River, a watercourse
- Matagami Lake, a body of water
- Waswanipi River, a watercourse
- Goéland Lake (Waswanipi River), a body of water
- Lake Waswanipi, a body of water
- Chibougamau River, a watercourse
- Opémisca Lake, a watercourse
- List of rivers of Quebec
