= Assinica River =

Assinica
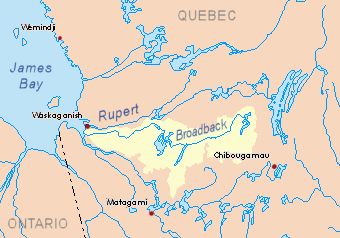
- Watershed of Broadback River

Location
- Country: Canada
- Province: Quebec
- Region: Nord-du-Québec

Physical characteristics
- Source: Assinica Lake
  - location: Nord-du-Québec, Eeyou Istchee Baie-James (municipality), Quebec
  - coordinates: 50°32′55″N 75°18′18″W
  - elevation: 359 m (1,178 ft)
- Mouth: Broadback River
  - location: Eeyou Istchee Baie-James (municipality), Nord-du-Québec, Quebec
  - coordinates: 50°42′36″N 75°33′24″W
  - elevation: 291 m (955 ft)
- Length: 59.2 km (36.8 mi)

Basin features
- Tributaries
  - left: (upstream); Lucky Strike creek; outlet of Capichigamau Lake; outlet of Triart Lake.
  - right: Outlet of a set of lakes such as Dalogny; Clapier; Saint-Poncy; Savournin; Gariteau; de la Bruine; Perdu.

The Assinica River is a tributary of the Broadback River flowing west to Rupert Bay south of James Bay. The Assinica River flows into the municipality of Eeyou Istchee Baie-James (municipality) in the Nord-du-Québec administrative region, in Quebec, in Canada.

The group of head lakes of the Assinica River is composed of lakes: Assinica, Comencho, Waposite, Cachisca and Opataca. Forestry is the main economic activity of the sector. Recreational tourism activities come second.

The nearest forest road is located 60.6 kilometres (37.7 mi) south-east of the lake, the road skirting the northern side of Mount Opemisca; this road joins towards the south the route 113 (connecting Lebel-sur-Quévillon and Chibougamau) and the Canadian National Railway.

The surface of the Assinica River is usually frozen from early November to mid-May, however, safe ice movement is generally from mid-November to mid-April.

== Geography ==
The hydrographic slopes adjacent to the Assinica River are:
- north side: Broadback River, Deriares Lake, Camousichouane Lake;
- east side: Broadback River, Assinica Lake, Labeau Lake, Troïlus Lake, Frotet Lake, Mistassini Lake;
- south side: Assinica Lake, Comencho Lake, Capichigamau Lake;
- west side: Lucky Strike Creek, Broadback River, Evans Lake, Nipukatasi River.

The Assinica Lake (elevation: 359 metres (1,178 ft)) is the head lake of the Assinica River. The mouth of the lake is located to the northwest.

From the mouth of this lake, the Assinica River flows for 59.2 kilometres (36.8 mi) along the following segments:

- 25.1 kilometres (15.6 mi) westerly crossing several rapids, then lakes Trépezet (altitude: 342 m), Thiballier (altitude: 339 metres (1,112 ft)) and Boissy (altitude: 319 metres (1,047 ft)); in this segment, the river gathers on the south side the outlet of Triat Lake, as well as the outlet of Chevardière Lake and Lafargue Lake;
- 15.8 kilometres (9.8 mi) northerly across an unnamed lake and collecting the waters of the Sirmac Lake outlet from the east;
- 5.9 kilometres (3.7 mi) westerly across several rapids to the outlet of Lucky Strike Creek;
- 12.4 kilometres (7.7 mi) to the northeast crossing several rapids at the beginning of this segment, to its mouth.

The Assinica River flows on the south bank of the Broadback River, in a bend of the river, into an archipelago area. This mouth is located at:

- 98.6 kilometres (61.3 mi) east of the mouth of Evans Lake, which is crossed by the Broadback River;
- 241.4 kilometres (150.0 mi) East of the confluence of the Broadback River, with the Rupert Bay;
- 122.4 kilometres (76.1 mi) north-west of downtown Chibougamau;
- 108.6 kilometres (67.5 mi) west of Mistassini Lake;
- 24.5 kilometres (15.2 mi) northwest of Assinica Lake.

== Toponymy ==
Of Cree origin, this hydronym means "river filled with stones".

The toponym 'rivière Assinica' was formalized on December 5, 1968, at the Commission de toponymie du Québec.

== See also ==
- James Bay
- Rupert Bay
- Broadback River, a watercourse
- Eeyou Istchee James Bay (municipality)
- Jamésie
- List of rivers of Quebec
