= Opataca Lake =

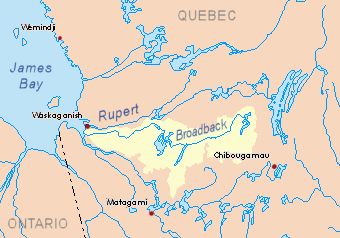
- Watershed of Broadback River

- Location within Quebec
- Location: Eeyou Istchee James Bay Regional Government
- Coordinates: 50°23′57″N 74°54′42″W
- Type: Natural
- Primary inflows: Outlet of a set of lakes such as Oudiette and Guigues (North side); outlet of an unidentified lake (East side); outlet of a set of unidentified lakes (South-East side); outlet of a set of lakes (West side).
- Primary outflows: Cachisca Lake
- Basin countries: Canada
- Max. length: 40 kilometres (25 mi)
- Max. width: 17.5 kilometres (10.9 mi)
- Surface area: 63.43 kilometres (39.41 mi)
- Surface elevation: 366 metres (1,201 ft)

Lake Opataca is a body of water in the Broadback River watershed in the Eeyou Istchee James Bay (municipality) area in the Nord-du-Québec, in the province of Quebec, in Canada. This lake is part of territory of the Assinica Wildlife Sanctuary.

The southern part of the lake is part of the canton of Livilier. Lake Opataca is part of a group of lakes at the head of the [Broadback River].

Forestry is the main economic activity of the sector. Recreational tourism activities come second.

The nearest forest road is located at 21.9 kilometres (13.6 mi) south-east of the lake, the road skirting Mount Opémisca from the north; this road joins Southbound on route 113 (connecting Lebel-sur-Quévillon to Chibougamau) and the Canadian National Railway.

The surface of Opataca Lake is usually frozen from early November to mid-May, however, safe ice circulation is generally mid-November to mid-April.

== Geography ==
Opataca Lake has a length of 40.0 kilometres (24.9 mi), a maximum width of 17.5 kilometres (10.9 mi) and an altitude of 366 metres (1,201 ft). The shape of the lake is everything in length, except the central part facing the mouth which has an enlargement forming a large bay on the west side leading to the mouth.

Opataca Lake is embedded between the slopes of the Brock River North at east, and at west, the lakes Cachisca and Comencho. Lake Opataca is surrounded by mountains with dozens of peaks exceeding 400 metres (1,300 ft).

The mouth of Lake Opataca is located at:

- 8.1 kilometres (5.0 mi) east of the mouth of Cachisca Lake;
- 17.0 kilometres (10.6 mi) east of the mouth of Comencho Lake;
- 27.9 kilometres (17.3 mi) south-east of the mouth of Assinica Lake;
- 53.3 kilometres (33.1 mi) south-east of the mouth of the Assinica River (confluence with the Broadback River;
- 150.5 kilometres (93.5 mi) east of the mouth of Evans Lake;
- 290.1 kilometres (180.3 mi) east of the mouth of the Broadback River (confluence with Rupert Bay);
- 69.6 kilometres (43.2 mi) north-west of downtown Chibougamau;
- 69.8 kilometres (43.4 mi) northwest of the village center of Chapais, Quebec.

The main hydrographic slopes near Lake Opataca are:

- North side: Oudiette Lake, Frotet Lake, Regnault Lake, Chatillon River, Broadback River, Troilus Lake;
- East side: Lemieux Lake, Brock River West, Brock River North, Chibougamau River, Mistassini Lake;
- South side: Dumas Lake, Brock River West, Chibougamau River, Brock River North;
- West side: Blanchet Lake, Waposite Lake, Cachisca Lake, Comencho Lake, Assinica River, Assinica Lake.

== Toponymy ==
This toponym was recorded around 1930 in a topographic survey of the region by the surveyor J.-M. Roy. Presumably of Cree origin, this toponym could mean "it is a pass, a narrow passage, on the water, between two elevations of ground".

The toponym "Lake Opataca" was formalized on December 5, 1968, by the Commission de toponymie du Québec, when it was created.

== See also ==
- Rupert Bay
- Broadback River, a watercourse
- Assinica River, a watercourse
- Assinica Lake, a body of water
- Comencho Lake, a body of water
- Cachisca Lake, a body of water
- Assinica Wildlife Sanctuary
- Eeyou Istchee Baie-James (municipality), a municipality
- List of lakes in Canada
