= Assinica Lake =

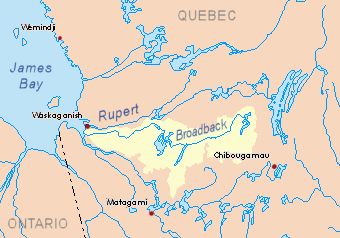
- Watershed of Broadback River

- Location within Quebec
- Location: Eeyou Istchee James Bay Regional Government
- Coordinates: 50°31′28″N 75°13′26″W
- Type: Natural
- Primary inflows: Outlet (from South-East) of Caplan Lake; outlet (from South-East) of a set of lakes such Mair, Olmstead, Lagnel, Gaulin and Charlie; outlet (from East) of Comencho Lake which receive water from upstreams lakes such as Waposite, Cachisca and Opataca.
- Primary outflows: Assinica Lake
- Basin countries: Canada
- Max. length: 20.6 kilometres (12.8 mi)
- Max. width: 11.3 kilometres (7.0 mi)
- Surface area: 93 kilometres (58 mi)
- Surface elevation: 359 metres (1,178 ft)

Assinica Lake is a fresh water body on the hydrographic slope of the Assinica River and Broadback Rivers, flowing into the Municipality of Eeyou Istchee Bay- James (municipality), in the administrative region of Nord-du-Québec, in Quebec, Canada.

Lake Opataca is part of a group of lakes at the head of the Assinica River. Forestry is the main economic activity of the sector. Recreational tourism activities come second.

The nearest forest road is located at 61.3 kilometres (38.1 mi) south-east of the lake, the road skirting Mount Opémisca from the north; this road joins Southbound on route 113 connecting Lebel-sur-Quévillon to Chibougamau and the Canadian National Railway.

The surface of Opataca Lake is usually frozen from early November to mid-May, however, safe ice circulation is generally mid-November to mid-April.

== Geography ==
The hydrographic slopes near Lake Assinica are:
- North side: Savournin Lake, Broadback River, Labeau Lake, Frotet Lake, Troilus Lake;
- East side: Cachisca Lake, Opataca Lake, Mistassini Lake;
- South side: Comencho Lake, Chibougamau River, Brock River West;
- West side: Lafargue Lake, Capichigamau Lake.

With a surface area of 93 km^{2}, lake Assinica has a complex shape, with innumerable bays, peninsulas and a hundred islands. Many wetlands are located nearby, especially on the east side of the lake and partly on the west side. Lake Assinica is connected on the south side to Caplan Lake. Lookout Hill (top at 459 metres (1,506 ft)) is located to the south. Another peak reached 513 metres (1,683 ft) in the Southwest. The lake has four large islands at its center, the longest of which reaches 5.8 kilometres (3.6 mi).

The mouth of Lake Assinica is located on the North-West side at:

- 25.6 kilometres (15.9 mi) South of the mouth of the Assinica River;
- 122.7 kilometres (76.2 mi) east of the mouth of Evans Lake;
- 264.7 kilometres (164.5 mi) east of the mouth of the Broadback River;
- 86.4 kilometres (53.7 mi) west of Mistassini Lake;
- 95.2 kilometres (59.2 mi) north-west of downtown Chibougamau.
Its emissary is the Assinica River, which flows a priori to the west, then to the north, to the south bank of the Broadback River where it empties.

== Toponymy ==
The term "Assinica" has been assigned by the Commission de toponymie du Québec to the lake, the river and the Wildlife Reserve.

Of Cree origin, the term "Assinica" derives from the term "Asinikaw", whose roots are "asini, pierre and kaw" (verbal suffix equivalent to the verb "to be" in French), meaning "filled with stones".

The old map documents indicate that prior to 1932 the term applied to a set of lakes on the same hydrographic slope. Today, Assinica now only refers to the most westerly hydrographic entity. The spelling of the place name Assinica has long been spelled "Assinika".

Covering an area of 8,885 km^{2}, the Assinica Wildlife Refuge encircles the lake.

The toponym lac Assinica was formalized on December 5, 1968, at the Commission de toponymie du Québec.

== See also ==
- James Bay
- Rupert Bay
- Broadback River
- Assinica River
- Comencho Lake, a body of water
- Assinica Wildlife Sanctuary
- Eeyou Istchee Baie-James (municipality), a municipality
- List of lakes in Canada
