= Comencho Lake =

Lake in Quebec, Canada

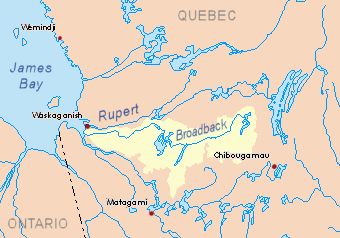
- Watershed of Broadback River

- Location within Quebec
- Location: Eeyou Istchee James Bay Regional Government
- Coordinates: 50°21′32″N 75°09′08″W
- Type: Natural
- Primary inflows: outlet of Waposite Lake; outlet of Trois Îles Lake; outlet of Cachisca Lake; Oulet of Opataca Lake.
- Primary outflows: Assinica Lake
- Basin countries: Canada
- Max. length: 26.3 kilometres (16.3 mi)
- Max. width: 5.3 kilometres (3.3 mi)
- Surface elevation: 358 metres (1,175 ft)

Comencho Lake is a body of water in the Broadback River watershed in the Eeyou Istchee James Bay (municipality) area within the Nord-du-Québec, in the province of Quebec, in Canada. This lake is part of the territory of the Assinica Wildlife Sanctuary.

Forestry is the main economic activity of the sector. Recreational tourism activities come second.

The nearest road is located at 48.1 kilometres (29.9 mi) south of the lake, which is route 113 (connecting Lebel-sur-Quévillon and Chibougamau) and the railroad of Canadian National Railway.

The surface of Comencho Lake is usually frozen from early November to mid-May, however, safe ice circulation is generally from mid-November to mid-April.

== Geography ==
Comencho Lake has a length of 26.3 kilometres (16.3 mi), a maximum width of 5.3 kilometres (3.3 mi) and an altitude of 358 metres (1,175 ft).

Lake Comencho has three main parts:

- northern part: receiving from the north-east the waters of Cachisca Lake which includes a dam at its mouth and whose main bodies of water upstream are Dumas Lake, Opataca Lake;
- central part: with several islands;
- southern part: extending towards the South-East especially in the canton of Turgis, in the South of a big peninsula (6.3 kilometres (3.9 mi) by 3.1 kilometres (1.9 mi)) oriented toward east which has a mountain whose summit reaches 461 metres (1,512 ft).

A peninsula 6.4 km long separates the mouth of Lake Comencho and Assinica Lake, forming a strait (North-South axis) of 6.3 km. This mouth is located at:

- 13.2 kilometres (8.2 mi) south-east of the mouth of Assinica Lake;
- 38.5 kilometres (23.9 mi) south-east of the mouth of the Assinica River (confluence with the Broadback River);
- 133.6 kilometres (83.0 mi) east of the mouth of Evans Lake;
- 273.8 kilometres (170.1 mi) east of the mouth of the Broadback River (confluence with Rupert Bay);
- 84.0 kilometres (52.2 mi) north-west of downtown Chibougamau;
- 77.8 kilometres (48.3 mi) northwest of the village center of Chapais, Quebec.

The main hydrographic slopes near Lake Comencho are:

- North side: Assinica Lake, Assinica River, Broadback River, Labeau Lake;
- East side: Cachisca Lake, Opataca Lake, Brock North River, Brock River (Chibougamau River);
- South side: Waposite Lake, Opataca Lake, Chibougamau River, Des Orignaux Lake, Deux Orignaux River;
- West side: Monsan River, Capichigamau Lake, Lucky Strike Creek.

== Toponymy ==
Presumably of Cree origin, the origin and significance of this hydronym remain uncertain. Nevertheless, the graph of the current hydronym is a modification of Comenscocho and Comenscacho; the first dating back at least to 1931, being indicated on a plan of survey. From 1939, the Comencho form is used on map documents. The nearby Lake Assinica has already been designated Comenscamoca. These toponyms and their variant have in common the root men or min meaning "blueberries". The name Caminscanane Lake, denoting a lake to the west of the previous ones, has been translated as "where there are many blueberries".

The toponym "lake Comencho" was officialized on December 5, 1968, by the Commission de toponymie du Québec, when it was created.

== See also ==
- Rupert Bay
- Broadback River, a watercourse
- Assinica River, a watercourse
- Assinica Lake, a body of water
- Assinica Wildlife Sanctuary
- Eeyou Istchee Baie-James (municipality), a municipality
- List of lakes in Canada
