= Reginald Walter Brock =

Reginald Walter Brock FRSC FRGS, (January 10, 1874 – July 30, 1935) was a Canadian geologist, academic, and civil servant. He was Director of the Geological Survey of Canada from 1907 to 1914, in addition to being Deputy Minister of Mines in 1914. On the outbreak of the First World War, he joined the Canadian Army. In 1919, he became Professor of Geology and Dean of Applied Sciences at the University of British Columbia. He was President of the Royal Society of Canada in 1935–36.

== Early life and education ==
Brock was born on January 10, 1874, in Perth, Ontario to Rev. Thomas B. and Marian Jenkins Brock. Following his father's death in 1886, his family settled in Ottawa and Brock attended Ottawa Collegiate Institute and Mount Forest High School. He then attended the University of Toronto and obtained a summer apprenticeship as a field assistant to geologist Robert Bell. While attending the university, Brock also became acquainted with Willet Green Miller who encouraged him to transfer to Queen's University at Kingston to pursue courses in chemistry and mineralogy. Brock had previously taken two years off from university due an illness which weakened his eyesight and made extensive reading impossible. Miller promised him that he could complete his degree and "graduate without reading." He subsequently completed his bachelor's degree at Queen's within 18 months and then graduated with a Master's degree and medal in mineralogy.

== Career ==
He was Director of the Geological Survey of Canada from 1907 to 1914, in addition to being Deputy Minister of Mines in 1914. On the outbreak of the First World War, he joined the Canadian Army. In 1919, he became Professor of Geology and Dean of Applied Sciences at the University of British Columbia. He was President of the Royal Society of Canada in 1935–36.

== Death and legacy ==
Brock died on July 30, 1935 following an airplane crash. Brock Island and Brock River are named in his honour.
