= Opémisca Lake =

Lake in the country of Canada

- Watershed of Nottaway River

- Location within Quebec
- Location: Eeyou Istchee Baie-James
- Coordinates: 49°55′03″N 74°52′03″W
- Type: Natural
- Primary inflows: Chibougamau River, Opémisca River, Leclerc creek, Springer creek, Daubrée creek.
- Primary outflows: Chibougamau River
- Basin countries: Canada
- Max. length: 22.3 kilometres (13.9 mi)
- Max. width: 14.3 kilometres (8.9 mi)
- Surface elevation: 358 metres (1,175 ft)

Opémisca Lake is a freshwater body of the Eeyou Istchee Baie-James, in Jamésie, in the administrative region of Nord-du-Québec, in the province of Quebec, in Canada. The surface of the lake extends in the cantons of Cuvier, Lévy, Daubrée and Opémisca.

Forestry is the main economic activity of the sector. Recreational tourism activities come second. Recreotourism activities, especially boating and vacationing, are popular, particularly because of the proximity of the village of Chapais, located in the south. Several cottages and a beach campground are located on the shores of West Bay.

The Opémisca Lake hydrographic slope is accessible on the east side by a forest road from the south and on the west side by a secondary road serving the hamlet of West Bay; these two secondary roads stand out from road 113 which runs east-west to the south of the lake.

The surface of "Lake Opémisca" is usually frozen from early November to mid-May, however, safe ice circulation is generally from mid-November to mid-April.

== Geography ==
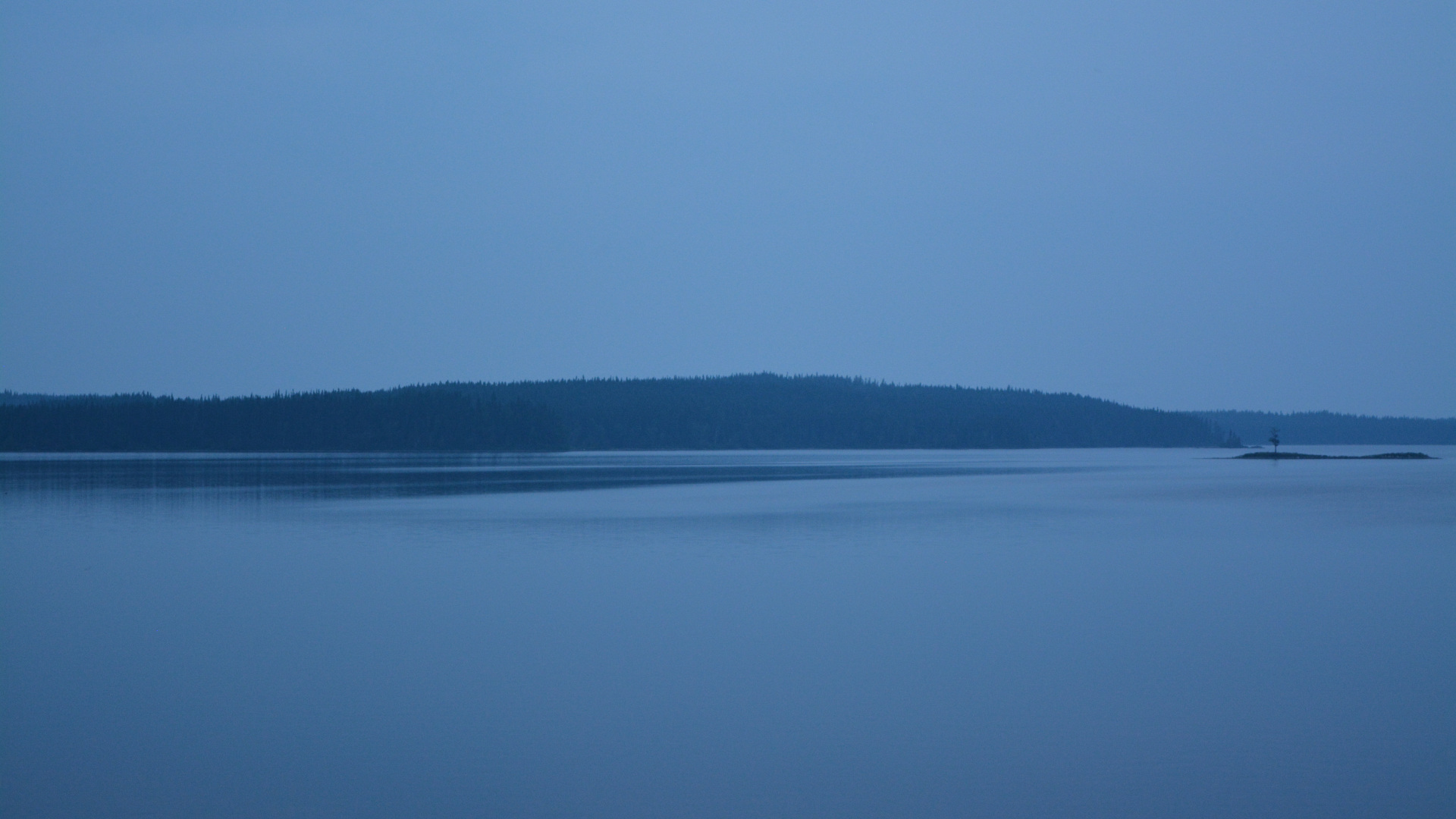
Opémisca Lake viewed from Camping Opémiska

Lake Opemisca is fed on the east side by the Chibougamau River which crosses the "Rapides Entre les Îles" where a bridge is laid out for the forest road leading north. The latter serves the north-west side of "Lake du Sauvage" and the northern side of Opémisca and Michwacho lakes. This lake is also fed on the north side by the Opémisca River and Leclerc Creek; on the south side by Springer Creek and Daubrée Creek.

This lake is an extension of the Chibougamau River (tributary of the Waswanipi River). Lake Opémisca has a length of 22.3 kilometres (13.9 mi), a maximum width of 14.3 kilometres (8.9 mi) and an altitude of 358 metres (1,175 ft). The very irregular contours of this lake total 148 kilometres (92 mi).

Of a complex configuration, the "Lake Opémisca" is divided into three parts each of which includes many bays and peninsulas. Most islands are in the northwestern part of the lake; the largest being "La Grosse Île" (length: 4.2 kilometres (2.6 mi)) that straddles the townships of Opémisca and Cuvier.

The Cree village of Oujé-Bougoumou is located on the north shore of Opémisca Lake. This hamlet is located at 16.3 kilometres (10.1 mi) (in a straight line) north of the village of Chapais. The top of the Opemisca sheep (541 metres (1,775 ft)) is located at 4.8 kilometres (3.0 mi) northwest of the village Oujé-Bougoumou and at 1.2 kilometres (0.75 mi) north-east of the northwestern part of the lake. Several marsh areas surround Lake Opémisca, particularly on the north side.

Opémisca Lake is located at 31.3 kilometres (19.4 mi) west of Chibougamau Lake and is connected on the west side by the "Eastern Passage" (length: 3.5 kilometres (2.2 mi)) at Michwacho Lake. The mouth of Lake Opémisca is located at:

- 7.2 kilometres (4.5 mi) Southeast of the mouth of Michwacho Lake;
- 61.1 kilometres (38.0 mi) south-west of downtown Chibougamau;
- 14.2 kilometres (8.8 mi) north-east of the village center of Chapais;
- 61.6 kilometres (38.3 mi) north-east of the mouth of the Obatogamau River (confluence with the Opawica River);
- 131.3 kilometres (81.6 mi) northeast of the mouth of Goéland Lake (Waswanipi River);
- 332 kilometres (206 mi) Southeast of the mouth of the Nottaway River.

The main hydrographic slopes near "Lake Opémisca" are:

- North side: Opémisca River, Chibougamau River, Brock River (Chibougamau River), Crinkle Creek;
- East side: Barlow Lake, Scott Lake, Obatogamau River;
- South side: Pringer Creek, Obatogamau River, Presqu'île Lake (Nord-du-Québec);
- West side: Michwacho Lake, Deception Creek, Chibougamau River.

From the mouth of Opémisca Lake, the current flows down the Chibougamau River on the southwest to its confluence with the Waswanipi River. The latter generally flows west, crossing in particular Lake Waswanipi and Goéland Lake (Waswanipi River).

== Toponymy ==
The 1904 Fifth Report of the Geographic Board of Canada, published in Ottawa in 1905, states on page 46: "Opamiska. See Opemiska. Opemiska; Lake, West of Chibougamau Lake, Abitibi District, Que". The report of the "Commission Geography of Canada" of 1911 designates this water body "Opémisca". This toponymic designation also applies to the mountain (elevation: 541 metres (1,775 ft)) located north of the lake. According to information obtained from the local band council, this would be a Cree word meaning "difficult to extirpate". In Innu, the name Opémisca, which is also spelled Opamiska, would mean "it is a bit high".

On the other hand, the term "pamiska" in Algonquin means "a place where the lake's edges are dotted with aquatic weeds"; the northern sector adjoining the lake is indeed marshy.

This lake has also been known in the past as the Sandy Straw Lake, a variant no doubt inspired by Henry O'Sullivan's 1901 relationship with his expedition to the area. The explorer proposes the translation of Sandy Beach Lake for the lake it presents in the form of Lake Opamiska. There is also a ski touring club.

The toponym "Lake Opémisca" was made official on December 5, 1968 by the Commission de toponymie du Québec during its creation.

== See also ==
- James Bay
- Rupert Bay
- Nottaway River, a watercourse
- Matagami Lake, a body of water
- Waswanipi River, a watercourse
- Goéland Lake (Waswanipi River), a body of water
- Chibougamau River, a watercourse
- Opémisca River, a watercourse
- Barlow River, a watercourse
- Eeyou Istchee Baie-James, a municipality
- List of lakes in Canada
