= Brock River (Chibougamau River) =

Brock
- Watershed of Nottaway River

Location
- Country: Canada
- Province: Quebec
- Region: Nord-du-Québec

Physical characteristics
- Source: Brock Lake
  - location: Eeyou Istchee Baie-James, Nord-du-Québec, Quebec
  - coordinates: 50°30′52″N 74°23′12″W
  - elevation: 400 m (1,300 ft)
- Mouth: Chibougamau River
  - location: Eeyou Istchee Baie-James, Nord-du-Québec, Quebec
  - coordinates: 50°00′47″N 75°04′54″W
  - elevation: 336 m (1,102 ft)
- Length: 104.6 km (65.0 mi)

Basin features
- Tributaries
  - left: (in upstream order); Crinkle creek; discharge of Lac Claire; discharge of Lac Claude; Blaiklock River; Maaskitkuu creek; Chinsuu Saakahiikanu creek
  - right: (in upstream order); Noir creek; Brock River West; Brock River North; Kaakitchatsekaasich Creek

The Brock River is a tributary of the Chibougamau River, flowing in Eeyou Istchee Baie-James, in the administrative region of Nord-du-Québec, in the province of Quebec, in Canada. The course of the river crosses successively (from the upstream) the cantons of Beaulieu, Cherisy, La Rochette, Rageot, Livillier, La Touche and Opémisca.

The hydrographic slope of the "Brock River" is accessible by a forest road that cuts across the northern part of the river, at 1.7 kilometres (1.1 mi) south of Villebois Lake. This road comes from the South where it separates from the route 113 which connects Lebel-sur-Quévillon to Chibougamau and passes to the South of the lake.

The surface of the "Brock River" is usually frozen from early November to mid-May, however, safe ice movement is generally from mid-November to mid-April.

== Geography ==
The main hydrographic slopes adjacent to the "Brock River" are:
- North side: Saint-Urcisse River, Brock River West, Brock River North, Mistassini Lake, De Maures River;
- East side: Chibougamau River, Blaiklock River, Mistassini Lake, Chibougamau Lake, Barlow River, Pipounichouane River;
- South side: Opémisca Lake, Opémisca River, Chibougamau River, Blaiklock River;
- West side: Chibougamau River, Mildred River, Omo River, Maicasagi River.

The "Brock River" originates at the mouth of Brock Lake (length: 6.7 kilometres (4.2 mi) altitude: 400 metres (1,300 ft)) in the Township of Beaulieu. This source is located at:

- 23.4 kilometres (14.5 mi) west of Mistassini Lake;
- 27.8 kilometres (17.3 mi) North of the mouth of Opataca Lake;
- 51.0 kilometres (31.7 mi) Northeast of Assinica Lake;
- 74.7 kilometres (46.4 mi) Northeast of the mouth of the Brock River (confluence with the Chibougamau River);
- 145.7 kilometres (90.5 mi) Northeast of the mouth of the Chibougamau River (confluence with the Opawica River);
- 195.6 kilometres (121.5 mi) Northeast of the mouth of Goéland Lake (Waswanipi River);
- 87.5 kilometres (54.4 mi) North of the village center of Chapais
- 66.6 kilometres (41.4 mi) Northwest of downtown Chibougamau;
- 330.8 kilometres (205.5 mi) East of the mouth of the Nottaway River.

From its source, the "Brock River" flows over 104.6 kilometres (65.0 mi) according to the following segments:

Upper Brock River (segment of 37.7 kilometres (23.4 mi))

- 5.0 kilometres (3.1 mi) south across Daubenton Lake (length: 2.0 kilometres (1.2 mi); altitude: 394 metres (1,293 ft)) on its full length, then the Villebois Lake (length: 2.4 kilometres (1.5 mi); altitude: 390 metres (1,280 ft)) on its full length;
- 10.0 kilometres (6.2 mi) south to the mouth of the lake ? (length: 7.4 kilometres (4.6 mi); altitude: 388 metres (1,273 ft)) that current flows through on 7.0 kilometres (4.3 mi);
- 7.6 kilometres (4.7 mi) south, then south-east to the mouth of Lemieux Lake (length: 4.0 kilometres (2.5 mi); altitude: 375 metres (1,230 ft)) that the current flows south-east on 2.0 kilometres (1.2 mi);
- 7.1 kilometres (4.4 mi) south by collecting Chinsu Creek Saakahiikanu (coming from the Northeast), Maaskitkuu Creek (coming from the East), crossing the Kaaweinaupetchuu Rapids and passing on the west side of the Hill Kaamischekokaamasuu, to the southern limit of the Assinica Wildlife Sanctuary;
- 8.0 kilometres (5.0 mi) south to the Kaamitchipeich Rapids where it collects the waters of the dump (coming from the Southeast) of Lake Claude, then the South-West to the confluence of the Blaiklock River (from the South);

Lower Brock River (segment of 66.9 kilometres (41.6 mi))

- 2.3 kilometres (1.4 mi) westerly to the confluence of the Kaakitchatsekaasich Creek (coming from the Northeast);
- 34.4 kilometres (21.4 mi) relatively straight West to the confluence of the Brock River North (coming from the Northeast);
- 5.6 kilometres (3.5 mi) westerly passing North of a mountain whose summit reaches 452 metres (1,483 ft) to the confluence of the Brock River West (coming from Northwest);
- 5.8 kilometres (3.6 mi) southerly, passing from the west side of the same mountain, to Noire Creek (coming from the Southwest) which drains the "Lac à l'Eau Noire" (English: lake of Black Water);
- 13.4 kilometres (8.3 mi) southwesterly to Crinkle Creek (from the Northeast);
- 5.4 kilometres (3.4 mi) southwesterly to mouth.

The "Brock River" flows on the North shore of the Chibougamau River, at 6.9 kilometres (4.3 mi) downstream from the mouth of Michwacho Lake in the township of Ospémisca. From this mouth, the current flows southwesterly along the Chibougamau River to the East shore of Goéland Lake (Waswanipi River). The latter is crossed to the Northwest by the Waswanipi River which is a tributary of Matagami Lake.

The mouth of the "Brock River" located at:

- 10.8 kilometres (6.7 mi) Northwest of Opémisca Lake;
- 73.1 kilometres (45.4 mi) Northeast of the mouth of the Chibougamau River (confluence with the Opawica River);
- 133.1 kilometres (82.7 mi) Northeast of the mouth of Goéland Lake (Waswanipi River);
- 31 kilometres (19 mi) Northwest of the village center of Chapais;
- 52 kilometres (32 mi) West of downtown Chibougamau.

== Toponymy ==
This hydronym evokes the memory of Reginald W. Brock, who, at the end of the 1896 geological exploration campaign, was assistant to Dr. Robert Bell of the Geological Survey of Canada, made a rapid geological reconnaissance of the road between the lakes Waswanipi and Mistassini through the rivers Waswanipi, Chibougamau and Barlow River and the Lake Waskonichi. Reginald W. Brock, Director of the Geological Survey of Canada, provided the work maps and survey instruments for the 1910 Chibougamau Geological Survey (Quebec) expedition.

The toponym "Brock River" was formalized on December 5, 1968, at the Commission de toponymie du Québec, i.e. at the creation of this commission

== See also ==
- James Bay
- Rupert Bay
- Nottaway River, a watercourse
- Matagami Lake, a body of water
- Waswanipi River, a watercourse
- Goéland Lake (Waswanipi River), a body of water
- Lake Waswanipi, a body of water
- Chibougamau River, a watercourse
- Brock River West, a watercourse
- Brock River North, a watercourse
- Kaakitchatsekaasich Creek, a watercourse
- Blaiklock River, a watercourse
- Assinica Wildlife Sanctuary
- List of rivers of Quebec
