= Macoustigane River =

Macoustigane
- Watershed of Nottaway River

Location
- Country: Canada
- Province: Quebec
- Region: Nord-du-Québec

Physical characteristics
- Source: Unidentified lake
  - location: Senneterre, Nord-du-Québec, Quebec
  - coordinates: 48°42′09″N 76°19′59″W
  - elevation: 462 m (1,516 ft)
- Mouth: Wetetnagami River
  - location: Senneterre, Nord-du-Québec, Quebec
  - coordinates: 48°48′25″N 76°17′48″W
  - elevation: 368 m (1,207 ft)
- Length: 20.7 km (12.9 mi)

The Macoustigane River is a tributary of the east bank of the Wetetnagami River flowing into Senneterre in the RCM of La Vallée-de-l'Or Regional County Municipality, in the administrative region of Abitibi-Témiscamingue, in Quebec, in Canada.

This river successively crosses the townships of Charette and Adhémar.

Forestry is the main economic activity of the sector; recreational tourism, second, particularly thanks to the Lake Wetetnagami Biodiversity Reserve. The Macoustigane River Valley is served by the forest road (east-west) passing south of Wetetnagami Lake in the Wetetnagami Lake Biodiversity Reserve.

The surface of the Macoustigane River is usually frozen from early November to mid-May, however, safe ice movement is generally from mid-November to mid-April.

== Geography ==
The surrounding hydrographic slopes of the Macoustigane River are:
- north side: Wetetnagami River, Wetetnagami Lake, Saint-Père River;
- east side: Macho River, Cherrier Lake, Saint-Cyr Lake, Pascagama River;
- south side: Achepabanca River, Achepabanca River Northeast, Berthelot River, Mégiscane River;
- west side: Wetetnagami River, O'Sullivan River.

The Macoustigane River originates in Senneterre, at the mouth of an unidentified lake (length: 1.0 kilometre (0.62 mi); maximum width: 0.5 kilometres (0.31 mi); altitude: 462 metres (1,516 ft)). This lake is located at the foot of a mountain whose summit reaches 552 metres (1,811 ft) and which has a 76-meter cliff bounding the southeast of the lake.

The mouth of this head lake is located at:

- 12.0 kilometres (7.5 mi) South of the mouth of the Macoustigane River;
- 68.1 kilometres (42.3 mi) south of the mouth of the Wetetnagami River;

South of the mouth of the Nicobi River;

- 112.9 kilometres (70.2 mi) south of the confluence of the Opawica River and the Chibougamau River;
- 61.8 kilometres (38.4 mi) south-east of the village center of Lebel-sur-Quévillon;
- 75.9 kilometres (47.2 mi) north-east of Senneterre. From the mouth of the head lake, the Macoustigane River flows over 20.7 kilometres (12.9 mi) according to the following segments:
- 3.6 kilometres (2.2 mi) southeasterly, crossing three small lakes in a confined valley, to the southwestern shore of an unidentified lake;
- 3.9 kilometres (2.4 mi) to the north, crossing five small lakes (elevation: 407 metres (1,335 ft)), then branching east to the southwest shore of a bay of Macoustigane Lake;
- 8.8 kilometres (5.5 mi) North in Moquin township, crossing the Macoustigane Lake (maximum width: 1.5 kilometres (0.93 mi); altitude: 404 metres (1,325 ft) on its full length, to its mouth;
- 4.4 kilometres (2.7 mi) northwesterly to its confluence with the Wetetnagami River.

The Macoustigane River empties onto the east bank of the Wetetnagami River, which generally flows northward across Wetetnagami Lake before spilling into Nicobi Lake. The latter is the head lake of the Nicobi River. The latter flows north to discharge on the southeast bank of the Opawica River. The latter goes back to the north until it meets the Chibougamau River; this confluence is the source of the Waswanipi River. The course flows westward through the northern portion of Lake Waswanipi, Goéland Lake and Olga Lake, before pouring into the Matagami Lake which in turn flows into the Nottaway River, a tributary of Rupert Bay (James Bay).

The confluence of the Macoustigane River with the Wetetnagami River is located at:

- 55.7 kilometres (34.6 mi) south of the mouth of the Wetetnagami River;
- 77.1 kilometres (47.9 mi) South of the mouth of the Nicobi River;
- 100.8 kilometres (62.6 mi) south of the mouth of the Opawica River (confluence with the Chibougamau River);
- 159 kilometres (99 mi) north-east of downtown Parent, Quebec;
- 58 kilometres (36 mi) east of the village center of Lebel-sur-Quévillon;
- 74.9 kilometres (46.5 mi) west of a bay of Gouin Reservoir.

== Toponymy ==
At different times in history, this territory has been occupied by the Attikameks, Algonquins and Cree. Of Native origin of the Algonquin nation, the term "Macoustigane" means "head of the bear".

The toponym "Rivière Macoustigane" was made official on December 5, 1968, at the Commission de toponymie du Québec, when it was created.

== See also ==
- James Bay
- Rupert Bay
- Nottaway River, a watercourse
- Matagami Lake, a body of water
- Waswanipi River, a watercourse
- Opawica River, a watercourse
- Nicobi River, a watercourse
- Nicobi Lake, a body of water
- Wetetnagami River, a watercourse
- Wetetnagami Lake, a body of water
- Macoustigane Lake, a body of water
- Wetetnagami Lake Biodiversity Reserve
- Senneterre
- List of rivers of Quebec
