= Dazemard River =

Dazemard French: Rivière au Panache
- Watershed of Nottaway River

Location
- Country: Canada
- Province: Quebec
- Region: Abitibi-Témiscamingue

Physical characteristics
- Source: Forested creek
  - location: Senneterre, Abitibi-Témiscamingue, Quebec
  - coordinates: 48°56′05″N 76°00′51″W
  - elevation: 391 m (1,283 ft)
- Mouth: Wetetnagami River
  - location: Senneterre, Abitibi-Témiscamingue, Quebec
  - coordinates: 49°04′56″N 76°08′14″W
  - elevation: 353 m (1,158 ft)
- Length: 30.0 km (18.6 mi)

The Dazemard River is a tributary of the east bank of the Wetetnagami River flowing into Senneterre in the RCM of La Vallée-de-l'Or Regional County Municipality, in the administrative region of Abitibi-Témiscamingue, in Quebec, in Canada.

This river crosses successively (from the upstream) the cantons of Souart, Moquin and Effiat.

Forestry is the main economic activity of the sector; recreational tourism activities, second.

The Dazemard River Valley is served by the R1015 Forest Road (North-South direction) passing west of the Wetetnagami River Valley; this road joins the road R1051 towards the North (East-West direction).

The surface of the Dazemard River is usually frozen from early November to mid-May, however, safe ice circulation is generally from mid-November to mid-April.

== Geography ==
The adjacent hydrographic slopes of the Dazemard River are:
- north side: Panache River, Muy River, Nicobi Lake, Nicobi River, Opawica River;
- east side: Panache River, Saint-Cyr River, Doda Lake, Corriveau Creek, Macho River;
- south side: Macho River, Corriveau Creek, Wetetnagami River, Saint-Père River;
- west side: O'Sullivan River, Wetetnagami River, Wetetnagami Lake.

The Dazemard River originates at the mouth of Betty Lake (length: 3.2 kilometres (2.0 mi) altitude: 391 metres (1,283 ft)) in the township of Souart, in Senneterre at:

- 18.8 kilometres (11.7 mi) south-east of the mouth of the Dazemard River;
- 39.4 kilometres (24.5 mi) south-east of the mouth of the Wetetnagami River;
- 7.3 kilometres (4.5 mi) west of Maseres Lake (which is crossed to the south by the Macho River;
- 14.1 kilometres (8.8 mi) northeast of Wetetnagami Lake.

From its source, the Dazemard River flows over 30.0 kilometres (18.6 mi) according to the following segments:

- 8.5 kilometres (5.3 mi) to the north in the canton of Souart, more or less along the boundary of the townships of Souart and Moquin and crossing the Altherr Lake (length: 2.6 kilometres (1.6 mi) altitude: 389 metres (1,276 ft)) to the southeastern shore of Lake Albert;
- 3.3 kilometres (2.1 mi) northwesterly across Lake Albert (elevation: 388 metres (1,273 ft)) on its full length, which straddles the townships of Souart and Moquin, up to at its mouth;
- 8.0 kilometres (5.0 mi) north in Moquin Township and entering Effiat Township to the mouth of an unidentified lake (length: 1.6 kilometres (0.99 mi); altitude: 383 metres (1,257 ft)) that the current flows through its full length;
- 10.2 kilometres (6.3 mi) northwesterly winding to its mouth.

The Dazemard River flows into a river bend on the east bank of the Wetetnagami River flowing north and discharging into Nicobi Lake. The latter is the head lake of the Nicobi River. The latter flows north to discharge on the southeast bank of the Opawica River. The latter goes back to the north until it meets the Chibougamau River; this confluence is the source of the Waswanipi River. The course flows westward through the northern portion of lake Waswanipi, Goéland Lake and Olga Lake, before pouring into the Matagami Lake which in turn flows into the Nottaway River, a tributary of Rupert Bay (James Bay).

The confluence of the Dazemard River with the Wetetnagami Lake is located at:

- 23.2 kilometres (14.4 mi) south of the mouth of the Wetetnagami River (confluence with Nicobi Lake);
- 44.3 kilometres (27.5 mi) south of the mouth of the Nicobi River (confluence with the Opawica River);
- 68.9 kilometres (42.8 mi) south of the mouth of the Opawica River (confluence with the Chibougamau River);
- 111.4 kilometres (69.2 mi) north-east of downtown Senneterre;
- 62.1 kilometres (38.6 mi) north-east of the village center of Lebel-sur-Quévillon;
- 90.2 kilometres (56.0 mi) west of a bay on the north shore of Gouin Reservoir.

== Toponymy ==
At different times in history, this territory has been occupied by the Attikameks, Algonquins and Cree. The term "Dazemard" is a family name of French origin.

The toponym "Dazemard River" was made official on December 5, 1968, at the Commission de toponymie du Québec, when it was created.

== See also ==
- James Bay
- Rupert Bay
- Nottaway River, a watercourse
- Matagami Lake, a body of water
- Waswanipi River, a watercourse
- Opawica River, a watercourse
- Nicobi River, a watercourse
- Nicobi Lake, a body of water
- Wetetnagami River, a watercourse
- Wetetnagami Lake, a body of water
- Senneterre, a city
- List of rivers of Quebec
