= Little Bachelor River =

Little Bachelor
- Watershed of Nottaway River

Location
- Country: Canada
- Province: Quebec
- Region: Nord-du-Québec

Physical characteristics
- Source: Forested creek
  - location: Eeyou Istchee James Bay (municipality), Nord-du-Québec, Quebec
  - coordinates: 49°25′24″N 76°23′10″W
  - elevation: 314 m (1,030 ft)
- Mouth: Bachelor River
  - location: Eeyou Istchee James Bay (municipality), Nord-du-Québec, Quebec
  - coordinates: 49°28′42″N 76°16′37″W
  - elevation: 272 m (892 ft)
- Length: 12.0 km (7.5 mi)

Little Bachelor River is a tributary of the south shore of the Bachelor River flowing into Eeyou Istchee James Bay (municipality), in Jamésie, in the administrative region of Nord-du-Québec, in Quebec, Canada.

This river successively crosses the townships of Benoit and Nelligan.

Forestry is the main economic activity of the sector; recreational tourism activities, second.

The Little Bachelor River valley is served by route 113 linking Lebel-sur-Quévillon and Chibougamau, whose route is more or less parallel to River. In addition, this sub-surface is served by the Canadian National Railway, which passes to the North-West.

The surface of the Little Bachelor River is usually frozen from early November to mid-May, however, safe ice circulation is generally from mid-November to mid-April.

== Geography ==
The adjacent hydrographic slopes of Little Bachelor River are:
- north side: Bachelor River, Waswanipi River, Taylor Creek;
- east side: Bachelor River, Auger Creek, Opawica River, Wachigabau Lake, Opawica Lake;
- south side: Auger Creek, Pusticamica Lake, Wetetnagami River, Périgny River;
- west side: Lake Waswanipi, O'Sullivan River, Iserhoff River.

The Little Bachelor River begins in Eeyou Istchee James Bay (municipality), a forest stream (altitude: 314 metres (1,030 ft)) in the Township of Benoit. This source is located at:

- 4.9 kilometres (3.0 mi) northwest of Pusticamica Lake;
- 4.4 kilometres (2.7 mi) north-east of the O'Sullivan River;
- 11.0 kilometres (6.8 mi) south-west of the mouth of Little Bachelor River;
- 27.7 kilometres (17.2 mi) south-east of the mouth of Lake Waswanipi;
- 58.5 kilometres (36.4 mi) north-east of the village center of Lebel-sur-Quévillon;
- 61.0 kilometres (37.9 mi) south-east of the mouth of Goéland Lake;
- 96.8 kilometres (60.1 mi) east of downtown Matagami;

From the mouth of the head lake, the Little Bachelor River flows entirely into forest area on 12.0 kilometres (7.5 mi) according to the following segments:

- 5.5 kilometres (3.4 mi) northeasterly in the township of Benoit, to the southern limit of the township of Nelligan;
- 6.5 kilometres (4.0 mi) northeasterly in the Nelligan Township in a swamp zone to its mouth.

The Little Bachelor River flows on the south shore of the Bachelor River. From there, it generally flows northwest to its confluence with the Lake Waswanipi, the northern portion of which is crossed to the west by the Waswanipi River. The course flows westward and crosses successively the northern part of Lake Waswanipi, Goéland Lake and Olga Lake, before discharging into Matagami Lake which in turn flows into the Nottaway River, a tributary of Rupert Bay James Bay).

The confluence of the Little Bachelor River with the Bachelor River is located at:

- 4.0 kilometres (2.5 mi) east of the mouth of the Bachelor River (confluence with Lake Waswanipi);
- 61.8 kilometres (38.4 mi) northeast of the mouth of Goéland Lake;
- 275 kilometres (171 mi) south-east of the mouth of the Nottaway River (confluence with Rupert Bay);
- 102 kilometres (63 mi) east of downtown Matagami;
- 69.0 kilometres (42.9 mi) north-east of the village center of Lebel-sur-Quévillon;
- 120 kilometres (75 mi) northwest of Gouin Reservoir.

== Toponymy ==
Of English origin, the term "Bachelor" refers to an unmarried single man. This English term is the title of any person of any sex or marital status who holds a bachelor's degree.

The toponym "Little Bachelor River" was formalized on November 1, 1988, at the Commission de toponymie du Québec, when it was created.

== See also ==
- James Bay
- Rupert Bay
- Nottaway River, a watercourse
- Lake Matagami, a body of water
- Waswanipi River, a watercourse
- Lake Waswanipi, a body of water
- Bachelor River, a watercourse
- Eeyou Istchee James Bay (municipality)
- List of rivers of Quebec
