= Lichen Lake (Opawica River) =

Lake in Quebec, Canada

- Watershed of Nottaway River

- Location within Quebec
- Location: Eeyou Istchee Baie-James (municipality)
- Coordinates: 49°28′17″N 75°48′21″W
- Primary inflows: Opawica River (Lessard Lake); La Ronde creek; Margry creek; Nicobi River; discharge of Céré Lake
- Primary outflows: Opawica River (Wachigabau Lake)
- Basin countries: Canada
- Max. length: 30.0 kilometres (18.6 mi)
- Max. width: 1.9 kilometres (1.2 mi)
- Surface elevation: 302 metres (991 ft)

Lichen Lake is a freshwater body crossed by the Opawica River in the southeastern part of Eeyou Istchee James Bay (Municipality), in Jamésie, in the administrative region of Nord-du-Québec, in the province of Quebec, in Canada. This lake extends into the townships of La Ronde, Marin, Margry, Lespérance, Lesueur and Le Tac.

Forestry is the main economic activity of the sector. Recreational tourism activities come second with a navigable water body of 30.0 kilometres (18.6 mi) across Lake Lichen, plus an extension of 315 kilometres (196 mi) with the Wachigabau Lake. Lake Lichen is formed by an enlargement of the Opawica River and integrates into Wachigabau Lake which includes a dam at its mouth.

The northwestern portion of the Lichen Lake hydrographic slope is accessible through the forest road route 113 passing north-west of Opawica Lake and connecting Chibougamau to Lebel-sur-Quévillon. The north side of the lake is accessible via the Canadian National Railway which passes over a strip of land between Opawica Lake and Wachigabau Lake.

The surface of Lichen Lake is usually frozen from early November to mid-May, however, safe ice movement is generally from mid-November to mid-April.

== Geography ==
Formed by a widening of the Opawica River, this lake has a length of 30.0 kilometres (18.6 mi), a maximum width of 1.9 kilometres (1.2 mi) and an altitude of 302 metres (991 ft). The shape of the lake looks like a big Z spilled and lying on its side. The southwestern part of the lake has an extension of 7.7 kilometres (4.8 mi) where the Céré Lake outlet discharges.

Lichen Lake is mainly fed by:

- the Opawica River (coming from the Northeast), which is the outlet of Lessard Lake which is at 2 metres (6 ft 7 in) higher, and
- the Nicobi River (coming from the South).

The Opawica River from the East first crosses the Lichen Lakes and Wachigabau before discharging into Opawica Lake via two entry points which are located at each end of Gull Island (length: 5.1 kilometres (3.2 mi); width: 1.5 kilometres (0.93 mi)). This island and the two peninsulas (one extending westward on 3.3 kilometres (2.1 mi) from the east shore, and the other from the west stretching on 6.2 kilometres (3.9 mi)) form a strip of land of 14.6 kilometres (9.1 mi) in length that runs the full length of the Canadian National railway.

The mouth of this lake Lichen is located north of the western part of the lake, in the canton of Lespérance, that is to say:

- 15.3 kilometres (9.5 mi) south-west of the mouth of Wachigabau Lake;
- 25.6 kilometres (15.9 mi) South of the mouth of the Opawica River;
- 26.8 kilometres (16.7 mi) south-east of the village center of Waswanipi;
- 81.2 kilometres (50.5 mi) southeast of the mouth of Goéland Lake (Waswanipi River);
- 293 kilometres (182 mi) south-east of the mouth of the Nottaway River;
- 125 kilometres (78 mi) east of downtown Matagami;
- 127 kilometres (79 mi) south-west of downtown Chibougamau.

The main hydrographic slopes near Lake Lichen are:

- North side: Wachigabau Lake, Opawica Lake, Opawica River, Chibougamau River, Waswanipi River;
- East side: Opawica River, Germain Creek, Germain Lake, Lessard Lake, Doda Lake;
- South side: Margry Creek, Margry Lake, Nicobi River, Nicobi Lake, Pierrefonds River;
- West side: Wachigabau Lake, Auger Creek, Bachelor River, Lake Waswanipi, Pusticamica Lake.

From the dam at the mouth of Opawica Lake, the course of the Opawica River flows over 14 kilometres (8.7 mi) first northeasterly to an elbow river, then northwest to its confluence with the Chibougamau River. This confluence of these two rivers becomes the head of the Waswanipi River.

== Toponymy ==
Lichen is a plant material growing in northern or semi-northern environments. This plant is popular with large mammals (including caribou) is resistant despite poor weather conditions. Plant names are often used in North America.

The toponym "Lac Lichen" was made official on December 5, 1968 by the Commission de toponymie du Québec.

== See also ==
- Nottaway River, a watercourse
- Matagami Lake, a body of water
- Waswanipi River, a watercourse
- Goéland Lake (Waswanipi River), a body of water
- Opawica River, a watercourse
- Eeyou Istchee Baie-James (municipality), a municipality
- List of lakes in Canada
