= Muy River =

Muy
- Watershed of Nottaway River

Location
- Country: Canada
- Province: Quebec
- Region: Nord-du-Québec

Physical characteristics
- Source: Forested creek
  - location: Eeyou Istchee Baie-James (municipalité), Nord-du-Québec, Quebec
  - coordinates: 47°17′49″N 75°55′03″W
  - elevation: 412 m (1,352 ft)
- Mouth: Wetetnagami River
  - location: Eeyou Istchee Baie-James (municipalité), Nord-du-Québec, Quebec
  - coordinates: 49°10′20″N 76°04′14″W
  - elevation: 353 m (1,158 ft)
- Length: 30.5 km (19.0 mi)

Basin features
- Tributaries
  - left: Discharge of Labrecque Lake

The Muy River is a tributary of the east bank of the Wetetnagami River flowing into the Regional County Municipality (RCM) of Eeyou Istchee James Bay, in the administrative region of Nord-du-Québec, Quebec, Canada.

This river crosses successively (from the upstream) the townships of Prévert, Muy and Effiat.

Forestry is the main economic activity of the sector; recreational tourism activities, second.

The Muy River Valley is served by R1015 Forest Road (North-South) passing west of the Wetetnagami River Valley; this road joins the road R1051 towards the North (East-West direction). Route R1053 (East-West) intersects the lower part of the Muy River.

The surface of the Muy River is usually frozen from early November to mid-May, however, safe ice movement is generally from mid-November to mid-April.

== Geography ==
The surrounding hydrographic slopes of the Muy River are:
- north side: Wetetnagami River, Normandeau Lake, Nicobi Lake, Nicobi River, Opawica River;
- east side: Panache River, Saint-Cyr River, Doda Lake, Corriveau Creek, Macho River;
- south side: Macho River, Corriveau Creek, Wetetnagami River, Saint-Père River;
- west side: O'Sullivan River, Wetetnagami River, Wetetnagami Lake.

The Muy River originates from a forest stream (altitude: 412 metres (1,352 ft)) in the Township of Prévert in Eeyou Istchee Baie-James (municipality) at:

- 21.0 kilometres (13.0 mi) north-east of the mouth of the Muy River;
- 11.3 kilometres (7.0 mi) north-east of the mouth of the Wetetnagami River;
- 14.5 kilometres (9.0 mi) west of Father Lake (which is connected to Doda Lake);
- 52.6 kilometres (32.7 mi) south-east of the mouth of the Opawica River (confluence with the Chibougamau River).

From its source, the Muy River flows over 30.5 kilometres (19.0 mi) according to the following segments:

- 5.2 kilometres (3.2 mi) southwesterly in the Prévert township, to the limit of the township of Muy;
- 16.5 kilometres (10.3 mi) southwesterly in the township of Muy to the outlet (coming from the west) of an unidentified lake;
- 2.6 kilometres (1.6 mi) southerly to the north shore of Muy Lake;
- 2.4 kilometres (1.5 mi) south-north to the mouth of Lake Muy (elevation: 355 metres (1,165 ft)) as the current flows through its full length;
- 3.8 kilometres (2.4 mi) westerly entering Effiat Township and snaking to its mouth.

The Muy River flows to the northeast shore of Wetetnagami Lake which is flared northward by the Wetetnagami River which flows north and discharges into Nicobi Lake. The latter is the head lake of the Nicobi River. The latter flows north to discharge on the southeast bank of the Opawica River. The latter goes back to the north until it meets the Chibougamau River; this confluence is the source of the Waswanipi River. The course runs westward through the northern portion of Lake Waswanipi, Goéland Lake and Olga Lake, before pouring into the Matagami Lake which in turn flows into the Nottaway River, a tributary of Rupert Bay (James Bay).

The lower part of the Muy River flows through the Lake Wetetnagami Biodiversity Reserve. The confluence of the Muy River with the Wetetnagami Lake is located at:

- 15.6 kilometres (9.7 mi) south of the mouth of the Wetetnagami River (confluence with Nicobi Lake);
- 36.6 kilometres (22.7 mi) south of the mouth of the Nicobi River (confluence with the Opawica River);
- 60.6 kilometres (37.7 mi) south of the mouth of the Opawica River (confluence with the Chibougamau River);
- 119.3 kilometres (74.1 mi) north-east of downtown Senneterre;
- 64.5 kilometres (40.1 mi) north-east of the village center of Lebel-sur-Quévillon;
- 101.4 kilometres (63.0 mi) northwest of a bay on the west shore of Gouin Reservoir.

== Toponymy ==
At various times in history, this territory has been occupied by the Attikameks, the Algonquin and the Cree. The term "Muy" is a family name of French origin.

The toponym "rivière Muy" was officialized on December 5, 1968, at the Commission de toponymie du Québec, when it was created.

== See also ==
- James Bay
- Rupert Bay
- Nottaway River, a watercourse
- Matagami Lake, a body of water
- Waswanipi River, a watercourse
- Opawica River, a watercourse
- Nicobi River, a watercourse
- Nicobi Lake, a body of water
- Wetetnagami River, a watercourse
- Wetetnagami Lake, a body of water
- Wetetnagami Lake Biodiversity Reserve
- Eeyou Istchee James Bay (municipality)
- List of rivers of Quebec
