= Saint-Père Lake =

Lake in Senneterre, Quebec, Canada

- Watershed of Nottaway River

- Location within Quebec
- Location: Senneterre, La Vallée-de-l'Or Regional County Municipality
- Coordinates: 48°47′30″N 76°06′26″W
- Type: Natural
- Primary inflows: Few creeks
- Primary outflows: Wetetnagami River
- Basin countries: Canada
- Max. length: 8.4 kilometres (5.2 mi)
- Max. width: 2.3 kilometres (1.4 mi)
- Surface elevation: 401 metres (1,316 ft)

The Saint-Père Lake (English: Holly Father Lake) is a body of water in the eastern part of the Senneterre territory in the La Vallée-de-l'Or Regional County Municipality (RCM), in the administrative region of Abitibi-Témiscamingue, in the province of Quebec, in Canada. This body of water extends entirely in the canton of Saint-Père.

Forestry is the main economic activity of the sector.

The hydrographic slope of Lake Saint-Père is accessible through a forest road that passes north of the lake and another that passes south near Lake Cemetery.

The surface of the Saint-Père River is usually frozen from early November to mid-May, however safe ice circulation is generally from mid-November to mid-April.

== Geography ==
This lake has a length of 8.4 kilometres (5.2 mi) in the shape of a cross whose main trunk is curved to the right.

Lake Saint-Père gets its supplies from a few surrounding lakes.

The mouth of this lake is located on the west shore of a bay in the northern part of the lake, at:

- 12.8 kilometres (8.0 mi) south-east of the mouth of the Saint-Père River;
- 51.9 kilometres (32.2 mi) south of the mouth of the Wetetnagami River;
- 72.4 kilometres (45.0 mi) South of the mouth of the Nicobi River;
- 118.4 kilometres (73.6 mi) south of the confluence of the Opawica River and the Chibougamau River;
- 68.4 kilometres (42.5 mi) south-east of the village center of Lebel-sur-Quévillon;
- 128.6 kilometres (79.9 mi) southeast of the mouth of Goéland Lake (Waswanipi River). Measured distances from the Atlas of Canada (published on the Internet) of the Department of Natural Resources Canada.

The main hydrographic slopes near Lac Saint-Père are:

- North side: Saint-Père River, Wetetnagami River, Dazemard River, Nicobi Lake;
- East side: Macho River, Maseres Lake, Loutres Lake;
- South side: Macho River, Mégiscane River;
- West side: Castonguay Lake, O'Sullivan River, Lecompte River.

== Toponymy ==
The toponym "Lac Saint-Père" was made official on December 5, 1968 by the Commission de toponymie du Québec, i.e. during its creation.

== See also ==
- Nottaway River, a watercourse
- Matagami Lake, a body of water
- Waswanipi River, a watercourse
- Opawica River, a watercourse
- Nicobi River, a watercourse
- Wetetnagami River, a watercourse
- Saint-Père River, a watercourse
- Lac Saint-Père Biodiversity Reserve
- Senneterre, a city
- La Vallée-de-l'Or Regional County Municipality (MRC)
- List of lakes of Canada
