= Wachigabau Lake =

Freshwater lake in Canada

- Watershed of Nottaway River

- Location within Quebec
- Location: Eeyou Istchee Baie-James (municipality)
- Coordinates: 49°33′13″N 75°52′32″W
- Primary inflows: Opawica River (Lichen Lake (Opawica River)); Discharge of Barbie Lake; Discharge of Relique Lake
- Primary outflows: Opawica River (Lichen Lake (Opawica River))
- Basin countries: Canada
- Max. length: 31.5 kilometres (19.6 mi)
- Max. width: 4.3 kilometres (2.7 mi)
- Surface elevation: 302 metres (991 ft)

Wachigabau Lake is a freshwater body crossed by the Opawica River in the southeastern part of Eeyou Istchee James Bay (municipality), in Jamésie, in the administrative region of Nord-du-Québec, in the province of Quebec, in Canada. This lake extends in the cantons of Gand, Lespérance, La Roncière and La Ronde.

Forestry is the main economic activity of the sector. Recreational tourism activities come second with a navigable water body of 30.0 kilometres (18.6 mi) across Lichen Lake (Opawica River), plus an extension of 31.5 kilometres (19.6 mi) with Lake Wachigabau. The Wachigabau Lake is partly formed by an enlargement of the Opawica River because of the dam at its mouth. This lake is integrated with Lichen Lake (Opawica River) located on the south side.

The northwestern portion of the Wachigabau Lake watershed is accessible through the forest road route 113 passing north-west of Opawica Lake and connecting Chibougamau to Lebel-sur-Quévillon. The north side of the lake is accessible via the Canadian National Railway which passes over a strip of land between Lakes Opawica and Wachigabau.

The surface of Wachigabau Lake is usually frozen from early November to mid-May, however, safe ice circulation is generally from mid-November to mid-April.

== Geography ==
Formed by an enlargement of the Opawica River, this lake has a length of 31.5 kilometres (19.6 mi) shaped irregular crescent, a width maximum of 4.3 kilometres (2.7 mi) and an altitude of 302 metres (991 ft). The shape of the lake around the lake is complex because of the presence of three large peninsulas on the south side and two others on the north side. Tush Bay is an extension of 10.7 kilometres (6.6 mi) from the lake to East from the second outfall. The Relique Lake outlet empties into the bottom of this bay. In contrast, the Barbie Lake outlet empties into the bottom of a bay in the western portion of the lake.

The Opawica River from the East first crosses Savard Lakes, Lichen and Wachigabau before spilling into Opawica Lake via two dots. 'Entrance. These are located at each end of the Island of Goéland (length: 5.1 kilometres (3.2 mi); width: 1.5 kilometres (0.93 mi)). This island and the two peninsulas (one extending westward on 3.3 kilometres (2.1 mi) from the east shore, and the other from the west stretching on 6.2 kilometres (3.9 mi)) form a strip of land of 14.6 kilometres (9.1 mi) in length that runs the full length of the Canadian National Railway.

The two outlets of Lake Wachigabau are located in the north in the center of the lake, one in the canton of Lespérance, and the other in the canton of Gand, namely:

- 6.6 kilometres (4.1 mi) south-east of the mouth of Lichen Lake (Opawica River);
- 14.4 kilometres (8.9 mi) South of the mouth of the Opawica River;
- 17.0 kilometres (10.6 mi) south-east of the village center of Waswanipi;
- 81.3 kilometres (50.5 mi) east of the mouth of Goéland Lake (Waswanipi River);
- 289 kilometres (180 mi) south-east of the mouth of the Nottaway River;
- 129 kilometres (80 mi) east of downtown Matagami;
- 115.2 kilometres (71.6 mi) south-west of downtown Chibougamau.

The main hydrographic slopes adjacent to Lake Wachigabau are:

- North side: Opawica Lake, Opawica River, Chibougamau River, Waswanipi River;
- East side: Opawica River, Germain Creek, Germain Lake, Lessard Lake, Doda Lake;
- South side: Lichen Lake (Opawica River), Margry Creek, Margry Lake, Nicobi River, Nicobi Lake, Pierrefonds River;
- West side: Auger Creek, Bachelor River, Waswanipi Lake, Pusticamica Lake.

From the dam at the mouth of Opawica Lake, the course of the Opawica River flows over 14 kilometres (8.7 mi) first northeasterly to an elbow river, then northwest to its confluence with the Chibougamau River. This confluence of these two rivers becomes the head of the Waswanipi River.

== Toponymy ==
The toponym "lac Wachigabau" was formalized on December 5, 1968, by the Commission de toponymie du Québec, i.e. at the creation of this commission.

== See also ==
- Nottaway River, a watercourse
- Matagami Lake, a body of water
- Waswanipi River, a watercourse
- Goéland Lake (Waswanipi River), a body of water
- Opawica River, a watercourse
- Eeyou Istchee Baie-James (municipality), a municipality
- List of lakes of Canada
