= Pierrefonds River =

Pierrefonds
- Watershed of Nottaway River

Location
- Country: Canada
- Province: Quebec
- Region: Nord-du-Québec

Physical characteristics
- Source: Unidentified lake
  - location: Eeyou Istchee James Bay (municipality), Nord-du-Québec, Quebec
  - coordinates: 49°15′13″N 75°39′31″W
  - elevation: 411 m (1,348 ft)
- Mouth: Panache River
  - location: Eeyou Istchee James Bay (municipality), Nord-du-Québec, Quebec
  - coordinates: 49°08′39″N 75°56′33″W
  - elevation: 362 m (1,188 ft)
- Length: 35.4 km (22.0 mi)

The Pierrefonds River (French pronunciation: [pjɛʁfɔ̃]) is a tributary of the north shore of the Panache River flowing into Eeyou Istchee James Bay (municipality), in Jamésie, in the area of Nord-du-Québec, Quebec, Canada.

This river successively crosses the townships of Picquet, Prévert and Carpiquet.

Forestry is the main economic activity of the sector; recreational tourism activities, second.

The Pierrefonds River valley is served by the R1051 forest road (East-West direction).

The surface of the Pierrefonds River is usually frozen from early November to mid-May, however safe ice circulation is generally from mid-November to mid-April.

== Geography ==
The hydrographic slopes near the Pierrefonds River are:
- north side: Opawica River, Nicobi River, Opawica Lake;
- east side: Father's Lake, Doda Lake, Saint-Cyr River, Aigle River (Opawica River);
- south side: Fortier River (Panache River), Macho River, Berthelot River, Cherrier Lake;
- west side: Panache River, Wetetnagami River, Muy River (Wetetnagami River).

The Pierrefonds River originated in Eeyou Istchee James Bay (municipality), at the mouth of an unidentified lake (length: 0.5 kilometres (0.31 mi) altitude: 411 metres (1,348 ft)). This lake is located at 2.3 kilometres (1.4 mi) north-east of the top of a mountain (altitude: 517 metres (1,696 ft)).

This mountain has a slope on the east side, facing Lake Giardini. The mouth of this head lake is located at:

- 23.9 kilometres (14.9 mi) north-east of the mouth of the Pierrefonds River;
- 35.1 kilometres (21.8 mi) north-east of the mouth of the Panache River;
- 30.2 kilometres (18.8 mi) east of the mouth of the Wetetnagami River;
- 29.9 kilometres (18.6 mi) South of the mouth of the Nicobi River;
- 52.3 kilometres (32.5 mi) south-east of the confluence of the Opawica River and the Chibougamau River;
- 99.4 kilometres (61.8 mi) north-east of the village center of Lebel-sur-Quévillon;
- 150.5 kilometres (93.5 mi) north-east of downtown Senneterre.

From the mouth of the head lake, the Pierrefonds River flows over 35.4 kilometres (22.0 mi) according to the following segments:

- 11.6 kilometres (7.2 mi) westerly in the township of Picquet, passing from the south side of a marsh zone to the eastern limit of the township of Prévert;
- 5.3 kilometres (3.3 mi) southwesterly in Prévert township, crossing three small lakes, the altitude of which is 376 metres (1,234 ft), to the dump (coming from the South) from Lac La Forest;
- 15.0 kilometres (9.3 mi) southwesterly, forming a hook to the northwest, to the limit of the township of Carpiquet;
- 3.5 kilometres (2.2 mi) southwesterly to mouth.

The Pierrefonds River flows on the north shore of the Panache River. The latter flows to the east bank of the Wetetnagami River, which generally flows northward across Wetetnagami Lake before spilling into Nicobi Lake. The latter is the head lake of the Nicobi River. The latter flows north to discharge on the southeast bank of the Opawica River. The latter goes back to the north until it meets the Chibougamau River; this confluence is the source of the Waswanipi River. The course runs westward through the northern portion of Lake Waswanipi, Goéland Lake and Olga Lake, before pouring into the Matagami Lake which in turn flows into the Nottaway River, a tributary of Rupert Bay (James Bay).

The confluence of the Pierrefonds River with the Wetetnagami River is located at:

- 4.1 kilometres (2.5 mi) north-east of the mouth of the Panache River;
- 18.3 kilometres (11.4 mi) south-east of the mouth of the Wetetnagami River;
- 34.7 kilometres (21.6 mi) South of the mouth of the Nicobi River;
- 60.3 kilometres (37.5 mi) south of the mouth of the Opawica River (confluence with the Chibougamau River);
- 167.9 kilometres (104.3 mi) northwest of the village center of Parent, Quebec;
- 77 kilometres (48 mi) north-east of the village center of Lebel-sur-Quévillon;
- 72.8 kilometres (45.2 mi) northwest of a bay on the northwestern shore of Gouin Reservoir.

== Toponymy ==
At various times in history, this territory has been occupied by the Attikameks, the Algonquin and the Cree.

The name "Pierrefonds River" was made official on December 5, 1968, at the Commission de toponymie du Québec, when it was created.

== See also ==
- James Bay
- Rupert Bay
- Nottaway River, a watercourse
- Matagami Lake, a body of water
- Waswanipi River, a watercourse
- Opawica River, a watercourse
- Nicobi River, a watercourse
- Nicobi Lake, a body of water
- Wetetnagami River, a watercourse
- Wetetnagami Lake, a body of water
- Pierrefonds Lake, a body of water
- Wetetnagami Lake Biodiversity Reserve.
- Senneterre
- List of rivers of Quebec
