= Fortier River (Panache River tributary) =

Fortier
- Watershed of Nottaway River

Location
- Country: Canada
- Province: Quebec
- Region: Nord-du-Québec

Physical characteristics
- Source: Unidentified lake
  - location: Eeyou Istchee James Bay (municipality), Nord-du-Québec, Quebec
  - coordinates: 49°08′29″N 75°38′50″W
  - elevation: 418 m (1,371 ft)
- Mouth: Panache River
  - location: Eeyou Istchee James Bay (municipality), Nord-du-Québec, Quebec
  - coordinates: 49°05′08″N 75°50′29″W
  - elevation: 380 m (1,250 ft)
- Length: 17.3 km (10.7 mi)

The Fortier River is a tributary of the north shore of the Panache River flowing in Eeyou Istchee James Bay (municipality), in Jamésie, in the administrative region of Nord-du-Québec, Quebec, Canada.

This river successively crosses the townships of Urban and Carpiquet.

Forestry is the main economic activity of the sector; recreational tourism activities, second. The Fortier River valley is served by the R1051 forest road (east-west), which runs north.

The surface of the Fortier River is usually frozen from early November to mid-May, however, safe ice circulation is generally from mid-November to mid-April.

== Geography ==
The surrounding hydrographic slopes of the Fortier River are:
- north side: Picket Lake, Pierrefonds River, Lichen Lake (Opawica River), Opawica River;
- east side: Saint-Cyr River, Aigle River (Opawica River), Hebert River, Lake Hebert, Petit Lac Hebert;
- south side: Panache River, Macho River, Loutres Lake, Masères Lake;
- west side: Panache River, Wetetnagami River.

The Fortier River originated in Eeyou Istchee James Bay (municipality), at the mouth of an unidentified lake (length: 1.5 kilometres (0.93 mi) altitude: 418 metres (1,371 ft)). The mouth of this lake is located at 2.3 kilometres (1.4 mi) south-west of the summit of a mountain (elevation: 502 metres (1,647 ft)) which straddles the boundary of the townships of Picquet and Urban. This mountain has a strong slope on the east side, facing Lake Podeur. The mouth of this head lake is located at:

- 15.5 kilometres (9.6 mi) north-east of the mouth of the Fortier River;

North of the mouth of the Panache River;

- 34.7 kilometres (21.6 mi) southeast of the mouth of the Wetetnagami River;
- 22.5 kilometres (14.0 mi) south-east of the west shore of Lake Hebert;
- 3.3 kilometres (2.1 mi) north-east of Maseres Lake.
- 64.9 kilometres (40.3 mi) south-east of the confluence of the Opawica River and the Chibougamau River;
- 98.3 kilometres (61.1 mi) north-east of the village center of Lebel-sur-Quévillon;
- 144.1 kilometres (89.5 mi) north-east of downtown Senneterre.

From the mouth of the head lake, the Fortier River flows over 17.3 kilometres (10.7 mi) according to the following segments:

- 2.9 kilometres (1.8 mi) southerly in Urban Township, to the point of discharge (from the east) of a small unidentified lake;
- 6.1 kilometres (3.8 mi) westerly across First Fortier Lake (length: 1.7 kilometres (1.1 mi); altitude: 389 metres (1,276 ft)) on its full length; then 2nd Fortier Lake (length: 1.5 kilometres (0.93 mi); altitude: 389 metres (1,276 ft)), to the mouth of the last;
- 4.8 kilometres (3.0 mi) southwesterly in a marsh zone to the limit of the township of Carpiquet;
- 3.5 kilometres (2.2 mi) southwesterly in the Township of Carpiquet to its mouth.

The Fortier River flows on the north shore of the Panache River. The latter flows to the east bank of the Wetetnagami River, which generally flows northward to the Nicobi Lake. The latter is the head lake of the Nicobi River. The latter flows north to discharge on the southeast bank of the Opawica River. The latter goes back to the north until it meets the Chibougamau River; this confluence is the source of the Waswanipi River. The course runs westward through the northern portion of Lake Waswanipi, Goéland Lake and Olga Lake, before pouring into the Matagami Lake which in turn flows into the Nottaway River, a tributary of Rupert Bay (James Bay).

The confluence of the Fortier River with the Wetetnagami River is located at:

- 20.8 kilometres (12.9 mi) east of the mouth of the Panache River;
- 27.9 kilometres (17.3 mi) south-east of the mouth of the Wetetnagami River;
- 41.6 kilometres (25.8 mi) south-east of the mouth of the Nicobi River;
- 67.4 kilometres (41.9 mi) south-east of the mouth of the Opawica River (confluence with the Chibougamau River);
- 157.4 kilometres (97.8 mi) northwest of the village center of Parent, Quebec;
- 83.2 kilometres (51.7 mi) north-east of the village center of Lebel-sur-Quévillon;
- 71.78 kilometres (44.60 mi) northwest of a bay on the west shore of Gouin Reservoir.

== Toponymy ==
At various times in history, this territory has been occupied by the Attikameks, the Algonquins and the Crees. The term "Fortier" is a family name of French origin.

The toponym "Fortier River" was officialized on December 5, 1968, at the Commission de toponymie du Québec, when it was created.

== See also ==
- List of rivers of Quebec
