= Périgny River =

Périgny
- Watershed of Nottaway River

Location
- Country: Canada
- Province: Quebec
- Region: Eeyou Istchee Baie-James (municipality)

Physical characteristics
- Source: Forested and mountain creek
  - location: Senneterre, Quebec, Abitibi-Témiscamingue, Quebec
  - coordinates: 49°00′05″N 76°22′17″W
  - elevation: 381 m (1,250 ft)
- Mouth: O'Sullivan River
  - location: Eeyou Istchee Baie-James (municipality), Nord-du-Québec, Quebec
  - coordinates: 49°10′03″N 76°16′28″W
  - elevation: 319 m (1,047 ft)
- Length: 34.6 km (21.5 mi)

The Périgny River is a tributary of the O'Sullivan River, flowing into the Canadian province of Quebec, Canada, or in the administrative regions of:

- Abitibi-Témiscamingue: regional county municipality (MRC) of La Vallée-de-l'Or Regional County Municipality, in Senneterre, Quebec, in the township of Labrie;
- Nord-du-Québec: regional county municipality (RCM) of Eeyou Istchee Baie-James (municipality), in the townships of Ralleau and Ruette.

The hydrographic slope of the Périgny River is accessible on the R1018 road (North-South direction) passing on the north-west side of the lake. This road is attached to the south at road 113 linking Lebel-sur-Quévillon to Chibougamau.

The surface of the Périgny River is usually frozen from early November to mid-May, however safe ice circulation is generally from mid-November to mid-April.

== Geography ==
The main hydrographic slopes near Périgny river are: North Side: O'Sullivan River, Waswanipi River, Lake Waswanipi;

- East side: Wetetnagami River, Panache River, Fortier River;
- South side: O'Sullivan River, Wetetnagami River, Wetetnagami Lake;
- West side: O'Sullivan River, Wilson River, Kiask River, Bell River.

The Périgny River rises from a forest stream near Highway 1018 (North-South direction) at the foot of the Waswanipi Hills, at:

- 1.9 kilometres (1.2 mi) east of the "Lac de la Ligne";
- 19.6 kilometres (12.2 mi) south of the mouth of the Périgny River (confluence with the O'Sullivan River;
- 52.4 kilometres (32.6 mi) southeast of the mouth of the O'Sullivan River (confluence with Lake Waswanipi;
- 74 kilometres (46 mi) southeast of the mouth of Lake Waswanipi (confluence with the Waswanipi River);
- 102 kilometres (63 mi) southeast of the mouth of Goéland Lake (Waswanipi River);
- 143 kilometres (89 mi) south-east of the mouth of Matagami Lake;
- 318 kilometres (198 mi) south-east of the mouth of the Nottaway River;
- 47 kilometres (29 mi) east of the village center of Lebel-sur-Quévillon.

From its source, the "Périgny River" flows on 34.6 kilometres (21.5 mi) according to the following segments:

- 6.0 kilometres (3.7 mi) to the east (parallel to the boundary of the townships of Ralleau and Labrie) in the township of Labrie, to the southern limit of the township of Ralleau. Note: This segment of river passes between two mountains: top of 489 metres (1,604 ft) on the South side and 458 metres (1,503 ft) on the North side;
- 4.2 kilometres (2.6 mi) northward in the canton of Ralleau, to the south shore of Lac Périgny;
- 3.1 kilometres (1.9 mi) to the North, crossing Lake Périgny (altitude: 354 metres (1,161 ft)) on its full length;
- 2.7 kilometres (1.7 mi) to the north, crossing a lake (length: 1.0 kilometre (0.62 mi); altitude: 349 metres (1,145 ft)) at the end of the segment;
- 2.6 kilometres (1.6 mi) northwesterly to the outlet (from the southwest) of three lakes, including Villejouin Lake;
- 12.9 kilometres (8.0 mi) (or 7.1 kilometres (4.4 mi) in a direct line) north winding to the southern limit of Ruette Township;
- 3.1 kilometres (1.9 mi) (or 1.6 kilometres (0.99 mi) in a direct line) to the north in the canton of Ruette winding to its mouth.

The Périgny River flows into a river bend on the south shore of the [O'Sullivan River], which generally flows northward to the south shore of Lake Waswanipi. From this mouth, the current flows north on the Lake Waswanipi to its mouth. From there, the current flows first north through the Waswanipi River, then west to the east shore of Goéland Lake (Waswanipi River). The current of the latter flows towards the West, to the East shore of Goéland Lake. The latter is crossed to the northwest by the Waswanipi River which is a tributary of Matagami Lake.

The mouth of the Périgny River located at:

- 36.9 kilometres (22.9 mi) southeast of the mouth of the O'Sullivan River;
- 57.4 kilometres (35.7 mi) southeast of the mouth of Lake Waswanipi (confluence with the Waswanipi River);
- 67.8 kilometres (42.1 mi) south-east of a bay south of Goéland Lake (Waswanipi River);
- 89 kilometres (55 mi) south-east of the mouth of Gull Lake (Waswanipi River);
- 101.9 kilometres (63.3 mi) southeast of the mouth of Olga Lake (Waswanipi River);
- 66.4 kilometres (41.3 mi) south of the village center of Waswanipi;
- 53.4 kilometres (33.2 mi) north-east of the village center of Lebel-sur-Quévillon.

== Toponymy ==
The term "Périgny" is a family name of French origin.

The toponym "Périgny River" was formalized on December 5, 1968, at the Commission de toponymie du Québec, i.e. at the creation of this commission

== See also ==
- James Bay
- Rupert Bay
- Nottaway River, a watercourse
- Matagami Lake, a body of water
- Waswanipi River, a watercourse
- Goéland Lake (Waswanipi River), a body of water
- Lake Waswanipi, a body of water
- O'Sullivan River, a watercourse
- List of rivers of Quebec
