= Panache River =

Panache French: Rivière au Panache
- Watershed of Nottaway River

Location
- Country: Canada
- Province: Quebec
- Region: Abitibi-Témiscamingue

Physical characteristics
- Source: Forested creek
  - location: Senneterre, Abitibi-Témiscamingue, Quebec
  - coordinates: 49°08′51″N 76°06′37″W
  - elevation: 407 m (1,335 ft)
- Mouth: Wetetnagami River
  - location: Senneterre, Abitibi-Témiscamingue, Quebec
  - coordinates: 49°08′51″N 76°06′37″W
  - elevation: 349 m (1,145 ft)
- Length: 61.6 km (38.3 mi)

Basin features
- Tributaries
  - left: Corrveau creek
  - right: (upstream) Muy River, Pierrefonds River, Fortier River (Panache River).

The Panache River is a tributary of the east bank of the Wetetnagami River flowing into Senneterre in the La Vallée-de-l'Or Regional County Municipality, in the administrative region of Abitibi-Témiscamingue, in Quebec, in Canada.

This river crosses downstream through the townships of Urban, Carpiquet, Muy and Effiat, successively.

Forestry is the main economic activity of the sector. The second is recreational tourism.

The valley of the Panache River is served by the forest road R1051 (East-West direction) to the North and the forest road R1053 to the South. These two roads also serve the Wetetnagami Lake Biodiversity Reserve which covers the Wetetnagami River Valley.

The surface of the Panache River is usually frozen from early November to mid-May, however safe ice circulation is generally from mid-November to mid-April.

== Geography ==
The hydrographic slopes near the Panache River are:
- north side: Muy River, Fortier River (Panache River), Pierrefonds River, Nicobi Lake, Nicobi River, Opawica River;
- east side: St-Cyr River, Hebert River, Lake Hebert, Doda Lake;
- south side: Dazemard River, Macho River, Corriveau Creek, Wetetnagami River, Saint-Père River;
- west side: O'Sullivan River, Wetetnagami River, Wilson Lake.

The Panache River originates from a forest stream in Senneterre. This spring is located in Senneterre at:

- 31.7 kilometres (19.7 mi) east of the mouth of the Panache River;
- 35.5 kilometres (22.1 mi) southeast of the mouth of the Wetetnagami River;
- 44.4 kilometres (27.6 mi) South of the mouth of the Nicobi River;
- 69.4 kilometres (43.1 mi) south-east of the confluence of the Opawica River and the Chibougamau River;
- 6.2 kilometres (3.9 mi) north-east of the village center of Lebel-sur-Quévillon;
- 124.1 kilometres (77.1 mi) southeast of the mouth of Goéland Lake (Waswanipi River).

From its source, the Panache River flows over 61.6 kilometres (38.3 mi) according to the following segments:

- 9.9 kilometres (6.2 mi) southwesterly in Urban Township, passing near the head of the Macho River (which flows south), to the eastern limit of Township of Carpiquet;
- 11.2 kilometres (7.0 mi) westerly in Urban Township, forming a southerly curve to Corriveau Brook (coming from the South);
- 3.7 kilometres (2.3 mi) north, then north-east, to the confluence of the Fortier River (coming from the East);
- 18.6 kilometres (11.6 mi) northwesterly forming a large northeasterly curve and winding to the confluence of the Pierrefonds River (coming from the northeast);
- 2.6 kilometres (1.6 mi) southwesterly to the eastern limit of the Township of Effiat;
- 15.6 kilometres (9.7 mi) in Effiat Township, first to the northwest, forming a curve to the southwest, touching the boundary of Canton de Muy, then easterly along on the south side the boundary of the townships of Muy and Effiat to its mouth.

The Panache River flows to the northeastern shore of the Wetetnagami River flowing north and discharging into Nicobi Lake. The latter is the head lake of the Nicobi River. The latter flows north to discharge on the southeast bank of the Opawica River. The latter goes back to the north until it meets the Chibougamau River; this confluence is the source of the Waswanipi River. The course flows westward through the northern portion of Lake Waswanipi, Goéland Lake and Olga Lake (Waswanipi River), before pouring into the Matagami Lake which in turn flows into the Nottaway River, a tributary of Rupert Bay (James Bay).

The confluence of the Panache River with the Wetetnagami Lake is located at:

- 15.8 kilometres (9.8 mi) south of the mouth of the Wetetnagami River;
- 36.5 kilometres (22.7 mi) South of the mouth of the Nicobi River;
- 61.1 kilometres (38.0 mi) south of the mouth of the Opawica River (confluence with the Chibougamau River);
- 172.5 kilometres (107.2 mi) north-east of downtown Parent, Quebec;
- 68.4 kilometres (42.5 mi) north-east of the village center of Lebel-sur-Quévillon;
- 87 kilometres (54 mi) northwest of a bay of Gouin Reservoir.

== Toponymy ==
At different times in history, this territory has been occupied by the Atikamekw, Algonquins and Cree. The term "plume" generally refers to the plume (especially that of males) of large deer that are part of the family of ruminant mammals.

The name "Rivière au Panache" was officialized on December 5, 1968, at the Commission de toponymie du Québec, when it was created.

== See also ==
- James Bay
- Rupert Bay
- Nottaway River, a watercourse
- Matagami Lake, a body of water
- Waswanipi River, a watercourse
- Opawica River, a watercourse
- Nicobi River, a watercourse
- Nicobi Lake, a body of water
- Wetetnagami River, a watercourse
- Wetetnagami Lake, a body of water
- Senneterre
- List of rivers of Quebec
