= Pusticamica Lake =

Lake in Quebec, Canada

- Watershed of Nottaway River

- Location within Quebec
- Location: Eeyou Istchee James Bay (municipality)
- Coordinates: 49°21′00″N 76°22′30″W
- Type: Natural
- Primary inflows: O'Sullivan River, ruisseau Malouin.
- Primary outflows: O'Sullivan River.
- Basin countries: Canada
- Max. length: 28.0 kilometres (17.4 mi)
- Max. width: 6.5 kilometres (4.0 mi)
- Average depth: 49 kilometres (30 mi)
- Surface elevation: 288 metres (945 ft)

Pusticamica Lake is a freshwater body of the southeastern portion of Eeyou Istchee James Bay (municipality), in Jamésie, in the administrative region of Nord-du-Québec, in the province of Quebec, in Canada.

This body of water extends into the townships of Duplessis, Mountain, Benoit and Ruette. Forestry is the main economic activity of the sector. Recreational tourism activities come second.

The hydrographic slope of Pusticamica Lake is accessible via route 113 which passes on the northwest side, between the lakes Waswanipi and Pusticamica; in addition, this forest road (North–south direction) from Desmaraisville goes south to serve the Wetetnagami River.

The surface of Pusticamica Lake is usually frozen from early November to mid-May, however, safe ice movement is generally from mid-November to mid-April.

== Geography ==
Lake Pusticamica has a length of 28.0 kilometres (17.4 mi), a maximum width of 6.5 kilometres (4.0 mi) and an altitude of 288 metres (945 ft). This lake has dozens of islands, peninsulas and many bays. A peninsula attached to the south shore stretches out to 11.8 kilometres (7.3 mi) towards the northeast, ie towards the center of the lake. This lake has a large island of 3.3 kilometres (2.1 mi) and another one of 3.1 kilometres (1.9 mi). This lake is mainly fed by the Malouin creek (coming from the East) which drains the Malouin lake and the Auger lake.

The mouth of this lake Pusticamica is located at the bottom of a bay north of the lake, to:

- 7.3 kilometres (4.5 mi) south of the mouth of the O'Sullivan River;
- 29.5 kilometres (18.3 mi) southeast of the mouth of Lake Waswanipi;
- 59.8 kilometres (37.2 mi) southeast of the mouth of Goéland Lake (Waswanipi River);
- 95.5 kilometres (59.3 mi) south-east of downtown Matagami;
- 274 kilometres (170 mi) south-east of the mouth of the Nottaway River;
- 104.7 kilometres (65.1 mi) south-east of the mouth of Matagami Lake;
- 54.2 kilometres (33.7 mi) north-east of the village center of Lebel-sur-Quévillon;
- 137.5 kilometres (85.4 mi) west of Obedjiwan village center.

The main hydrographic slopes near Pusticamica Lake are:

- north side: O'Sullivan River, Lake Waswanipi, Waswanipi River, Bachelor River, Little Bachelor River;
- east side: Nicobi Lake, Opawica Lake, Father Lake (Doda Lake), Hébert Lake (Hébert River);
- south side: O'Sullivan River, Mountain Brook, Wilson Lake;
- west side: Lake Waswanipi, Iserhoff River, O'Sullivan River, Florence River.

== Toponymy ==
Of Algonquin origin, the term "Pusticamica" means "lake of the mountainous countries". Before the Geographical Survey of Canada named this lake in 1916, it was referred to as "Puskitamika".

The toponym "lac Pusticamica" was made official on December 5, 1968, by the Commission de toponymie du Québec, when it was created.

== See also ==
- James Bay
- Nottaway River, a watercourse
- Matagami Lake, a body of water
- Waswanipi River, a watercourse
- Lake Waswanipi, a body of water
- O'Sullivan River, a watercourse
- Eeyou Istchee Baie-James (municipality), a municipality
- List of lakes of Canada
