= Panache =

French word indicating "flamboyance" or "courage"

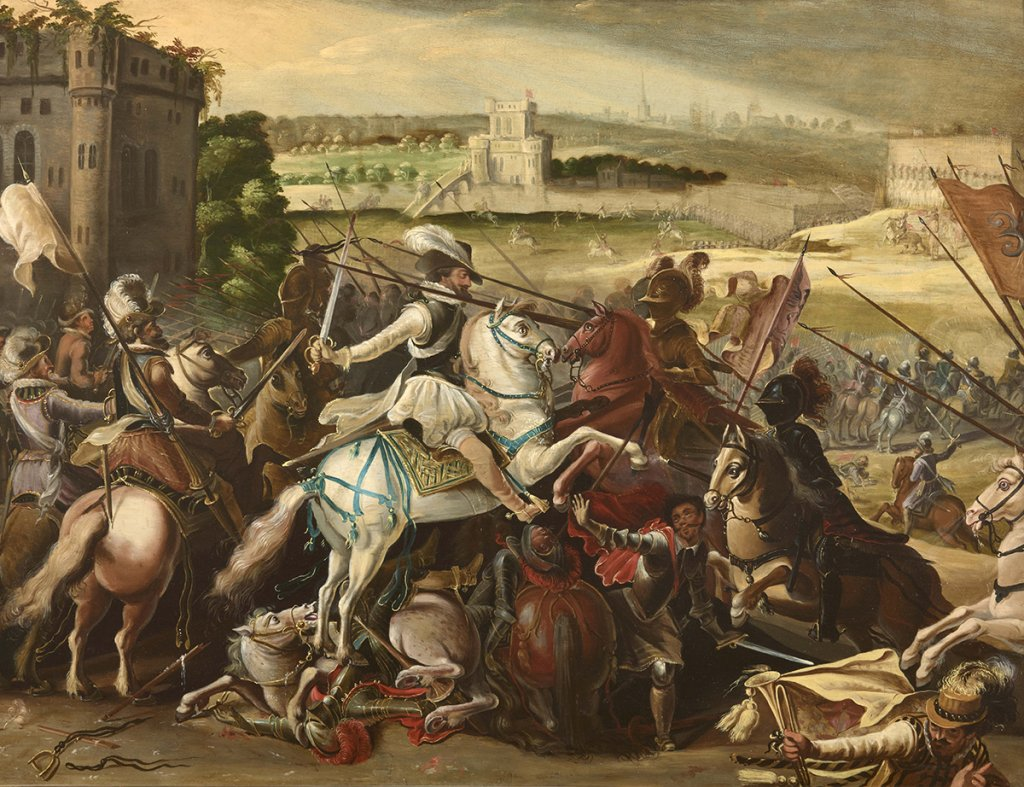
Henry IV of France in battle, wearing white plume

Panache (French pronunciation: [panaʃ]) is a word of French origin that carries the connotation of flamboyant manner and reckless courage, derived from the helmet-plume worn by cavalrymen in the Early Modern period.

In Canadian French, the word panache may also refer to antlers, such as those of a moose or deer. The Panache River is a tributary of the east bank of the Wetetnagami River flowing into Senneterre in the La Vallée-de-l'Or Regional County Municipality, in the administrative region of Abitibi-Témiscamingue, in Quebec, in Canada. Lake Panache is a lake in the Sudbury area of Ontario. Antlers was the English name of Panache, a 2007 documentary film by Canadian director André-Line Beauparlant.

Panache is a loan word that remains in use across English dialects, denoting a style that is confident and flamboyant.
