= Saint-Père River =

Saint-Père
- Watershed of Nottaway River

Location
- Country: Canada
- Province: Quebec
- Region: Abitibi-Témiscamingue

Physical characteristics
- Source: Saint-Père Lake
  - location: Senneterre, Abitibi-Témiscamingue, Quebec
  - coordinates: 48°40′39″N 76°24′21″W
  - elevation: 401 m (1,316 ft)
- Mouth: Wetetnagami River
  - location: Senneterre, Abitibi-Témiscamingue, Quebec
  - coordinates: 48°49′14″N 76°07′44″W
  - elevation: 367 m (1,204 ft)
- Length: 28.8 km (17.9 mi)

Basin features
- Tributaries
  - left: Discharge of Georges-Côté Lake
  - right: Discharge of Jonction Lake

Saint-Père River is a tributary of the east bank of the Wetetnagami River flowing into Senneterre, in the RCM of La Vallée-de-l'Or Regional County Municipality, in the administrative region of Abitibi-Témiscamingue, in Quebec, in Canada.

This river successively crosses the townships of Saint-Père and Moquin. The surface of the Saint-Père River is generally frozen from early December to late April. Forestry is the main economic activity of the sector; recreational tourism activities, second.

The Saint-Père River valley is served by the forest road (East-West direction) passing north of Wetetnagami Lake] and another on the South side passing through the Wetetnagami Lake Biodiversity Reserve.

== Geography ==
The hydrographic slopes near the Saint-Père River are:
- north side: Wetetnagami River, Nicobi Lake, Nicobi River, Opawica River;
- east side: Panache River, Fortier River, Macho River, Maceres Lake;
- south side: Saint-Père Lake, Wetetnagami River, Macho River;
- west side: O'Sullivan River, Wetetnagami River, Wetetnagami Lake.

The Saint-Père River begins in Senneterre, at the mouth of Lake Saint-Père (length: 8.4 kilometres (5.2 mi); maximum width: 2.3 kilometres (1.4 mi); altitude: 401 metres (1,316 ft)).

The mouth of Lake Saint-Père is located in Senneterre at:

- 12.8 kilometres (8.0 mi) south-east of the mouth of the Saint-Père River;
- 51.9 kilometres (32.2 mi) south of the mouth of the Wetetnagami River;
- 81.2 kilometres (50.5 mi) west of Gouin Reservoir;
- 72.4 kilometres (45.0 mi) South of the mouth of the Nicobi River;
- 118.4 kilometres (73.6 mi) south of the confluence of the Opawica River and the Chibougamau River;
- 68.4 kilometres (42.5 mi) south-east of the village center of Lebel-sur-Quévillon;
- 128.6 kilometres (79.9 mi) southeast of the mouth of Goéland Lake (Waswanipi River).

From the mouth of Saint-Père Lake, the Saint-Père River flows over 28.8 kilometres (17.9 mi) according to the following segments:

- 2.6 kilometres (1.6 mi) westerly, to the outlet of a lake (coming from the South);
- 11.0 kilometres (6.8 mi) northerly, forming a westerly curve to the southern boundary of the Township of Moquin;
- 7.5 kilometres (4.7 mi) North in the canton of Moquin, until the discharge (coming from the East) of the “Lac de la Jonction”;
- 7.7 kilometres (4.8 mi) westerly to its confluence with Wetetnagami Lake.

The Saint-Père River flows to the bottom of a small bay on the eastern shore of Wetetnagami Lake which is crossed by the Wetetnagami River; the latter is discharged in the Nicobi Lake. The latter is the head lake of the Nicobi River. The latter flows north to discharge on the southeast bank of the Opawica River. The latter, in turn, goes up north to its confluence with the Chibougamau River; this confluence is the source of the Waswanipi River. The course flows westward through the northern portion of Lake Waswanipi, Goéland Lake (Waswanipi River) and Olga Lake (Waswanipi River), before pouring into the Matagami Lake which in turn flows into the Nottaway River, a tributary of Rupert Bay (James Bay).

The confluence of the Saint-Père River with the Wetetnagami Lake is located at:

- 41.6 kilometres (25.8 mi) south of the mouth of the Wetetnagami River;
- 62.8 kilometres (39.0 mi) South of the mouth of the Nicobi River;
- 86.9 kilometres (54.0 mi) South of the mouth of the Opawica River;
- 96.5 kilometres (60.0 mi) north-east of downtown Parent, Quebec;
- 59.0 kilometres (36.7 mi) east of the village center of Lebel-sur-Quévillon;
- 73.8 kilometres (45.9 mi) west of a bay of Gouin Reservoir.

== Toponymy ==
At various times in history, this territory has been occupied by the Attikameks, the Algonquin and the Cree.

The toponym "Rivière Saint-Père" was officialized on December 5, 1968, at the Commission de toponymie du Québec, when it was created.

== See also ==
- James Bay
- Rupert Bay
- Nottaway River, a watercourse
- Matagami Lake, a body of water
- Waswanipi River, a watercourse
- Opawica River, a watercourse
- Nicobi River, a watercourse
- Nicobi Lake, a body of water
- Wetetnagami River, a watercourse
- Wetetnagami Lake, a body of water
- Senneterre
- List of rivers of Quebec
