= Maricourt Lake =

Lake in Senneterre, Quebec, Canada

- Watershed of Nottaway River

- Location within Quebec
- Location: Senneterre
- Coordinates: 48°37′31″N 76°04′01″W
- Primary inflows: Macho River, Closse River
- Primary outflows: Macho River
- Basin countries: Canada
- Max. length: 11.8 kilometres (7.3 mi)
- Max. width: 2.0 kilometres (1.2 mi)
- Surface area: 6.5 kilometres (4.0 mi)
- Surface elevation: 393 metres (1,289 ft)

Maricourt Lake (French: Lac Maricourt, pronounced [lak maʁikuʁ]) is a freshwater body crossed by the Macho River in the north-eastern part of Senneterre within La Vallée-de-l'Or Regional County Municipality (RCM), in the administrative region of Abitibi-Témiscamingue, in Quebec, Canada.

Lake Maricourt is located entirely in the township of Maricourt. Forestry is the main economic activity of the sector. Recreational tourism activities come second.

The hydrographic slope of Lac Maricourt is accessible through a forest road (East–west direction) that passes on the north side of Maricourt Lake, passing through the Lake Wetetnagami Biodiversity Reserve; in addition, another forest road (East–west direction) serves the southern part of this Reserve and the west side of Lake Maricourt.

The surface of Lac Maricourt is usually frozen from early November to mid-May, however, safe ice circulation is generally from mid-November to mid-April.

== Geography ==
Lake Maricourt has a total length of 11.8 kilometres (7.3 mi) and a maximum width of 2.0 kilometres (1.2 mi). The surface of this lake is an altitude: 393 metres (1,289 ft) like several other bodies of water surrounding. Its long form is an extension of the Macho River flowing towards the southwest to Berthelot Lake (Mégiscane River); the latter being crossed to the Southwest by the Mégiscane River.

The mouth of lake Maricourt is located on the southwest side. From there, the current of Macho River crosses to the South-west a segment of 0.5 kilometres (0.31 mi) which connects to North shore of Berthelot Lake. This mouth of lake Maricourt is at:

- 2.7 kilometres (1.7 mi) north of the mouth of the Macho River;
- 5.7 kilometres (3.5 mi) north-east of the mouth of the Berthelot Lake (Mégiscane River) which is crossed by the Mégiscane River;
- 77.3 kilometres (48.0 mi) north-east of the mouth of the Mégiscane River (confluence with Parent Lake (Abitibi);
- 361.8 kilometres (224.8 mi) south-east of the mouth of the Nottaway River (confluence with Rupert Bay);
- 86.6 kilometres (53.8 mi) north-east of downtown Senneterre;
- 83.8 kilometres (52.1 mi) south-east of the village center of Lebel-sur-Quévillon

== Toponymy ==
The main hydrographic slopes near Lac Maricourt are:

- north side: Macho River, Closse River;
- east side: Closse River, Mégiscane River, Lake Misères, Mégiscane Lake, Canusio Lake;
- south side: Berthelot Lake (Mégiscane River), Mégiscane River, Whitegoose River, Mégiscane Lake;
- west side: Achepabanca River North-East, Achepabanca Lake, Delestres River.

== Toponymy ==
The origin of hydronyms "Lac Maricourt" and "Canton Maricourt" are linked. The term "Maricourt" is a family name of French origin and a commune in France.

The toponym "lac Maricourt" was formalized on December 5, 1968, by the Commission de toponymie du Québec, when it was created.

== See also ==
- James Bay
- Nottaway River, a watercourse
- Matagami Lake, a body of water
- Bell River, a watercourse
- Parent Lake (Abitibi), a body of water
- Mégiscane River, a watercourse
- Macho River, a watercourse
- Berthelot Lake (Mégiscane River), a watercourse
- Senneterre, a city
- List of lakes in Canada
