= Waswanipi =

Waswanipi may refer to:

- Waswanipi, Quebec, a Cree village in Eeyou Istchee, Quebec, Canada
- Waswanipi (Cree village municipality), a Cree Reserved Land located in Eeyou Istchee, Quebec, Canada
- Waswanipi River, a tributary of Matagami Lake in Quebec, Canada
- Lake Waswanipi, a body of water crossed by the Waswanipi River in Quebec, Canada
