= Saint-Père =

Saint-Père may refer to:

- Saint-Père Lake, head water body of Saint-Père River in Quebec, Canada
- Saint-Père River, a tributary of Wetetnagami River in Quebec, Canada
- Saint-Père, Ille-et-Vilaine, France
- Saint-Père, Nièvre, France
- Saint-Père, Yonne, France

== See also ==
- The Abbey of Saint-Père-en-Vallée a Benedictine abbey, originally outside the walls of Chartres, France
