= Nicobi =

Nicobi may refer to:

- Nicobi River in Quebec, Canada
- Nicobi Lake in Quebec, Canada
