= Bachelor River =

Bachelor
- Watershed of Nottaway River

Location
- Country: Canada
- Province: Quebec
- Region: Nord-du-Québec

Physical characteristics
- Source: Billy Lake
  - location: Eeyou Istchee Baie-James, Nord-du-Québec, Quebec
  - coordinates: 49°34′20″N 76°19′37″W
  - elevation: 381 m (1,250 ft)
- Mouth: Lake Waswanipi
  - location: Eeyou Istchee Baie-James, Nord-du-Québec, Quebec
  - coordinates: 49°29′53″N 76°19′37″W
  - elevation: 319 m (1,047 ft)
- Length: 36.5 km (22.7 mi)

Basin features
- Tributaries
  - left: (in upstream order); Little Bachelor River
  - right: Narsillac creek

The Bachelor River is a tributary of Lake Waswanipi, flowing into the Regional County Municipality (RCM) of Eeyou Istchee Baie-James, within the administrative region of Nord-du-Québec, in the province of Quebec, in Canada. The course of the river crosses the townships of Lesueur and Nelligan.

The hydrographic slope of the Bachelor River is accessible via route 113 which links Lebel-sur-Quévillon to Chibougamau. This road follows in part the valley of the Bachelor River. In addition, the Canadian National Railway serves this small valley.

The surface of the Bachelor River is usually frozen from early November to mid-May, however, safe ice circulation is generally from mid-November to mid-April.

== Geography ==
The main hydrographic slopes near the Bachelor River are:
- North side: Waswanipi River, Little Waswanipi River;
- East side: Opawica Lake, Wachigabau Lake, Opawica River;
- South side: O'Sullivan River, Pusticamica Lake, Wetetnagami River;
- West side: Lake Waswanipi, O'Sullivan River, Iserhoff River.

The Bachelor River originates at the mouth of Billy Lake (length: 2.9 kilometres (1.8 mi) altitude: 299 metres (981 ft)) which is located on the southeastern side of the route 113 to:

- 0.6 kilometres (0.37 mi) West of Opawica Lake;
- 22.6 kilometres (14.0 mi) Northeast of the mouth of the Bachelor River (confluence with Lake Waswanipi;
- 35.0 kilometres (21.7 mi) East of the mouth of Lake Waswanipi (confluence with the Waswanipi River);
- 70.2 kilometres (43.6 mi) East of the mouth of Goéland Lake (Waswanipi River);
- 118.4 kilometres (73.6 mi) Southeast of the mouth of Lake Matagami;
- 281 kilometres (175 mi) Southeast of the mouth of the Nottaway River (confluence with Rupert Bay);
- 90.6 kilometres (56.3 mi) Northeast of the village center of Lebel-sur-Quévillon.

From its source, the "Bachelor River" flows on 36.5 kilometres (22.7 mi) according to the following segments:

- 6.0 kilometres (3.7 mi) Southwesterly in Lesueur Township to the north shore of Bachelor Lake;
- 3.0 kilometres (1.9 mi) West across Bachelor Lake (length: 3.2 kilometres (2.0 mi); altitude: 293 metres (961 ft));
- 9.4 kilometres (5.8 mi) Southwesterly by cutting off route 113 to the eastern limit of the canton de Nelligan;
- 4.4 kilometres (2.7 mi) Southwesterly, cutting the Canadian National Railway, to a creek (from the North);
- 8.2 kilometres (5.1 mi) Southwesterly to the confluence of the Little Bachelor River (coming from the Southwest);
- 5.5 kilometres (3.4 mi) Northwesterly by cutting the Canadian National Railway to its mouth.

The Bachelor River flows into a narrow bay on the Southeast shore of Lake Waswanipi; this mouth is located nearby (North side) of the Canadian National Railway track. From this mouth, the current flows northward, on the Lake Waswanipi, to its mouth. From there, the current flows first North through the Waswanipi River, then West to the East shore of Goéland Lake (Waswanipi River). The latter is crossed to the Northwest by the Waswanipi River which is a tributary of Matagami Lake.

The mouth of the Bachelor River located at:

- 24.4 kilometres (15.2 mi) Southeast of the mouth of Lake Waswanipi (confluence with the Waswanipi River);
- 58.9 kilometres (36.6 mi) Southeast of the mouth of Goéland Lake (Waswanipi River);
- 75.5 kilometres (46.9 mi) Southeast of the mouth of Olga Lake (Waswanipi River);
- 38.2 kilometres (23.7 mi) Southwest of the village center of Waswanipi;
- 99.7 kilometres (62.0 mi) East of downtown Matagami.

== Toponymy ==
The toponym "Bachelor River" was formalized on December 5, 1968, at the Commission de toponymie du Québec.

== See also ==
- James Bay
- Rupert Bay
- Nottaway River, a watercourse
- Lake Matagami, a body of water
- Waswanipi River, a watercourse
- Goéland Lake (Waswanipi River), a body of water
- Lake Waswanipi, a body of water
- Little Bachelor River, a watercourse
- List of rivers of Quebec
