= Pierrefonds =

Pierrefonds may refer to:

- Pierrefonds, Oise commune in Oise, France
  - Château de Pierrefonds, castle in Pierrefonds, restored by Eugène Viollet-le-Duc
- Pierrefonds-Roxboro, a borough of Montreal, Canada
  - Pierrefonds Comprehensive High School, a high-school in the borough
  - Pierrefonds-Senneville, the borough that preceded the current one
  - Pierrefonds, Quebec, a defunct city now part of the borough
  - Pierrefonds—Dollard, a federal district on the island of Montreal
- Pierrefonds Airport, an airport in the island of Réunion
- Pierrefonds River, a tributary of the Panache River in Quebec, Canada
