= Wetetnagami Lake =

Lake in Quebec, Canada

- Watershed of Nottaway River

- Location within Quebec
- Location: Eeyou Istchee Baie-James (municipality)
- Coordinates: 48°54′40″N 76°15′32″W
- Primary inflows: Wetetnagami River, Saint-Père River
- Primary outflows: Wetetnagami River
- Basin countries: Canada
- Max. length: 18.7 kilometres (11.6 mi)
- Max. width: 9.7 kilometres (6.0 mi)
- Surface area: 21.77 kilometres (13.53 mi)
- Surface elevation: 370 metres (1,210 ft)

Wetetnagami Lake is a body of freshwater crossed by Wetetnagami River in the eastern part of Senneterre in the RCM La Vallée-de-l'Or Regional County Municipality, in the administrative region of Abitibi-Témiscamingue, in province of Quebec, in Canada. This stretch of water straddles the townships of Labrie and Moquin.

Forestry is the main economic activity of the sector. With the creation of the Wetetnagami Lake Protected Biodiversity Reserve, recreational and tourism activities are being developed. This lake is the heart of this reserve.

The Wetetnagami Lake watershed is accessible via a forest road that passes north of the lake and one that passes south near Lake Cemetery. Its surface is generally frozen from the beginning of December to the end of April.

== Geography ==
This lake has a length of 18.7 kilometres (11.6 mi) in the shape of a T whose trunk is broken and curved to the right.

Lake Wetetnagami gets its supplies on the east side via the Saint-Père River; on the west side, by some small streams; and on the south side by the Wetetnagami River.

The mouth of this lake is located at the bottom of a North Bay at:

- 39.4 kilometres (24.5 mi) south of the confluence of the Wetetnagami River and Nicobi Lake;
- 99.3 kilometres (61.7 mi) north-east of downtown Senneterre;
- 60.4 kilometres (37.5 mi) East of the village center of Lebel-sur-Quévillon;
- 73.2 kilometres (45.5 mi) west of Gouin Reservoir.

The main hydrographic slopes near Wetetnagami Lake are:

- North side: Wetetnagami River, Dazemard River, Nicobi Lake;
- East side: Saint-Père River, Macho River, Maseres Lake;
- South side: Wetetnagami River;
- West side: O'Sullivan River, Mégiscane River.

== Toponymy ==
The term "Holy Father" is a family name of French origin.

The toponym "Lake Wetetnagami" was formalized on December 5, 1968, by the Commission de toponymie du Québec when it was created.

== See also ==
- Nottaway River, a watercourse
- Matagami Lake, a body of water
- Waswanipi River, a watercourse
- Opawica River, a watercourse
- Nicobi River, a watercourse
- Nicobi Lake, a watercourse
- Opawica River, a watercourse
- Eeyou Istchee Baie-James (municipality), a municipality
- List of lakes in Canada
