= CFS Senneterre =

Radar station in Quebec, Canada

- RCAF Station Senneterre
- Part of the Pinetree Line
- Senneterre, Quebec, Canada

Site information
- Code: C-8
- Owner: Private
- Controlled by: Royal Canadian Air Force
- Condition: Partially demolished, also repurposed

Location
- Coordinates: 48.36190°N 77.22271°W

Site history
- Built: 1950
- Built by: Royal Canadian Air Force
- In use: 1953-1988

Garrison information
- Garrison: 34 AC&W Squadron

CFS Senneterre, initially called RCAF Station Senneterre prior to 1967, was a long-range radar and Ground Control Intercept station, part of the Pinetree Line radar defence network, situated 40 miles (64 km) north of Val-d'Or, Quebec. Situated atop Mount Bell, east of the town of Senneterre, Quebec, construction started in 1950. By 1953 the 34 AC&W Squadron became operational. From 1968 to 1973 Senneterre was the backup to CFB North Bay, the regional command post; in the event it was incapacitated by a nuclear strike, Senneterre was designated an Alternative Command Post (ALCOP). In 1988 the station was deemed no longer necessary as a long-range radar, and closed.

== Post closure ==
After closure in 1988 some of the facilities were sold to private interests. At the operations site:

- Telebec purchased the southmost radar building and erected a cell phone tower 48.36140°N 77.22291°W.
- The height finder building 48.36261°N 77.22237°W has been demolished for unknown reasons.
- The operations building 48.36180°N 77.22254°W was demolished after a fire in the early 1990s.
- The SAGE Annex 48.36195°N 77.22271°W is intact and privately owned.
- The northmost standing radar building 48.36208°N 77.22218°W is intact and privately owned.
- The TX and RX communications buildings have been repurposed by a local firearms club as indoor target ranges.
