= Berthelot Lake =

Lake in Senneterre, Quebec, Canada

- Watershed of Nottaway River

- Location within Quebec
- Location: Senneterre
- Coordinates: 48°33′03″N 76°07′57″W
- Primary inflows: Mégiscane River, Berthelot River (Mégiscane River), Macho River
- Primary outflows: Mégiscane River
- Basin countries: Canada
- Max. length: 7.3 kilometres (4.5 mi)
- Max. width: 3.7 kilometres (2.3 mi)
- Surface elevation: 385 metres (1,263 ft)

Berthelot Lake is a freshwater body of Berthelot Township, in the Senneterre territory, in La Vallée-de-l'Or Regional County Municipality (RCM), in the administrative region of Abitibi-Témiscamingue, in the province of Quebec, in Canada.

Forestry is the main economic activity of the sector. Its surface is generally frozen from the beginning of December to the end of April.

The hydrographic slope of Lake Berthelot is difficult to access as it does not have a nearby forest road. Only the road R0808 passes far north side, south of Maserès Lake; and a branch of this route beginning northwest of Faillon Lake serves the South Sector between the Mégiscane River and the Canadian National Railway.

== Geography ==
This lake has a length of 7.3 kilometres (4.5 mi) and has a real archipelago of islands; the largest island has a length of 3.9 kilometres (2.4 mi). A peninsula of 2.6 kilometres (1.6 mi) advances in the lake from the North shore, between the mouth of the Macho River and the Mégiscane River.

Lake Berthelot gets its supplies on the North-East side by the Mégiscane River; on the north side, by the Macho River; and on the south side by the Berthelot River (Mégiscane River).

The mouth of this lake is located at the bottom of a southwestern bay at:

- 7.8 kilometres (4.8 mi) north-east of the confluence of the Achepabanca River and the Mégiscane River;
- 82.8 kilometres (51.4 mi) north-east of downtown Senneterre;
- 72.9 kilometres (45.3 mi) north-east of the confluence of the Mégiscane River with Parent Lake (Abitibi);
- 32.3 kilometres (20.1 mi) North of the railway (Gagnon-Siding stop) of the Canadian National Railway

The main hydrographic slopes near Lake Berthelot are:

- North side: Macho River, Maricourt Lake;
- East side: Mégiscane Lake, Whitegoose River, Mégiscane River;
- South side: Berthelot River, Whitegoose River;
- West side: Achepabanca River, Mégiscane River.

== Toponymy ==
Formerly, this lake was named "lake of the islands". The term "Berthelot" is a family name of French origin.

The toponym "lac Berthelot" was formalized on December 5, 1968, by the Commission de toponymie du Québec when it was created.

== See also ==
- Macho River, a watercourse
- Berthelot River, a watercourse
- Mégiscane River, a watercourse
- Parent Lake (Abitibi), a body of water
- Bell River, a watercourse
- Matagami Lake, a body of water
- Nottaway River, a watercourse
- Senneterre, a city
- La Vallée-de-l'Or Regional County Municipality (RCM)
- List of lakes in Canada
