= Opawica Lake =

- Watershed of Nottaway River

- Location within Quebec
- Location: Eeyou Istchee Baie-James (municipality)
- Coordinates: 49°36′56″N 75°56′52″W
- Type: Lake of dam
- Primary inflows: Opawica River (discharge of Wachigabau Lake); Dalime creek.
- Primary outflows: Opawica River
- Basin countries: Canada
- Max. length: 17.1 kilometres (10.6 mi)
- Max. width: 7.3 kilometres (4.5 mi)
- Surface elevation: 301 metres (988 ft)

Opawica Lake is a freshwater body crossed by the Opawica River in the southern part of Eeyou Istchee James Bay (municipality), in Jamésie, in the administrative region of Nord-du-Québec, in the province of Quebec, in Canada. This lake extends into the townships of Boyvinet, Lesueur, Ghent and Esperance.

Forestry is the main economic activity of the sector. Recreational tourism activities come second with a navigable body of water 22.1 kilometres (13.7 mi) from one end to the other, skirting Opawica Island. This lake is formed by an enlargement of the Opawica River and includes a dam at its mouth.

The northern and western portions of the Lake Opawica watershed are accessible via the forest road route 113 linking Chibougamau to Lebel-sur-Quévillon. A forest road serving the southern, eastern and northern shores of Opawica and Wachigabau lakes connects via the north to route 113. The southern part is accessible through the Canadian National Railway which passes between these two lakes.

The surface of Opawica Lake is usually frozen from early November to mid-May, however, safe ice movement is generally from mid-November to mid-April.

== Geography ==
This lake has a length of 17.1 kilometres (10.6 mi), a maximum width of 7.3 kilometres (4.5 mi) and an altitude of 301 metres (988 ft). The shape of the lake resembles an ax whose sharp part is oriented towards the North.

Opawaca Island (length: 3.6 kilometres (2.2 mi), almost round shape) is located in western part of the lac. The size of this island with a mountain peak of 360 metres (1,180 ft) significantly reduces the water surface of this part of the lake. The eastern part of the lake that stretches out at 11.6 kilometres (7.2 mi) is narrow and elongated and collects the waters of Dalime Creek (from the North).

Gabriel Lake is the source of the Opawica River, which flows northwest into a succession of rapids. The Opawica River from the East first crosses Lichen Lake and Wachigabau Lake, then flows into Lake Opawica via two points of entry, which are located at each end of Gull Island (length: 5.1 kilometres (3.2 mi); width: 1.5 kilometres (0.93 mi)). This island and the two peninsulas (one extending westward on 3.3 kilometres (2.1 mi) from the east shore, and the other from the west stretching on 6.2 kilometres (3.9 mi)) form a strip of land of 14.6 kilometres (9.1 mi) in length that runs the full length of the Canadian National Railway.

The mouth of Opawica Lake has a dam and is located at the bottom of a bay north of the western part of the lake, at:

- 8.5 kilometres (5.3 mi) South of the mouth of the Opawica River;
- 30.0 kilometres (18.6 mi) northeast of Lake Waswanipi;
- 9.3 kilometres (5.8 mi) south of the village center of Waswanipi;
- 74.9 kilometres (46.5 mi) east of the mouth of Goéland Lake (Waswanipi River);
- 284.8 kilometres (177.0 mi) south-east of the mouth of the Nottaway River;
- 125.2 kilometres (77.8 mi) east of downtown Matagami;
- 116.3 kilometres (72.3 mi) south-west of downtown Chibougamau.

The main hydrographic slopes near Opawica Lake are:

- North side: Opawica River, Chibougamau River, Waswanipi River;
- East side: Opawica River;
- South side: Wachigabau Lake, Opawica River, Lichen Lake, Nicobi River;
- West side: Bachelor River, Lake Waswanipi.

From the dam at the mouth of Opawica Lake, the course of the Opawica River flows over 14 kilometres (8.7 mi) first to the northeast to a river bend, then northwesterly to its confluence with the Chibougamau River. This confluence of these two rivers becomes the head of the Waswanipi River.

== Toponymy ==
This body of water is indicated under the graph "Opawakow Sagagan Gold Sandy Point L." on the map of explorations of Henry O'Sullivan (1897-1899), published in 1900.

This toponym is mentioned in the Dictionary of Rivers and Lakes of the Province of Quebec in 1925; this word Cree means there is a pass, a narrowing between sandbanks.

The toponym "Lake Opawica" was formalized on December 5, 1968, by the Commission de toponymie du Québec, i.e. at the creation of this commission.

== See also ==
- Nottaway River, a watercourse
- Matagami Lake, a body of water
- Waswanipi River, a watercourse
- Goéland Lake (Waswanipi River), a body of water
- Opawica River, a watercourse
- Eeyou Istchee Baie-James (municipality), a municipality
- List of lakes of Canada
