= Wetetnagami River =

Wetetnagami
- Watershed of Nottaway River

Location
- Country: Canada
- Province: Quebec
- Region: Nord-du-Québec

Physical characteristics
- Source: Nemenjiche Lake
  - location: Senneterre, Quebec, Nord-du-Québec, Quebec
  - coordinates: 48°40′39″N 76°24′21″W
  - elevation: 472 m (1,549 ft)
- Mouth: Nicobi Lake
  - location: Eeyou Istchee Baie-James, Nord-du-Québec, Quebec
  - coordinates: 49°17′13″N 76°54′27″W
  - elevation: 336 m (1,102 ft)
- Length: 87.8 km (54.6 mi)

Basin features
- Tributaries
  - right: (in upstream order); Discharge of Descoteaux and Normandeau Lakes; Muy River; Panache River; Dazemard River; Saint-Père River; Discharge of Roger Lake; Discharge of Macoustigane Lake; Discharge of Cimetière Lake; Discharge of Yvan and Charrette Lakes

The Wetetnagami River is a tributary of the south shore of Nicobi Lake flowing in Quebec, in Canada, overlapping the administrative areas of:

- Abitibi-Témiscamingue: in Senneterre, Quebec;
- Nord-du-Québec: in Eeyou Istchee Baie-James.

This river successively crosses the townships of Charrette, Adhémar, Labrie, Moquin, Effiat and Muy. The surface of the Wetetnagami River is generally frozen from early December to late April. Forestry is the main economic activity of the sector; recreational tourism activities, second.

The Wetetnagami River Valley is served by the R1015 forest road (North-South direction) and the R1051 (East-West direction).

The proposed [Wetetnagami Lake Biodiversity Reserve] extends to 234.2 kilometres (145.53 mi) in the eastern part of Senneterre, Quebec, on the west side of the Gouin Reservoir. The territory of the reserve feeds the Wetetnagami River, as well as the lake of the same name and Lake Achepabanca. Many recreational and tourist activities are allowed on this reserve.

== Geography ==
The adjacent hydrographic slopes of the Wetetnagami River are:
- north side: Nicobi Lake, Opawica River, Lake Waswanipi;
- east side: Muy River, Panache River, Fortier River, Macho River, Mégiscane River;
- south side: Mégiscane River, Macho River, Berthelot Lake, Achepabanca River;
- west side: O'Sullivan River, Périgny River.

The Wetetnagami River originated in Senneterre, Quebec, at the mouth of Louison Lake (length: 4.6 kilometres (2.9 mi); maximum width: 1.8 kilometres (1.1 mi) including a bay extending to the south in the western part of the lake, altitude: 472 metres (1,549 ft)). This lake is overlooked by a few mountains on the south side whose peaks reach respectively 510 metres (1,670 ft), 512 metres (1,680 ft) and 505 metres (1,657 ft) in the north; 509 metres (1,670 ft) in the Northwest; and 545 metres (1,788 ft) in the Northeast.

The mouth of Lake Louisson is located in Senneterre, Quebec at:

- 72.0 kilometres (44.7 mi) south of the mouth of the Wetetnagami River;
- 75.9 kilometres (47.2 mi) west of Gouin Reservoir;
- 69.7 kilometres (43.3 mi) northeast of downtown Senneterre, Quebec;
- 60.3 kilometres (37.5 mi) south-east of the village center of Lebel-sur-Quévillon;
- 87.8 kilometres (54.6 mi) southeast of Waswanipi Lake;
- 49.0 kilometres (30.4 mi) southeast of the Canadian National Railway (Gorsythe Station).

The course of the Wetetnagami River:

- appears to be continuity towards the north of the Capousacataca River;
- is generally northbound in parallel and on the east side of the O'Sullivan River.

From the mouth of Louison Lake, the Wetetnagami River flows over 87.8 kilometres (54.6 mi) according to the following segments:

Upper part of Wetetnagami River (segment of 18.5 kilometres (11.5 mi))

- 4.1 kilometres (2.5 mi) of which 1.2 kilometres (0.75 mi) southwesterly to the west bank of a lake Kâwîsikomînikak (length: 0.5 kilometres (0.31 mi); altitude: 447 metres (1,467 ft)) that the current flows north on 3.6 kilometres (2.2 mi);
- 3.1 kilometres (1.9 mi) southwesterly winding to Mitikocike Lake;
- 2.0 kilometres (1.2 mi) northward across a Mitikocike Lake (elevation: 432 metres (1,417 ft), formed by widening of the river) to its full length;
- 4.0 kilometres (2.5 mi) north across an unidentified lake (formed by the widening of the river) on 2.5 kilometres (1.6 mi);
- 5.3 kilometres (3.3 mi) north westerly crossing to the south end of Wewedinagamik Lake;

Intermediate part of the Wetetnagami River (segment of 21.4 kilometres (13.3 mi))

- 10.3 kilometres (6.4 mi) to the north, crossing the full length of Lake Wewedinagamik (elevation: 380 kilometres (240 mi)) formed by a widening of the river;
- 11.1 kilometres (6.9 mi) north across Wetetnagami Lake (elevation: 380 kilometres (240 mi)). Note: Wewedinagamik and Wetetnagami lakes are related, being linked together by a strait of about 0.2 kilometres (0.12 mi). Note: Lake Wetetnagami receives on the east side the waters of the Saint-Père River. This lake has a bay extending northward (4.8 kilometres (3.0 mi) and another extending 2.7 kilometres (1.7 mi) to the southeast.

Lower part of the Wetetnagami River (segment of 47.9 kilometres (29.8 mi))

- 5.9 kilometres (3.7 mi) north, to a forest road;
- 11.5 kilometres (7.1 mi) to the north by entering Eeyou Istchee Baie-James, until the confluence of the Dazemard River (coming from the East);
- 10.7 kilometres (6.6 mi) north through a marsh area to the confluence of the Panache River (coming from the northeast);
- 0.6 kilometres (0.37 mi) northwesterly to the confluence of the Muy River (coming from the Northeast);
- 10.8 kilometres (6.7 mi) northwesterly to the forest road;
- 8.4 kilometres (5.2 mi) northeasterly to the dam at its confluence with the Nicobi Lake.

The Wetetnagami River flows into a small bay on the South shore of Nicobi Lake, which empties into the Nicobi River. The latter flows North to discharge on the Southeast bank of the Opawica River. The latter goes up North to its confluence with the Chibougamau River; this confluence is the source of the Waswanipi River. The course runs westward and crosses the northern portion of Lake Waswanipi, Goéland Lake (Waswanipi River) and Olga Lake (Waswanipi River), before spilling into Matagami Lake which in turn flows into the Nottaway River, a tributary of Rupert Bay (James Bay).

The confluence of the Wetetnagami River with the Nicobi Lake is located at:

- 22.4 kilometres (13.9 mi) South-West of the mouth of the Nicobi River;
- 31.3 kilometres (19.4 mi) East of Lake Waswanipi;
- 130.9 kilometres (81.3 mi) Northeast of downtown Senneterre, Quebec;
- 70.6 kilometres (43.9 mi) Northeast of the village center of Lebel-sur-Quévillon;
- 89.5 kilometres (55.6 mi) Northwest of Gouin Reservoir;
- 114.3 kilometres (71.0 mi) North of the railway line (Gagnon-Siding stop) of the Canadian National Railway.

== History ==
Formerly this territory was occupied according to the periods by the Attikameks, the Algonquins and the Cree.

The toponym "Wetetnagami River" was made official on December 5, 1968, at the Commission de toponymie du Québec, when it was created.

== See also ==
- James Bay
- Rupert Bay
- Nottaway River, a watercourse
- Matagami Lake, a body of water
- Waswanipi River, a watercourse
- Opawica River, a watercourse
- Nicobi River, a watercourse
- Saint-Père River, a watercourse
- Dazemard River, a watercourse
- Panache River, a watercourse
- River Muy, a watercourse
- Wetetnagami Lake, a body of water
- Senneterre, Quebec
- Eeyou Istchee Baie-James
- James Bay
- Proposed Wetetnagami Lake Biodiversity Reserve
- List of rivers of Quebec
