= Macho River =

Macho
- Watershed of Nottaway River

Location
- Country: Canada
- Province: Quebec
- Region: Nord-du-Québec

Physical characteristics
- Source
  - location: Senneterre, La Vallée-de-l'Or Regional County Municipality (RCM), Abitibi-Témiscamingue, Quebec
  - coordinates: 49°03′37″N 75°44′40″W
  - elevation: 390 m (1,280 ft)
- Mouth: Berthelot River (Mégiscane River), Mégiscane River
  - location: Senneterre, Abitibi-Témiscamingue, Quebec
  - coordinates: 48°34′36″N 76°06′50″W
  - elevation: 385 m (1,263 ft)
- Length: 69.6 km (43.2 mi)

Basin features
- Tributaries
  - left: Closse River; outlet of lakes Minson, Germanneau and Gardet; outlet of lake Lago; outlet of lake Delafond; outlet of lake Mongodon.
  - right: outlet of lake Boudor; outlet of lakes Goyaud and Denevers; Anna creek; outlet of lakes Lunch and Portage; outlet of lakes Limpide and Christin.

The Macho River is a tributary of the Mégiscane River, flowing in Quebec, Canada, in the territories of:

- Eeyou Istchee James Bay (Municipality), in the administrative region of Nord-du-Québec;
- Senneterre, in La Vallée-de-l'Or Regional County Municipality, in the administrative region of Abitibi-Témiscamingue, where the course of the river crosses successively the cantons of Souart, Masères, Closse, Maricourt and Berthelot.

The Macho River flows entirely in forested territory north-east of the La Vérendrye Wildlife Reserve and on the west side of Gouin Reservoir. Forestry is the main economic activity of this hydrographic slope; recreational tourism activities, second.

The surface of the river is usually frozen from mid-December to mid-April. The course of this river has a difference in height of only five meters.

== Geography ==
The Macho River originates at the southern limit of the Eeyou Istchee James Bay (municipality) administrative region in a large swamp area. Its course begins with a widening of the river (elevation: 390 metres (1,280 ft)), located at 0.4 kilometres (0.25 mi) south-east of the Panache River which sinks to the southwest, to discharge on the north bank of the Wetetnagami River.

This source of the river is located at:

- 0.9 kilometres (0.56 mi) south-east of route 105B going up to the northeast [Panache River];
- 60.8 kilometres (37.8 mi) north of the confluence of the Macho River with Berthelot Lake (Mégiscane River);
- 132.8 kilometres (82.5 mi) north-east of downtown Senneterre;
- 73.7 kilometres (45.8 mi) northwest of the village center of Obedjiwan;
- 93.0 kilometres (57.8 mi) north of the Canadian National Railway.

The main hydrographic slopes near the Macho River are:

- North side: Panache River, Fortier River;
- east side: Barry Lake (Saint-Cyr River South), Saint-Cyr River South, Saint-Cyr Lake (Saint-Cyr River South), Mégiscane Lake, Mégiscane River;
- South side: Mégiscane River, Berthelot lake;
- West side: Wetetnagami River, Saint-Père River, Wetetnagami Lake, Achepabanca River, Achepabanca River Northeast.

From its source, the Macho River flows over 69.6 kilometres (43.2 mi) according to the following segments:

Upper Macho River (segment of 46.7 kilometres (29.0 mi))

- 9.8 kilometres (6.1 mi) to the south surrounded by marsh areas, and enters the administrative region of Abitibi-Témiscamingue, to the north shore of Loutres Lake;
- 7.7 kilometres (4.8 mi) southerly crossing Loutres Lake (elevation: 387 metres (1,270 ft)) to its mouth on the west shore;
- 10.9 kilometres (6.8 mi) southwesterly through marsh areas on each side of the river to the north shore of Maseres Lake;
- 18.3 kilometres (11.4 mi) southerly, crossing Maseres Lake (elevation: 385 metres (1,263 ft)) to its mouth;

Lower Macho River (segment of 26.0 kilometres (16.2 mi))

- 5.6 kilometres (3.5 mi) southerly, including crossing the unidentified lake (elevation: 385 metres (1,263 ft)) consisting of a widening of the river to its mouth;
- 7.2 kilometres (4.5 mi) southwesterly, then south, to the north shore of Maricourt Lake (Macho River);
- 6.9 kilometres (4.3 mi) southerly crossing the northern portion of Maricourt Lake (Macho River) (elevation: 385 metres (1,263 ft)) along its entire length, to a straight line formed by the reconciliation of two opposite peninsulas. Note: The Closse River (coming from the East) flows on the east shore of the northern part of this lake;
- 6.3 kilometres (3.9 mi) southerly, crossing the southern portion of Maricourt Lake (Macho River), to the confluence of the river.

The Macho River discharges at the bottom of a bay on the north shore of Berthelot Lake (elevation: 385 metres (1,263 ft) which empties onto the north shore of the Mégiscane River The latter is a tributary of Parent Lake (Abitibi) .This latter lake empties into the Bell River, a tributary of Matagami Lake. in turn flows into the Nottaway River, a tributary of the southeast shore of James Bay.

This confluence of the Macho River with Berthelot Lake (Mégiscane River) is located opposite the confluence of the Berthelot River (Mégiscane River); upstream of Rapides Manidioc and the confluence of the Achepabanca River; and downstream of the confluence of the Whitegoose River. Specifically, the Macho River flows to:

- 62.5 kilometres (38.8 mi) East of the confluence of the Mégiscane River with Parent Lake (Abitibi);
- 36.1 kilometres (22.4 mi) north of the former Gagnon-Siding Railway Station of the Canadian National Railway;
- 86.8 kilometres (53.9 mi) north-east of the village center of Senneterre;
- 51.0 kilometres (31.7 mi) west of Gouin Reservoir.

== Toponymy ==
The toponym "Macho River" was formalized on December 5, 1968, at the Commission de toponymie du Québec.

== See also ==
- Nottaway River, a watercourse
- Matagami Lake, a body of water
- Bell River, a watercourse
- Parent Lake (Abitibi), a body of water
- Mégiscane River, a watercourse
- Gouin Reservoir, a body of water
- Maricourt Lake (Macho River), a body of water
- Berthelot Lake (Mégiscane River), a body of water
- Senneterre, a city
- La Vallée-de-l'Or Regional County Municipality (MRC)
- List of rivers of Quebec
