= Jamésie =

Equivalent territory in Quebec, Canada

Coordinates: 52°00′N 74°45′W

Jamésie and Eeyou Istchee equivalent territories combined

Jamésie (French pronunciation: [ʒamezi]) is a territory equivalent to a regional county municipality (TE) of Nord-du-Québec, Canada.

Its geographical code is 991 and together with Kativik TE and Eeyou Istchee TE it forms the administrative région and census division (CD) of Nord-du-Québec It is located to the east of James Bay, after which the territory is named. It has a land area of 283,955 km^{2} (109,636 sq mi), or slightly larger than Ecuador) and a 2016 population of 13,941 inhabitants. Chibougamau is the largest community in both Jamésie TE and Nord-du-Québec.

The original 2006 census land area was reduced by about 1.74 percent and the population was reduced by 47.25 percent by the creation and departure of the Eeyou Istchee TE in 2007. Further administration changes came under the terms of the Agreement on Governance in the Eeyou Istchee James Bay Territory of July 24, 2012, when the local municipality of Baie-James within Jamésie ceased to exist, and was replaced by the local municipality of Eeyou Istchee James Bay, which is specialized local municipality governed and managed jointly by the Cree of Eeyou Istchee TE and the non-Cree of Jamésie TE.

== Subdivisions ==
The TE of Jamésie consists of:

- the municipality (M) of Eeyou Istchee James Bay,
- the enclaved cities (V) of

- Lebel-sur-Quévillon
- Matagami
- Chapais
- Chibougamau
