= Nicobi River =

Nicobi
- Watershed of Nottaway River

Location
- Country: Canada
- Province: Quebec
- Region: Eeyou Istchee Baie-James (municipality)

Physical characteristics
- Source: Nicobi Lake
  - location: Eeyou Istchee Baie-James (municipality), Nord-du-Québec, Quebec
  - coordinates: 48°40′39″N 76°24′21″W
  - elevation: 336 m (1,102 ft)
- Mouth: Lichen Lake (crossed by Opawica River)
  - location: Eeyou Istchee Baie-James (municipality), Nord-du-Québec, Quebec
  - coordinates: 49°27′22″N 75°56′00″W
  - elevation: 301 m (988 ft)
- Length: 9.9 km (6.2 mi)

The Nicobi River is a tributary of the southeastern shore of Lichen Lake (crossed by Opawica River), within the territory of Eeyou Istchee James Bay (municipality), in the administrative region of Nord-du-Québec, in province of Quebec, in Canada.

The surface of the Nicobi River is generally frozen from early December to late April. Forestry is the main economic activity of the sector; recreational tourism activities, second.

Forest roads R1015 (North-South) and R1051 (East-West) are closest to the South side of the Nicobi River Valley. While the North side is served by road 113 which connects Lebel-sur-Quévillon to Chibougamau.

== Geography ==
The hydrographic slopes adjacent to the Nicobi River are:

- North side: Lichen Lake (Opawica River), Opawica River, Wachigabau Lake;
- East side: Lichen Lake (Opawica River), Margry Creek, Germain Creek;
- South side: Nicobi Lake, Wetetnagami River;
- West side: O'Sullivan River, Malouin Lake, Pusticamica Lake, Opawica River.

The Nicobi River originated in Eeyou Istchee James Bay (municipality), at the mouth of Nicobi Lake (length: 18.1 kilometres (11.2 mi); maximum width: 4.1 kilometres (2.5 mi); altitude: 336 metres (1,102 ft)). This lake is mainly fed by the South with the waters of the Wetetnagami River. The southeast shore of the lake has a swamp area. The mouth of the lake is located on the northwest shore, near an island of 25 kilometres (16 mi) in length.

The course of the Nicobi River flows northward across some areas of marsh and through several sets of rapids into its lower half. The Nicobi River flows on the southeastern shore of Lichen Lake which is crossed to the southwest by the Opawica River.

The course of the latter flows westward and successively crosses the northern portion of Lake Waswanipi, Goéland Lake (Waswanipi River) and Olga Lake (Waswanipi River), before entering Matagami Lake which in turn flows into the Nottaway River, a tributary of the Rupert Bay (James Bay).

The confluence of the Nicobi River with the Opawica River is located at:

- 15.5 kilometres (9.6 mi) Southeast of route 113;
- 29.5 kilometres (18.3 mi) East of Lake Waswanipi;
- 129 kilometres (80 mi) East of downtown Matagami;
- 89.9 kilometres (55.9 mi) Northeast of the village center of Lebel-sur-Quévillon;
- 114.9 kilometres (71.4 mi) Northwest of the venter of village Obedjiwan (Indian Reserve).

== History ==
Formerly this territory was occupied according to the periods by the Attikameks, the Algonquins and the Cree. This hydronym is indicated on a map dated 1950. In the Innu language, Nicobi, like Nicabau (nekupau), would mean "with hay-covered earth points or wooded alders".

The toponym "Nicobi River" was formalized on December 5, 1968, at the Commission de toponymie du Québec, when it was created.

== See also ==
- James Bay
- Rupert Bay
- Nottaway River, a watercourse
- Matagami Lake, a body of water
- Waswanipi River, a watercourse
- Opawica River, a watercourse
- Lichen Lake (Opawica River), a body of water
- Nicobi Lake, a body of water
- Eeyou Istchee James Bay (municipality)
- James Bay
- List of rivers of Quebec
