= Waswanipi, Quebec =

Waswanipi ᐙᔅᐙᓂᐲ (Cree)
- Terre réservée crie (Cree reserved land)
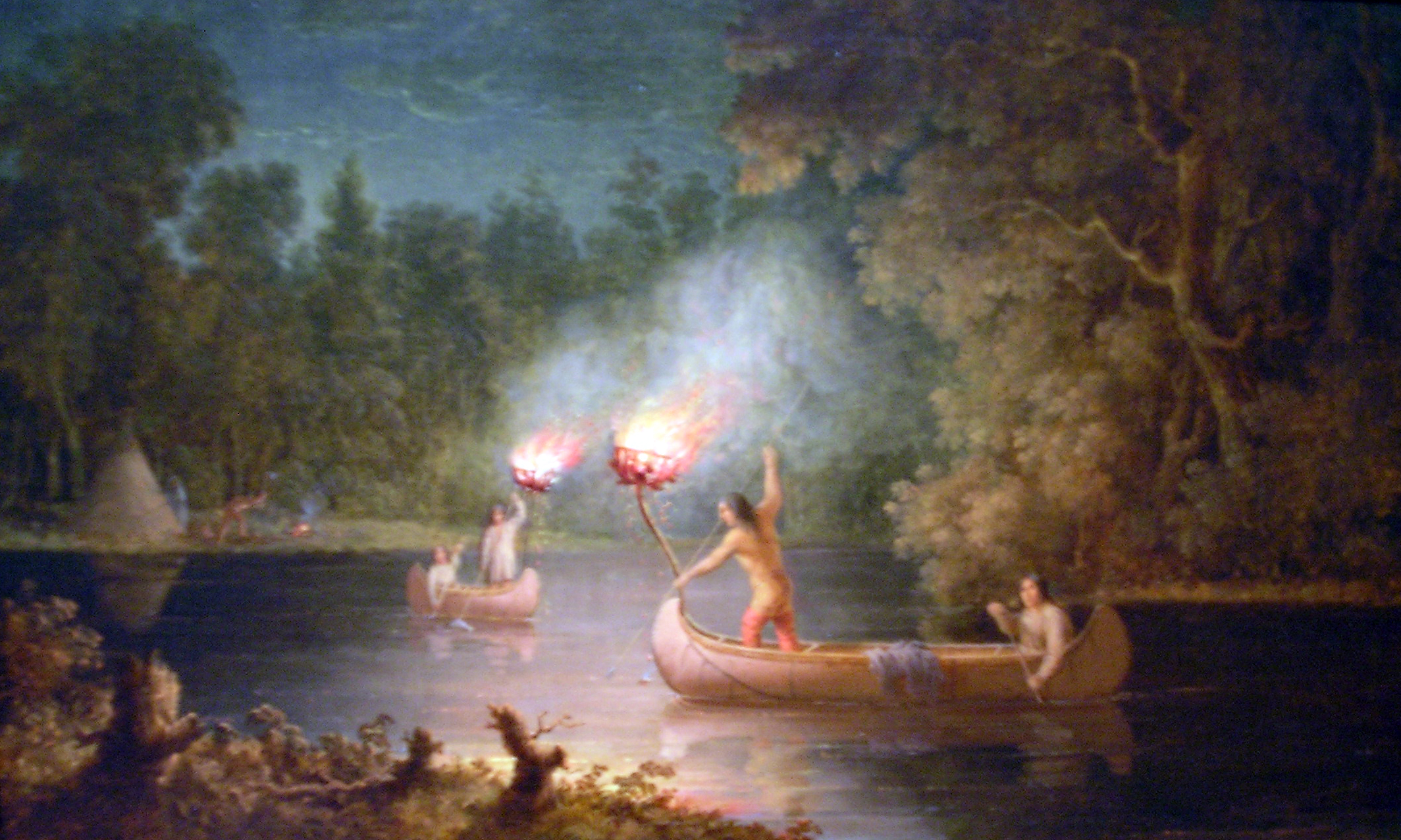
- Etymology: Light over the water
- Location within Quebec
- Coordinates: 49°41′48″N 75°57′40″W
- Country: Canada
- Province: Quebec
- Region: Northern Quebec
- TE: Eeyou Istchee

Government
  - Type: Cree reserved land
  - Chief: Irene Neeposh
  - Deputy Chief: Sammy Salt-Blacksmith

Area
  - Land: 385.83 km^{2} (148.97 sq mi)

Population (2021)
  - Total: 459
  - Density: 1.2/km^{2} (3.1/sq mi)
- Time zone: UTC−5 (EST)
  - Summer (DST): UTC−4 (EDT)
- Postal Code: J0Y 3C0
- Area code: 819
- Website: www.waswanipi.com

Waswanipi (Cree: ᐙᔅᐙᓂᐲ or Wâswânipî) is a Cree community in the Eeyou Istchee territory of central Quebec, Canada, located along Route 113 and near the confluence of the Chibougamau and Waswanipi Rivers. It has a population of 459 people (Canada 2021 Census). Waswanipi is a compound word composed of wâswân (a place to fish at night using a torch) and -pî (lake), meaning "torch-fishing lake" but colloquially translated as "light over the water" referring to the traditional night-time fishing method of luring fish to light by using torches.

The original location of the village was on an island in Lake Waswanipi (49°39′N 76°29′W). It was the site of a Hudson's Bay Company trading post until 1965 when the post was closed. Its residents dispersed until 1978 when the new village of Waswanipi was built about 47 km upstream the Waswanipi River from the former location.

== Demographics ==
Waswanipi is a trilingual community, the majority of its residences speaking the Southern East Cree dialect of the Cree language. Aside from the elderly people, who tend to be monolingual Cree speakers, the majority of the population speaks, in addition to Cree, either English or French, some speaking both.

== Education ==
The Cree School Board operates three schools: Willie J. Happyjack Memorial School (ᐧᐃᓖ ᒉᐄ ᐦᐋᐲᒑᒃ ᒋᔅᑯᑕᒫᒉᐅᑲᒥᒄ), Rainbow Elementary School (ᐲᓯᒧᔮᐲ ᒋᔅᑯᑕᒫᒉᐅᑲᒥᒄ) and Jolina Gull-Blacksmith Memorial School. As of 2017 Happyjack has 536 students.

== See also ==
- Grand Council of the Crees
