= Nicobi Lake =

- Watershed of Nottaway River

- Location within Quebec
- Location: Eeyou Istchee Baie-James (municipality)
- Coordinates: 49°20′43″N 75°59′46″W
- Primary inflows: Wetetnagami River
- Primary outflows: Nicobi River
- Basin countries: Canada
- Max. length: 18.1 kilometres (11.2 mi)
- Max. width: 4.1 kilometres (2.5 mi)
- Surface elevation: 336 metres (1,102 ft)

The Nicobi Lake is a freshwater body of the southern part of Eeyou Istchee James Bay (municipality), in the administrative region of Nord-du-Québec, in the province of Quebec, in Canada.

Forestry is the main economic activity of the sector. Further south, thanks to the creation of the Wetetnagami Lake Protected Biodiversity Reserve, recreational and tourism activities have been highlighted.

The hydrographic slope of Lake Nicobi is accessible via the R1051 forest road which passes to 8.0 kilometres (5.0 mi) south of the lake. Its surface is generally frozen from the beginning of December to the end of April.

== Geography ==
This lake has a length of 18.1 kilometres (11.2 mi) in the North-East direction, a maximum width of 4.1 kilometres (2.5 mi) and an altitude of 336 metres (1,102 ft). It has several dozens of islands.

Lake Nicobi buys mostly from the South side by the Wetetnagami River.

The mouth of this lake is located on the northwest shore at:

- 29.9 kilometres (18.6 mi) east of Lake Waswanipi;
- 128.6 kilometres (79.9 mi) south-east of downtown Chibougamau;
- 86.2 kilometres (53.6 mi) north-east of the village center of Lebel-sur-Quévillon;
- 92.9 kilometres (57.7 mi) northwest of Gouin Reservoir.

The main hydrographic slopes near Lake Nicobi are:

- North side:Nicobi River, Opawica Lake, Opawica River;
- East side:Margry Lake, Margry Creek;
- South side:Wetetnagami River;
- West side:Malouin Lake, Pusticamica Lake.

== Toponymy ==
The explorer Henry O'Sullivan, having traveled this area between 1897 and 1899, indicated on his map of 1900 L. Nicobi to describe the widening of a segment of watercourse. At the same latitude, 125 km further east, we find Lake Nicabau, located northwest of the Ashuapmushuan Wildlife Sanctuary. In the Innu language, Nicobi, like Nicabau (nekupau), would mean "lake with spikes of hay or woods of alders".

The toponym "Lake Nicobi" was formalized on December 5, 1968, by the Commission de toponymie du Québec when it was created.

== See also ==
- Nottaway River, a watercourse
- Matagami Lake, a body of water
- Waswanipi River, a watercourse
- Opawica River, a watercourse
- Opawica Lake, a waterbody
- Nicobi River, a watercourse
- Eeyou Istchee Baie-James (municipality), a municipality
- List of lakes in Canada
