= O'Sullivan River =

O’Sullivan
- Watershed of Nottaway River

Location
- Country: Canada
- Province: Quebec
- Region: Eeyou Istchee Baie-James (municipality)

Physical characteristics
- Source: Unidentified lake
  - location: Eeyou Istchee Baie-James (municipality), Nord-du-Québec, Quebec
  - coordinates: 48°44′48″N 76°25′39″W
  - elevation: 405 m (1,329 ft)
- Mouth: Lake Waswanipi
  - location: Eeyou Istchee Baie-James (municipality), Nord-du-Québec, Quebec
  - coordinates: 49°27′57″N 76°28′05″W
  - elevation: 267 m (876 ft)
- Length: 101.3 km (62.9 mi)

Basin features
- Tributaries
  - left: Mossant creek.
  - right: (from the mouth) Discharge of lake Sheilann, discharge of lake Cahpiteau.

The O'Sullivan River is a tributary of Lake Waswanipi, which is crossed on the North by the Waswanipi River (the James Bay drainage). The O'Sullivan River flows North into the Abitibi Regional County Municipality, and into Eeyou Istchee James Bay (municipality), in the Nord-du-Québec, in Quebec, in Canada.

The course of the O'Sullivan River crosses the townships of Charrette, Adhémar, Labrie, Ralleau, Ruette, Benoit, Duplessis and Bossé.

== Geography ==
The surrounding hydrographic slopes of the O'Sullivan River are:

- north side: Lake Waswanipi, Waswanipi River;
- east side: Wetetnagami River, Mégiscane River;
- south side: Louison Lake, Delestres River;
- west side: Mossant Creek, Lecompte River, Robin River (Parent Lake).

A little unnamed lake (length: 1.8 kilometres (1.1 mi)) is the headwater body of the O'Sullivan River. This lake is located southeast of Castonguay Lake, north of Louison Lake, about 75 kilometres (47 mi) northeast of Senneterre (parish), Abitibi-Témiscamingue. This head lake obtains some 15 small lakes upstream and nearby.

From the small head lake, the O'Sullivan River flows over:

- 9.6 kilometres (6.0 mi) westerly, then northerly to the south shore of Castonguay Lake, which the current flows northward on 10.7 kilometres (6.6 mi), i.e. on its full length;
- 3.9 kilometres (2.4 mi) northerly to the south shore of Gaillard Lake, where the current crosses over 2.2 kilometres (1.4 mi) to the northeast;
- 1.6 kilometres (0.99 mi) northerly to Butterfly Lake (length: 9.5 kilometres (5.9 mi)) as the current flows northward on 1.8 kilometres (1.1 mi);
- 3.2 kilometres (2.0 mi) northerly to the south bank of the "Lake of the Line" which the current flows northward on 9.4 kilometres (5.8 mi);
- 3.0 kilometres (1.9 mi) northerly, to the south shore of Novellet Lake, where the current flows 5.3 kilometres (3.3 mi) north; Lake Novellet receives the waters of the Sheilann Lake outlet from the east;
- 26.8 kilometres (16.7 mi) northwesterly to a south discharge;
- 7.7 kilometres (4.8 mi) northerly and westerly to its mouth on the south shore of Puticamica Lake (length: 19.6 kilometres (12.2 mi)) that the current flows westward on 7.1 kilometres (4.4 mi);
- 9.0 kilometres (5.6 mi) northerly to the south shore of Lake Waswanipi that the current flows through on 18.1 kilometres (11.2 mi) then merge to the current of Waswanipi River.

== Toponymy ==
The natives used the name "Pusticamica" to designate this watercourse.

At the request of the Commission de toponymie du Canada, the name "Rivière O'Sullivan" has been attributed to evoke the work of life of Henry O'Sullivan (Sainte-Catherine-de-Fossambault], 1845 - Loretteville, 1912). After studying at Laval University in 1869, O'Sullivan worked as a land surveyor, geologist and explorer in the Department of Lands and Forests. O'Sullivan explored much of Labrador, Gaspésie, all of Nord-du-Québec.

The toponym O'Sullivan River was formalized on December 5, 1968, at the Bank of Place Names of the Commission de toponymie du Québec.

== See also ==
- Miquelon, a hamlet
- Chapais, a municipality
- Waswanipi River, a watercourse
- Lake Waswanipi, a body of water
- Waswanipi, a village Cree
- Eeyou Istchee Baie-James (municipality), a municipality
- James Bay
- List of rivers of Quebec
