= Lake Waswanipi =

Lake in Nord-du-Québec, Quebec, Canada

- Watershed of Nottaway River

- Location within Quebec
- Location: Baie-James, Quebec
- Coordinates: 49°33′07″N 76°27′00″W
- Type: Natural
- Primary inflows: Waswanipi River, O'Sullivan River, Bachelor River, Taylor creek, Ailly creek
- Primary outflows: Waswanipi River
- Basin countries: Canada
- Max. length: 39.4 kilometres (24.5 mi)
- Max. width: 13.4 kilometres (8.3 mi)
- Surface area: 184.79 kilometres (114.82 mi)
- Surface elevation: 267 metres (876 ft)

Lake Waswanipi is a lake located in municipality of Eeyou Istchee Baie-James (municipalité), in administrative region of Nord-du-Québec, in Quebec, in Canada.

Waswanipi Lake extends into the townships of Bergères, Bossé, Nelligan, Bellin and Ailly.

Forestry is the main economic activity of the sector. Recreational tourism activities come second.

The hydrographic slope of Waswanipi Lake is accessible via the James Bay Road from the Southwest (Matagami), then branches northwards by cutting the Canet River, located at Northwest of Goéland Lake. Forest roads serve the southern part of the lake. The Canadian National railway linking Matagami to Chibougamau passes from the south side of the lake on the strip of land between Pusticamica Lake and Waswanipi Lake.

The surface of Waswanipi Lake is usually frozen from early November to mid-May, however, safe ice circulation is generally from mid-November to mid-April.

== Toponymy ==
The name is of Cree origin. Waswanipi is compound word composed of wâswâ- (to fish at night using a torch) and nipî (water), and is usually translated as "light over the water" referring to the traditional night-time fishing method of luring fish to light by using torches. An island in the lake was historically the location of a Cree summer village, also known by the name of Waswanipi. In the 1970s its people were relocated to Waswanipi, a community located at the intersection of route 113 and Waswanipi River.

The toponym Waswanipi Lake was formalized on December 5, 1968, at the Bank of Place Names of the Commission de toponymie du Quebec.

== History ==
In 1916, Quebec Fisheries, established in Senneterre, began the large-scale exploitation of the fishery resources of this water table rich in sturgeon, trout and pike, including lakes Matagami and Olga. This fishery ended in 1930.

In October 1971, the lake was contaminated with high levels of mercury. Cree Indians were required to stop fishing in the Lake Waswanipi and eating fish from the lake. Four members of the Cree Indians had been hospitalized in Montreal with levels of mercury in their body 10 times higher than the national average. According to the government, the poisoning of the waters was due to the region's rich mineral content of geological strata, yet the result was a direct threat to the Indians' way of life.

== Geography ==
This lake is located south of Waswanipi (a Cri village), West of Chapais, East of Matagami and at about 60 kilometres (37 mi) South of the downtown of Lebel-sur-Quévillon.

The main hydrographic slopes adjacent to Waswanipi Lake are:

- North side: Waswanipi River, Nomans River, Waswanipi River;
- East side: Bachelor River, Bachelor Lake, Taylor Creek;
- South side: O'Sullivan River, Pusticamica Lake;
- West side: Iserhoff River, Iserhoff River North, Goéland Lake (Waswanipi River).

In the shape of a "V", Waswanipi Lake is about 80 kilometres (50 mi) Southeast of Matagami Lake and 20 kilometres (12 mi) Southeast of Goéland Lake (Waswanipi River); the Waswanipi River crosses these two bodies of water.

With a length of 39.4 kilometres (24.5 mi) and a maximum width of 13.4 kilometres (8.3 mi), lake Waswanipi is just over 205 kilometres (127.38 mi).

== See also ==
- Waswanipi River, un cours d'eau
- Waswanipi, a Cri village
