= Senneterre =

- Town
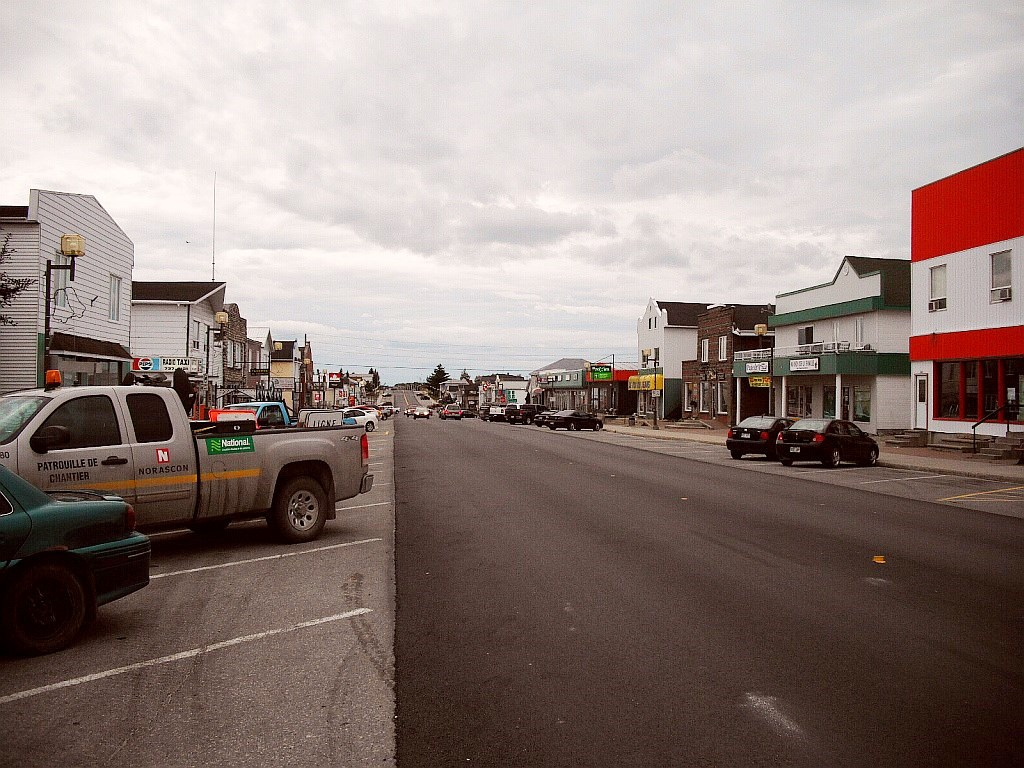
- Road 113 in Senneterre

- Coat of arms
- Motto: Saine terre attire ("Healthy land attracts")
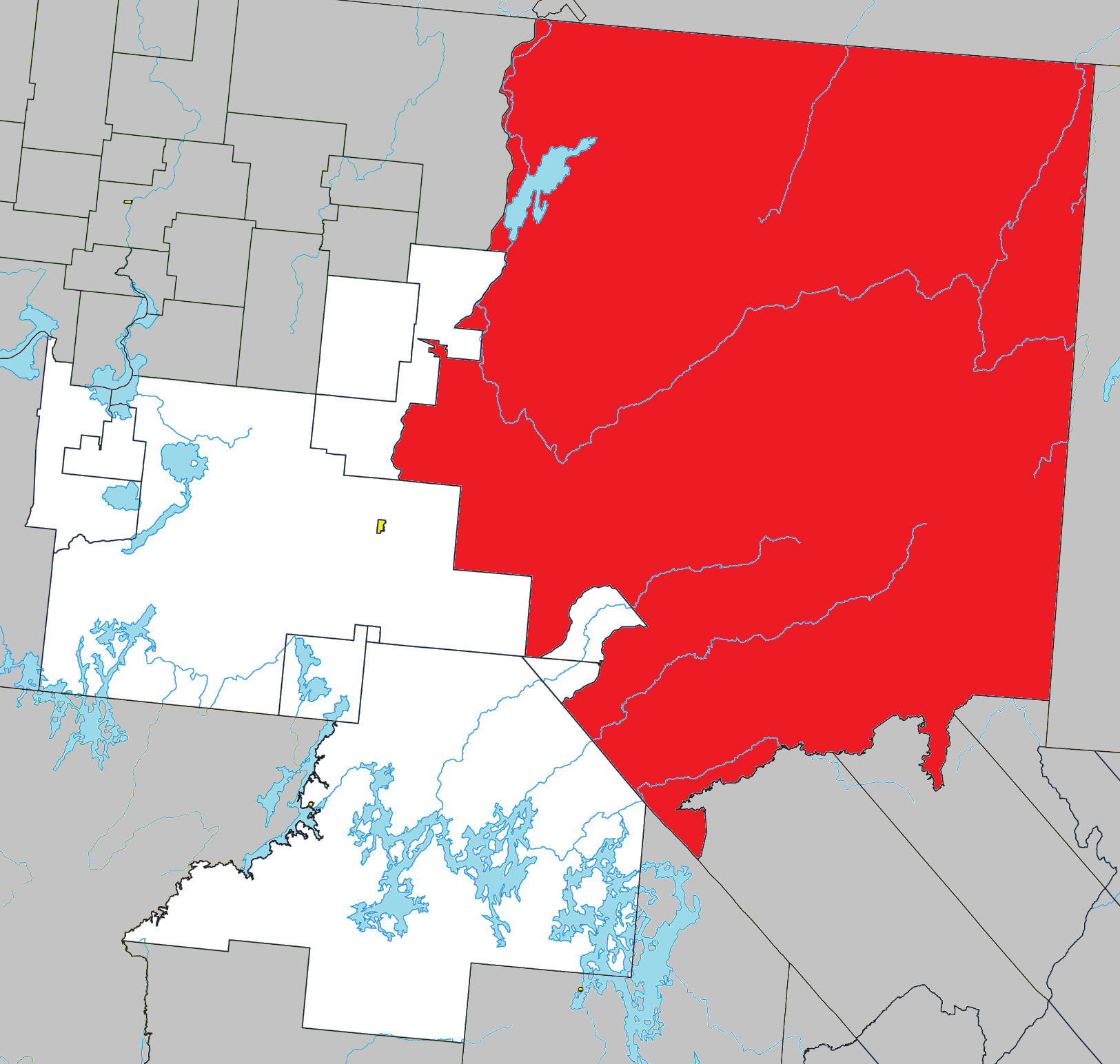
- Location within La Vallée-de-l'Or RCM

- Location in western Quebec
- Coordinates: 48°23′N 77°14′W
- Country: Canada
- Province: Quebec
- Region: Abitibi-Témiscamingue
- RCM: La Vallée-de-l'Or
- Settled: 1904
- Constituted: June 13, 1919

Government
  - Mayor: Nathalie-Ann Pelchat
  - Federal riding: Abitibi—Baie-James— Nunavik—Eeyou
  - Prov. riding: Abitibi-Est

Area
  - Town: 16,457.05 km^{2} (6,354.10 sq mi)
  - Land: 14,892.00 km^{2} (5,749.83 sq mi)
  - Urban: 3.07 km^{2} (1.19 sq mi)

Population (2021)
  - Town: 2,782
  - Density: 0.2/km^{2} (0.52/sq mi)
  - Urban: 2,212
  - Urban density: 721/km^{2} (1,870/sq mi)
  - Pop (2016-21): ▼3.0%
  - Dwellings: 1,534
- Time zone: UTC−05:00 (EST)
  - Summer (DST): UTC−04:00 (EDT)
- Postal code(s): J0Y 2M0
- Area code: 819
- Highways: R-113 R-386
- Website: www.ville.senneterre.qc.ca

Senneterre (French pronunciation: [sɛntɛʁ]) is a town in the Abitibi-Témiscamingue region of northwestern Quebec, Canada. It is in La Vallée-de-l'Or Regional County Municipality.

There are three schools in the town: St-Paul elementary school, Chanoine-Delisle elementary school and La Concorde High school. The town centre is mainly surrounded by Parent Lake and Tiblemont Lake. The main street of the town is called Avenue 10e (10th Avenue). The arena is named Centre sportif André Dubé. The economy of the town is mainly based on forestry.

== History ==
While the site first served as a trading post, real colonization began in 1904 when the first permanent settlers arrived. It was first identified as Rivière-Nottaway, then Rivière-Bell. Over the next 10 years, there were only a few residents who were joined by people fleeing conscription. Between 1911 and 1913 when the National Transcontinental Railway was being constructed, the area was surveyed and the geographic township of Senneterre was formed, named in honour of a captain of the Régiment de Languedoc that fought in the Battle of Sainte-Foy.

The completion of the railway accelerated the development of the place. In 1914, the Parish of Saint-Paul-de-Senneterre was founded, and in 1919, the place was incorporated as the Township Municipality of Senneterre-Partie-Ouest, named after the township and its relative position therein. It developed into a center for forestry, commerce and tourism.

In 1948, it shortened its name to Senneterre and changed status to village municipality, while gaining town status in 1956. In 1953, CFS Senneterre opened, home to the No. 34 Aircraft Control & Warning Squadron and part of the Pinetree Line chain of radar stations. After the closure of CFS Val-d'Or in 1976, the base also served as the Search and Rescue centre for north-western Quebec. In 1988, CFS Senneterre was closed.

On July 6, 1996, the Town of Senneterre was greatly expanded from 114.45 km^{2} (44.19 sq mi) to 14,887.03 km^{2} (5,747.91 sq mi) when the unorganized territories of Lac-Quentin and Lac-Mingo and almost all of the unorganized territories of Matchi-Manitou and Lac-Bricault were added to its jurisdiction. From that day until La Tuque's amalgamation in 2002, it was in terms of area the second largest incorporated entity in Quebec after Baie-James and the largest with town status in Quebec.

== Geography ==
The town's territory includes a vast undeveloped area stretching from the Bell River to the Mauricie region. The town centre itself (48°23′30″N 77°14′20″W) covers just over 3 km^{2} (1.2 sq mi) of its 16,457 km^{2} (6,354 sq mi) total area, and is about 60 kilometres (37 mi) northeast of Val-d'Or on the banks of the Bell River, at the intersection of the Canadian National Railway and Quebec Route 113.

=== Communities ===
In addition to Senneterre centre, the town's territory includes the following hamlets or rail stops, all located along the Canadian National Railway:

- Forsyth (48°14′14″N 76°25′40″W)
- Gagnon-Siding (48°15′12″N 76°08′45″W)
- Langlade (48°13′50″N 75°58′25″W)
- Monet (48°10′06″N 75°38′36″W)
- Paradis (48°13′33″N 76°35′14″W)
- Press (48°14′35″N 76°43′57″W)

== Demographics ==
In the 2021 Census of Population conducted by Statistics Canada, Senneterre had a population of 2,782 living in 1,390 of its 1,534 total private dwellings, a change of −3% from its 2016 population of 2,868. With a land area of 14,718.51 km^{2} (5,682.85 sq mi), it had a population density of 0.2/km^{2} (0.5/sq mi) in 2021.

Canada census – Senneterre community profile

	2021	2016	2011
Population	2,782 (-3.0% from 2016)	2,868 (-2.9% from 2011)	2,953 (-1.3% from 2006)
Land area	14,718.51 km^{2} (5,682.85 sq mi)	14,889.93 km^{2} (5,749.03 sq mi)	14,892.00 km^{2} (5,749.83 sq mi)
Population density	0.2/km^{2} (0.52/sq mi)	0.2/km^{2} (0.52/sq mi)	0.2/km^{2} (0.52/sq mi)
Median age	48.8 (M: 48.4, F: 48.8)	47.1 (M: 46.6, F: 47.7)	44.5 (M: 43.5, F: 45.3)
Private dwellings	1,534 (total) 1,390 (occupied)	1,448 (total) 1,352 (occupied)	1,418 (total) 1,332 (occupied)
Median household income	$58,800	$48,213	$54,124

References: 2021 2016 2011

Historical census populations – Senneterre

Year	Pop.	±%
1921	765	—
1931	611	−20.1%
1941	687	+12.4%
1951	1,686	+145.4%
1956	2,197	+30.3%
1961	3,246	+47.7%

Year	Pop.	±%
1966	3,567	+9.9%
1971	4,303	+20.6%
1976	4,289	−0.3%
1981	4,339	+1.2%
1986	4,017	−7.4%
1991	3,563	−11.3%

Year	Pop.	±%
1996	3,488	−2.1%
2001	3,275	−6.1%
2006	2,993	−8.6%
2011	2,953	−1.3%
2016	2,868	−2.9%
2021	2,782	−3.0%

Population figures are not adjusted for boundary changes. Figures prior to 1948 are for Senneterre-Ouest.
Source: Statistics Canada

Mother tongue (2021):

- English as first language: 2.0%
- French as first language: 95.3%
- English and French as first language: 0.9%
- Other as first language: 1.4%

== Government ==
City council (2023):

- Mayor: Nathalie-Ann Pelchat
- Councilors: Francine Trottier, René Paquin, Louise Allaire, Danio Fournier, Marie-Pier Pelletier, Véronique Perrier

List of former mayors:

- Louis-Paul Dionne (1968–1978)
- Paul Mailhot (1978–1986)
- Denis Sawyer (1986–1988)
- Gérald Lafontaine (1988–1998)
- Jean-Maurice Matte (1998–2021)
- Nathalie-Ann Pelchat (2021–present)

== Transportation ==
The town is served by Via Rail Canada’s Montreal–Senneterre route, with Senneterre station being the terminal. The train leaves Montreal Central Station toward Senneterre every Monday, Wednesday and Friday, and returns to Montreal on Tuesday, Thursday and Sunday.

Two highways, Route 113 and Route 386, connects the town with the rest of Quebec, with the former connecting to the Trans-Canada Highway (Route 117 in Quebec).
