= Lebel-sur-Quévillon =

- City
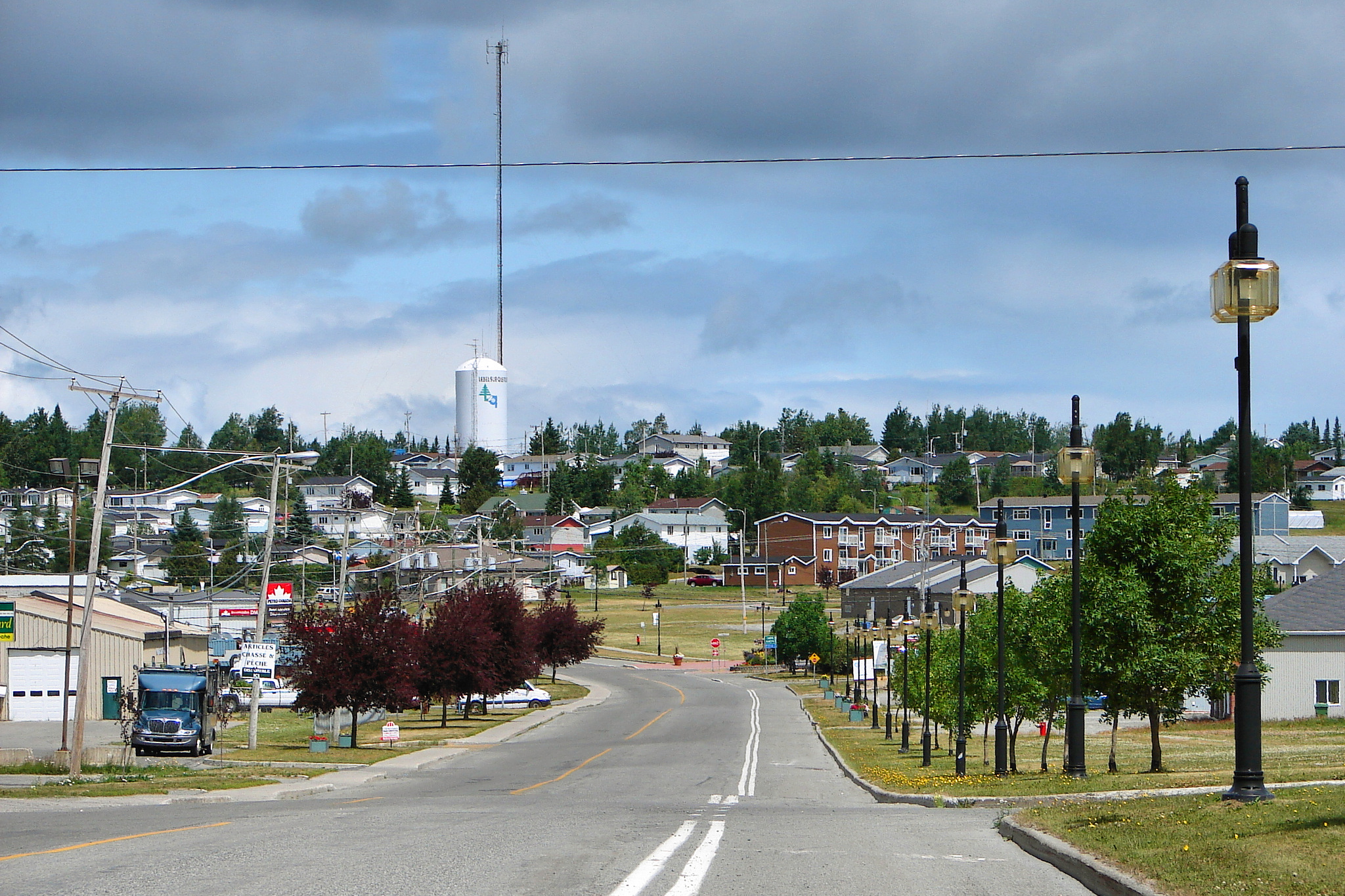

- Coat of arms

- Location within Quebec
- Coordinates (500, place Quévillon): 49°03′N 76°59′W
- Country: Canada
- Province: Quebec
- Region: Nord-du-Québec
- RCM: None
- Settled: 1965
- Constituted: August 6, 1965

Government
  - Mayor: Guy Lafrenière
  - Federal riding: Abitibi—Baie-James—Nunavik—Eeyou
  - Prov. riding: Ungava

Area
  - City: 42.60 km^{2} (16.45 sq mi)
  - Land: 44.41 km^{2} (17.15 sq mi)
  - Urban: 2.33 km^{2} (0.90 sq mi)
- Elevation: 304.50 m (999.0 ft)

Population (2021)
  - City: 2,091
  - Density: 47.1/km^{2} (122/sq mi)
  - Urban: 1,931
  - Urban density: 828.5/km^{2} (2,146/sq mi)
  - Pop 2016-2021: ▼4.4%
  - Dwellings: 1,161
- Time zone: UTC−5 (EST)
  - Summer (DST): UTC−4 (EDT)
- Postal code(s): J0Y 1X0
- Area code: 819
- Highways: R-113
- Website: www.lsq.quebec

Lebel-sur-Quévillon (French pronunciation: [ləbɛl syʁ kevijɔ̃]) is a city in the Canadian province of Quebec, located on Route 113 in the Jamésie region. It is located approximately 88 kilometres north of Senneterre and approximately 200 kilometres southwest of Chibougamau. It is surrounded by, but not a part of, the local municipality of Eeyou Istchee James Bay. It is constituted from unorganized territories.

The town had a population of 2,091 as of the Canada 2021 Census and is served by the Lebel-sur-Quévillon Airport. The hamlet of Rapide-des-Cèdres is also within its municipal boundary.

The name "Lebel" is in honor of Jean-Baptiste Lebel, a forestry contractor, born in 1887 and died in 1966 who worked for years to set up a paper mill in the north of the province. The lake gives the second part of its name to the city. Lac Quévillon is named in honor of Louis-Amable Quévillon (1749-1823), an architect and sculptor of religious objects.

== History ==
The town, built on the Quevillon Lake Peninsula, was built as a mono-industrial logging town to accommodate employees of a pulp mill reliant on the surrounding forest industries, Dominion Tar Pulp and Chemical Plant (Domtar). At the end of August 1966, the first inhabitants arrived in the future village which had a 5 year lead time for construction. The layout of these streets was in the shape of a tree, each with the name of a deciduous tree or a conifer. In 1971, the population reached 3000 inhabitants and 4300 including the surrounding settlements. In 1974, Domtar installed a sawmill close to its pulp mill and a new neighborhood emerged. The small city remained mono-industrial for several decades, with the only well-paid jobs at Domtar.

There were several labour disputes, however with major effects on the population. In 1975, there was a 6-month strike at Domtar, followed by another at the sawmill operations in 1977. In June 1984 and May 1985, strike in the pulp mill paralyzed the whole town. In 1988, another 4-month strike began at the beginning of the year. There was then no union action for 16 years.

A new employer began in 1994 c30 km away: the Langlois zinc and copper mine operated by Canadian company Cambior. In 2000, it was sold to Breakwater Resources ltd. In 2008, on November 2, the Langlois mine was temporarily shut down due to the fall in the price of zinc. In February 2010, it reopened and in the summer of 2011, Breakwater was bought by Nyrstar. It was closed under a 'care and maintenance' agreement in 2019, citing difficulties in maintaining profitable underground operations, with the loss of over 300 jobs.

Domtar suspended kraft paper operations on 24 November 2005 citing declining profits, employees were locked out of the plant, and the announcement of its final closure was made on December 18, 2008. The effect on 700 employees and their families was enormous. within 10 years, the population had dropped from 3300 to 2300 and emigration continued. On January 31, 2012 the former Domtar plant was bought by Fortress Paper to produce cellulose used in clothing, a growing market around the world to replace cotton. The promise was 333 direct and 400 indirect jobs. This lasted until 2016 when the plant, with its hydroelectric facility, was sold to Nexolia Bioenergy. and there was a further sale in 2019 to Chantiers Chibougamau (which has a Government of Quebec minority stake).

Commentators report a feeling among the remaining population that the town had a 'golden age' when Domtar was in peak operations from ther 1980s to the early 2000s, with a sense of 'abandonment' thereafter In 2001, the average income of a household in Quévillon was just over C$70,000 compared to $49,998 for the whole Province. The subsequent loss of industrial jobs led to high mortality, emigration, and cuts to basic services as well as efforts to seek other employment. into the 2000s, employment levels are much lower than in the 'Golden Age'.

Efforts to revitalise the town include the establishment of CKCJ-FM, Lebel-sur-Quévillon's first local community radio station, launched in 2018. In addition, economic diversification has involved attracting tourism, rebranding the town under a Visages régionaux brand, aided by publicity.

In June 2023 there was a serious forest fire, leading to evacuation of the town for a month.

== Geography ==
Lebel-sur-Quévillon is located 88 kilometres (55 mi) northeast of Senneterre and 151 kilometres (94 mi) northeast of Val-d'Or. It is accessed by route 113 which links Lac Saint-Jean to Abitibi via Chapais and Chibougamau.

Located on the southern edge of the administrative region of Nord-du-Quebec, the village of Lebel-sur-Quévillon is enclosed entirely by Eeyou Istchee James Bay. The village is located on a peninsula at the southwest of Quevillon Lake. This lake of 12.6 kilometres (7.8 mi) in length resembles a heart. Lake Quévillon is mainly supplied by the Wilson River (Quevillon Lake), which empties on the north-east shore of the lake.

=== Climate ===
Lebel-sur-Quévillon has a humid continental climate (Dfb) bordering closely on a subarctic climate (Dfc). Summers are short, but warm with cool nights and plentiful rainfall. Winters are long, bitterly cold, and very snowy, with yearly snowfall averaging 225.6 cm (88.8 inches). Precipitation peaks from July to September, with July being the wettest month of the year.

Climate data for Lebel-sur-Quévillon
Month	Jan	Feb	Mar	Apr	May	Jun	Jul	Aug	Sep	Oct	Nov	Dec	Year
Record high °C (°F)	10.5 (50.9)	10.0 (50.0)	16.5 (61.7)	28.0 (82.4)	32.2 (90.0)	33.5 (92.3)	34.4 (93.9)	33.9 (93.0)	31.1 (88.0)	26.1 (79.0)	15.0 (59.0)	13.0 (55.4)	34.4 (93.9)
Mean daily maximum °C (°F)	−12.0 (10.4)	−9.7 (14.5)	−2.3 (27.9)	6.6 (43.9)	15.3 (59.5)	20.6 (69.1)	23.1 (73.6)	21.4 (70.5)	15.5 (59.9)	7.7 (45.9)	−0.6 (30.9)	−8.4 (16.9)	6.4 (43.5)
Daily mean °C (°F)	−17.7 (0.1)	−16.1 (3.0)	−8.6 (16.5)	0.8 (33.4)	8.9 (48.0)	14.2 (57.6)	17.1 (62.8)	15.7 (60.3)	10.6 (51.1)	3.9 (39.0)	−4.0 (24.8)	−13.2 (8.2)	1.0 (33.8)
Mean daily minimum °C (°F)	−23.4 (−10.1)	−22.4 (−8.3)	−15.0 (5.0)	−5.0 (23.0)	2.4 (36.3)	7.9 (46.2)	11.2 (52.2)	10.1 (50.2)	5.7 (42.3)	0.0 (32.0)	−7.4 (18.7)	−17.9 (−0.2)	−4.5 (23.9)
Record low °C (°F)	−43.0 (−45.4)	−42.2 (−44.0)	−40.0 (−40.0)	−26.7 (−16.1)	−13.9 (7.0)	−3.9 (25.0)	−1.7 (28.9)	−2.0 (28.4)	−7.8 (18.0)	−13.5 (7.7)	−28.9 (−20.0)	−40.0 (−40.0)	−43.0 (−45.4)
Average precipitation mm (inches)	52.4 (2.06)	29.6 (1.17)	44.5 (1.75)	58.0 (2.28)	75.3 (2.96)	98.0 (3.86)	122.9 (4.84)	108.2 (4.26)	119.3 (4.70)	91.1 (3.59)	71.1 (2.80)	58.5 (2.30)	929.4 (36.59)
Average rainfall mm (inches)	1.9 (0.07)	2.0 (0.08)	11.7 (0.46)	40.6 (1.60)	73.0 (2.87)	97.8 (3.85)	122.9 (4.84)	108.2 (4.26)	119.0 (4.69)	82.5 (3.25)	37.7 (1.48)	6.4 (0.25)	703.8 (27.71)
Average snowfall cm (inches)	50.4 (19.8)	27.6 (10.9)	32.8 (12.9)	17.3 (6.8)	2.3 (0.9)	0.2 (0.1)	0 (0)	0 (0)	0.3 (0.1)	8.5 (3.3)	34.0 (13.4)	52.1 (20.5)	225.6 (88.8)
Average precipitation days (≥ 0.2 mm)	14.3	9.6	10.9	11.5	13.3	14.7	16.7	16.5	18.9	17.1	16.2	15.8	175.4
Average rainy days (≥ 0.2 mm)	0.73	0.78	3.4	8.0	12.9	14.7	16.7	16.5	18.8	15.2	6.0	1.5	115.1
Average snowy days (≥ 0.2 cm)	13.8	9.1	8.2	5.0	0.96	0.09	0	0	0.27	3.2	11.6	14.8	67.0
Source: Environment Canada

== Demographics ==
Historical Census Data - Lebel-sur-Quévillon, Quebec
Year	Pop.	±%
1966	392	—
1971	2,936	+649.0%
1976	3,591	+22.3%
1981	3,682	+2.5%
1986	3,465	−5.9%
1991	3,414	−1.5%
1996	3,416	+0.1%
2001	3,236	−5.3%
2006	2,729	−15.7%
2011	2,159	−20.9%
2016	2,187	+1.3%
2021	2,091	−4.4%

In the 2021 Census of Population conducted by Statistics Canada, Lebel-sur-Quévillon had a population of 2,091 living in 942 of its 1,161 total private dwellings, a change of −4.4% from its 2016 population of 2,187. With a land area of 44.41 km^{2} (17.15 sq mi), it had a population density of 47.1/km^{2} (121.9/sq mi) in 2021.

Mother tongue:

- English as first language: 1.2%
- French as first language: 95.9%
- English and French as first language: 0.5%
- Other as first language: 2.4%

Scholars have interviewed a range of older residents and new arrivals. Attracted by regional programs and jobs, newer immigrants came during the life of the mine from francophone countries as far away as Haiti and Cameroon and from elsewhere in Quebec, but linked to changing job opportunities that are currently constrained. They are aided an NGO, Agora Boreale, but could struggle with rental housing in an established community of Indigenous and non-Indigenous residents.

== See also ==
- Bell River (Quebec), a river
- Jamésie
- Nord-du-Québec, administrative region of Québec
- List of towns in Quebec
