= Achepabanca River North-East =

Achepabanca North-East
- Watershed of Nottaway River

Location
- Country: Canada
- Province: Quebec
- Region: Abitibi-Témiscamingue

Physical characteristics
- Source: Unidentified Lake
  - location: Senneterre, La Vallée-de-l'Or Regional County Municipality (RCM), Abitibi-Témiscamingue, Quebec
  - coordinates: 48°38′29″N 76°08′35″W
  - elevation: 399 m (1,309 ft)
- Mouth: Mégiscane River, Girouard Lake
  - location: Senneterre, La Vallée-de-l'Or Regional County Municipality, Abitibi-Témiscamingue, Quebec
  - coordinates: 48°33′10″N 76°15′30″W
  - elevation: 399 m (1,309 ft)
- Length: 21.9 km (13.6 mi)

The Achepabanca River Northeast is a tributary of the Achepabanca River, flowing into the northeastern part of Senneterre within La Vallée-de-l'Or Regional County Municipality (RCM), in the administrative region of Abitibi-Témiscamingue, in Quebec, in Canada.

The course of the river successively crosses the townships of Maricourt and Berthelot. Its confluence is at the limit of the townships Girouard and Berthelot.

The Northeastern Achepabanca River runs entirely on forest land on the west side of the Gouin Reservoir. Forestry is the main economic activity of this hydrographic slope; recreational tourism activities, second. The surface of the river is usually frozen from the beginning of December to the end of April. The hydrographic slope of the Northeastern Achepabanca River is served by the R0808 forest road which passes on the north side.

== Geography ==
The Northeastern Achepabanca River originates near the northern limit of the Abitibi-Témiscamingue administrative region, at the mouth of the unidentified lake (length: 0.8 kilometres (0.50 mi); elevation: 399 metres (1,309 ft)). This head lake is enclosed by three mountains whose peaks reach 490 metres (1,610 ft) in the North, 473 metres (1,552 ft) in the South and 470 metres (1,540 ft).

This source of the river is located at:

- 0.5 kilometres (0.31 mi) north-west of the R0808 road, which runs south-east of Achepabanca Lake and intersects the upper reaches of the Achepabanca Northeast River;
- 13.0 kilometres (8.1 mi) north-east of the confluence of the Achepabanca River Northeast with the Mégiscane River;
- 75.7 kilometres (47.0 mi) north-east of the confluence of the Mégiscane River with Parent Lake (Abitibi);
- 85.9 kilometres (53.4 mi) north-east of downtown Senneterre;
- 49.9 kilometres (31.0 mi) north of the Forsythe Railway Stop at the Canadian National Railway.

The main hydrographic slopes near the Achepabanca River Northeast are:

- North side: Machepabanca Lake, Lake Saint-Père;
- East side: Mégiscane River, Maricourt Lake (Macho River), Macho River, Berthelot Lake (Mégiscane River);
- South side: Mégiscane River, Girouard Lake, Berthelot Lake;
- West side: Achepabanca River, Capousacataca River, Lake Charrette, Valets Lake.

From the mouth of the head lake, the Northeastern River Achepabanca flows over 21.9 kilometres (13.6 mi) according to the following segments:

Upper Achepabanca River Northeast (segment of 7.2 kilometres (4.5 mi))

- 0.4 kilometres (0.25 mi) westerly, including crossing the western part of an unidentified lake (length: 0.7 kilometres (0.43 mi) in the form of a cruiser open to the north; 399 metres (1,309 ft)), to its mouth;
- 3.9 kilometres (2.4 mi) southwesterly, crossing a small unidentified lake (elevation: 386 metres (1,266 ft)) at the end of the segment, to its mouth;
- 0.8 kilometres (0.50 mi) southwesterly to the northeastern shore of Cibâtikocik Lake;
- 2.1 kilometres (1.3 mi) crossing the Cibâtikocik Lake (elevation: 382 metres (1,253 ft)) on its full length;

Lower course of the Northeastern Achepabanca River (segment of 14.7 kilometres (9.1 mi))

- 3.6 kilometres (2.2 mi) to the south forming some serpentines;
- 4.6 kilometres (2.9 mi) southwesterly, crossing a lake formed by the widening of the river;
- to the south-east crossing a lake (length: 4.1 kilometres (2.5 mi); altitude: 390 metres (1,280 ft)) formed by the widening of the river, to its mouth;
- 1.7 kilometres (1.1 mi) southwesterly across the southwestern portion of an unidentified lake (elevation: 390 metres (1,280 ft)) over its full length;
- 0.7 kilometres (0.43 mi) southwesterly to the confluence of the river

The Achepabanca Northeast River discharges on the east bank of the Achepabanca River at 0.4 kilometres (0.25 mi) from the confluence of the latter with the Mégiscane River. The latter usually flows westward forming a large hook to the south. It is a tributary of the east shore of Parent Lake (Abitibi). It empties into the Bell River, a tributary of Matagami Lake which in turn flows into the Nottaway River, a tributary of the southeastern shore of James Bay.

This confluence of the Northeastern Achepabanca River with the Achepabanca River is located at:

- 0.4 kilometres (0.25 mi) north of the confluence of the Achepabanca River;
- 66.1 kilometres (41.1 mi) north-east of the confluence of the Mégiscane River with Parent Lake (Abitibi);
- 37.4 kilometres (23.2 mi) north of the Foresyth railway stop on the Canadian National Railway;
- 75.8 kilometres (47.1 mi) north-east of the village center of Senneterre;
- 77.8 kilometres (48.3 mi) south-east of the village center of Lebel-sur-Quévillon;
- 61.1 kilometres (38.0 mi) west of Gouin Reservoir.
- 2.1 kilometres (1.3 mi) north of Girouard Lake.

== Toponymy ==
The toponym "Northeastern Achepabanca River" was formalized on December 5, 1968, at the Commission de toponymie du Québec.

== See also ==
- Nottaway River, a watercourse
- Matagami Lake, a body of water
- Bell River, a watercourse
- Parent Lake (Abitibi), a body of water
- Mégiscane River, a watercourse
- Achepabanca River, a watercourse
- Gouin Reservoir, a body of water
- Senneterre, a city
- La Vallée-de-l'Or Regional County Municipality (RCM)
- List of rivers of Quebec
