= La Petite Rivière (Taschereau River tributary) =

Location
- Country: Canada
- Province: Quebec
- Region: Abitibi-Témiscamingue
- Regional County Municipality: Abitibi Regional County Municipality
- Municipality: Baie-James

Physical characteristics
- Source: Tiblemont Lake
  - location: Sutton
  - coordinates: 48°42′12″N 77°10′27″W
  - elevation: 310 m (1,020 ft)
- Mouth: Taschereau River
  - location: Lac-Despinassy (unorganized territory)
  - coordinates: 48°48′57″N 77°10′27″W
  - elevation: 295 m (968 ft)
- Length: 15.6 km (9.7 mi)

Basin features
- Progression: Taschereau River, Bell River, Matagami Lake, Nottaway River
- Tributaries
  - left: (Upstream) Véract brook, Lalanne brook, Indian river (Bell River), Kâmitciteyak lake outlet, Esturgeon River, Daniel River, Octikwakane brook, Kâpiskagamacik brook, Kâw Gracebîyak River, Bigniba River, Laflamme River, Kâk River, Castor stream, Laas River, Taschereau River, Swanson stream, Boucane River, Raymond brook, Lemoine brook, Paquin brook, Peupliers River.
  - right: (Upstream) Shallow Lake outlet, Baptiste River, Sinclair Creek, Florence River, Wedding River, Wajatawaka Creek, Pônabî Creek, Pigojic Creek, Quévillon River, Cuvillier River, Gilbert Creek, Robin River (lake Parent), Delestres River, rivière du Hibou (Parent Lake), Brassier River, Mégiscane River, Senneterre River.

La Petite Rivière (English: Little River) is a tributary of the east bank of the Taschereau River (Bell River) flowing in the unorganized territory of Lac-Despinassy, in the Abitibi Regional County Municipality, in the administrative region of Abitibi-Témiscamingue, in Quebec, in Canada.

La Petite Rivière flows mainly in forest and marshland in the cantons of Ducros and Bartouille. Forestry is the main economic activity in this watershed. The river surface is usually frozen from mid-December to mid-April.

== Geography ==
The neighboring watersheds of La Petite Rivière are:

- north side: Taschereau River, Bell River;
- east side: Swanson stream, Bell river;
- south side: Ducros River, Peupliers River, Boucane River, Pascalis River, Tiblemont Lake, Courville River;
- west side: Taschereau river, Laflamme River.

La Petite Rivière has its source in the unorganized territory of Lac-Despinassy in a forest area with a few marshes.

This source is located 8.5 kilometres (5.3 mi) west of Parent Lake, 12.5 kilometres (7.8 mi) south of the confluence of La Petite River, 35.0 kilometres (21.7 mi) north of downtown Senneterre and 18.2 kilometres (11.3 mi) south of the confluence of the Taschereau River.

From its source, the course of La Petite Rivière generally flows north over 15.6 kilometres (9.7 mi), collecting the waters of a stream (coming from the south-east), up to its confluence.

The Petite Rivière flows onto the east bank of the Taschereau River. This confluence of La Petite Rivière is located at:

- 6.2 kilometres (3.9 mi) south of the mouth of the Taschereau River;
- 3.0 kilometres (1.9 mi) south-east of the railway;
- 14 kilometres (8.7 mi) north-west of the mouth of Lake Parent;
- 29.4 kilometres (18.3 mi) south of the village center of Lebel-sur-Quévillon;
- 47.8 kilometres (29.7 mi) north of downtown Senneterre;

== Toponymy ==
In toponymy, the expression Petite Rivière is normally correlated with a larger river, in this case the Taschereau River.

The toponym La Petite Rivière was formalized on December 5, 1968 at the Commission de toponymie du Québec, that is when it was created.

== Appendices ==
=== Related articles ===
- James Bay
- Rupert Bay
- Nottaway River, a stream
- Matagami Lake, a body of water
- Bell River, a stream
- Taschereau River (Bell River tributary), a stream
- Lac-Despinassy, an Unorganized territory (Canada)
- Abitibi Regional County Municipality
- List of rivers of Quebec
