= Mesplet Lake =

- Watershed of Nottaway River

- Location within Quebec
- Location: Senneterre
- Coordinates: 48°46′11″N 75°47′10″W
- Type: Reservoir lake
- Primary inflows: from North: outlet of a set of lakes including Frank, Walley, Bud and « Lac aux Loutres »; from South-West: outlet of a set of about 20 lakes.
- Primary outflows: Mesplet Pass.
- Basin countries: Canada
- Max. length: 20.3 kilometres (12.6 mi)
- Max. width: 4.2 kilometres (2.6 mi)
- Surface elevation: 393 metres (1,289 ft)

Mesplet Lake is a freshwater body in the north-eastern part of Senneterre in Vallée-de-l'Or Regional County Municipality (RCM), in the administrative region of Abitibi-Témiscamingue, in the province of Quebec, in Canada.

Mesplet Lake is located in the township of Mesplet and Masères. Forestry is the main economic activity of the sector. Recreational tourism activities come second. Mesplet Lake is part of the Saint-Cyr Lake Biodiversity Reserve.

The Mesplet Lake hydrographic slope is accessible via a forest road (North-South direction) that passes on the east side of the Saint-Cyr River Valley; in addition, another forest road (East-West direction) serves the north of the Saint-Cyr Lake Biodiversity Reserve.

The surface of Mesplet Lake is usually frozen from early November to mid-May, however, safe ice circulation is generally from mid-November to mid-April.

== Geography ==
Mesplet Lake has a total length of 20.3 kilometres (12.6 mi) and a maximum width of 4.2 kilometres (2.6 mi). On the Northeast side, this lake has a marsh area. The surface of this lake is an altitude: 393 metres (1,289 ft) like other surrounding water bodies. Having a complex configuration, this lake resembles a large recumbent S whose end to the northwest is formed by the Bay of Cedars (length: 4.1 kilometres (2.5 mi)) and "Baie de la Truite" (English: Trout Bay) (length: 2.3 kilometres (1.4 mi)). The southeastern extremity has a bay (length: 3.1 kilometres (1.9 mi)) surrounded by marshes.

The mouth of Mesplet Lake is located in the center of the south shore of the lake. From there, the current crosses southwards the "Mesplet Pass" (length: 2.1 kilometres (1.3 mi)), which connects it to Cherrier Lake. This mouth of Lake Mesplet is at: North of the mouth of Cherrier Lake;

- 19.2 kilometres (11.9 mi) north-east of the confluence of the Saint-Cyr River South with the Mégiscane River;
- 24.1 kilometres (15.0 mi) north-east of the mouth of the Mégiscane Lake which is crossed by the Mégiscane River;
- 106.1 kilometres (65.9 mi) north-east of the mouth of the Mégiscane River (confluence with Parent Lake (Abitibi);
- 360.4 kilometres (223.9 mi) south-east of the mouth of the Nottaway River (confluence with Rupert Bay);
- 62.2 kilometres (38.6 mi) west of the village center of Obedjiwan;
- 95.5 kilometres (59.3 mi) east of the village center of Lebel-sur-Quévillon.

The main hydrographic slopes near Mesplet Lake are:

- north side: Loutres Lake, Macho River, Panache River, Fortier River (Panache River tributary);
- east side: Robertine Lake, Barry Lake (Saint-Cyr River South), Bailly Lake (Saint-Cyr River South), Saint-Cyr River South, Aigle River (Doda Lake), Pascagama River;
- south side: Cherrier Lake, Saint-Cyr River South, Canusio Lake, Mégiscane Lake, Mégiscane River, Kekek River;
- west side: Masères Lake, Closse River, Macho River, Wetetnagami River, Mégiscane River.

== Toponymy ==
The "Mesplet Lake" hydronym is linked to that of the township of Mesplet.

The toponym "lac Mesplet" was officialized on December 5, 1968 by the Commission de toponymie du Québec, when it was created.

== See also ==
- James Bay
- Nottaway River, a watercourse
- Matagami Lake, a body of water
- Bell River, a watercourse
- Parent Lake (Abitibi), a body of water
- Mégiscane River, a watercourse
- Saint-Cyr River South, a watercourse
- Cherrier Lake, a watercourse
- Senneterre, a city
- Saint-Cyr Lake Biodiversity Reserve, a protected area
- List of lakes in Canada
