= Saint-Cyr Lake (Saint-Cyr River South) =

Lake in Senneterre, Quebec, Canada

- Watershed of Nottaway River

- Location within Quebec
- Location: Eeyou Istchee James Bay (mconvertcipality)
- Coordinates: 48°44′00″N 75°41′55″W
- Type: Natural
- Primary inflows: Saint-Cyr River South, Chartrand River
- Primary outflows: Saint-Cyr River South.
- Basin countries: Canada
- Max. length: 18.7 kilometres (11.6 mi)
- Max. width: 3.2 kilometres (2.0 mi)
- Surface elevation: 393 metres (1,289 ft)

Saint-Cyr Lake /ˌseɪntˈsɪər/ is a freshwater body of water crossed by the Saint-Cyr River South in the north-eastern part of Senneterre, in La Vallée-de-l'Or Regional County Municipality (RCM), in the administrative region of Abitibi-Témiscamingue, in the province of Quebec, in Canada.

This body of water extends in the townships of Mesplet and Cherrier. Forestry is the main economic activity of the sector. Recreational tourism activities come second.

The hydrographic slope of Lake Saint-Cyr is accessible through a forest road (North-South direction) on the east side of the Saint-Cyr River Valley; in addition, another forest road (East-West direction) serves the northern part of the Saint-Cyr Lake Biodiversity Reserve and connects R1015 to the west.

The surface of Lac Saint-Cyr is usually frozen from early November to mid-May, however, safe ice circulation is generally from mid-November to mid-April.

== Geography ==
Lake Saint-Cyr has a total length of 18.7 kilometres (11.6 mi) (including 12.4 kilometres (7.7 mi) in the Township of Mesplet and 6.3 kilometres (3.9 mi) in the Township of Cherrier. The surface of this lake is an elevation: 393 metres (1,289 ft), facing north-east, of which 4.0 kilometres (2.5 mi) in the canton of Cherrier, 14.9 kilometres (9.3 mi) in Belmont Township, and 1.7 kilometres (1.1 mi) in Kalm Township.

This lake is fed by the Chartrand River (coming from the East) and by the Saint-Cyr River South which crosses it to the South-West on 16.3 kilometres (10.1 mi). The Saint-Cyr River is itself fed by Barry Lake (Saint-Cyr River South) and Bailly Lake (Saint-Cyr River South).

The mouth of Lake Saint-Cyr is located on the west shore of the southern part of the lake, namely: North of the mouth of the Saint-Cyr River;

- 15.3 kilometres (9.5 mi) north-east of the mouth of Mégiscane Lake;
- 107.1 kilometres (66.5 mi) north-east of the mouth of the Mégiscane River (confluence with Parent Lake (Abitibi) / Bell River);
- 182.7 kilometres (113.5 mi) south-east of downtown Matagami;
- 368 kilometres (229 mi) south-east of the mouth of the Nottaway River;
- 101.6 kilometres (63.1 mi) east of the village center of Lebel-sur-Quévillon;
- 58.5 kilometres (36.4 mi) west of Obedjiwan village center.

The main hydrographic slopes near Lac Saint-Cyr are:

- north side: Saint-Cyr River South, Bailly Lake (Saint-Cyr River South), Barry Lake (Saint-Cyr River South), Robertine Lake;
- east side: Chartrand River, Aigle River (Doda Lake), Pascagama River, Encounter Brook;
- south side: Saint-Cyr River South, Dumont Lake, Canusio Lake, Mégiscane River;
- west side: Cherrier Lake, Mesplet Lake, Closse River, Mégiscane Lake.

== Toponymy ==
The former name of this body of water was "Maskotirikan Lake". The term "Saint-Cyr" is a family name of French origin.

Its meaning is associated with that of the Saint-Cyr River (Opawica River) whose upper part was named distinctly Saint-Cyr River South on September 24, 2003 by the Commission de toponymie du Quebec. This commission took into account that the course of the Saint-Cyr river belonged from now on to two hydrographic slopes as a result of the construction of an impoundment dam.

The toponym "lac Saint-Cyr" was made official on December 5, 1968 by the Commission de toponymie du Québec, when it was created.

== See also ==
- James Bay
- Nottaway River, a watercourse
- Matagami Lake, a body of water
- Bell River, a watercourse
- Parent Lake (Abitibi), a body of water
- Mégiscane River, a watercourse
- Saint-Cyr River South, a watercourse
- Chartrand River, a watercourse
- Canusio Lake, a watercourse
- Senneterre, a city
- List of lakes of Canada
