= Cherrier Lake =

- Watershed of Nottaway River

- Location within Quebec
- Location: Senneterre
- Coordinates: 48°42′58″N 75°47′03″W
- Type: Dammed lake
- Primary inflows: "Mesplet Pass" which is the outlet of Mesplet Lake
- Primary outflows: Saint-Cyr River South.
- Basin countries: Canada
- Max. length: 10.3 kilometres (6.4 mi)
- Max. width: 2.4 kilometres (1.5 mi)
- Surface elevation: 393 metres (1,289 ft)

Cherrier Lake is a body of freshwater in the north-eastern part of Senneterre in the Vallée-de-l'Or Regional County Municipality (RCM), in the administrative region of Abitibi-Témiscamingue, in the province of Quebec, in Canada.

Cherrier Lake is located in the township of Mesplet and Cherrier. Forestry is the main economic activity of the sector. Recreational tourism activities come second.

The hydrographic slope of Cherrier Lake is accessible through a forest road (North-South direction) which passes on the east side of the Saint-Cyr River Valley; in addition, another forest road (East-West direction) serves the north of the Lac Saint-Cyr Biodiversity Reserve.

The surface of Cherrier Lake is usually frozen from early November to mid-May, however, safe ice circulation is generally from mid-November to mid-April.

== Geography ==
Cherrier Lake has a total length of 10.3 kilometres (6.4 mi) and a maximum width of 2.4 kilometres (1.5 mi) in its northern part. On the north side this lake has a large swamp area. The surface of this lake is an altitude: 393 metres (1,289 ft) like other surrounding water bodies. Cherrier Lake is fed on the North side by the "Mesplet Pass" and on the South side by a discharge draining two unidentified lakes.

This lake has an atypical form forming a large inverted U to which each branch of the U becomes a separate emissary on the east side of the lake. The first outfall of Cherrier Lake is attached to the Saint-Cyr River South and the other to 7.5 kilometres (4.7 mi) downstream on the same river. These two emissaries form an island with a length of 8.9 kilometres (5.5 mi) by 3.6 kilometres (2.2 mi) in width. This island extends in parallel, from the east side to the river Saint-Cyr River South (coming from the North).

The mouth of the south emissary of lake Cherrier is located on the east shore of the lake, namely:

- 5.1 kilometres (3.2 mi) north of the confluence of the Saint-Cyr River South with the Mégiscane River;
- 16.7 kilometres (10.4 mi) north-east of the mouth of the Mégiscane Lake which is crossed by the Mégiscane River;
- 103.4 kilometres (64.2 mi) north-east of the mouth of the Mégiscane River (confluence with Parent Lake (Abitibi);
- 372 kilometres (231 mi) south-east of the mouth of the Nottaway River (confluence with Rupert Bay);
- 61.0 kilometres (37.9 mi) south-west of the village center of Obedjiwan;
- 101.7 kilometres (63.2 mi) east of the village center of Lebel-sur-Quevillon

The main hydrographic slopes near Cherrier Lake are:

- north side: Mesplet Lake, Saint-Cyr Lake (Saint-Cyr River South), Saint-Cyr River South, Cherrier Lake, Barry Lake (Saint-Cyr River South);
- east side: Saint-Cyr Lake (Saint-Cyr River South), Saint-Cyr River South, Berthelot River, Plamondon Creek (Gouin Reservoir), Pascagama River, Gouin Reservoir;
- south side: Saint-Cyr River South, Canusio Lake, Mégiscane Lake, Mégiscane River, Kekek River;
- west side: Closse River, Macho River, Wetetnagami River, Mégiscane River.

== Toponymy ==
The hydronym "Lac Cherrier" is linked to that of the canton of Cherrier.

This hydronym evokes the life work of Como-Séraphin Cherrier (Repentigny, 1798 - Montreal, 1885) who is recognized as a person of exceptional nature, according to the Canadian Prime Minister, Sir Wilfrid Laurier. Having practiced as a lawyer from 1822 to 1860, he pleaded famous causes, notably that where he represented the lords in their claims for compensation, on the occasion of the abolition of the seigneurial regime in 1854. President of the Bar of Montreal (1855- 1856), he was also a professor and dean of the Faculty of Law of Laval University in Montreal (1878-1885), deputy of the County of Montreal (1834-1838), member and tenor of the Patriot Party imprisoned for three months at the events of 1837-1838, opposed to the Union and Confederation. President of the Saint-Jean-Baptiste Society of Montreal in 1852-1853 and philanthropist, he was decorated with the Order of St. Gregory the Great.

The toponym "Lac Cherrier" was made official on December 5, 1968 by the Commission de toponymie du Québec, when it was created.

== See also ==
- James Bay
- Nottaway River, a watercourse
- Matagami Lake, a body of water
- Bell River, a watercourse
- Parent Lake (Abitibi), a body of water
- Mégiscane River, a watercourse
- Saint-Cyr River South, a watercourse
- Mesplet Lake, a watercourse
- Senneterre, a city
- List of lakes in Canada
