= Saint-Cyr River South =

Saint-Cyr South
- Watershed of Nottaway River

Location
- Country: Canada
- Province: Quebec
- Region: Nord-du-Québec

Physical characteristics
- Source: Barry Lake (Saint-Cyr River South)
  - location: Eeyou Istchee James Bay (municipality), Nord-du-Québec, Quebec
  - coordinates: 48°58′10″N 75°32′34″W
  - elevation: 392 m (1,286 ft)
- Mouth: Mégiscane River
  - location: Eeyou Istchee James Bay (municipality), Nord-du-Québec, Quebec
  - coordinates: 48°35′29″N 76°46′16″W
  - elevation: 293 m (961 ft)
- Length: 50.1 km (31.1 mi)

Basin features
- Tributaries
  - right: Chartrand River

The Saint-Cyr River South is a tributary of the Mégiscane River (via the Canusio Lake, flowing into Senneterre, in the administrative region of Abitibi-Témiscamingue, in Quebec, in Canada.

The river Saint-Cyr Sud flows successively into the cantons of Bailly, Kalm, Mesplet and Cherrier. Forestry is the main economic activity of the sector; recreational tourism activities, second.

The valley of the Saint-Cyr South River is served by the forest road R1053 (east–west direction) which passes on the north-west side and north of Lac Saint-Cyr. This road joins the road R1009 (north–south direction) which passes to the east of the Aigle River (Doda Lake).

The surface of the Saint-Cyr South River is usually frozen from early November to mid-May, however, safe ice circulation is generally from mid-November to mid-April.

== Geography ==
The hydrographic slopes adjacent to the Saint-Cyr South River are:
- north side: Barry Lake (Saint-Cyr River South), Saint-Cyr River (Opawica River), Father Lake (Doda Lake);
- east side: Aigle River (Doda Lake), Pascagama River;
- south side: Canusio Lake, Kekek River, Mégiscane River;
- west side: Closse river, Mégiscane Lake, Maricourt Lake.

The Saint-Cyr River South originates at the mouth of Barry Lake (Saint-Cyr River South) (length: 12.9 kilometres (8.0 mi); elevation: 392 metres (1,286 ft)) which straddles the townships of Barry and de Bailly, in Senneterre; in addition, a bay advances towards the North over a hundred meters in the township of urban, as well as the bay leading to the mouth of the lake.

The mouth of Barry Lake (Saint-Cyr River South) is located on the Southeast side at:

- 45.4 kilometres (28.2 mi) north of the mouth of the Saint-Cyr South River (confluence with the Mégiscane River;
- 44.7 kilometres (27.8 mi) northwest of a bay on the west shore of Gouin Reservoir;
- 129.4 kilometres (80.4 mi) north-east of the mouth of the Mégiscane River (confluence with Parent Lake (Abitibi);
- 353 kilometres (219 mi) south-east of the mouth of the Nottaway River (confluence with Rupert Bay);
- 56.0 kilometres (34.8 mi) north-east of the village center of Obedjiwan;
- 106 kilometres (66 mi) east of the village center of Lebel-sur-Quévillon.

From the mouth of Barry Lake (Saint-Cyr River South), the Saint-Cyr River South flows over 50.1 kilometres (31.1 mi) (versus 57.7 kilometres (35.9 mi) from the former outfall north of Barry Lake (Saint-Cyr River South) prior to the creation of this reservoir) in the following segments:

- 7.1 kilometres (4.4 mi) southerly in the canton of Bailly, crossing a strait of 0.8 kilometres (0.50 mi), then crossing the Bailly Lake (Saint-Cyr River South) (length: 6.7 kilometres (4.2 mi); altitude: 392 metres (1,286 ft)) on its full length, to its mouth;
- 5.3 kilometres (3.3 mi) southwesterly to the limit of Kalm township;
- 20.6 kilometres (12.8 mi) southwesterly in the township of Kalm and Mesplet, crossing the Saint-Cyr Lake (length: 15.2 kilometres (9.4 mi); altitude: 393 metres (1,289 ft)) of which 1.7 kilometres (1.1 mi) in the Kalm Township, 14.9 kilometres (9.3 mi) in the Township of Belmont and 4.0 kilometres (2.5 mi) in the Township of Cherrier to its mouth on the West Bank;
- 10.2 kilometres (6.3 mi) to the north, one hook 180 degrees west, then south across an area where the river widens, to a bend in the river;
- 6.9 kilometres (4.3 mi) southwesterly, crossing an unidentified lake at the beginning of the segment.

The Saint-Cyr South River empties into a bay stretching on 1.1 kilometres (0.68 mi) on the north shore of Canusio Lake which is crossed to the North by the Mégiscane River. From there, the current of this river generally descends towards the South-West crossing notably the Mégiscane Lake, the Berthelot Lake (Mégiscane River), the Girouard Lake, the Faillon Lake, then north-west to the mouth of the Mégiscane River (confluence with the Bell River).

The course flows northward across Parent Lake (Abitibi), before spilling into Matagami Lake; the latter in turn flows into the Nottaway River, a tributary of Rupert Bay (James Bay).

The confluence of the Saint-Cyr South River with the Canusio Lake is located at:

- 29.9 kilometres (18.6 mi) northwest of Gouin Reservoir;
- 29.8 kilometres (18.5 mi) north-east of the mouth of Lake Berthelot (Mégiscane River);
- 101.7 kilometres (63.2 mi) north-east of the mouth of the Mégiscane River;
- 94.7 kilometres (58.8 mi) east of the mouth of Parent Lake (Abitibi);
- 62.6 kilometres (38.9 mi) south-west of the village center of Obedjiwan (located on the north shore of Gouin Reservoir).
- 375 kilometres (233 mi) south-east of the mouth of the Nottaway River.

== Toponymy ==
At various times in history, this territory has been occupied by the Attikameks, the Algonquins and the Crees. The term "Saint-Cyr" is a family name of French origin.

The "Toponymic Directory of 1969" describes this river as follows: "About 125 km long, the Saint-Cyr River has its source about fifty kilometers west of the Gouin Reservoir, contiguous to the Mégiscane Lake. It sneaks northward forming the lakes Bailly, Barry and Saint-Cyr then flows into the Opawica River through Doda Lake. "

From the boundary of the administrative regions of Abitibi-Témiscamingue and Nord-du-Québec, the upper part of the river, Barry Lake (Saint-Cyr River South) at Canusio Lake (elevation of 392 metres (1,286 ft)), instead flows to the hydrographic slope of Gouin Reservoir, via the Mégiscane River which was harnessed by Hydro-Québec. This characteristic of belonging to two hydrographic slopes has prompted the Department of the Environment's "Department of Knowledge and Expertise in the Water Sector" to ask the Commission de toponymie du Québec to revise the name of the southern part of the Saint-Cyr River; Thus, this commission adopted the hydronym "Rivière Saint-Cyr Sud" to designate this southern segment from Barry Lake (Saint-Cyr River South), at its meeting on September 24, 2003. In return, the hydronym "Rivière Saint-Cyr" remains the name of the segment of 48.9 kilometres (30.4 mi) of the northern part (slope of the Nottaway River) in Nord-du-Québec. The old course of the Saint-Cyr River was worth 106.6 kilometres (66.2 mi).

In surveying this region between 1897 and 1899, surveyor Henry O'Sullivan designated this river "Saint-Cyr River" in tribute to Arthur Saint-Cyr (1860–1923), his assistant from 1879 to 1886, or until the double title of provincial and federal surveyor. Shortly thereafter, Arthur Saint-Cyr became responsible for the location and construction of the Quebec Central Railway to connect the cities of Lévis and Sherbrooke. Subsequently, Saint-Cyr leaves Quebec for Western Canada, where he will cease his professional activities in 1914.

The toponym "Saint-Cyr River" was made official on December 5, 1968, at the Commission de toponymie du Québec, when it was created; and toponym "Rivière Saint-Cyr Sud", September 24, 2003.

== See also ==
- James Bay
- Rupert Bay
- Nottaway River, a watercourse
- Matagami Lake, a body of water
- Bell River, a watercourse
- Mégiscane River, a watercourse
- Bailly Lake (Saint-Cyr River South), a body of water
- Barry Lake (Saint-Cyr River South), a body of water
- Saint-Cyr Lake (Saint-Cyr River South), a body of water
- Canusio Lake, a body of water
- Senneterre
- List of rivers of Quebec
