= Saint-Cyr =

Saint-Cyr refers to the popular child-saint Cyricus, whose following was strong in France because relics were brought back from Antioch by the 4th-century Bishop Saint Amator of Auxerre.

Saint-Cyr may refer to:

== Places ==
=== France ===
- École spéciale militaire de Saint-Cyr, a French military academy; Saint-Cyr is a common name for the academy
- École de Saint-Cyr, a boarding school for girls founded in 1684 by Madame de Maintenon
- Saint-Cyr, Ardèche, in the department of Ardèche
- Saint-Cyr, Haute-Vienne, in the department of Haute-Vienne
- Saint-Cyr, Saône-et-Loire, in the department of Saône-et-Loire
- Saint-Cyr, Vienne, in the department of Vienne
- Saint-Cyr-au-Mont-d'Or, in the department of Rhône
- Saint-Cyr-Bocage, in the department of Manche
- Saint-Cyr-de-Favières, in the department of Loire
- Saint-Cyr-de-Salerne, in the department of Eure
- Saint-Cyr-des-Gâts, in the department of Vendée
- Saint-Cyr-de-Valorges, in the department of Loire
- Saint-Cyr-du-Bailleul, in the department of Manche
- Saint-Cyr-du-Doret, in the department of Charente-Maritime
- Saint-Cyr-du-Gault, in the department of Loir-et-Cher
- Saint-Cyr-du-Ronceray, in the department of Calvados
- Saint-Cyr-en-Arthies, in the department of Val-d'Oise
- Saint-Cyr-en-Bourg, in the department of Maine-et-Loire
- Saint-Cyr-en-Pail, in the department of Mayenne
- Saint-Cyr-en-Talmondais, in the department of Vendée
- Saint-Cyr-en-Val, in the department of Loiret
- Saint-Cyr-la-Campagne, in the department of Eure
- Saint-Cyr-la-Lande, in the department of Deux-Sèvres
- Saint-Cyr-la-Rivière, in the department of Essonne
- Saint-Cyr-la-Roche, in the department of Corrèze
- Saint-Cyr-la-Rosière, in the department of Orne
- Saint-Cyr-le-Chatoux, in the department of Rhône
- Saint-Cyr-l'École, in the department of Yvelines, the city where the military academy was initially located
- Saint-Cyr-le-Gravelais, in the department of Mayenne
- Saint-Cyr-les-Champagnes, in the department of Dordogne
- Saint-Cyr-les-Colons, in the department of Yonne
- Saint-Cyr-les-Vignes, in the department of Loire
- Saint-Cyr-Montmalin, in the department of Jura
- Saint-Cyr-sous-Dourdan, in the department of Essonne
- Saint-Cyr-sur-le-Rhône, in the department of Rhône
- Saint-Cyr-sur-Loire, in the department of Indre-et-Loire
- Saint-Cyr-sur-Menthon, in the department of Ain
- Saint-Cyr-sur-Mer, in the department of Var
- Saint-Cyr-sur-Morin, in the department of Seine-et-Marne

=== Canada ===
- Saint-Cyr River (Ottawa River), a tributary of the Ottawa River in Quebec
- Saint-Cyr River (Opawica River), a tributary of Doda Lake in Quebec
- Saint-Cyr River South, a tributary of the Mégiscane River in Quebec
- Saint-Cyr Lake (Saint-Cyr River South), Quebec

=== United Kingdom ===
- Newton St Cyres, Devon

== People ==
- Saint-Cyr (surname)

== Other uses ==
- Immigration and Naturalization Service v. St. Cyr (2001), a U.S. Supreme Court case involving habeas corpus relief for deportable aliens
- Saint-Cyr (film), or The King's Daughters, a 2000 French film
