= Bastien River =

Bastien
- Watershed of Nottaway River

Location
- Country: Canada
- Province: Quebec
- Region: Abitibi-Témiscamingue

Physical characteristics
- Source: Unidentified Lake
  - location: Senneterre, La Vallée-de-l'Or Regional County Municipality (RCM), Abitibi-Témiscamingue, Quebec
  - coordinates: 48°23′21″N 76°43′22″W
  - elevation: 452 m (1,483 ft)
- Mouth: Mégiscane River, Faillon Lake
  - location: Senneterre, La Vallée-de-l'Or Regional County Municipality, Abitibi-Témiscamingue, Quebec
  - coordinates: 48°21′41″N 76°38′18″W
  - elevation: 355 m (1,165 ft)
- Length: 17.2 km (10.7 mi)

Basin features
- Tributaries
  - left: (upstream); outlet of lake Ubald; outlet of lakes Henri and Abel.

The Bastien River is a tributary of the north shore of Faillon Lake which is crossed by the Mégiscane River. The Bastien River flows into the town of Senneterre in La Vallée-de-l'Or Regional County Municipality (RCM), in the administrative region of Abitibi-Témiscamingue, in Quebec, Canada.

The course of the river successively crosses the townships of Martin, Valets and Faillon.

The Bastien River flows entirely in forest territory, generally towards the South. Forestry is the main economic activity of this hydrographic slope; recreational tourism activities, second. Road R0806 (Penetration Road) cuts from east to west the lower part of the hydrographic slope of the Bastien River; secondary and forest roads also serve the entire hydrographic slope. The surface of the river is usually frozen from mid-December to mid-April.

== Geography ==
The Bastien River rises at the mouth of an unidentified lake (length: 0.4 kilometres (0.25 mi) altitude: 452 metres (1,483 ft)) on the southern flank of a mountain. An assembly summit (northwest of the lake) reaches 513 metres (1,683 ft).

The mouth of this head lake is located at 4.5 kilometres (2.8 mi) north-west of the R0808 forest road, which runs north-east along the north shore of the Mégiscane River; at 7.0 kilometres (4.3 mi) north of the confluence of the Bastien River with the Mégiscane River; to 38.5 kilometres (23.9 mi) north-east of downtown Senneterre; and at 44.0 kilometres (27.3 mi) south-east of the mouth of Parent Lake (Abitibi).

The main hydrographic slopes near the Bastien River are:

- North side: Lac Valets, Delestres River, Lalochetière Lake;
- East side: Wilbrod Lake, Faillon Lake, Mégiscane River;
- South side: Faillon Lake, Mégiscane River;
- West side: Collin River (Mégiscane River tributary), Martin Lake.

From its source, the Bastien River flows on 17.2 kilometres (10.7 mi) according to the following segments:

- 4.9 kilometres (3.0 mi) towards the North-East between the mountains, to the bottom of a bay on the southwestern shore of Bastien Lake;
- 1.7 kilometres (1.1 mi) north-east across Bastien Lake (length: 1.9 kilometres (1.2 mi); altitude: 455 metres (1,493 ft)), up to mouth;
- 1.9 kilometres (1.2 mi) north-east across an unidentified lake (length: 1.2 kilometres (0.75 mi); altitude: 415 metres (1,362 ft)), up to its mouth.

This segment of river passes on the South side of a mountain whose highest peak reaches 530 metres (1,740 ft);

- 0.8 kilometres (0.50 mi) northeasterly to the outlet (from the northwest) of Henri and Abel lakes;
- 3.4 kilometres (2.1 mi) north-east, then south-east skirting a mountain whose summit reaches 411 metres (1,348 ft), to the dump (coming from the North-East) Ubald and Ducheneau lakes;
- 4.5 kilometres (2.8 mi) south to confluence

The Bastien River is discharged on the north shore of Faillon Lake which is crossed to the southwest by the Mégiscane River (elevation: 355 metres (1,165 ft)). From this confluence, it flows southwest and then northwest to Parent Lake (Abitibi), which empties into the Bell River, a tributary of the Matagami Lake. The latter lake in turn flows into the Nottaway River, a tributary of the southeastern shore of James Bay.

This confluence of the Bastien River with the Mégiscane River flows to:

- 9.8 kilometres (6.1 mi) north-east of the mouth of Faillon Lake;
- 39.3 kilometres (24.4 mi) east of the confluence of the Mégiscane River with Parent Lake (Abitibi);
- 50.1 kilometres (31.1 mi) south-east of the mouth of Parent Lake (Abitibi);
- 13.1 kilometres (8.1 mi) north of the Canadian National Railway; the busiest rail stops being "Press" and "Paradise";
- 44.9 kilometres (27.9 mi) east of the village center of Senneterre.

== Toponymy ==
The name "Bastien River" was officialized on December 5, 1968, at the Commission de toponymie du Québec.

== See also ==
- Nottaway River, a watercourse
- Matagami Lake, a body of water
- Bell River, a watercourse
- Parent Lake (Abitibi), a body of water
- Mégiscane River, a watercourse
- Senneterre, a city
- La Vallée-de-l'Or Regional County Municipality (RCM)
- List of rivers of Quebec
