= Achepabanca Lake =

Lake in Quebec, Canada

- Watershed of Nottaway River

- Location within Quebec
- Location: Senneterre
- Coordinates: 48°39′29″N 76°13′38″W
- Primary inflows: Achepabanca River
- Primary outflows: Achepabanca River
- Basin countries: Canada
- Max. length: 7.6 kilometres (4.7 mi)
- Max. width: 1.5 kilometres (0.93 mi)
- Surface elevation: 381 metres (1,250 ft)

Achepabanca Lake is a freshwater body crossed by the Achepabanca River, in the north-eastern part of Senneterre, within La Vallée-de-l'Or Regional County Municipality (RCM), in the administrative region of Abitibi-Témiscamingue, in the province of Quebec, in Canada.

Lake Achepabanca is located entirely in the township of Maricourt. Forestry is the main economic activity of the sector. Recreational tourism activities come second. Achepabanca Lake is the eastern boundary of the Wetetnagami Lake Biodiversity Reserve.

The hydrographic slope of Achepabanca Lake is accessible via a forest road (east-west) that passes on the north side of Achepabanca Lake, passing through the Lake Wetetnagami Biodiversity Reserve; in addition, another forest road (East-West direction) serves the southern part of this Reserve and the western side of Lake Achepabanca.

The surface of Achepabanca Lake is usually frozen from early November to mid-May, however, safe ice circulation is generally from mid-November to mid-April.

== Geography ==
Lake Achepabanca is crossed to the south by the Achepabanca River. This lake has a total length of 7.6 kilometres (4.7 mi) and a maximum width of 1.5 kilometres (0.93 mi). The surface of this lake is an altitude: 381 metres (1,250 ft) like several other bodies of water surrounding. Its long form is an enlargement of the Achepabanca River flowing southward to Girouard Lake (Mégiscane River); the northern part of the latter being crossed to the southwest by the Mégiscane River.

The mouth of lake Achepabanca is located on the south side of the lake. This mouth of lake Achepabanca is at:

- 8.6 kilometres (5.3 mi) north of the mouth of the Achepabanca River;
- 67.5 kilometres (41.9 mi) north-east of the mouth of the Mégiscane River (confluence with Parent Lake (Abitibi);
- 352 kilometres (219 mi) south-east of the mouth of the Nottaway River (confluence with Rupert Bay);
- 77.7 kilometres (48.3 mi) north-east of downtown Senneterre;
- 72.6 kilometres (45.1 mi) south-east of the village center of Lebel-sur-Quevillon.

The main hydrographic slopes near Lake Achepabanca are:

- north side: Achepabanca River, Wetetnagami River;
- east side: Maricourt Lake (Macho River), Closse River, Mégiscane River, Mégiscane Lake;
- south side: Berthelot Lake (Mégiscane River), Mégiscane River, Whitegoose River, Berthelot River;
- west side: Charrette Lake, Wetetnagami River, Delestres River.

== Toponymy ==
The Achepabanca Lake Acme is linked to the Achepabanca River and the Achepabanca Northeast River.

The toponym "lac Achepabanca" was formalized on December 5, 1968, by the Commission de toponymie du Québec, when it was created.

== See also ==
- James Bay
- Nottaway River, a watercourse
- Matagami Lake, a body of water
- Bell River, a watercourse
- Parent Lake (Abitibi), a body of water
- Mégiscane River, a watercourse
- Achepabanca River, a watercourse
- Girouard Lake (Mégiscane River), a watercourse
- Wetetnagami Lake Biodiversity Reserve
- Senneterre, a city
- List of lakes in Canada
