= Saint-Cyr River =

Saint-Cyr
- Watershed of Nottaway River

Location
- Country: Canada
- Province: Quebec
- Region: Nord-du-Québec

Physical characteristics
- Source: Barry Lake (Saint-Cyr River South)
  - location: Eeyou Istchee James Bay (municipality), Nord-du-Québec, Quebec
  - coordinates: 49°00′31″N 75°34′23″W
  - elevation: 395 m (1,296 ft)
- Mouth: Mégiscane River
  - location: Eeyou Istchee James Bay (municipality), Nord-du-Québec, Quebec
  - coordinates: 49°19′12″N 75°18′42″W
  - elevation: 338 m (1,109 ft)
- Length: 48.9 km (30.4 mi)

Basin features
- Tributaries
  - right: Doda Lake

The Saint-Cyr River /ˌseɪntˈsɪər/ is a tributary of Doda Lake, flowing into the municipality of Eeyou Istchee Baie-James (municipality), in Jamésie, in the area of Nord-du-Québec, Quebec, Canada.

The Saint-Cyr river flows successively into the townships of Urban, Lacroix, Belmont and Royal. Forestry is the main economic activity of the sector; recreational tourism activities, second.

The Saint-Cyr River valley is served by the forest road R1053 (east-west direction) which passes on the north-west side and north of Lac Saint-Cyr. This road joins the road R1009 (North-South direction) which passes to the East of the Aigle River (Doda Lake).

The surface of the Saint-Cyr River is usually frozen from early November to mid-May, however, safe ice circulation is generally from mid-November to mid-April.

== Geography ==
The hydrographic slopes adjacent to the Saint-Cyr River are:
- north side: Father Lake (Doda Lake), Doda Lake, Opawica River;
- east side: Aigle River (Doda Lake), Yvonne River, Évrey Creek, Roy River;
- south side: Mégiscane Lake, Cherrier Lake, Pascagama River;
- west side: Macho River, Maseres Lake, Wetetnagami Lake.

The Saint-Cyr River originates at the mouth of Barry Lake (Saint-Cyr River South) (length: 12.9 kilometres (8.0 mi); elevation: 392 metres (1,286 ft)) which straddles the townships of Barry, de Bailly, in Senneterre; in addition, a bay advances towards the North over a hundred meters in the township of urban, as well as the bay leading to the mouth of the lake.

The mouth of Barry Lake (Saint-Cyr River South) is located at:

- 39.5 kilometres (24.5 mi) South of the mouth of the Saint-Cyr River (confluence with the Surprise Lake (Roy River);
- 53.8 kilometres (33.4 mi) south-east of the mouth of Doda Lake;
- 80.6 kilometres (50.1 mi) southeast of the confluence of the Opawica River and Chibougamau River, the head of the Waswanipi River;
- 348 kilometres (216 mi) southeasterly of the mouth of the Nottaway River (confluence with James Bay);
- 82.1 kilometres (51.0 mi) south-east of the village center of Waswanipi;
- 60.4 kilometres (37.5 mi) northwest of the village center of Obedjiwan.

From the mouth of Barry Lake (Saint-Cyr River South), the Saint-Cyr River flows over 48.9 kilometres (30.4 mi) according to the following segments:

- 5.9 kilometres (3.7 mi) northeasterly to the western limit of Lacroix township;
- 4.7 kilometres (2.9 mi) northeasterly, in the township of Lacroix, to the limit of the canton of Belmont;
- 13.4 kilometres (8.3 mi) northeasterly in Belmont Township from the west side of “Petit Lac Hébert” to the outlet (from the west) of Roméo Lake;
- 8.5 kilometres (5.3 mi) northeasterly on the west side of Hébert Lake (Hébert River) to the southern limit of the township of Royal;
- 6.6 kilometres (4.1 mi) northeasterly in the Township of Royal from the west side of Hébert Lake (Hébert River) to the unidentified lake from the east);
- 9.8 kilometres (6.1 mi) to the northeast, forming a westward hook on 0.5 kilometres (0.31 mi) at the end of the segment, to its mouth.

The Saint-Cyr River flows on the south shore of a bay stretching over 1.2 kilometres (0.75 mi) south of Doda Lake. The northern part of this lake is crossed to the West by the Opawica River. From there, the current of this river generally descends to the West, crossing in particular Doda Lake, Françoise Lake (Opawica River), La Ronde Lake, Lessard Lake, Lichen Lake (Opawica River), then north across Wachigabau Lake and Opawica Lake to its confluence with the Chibougamau River; this confluence is the source of the Waswanipi River.

The course flows westward through the northern portion of Lake Waswanipi, Goéland Lake and Olga Lake, before pouring into the Matagami Lake; the latter in turn flows into the Nottaway River, a tributary of Rupert Bay (James Bay).

The confluence of the Saint-Cyr River with the Opawica River is located at:

- 15.1 kilometres (9.4 mi) South of the mouth of Doda Lake;
- 63.5 kilometres (39.5 mi) southeast of the mouth of the Opawica River (confluence with the Chibougamau River), the head of the Waswanipi River;
- 95.1 kilometres (59.1 mi) south-west of downtown Chibougamau;
- 62.1 kilometres (38.6 mi) south-west of the village center of Chapais;
- 77.6 kilometres (48.2 mi) northwest of the village center of Obedjiwan (located on the north shore of Gouin Reservoir).
- 338.4 kilometres (210.3 mi) south-east of the mouth of the Nottaway River.

== Toponymy ==
At various times in history, this territory has been occupied by the Attikameks, the Algonquins and the Crees. The term "Saint-Cyr" is a family name of French origin.

The "Toponymic Directory of 1969" describes this river as follows: "About 125 km long, the Saint-Cyr River has its source about fifty kilometers west of the Gouin Reservoir, contiguous to the Mégiscane Lake. It sneaks northward forming the lakes Bailly, Barry and Saint-Cyr then flows into the Opawica River through Doda Lake."

From the boundary of the administrative regions of Abitibi-Témiscamingue and Nord-du-Québec, the upper part of the river, Barry Lake (Saint-Cyr River South) to Canusio Lake (elevation of 392 metres (1,286 ft)), rather to the hydrographic slope of the Nottaway River, via the Mégiscane River which was harnessed by Hydro-Quebec to the emissary of “Lac du Poète”. This characteristic of belonging to two hydrographic slopes has prompted the Department of the Environment's "Service de la connaissance et de l'expertise du milieu hydrique du ministère de l'Environnement” (Department of Knowledge and Expertise in the Water Sector) to ask the Commission de toponymie du Québec to revise the name of the southern part of the Saint-Cyr River; thus, this commission adopted the hydronym "Rivière Saint-Cyr Sud" to designate this southern segment from Barry Lake (Saint-Cyr River South), at its meeting of September 24, 2003. In return, the hydronym "Rivière Saint-Cyr" remains the name of the segment of 48.9 kilometres (30.4 mi) of the northern part (slope of the Opawica River) in Nord-du-Québec. The old course of the Saint-Cyr River was worth 106.6 kilometres (66.2 mi).

In surveying this region between 1897 and 1899, surveyor Henry O'Sullivan designated this river "Saint-Cyr River" in tribute to Arthur Saint-Cyr (1860-1923), his assistant from 1879 to 1886, or until the double title of provincial and federal surveyor. Shortly thereafter, Arthur Saint-Cyr became responsible for the location and construction of the Quebec Central Railway to connect the cities of Lévis and Sherbrooke. Subsequently, Saint-Cyr leaves Quebec for Western Canada, where he will cease his professional activities in 1914.

The toponym "Saint-Cyr River" was made official on December 5, 1968, at the Commission de toponymie du Québec, when it was created.

== See also ==
- James Bay
- Rupert Bay
- Nottaway River, a watercourse
- Matagami Lake, a body of water
- Waswanipi River, a watercourse
- Opawica River, a watercourse
- Doda Lake, a body of water
- Barry Lake (Saint-Cyr River South), a body of water
- Eeyou Istchee James Bay (Municipality)
- List of rivers of Quebec
