= Achepabanca =

Achepabanca may refer to:

== Places ==
- Achepabanca River, Quebec, Canada
- Achepabanca River North-East, a tributary of the Achepabanca River in Quebec, Canada
- Achepabanca Lake, in Quebec, Canada
