= Girouard Lake =

Lake in Senneterre, Quebec, Canada

- Watershed of Nottaway River

- Location within Quebec
- Location: Senneterre
- Coordinates: 48°29′21″N 76°19′25″W
- Type: Natural
- Primary inflows: Mégiscane River, outlet of lake Gérard.
- Primary outflows: Mégiscane River
- Basin countries: Canada
- Max. length: 14.1 kilometres (8.8 mi)
- Max. width: 1.1 kilometres (0.68 mi)
- Surface elevation: 373 metres (1,224 ft)

Girouard Lake is a freshwater body of water crossed by the Mégiscane River, in the north-eastern part of Senneterre, in La Vallée-de-l'Or Regional County Municipality (RCM), in the administrative region of Abitibi-Témiscamingue, in the province of Quebec, in Canada.

Girouard Lake is located entirely in the township of Girouard. Forestry is the main economic activity of the sector. Recreational tourism activities come second.

The hydrographic slope of Lake Girouard is accessible via the Faillon Lake Road (East-West direction) that passes on the south side of Lake Girouard; in addition, another forest road (East-West direction) serves an area northwest of the Mégiscane River which includes the southern part of the Lake Wetetnagami Biodiversity Reserve.

The surface of Girouard Lake is usually frozen from early November to mid-May, however safe ice circulation is generally from mid-November to mid-April.

== Geography ==
The northern part of Girouard Lake is crossed on the Southwest by the Mégiscane River. A long bay of 10.1 kilometres (6.3 mi) extends south in the township of Girouard. This lake has a total length of 14.1 kilometres (8.8 mi) and a maximum width of 1.1 kilometres (0.68 mi). The surface of this lake is an altitude: 373 metres (1,224 ft).

The mouth of Lake Girouard is located on the south side of the lake. This mouth of Lake Girouard is at:

- 61.5 kilometres (38.2 mi) north-east of the mouth of the Mégiscane River (confluence with Parent Lake (Abitibi);
- 58.7 kilometres (36.5 mi) east of the mouth of Parent Lake (Abitibi);
- 360 kilometres (220 mi) south-east of the mouth of the Nottaway River (confluence with Rupert Bay);
- 70.5 kilometres (43.8 mi) north-east of downtown Senneterre;
- 78.0 kilometres (48.5 mi) south-east of the village center of Lebel-sur-Quévillon.

The main hydrographic slopes near Girouard Lake are:

- north side: Mégiscane River, Achepabanca River, Achepabanca Lake, Capousacataca River;
- east side: Mégiscane River, Berthelot River, Valmy Lake, Berthelot Lake (Mégiscane River), Whitegoose River;
- south side: Canyon Creek, Valmy Lake, Attic River;
- west side: Mégiscane River, Valets Lake, Delestres River.

== Toponymy ==
The hydronym "Lac Girouard" is linked to that of the township of Girouard. The term "Girouard" is a family name of French origin.

The toponym "lac Girouard" was formalized on December 5, 1968, by the Commission de toponymie du Québec, when it was created.

== See also ==
- Bell River, a watercourse
- James Bay
- List of lakes of Canada
- Matagami Lake, a body of water
- Mégiscane River, a watercourse
- Nottaway River, a watercourse
- Parent Lake (Abitibi), a body of water
- Senneterre, a city
