= Achepabanca River =

Achepabanca
- Watershed of Nottaway River

Location
- Country: Canada
- Province: Quebec
- Region: Nord-du-Québec

Physical characteristics
- Source: Machepabanca Lake
  - location: Senneterre, La Vallée-de-l'Or Regional County Municipality (RCM), Abitibi-Témiscamingue, Quebec
  - coordinates: 48°40′06″N 76°09′33″W
  - elevation: 419 m (1,375 ft)
- Mouth: Mégiscane River, Girouard Lake
  - location: Senneterre, La Vallée-de-l'Or Regional County Municipality, Abitibi-Témiscamingue, Quebec
  - coordinates: 48°33′04″N 76°15′47″W
  - elevation: 385 m (1,263 ft)
- Length: 21.1 km (13.1 mi)

Basin features
- Tributaries
  - left: Achepabanca River North-East
  - right: (upstream); outlet of lake Wickotese; outlet of lake Akôkodjic; outlet of lake Gilles; outlet of lakes Lucille, Benout, Clavet and Julien.

The Achepabanca River is a tributary of the Mégiscane River, flowing into the north-eastern part of Senneterre, in La Vallée-de-l'Or Regional County Municipality (RCM), in the administrative region of Abitibi-Témiscamingue, in Quebec, in Canada.

The course of the river successively crosses the townships of Maricourt, Charrette and Girouard (on the border of the canton Berthelot).

The Achepabanca River runs entirely on forest land north-east of the La Vérendrye Wildlife Reserve and on the west side of Gouin Reservoir. Forestry is the main economic activity of this hydrographic slope; recreational tourism activities, second. The surface of the river is usually frozen from the beginning of December to the end of April. The hydrographic slope of the Achepabanca River is served by some forest roads.

== Geography ==
The Achepabanca River originates near the northern limit of the administrative region of Abitibi-Témiscamingue, at the mouth of Lake Machepabanca. This lake is fed by many lakes, all of which are surrounded by mountains, with some twenty peaks varying between 420 metres (1,380 ft) and 510 metres (1,670 ft).

This source of the river is located at:

- 4.3 kilometres (2.7 mi) north of the R0808 road which runs between Achepabanca Lake and the Achepabanca River North-East;
- 14.1 kilometres (8.8 mi) north of the confluence of the Achepabanca River with the Mégiscane River;
- 74.1 kilometres (46.0 mi) north-east of the confluence of the Mégiscane River;
- 84.9 kilometres (52.8 mi) north-east of downtown Senneterre;
- 51.2 kilometres (31.8 mi) north of the Forsythe Railway Stop at the Canadian National Railway.

The main hydrographic slopes near the Achepabanca River are:

- North side: Panache River, Jacques Lake, Clavert Lake;
- East side: Achepabanca River North-East, Mégiscane River, Berthelot Lake (Mégiscane River), Machepabanca Lake;
- South side: Achepabanca River North-East, Mégiscane River, Berthelot Lake (Mégiscane River);
- West side: Capousacataca River, Lake Charrette, Valets Lake.

From the mouth of Machepabanca Lake, the Achepabanca River flows over 21.1 kilometres (13.1 mi) according to the following segments:

Upper course of Achepabanca River (segment of 11.8 kilometres (7.3 mi))

- 2.1 kilometres (1.3 mi) westerly, including crossing a lake (elevation: 391 metres (1,283 ft)), over 1.9 kilometres (1.2 mi) to its mouth;
- 1.1 kilometres (0.68 mi) northwesterly to the southeastern shore of the northeastern part of Achepabanca Lake;
- 7.6 kilometres (4.7 mi) of which 2.3 kilometres (1.4 mi) towards the South-West, then 5.3 kilometres (3.3 mi) to the South, crossing the Achepabanca (length: 7.9 kilometres (4.9 mi); altitude: 391 metres (1,283 ft)), to its mouth;
- 1.0 kilometre (0.62 mi) southeasterly, crossing three sets of rapids, to the north shore of a lake;

Lower course of Achepabanca River (segment of 9.3 kilometres (5.8 mi))

- 1.8 kilometres (1.1 mi) south, crossing an unidentified lake;
- 1.8 kilometres (1.1 mi) southerly, forming a curve westerly to the north shore of a lake formed by a widening of the river;
- 3.5 kilometres (2.2 mi) south-east across a lake (length: 4.1 kilometres (2.5 mi); altitude: 390 metres (1,280 ft)) formed by the widening of the river to its mouth;
- 1.8 kilometres (1.1 mi) south across a small unidentified lake (length: 0.4 kilometres (0.25 mi); altitude: 389 metres (1,276 ft)), up to confluence of the Achepabanca River North-East (coming from the northeast), the main tributary of the Achepabanca River;
- 0.4 kilometres (0.25 mi) south to the confluence of the river

The Achepabanca River discharges on the north bank of the Mégiscane River. The latter usually flows westward forming large zigzags. It is a tributary of the east shore of Parent Lake (Abitibi). It empties into the Bell River, a tributary of Matagami Lake which in turn flows into the Nottaway River, a tributary of the southeastern shore of James Bay.

This confluence of the Achepabanca River with the Mégiscane River is located downstream from Rapids Manidioc and Berthelot Lake which receives from the North the waters of the Macho River and from the South the waters of the Berthelot River; upstream of Girouard Lake. Specifically, the Achepabanca River flows to:

- 0.4 kilometres (0.25 mi) south of the confluence of the Achepabanca River North-East;
- 65.2 kilometres (40.5 mi) north-east of the confluence of the Mégiscane River with Parent Lake (Abitibi);
- 37.1 kilometres (23.1 mi) north of the Foresyth rail stop at the Canadian National Railway;
- 75.4 kilometres (46.9 mi) north-east of the village center of Senneterre;
- 77.5 kilometres (48.2 mi) south-east of the village center of Lebel-sur-Quévillon;
- 62.1 kilometres (38.6 mi) west of Gouin Reservoir.

== Toponymy ==
The toponym "Achepabanca River" was formalized on December 5, 1968, at the Commission de toponymie du Québec.

== See also ==
- Nottaway River, a watercourse
- Matagami Lake, a body of water
- Bell River, a watercourse
- Parent Lake (Abitibi), a body of water
- Mégiscane River, a watercourse
- Achepabanca River North-East, a watercourse
- Gouin Reservoir, a body of water
- Achepabanca Lake, a body of water
- Girouard Lake, a body of water
- Senneterre, a city
- La Vallée-de-l'Or Regional County Municipality (RCM)
- List of rivers of Quebec
