= Faillon =

Faillon may refer to:

- Étienne-Michel Faillon (1799–1870), a French historian, Sulpician priest and teacher
- Faillon Lake, on the Mégiscane River, in Quebec, Canada

== See also ==
- Fallon (disambiguation)
