= Valets Lake =

Lake in Quebec, Canada

- Watershed of Nottaway River

- Location within Quebec
- Location: Senneterre
- Coordinates: 48°32′35″N 76°29′17″W
- Type: Natural
- Primary inflows: B.-B.-C. creek; Kâkiyâckowok creek and two other outlets of a set of lakes.
- Primary outflows: Capousacataca River
- Basin countries: Canada
- Max. length: 18.5 kilometres (11.5 mi)
- Max. width: 4.6 kilometres (2.9 mi)
- Surface elevation: 389 metres (1,276 ft)

Valets Lake is a freshwater body that straddles Valets and Girouard Townships in Senneterre in La Vallée-de-l'Or Regional County Municipality (RCM), in the administrative region of Abitibi-Témiscamingue, in province of Quebec, in Canada.

Forestry is the main economic activity of the sector; recreational tourism activities come second. Its surface is generally frozen from the beginning of December to the end of April.

The hydrographic slope of lake Valets is mainly served by a forest road that goes north between the Capousacataca River and lake Valets.

== Geography ==
This 18.5 kilometres (11.5 mi) lake has two parts to the north and a long bay extending southward 9.4 kilometres (5.8 mi). This body of water is relatively parallel and on the west side of the Capousacataca River.

Lake Valets obtains supplies from the east side by the outlet of Lakes Adjutor and Robitaille; and on the west side by the Bird Lake outlet, BC Creek, draining a set of lakes including Kâwininonamebanekak and Kâpiskagamak, the Kâmakabosikak Lake outlet and Kâkiyâckowok stream draining a series of lakes including Tuillé, Wiashgamic and Joe.

The mouth of this lake is located at the bottom of a northeastern bay 7.4 kilometres (4.6 mi) north of the confluence of the Capousacataca River with the Mégiscane River; at 53.8 kilometres (33.4 mi) north-east of the confluence of the Mégiscane River with Parent Lake (Abitibi); to 40.7 kilometres (25.3 mi) north of the Canadian National Railway's Paradise Station and 64.7 kilometres (40.2 mi) northeast of Senneterre.

The main hydrographic slopes near Lac Valets are:

- North side: Capousacataca River, Wetetnagami River, Lecompte River;
- East side: Capousacataca River, Mégiscane River;
- South side: Jim Creek, Mégiscane River, Faillon Lake;
- West side: Collin River, Delestres River, Lecompte River.

Lake Valets flows to the bottom of a bay to the northeast in the Capousacataca River.

== Toponymy ==
The name "Lac Valets" was officialized on December 5, 1968 by the Commission de toponymie du Québec when it was created.

== See also ==
- Capousacataca River, a watercourse
- Mégiscane River, a watercourse
- Parent Lake (Abitibi), a body of water
- Bell River, a watercourse
- Matagami Lake, a body of water
- Nottaway River, a watercourse
- Senneterre, a city
- La Vallée-de-l'Or Regional County Municipality (MRC)
- List of lakes in Canada
