= Canusio Lake =

Lake in Quebec, Canada

- Watershed of Nottaway River

- Location within Quebec
- Location: Eeyou Istchee James Bay (mconvertcipality)
- Coordinates: 48°32′45″N 75°47′56″W
- Type: Natural
- Primary inflows: Mégiscane River, Saint-Cyr River South.
- Primary outflows: Mégiscane River.
- Basin countries: Canada
- Max. length: 17.2 kilometres (10.7 mi)
- Max. width: 2.4 kilometres (1.5 mi)
- Surface elevation: 393 metres (1,289 ft)

Canusio Lake is a freshwater body in the northeastern part of Senneterre in the La Vallée-de-l'Or Regional County Municipality (RCM), in the administrative region of Abitibi-Témiscamingue, in the province of Quebec, in Canada.

Canusio Lake is located in the township of Noiseux, Logan and Cherrier. Forestry is the main economic activity of the sector. Recreational tourism activities come second.

The hydrographic slope of Canusio Lake is accessible via a forest road (North–south direction) on the east side of the Saint-Cyr River Valley; in addition, another forest road (East–west direction) serves the South of the Mégiscane River.

The surface of Canusio Lake is usually frozen from early November to mid-May, however, safe ice circulation is generally from mid-November to mid-April.

== Geography ==
Canusio Lake has a total length of 17.2 kilometres (10.7 mi) and a maximum width of 2.4 kilometres (1.5 mi) in its southern part. This lake has a complex shape with an archipelago of islands, several peninsulas and bays. On the west side, this lake has a large swamp area. The surface of this lake is an altitude: 393 metres (1,289 ft).

Canusio Lake is fed by the Saint-Cyr River South (coming from the Northeast) and the Mégiscane River (coming from the South).

The mouth of Lake Canusio is located on the north shore of the lake, at:

- 29.0 kilometres (18.0 mi) northwest of the dam at the mouth of the lac du Poète which allows the diversion of water from the upper part of the Mégiscane River to Gouin Reservoir;
- 31.7 kilometres (19.7 mi) west of a bay on the west shore of Gouin Reservoir;
- 98.8 kilometres (61.4 mi) north-east of the mouth of the Mégiscane River (confluence with Parent Lake (Abitibi);
- 374 kilometres (232 mi) south-east of the mouth of the Nottaway River (confluence with Rupert Bay);
- 65.2 kilometres (40.5 mi) south-west of the village center of Obedjiwan;
- 101.2 kilometres (62.9 mi) south-east of the village center of Lebel-sur-Quévillon.

The main hydrographic slopes near Canusio Lake are:

- north side: Saint-Cyr Lake (Saint-Cyr River South), Saint-Cyr River South, Cherrier Lake, Mesplet Lake;
- east side: Dumont Lake, Pascagama Lake, Deschamps Lake, Pascagama River;
- south side: Ouiscatis Lake, Pascagama Lake, Mégiscane River, Suzie River;
- west side: Mégiscane lake, Mégiscane river.

== Toponymy ==
Formerly, this body of water was designated "Lake Matciskan".

The toponym "Lac Canusio" was formalized on December 5, 1968, by the Commission de toponymie du Québec, when it was created.

== See also ==
- James Bay
- Nottaway River, a watercourse
- Matagami Lake, a body of water
- Bell River, a watercourse
- Parent Lake (Abitibi), a body of water
- Mégiscane River, a watercourse
- Saint-Cyr River South, a watercourse
- Mégiscane Lake, a watercourse
- Senneterre, a city
- List of lakes of Canada
