= Barry Lake =

Lake in Senneterre, Quebec, Canada

- Watershed of Nottaway River

- Location within Quebec
- Location: Eeyou Istchee James Bay (municipality)
- Coordinates: 49°58′41″N 75°37′25″W
- Type: cola
- Primary inflows: Mégiscane River, Saint-Cyr River South.
- Primary outflows: Mégiscane River.
- Basin countries: Canada
- Max. length: 15.2 kilometres (9.4 mi)
- Max. width: 2.9 kilometres (1.8 mi)
- Surface area: 74 acres (30 ha)
- Average depth: 22 feet (6.7 m)
- Max. depth: 21 feet (6.4 m)
- Surface elevation: 392 metres (1,286 ft)

Barry Lake is a body of freshwater in the north-eastern part of Senneterre in the La Vallée-de-l'Or Regional County Municipality (RCM), in the administrative region of Abitibi-Témiscamingue, in the province of Quebec, in Canada.

Barry Lake is the head of the Saint-Cyr River South (slope of Mégiscane River) flowing south, and also the head of the Saint-Cyr River (slope of the Opawica River) flowing towards the North.

Barry Lake straddles the townships of Barry and Bailly. Forestry is the main economic activity of the sector. Recreational tourism activities come second.

The lake Barry watershed is accessible via a forest road (North-South direction) on the east side of the Saint-Cyr River Valley; in addition, another forest road (East-West direction) serves the northern part of the [Barry Lake Biodiversity Reserve] and connects the R1015 road west.

The surface of Barry Lake is usually frozen from early November to mid-May, however, safe ice movement is generally from mid-November to mid-April.

== Geography ==
Barry Lake has a total length of 15.2 kilometres (9.4 mi), four parts forming a deformed crescent open to the south. The surface of this lake is an altitude: 392 metres (1,286 ft). This lake is surrounded by marsh areas. This lake has an island of 1.6 kilometres (0.99 mi) in length centered near its northern outlet, overlapping the two townships.

This lake is fed by the discharge (coming from the South) of Robertine Lake.

The mouth of Barry Lake is located on the south shore of the southeastern portion of the lake at:

- 45.4 kilometres (28.2 mi) north of the mouth of the Saint-Cyr South River (confluence with the Mégiscane River;
- 44.7 kilometres (27.8 mi) northwest of a bay on the west shore of Gouin Reservoir;
- 129.4 kilometres (80.4 mi) north-east of the mouth of the Mégiscane River (confluence with Parent Lake (Abitibi);
- 353 kilometres (219 mi) south-east of the mouth of the Nottaway River (confluence with Rupert Bay);
- 56.0 kilometres (34.8 mi) north-east of the village center of Obedjiwan;
- 106 kilometres (66 mi) east of the village center of Lebel-sur-Quévillon.

== Toponymy ==
Formerly, this body of water was designated "Lake Matciskan".

The toponym "Lac Canusio" was formalized on December 5, 1968, by the Commission de toponymie du Québec, when it was created.

== See also ==
- James Bay
- Nottaway River, a watercourse
- Matagami Lake, a body of water
- Bell River, a watercourse
- Parent Lake (Abitibi), a body of water
- Mégiscane River, a watercourse
- Saint-Cyr River South, a watercourse
- Mégiscane Lake, a watercourse
- Senneterre, a city
- List of lakes of Canada
