= Bailly Lake (Saint-Cyr River South) =

Lake in Senneterre, Quebec, Canada

- Watershed of Nottaway River

- Location within Quebec
- Location: Eeyou Istchee James Bay (mconvertcipality)
- Coordinates: 48°56′01″N 75°33′29″W
- Type: Natural
- Primary inflows: Saint-Cyr River South.
- Primary outflows: Saint-Cyr River South.
- Basin countries: Canada
- Max. length: 6.7 kilometres (4.2 mi)
- Max. width: 3.0 kilometres (1.9 mi)
- Surface elevation: 392 metres (1,286 ft)

Bailly Lake is a body of freshwater in the north-eastern part of Senneterre in the Vallée-de-l'Or Regional County Municipality (RCM), in the administrative region of Abitibi-Témiscamingue, in the province of Quebec, in Canada.

Lake Bailly is crossed to the South Saint-Cyr River South. Lake Bailly is located entirely in the canton of Bailly. Forestry is the main economic activity of the sector. Recreational tourism activities come second.

The hydrographic slope of Lake Bailly is accessible via a forest road (North-South direction) on the east side of the Saint-Cyr River South Valley; in addition, another forest road (East-West direction) serves the northern part of the Bailly Lake Biodiversity Reserve and connects R1015 to the west.

The surface of Bailly Lake is usually frozen from early November to mid-May, however, safe ice circulation is generally from mid-November to mid-April.

== Geography ==
Lake Bailly has a total length of 6.7 kilometres (4.2 mi) along the length. This lake has a maximum width of 3.0 kilometres (1.9 mi) in its southern part thanks to a bay stretching eastward on 1.6 kilometres (0.99 mi). This lake has an island complex at its northern entrance and an island with a length of 0.5 kilometres (0.31 mi) located at its center. The surface of this lake is an altitude: 392 metres (1,286 ft). This lake is surrounded by marsh areas.

This lake is fed only by the Saint-Cyr River South (coming from the North).

The mouth of Lake Bailly is located on the south shore of the lake, namely:

- 32.2 kilometres (20.0 mi) north of the mouth of the Saint-Cyr River South (confluence with the Mégiscane River);
- 39.6 kilometres (24.6 mi) northwest of a bay on the west shore of Gouin Reservoir;
- 124.7 kilometres (77.5 mi) north-east of the mouth of the Mégiscane River (confluence with Parent Lake (Abitibi));
- 357 kilometres (222 mi) southeasterly of the mouth of the Nottaway River (confluence with Rupert Bay);
- 53.8 kilometres (33.4 mi) north-east of the village center of Obedjiwan;
- 105.2 kilometres (65.4 mi) east of the village center of Lebel-sur-Quévillon

== Toponymy ==
In this sector, the term "Bailly" is associated with the township and the lake.

The toponym "Lac Bailly" was formalized on December 5, 1968, by the Commission de toponymie du Québec, when it was created.

== See also ==
- James Bay
- Nottaway River, a watercourse
- Matagami Lake, a body of water
- Bell River, a watercourse
- Parent Lake (Abitibi), a body of water
- Mégiscane River, a watercourse
- Saint-Cyr River South, a watercourse
- Canusio Lake, a watercourse
- Saint-Cyr Lake (Saint-Cyr River South), a watercourse
- Senneterre, a city
- List of lakes in Canada
