= Mesplet =

Mesplet may refer to:

- Fleury Mesplet (1734–1794), a French-born Canadian printer best known for founding the Montreal Gazette
- Mesplet Lake, Quebec, Canada
