= Capousacataca River =

Capousacataca
- Watershed of Nottaway River

Location
- Country: Canada
- Province: Quebec
- Region: Abitibi-Témiscamingue

Physical characteristics
- Source: Leigne Lake
  - location: Senneterre, La Vallée-de-l'Or Regional County Municipality (RCM), Abitibi-Témiscamingue, Quebec
  - coordinates: 48°40′06″N 76°09′33″W
  - elevation: 389 m (1,276 ft)
- Mouth: Mégiscane River
  - location: Senneterre, La Vallée-de-l'Or Regional County Municipality, Abitibi-Témiscamingue, Quebec
  - coordinates: 48°30′37″N 76°25′05″W
  - elevation: 385 m (1,263 ft)
- Length: 17.4 km (10.8 mi)

Basin features
- Tributaries
  - left: (upstream); outlet of lake Kanijokamacik; outlet of lake Tremblay; outlet of a set of lakes including Akokodjic and Palazo; outlet of lake Goulish.
  - right: (upstream); outlet of lake Nibiciwâbo; outlet of lake Nibomimakizin.

The Capousacataca River is a tributary of the Mégiscane River, flowing into the north-eastern part of Senneterre in La Vallée-de-l'Or Regional County Municipality (RCM), in the administrative region of Abitibi-Témiscamingue, in Quebec, Canada.

The course of the river successively crosses the townships of Charrette and Girouard.

The Capousacataca River runs entirely on forest land north-east of the La Vérendrye Wildlife Reserve and on the west side of Gouin Reservoir. Forestry is the main economic activity of this hydrographic slope; recreational tourism activities, second. The surface of the river is usually frozen from the beginning of December to the end of April. The hydrographic slope of the Capousacataca River is served by the R0808 forest road that goes up this valley (first on the west side, then on the east side) to the south east of Charrette Lake, where the road is oriented towards the North -East.

== Geography ==
The Capousacataca River originates near the northern limit of the Abitibi-Témiscamingue administrative region at the mouth of lac Valets.

The mouth of this lake is located at the bottom of a Northeast bay at:

- 7.4 kilometres (4.6 mi) north of the confluence of the Capousacataca River with the Mégiscane River;
- 53.8 kilometres (33.4 mi) north-east of the confluence of the Mégiscane River with Parent Lake (Abitibi);
- 40.7 kilometres (25.3 mi) north of the Canadian National Railway's Paradise Station;
- 64.7 kilometres (40.2 mi) north-east of Senneterre.

The main hydrographic slopes near the Capousacataca River are:

- North side: Wetetnagami River, Lecompte River, O'Sullivan River;
- east side: Achepabanca River, Mégiscane River, Berthelot Lake (Mégiscane River);
- South side: Mégiscane River, Girouard Lake;
- West side: Tuillé Lake, Wiashgami Lake.

From the mouth of Lake Valets, the Capousacataca River flows over 17.4 kilometres (10.8 mi) according to the following segments:

- 5.2 kilometres (3.2 mi) northeasterly, forming a westerly curve to the north shore of a lake formed by a widening of the river;
- 2.5 kilometres (1.6 mi) north, then south, across a lake (length: ; altitude: 390 metres (1,280 ft)) formed by the widening of the river to its mouth;
- 1.1 kilometres (0.68 mi) southerly crossing Miglet Lake (length: 1.9 kilometres (1.2 mi); altitude: 378 metres (1,240 ft));
- 8.6 kilometres (5.3 mi) south by cutting off forest road R0808 to the confluence of the river

The Capousacataca River discharges on the west bank of a bend of the Mégiscane River. The latter usually flows westward, forming a large hook to the south. It is a tributary of the east shore of Parent Lake (Abitibi). The latter empties into the Bell River, a tributary of Matagami Lake which in turn flows into the Nottaway River, a tributary of the southeastern shore of the James Bay.

This confluence of the Capousacataca River with the Mégiscane River is located upstream of Lake Girouard. More specifically, the Capousacataca River flows to:

- 52.8 kilometres (32.8 mi) north-east of the confluence of the Mégiscane River with Parent Lake (Abitibi);
- 30.6 kilometres (19.0 mi) northwest of the Foresyth railway stop on the Canadian National Railway;
- 63.3 kilometres (39.3 mi) north-east of the village center of Senneterre;
- 73.4 kilometres (45.6 mi) south-east of the village center of Lebel-sur-Quévillon;
- 2.4 kilometres (1.5 mi) east of a bay on the east shore of lake Valets;
- 71.9 kilometres (44.7 mi) west of Gouin Reservoir.

== Toponymy ==
The hydronym "Capousacataca River" is of Native origin of the Algonquin nation, meaning "where there is a lot of dry wood". This toponym is indicated on a cartographic document dated 1940.

The toponym "Capousacataca River" was formalized on December 5, 1968, at the Commission de toponymie du Québec.

== See also ==
- Nottaway River, a watercourse
- Matagami Lake, a body of water
- Bell River, a watercourse
- Parent Lake (Abitibi), a body of water
- Mégiscane River, a watercourse
- Valets Lake, a body of water
- Gouin Reservoir, a body of water
- Senneterre, a city
- La Vallée-de-l'Or Regional County Municipality (RCM)
- List of rivers of Quebec
