= Faillon Lake =

Lake in Quebec, Canada

- Watershed of Nottaway River

- Location within Quebec
- Location: Senneterre
- Coordinates: 48°20′11″N 76°39′28″W
- Type: Natural
- Primary inflows: Mégiscane River; Bastian River; Arthur creek; Smoky creek.
- Primary outflows: Mégiscane River
- Basin countries: Canada
- Max. length: 18.3 kilometres (11.4 mi)
- Max. width: 2.2 kilometres (1.4 mi)
- Surface area: 24.8 kilometres (15.4 mi)
- Surface elevation: 355 metres (1,165 ft)

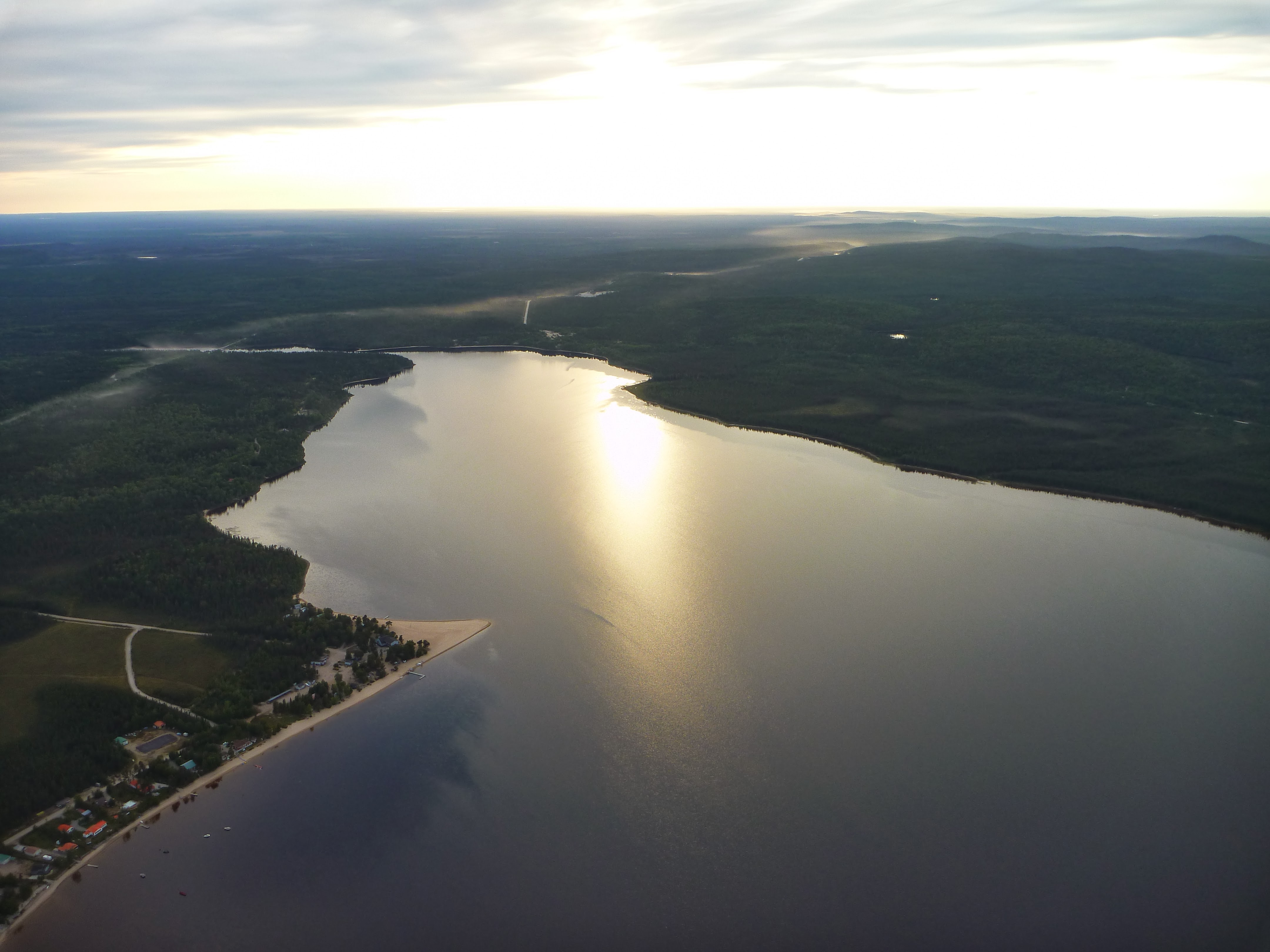
Faillon Lake

Faillon Lake is a freshwater body of the townships of Faillon (northeastern part) and Boisseau (southwestern part), in the territory of Senneterre, in La Vallée-de-l'Or Regional County Municipality (RCM), in the administrative region of Abitibi-Témiscamingue, in the province of Quebec, in Canada.

Lake Faillon is crossed to the Southwest by the current of the Mégiscane River.

Forestry is the main economic activity of the sector; recreational tourism activities come second. Its surface is generally frozen from the beginning of December to the end of April.

The hydrographic slope of Lake Faillon is mainly served by a forest road that goes north-east on the north bank of the Mégiscane River. The southwestern part of the lake is served by another branch of the forest road that runs east.

== Geography ==
This lake of 18.3 kilometres (11.4 mi) comprises is formed by an enlargement of the Mégiscane River. This lake includes Kwacidawagak Bay, located on the south shore of the lake; this bay receives the waters of a creek coming from the East.

Lake Faillon supplies mainly to the North-East by the Mégiscane River and to the North-West by the Bastien River.

The mouth of this lake is located southwest to:

- 35.0 kilometres (21.7 mi) north of the confluence of the Mégiscane River with Parent Lake (Abitibi);
- 38.8 kilometres (24.1 mi) east of downtown Senneterre;
- 6.0 kilometres (3.7 mi) north-east of the Canadian National Railway.

The main hydrographic slopes near lake Faillon are:

- North side: Bastien River, Collin River, Valets Lake;
- East side: Mégiscane River, Arthur Brook, Attic Lake;
- South side: Canyon Creek, Marquis River;
- West side: Mégiscane River, Collin River.

== Toponymy ==
In the past, this lake was called "Millie Lake". The Geography Commission of Quebec gave it its new name in 1921 in honor of the Sulpician Étienne-Michel Faillon (1799-1870), author, in 1865, of a publication entitled History of French colonization in Canada.

The name "Lac Faillon" was officialized on December 5, 1968 by the Commission de toponymie du Québec when it was created.

== See also ==
- Nottaway River, a watercourse
- Matagami Lake, a body of water
- Bell River, a watercourse
- Parent Lake (Abitibi), a body of water
- Mégiscane River, a watercourse
- Senneterre, a city
- La Vallée-de-l'Or Regional County Municipality (RCM)
- List of lakes in Canada
