= Rivière du Loup (Chaudière River tributary) =

River in Beauce-Sartigan and Estrie, Quebec, Canada

Rivière du Loup Old name: Rivière Linière
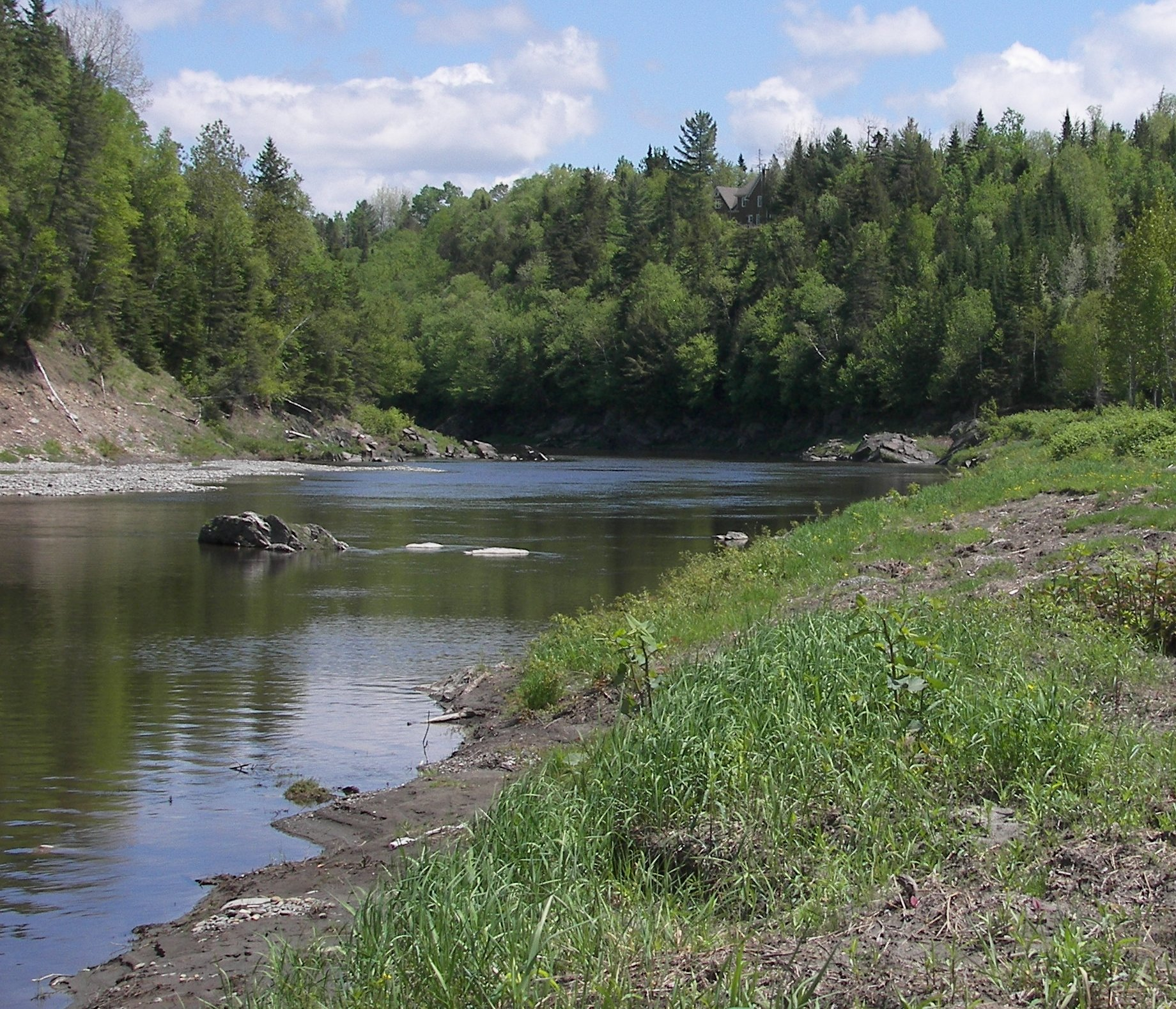
- Rivière du Loup

- Location within Quebec

Location
- Country: Canada
- Province: Quebec
- Region: Estrie, Chaudière-Appalaches
- MRC: Le Granit Regional County Municipality, Beauce-Sartigan Regional County Municipality

Physical characteristics
- Source: Lake Émilie
  - location: Saint-Robert-Bellarmin, (MRC) Le Granit Regional County Municipality, Québec
  - coordinates: 45.72474°N 70.431118°W
  - elevation: 618 metres (2,028 ft)
- Mouth: Chaudière River
  - location: Sartigan
  - coordinates: 46.08944°N 70.65111°W
  - elevation: 171 metres (561 ft)
- Length: 76.5 kilometres (47.5 mi)
- Basin size: 900 kilometres (559.23 mi)
- Discharge
  - location: Rivière du Loup (station:023428 - Pont-route at Saint-Côme)

Basin features
- Progression: Chaudière River, St. Lawrence River
- River system: St. Lawrence River
- Tributaries
  - left: (upstream) ruisseau Paquet, ruisseau Lestin, ruisseau Rochette, ruisseau Laplante, ruisseau Boutin, ruisseau Gilbert, ruisseau Poulin
  - right: (upstream) ruisseau Donocan, ruisseau Grenier, ruisseau Patrick, Vachon River, Metgermette River, ruisseau Moore, Wilson River, rivière du Portage, ruisseau Croche, ruisseau Oliva, Taschereau River, rivière du Monument, ruisseau Caouette, rivière Noire

The rivière du Loup (in English: river of Wolf) is a tributary of the east bank of the Chaudière River which flows northward to empty onto the south bank of the St. Lawrence River, in the region administrative office of Chaudière-Appalaches, in Quebec, in Canada.

The rivière du Loup empties on the east bank of the Chaudière River at a place called Sartigan, near Saint-Georges. It is the most important tributary of the Chaudière River in the county of Beauce.

== Toponymy ==
The toponym Rivière du Loup was made official on February 28, 1980, at the Commission de toponymie du Québec.

== See also ==
- List of rivers of Quebec
