= Collin River (Mégiscane River tributary) =

Collin
- Watershed of Nottaway River

Location
- Country: Canada
- Province: Quebec
- Region: Abitibi-Témiscamingue

Physical characteristics
- Source: Leigne Lake
  - location: Senneterre, La Vallée-de-l'Or Regional County Municipality (RCM), Abitibi-Témiscamingue, Quebec
  - coordinates: 48°26′26″N 76°46′35″W
  - elevation: 461 m (1,512 ft)
- Mouth: Mégiscane River
  - location: Senneterre, La Vallée-de-l'Or Regional County Municipality, Abitibi-Témiscamingue, Quebec
  - coordinates: 48°16′39″N 76°46′23″W
  - elevation: 340 m (1,120 ft)
- Length: 22.1 km (13.7 mi)

Basin features
- Tributaries
  - left: (upstream); outlet of lake Lamarche; outlet of lake Délisle.
  - right: (upstream); outlet of lakes Laurent and Lena.

Collin River is a tributary of the North Shore of the Mégiscane River, flowing into Senneterre, in La Vallée-de-l'Or Regional County Municipality, in the administrative region of Abitibi-Témiscamingue, Quebec, Canada.

The course of the river crosses successively the townships of Boisseau and Jurie.

The Collin River flows entirely in forest territory, generally towards the South crossing five bodies of water. Forestry is the main economic activity of this watershed. Road R0806 (Penetration Road) cuts from east to west the lower Collin River; secondary and forest roads serve the entire hydrographic slope. The surface of the river is usually frozen from mid-December to mid-April.

== Geography ==
The Collin River originates at the mouth of an unidentified lake (length: 2.0 kilometres (1.2 mi) formed in length in the North-South axis with a narrowing of the shoreline in the center of the lake; 461 metres (1,512 ft)).

The mouth of this head lake is located at 3.6 kilometres (2.2 mi) south-east of R0807 which runs northward to the west of Martin Lake; at 18.1 kilometres (11.2 mi) north of the confluence of the Collin River with the Mégiscane River; at 35.0 kilometres (21.7 mi) east of downtown Senneterre; and at 37.4 kilometres (23.2 mi) south-east of the mouth of Parent Lake (Abitibi).

The main hydrographic slopes near the Collin River are:

- North side: Lake Mayor-Bilodeau;
- East side: Doyon Lake, Bastien River, Faillon Lake, Mégiscane River;
- South side: Mégiscane River;
- West side: Martin Lake, Signay Creek, Sunday Creek, Brassier River, Parent Lake (Abitibi).

From its source, the Collin River flows over 22.1 kilometres (13.7 mi) according to the following segments:

- 4.0 kilometres (2.5 mi) southerly, crossing a first unidentified lake (length: altitude: 458 metres (1,503 ft)) and a second lake, to its mouth;
- 2.5 kilometres (1.6 mi) south across Regis Lake (length: 1.3 kilometres (0.81 mi); altitude: 425 metres (1,394 ft)) on its full length, up to at its mouth;
- 3.2 kilometres (2.0 mi) to the south, in particular, crossing an unidentified lake (length: 0.7 kilometres (0.43 mi); altitude: 417 metres (1,368 ft)), up to mouth of a second unidentified lake;
- 1.9 kilometres (1.2 mi) south to the outlet of Délisle Lake (coming from the North-East);
- 1.7 kilometres (1.1 mi) south to the outlet of Lamarche Lake (coming from the Northeast);
- 3.4 kilometres (2.1 mi) south to R0806 (Penetration Road);
- 5.4 kilometres (3.4 mi) south to confluence

The Collin River discharges on the north shore of the Mégiscane River (elevation: 340 metres (1,120 ft)) which flows southwest and then northwest to Parent Lake (Abitibi) which empties into the Bell River, a tributary of Matagami Lake. The latter lake in turn flows into the Nottaway River, a tributary of the southeastern shore of James Bay.

This confluence of the Collin River with the Mégiscane River flows to:

- 3.36 kilometres (2.09 mi) south-west of the mouth of Faillon Lake;
- 53.3 kilometres (33.1 mi) south-east of the mouth of Parent Lake (Abitibi);
- 35.2 kilometres (21.9 mi) south-east of the confluence of the Mégiscane River with Parent Lake (Abitibi);
- 1.8 kilometres (1.1 mi) north-east of the Canadian National Railway; the nearest rail stop being "Press";
- 36.9 kilometres (22.9 mi) east of the village center of Senneterre.

== Toponymy ==
The toponym "Collin River" was formalized on December 5, 1968, at the Commission de toponymie du Québec.

== See also ==
- Nottaway River, a watercourse
- Matagami Lake, a body of water
- Bell River, a watercourse
- Parent Lake (Abitibi), a body of water
- Mégiscane River, a watercourse
- Senneterre, a city
- La Vallée-de-l'Or Regional County Municipality (RCM)
- List of rivers of Quebec
