= Saint-Cyr (surname) =

Saint-Cyr is a French surname. Notable people with the surname include:

== Saint-Cyr ==
- Charles de Saint-Cyr (1875–1940), French footballer
- Claude Carra Saint-Cyr (1760–1830), French general
- Claude Saint-Cyr (1911–2002), French fashion designer
- Guillaume de Saint-Cyr, French athlete
- Jacques-Antoine de Révéroni Saint-Cyr (1767–1829), French man of letters
- Laurent, Marquis de Gouvion Saint-Cyr (1764–1830), Marshal of France

== St. Cyr ==
- Adolphus Frederic St. Sure (1869–1949), United States District Judge.(name anglicized)
- Cyprian St Cyr, pseudonym of Eric Berne, Canadian-American psychoanalyst and founder of Transactional Analysis
- John St. Cyr (1936-2022), American politician and judge
- Johnny St. Cyr (1890–1966), American banjoist
- Jordan St. Cyr, Canadian recording artist
- Lili St. Cyr (1918–1999), pseudonym of Willis Marie Van Schaac, prominent American burlesque stripper
