= Étienne-Michel Faillon =

French historian

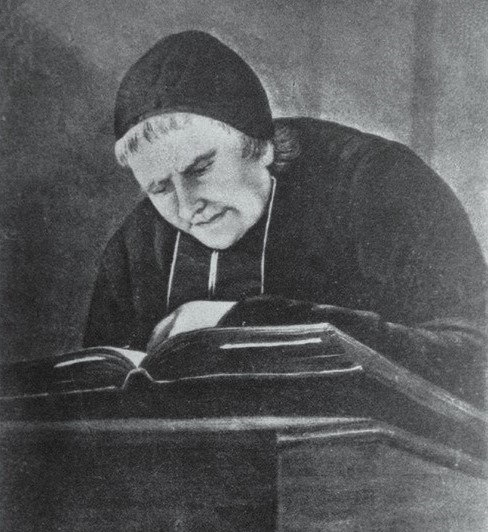
Étienne-Michel Faillon.

Étienne-Michel Faillon (3 January 1800 – 25 October 1870) was a Catholic historian.

== Biography ==
Faillon was born in Tarascon, France. He studied in Avignon and Aix-en-Provence, joined the Sulpicians (1821), and was ordained priest in 1824. While director of "La Solitude", he wrote several ascetic and biographical works and collected materials for future publications.

In 1848, during an official visit to Montreal, he conceived the plan of his Histoire de la Colonie française au Canada (History of the French Colony in Canada). Of the twelve intended volumes of this work, intended to embrace the entire period of French rule (1534–1759), only three were published, the narrative closing with the year 1675. Two subsequent voyages to Canada enabled him to write several important biographies, those of Sister Marguerite Bourgeoys, of Jeanne Mance (with the history of the Hôtel-Dieu, Ville-Marie), of Marie-Marguerite d'Youville, and of Jeanne Le Ber. He died in Paris.

== Works ==
His chief works relating to Old France are his life of Jean-Jacques Olier and Monuments inédits sur l'apostolat de Sainte Marie-Madeleine en Provence. He has been repeatedly criticized for his partiality towards his society, to Montreal and to the Jesuits. On the other hand, he has been credited for giving prominence to persons and events of Ville-Marie, less elaborately treated by the Jesuit "Relations" and later histories.

- Faillon, Étienne-Michel (1835). Monumens de l'église de Sainte-Marthe à Tarascon, département des Bouches-du-Rhône. Tarascon: Élisée Aubanel, Imprimeur-libraire.

== Memory ==
Several places in the province of Quebec, in Canada, are named after Étienne-Michel Faillon. They include Faillon Lake, Faillon Canton, Rue Faillon Est in Montreal, and Rue Faillon in Sherbrooke.
