= Senneterre, Quebec (parish) =

Senneterre
- Parish municipality
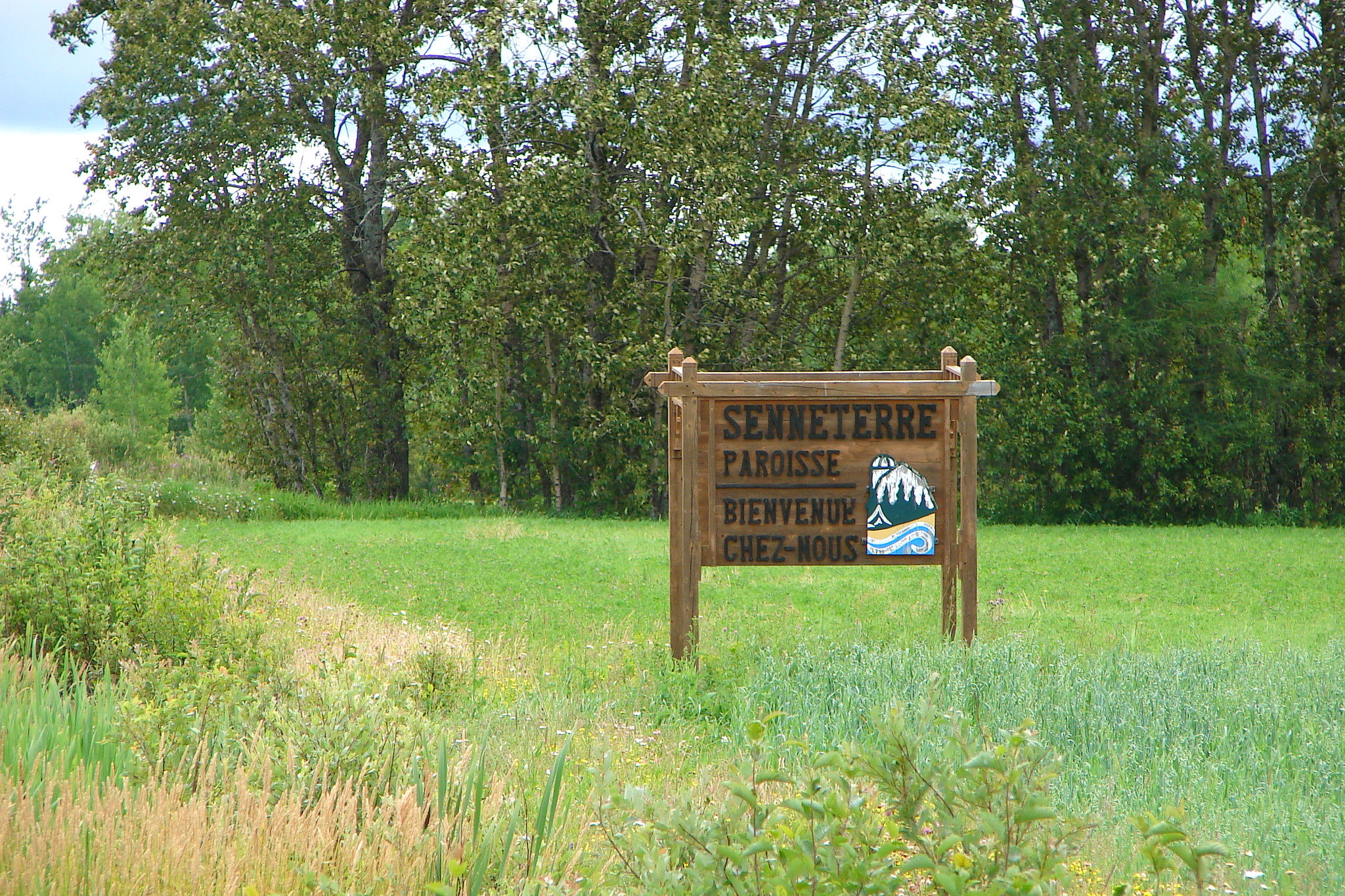

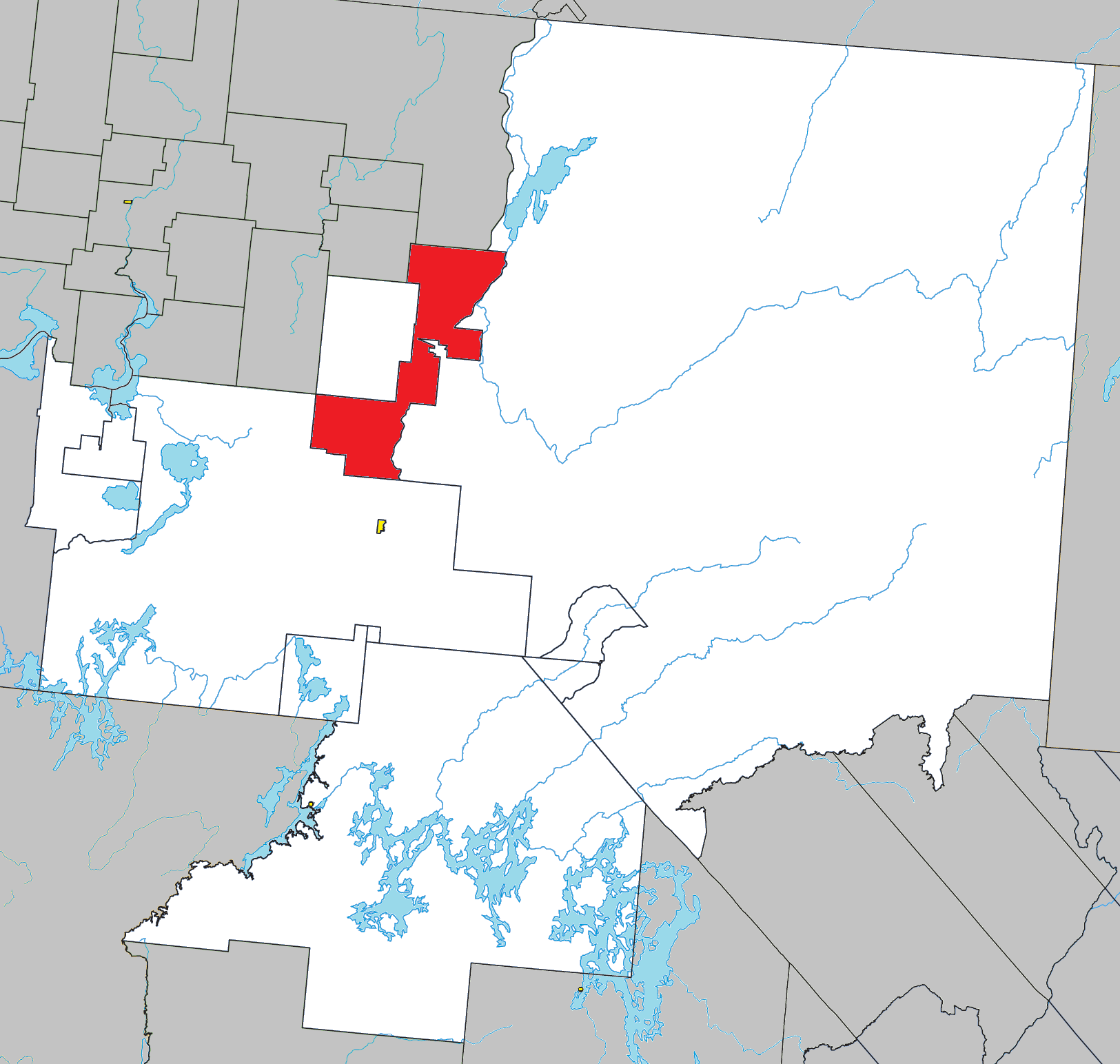
- Location within La Vallée-de-l'Or RCM

- Location in province of Quebec
- Coordinates: 48°23′N 77°15′W
- Country: Canada
- Province: Quebec
- Region: Abitibi-Témiscamingue
- RCM: La Vallée-de-l'Or
- Settled: 1910s
- Constituted: March 23, 1923

Government
  - Mayor: Jacline Rouleau
  - Federal riding: Abitibi—Baie-James— Nunavik—Eeyou
  - Prov. riding: Abitibi-Est

Area
  - Total: 630.08 km^{2} (243.28 sq mi)
  - Land: 567.05 km^{2} (218.94 sq mi)
- Elevation: 301 m (988 ft)

Population (2021)
  - Total: 1,202
  - Density: 2.1/km^{2} (5.4/sq mi)
  - Pop (2016-21): ▲0.8%
  - Dwellings: 606
- Time zone: UTC−5 (EST)
  - Summer (DST): UTC−4 (EDT)
- Postal code(s): J0Y 2M0
- Area code: 819
- Highways: R-113 R-386
- Website: www.paroissesenneterre.qc.ca

Senneterre (French pronunciation: [sɛntɛʁ]) is a parish municipality in northwestern Quebec, Canada, in the La Vallée-de-l'Or Regional County Municipality. The parish is mostly a rural municipality that almost completely surrounds the actual population centre of the neighbouring City of Senneterre.

The place is named after the geographic township of Senneterre, that in turn was named in honour of a captain of the Languedoc Regiment that fought under General Montcalm.

== History ==
In 1916, the geographic township was formed, and in 1923, the Township Municipality of Senneterre-Partie-Est was established out of the township's eastern part. In November 1931, it annexed the remainder of the geographic township (west and east of the Bell River), except for Senneterre-Partie-Ouest. It shortened its name and changed statutes to the Parish Municipality of Senneterre in 1949.

In 1964 and 1969, the City of Senneterre annexed portions of its territory.

== Demographics ==
In the 2021 Census of Population conducted by Statistics Canada, Senneterre had a population of 1,202 living in 559 of its 606 total private dwellings, a change of 0.8% from its 2016 population of 1,192. With a land area of 567.05 km^{2} (218.94 sq mi), it had a population density of 2.1/km^{2} (5.5/sq mi) in 2021.

Canada census – Senneterre, Quebec (parish) community profile

	2021	2016
Population	1,202 (+0.8% from 2016)	1,192 (-2.1% from 2011)
Land area	567.05 km^{2} (218.94 sq mi)	568.88 km^{2} (219.65 sq mi)
Population density	2.1/km^{2} (5.4/sq mi)	2.1/km^{2} (5.4/sq mi)
Median age	55.2 (M: 55.6, F: 53.6)	51.9 (M: 52.5, F: 51.2)
Private dwellings	606 (total) 559 (occupied)	563 (total) 539 (occupied)
Median household income	$74,500	$67,226

References: 2021 2016

Historical census populations – Senneterre, Quebec (parish)

Year	Pop.	±%
1931	180	—
1941	673	+273.9%
1951	970	+44.1%
1956	1,485	+53.1%
1961	1,379	−7.1%
1966	1,161	−15.8%

Year	Pop.	±%
1971	551	−52.5%
1976	674	+22.3%
1981	810	+20.2%
1986	1,122	+38.5%
1991	1,082	−3.6%
1996	1,169	+8.0%

Year	Pop.	±%
2001	1,192	+2.0%
2006	1,186	−0.5%
2011	1,218	+2.7%
2016	1,192	−2.1%
2021	1,202	+0.8%

Population counts are not adjusted for boundary changes.
Source: Statistics Canada

Mother tongue (2021):

- English as first language: 0.8 %
- French as first language: 97.9 %
- English and French as first language: 0.4 %
- Other as first language: 0.4 %

== Local government ==
List of former mayors:

- Julien Beauvais (1923–1930)
- Eugène Prévost (1931–1933, 1937–1940)
- Louis Major (1933–1936)
- Joseph Gagné (1941–1953)
- Édouard Duval (1953–1957)
- Azarie Paquin (1957–1958)
- Charles-Eugène Fortier (1959–1960)
- Gérard St-Pierre (1961–1963, 1966–1971)
- Gaston Beaudoin (1963–1965)
- Victor Leroux (1971–1975)
- Jean-Marie Chiasson (1975–1985)
- Louis-marie Martin (1985–1993)
- Pierre Patry (1993–1997)
- Raymond Bilodeau (1997–2005)
- Céliane Taillefer (2005–2009)
- Jacline Rouleau (2009–present)
