= Taschereau River =

River in Chaudière-Appalaches, Quebec, Canada

- Location within Quebec
- Native name: Rivière Taschereau (French)

Location
- Country: Canada
- Province: Quebec
- Region: Chaudière-Appalaches
- MRC: Beauce-Sartigan Regional County Municipality

Physical characteristics
- Source: Mountain stream, located near the border of Maine (United States) and Quebec
  - location: Saint-Théophile
  - coordinates: 45.886336°N 70.394015°W
  - elevation: 486 metres (1,594 ft)
- Mouth: Rivière du Loup
  - location: Saint-Théophile
  - coordinates: 45.89111°N 70.455°W
  - elevation: 343 metres (1,125 ft)
- Length: 8.0 kilometres (5.0 mi)

Basin features
- Progression: Rivière du Loup, Chaudière River, St. Lawrence River
- River system: St. Lawrence River
- Tributaries
  - left: (upstream)
  - right: (upstream)

The rivière Taschereau (in English: Taschereau River) flows in the municipality of Saint-Théophile, in the Beauce-Sartigan Regional County Municipality, in the administrative region of Chaudière-Appalaches, in Quebec, in Canada.

== Toponymy ==
The toponym Rivière Taschereau was formalized on December 5, 1968, at the Commission de toponymie du Québec.

== See also ==
- List of rivers of Quebec
