= Delestres River =

Delestres
- Watershed of Nottaway River

Location
- Country: Canada
- Province: Quebec
- Region: Abitibi-Témiscamingue

Physical characteristics
- Source: Lalochetière Lake
  - location: Senneterre, La Vallée-de-l'Or Regional County Municipality (RCM), Abitibi-Témiscamingue, Quebec
  - coordinates: 43°30′15″N 76°47′59″W
  - elevation: 420 m (1,380 ft)
- Mouth: Bell River, Parent Lake (Abitibi)
  - location: Senneterre, La Vallée-de-l'Or Regional County Municipality, Abitibi-Témiscamingue, Quebec
  - coordinates: 48°46′50″N 76°53′56″W
  - elevation: 305 m (1,001 ft)
- Length: 43.6 km (27.1 mi)

Basin features
- Tributaries
  - left: (upstream); outlet of lake Kâkinogamak; outlet of lakes Negoganatek and Martin; outlet of lake Doyon and lac of Mayor Bilodeau.
  - right: (upstream); outlet of lake Monzonite; outlet of lakes Twin South and lake Foetus; outlet of lakes Des Caches.

The Delestres River is a tributary of the northeastern shore of Parent Lake (Abitibi) (the Bell River hydrographic slope, the Nottaway River and the Rupert Bay). The Delestres River flows in Senneterre, in the administrative region of Abitibi-Témiscamingue, in Quebec, in Canada.

The Delestres River flows successively into the townships of Martin, Augier and Delestre. The lower portion of the river is included in the Parent Lake Marsh Biodiversity Reserve.

The surface of the Delestres River is generally frozen from mid-December to mid-April. Forestry is the main economic activity of the sector; recreational tourism activities, second.

== Geography ==
The adjacent hydrographic slopes of the Delestres River are:
- north side: Robin River, Cuvillier River, Tonnancour River;
- east side: Lecompte River, Valets Lake, O'Sullivan River, Mégiscane River;
- south side: Sunday Creek, Signay Creek, Collin River;
- west side: Owl River, Brassier River, Parent Lake, Bell River.

The Delestres River originated in Senneterre, at the mouth of Lalochetière Lake (length: 3.5 kilometres (2.2 mi), altitude: 420 metres (1,380 ft)). This head lake receives its tributary waters, one on the east side draining a set of lakes and the other on the west side. This source is located 32.9 kilometres (20.4 mi) south-east of the mouth of the Delestres River and 34.6 kilometres (21.5 mi) southeast of the mouth of Parent Lake.

From the mouth of Lalochetière Lake, the Delestres River flows over 43.6 kilometres (27.1 mi) according to the following segments:

- 7.1 kilometres (4.4 mi) northeasterly to a forest road;
- 5.4 kilometres (3.4 mi) westerly across rapids to a bend in the river;
- 31.1 kilometres (19.3 mi) to the northwest by collecting numerous streams from the northeast to its confluence.

The Delestres River flows into the bottom of Ignace Bay, which is bordered by a pier on the east and north side. This bay is surrounded by swamps on the south side. This bay is part of a small delta in the northeastern part of Parent Lake (Abitibi). This delta is fed by the mouths of the rivers Robin, Lecompte and Delestres. This confluence is located at:

- 2.6 kilometres (1.6 mi) northeast of the mouth of the Robin River;
- 12.8 kilometres (8.0 mi) north-east of the mouth of Parent Lake (Abitibi);
- 50.8 kilometres (31.6 mi) north of downtown Senneterre;
- 32.0 kilometres (19.9 mi) south-east of the village center of Lebel-sur-Quévillon;
- 122.8 kilometres (76.3 mi) south-east of downtown Matagami.

== Toponymy ==
The term "Delestres" is associated with the river and township that covers the central and southern part of Parent Lake (Abitibi). The name Delestres of these two hydronyms is a dedication to Alonié Delestre (spelled without "s" according to the historian André Vachan), a companion of Dollard Des Ormeaux. Before the proclamation of the township in 1916, the river was designated "Shabogama", Algonquian expression meaning "water penetrates".

The toponym "Delestres River" was formalized on December 5, 1968, at the Commission de toponymie du Quebec.

== See also ==
- Nottaway River, a watercourse
- Bell River, a watercourse
- Rupert Bay
- James Bay
- Parent Lake (Abitibi)
- Senneterre
- James Bay
- List of rivers of Quebec
