= Mégiscane Lake =

- Watershed of Nottaway River

- Location within Quebec
- Location: Senneterre
- Coordinates: 48°35′07″N 75°51′57″W
- Type: Reservoir lake
- Primary inflows: Mégiscane River, Closse River
- Primary outflows: Mégiscane River
- Basin countries: Canada
- Max. length: 22.7 kilometres (14.1 mi)
- Max. width: 6.7 kilometres (4.2 mi)
- Surface elevation: 385 metres (1,263 ft)

The Mégiscane Lake sits in the municipality of Senneterre (parish), in La Vallée-de-l'Or Regional County Municipality (RCM), in the administrative region of Abitibi-Témiscamingue, in Quebec, in Canada.

== Geography ==
Lake Mégiscane is located in forest in Abitibi, between Lebel-sur-Quévillon and the Gouin Reservoir. The main lakes surrounding are:
- north, Cherrier Lake,
- to the east, the lakes Canusio, Ouiscatis and Dumont,
- in the West, Kamiskonamebanikâk, Kâmâkociwak, Maricourt and Berthelot lakes.

The shape of Lake Mégiscane is very complex. This lake is made in length (from south-west to north-east), with three important enlargements:

- the southern part of the lake is 8.5 kilometres (5.3 mi) (including the strait connecting it to the central part) and its maximum width is 1 kilometre (0.62 mi). The Bay of Wolves is located on the west shore;
- the central part has a length of 8.5 kilometres (5.3 mi) by 8.5 kilometres (5.3 mi) of maximum width. It has a large island of 32 kilometres (20 mi) with 18 kilometres (11 mi) at its center;
- the northern part has a length of 9.0 kilometres (5.6 mi), with a maximum width of 6 kilometres (3.7 mi). Lake Arlette flows into the northern part.
Lake Mégiscane flows through the north of its central part, into the river of the same name.

== Toponymy ==
The toponym "Mégiscane" is of Algonquin origin and refers to a river, a lake, a dam and a locality. This Algonquin term translates as fish hook or bait. Testimonies of the time reveal that the Algonquins were fishing at the line intensively on the Mégiscane River. This toponym includes several spellings according to the explorers' reports: Megiskan, Métiskan and Métiscan.

The toponym "Lac Mégiscane" was inscribed on December 5, 1968, at the Bank of Place Names of the Commission de toponymie du Québec.

== See also ==
- James Bay
- Nottaway River, a watercourse
- Matagami Lake, a water body
- Bell River, a watercourse
- Mégiscane River, a watercourse
- Abitibi-Témiscamingue
- Senneterre (parish)
