= Mégiscane River =

Mégiscane
- Watershed of Nottaway River

Location
- Country: Canada
- Province: Quebec
- Region: Nord-du-Québec

Physical characteristics
- Source: Françoise Lake (Mégiscane River)
  - location: Senneterre, Abitibi-Témiscamingue, Quebec
  - coordinates: 48°07′15″N 75°39′50″W
  - elevation: 470 m (1,540 ft)
- Mouth: Parent Lake (Abitibi), Bell River
  - location: Eeyou Istchee James Bay (municipality), Abitibi-Témiscamingue; Lac-Despinassy unorganized territory, Quebec
  - coordinates: 48°29′00″N 77°08′00″W
  - elevation: 301 m (988 ft)
- Length: 249.6 km (155.1 mi)

Basin features
- Tributaries
  - left: Tavernier River; Assup River; Attic River; Cedar creek; Smoky creek; Arthur creek; Hubert creek; Michaud creek; Hermine creek; Berthelot River (Mégiscane River); Whitegoose River; outlet of Racicot Lake; Serpent River (Mégiscane River); Kekek River; Suzie River; Provancher Creek.
  - right: Sunday creek; Signay creek; Collin River (Mégiscane River tributary); Brown creek; Godin creek; Bastien River; Jim creek; Roby creek; Capousacataca River; outlet of lac aux Roches; Achepabanca River; Macho River; outlet of Misères Lake; Outlet of Cherrier Lake; Saint-Cyr Lake and Bailly.

The Mégiscane River is a tributary of Parent Lake (Abitibi). It flows in the Northwest of Quebec, in Canada, in the administrative regions of:

- Mauricie: in the westernmost part of the town of La Tuque;
- Abitibi-Témiscamingue: in the territory of Senneterre (parish), in Abitibi Regional County Municipality. Its mouth is located in the unorganized territory of Lac-Despinassy, Quebec.

The Mégiscane River is one of the most important rivers in the region of Abitibi-Témiscamingue. It has the reputation of being a privileged place to fish for sturgeon.

Forestry is the main economic activity of this watershed; recreational tourism activities come second. The surface of the river is generally frozen from mid-December to the end of April.

== Geography ==
The Mégiscane River rises at the mouth of Lac Françoise (length: 1.3 kilometres (0.81 mi); elevation: 434 metres (1,424 ft)). This lake is located on the east side of Barrot Lake (which is the head lake of the Chênevert River), at:

- 1.4 kilometres (0.87 mi) east of the Suzie River;
- 14 kilometres (8.7 mi) west of the boundary between the administrative regions of Mauricie (La Tuque) and Abitibi-Témiscamingue (Senneterre);
- 42.9 kilometres (26.7 mi) south-west of a bay Gouin reservoir;
- 121.5 kilometres (75.5 mi) east of downtown Senneterre;
- 116.3 kilometres (72.3 mi) east of the confluence of the Mégiscane River with Parent Lake (Abitibi).

In its upper part, this river first runs 24.0 kilometres (14.9 mi) in Senneterre, then 27.5 kilometres (17.1 mi) in La Tuque, along the northern boundary of the administrative region of Abitibi-Témiscamingue, where it crosses the lakes of Poète, Rivas and Tête. The current of this river then returns in Senneterre and crosses in particular the lakes Pascagama, Canusio, Mégiscane Lake, Berthelot and Faillon. This river ends in Parent Lake not far from Senneterre. In total, it travels 249.6 kilometres (155.1 mi) with an average flow of 392 m³/s.

Upper Mégiscane River (segment of 43.1 kilometres (26.8 mi))

From the mouth of Lake Francoise, the Mégiscane River flows over:

- 1.8 kilometres (1.1 mi) north, crossing Lakes Madeleine, Roger and Jean-George, to the Canadian National Railway;
- 2.0 kilometres (1.2 mi) north, crossing Lake Octavia (elevation: 433 metres (1,421 ft)) on its full length;
- 6.6 kilometres (4.1 mi) to the north, crossing Lake Oublié and Lake Chassiagne (elevation: 426 metres (1,398 ft)), on 4.9 kilometres (3.0 mi), passing east of Eagle Mountain (summit reaching 458 metres (1,503 ft));
- 2.7 kilometres (1.7 mi) to the north, crossing Lake Tower (elevation: 426 metres (1,398 ft)) on its full length. Note: The summit of Fireguard Mountain, located west of Lake Tower, reaches 512 metres (1,680 ft);
- 6.3 kilometres (3.9 mi) to the north, crossing Lake Bouillet (elevation: 423 metres (1,388 ft)) and the southern part of Angéline Lake (elevation: 418 metres (1,371 ft));
- 3.2 kilometres (2.0 mi) East, crossing the northern part of Lac Bonhomme (elevation: 411 metres (1,348 ft)) on 1.6 kilometres (0.99 mi);
- 8.9 kilometres (5.5 mi) to the North, then the North-East by cutting the boundary between Abitibi-Témiscamingue and Mauricie, to the South shore of "Rat d'Eau Lake" (English: Water Rat Lake) (elevation: 405 metres (1,329 ft)). Note: This lake receive on its East shore the water coming from Provancher Creek;
- 7.5 kilometres (4.7 mi) to the North in Mauricie, crossing the "Rat d'Eau Lake" (elevation: 426 metres (1,398 ft)) which is formed by the widening of the river;
- 4.1 kilometres (2.5 mi) west, then north in Mauricie crossing Poète Lake (elevation: 405 metres (1,329 ft)). Note: The "Barrage de la Mégiscane" (English: Mégiscane Dam"), a Hydro-Québec dam, was built in 1954 (then modified in 1992) in earth material at the outlet of Du Poète Lake (Mégiscane River) (English: "Lake of the Poet"). With a length of 5,011 metres (16,440 ft) and a height of 9.8 metres (32 ft), this dam can hold up to 7 590 000 000 cubic meters of water. This dam has five infrastructures including two dikes and three dams. It was designated "Mégiscane Dam" until September 18, 2002; then, the Mégiscane dam. An auxiliary weir has been built on the east side of the lake, which empties into the Gouin Reservoir. It was once called "Barrage Mégiscane", up to September 18, 2002; then, "Barrage de la Mégiscane". A second dam was built at the auxiliary weir which empty toward Gouin Reservoir.

Intermediate course of the Mégiscane River (downstream of Du Poète Lake and upstream from Mégiscane Lake) (segment of 71.0 kilometres (44.1 mi))

From the mouth of "Lac du poète" (English: "Lake of the Poet"), the Mégiscane River flows over:

- 4.5 kilometres (2.8 mi) to the North in Mauricie, crossing the lake Rivas (elevation: 397 metres (1,302 ft));
- 6.8 kilometres (4.2 mi) to the North, crossing the Head Lake (length: 7.8 kilometres (4.8 mi); elevation: 396 metres (1,299 ft));
- 7.8 kilometres (4.8 mi) to the North, then to the South-West by cutting the eastern limit of Abitibi-Témiscamingue, until the confluence of the outlet of Bernier Lake (Suzie River) (coming from the South) and the mouth of Suzie River;
- 9.9 kilometres (6.2 mi) northwesterly, then southwesterly, across the southern part of Pascagama Lake (elevation: 388 metres (1,273 ft));
- 9.0 kilometres (5.6 mi) southwesterly to the confluence of the Kekek River (from the south);
- 13.5 kilometres (8.4 mi) to the North, crossing Ouiscatis Lake (elevation: 388 metres (1,273 ft)) on 12.8 kilometres (8.0 mi);
- 9.2 kilometres (5.7 mi) southwesterly, then north, crossing the Canusio Lake (elevation: 388 metres (1,273 ft));
- 10.3 kilometres (6.4 mi) southwesterly, then northwesterly, crossing the Mégiscane Lake (elevation: 387 metres (1,270 ft));

Intermediate course of the Mégiscane River (downstream from Lake Mégiscane) (segment of 78.2 kilometres (48.6 mi))

From the mouth of Mégiscane Lake, the Mégiscane River flows over:

- 11.3 kilometres (7.0 mi) southwesterly to the east shore of Berthelot Lake;
- 8.6 kilometres (5.3 mi) southwesterly, crossing the Berthelot Lake (elevation: 385 metres (1,263 ft)). Note: Berthelot Lake receives on the South side the waters of the Berthelot River (Mégiscane River) and on the North side, Macho River;
- 7.3 kilometres (4.5 mi) southwesterly to the confluence of the Achepabanca River (coming from the North);
- 15.3 kilometres (9.5 mi) southwesterly crossing on 4.6 kilometres (2.9 mi) the northern part of Girouard Lake to the confluence of the Capousacataca River (coming from the North);
- 10.6 kilometres (6.6 mi) southwesterly to the bridge over the river, just upstream of Hubert Creek (coming from the east);
- 6.8 kilometres (4.2 mi) southwesterly to the northeastern shore of Faillon Lake;
- 18.3 kilometres (11.4 mi) southwesterly, crossing the Faillon Lake (width: 2.2 kilometres (1.4 mi); elevation: 355 metres (1,165 ft)) on its full length, to its mouth. Note: The forest road crosses the bridge at the mouth of the lake to connect the road junction of the north shore of the lake.

Lower Mégiscane River (segment of 57.2 kilometres (35.5 mi)) From the mouth of Faillon Lake, the Mégiscane River flows over:

- 5.0 kilometres (3.1 mi) southwesterly to the confluence of the Collin River (Mégiscane River tributary) (coming from the North);
- 5.2 kilometres (3.2 mi) towards the South-West, until a first fall;
- 3.9 kilometres (2.4 mi) southwesterly, cutting the Canadian National Railway, until a second fall;
- 10.4 kilometres (6.5 mi) southwesterly, forming a southerly curve in a marsh zone to Signay Brook (coming from the North);
- 15.3 kilometres (9.5 mi) northwesterly to Sunday Creek (coming from the North);
- 3.2 kilometres (2.0 mi) south, to the confluence of the Tavernier River (coming from the Southeast);
- 10.4 kilometres (6.5 mi) northwesterly, forming a southerly curve through a marsh zone to the Canadian National Railway;
- 3.8 kilometres (2.4 mi) to the northwest, cutting a forest road, to the confluence of the river.

The Mégiscane River flows on the east shore of Parent Lake (Abitibi) between two strips of land that extend westward into the lake at:

- 13.5 kilometres (8.4 mi) north of downtown Senneterre;
- 27.9 kilometres (17.3 mi) south of the mouth of Parent Lake (Abitibi);
- 19.4 kilometres (12.1 mi) south of the confluence of the Brassier River with Parent Lake (Abitibi).

== Toponymy ==
Its name, like that of the lake, derives from the Algonquin metshishkan or mesiskine and means hook, with reference to its quality as a fishing spot.

An 1898 map of the province of Quebec mentions the "Mekiskan River" to designate this watercourse. A geological map dated 1935 refers rather to the name "Monet River".

The toponym "Mégiscane River" was formalized on December 5, 1968, at the Commission de toponymie du Québec.

== Hydropower generation ==
During the 1940s and 1950s, the Shawinigan Water & Power Company, which held the water power concession of the Saint-Maurice River, conducted several studies to evaluate the potential diversion of rivers to its rivers with hydroelectric plants. After several hesitations, the Government of Quebec authorizes the partial diversion of the Mégiscane to the Saint-Maurice River basin in 1951.

The dam was built in 1954 in the municipality of La Tuque, in Mauricie. A second dam and a canal sometimes serve to partially divert the flow of the river to feed the Gouin reservoir and the hydroelectric dams of the Saint-Maurice River.

This project was carried out in parallel with the installation of additional turbines at the Rapide-Blanc, Trenche and La Tuque. The total cost of the project, which has increased the company's installed capacity of 150,000 horsepower (110,000 kW) (120 megawatts (160,000 hp)), is estimated to $14 million.

== See also ==
- Abitibi-Témiscamingue
- Senneterre
- La Tuque
- Lac-Despinassy, Quebec, an unorganized territory
- James Bay
- Du Poète Lake (Mégiscane River), a body of water
- Pascagama Lake, a body of water
- Mégiscane Lake, a body of water
- Berthelot Lake (Mégiscane River), a body of water
- Faillon Lake, a body of water
- Gouin Reservoir
- Parent Lake (Abitibi), a body of water
- List of rivers of Quebec
