= Parent Lake =

Lake in Senneterre, Quebec, Canada

- Watershed of Nottaway River

- Location within Quebec
- Location: Senneterre
- Coordinates: 48°39′08″N 77°03′49″W
- Primary inflows: South shore: Bell River (via " Passe à l’Épinette "); West shore (du Sud vers le Nord): Raymond creek, outlet of Tremblay Lake, Boucane River (via Boucane Lake); East shore (from South to North): Hibou River (Parent Lake), Brassier River, Mégiscane River, Senneterre River, Robin River (Parent Lake), Delestres River.
- Primary outflows: Bell River.
- Basin countries: Canada
- Max. length: 53.0 kilometres (32.9 mi)
- Max. width: 6.0 kilometres (3.7 mi)
- Surface area: 122 kilometres (76 mi)
- Surface elevation: 301 metres (988 ft)

Parent Lake is an enlargement of the Bell River, flowing northwest into the Matagami Lake. It is located in a swampy area of Abitibi Regional County Municipality, a short distance northeast of Senneterre and about 65 kilometres (40 mi) northeast of Val-d'Or.

Recreational tourism activities, including boating, are developed in this sector. From the Senneterre railway bridge, it is possible to sail north 50 kilometres (31 mi) via the Chenal de l'Épinette which joins up at Parent Lake at the mouth of the Robin River. Pleasure craft may navigate up to an additional 4.2 kilometres (2.6 mi) in the formed delta using either the Robin River or 2.7 kilometres (1.7 mi) in Ignace Bay, where the Delestres River flows, and partly up these rivers.

The Parent Lake watershed is serviced on the west side by route 113, which connects Senneterre and Lebel-sur-Quévillon.

== Geography ==
This large, irregularly-shaped lake is fed by numerous streams, including the Robin and Delestres rivers to the northeast and Mégiscane River to the southeast.

This lake has a length of 53 kilometres (33 mi), a width of 6 kilometres (3.7 mi), and an area of almost 122 km^{2}. The main islands are Wigwam Island (the largest in area), Bannerman Island, and Prospect Island. Among the other small islands are: White Island, Round Island, and Real Island. The "Passe de l’Esturgeon” (English: Sturgeon Pass) is located between the east shore of the lake and Wigwam Island. The "Passe de l’Épinette” (English: Spruce Pass), which is located between the west bank of the Bell River and the northward peninsula, connects the Senneterre Lake upstream.

== Fishing ==
Fishing for walleye, pike, and yellow perch is excellent. There is one public fishing lodge, The Lodge at Parent Lake, otherwise known as Domaine Du Lac Parent, that sits along route 113. They have cabins that can accompany between 2-8 guests.

== Toponymy ==
Replacing the Algonquin name of Chabogama or Shabogama, the channel lake in 1921, this hydronym pays tribute to Simon-Napoléon Parent (1855–1920), former mayor of the city of Québec and former premier of province of Quebec, for his entire public career.

== See also ==
- Nottaway River, a watercourse
- Rupert Bay
- James Bay
- List of lakes of Canada
