= Bell River (Quebec) =

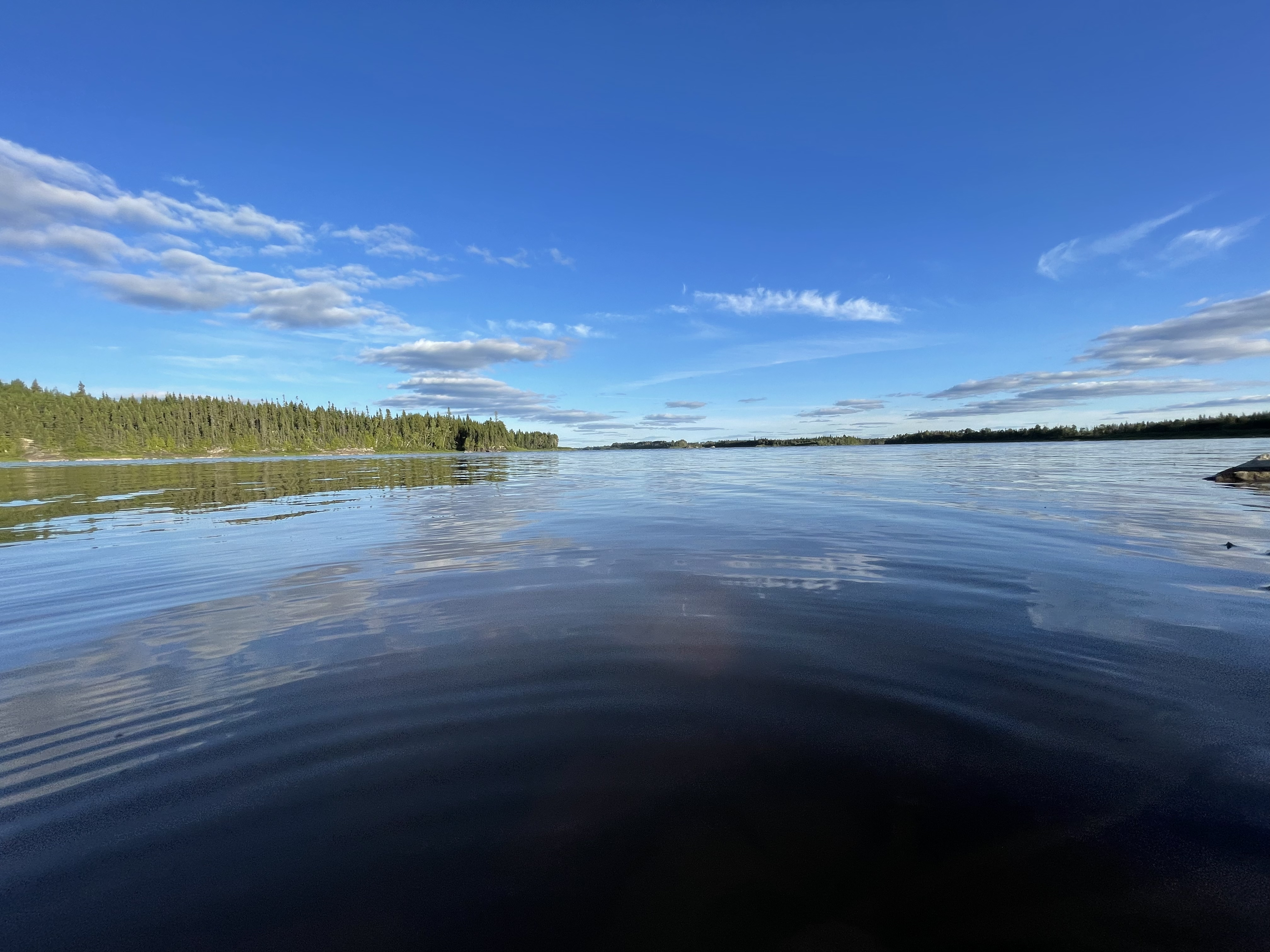

- Nottaway River's watershed

Location
- Country: Canada
- Province: Quebec
- Region: Abitibi-Temiscamingue; Nord-du-Québec

Physical characteristics
- Source: Lake Tiblemont
  - location: Senneterre, Quebec, Abitibi-Temiscamingue
  - coordinates: 48°13′59″N 77°19′15″W
  - elevation: 309 m (1,014 ft)
- Mouth: Lake Matagami, Nottaway River
  - location: Eeyou Istchee Baie-James, Nord-du-Québec
  - coordinates: 49°48′46″N 77°39′19″W
  - elevation: 0 m (0 ft)
- Length: 230 km (140 mi)
- Basin size: 22,222 km^{2} (8,580 sq mi)

The Bell River is a tributary of the south shore of Lake Matagami, which flows into the Nottaway River, a tributary of Rupert Bay. The Bell River flows into the Abitibi-Témiscamingue and Eeyou Istchee Baie-James regions in the administrative region of Nord-du-Québec, in Quebec, in Canada.

The surface of the river is generally frozen from mid-November to mid-May. The Bell River runs through the Réserve de biodiversité projetée du Lac Taibi (translation: "Lake Taibi Proposed Biodiversity Reserve"), located between the confluence of the Baptiste River and the confluence of the Indians River (Bell River).

== Geography ==
The hydrographic slopes adjacent to the Bell River are:

- North side: Lake Matagami;
- East side: Olga Lake, lake Quevillon, Delestres River;
- South side: Lake Mégiscane, Ottawa River, Lake Villebon, Lake Guéguen, Lake Tiblemont;
- Western side: Laflamme River, Allard River, Bigniba River, Daniel River.

The Bell River originates in Abitibi, at the mouth of Lake Tiblemont (length: 18.7 kilometres (11.6 mi); altitude: 309 metres (1,014 ft)). Lake Tiblemont receives its waters from the creek on the eastern side of Guillemette Creek and Valentin Creek; on the south side of the Louvicourt River; and the West of Lake Pascalis.

From the mouth of Lake Tiblemont, the Bell River runs on 230.2 kilometres (143.0 mi) in the following segments:

Upper part of the Bell River (segment of 40.3 kilometres (25.0 mi))

From the North to the CN railway bridge that spans the river at Senneterre;

- 5.2 kilometres (3.2 mi) to the North, across Lake Senneterre (altitude: 302 metres (991 ft)) to its full length;
- 1.8 kilometres (1.1 mi) to the North, crossing the "Chenal de l'Épinette";
- 21.5 kilometres (13.4 mi) to the North, crossing Lake Parent (Abitibi) (length: ; altitude: 301 metres (988 ft)). Note: Lac Parent (Abitibi) receives water from the eastern side of the Senneterre River, Mégiscane River, River Brassier, Lake Parent (Abitibi) and the Robin River. On the west side, it receives the waters from the Boucane River, Raymond Creek and Vigano Creek.

Intermediate part of the Bell River(segment of 43.3 kilometres (26.9 mi))

From Parent Lake (Abitibi), the Bell River flows over:

- 22.5 kilometres (14.0 mi) to Northwest, then North, up to the confluence of the Taschereau River (coming from the South);
- 18.0 kilometres (11.2 mi) to the North, crossing a marsh zone, up to the railway where the confluence of the Tonnancour River is situated;
- 2.8 kilometres (1.7 mi) Westward, crossing Kiask Falls, up to the confluence of the Quevillon River (coming from the Northeast);

Lower part of the Bell River (segment of 146.6 kilometres (91.1 mi))

From the confluence of the Quevillon River, the Bell River flows over:

- 2.5 kilometres (1.6 mi) westward, crossing the "Rapide des Cèdres", to the bridge of route 113;
- 22.2 kilometres (13.8 mi) to the South-West, then to the North, collecting the waters of the Laas River (coming from the Southwest) and the Kak River (from the South-West), and crossing the Rapids Stingway, Rapids Pipestone, Rapids Wakkobak and Little Kak Rapids, up to a road bridge;
- 6.9 kilometres (4.3 mi) to the North by collecting the waters of the Wedding River (coming from the East), up to the confluence of the Laflamme River (coming from the South-West);
- 6.9 kilometres (4.3 mi) to the northwest, to the bridge of a forest road;
- 24.5 kilometres (15.2 mi) to the north-west, to the Rivière Kawacebiyak (which receives the water from Bigniba River) (coming from the south-east);
- 11.0 kilometres (6.8 mi) westward through Taibi Lake formed by a widening of the river and collecting the waters of Daniel-Johnson Dam (coming from the South);
- 21.0 kilometres (13.0 mi) to the north by collecting the waters of the Indians River (Bell River) from the southwest to the railway bridge;

To the north-west by crossing the "Rapides de l'Ile" and forming a northward curve at the beginning of the segment, crossing a marsh zone (south-west side) and Passing in front of the Matagami seaplane base, as far as the Route 109 bridge across the town of Matagami;

Finally, after a long run of 230.2 kilometres (143.0 mi), the Bell River swells the waters of Matagami Lake, in the hamlet of Bell River and the town of Matagami, Quebec.

To the north of the lake, it reverted to James Bay under the name of the Nottaway River, a name that used to designate it throughout its length. The Bell, with its catchment area of 22,222 square kilometres (8,580 sq mi), is dotted with numerous rapids and large islands, Canica and Bancroft, which emerge near the mouth. The Abitibi-Jamésie Watershed Organization (OBVAJ) is responsible for the integrated management of this drainage basin drained by the Bell River.

== Toponymy ==
The Algonquins use the name "Nadowe Sibi", meaning "river of the Iroquois", to designate the Bell River.

This toponym would have been attributed by the geologist Robert Bell himself (1841–1917), when he visited this river in 1896.

The toponym "Bell River" was officially registered on 5 December 1968 by the Commission de toponymie du Québec.

== See also ==
- Nottaway River
- Megiscane River
- Rupert Bay
- James Bay
- Senneterre, Quebec (parish)
- Senneterre, Quebec
- Eeyou Istchee Baie-James, a municipality
- Jamésie, Quebec
- List of rivers of Quebec
