= Des Vents Lake =

Body of water in Quebec, Canada

- Watershed of Nottaway River

- Location within Quebec
- Location: Eeyou Istchee James Bay (municipality)
- Coordinates: 49°28′37″N 74°52′14″W
- Type: Natural
- Primary inflows: Opawica River, the outlet of two sets of lakes
- Primary outflows: Opawica River
- Basin countries: Canada
- Max. length: 15.4 kilometres (9.6 mi)
- Max. width: 6.0 kilometres (3.7 mi)
- Surface elevation: 343 metres (1,125 ft)

The Des Vents Lake (French: Lac des Vents) is a freshwater body of the southeastern portion of Eeyou Istchee James Bay (municipality), in the North-West of Quebec, in the province of Quebec, in Canada. The area of "Lac des Vents" extends in the townships of Lescure, Druillettes, Rasles and Hazeur, on the territory of the Eeyou Istchee James Bay (municipality) regional government, south of Chapais, Quebec.

Forestry is the main economic activity of the sector. Recreational tourism activities come second, notably thanks to various navigable water bodies located in the area.

The hydrographic slope of "Lac des Vents" is accessible through the forest road (east-west) R1009 serving the south-eastern part of the lake, the strip of land separating the "Lake of the Winds" and the Caopatina Lake. This road climbs north passing east of Irene Lake and west of Obatogamau Lakes.

The surface of "Lac des Vents" is generally frozen from early November to mid-May, however, safe ice circulation is generally from mid-November to mid-April.

== Geography ==
The "lac des vents" gets supplies from the East side by the Opawica River. "Lac des vents" has a length of 15.4 kilometres (9.6 mi), a maximum width of 6.0 kilometres (3.7 mi) and an altitude of 343 metres (1,125 ft).

Formed by an enlargement of the Opawica River, the "Lac des vents" is rather deformed, comprising an archipelago of islands in the North-West, numerous bays and peninsulas. This lake includes a peninsula attached to the north side of the lake and stretching on 4.1 kilometres (2.5 mi) to the southwest. The Opawica River crosses the northern part of this lake on 14.7 metres (48 ft) bypassing this peninsula by the south.

Another peninsula attached to the east bank, south of the Opawica River confluence, stretches 5.7 kilometres (3.5 mi) to the southwest of the lake, parallel to the current. An island of 3.1 kilometres (1.9 mi) is located in the Southwest part of the lake.

From the mouth, the current flows directly north to the confluence of the Irene River. This mouth of the "Lac des vents" is located at:

- 7.2 kilometres (4.5 mi) north-east of the confluence of the Opawica River (confluence with the Bras Coupé Lake (Opawica River));
- 14.9 kilometres (9.3 mi) north-east of the mouth of Bras Coupé Lake (Opawica River);
- 351.6 kilometres (218.5 mi) south-east of the mouth of the Nottaway River;
- 79.6 kilometres (49.5 mi) northwest of a bay of Gouin Reservoir;
- 57.0 kilometres (35.4 mi) south-west of downtown Chibougamau;
- 32.0 kilometres (19.9 mi) south-east of the village center of Chapais, Quebec

The main hydrographic slopes near the "Lac des Vents" are:

- North side: Eau Jaune Lake, Irene River, Obatogamau River, Obatogamau Lakes;
- East side: Rohault Lake, Poutrincourt Lake, Normandin River, Caopatina Lake;
- South side: Surprise Lake (Roy River), Caopatina Lake, Hébert Lake, Hébert River;
- West side: Doda Lake, Opawica River.

== Toponymy ==
The toponym "lac des Vents" was made official on December 5, 1968, by the Commission de toponymie du Québec, at the time of its creation.

== See also ==
- James Bay
- Nottaway River, a watercourse
- Matagami Lake, a body of water
- Waswanipi River, a watercourse
- Opawica River, a watercourse
- Doda Lake, a body of water
- Eeyou Istchee Baie-James (municipality), a municipality
- List of lakes in Canada
