= Pokotciminikew River =

Pokotciminikew
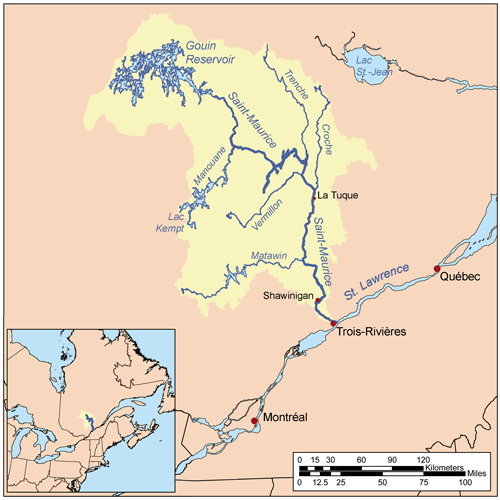
- Map of Saint-Maurice watershed.

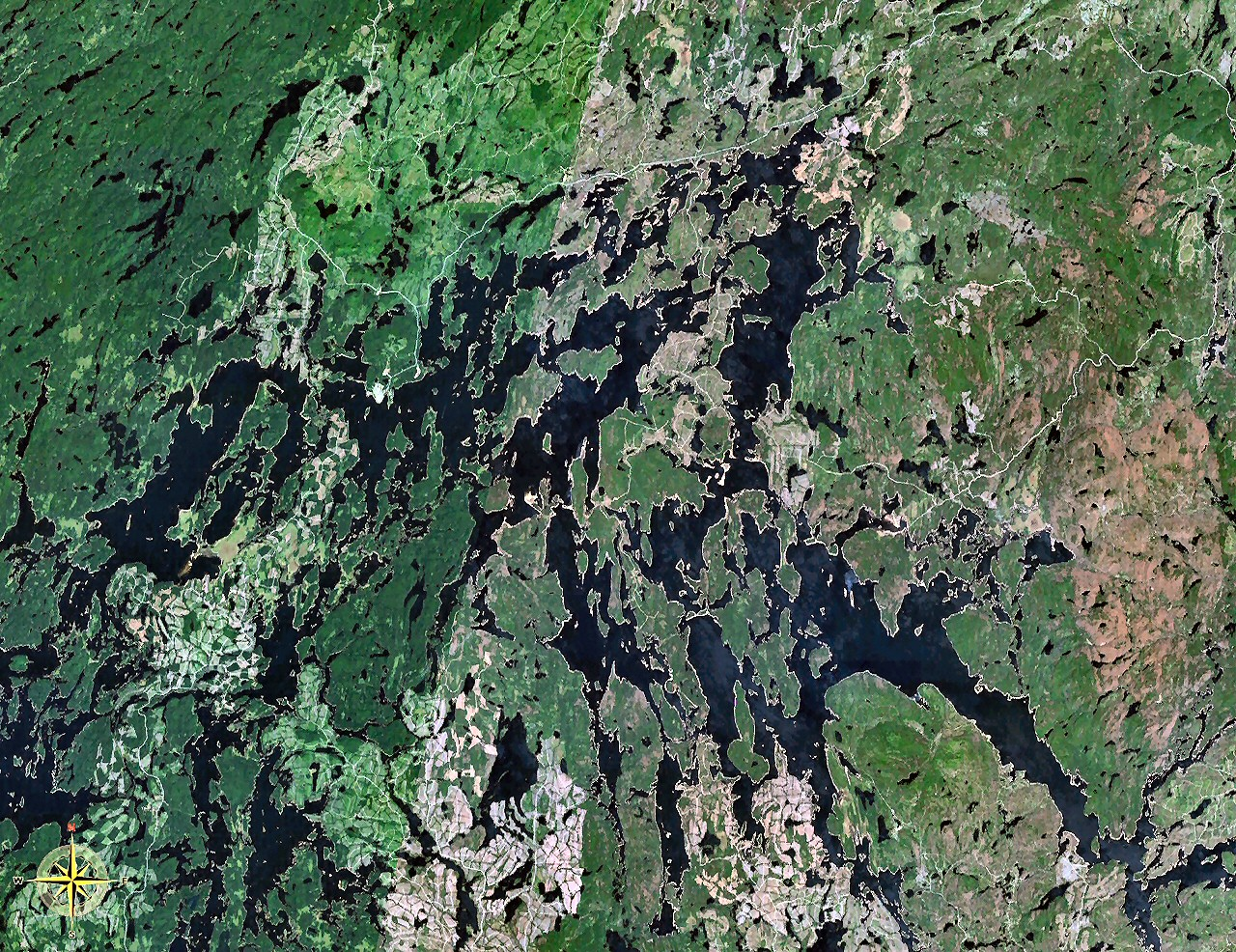
- Map of Gouin Reservoir seen from space

Location
- Country: Canada
- Province: Quebec
- Region: Mauricie

Physical characteristics
- Source: Unidentified Lake
  - location: La Tuque, Mauricie, Quebec
  - coordinates: 48°57′57″N 74°38′59″W
  - elevation: 534 m (1,752 ft)
- Mouth: Kakospictikweak River
  - location: La Tuque, Mauricie, Quebec
  - coordinates: 48°46′8″N 74°45′9″W
  - elevation: 418 m (1,371 ft)
- Length: 10.2 km (6.3 mi)

Basin features
- Tributaries
  - left: (upstream); Outlet of lake Froid; Pokotciminikew River; Wawackeciw River.
  - right: (upstream); Outlet of Lake Kasokohoteakamacik; outlet of lakes Matcimos and Kanimepiriskak.

The Pokotciminikew River is a tributary of the North Shore of the Kakospictikweak River, flowing into the territory of the town of La Tuque, in the administrative region of Mauricie, in Quebec, Canada. The course of this river successively crosses the cantons of Pfister, Balete and Mathieu.

Forestry is the main economic activity of the river valley; recreational tourism activities, second. The valley is served by a few branches of forest roads.

The surface of the Pokotciminikew River is usually frozen from mid-November to the end of April; however, safe ice circulation is generally from early December to late March.

== Geography ==
The surrounding hydrographic slopes of the Pokotciminikew River are:
- north side: Surprise Lake (Roy River), Caopatina Lake, Lake of the Winds (Opawica River), Opawica River;
- east side: Eau Claire Creek, Eastman Creek, Normandin Lake (Normandin River), Normandin River;
- south side: Kakospictikweak River, Gouin Reservoir, McSweeney Lake, Magnan Lake, Wapous River;
- west side: Kakospictikweak River, Baptiste Lake, Augusta Creek, Encounter Creek, Pascagama River, Aigle River (Doda Lake), Macho River.

The Pokotciminikew River originates at the mouth of an unidentified lake (length: 0.4 kilometres (0.25 mi), altitude: 534 metres (1,752 ft)) located in the township of Pfister, in Eeyou Istchee James Bay (municipality). The mouth of this head lake is located at:

- 8.0 kilometres (5.0 mi) north of the mouth of the Pokotciminikew River (confluence with the Kakospictikweak River);
- 22.4 kilometres (13.9 mi) north of the mouth of the Kakospictikweak River (confluence with the Gouin Reservoir);
- 40.7 kilometres (25.3 mi) north of the village center of Obedjiwan, Quebec (located on a peninsula on the north shore of Gouin Reservoir);
- 79.3 kilometres (49.3 mi) northwest of the dam at the mouth of the Gouin Reservoir (confluence with the Saint-Maurice River);
- 135 kilometres (84 mi) north-east of the village center of Wemotaci, Quebec;
- 218 kilometres (135 mi) north-west of downtown La Tuque.

From the mouth of the head lake, the course of the Pokotciminikew River flows entirely into forest area on 10.2 kilometres (6.3 mi) according to the following segments:

- 3.2 kilometres (2.0 mi) northwesterly, then southwesterly, to the eastern border of Balete. Note: this limit also corresponds to the boundary between Eeyou Istchee Baie-James (municipality) and La Tuque;
- 5.4 kilometres (3.4 mi) southwesterly to the northern limit of the township of Mathieu;
- 1.6 kilometres (0.99 mi) southwesterly to the confluence of the Pokotciminikew River with the Kakospictikweak River.

The confluence of the Pokotciminikew River with the Kakospictikweak River is located at:

- 14.6 kilometres (9.1 mi) north of the mouth of the Kakospictikweak River (confluence with the Gouin Reservoir);
- 76.0 kilometres (47.2 mi) northwest of Gouin Dam;
- 32.8 kilometres (20.4 mi) north-east of the village center of Obedjiwan, Quebec;
- 131 kilometres (81 mi) north-west of the village center of Wemotaci, Quebec;
- 217 kilometres (135 mi) north-west of downtown La Tuque;
- 327 kilometres (203 mi) northwest of the mouth of the Saint-Maurice River (confluence with the St. Lawrence River at Trois-Rivières).
The Pokotciminikew River flows into a river bend on the north shore of the Kakospictikweak River. From there, the current flows along the Kakospictikweak River southward on 19.6 kilometres (12.2 mi) to a bay on the north shore of Gouin Reservoir. From the mouth of the Kakospictikweak River, the current flows south-easterly on 84.1 kilometres (52.3 mi) through the Gouin reservoir to the southeast bypassing several islands and passing through Kikendatch Bay to the Gouin Dam. From there, the current flows along the Saint-Maurice River to Trois-Rivières, where it flows into the St. Lawrence River.

== Toponymy ==
The toponym "Rivière Pokotciminikew" was formalized on September 6, 1984 at the Commission de toponymie du Québec.

== See also ==
- Saint-Maurice River, a watercourse
- Gouin Reservoir, a body of water
- Kakospictikweak River, a watercourse
- La Tuque, a city
- List of rivers of Quebec
