= Irene Lake =

Lake in Eeyou Istchee Baie-James, Quebec, Canada

Irène Lake
- Watershed of Nottaway River

- Location within Quebec
- Location: Eeyou Istchee James Bay (municipality)
- Coordinates: 49°32′31″N 74°45′41″W
- Type: Natural
- Primary inflows: Irène River (Opawica River)
- Primary outflows: Irène River (Opawica River).
- Basin countries: Canada
- Max. length: 7.8 kilometres (4.8 mi)
- Max. width: 1.7 kilometres (1.1 mi)
- Surface elevation: 372 metres (1,220 ft)

Irene Lake is a freshwater body of the southeastern part of the Eeyou Istchee James Bay (municipality), in Jamésie, in the administrative region of Nord-du-Québec, in the province of Quebec, in Canada.

This stretch of water extends in the canton of Rasles. Forestry is the main economic activity of the sector. Recreational tourism activities come second.

The hydrographic slope of Lake Irene is accessible through the R1032 forest road (North-South direction) which passes on the west side of the lakes Gabriel and Irene; in addition, this road crosses the Irène River (Opawica River) south of Irène Lake to merge south along route 212 which passes on the south side of the Irène River, connecting Obedjiwan to La Tuque.

The surface of Irene Lake is usually frozen from early November to mid-May, however, safe ice movement is generally from mid-November to mid-April.

== Geography ==
The Irène Lake has a length of 7.8 kilometres (4.8 mi), a maximum width of 1.7 kilometres (1.1 mi) and an altitude of 372 metres (1,220 ft). This lake has dozens of islands, peninsulas and many bays.

The mouth of this lake Irene is located at the bottom of a bay north of the lake, to:

- 7.6 kilometres (4.7 mi) north-east of the mouth of the Irene River;
- 26.3 kilometres (16.3 mi) north-east of the mouth of Bras Coupé Lake (Opawica River);
- 107.5 kilometres (66.8 mi) east of the mouth of the Opawica River (confluence with the Chibougamau River), being the head of the Waswanipi River;
- 45.3 kilometres (28.1 mi) south-west of downtown Chibougamau;
- 38.6 kilometres (24.0 mi) south-east of the village centre of Chapais, Quebec;
- 152 kilometres (94 mi) west of lac Saint-Jean;
- 74.8 kilometres (46.5 mi) northwest of Gouin Reservoir;
- 104.5 kilometres (64.9 mi) north of Obedjiwan village centre;.

The main hydrographic slopes near Lake Irene are:

- north side: Eau Jaune Lake, Obatogamau River, Presqu'île Lake (Nord-du-Québec), Opémisca Lake;
- east side: Obatogamau Lakes, Obatogamau River;
- south side: Des Vents Lake (Opawica River tributary), Caopatina Lake, Roy River, Lake Surprise (Roy River);
- west side: Bras Coupé Lake (Opawica River), Yvonne River, Aigle River (Doda Lake).

== Toponymy ==
The toponym "lac Irene" was made official on December 5, 1968 by the Commission de toponymie du Québec, when it was created.

== See also ==
- James Bay
- Nottaway River, a watercourse
- Matagami Lake, a body of water
- Waswanipi River, a watercourse
- Opawica River, a watercourse
- Irène River (Opawica River), a watercourse
- Eeyou Istchee Baie-James (municipality), a municipality
- List of lakes in Canada
