= Father Lake =

Freshwater lake in Quebec, Canada

- Watershed of Nottaway River

- Location within Quebec
- Location: Eeyou Istchee James Bay (municipality)
- Coordinates: 49°18′41″N 75°28′26″W
- Type: Natural
- Primary inflows: discharge of lakes Windfall, Croft, Podeur, Rouge and Roméo, discharge of lake Skokiaan.
- Primary outflows: Doda Lake
- Basin countries: Canada (Quebec)
- Max. length: 29.6 kilometres (18.4 mi)
- Max. width: 8.4 kilometres (5.2 mi)
- Surface elevation: 338 metres (1,109 ft)

Father Lake is a freshwater body, a tributary of Doda Lake, in the southern part of Eeyou Istchee James Bay (municipality), in the administrative region of Nord-du-Québec, in the province of Quebec, in Canada. Father Lake is part of the hydrographic slopes of the Opawica River, the Waswanipi River, the Matagami Lake, the Nottaway River and the James Bay.

The area of Father Lake extends into the townships of Picquet, Royal and Du Guesclin on the territory of the Eeyou Istchee James Bay (municipality) Regional Government, southwest of Chapais, Quebec.

Forestry is the main economic activity of the sector. Recreational tourism activities come second, thanks to a navigable body of water of 64.8 kilometres (40.3 mi) length, including the Doda Lake (in the North-East) and the Françoise Lake (to the northwest). The latter is formed by an enlargement of the Opawica River and has a dam built at its mouth.

The watershed of Father Lake is accessible via the R1051 forest road from the north, serving the large peninsula that stretches east for 15 kilometres (9.3 mi). This peninsula is surrounded to the north by lake Du Guesclin and Françoise Lake; to the East and to the South by Doda Lake; Southwest, by Father Lake. The large bays of this peninsula give the shape of an F at Father Lake.

The surface of Father Lake is generally frozen from early November to mid-May, however, safe ice movement is generally from mid-November to mid-April.

== Geography ==
This lake has a length of 29.6 kilometres (18.4 mi) in the form of an inverted hook, a maximum width of 8.4 kilometres (5.2 mi) and an altitude of 338 metres (1,109 ft). Father Lake has many bays, peninsulas and islands. Father Lake is part of a group of lakes formed by Doda Lake, Françoise Lake, Stina Lake and Du Guesclin Lake.

Father Lake obtains supplies from the Southwest side of lakes Windfall, Croft, Podeur, Rouge and Roméo; Northeast, by the Skokiaan Lake outlet.

The mouth of this Father Lake is directly connected by a short strait to Doda Lake. This mouth is located at the bottom of a bay in the Northeast at:

- 12.9 kilometres (8.0 mi) South of the mouth of Doda Lake;
- 58.9 kilometres (36.6 mi) south-east of the mouth of the Opawica River (confluence with the Chibougamau River);
- 334.3 kilometres (207.7 mi) south-east of the mouth of the Nottaway River;
- 68.3 kilometres (42.4 mi) northwest of a bay of Gouin Reservoir;
- 94.3 kilometres (58.6 mi) south-west of downtown Chibougamau;
- 58.3 kilometres (36.2 mi) south-east of the village center of Waswanipi.

The main hydrographic slopes near Father Lake are:

- North side: Opawica River, Du Guesclin Lake, Françoise Lake, Obatogamau River;
- East side: Doda Lake, Opawica River, Aigle River (Opawica River), Hébert Lake, Hébert River;
- South side: Hébert Lake, Aigle River (Opawica River), Saint-Cyr River, Hébert River;
- West side: Pierrefonds River, Fortier River (Panache River tributary), Opawica River.

== Toponymy ==
"Father Lake" and "Doda Lake" were considered until the 19th century as two designated twin lakes and named as a single lake. The English term Father derives from 'Doda Sagaigan’, meaning '’father's lake’' or '’fathers lake’'. Thus, the ancient form Father's Lake has been normalized toponymically. The form "Doda Sagahaigan or Father's L." is indicated in 1900 on a map of the surveyor Henry O'Sullivan.

The toponym "lac Père" was formalized on December 5, 1968, by the Commission de toponymie du Québec when it was created.

== See also ==
- Nottaway River, a watercourse
- Lake Matagami, a body of water
- Waswanipi River, a watercourse
- Opawica River, a watercourse
- Eeyou Istchee Baie-James (municipality), a municipality
- List of lakes in Canada
