= Irene =

Irene, and related names, most often refer to:

- Irene (given name)

Irene, and related names, may also refer to:

== Places ==
=== United States ===
- Irene, South Dakota, a city
- Irene, Texas, an unincorporated community
- Irene, Illinois, an unincorporated community
- Lake Irene, a small lake in Rocky Mountain National Park, Colorado
- Lake Irene, a lake in Minnesota

=== Elsewhere ===
- Irene, Gauteng, South Africa, a village
- Irene Lake, a lake in Quebec, Canada
- Irene River (Opawica River tributary), a tributary of the Opawica River in Quebec, Canada
- Irene River (New Zealand), a river of the South Island, New Zealand
- Eirini metro station, an Athens metro station in Ano Maroussi, Greece

== Storms and hurricanes ==
- Tropical Storm Irene (1947)
- Tropical Storm Irene (1959)
- Hurricane Irene–Olivia (1971)
- Hurricane Irene (1981), part of the 1981 Atlantic hurricane season
- Hurricane Irene (1999)
- Hurricane Irene (2005)
- Hurricane Irene (2011)

== Arts and entertainment ==
=== Films and anime ===
- Irene (1926 film), an American silent film
- Irene (1940 film), an American film
- Irene (2002 film), a French film
- Irene (2009 film), a French film
- Irina Jelavić, a character in the manga and anime Assassination Classroom
- Irene Waters, the female protagonist of the 2000 comedy film Me, Myself & Irene

=== Literature ===
- Irene (play), written by Samuel Johnson between 1726 and 1749
- Irène (tragedy), a 1778 play by Voltaire
- "Irene", an 1831 poem by Edgar Allan Poe, also known as "The Sleeper"
- Irene Adler, a character in the Sherlock Holmes story "A Scandal in Bohemia"
- Destiny (Irene Adler), a Marvel Comics character
- Irène (novel), 2006, by Pierre Lemaitre
- The eponymous protagonist of Irene Iddesleigh by Amanda McKittrick Ros

=== Music ===
- Irene (musical), a 1919 Broadway musical
- Irene (singer) (born 1991), South Korean entertainer and member of the girl group Red Velvet
- Irene, a character in the opera Tamerlano by Handel
- Irene, a character in the opera Bajazet by Vivaldi
- "Irene", a song by Beach House on the 2012 album Bloom
- "Irene", a song by Mike Oldfield on the 2014 album Man on the Rocks
- "Irene", a song by tobyMac on the 2001 album Momentum

== Ships ==
- Irene (ketch), a 1907 sailing ship
- Irene (sternwheeler), a 1900s steamboat of the Puget Sound Mosquito Fleet
- Irene-class cruiser, of the German Imperial Navy
  - SMS Irene, a German protected cruiser in service from 1887 to 1921
- HMS Princess Irene
- MV Eirini, a British refrigerated cargo liner in service from 1961 to 1970
- MV Irene, a Greek-owned freighter
- MV Irene SL, a Greek-owned supertanker
- TSS Irene (1885), a steam turbine cargo vessel in service from 1885 to 1906
- SS Irene, a China Merchants Steam Navigation Company steamship, sank in 1927 by Royal Navy submarines in the Irene incident

== Other uses ==
- Irene of Athens, Byzantine empress from 797 to 802
- Irene (costume designer), American fashion designer and costume designer
- IRENE (technology), an optical method for playing sound recordings
- 14 Irene, an asteroid
- Irene, in chemistry the hydrocarbon (CH_{3})_{4}C_{10}H_{8} formed by dehydration of irone
- A rosemary cultivar
- A brand name of desipramine, a tricyclic antidepressant
- Operation Irini, a European Union Naval Operation

== See also ==
- Eirene (disambiguation)
- Irina (disambiguation)
- Irena (disambiguation)
- Iren (disambiguation)
