= Irene River (Opawica River tributary) =

Irène
- Watershed of Nottaway River

Location
- Country: Canada
- Province: Quebec
- Region: Nord-du-Québec

Physical characteristics
- Source: Trois Îles Lake
  - location: Eeyou Istchee James Bay (municipality), Nord-du-Québec, Quebec
  - coordinates: 49°31′36″N 74°37′47″W
  - elevation: 378 m (1,240 ft)
- Mouth: Opawica River
  - location: Eeyou Istchee James Bay (municipality), Nord-du-Québec, Quebec
  - coordinates: 49°32′39″N 74°50′10″W
  - elevation: 349 m (1,145 ft)
- Length: 47.8 km (29.7 mi)

Basin features
- Tributaries
  - left: (upstreams): Outlet of three unidentified lakes; outlet of Lake Dawning.

The Irene River is a tributary of the Opawica River, flowing into the Municipality of Eeyou Istchee James Bay (municipality), in Jamésie, in the administrative region of Nord-du-Québec, in Quebec, in Canada.

This river crosses successively the cantons of Fancamp and Rasles. Forestry is the main economic activity of the sector; the recreational tourism activities is second.

The southern part of the Irene River valley is served by the R1032 forest road (North-South direction) and by secondary forest roads.

The surface of the Irene River is usually frozen from early November to mid-May, however, safe ice circulation is generally from mid-November to mid-April.

== Geography ==
The surrounding hydrographic slopes of the Irene River are:
- north side: Eau Jaune Lake, Obatogamau River, Presqu'île Lake (Nord-du-Québec), Opémisca Lake;
- east side: Obatogamau Lakes;
- south side: Des Vents Lake (Opawica River), Caopatina Lake, Roy River, Surprise Lake (Roy River);
- west side: Bras Coupé Lake (Opawica River), Yvonne River, Aigle River (Doda Lake).

The Irene River originates at the mouth of Three Islands Lake (length: 1.8 kilometres (1.1 mi); elevation: 378 metres (1,240 ft)) in the township of Fancamp, in Eeyou Istchee James Bay (municipality).

This source is located at:

- 15.1 kilometres (9.4 mi) east of the mouth of the Irene River (confluence with the Opawica River);
- 30.3 kilometres (18.8 mi) in the South Bras Coupé Lake (Opawica River);
- 98.0 kilometres (60.9 mi) east of the confluence of the Opawica River and Chibougamau River, the head of the Waswanipi River;
- 352 kilometres (219 mi) southeasterly of the mouth of the Nottaway River (confluence with James Bay);
- 47.1 kilometres (29.3 mi) South of downtown Chibougamau;
- 78 kilometres (48 mi) north of a bay of Gouin Reservoir.

From the mouth of "lac des Trois Îles" (English: "lake of the Three Islands"), the Irene River flows on 47.8 kilometres (29.7 mi) according to the following segments:

Upper course of the river Irene (segment of 33.1 kilometres (20.6 mi))

- 5.6 kilometres (3.5 mi) southwesterly to the mouth of Winchester Lake (length: 2.8 kilometres (1.7 mi); altitude: 375 metres (1,230 ft)) the current flows through on 2.6 kilometres (1.6 mi);
- 3.1 kilometres (1.9 mi) west to the forest road;
- 5.0 kilometres (3.1 mi) northeasterly to the south shore of an unidentified lake;
- 6.1 kilometres (3.8 mi) southwesterly winding to the bottom of a bay of Irene Lake;
- 5.5 kilometres (3.4 mi) northerly, bypassing a peninsula westward which goes on 1.5 kilometres (0.93 mi) passing westward across Irene Lake (length: 7.8 kilometres (4.8 mi); altitude: 372 metres (1,220 ft));

Lower course of the river Irene (segment of 14.7 kilometres (9.1 mi))

- 2.9 kilometres (1.8 mi) north, up to a river bend;
- 3.8 kilometres (2.4 mi) westerly to the eastern shore of Opawika Lake;
- 2.5 kilometres (1.6 mi) southwesterly across the Opawika Lake (length: 3.1 kilometres (1.9 mi); altitude: 355 metres (1,165 ft)). Note: this lake has two parts of which the southern part receives the discharge (coming from the South) of three unidentified lakes;
- 5.5 kilometres (3.4 mi) southwesterly in a marsh zone to its mouth.

The Irene River flows on the north bank of the Opawica River; from there, it descends towards the South-West, then the North, until its confluence with the Chibougamau River; this confluence constituting the source of the Waswanipi River. The course of the latter flows westward and crosses successively the northern part of Lake Waswanipi, the Goéland Lake and Olga Lake, before discharging into Matagami Lake which is discharged at its turn in the Nottaway River, a tributary of the Rupert Bay (James Bay).

The confluence of the Irene River with the Opawica River is located at:

- 15.9 kilometres (9.9 mi) north-east of the mouth of Bras Lake Cut (Opawica River);
- 83.0 kilometres (51.6 mi) east of the mouth of the Opawica River (confluence with the Chibougamau River);
- 53.3 kilometres (33.1 mi) south-west of downtown Chibougamau;
- 27.2 kilometres (16.9 mi) South of the village center of Chapais, Quebec
- 82.3 kilometres (51.1 mi) northwest of a bay on the north shore of Gouin Reservoir.
- 339 kilometres (211 mi) southeast of the mouth of the Nottaway River.

== Toponymy ==
At various times in history, this territory has been occupied by the Attikameks, the Algonquins and the Crees. The term "Irene" is a first or last name of French origin.

The toponym "Irène River" was made official on December 5, 1968, at the Commission de toponymie du Québec, when it was created.

== See also ==
- James Bay
- Rupert Bay
- Nottaway River, a watercourse
- Matagami Lake, a body of water
- Waswanipi River, a watercourse
- Opawica River, a watercourse
- Irene Lake, a body of water
- Opawika Lake, a body of water
- Eeyou Istchee James Bay (municipality)
- List of rivers of Quebec
