= Roy River =

Roy
- Watershed of Nottaway River

Location
- Country: Canada
- Province: Quebec
- Region: Nord-du-Québec

Physical characteristics
- Source: Roy Lake
  - location: Eeyou Istchee James Bay (municipality), Nord-du-Québec, Quebec
  - coordinates: 49°07′09″N 74°36′31″W
  - elevation: 449 m (1,473 ft)
- Mouth: Caopatina Lake, Opawica River
  - location: Eeyou Istchee James Bay (municipality), Nord-du-Québec, Quebec
  - coordinates: 49°25′44″N 74°45′51″W
  - elevation: 365 m (1,198 ft)
- Length: 64.6 km (40.1 mi)

Basin features
- Tributaries
  - left: (upstreams): Outlet of lake Courny; outlet of lakes “en Flèche” and Breneuil; outlet of Lake Chaignot (via Roy Lake).

The Roy River is a tributary of Caopatina Lake, flowing into the municipality of Eeyou Istchee James Bay (municipality), in Jamésie, in the administrative region of Nord-du-Québec, in Quebec, Canada. The northern part of Caopatina Lake is crossed to the west by the Opawica River.

The Roy River crosses successively the townships of Chambalon, Pambrun and Hazeur. Forestry is the main economic activity of the sector; recreational tourism activities, second.

The Roy River Valley is served by the R1032 (North-South) forest road that passes on the east side and by secondary forest roads.

The surface of the Roy River is usually frozen from early November to mid-May, however, safe ice circulation is generally from mid-November to mid-April.

== Geography ==
The surrounding hydrographic slopes of the Roy River are:
- north side: Caopatina Lake, Opawica River;
- east side: Oriol Lake, Verchères Lake, Cawcot River, Gabriel Lake (Opawica River tributary), Rohault Lake;
- south side: Lac Roy, Toussaint River, Gouin Reservoir;
- west side: Evrey Creek, Yvonne River, Aigle River (Doda Lake), Surprise Lake (Roy River), Hébert Lake (Hébert River tributary), Doda Lake.

The Roy River begins at the mouth of Roy Lake (length: 7.0 kilometres (4.3 mi); elevation: 449 metres (1,473 ft)) in the Township of Chambalon, in Eeyou Istchee James Bay (municipality). This lake is located at 0.7 kilometres (0.43 mi) west of Cawcot Lake, which is the head lake of the Cawcot River flowing northeast.

This source is located at:

- 34.4 kilometres (21.4 mi) south-east of the mouth of the Roy River (confluence with the Caopatina Lake which is crossed by the Opawica River);
- 58.8 kilometres (36.5 mi) south-east of the mouth of Doda Lake;
- 107 kilometres (66 mi) south-east of the confluence of the Opawica River and Chibougamau River, the head of the Waswanipi River;
- 382 kilometres (237 mi) south-east of the mouth of the Nottaway River (confluence with James Bay);
- 95.3 kilometres (59.2 mi) South of downtown Chibougamau;
- 36.2 kilometres (22.5 mi) northwest of a bay on the north shore of Gouin Reservoir.

From the mouth of Roy Lake, the Roy River flows over 64.6 kilometres (40.1 mi) according to the following segments:

Upper course of the river Roy (segment of 32 kilometres (20 mi))

- 3.7 kilometres (2.3 mi) north, then west, in the canton of Chambalon to a creek (coming from the West);
- 10.4 kilometres (6.5 mi) north to the limit of Pambrun Township;
- 12.9 kilometres (8.0 mi) north in Pambrun Township to the mouth of Pambrun Lake (length: 4.0 kilometres (2.5 mi); altitude: 376 metres (1,234 ft)) that the current flows through 2.6 kilometres (1.6 mi);
- 5.0 kilometres (3.1 mi) north across the western part of Pambrun Lake (length: 4.0 kilometres (2.5 mi); altitude: 376 metres (1,234 ft));

Lower course of the river Roy (segment of 32.6 kilometres (20.3 mi))

- 4.4 kilometres (2.7 mi) to the North, crossing at the end of the segment the western part of Chrysologue Lake (length: 3.8 kilometres (2.4 mi); altitude: 373 metres (1,224 ft)) on 0.7 kilometres (0.43 mi) to its mouth;
- 5.3 kilometres (3.3 mi) to the North, by dividing the line separating the townships of Pambrun and Hazeur, and crossing the western part of Lake Verviers (length: 6.3 kilometres (3.9 mi); elevation: 373 metres (1,224 ft)), to its mouth;
- 15.8 kilometres (9.8 mi) west, then north, skirting a peninsula across the northern portion of Surprise Lake (Roy River) (length: 15.4 kilometres (9.6 mi); altitude: 372 metres (1,220 ft)) on 14.7 kilometres (9.1 mi) to its mouth;
- 7.1 kilometres (4.4 mi) north-east crossing an unidentified body of water formed by the widening of the river on 2.5 kilometres (1.6 mi) on 1.7 kilometres (1.1 mi), a second unidentified lake (elevation: 365 metres (1,198 ft)) to its mouth.

The Roy River flows on the south shore of Caopatina Lake, the eastern part of which is crossed by the Opawica River; from there, the latter generally descends towards the West, crossing, in particular, the Des Vents Lake (Opawica River tributary), the Bras Coupé Lake (Opawica River), the Doda Lake, the [Françoise Lake (Opawica River), Lichen Lake (Opawica River), then the North to its confluence with the Chibougamau River; this confluence is the source of the Waswanipi River.

The course runs westward through the northern portion of Lake Waswanipi, Goéland Lake and Olga Lake, before pouring into the Matagami Lake which in turn flows into the Nottaway River, a tributary of Rupert Bay (James Bay).

The confluence of the Roy River with the Opawica River is located at:

- 5.8 kilometres (3.6 mi) south of the mouth of Caopatina Lake;
- 10.1 kilometres (6.3 mi) south-east of the mouth of the Des Vents Lake (Opawica River tributary);
- 45.0 kilometres (28.0 mi) north-east of the mouth of Doda Lake;
- 92.0 kilometres (57.2 mi) east of the mouth of the Opawica River (confluence with the Chibougamau River), being the head of the Waswanipi River;
- 61 kilometres (38 mi) south of downtown Chibougamau;
- 40.5 kilometres (25.2 mi) south-east of the village center of Chapais, Quebec;
- 68.7 kilometres (42.7 mi) northwest of a bay on the north shore of Gouin Reservoir.
- 361 kilometres (224 mi) southeast of the mouth of the Nottaway River.

== Toponymy ==
At various times in history, this territory has been occupied by the Attikameks, the Algonquin and the Cree. The term "Roy" is a family name of French origin.

The toponym "Rivière Roy" was officialized on December 5, 1968, at the Commission de toponymie du Québec, when it was created.

== See also ==
- James Bay
- Rupert Bay
- Nottaway River, a watercourse
- Matagami Lake, a body of water
- Waswanipi River, a watercourse
- Opawica River, a watercourse
- Caopatina Lake, a body of water
- Surprise Lake, a body of water
- Lac Roy, a body of water
- Eeyou Istchee James Bay (Municipality)
- List of rivers of Quebec
