= Yvonne River =

Yvonne
- Watershed of Nottaway River

Location
- Country: Canada
- Province: Quebec
- Region: Nord-du-Québec

Physical characteristics
- Source: Lake Narcisse
  - location: Eeyou Istchee James Bay (municipality), Nord-du-Québec, Quebec
  - coordinates: 49°03′48″N 75°04′08″W
  - elevation: 411 m (1,348 ft)
- Mouth: Surprise Lake (Roy River)
  - location: Eeyou Istchee James Bay (municipality), Nord-du-Québec, Quebec
  - coordinates: 49°16′05″N 74°57′31″W
  - elevation: 372 m (1,220 ft)
- Length: 32.3 km (20.1 mi)

Basin features
- Tributaries
  - left: (upstreams): Outlet of lake Loudon; outlet of lakes Percé and Agri; outlet of Lake Tusy; outlet of lake Melesan (via lake Yvonne); Oliva creek; outlet of lake of Roches Volcaniques.

The Yvonne River is a tributary of Surprise Lake (Roy River), flowing into the Municipality of Eeyou Istchee James Bay (municipality), Jamésie, in the administrative region of Nord-du-Québec, Quebec, Canada.

The Yvonne River successively crosses the townships of Marceau, Bressani and Langloiserie. Forestry is the main activity economic sector; recreational tourism activities, second.

The Yvonne River Valley is served by the R1099 forest road (North-South direction) which passes on the west side and by some roads secondary forest managed mainly for logging.

The surface of the Yvonne River is usually frozen from early November to mid-May, however safe ice circulation is usually from mid-November to mid-April.

== Geography ==
The surrounding hydrographic slopes of the Yvonne River are:
- north side: Surprise Lake (Roy River), Des Vents Lake (Opawica River), Opawica River;
- east side: Evrey Creek, Roy River, Cawcot River, Nemégousse Lake;
- south side: Pascagama River, Toussaint River, Gouin Reservoir;
- west side: Aigle River (Doda Lake), Hébert Lake (Hébert River), Saint-Cyr River.

The Yvonne River originates at the mouth of Lake Narcissus (length: 1.6 kilometres (0.99 mi); elevation: 411 metres (1,348 ft)) in the Township of Marceau (at the southern limit of the township of Bressani and near the eastern limit of the township of L'Espinay), in Eeyou Istchee Baie-James (municipality).

This source is located at:

- 9.3 kilometres (5.8 mi) south of the mouth of Yvonne Lake;
- 24.0 kilometres (14.9 mi) south of the mouth of the Yvonne River (confluence with the Surprise Lake (Roy River);
- 50.5 kilometres (31.4 mi) south-east of the mouth of Doda Lake;
- 95.1 kilometres (59.1 mi) south-east of the confluence of the Opawica River and Chibougamau River, the head of the Waswanipi River;
- 370 kilometres (230 mi) southeasterly of the mouth of the Nottaway River (confluence with James Bay);
- 107.3 kilometres (66.7 mi) south of downtown Chibougamau;
- 46.3 kilometres (28.8 mi) northwest of the village center of Obedjiwan.

From the mouth of Lake Narcissus (the head lake), the Yvonne River flows over 32.3 kilometres (20.1 mi) according to the following segments:

Upper course of the Yvonne River (segment of 13.3 kilometres (8.3 mi))

- 8.3 kilometres (5.2 mi) towards the North-East, in the canton of Bressani, collecting the waters of the dump (coming from the East) of the Lac des Roches Volcaniques,

to the west shore of Lake Émélie;

- 1.9 kilometres (1.2 mi) to the north crossing Lake Cécile (length: 2.9 kilometres (1.8 mi); altitude: 391 metres (1,283 ft)), to its mouth;
- 1.2 kilometres (0.75 mi) northeasterly across Annette Lake (elevation: 391 metres (1,283 ft)) along its entire length to its mouth;
- 1.9 kilometres (1.2 mi) to the northwest bypassing a peninsula (advancing westward) as it crossed Lake Yvonne (length: 4.9 kilometres (3.0 mi); elevation: 391 metres (1,283 ft)), to its mouth;

Lower River Yvonne (segment of 19.0 kilometres (11.8 mi))

- 7.1 kilometres (4.4 mi) northeasterly to the confluence of Tusy Lake (from the east);
- 1.0 kilometre (0.62 mi) towards the west, to the discharge (coming from the South-West) of a set of lakes including Lake Sylvie;
- 2.1 kilometres (1.3 mi) north, to the line separating the townships of Bressani and Langloiserie;
- 2.2 kilometres (1.4 mi) north in the township of Langloiserie, to a creek (coming from the southwest) which drains five lakes;
- 6.6 kilometres (4.1 mi) north crossing through some swamp areas to its mouth.

The Yvonne River empties onto the south shore of a bay stretching south of Surprise Lake (Roy River) from 5.6 kilometres (3.5 mi). The northeastern part of this lake is crossed by the Roy River which goes north-east to the south shore of Caopatina Lake which is crossed by the Opawica River. From there, the current of this river generally descends to the West crossing in particular the Des Vents Lake (Opawica River), the Bras Coupé Lake (Opawica River), the Doda Lake, Françoise Lake (Opawica River), Lichen Lake (Opawica River), then the North to its confluence with the Chibougamau River; this confluence is the source of the Waswanipi River.

The course flows westward through the northern portion of Lake Waswanipi, Goéland Lake and Olga Lake, before pouring into the Matagami Lake which in turn flows into the Nottaway River, a tributary of Rupert Bay (James Bay).

The confluence of the Yvonne River with the Opawica River is located at:

- 17.3 kilometres (10.7 mi) south-west of the mouth of Surprise Lake (Roy River);
- 28.4 kilometres (17.6 mi) south-west of the mouth of Caopatina Lake;
- 27.3 kilometres (17.0 mi) south of the mouth of the Des Vents Lake (Opawica River);
- 37.9 kilometres (23.5 mi) north-east of the mouth of Doda Lake;
- 86.4 kilometres (53.7 mi) south-east of the mouth of the Opawica River (confluence with the Chibougamau River), the head of the Waswanipi River;
- 83.8 kilometres (52.1 mi) south-west of downtown Chibougamau;
- 57.9 kilometres (36.0 mi) south of the village center of Chapais, Quebec;
- 67.9 kilometres (42.2 mi) north of the village center of Obedjiwan (located on the north shore of Gouin Reservoir).
- 361.1 kilometres (224.4 mi) south-east of the mouth of the Nottaway River.

== Toponymy ==
At various times in history, this territory has been occupied by the Attikameks, the Algonquin and the Cree. The term "Yvonne" constitutes a name of French origin.

The toponym "Yvonne River" was formalized on July 4, 1972 at the Commission de toponymie du Québec.

== See also ==
- James Bay
- Rupert Bay
- Nottaway River, a watercourse
- Matagami Lake, a body of water
- Waswanipi River, a watercourse
- Opawica River, a watercourse
- Roy River, a watercourse
- Caopatina Lake, a body of water
- Surprise Lake, a body of water
- Eeyou Istchee James Bay (municipality)
- List of rivers of Quebec
