= Hébert Lake =

Lake in Quebec, Canada

- Watershed of Nottaway River

- Location within Quebec
- Location: Eeyou Istchee James Bay (municipality)
- Coordinates: 49°12′04″N 75°17′59″W
- Type: Natural
- Primary inflows: Hébert River
- Primary outflows: Hébert River
- Basin countries: Canada
- Max. length: 17.6 kilometres (10.9 mi)
- Max. width: 3.7 kilometres (2.3 mi)
- Surface elevation: 389 metres (1,276 ft)

Lake Hébert is a freshwater body of the southeastern part of Eeyou Istchee James Bay (Municipality), in Jamésie, in the administrative region of Nord-du-Québec, in the province of Quebec, in Canada.

The Hebert Lake straddles the townships of Machault, Royal, Belmont and L'Espinay on the territory of the Eeyou Istchee James Bay (municipality) Regional Government, southwest of Chapais, Quebec.

Forestry is the main economic activity of the sector. Recreational tourism activities come second, notably thanks to various navigable water bodies located in the area.

The hydrographic slope of Lac Hébert is accessible via the forest road R1009 (North-South direction) serving the western part of the lake and the road R1053 (East-West direction) serving the eastern part of the lake.

The surface of Lake Hébert is generally frozen from early November to mid-May, however, safe ice circulation is generally from mid-November to mid-April.

== Geography ==
Lake Hébert draws its supplies primarily from the Hébert River which originates at the mouth of an unidentified lake (elevation: 395 metres (1,296 ft)). From

this latter lake, the course of the Hébert River crosses Petit Lac Hébert (elevation: 389 metres (1,276 ft)) before it empties onto the west shore of lake Hébert. The latter has a length of 17.6 kilometres (10.9 mi), a maximum width of 3.7 kilometres (2.3 mi) and an altitude of 389 metres (1,276 ft).

The Hebert Lake which is formed in length is enclosed between the slopes of the Saint-Cyr River (Doda Lake) (West side) and the Aigle River (Doda Lake) (East side).

Lake Hébert includes:

- about fifty islands including a main island of 1.7 kilometres (1.1 mi) long in the center of the lake, at the limit of the four cantons;
- a peninsula attached to the west shore and stretching on 2.0 kilometres (1.2 mi) to the northeast, ie towards the center of the lake;
- a few bays, one of which is at the mouth of the lake northeast of the lake.

This mouth of Lake Hébert is located at:

- 9.2 kilometres (5.7 mi) South of the mouth of the Hébert River;
- 20.0 kilometres (12.4 mi) south of the mouth of Doda Lake (which is crossed by the Opawica River);
- 69.7 kilometres (43.3 mi) south-east of the mouth of the Opawica River (confluence with the Chibougamau River);
- 334 kilometres (208 mi) south-east of the mouth of the Nottaway River;
- 64.0 kilometres (39.8 mi) northwest of a bay of Gouin Reservoir;
- 95.5 kilometres (59.3 mi) south-west of downtown Chibougamau;
- 64.0 kilometres (39.8 mi) south of the village center of Chapais, Quebec.

From its mouth, the current runs directly north to the confluence of the Doda Lake which is crossed to the west by the Opawica River. The latter has a confluence with the river Chibougamau; thence the stream descends the Waswanipi River, a tributary of Matagami Lake. Then the current continues down through the Nottaway River to the south-eastern part of James Bay.

The main hydrographic slopes near "Hébert Lake" are:

- North side: Hébert River, Doda Lake, Opawica River, Father Lake (Doda Lake), Des Vents Lake (Opawica River);
- East side: Eagle River (Doda Lake), Surprise Lake (Roy River), Aigle River (Doda Lake);
- South side: Aigle River (Doda Lake), Yvonne River, Lacroix Lake;
- West side: Rouge Lake, Father Lake (Doda Lake), Pusticamica Lake, Lake Waswanipi, Wetetnagami River.

== Toponymy ==
The term "Hebert" is a family name of French origin.

The toponym "lac Hébert" was formalized on December 5, 1968, by the Commission de toponymie du Québec, when it was created.

== See also ==
- James Bay
- Nottaway River, a watercourse
- Matagami Lake, a body of water
- Waswanipi River, a watercourse
- Opawica River, a watercourse
- Doda Lake, a body of water
- Hébert River, a watercourse
- Eeyou Istchee Baie-James (municipality), a municipality
- List of lakes in Canada
