= Kakospictikweak River =

Kakospictikweak
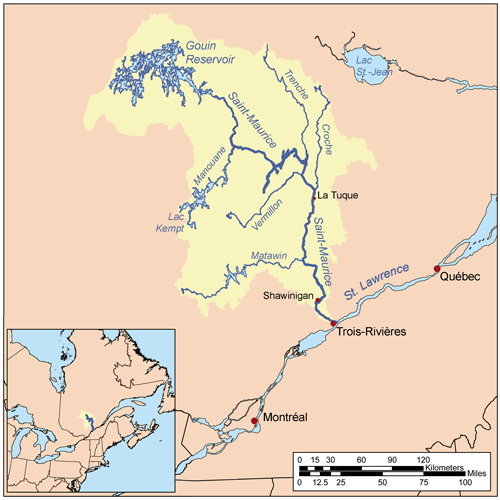
- Map of Saint-Maurice watershed.

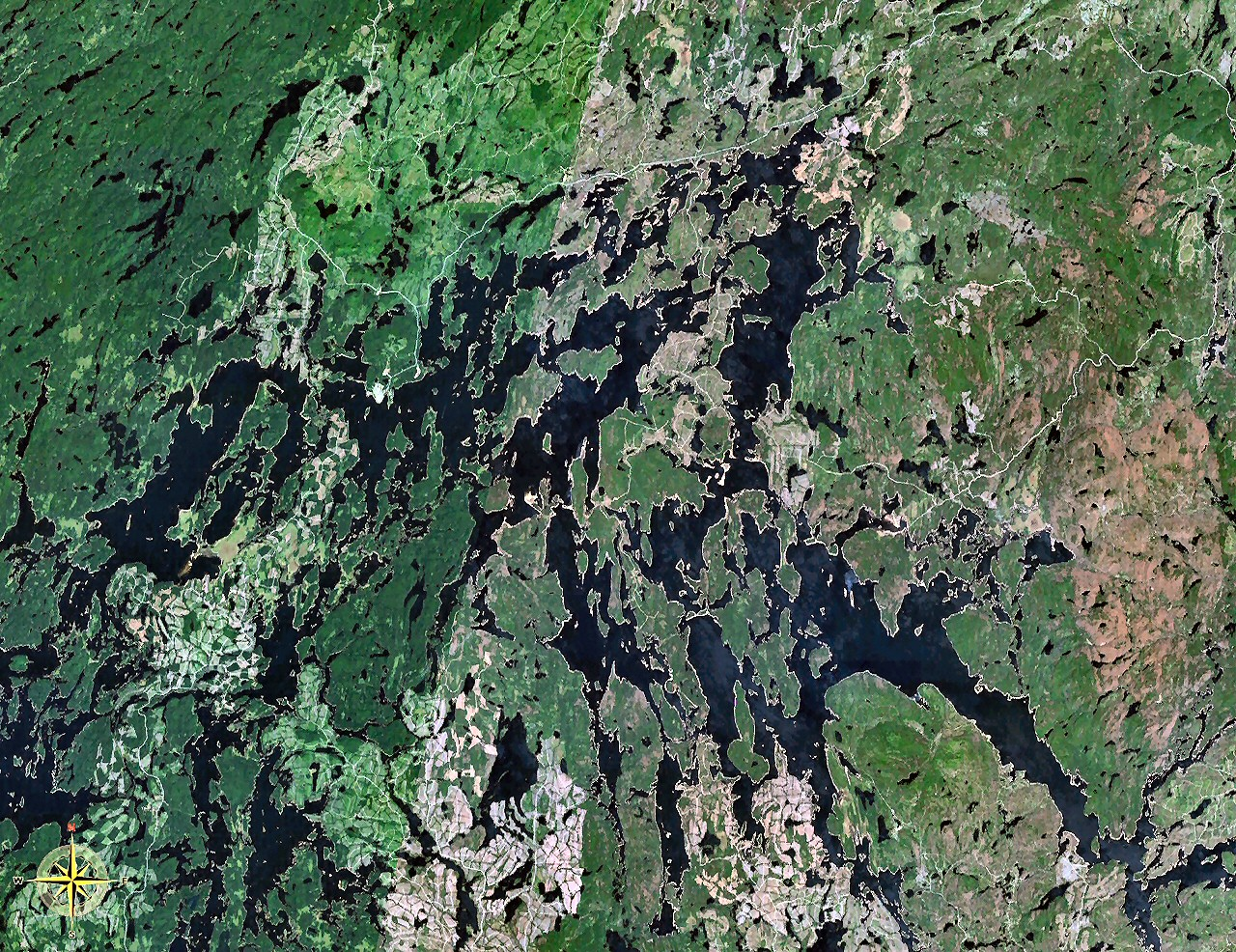
- Map of Gouin Reservoir seen from space

Location
- Country: Canada
- Province: Quebec
- Region: Nord-du-Québec and Mauricie

Physical characteristics
- Source: Unidentified Lake
  - location: Eeyou Istchee Baie-James (municipality), Nord-du-Québec, Quebec
  - coordinates: 49°02′24″N 74°38′28″W
  - elevation: 484 m (1,588 ft)
- Mouth: Gouin Reservoir
  - location: La Tuque, Mauricie, Quebec
  - coordinates: 48°46′38″N 74°45′09″W
  - elevation: 402 m (1,319 ft)
- Length: 44.4 km (27.6 mi)

Basin features
- Tributaries
  - left: (upstream); Outlet of lake Froid; Pokotciminikew River; Wawackeciw River.
  - right: (upstream); Outlet of Lake Kasokohoteakamacik; outlet of lakes Matcimos and Kanimepiriskak.

The Kakospictikweak River is a tributary of the North Shore of Gouin Reservoir, sinking in Quebec, Canada in the administrative region of Mauricie of:

- Nord-du-Québec: Eeyou Istchee Baie-James (municipality), townships of Pfister;
- Mauricie: territory of the town of La Tuque: townships of Balete and Mathieu.

The forestry is the main economic activity of this valley; recreational tourism activities, second. A forest road branch serves the valley of the Kakospictikweak River and the peninsula which stretches north on 30.1 kilometres (18.7 mi). This road branch connects to route 400 which bypasses the north-eastern part of the Gouin Reservoir; it connects the village of Parent, Quebec (via the Bazin River) and the village Wemotaci, Quebec which is located west of La Tuque. Some forest roads serve the upper part of this valley.

The surface of the Kakospictikweak River is usually frozen from mid-November to the end of April, however, safe ice circulation is generally from early December to the end of March.

== Geography ==
The surrounding hydrographic slopes of the Kakospictikweak River are:

- north side: Compton Lake, Nemegousse Lake, Cawcot River, Caopatina Lake;
- east side: Dubois Lake, Normandin Lake (Normandin River), Normandin River, Buade Lake (Normandin River);
- south side: Gouin reservoir;
- west side: Mathieu River, Toussaint River, Baptiste Lake, Larouche Lake, De La Rencontre Creek, Pascagama River.

The Kakospictikweak River originates at the mouth of an unidentified lake (length: 0.5 kilometres (0.31 mi), altitude: 484 metres (1,588 ft)) located in the township of Pfister, in Eeyou Istchee James Bay (municipality). The mouth of this head lake is located at:

- 1.1 kilometres (0.68 mi) west of a mountain peak (altitude: 549 metres (1,801 ft));
- 30.4 kilometres (18.9 mi) north of the mouth of the Kakospictikweak River (confluence with Omina Lake which is connected to Gouin Reservoir);
- 48.3 kilometres (30.0 mi) north of the village center of Obedjiwan, Quebec (located on a peninsula on the north shore of Gouin Reservoir);
- 86.1 kilometres (53.5 mi) northwest of the dam at the mouth of the Gouin Reservoir (confluence with the Saint-Maurice River);
- 141.4 kilometres (87.9 mi) north-east of the village center of Wemotaci, Quebec;
- 225.8 kilometres (140.3 mi) north-west of downtown La Tuque.

From the mouth of the head lake, the course of the Kakospictikweak River flows over 44.4 kilometres (27.6 mi) according to the following segments:

Upper course of the Kakospictikweak River (segment of 22.7 kilometres (14.1 mi))

- 0.9 kilometres (0.56 mi) north-east, crossing a small unidentified lake (altitude: 470 metres (1,540 ft)) on 0.5 kilometres (0.31 mi), up to its mouth;
- 3.1 kilometres (1.9 mi) northeasterly, then southwesterly, skirting a mountain whose summit reaches 549 metres (1,801 ft) and crossing a full length unidentified lake (length: 1.6 kilometres (0.99 mi); altitude: 454 metres (1,490 ft)), to its mouth;
- 3.7 kilometres (2.3 mi) to the South-West including crossing a full length unidentified lake (length: 1.8 kilometres (1.1 mi); altitude: 447 metres (1,467 ft)), to its mouth;
- 1.3 kilometres (0.81 mi) to the southwest, to the eastern limit of Balete. Note: This limit also corresponds to the boundary between the town of La Tuque and Eeyou Istchee Baie-James (municipality);
- 5.1 kilometres (3.2 mi) southwesterly in Balete Township, including crossing Wawackeciw Lake (length: 4.1 kilometres (2.5 mi); altitude: 441 metres (1,447 ft)) on 2.3 kilometres (1.4 mi), to its mouth;
- 8.6 kilometres (5.3 mi) southerly passing on the east side of Baptiste Lake and crossing Piresiw Lake (length: 1.8 kilometres (1.1 mi); altitude: 414 metres (1,358 ft)), until its confluence which corresponds to the limit of the cantons of Balete and Mathieu. Note: Piresiw Lake receives the Kanimepiriskak Lake outlet on the west side;

Lower course of the Kakospictikweak River (segment of 21.7 kilometres (13.5 mi))

- 2.1 kilometres (1.3 mi) southeasterly by cutting a forest road to the confluence (from the north) of the Pokotciminikew River which drains five mountain lakes upstream;
- 7.3 kilometres (4.5 mi) southerly collecting the outlet of Kikikwapiskok Lake to the north shore of Kaatcipekinikatek Lake;
- 4.0 kilometres (2.5 mi) southerly across Kaatcipekinikatek Lake (elevation: 406 metres (1,332 ft)) along its entire length to the northern boundary of Mathieu Township. Note: this lake receives on the east side the discharge of the "Froid lake";
- 7.3 kilometres (4.5 mi) southwesterly, crossing over the 0.5 kilometres (0.31 mi) Natowew Lake (length: 1.4 kilometres (0.87 mi); altitude: 405 metres (1,329 ft)) to the road bridge of route 212 in the Seskatciwan Zone;
- 1.0 kilometre (0.62 mi) south forming a hook to the east, to the confluence of the Kakospictikweak River with the Gouin Reservoir.

The confluence of the Kakospictikweak River with the Gouin Reservoir is located at:

- 67.5 kilometres (41.9 mi) northwest of Gouin Dam;
- 19.6 kilometres (12.2 mi) north-east of the village center of Obedjiwan, Quebec;
- 122.3 kilometres (76.0 mi) northwest of the village center of Wemotaci, Quebec;
- 209 kilometres (130 mi) north-west of downtown La Tuque;
- 317 kilometres (197 mi) northwest of the mouth of the Saint-Maurice River (confluence with the St. Lawrence River at Trois-Rivières).

The Kakospictikweak River flows into the Township of Mathieu at the bottom of a bay stretching over 5.8 kilometres (3.6 mi), e.g. the Northern part of Omina Lake on the north shore of the [[Gouin Reservoir]]; this bay is barred on the east side by a peninsula stretching southward on 5.6 kilometres (3.5 mi) and on the west side by an advanced land to a strait separating it from a large deformed island with a length of 22.9 kilometres (14.2 mi). From the mouth of this bay, the current flows south-easterly across the Gouin reservoir to the southeast, skirting several islands and passing through the Kikendatch Bay, up to the Gouin dam. From there, the current flows along the Saint-Maurice River to Trois-Rivières, where it flows into the St. Lawrence River.

== Toponymy ==
The toponym "Rivière Kakospictikweak" was formalized on September 6, 1984 at the Commission de toponymie du Québec.

== See also ==
- Saint-Maurice River
- Gouin Reservoir, a body of water
- Pokotciminikew River, a water course
- Wawackeciw River, a water course
- Eeyou Istchee James Bay (Municipality)
- La Tuque, a city
- List of rivers of Quebec
