= Bras Coupé Lake =

Lake in Quebec, Canada

- Watershed of Nottaway River

- Location within Quebec
- Location: Eeyou Istchee James Bay (municipality)
- Coordinates: 49°33′40″N 75°56′38″W
- Type: Natural
- Primary inflows: Opawica River, outlet of lac Le Gantier, outlet of lake Bernard, outlet of lake Denning, outlet of lake Lescure, outlet of lake Sébastien.
- Primary outflows: Opawica River
- Basin countries: Canada
- Max. length: 22.3 kilometres (13.9 mi)
- Max. width: 3.3 kilometres (2.1 mi)
- Surface area: 22 kilometres (14 mi)
- Surface elevation: 343 metres (1,125 ft)

The Bras Coupé Lake (French: Lac du Bras Coupé) is a freshwater body of the southern part of Eeyou Istchee James Bay (municipality), in the administrative region of Nord-du-Québec, in the province of Quebec, in Canada. The area of Bras Coupé Lake extends entirely into the townships of Lescure, in the territory of the Eeyou Istchee James Bay (municipality) regional government, south of Chapais, Quebec.

Forestry is the main economic activity of the sector. Recreational tourism activities come second, thanks to a navigable body of water with a length of 22.3 kilometres (13.9 mi) (the full length of the lake).

The hydrographic slope of the "Lake du Bras Coupé" is accessible through the forest road (East-West direction) serving the southern part of the Lake and along the north side the boundary of the townships of Lescure and Druillettes.

The surface of Bras Coupé Lake is generally frozen from early November to mid-May, however, safe ice circulation is generally from mid-November to mid-April.

== Geography ==
Formed by an enlargement of the Opawica River, the "Bras Coupé Lake" is shaped like a horseshoe open to the Southwest (the top of the inverted U is leaning eastward); this lake includes a peninsula attached to the south side of the lake and stretching on 8.6 kilometres (5.3 mi) to the north-east.

In parallel on the South-East side, a peninsula stretching out on the South-West bounds the eastern arm of the Lac du Bras Coupé and the Lac de la Baie. Another peninsula stretching south-west parallel to the previous peninsula on 4.4 kilometres (2.7 mi) from the north-east delimits the Bay Lake and Rane.

Finally, a fourth peninsula stretches north-east on the Rane Lake and a segment of the Opawica River that receives the waters of Lake des Vents.

The "Bras Coupé Lake" has a length of 22.3 kilometres (13.9 mi), a maximum width of 3.3 kilometres (2.1 mi) and an altitude of 343 metres (1,125 ft). The current of the [Opawica River] flows through this lake on 20.3 metres (67 ft), almost its full length. Bras Coupé Lake has many bays, peninsulas and islands. The Opawica River crosses this set of water bodies, the main ones being "Du Bras Coupé Lake", Bay Lake, Rane Lake, Lac des Vents, the Irene Lake, Caopatina Lake and its tributary, the Surprise Lake.

Lake Du Bras Coupé gets its supply on the north-west side by the Denning Lake outlet and Lescure Lake outlet; to the northeast by the Lac Gantier outlet and the Lac Sébastien outlet; to the south, by the outlet of Lake Bernard.

The mouth of this "Lake Arm Cut" is located southwest of the lake. From there, the current of the Opawica River flows South-west over 10.9 kilometres (6.8 mi) to the eastern shore of Doda Lake. This mouth is located at:

- 70.3 kilometres (43.7 mi) south-east of the mouth of the Opawica River (confluence with the Chibougamau River);
- 348 kilometres (216 mi) south-east of the mouth of the Nottaway River;
- 74.7 kilometres (46.4 mi) northwest of a bay of Gouin Reservoir;
- 59.8 kilometres (37.2 mi) south-west of downtown Chibougamau;
- 86.0 kilometres (53.4 mi) east of village center of Waswanipi

The main hydrographic slopes near Bras Coupé Lake are:

- North side: Obatogamau River, Irene River;
- East side: Lake Irene, Obatogamau Lakes, Opawica River, Lac des Vents, Lac La Dauversière;
- South side: Lake of the Winds, Caopatina Lake, Surprise Lake;
- West side: Doda Lake, Françoise Lake (Opawica River), Opawica River.

== Toponymy ==
This hydronym was formalized in 1935 by the Quebec Geography Committee. This name reflects the particular shape of this river arm intersected by four large peninsulas downstream of the Lac des Vents.

The toponym "Lac Du Bras Coupé" was formalized on December 5, 1968, by the Commission de toponymie du Québec, when it was created.

== See also ==
- Nottaway River, a watercourse
- Lake Matagami, a body of water
- Waswanipi River, a watercourse
- Opawica River, a watercourse
- Doda Lake, a body of water
- Eeyou Istchee Baie-James (municipality), a municipality
- List of lakes in Canada
