= Toussaint River =

Toussaint River Rivière Toussaint
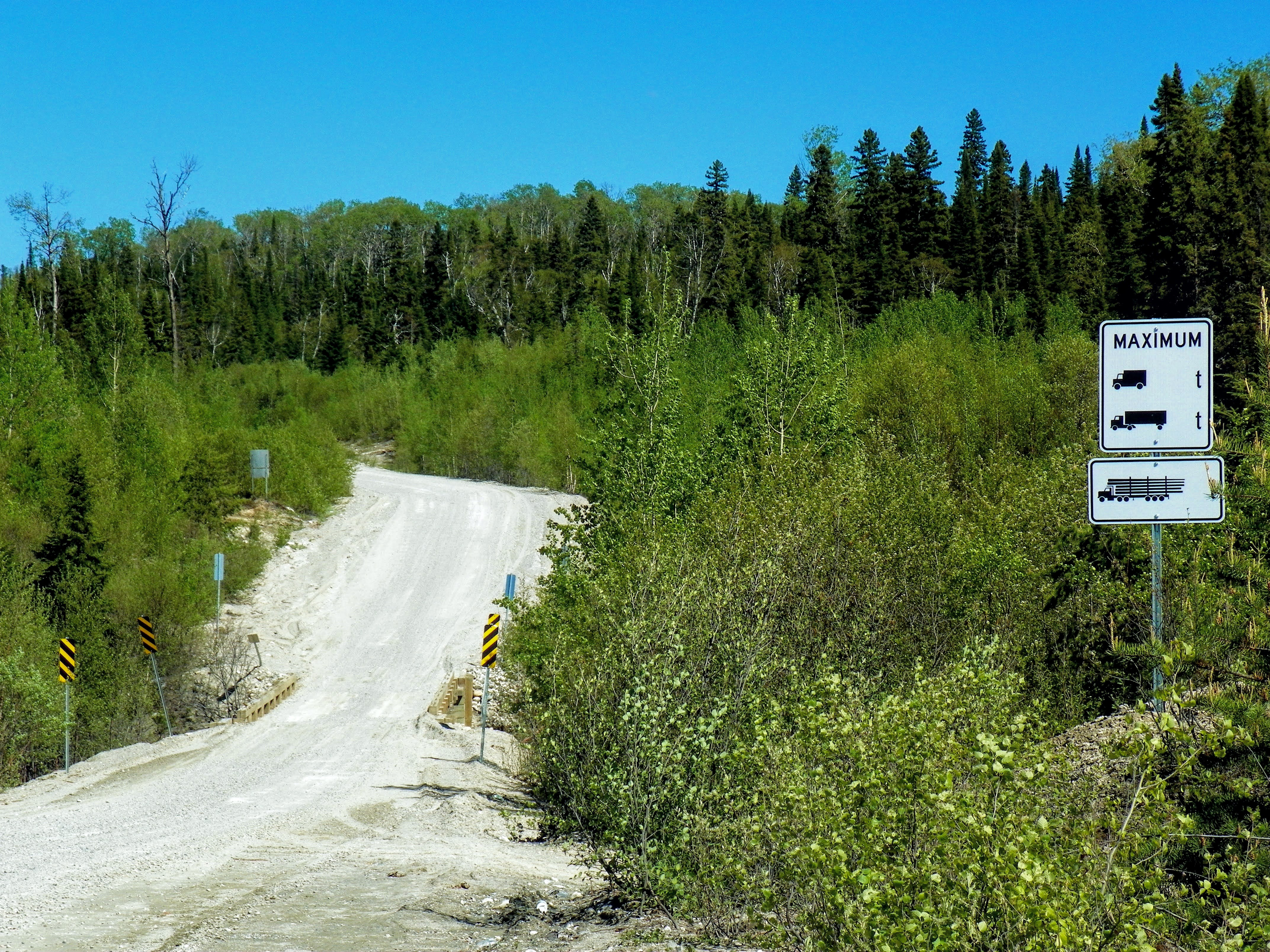
- Bridge over the river near Obedjiwan.

Location
- Country: Canada
- Province: Quebec
- Region: Nord-du-Québec and Mauricie

Physical characteristics
- Source: Coutras Lake
  - location: Eeyou Istchee Baie-James (municipality), Nord-du-Québec, Quebec
  - coordinates: 49°04′52″N 74°50′39″W
  - elevation: 480 m (1,570 ft)
- Mouth: Gouin Reservoir (via Kamitcikamak Lake)
  - location: La Tuque, Mauricie, Quebec
  - coordinates: 48°42′04″N 74°57′07″W
  - elevation: 402 m (1,319 ft)
- Length: 56.0 km (34.8 mi)

Basin features
- Tributaries
  - left: (upstream); Outlet of lake de la Mule; outlet of lake Basac.
  - right: (upstream); Outlet of a set of lakes such the “Lake du Visiteur”; Augusta Creek; outlet of Lake Roncé (via the Lake Lingen).

The Toussaint River is a tributary of the north shore of the Gouin Reservoir, flowing in Quebec, in Canada in the administrative region of:

- Nord-du-Québec: Eeyou Istchee Baie-James (municipality), townships of Chambalon and Balete;
- Mauricie: territory of the town of La Tuque: townships of Balete, Marceau, Perrier and Toussaint.

The forestry is the main economic activity of this valley; recreational tourism activities, second.

The route 212 serves the village of Obedjiwan, Quebec which is located on a peninsula on the north shore of Gouin Reservoir. This road stretches north-east along the north shore of the Gouin Reservoir to a road curve located between Dubois Lake and Normandin Lake (Normandin River); then branches south-east to serve the east side of the Gouin Reservoir, and thus links La Tuque via the village of Wemotaci, Quebec. Some branches of forest roads serve the upper part of the valley of the Toussaint River.

The surface of the Toussaint River is usually frozen from mid-November to the end of April, however, safe ice circulation is generally from early December to late March.

== Geography ==
The hydrographic slopes adjacent to the Toussaint River are:
- north side: Surprise Lake (Roy River), Caopatina Lake, Des Vents Lake (Opawica River), Opawica River;
- east side: Kakospictikweak River, Kanatakompeak Bay, Gouin Reservoir, McSweeney Lake, Magnan Lake, Wapous River;
- south side: Kamitcikamak Lake, Gouin Reservoir, Du Mâle Lake (Gouin Reservoir), Nemio River, Bureau Lake;
- west side: De la Rencontre Creek, Du Mâle Lake (Gouin Reservoir), Plamondon Creek (Gouin Reservoir), Pascagama River, Saint-Cyr Lake (Saint-Cyr River South), Macho River.

The Toussaint River originates at the mouth of Coutras Lake (length: 1.1 kilometres (0.68 mi), altitude: 480 metres (1,570 ft)) located in the canton of Chambalon. The mouth of this head lake is located at:

- 41.6 kilometres (25.8 mi) north of the mouth of the Toussaint River (confluence with a bay of Gouin Reservoir);
- 47.7 kilometres (29.6 mi) north of the village center of Obedjiwan, Quebec (located on a peninsula on the north shore of Gouin Reservoir);
- 97.7 kilometres (60.7 mi) northwest of the dam at the mouth of the Gouin Reservoir (confluence with the Saint-Maurice River);
- 152.5 kilometres (94.8 mi) north-east of the village center of Wemotaci, Quebec;
- 212.8 kilometres (132.2 mi) northwest of downtown La Tuque.

From the mouth of Coudras Lake, the course of the Toussaint River flows over 56.0 kilometres (34.8 mi) according to the following segments:

Upper course of Toussaint River (segment of 28.6 kilometres (17.8 mi))

- 2.3 kilometres (1.4 mi) north-east, crossing a small unidentified lake (altitude: 468 metres (1,535 ft)) on 0.5 kilometres (0.31 mi), up to its mouth;
- 6.6 kilometres (4.1 mi) south-east across Lingen Lake at 2.1 kilometres (1.3 mi) (length: 2.9 kilometres (1.8 mi); altitude: 433 metres (1,421 ft) to the mouth of Lake Lingen. Note: This lake straddles the canton of Chambalon and Balete;
- 6.9 kilometres (4.3 mi) south-east in Balete Township crossing over Balete Lake at 4.2 kilometres (2.6 mi) (length: 5.4 kilometres (3.4 mi); 428 metres (1,404 ft)), to the northern limit of the town of La Tuque;
- 0.7 kilometres (0.43 mi) southeasterly across a 2.6 kilometres (1.6 mi) a lake formed by the widening of the river to its mouth;
- 6.2 kilometres (3.9 mi) to the southwest by collecting Augusta Creek (coming from the north) at the beginning of the segment and crossing a lake formed by the widening of the river to the eastern limit of the township of Marceau;
- 5.6 kilometres (3.5 mi) southwesterly in the township of Marceau, to the northern limit of the township of Perrier;

Lower course of Toussaint River (segment of 27.4 kilometres (17.0 mi))

- 6.0 kilometres (3.7 mi) in Perrier Township including crossing Perrier Lake (length: 4.6 kilometres (2.9 mi); altitude: 413 metres (1,355 ft)) over the full length, to its mouth;
- 13.5 kilometres (8.4 mi) south, getting from Ouest the water from Lake Kamatcimiskowok and forming a hook on 2.2 kilometres (1.4 mi) to the east, then crossing two lakes, to the northern limit of the township of Toussaint;
- 5.9 kilometres (3.7 mi) southerly in the township of Toussaint across Lake Gaudet (length:3.6 kilometres (2.2 mi); altitude: 405 metres (1,329 ft)) on its full length to its mouth. Note: The pass Kaopitciwok is located at the northern part of Lake Gaudet which receives the water from the outlet (from North-East) of lake Aciminik;
- 2.0 kilometres (1.2 mi) towards the South cutting forested road R2046, until the confluence of the Toussaint River with the Kamitcikamak Lake which constitutes an extension on the North shore of the Gouin Reservoir.

The confluence of the "Toussaint River" with the Kamitcikamak Lake is located at:

- 69.9 kilometres (43.4 mi) northwest of Gouin Dam;
- 6.2 kilometres (3.9 mi) north-east of the village center of Obedjiwan, Quebec;
- 116.5 kilometres (72.4 mi) northwest of the village center of Wemotaci, Quebec;
- 208.1 kilometres (129.3 mi) north-west of downtown La Tuque;
- 308.1 kilometres (191.4 mi) northwest of the mouth of the Saint-Maurice River (confluence with the St. Lawrence River at Trois-Rivières).
The Toussaint River flows into the bottom of a bay of Kamitcikamak Lake which extends over 4.1 kilometres (2.5 mi) on the north shore of Gouin Reservoir; this lake is barred on the east side by a peninsula stretching southward on 8.0 kilometres (5.0 mi), from the north shore of the Gouin Reservoir. From the mouth of this lake, the current flows south-easterly on 96.1 kilometres (59.7 mi) skirting the village of Obedjiwan, Quebec and crossing the Gouin Reservoir including Kikendatch Bay] to the Gouin Dam. From there, the current flows along the Saint-Maurice River to Trois-Rivières, where it flows into the St. Lawrence River.

== Toponymy ==
Formerly, this watercourse was designated "Baptiste River" and "rivière de la Rencontre" (English: "river of Encounter").

The toponym "Toussaint River" was formalized on December 5, 1968 at the Commission de toponymie du Québec, at the creation of this commission.

== See also ==
- Saint-Maurice River
- Gouin Reservoir, a body of water
- Obedjiwan, Quebec, a village
- Eeyou Istchee James Bay (municipality)
- La Tuque, a city
- List of rivers of Quebec
