= Eirene =

Eirene may refer to:

- Eirene (artist), 1st-century Greek artist
- Eirene (daughter of Poseidon), in Greek mythology
- Eirene (cnidarian), a genus of hydrozoans in the family Eirenidae
- Eirene (goddess), the Greek personification of peace
- Eirene (moon), a moon of Jupiter
- Eirene (Rome character)
- Eirene of Montferrat, Byzantine Empress consort
- Eirene Mort (1879–1977), Australian artist and writer
- Eirene White, Baroness White, (1909–1999), British politician

== See also ==
- Irene (disambiguation)
