= Hébert River =

Hébert
- Watershed of Nottaway River

Location
- Country: Canada
- Province: Quebec
- Region: Nord-du-Québec

Physical characteristics
- Source: Unidentified lake
  - location: Eeyou Istchee James Bay (municipality), Nord-du-Québec, Quebec
  - coordinates: 49°04′17″N 76°23′28″W
  - elevation: 409 m (1,342 ft)
- Mouth: Doda Lake
  - location: Eeyou Istchee James Bay (municipality), Nord-du-Québec, Quebec
  - coordinates: 49°21′27″N 75°12′52″W
  - elevation: 338 m (1,109 ft)
- Length: 44.0 km (27.3 mi)

Basin features
- Tributaries
  - right: Outlet of lakes André and Machault.

The Hebert River is a tributary of Doda Lake, flowing into the municipality of Eeyou Istchee James Bay (municipality), in Jamésie, in the administrative region of Nord-du-Québec, Quebec, Canada.

The Hebert River flows entirely into the townships of Belmont, Royal, Espinay, Machault and Gradis. Forestry is the main economic activity of the sector; recreational tourism activities, second.

The Hébert River valley is served by the R1053 (east-west) forest road that runs north-west and north of Lac Hébert. This road joins the road R1009 (North-South direction) which passes to the East of the Eagle River (Lake Doda).

The surface of the Hebert River is usually frozen from early November to mid-May, however, safe ice circulation is generally from mid-November to mid-April.

== Geography ==
The surrounding hydrographic slopes of the Hebert River are:
- north side: Father Lake (Doda Lake), Doda Lake, Opawica River;
- east side: Eagle River (Doda Lake), Yvonne River, Évrey Creek, Roy River;
- south side: Pascagama River, Toussaint River, Gouin Reservoir;
- west side: Saint-Cyr River, Hébert Lake (Hébert River), Fortier River (Panache River tributary).

The Hebert River originates at the mouth of an unidentified lake (length: 0.6 kilometres (0.37 mi); elevation: 409 metres (1,342 ft)) south of Belmont Township, in Eeyou Istchee James Bay (municipality).

This source is located at:

- 25.4 kilometres (15.8 mi) South of the mouth of Hébert Lake (Hébert River)
- 34.3 kilometres (21.3 mi) South of the mouth of the Hébert River (confluence with the Doda Lake;
- 43.2 kilometres (26.8 mi) south-east of the mouth of Doda Lake;
- 80.2 kilometres (49.8 mi) south-east of the confluence of the Opawica River and Chibougamau River, the head of the Waswanipi River;
- 352 kilometres (219 mi) southeasterly of the mouth of the Nottaway River (confluence with James Bay);
- 120.1 kilometres (74.6 mi) south-west of downtown Chibougamau;
- 56.0 kilometres (34.8 mi) northwest of the village center of Obedjiwan.

From the mouth of Lake Hébert, the Hébert River flows over 44.0 kilometres (27.3 mi) according to the following segments:

Upper Hébert River (segment of 30.3 kilometres (18.8 mi))

- 0.7 kilometres (0.43 mi) south, then east, to the southwest shore of an unidentified lake;
- 3.5 kilometres (2.2 mi) northeasterly, crossing an unidentified lake (elevation: 395 metres (1,296 ft)) over its full length;
- 5.2 kilometres (3.2 mi) North in the Township of Belmont, to the South Shore of Little Hébert Lake;
- 2.7 kilometres (1.7 mi) to the north crossing the Little Hébert Lake (length: 4.1 kilometres (2.5 mi); altitude: 389 metres (1,276 ft));
- 6.2 kilometres (3.9 mi) northeasterly to the west shore of Hébert Lake (Hébert River);
- 12.0 kilometres (7.5 mi) to the northeast, crossing the Hébert Lake (Hébert River) (length: 16.7 kilometres (10.4 mi); altitude: 389 metres (1,276 ft));

Lower Hébert River (segment of 13.7 kilometres (8.5 mi))

- 5.3 kilometres (3.3 mi) northeasterly to the outlet (from the south) of André and Machault lakes;
- 7.0 kilometres (4.3 mi) north, to the southern limit of Gradis Township;
- 1.4 kilometres (0.87 mi) westward across the boundary of the townships of Machault and Gradis, then north to its mouth.

The Hébert River empties onto the south shore of a bay stretching on 1.2 kilometres (0.75 mi) south of Doda Lake. The northern part of this lake is crossed to the West by the Opawica River. From there, the current of this river generally descends to the West, crossing in particular Doda Lake, Françoise Lake (Opawica River), La Ronde Lake, Lessard Lake, Lichen Lake (Opawica River), then north across Wachigabau Lake and Opawica Lake to its confluence with the Chibougamau River; this confluence is the source of the Waswanipi River.

The course flows westward through the northern portion of Lake Waswanipi, Goéland Lake and Olga Lake, before pouring into the Matagami Lake; the latter flows to its turn in the Nottaway River, a tributary of the Rupert Bay (James Bay).

== Toponymy ==
At various times in history, this territory has been occupied by the Attikameks, the Algonquins and the Crees. The term "Hebert" is a family name of French origin.

The toponym "Hébert River" was formalized on December 5, 1968, at the Commission de toponymie du Québec.

== See also ==
- James Bay
- Rupert Bay
- Nottaway River, a watercourse
- Matagami Lake, a body of water
- Waswanipi River, a watercourse
- Opawica River, a watercourse
- Roy River, a watercourse
- Doda Lake, a body of water
- Hébert Lake (Hébert River), a lake
- Little Hébert Lake, a body of water
- Eeyou Istchee James Bay (municipality)
- List of rivers of Quebec
