= Irena =

Irena may refer to:

== People ==
- Irena (name)

== Places ==
- Irena, Missouri, a village in the United States
- Irena, Subcarpathian Voivodeship, a village in south-east Poland
- Irena, Lublin Voivodeship, a town in eastern Poland, merged into nearby Dęblin in 1953

== Other uses ==
- HD 146389 (also known as WASP-38 or Irena), a star with a yellow-white hue in the northern constellation of Hercules
- International Renewable Energy Agency, an intergovernmental organisation mandated to promote adoption and use of renewable energy
- Irena (bird), a genus of passerine birds
- IRENA, the Nicaraguan Institute of Natural Resources and the Environment, now the Ministry of the Environment and Natural Resources

== See also ==
- Irene (disambiguation)
