= Little Waswanipi River =

- Watershed of Nottaway River

Location
- Country: Canada
- Province: Quebec
- Region: Nord-du-Québec

Physical characteristics
- Source: Forested creek
  - location: Eeyou Istchee James Bay (municipality), Nord-du-Québec, Quebec
  - coordinates: 49°39′08″N 76°01′24″W
  - elevation: 308 m (1,010 ft)
- Mouth: Opawica River
  - location: Eeyou Istchee James Bay (municipality), Nord-du-Québec, Quebec
  - coordinates: 49°40′56″N 75°57′46″W
  - elevation: 276 m (906 ft)
- Length: 19.9 km (12.4 mi)

The Little Waswanipi River is a tributary of the south bank of the Opawica River. It flows northeast in the municipality of Eeyou Istchee Baie-James (municipality) in the administrative region of Nord-du-Québec, in Quebec, in Canada.

The course of the "Little Waswanipi River" crosses the townships of Boyvinet and Ghent. The route 113 linking Lebel-sur-Quévillon and Chibougamau passes through the valley of the "Little Waswanipi River".

The surface of the "Little Waswanipi River" is usually frozen from early November to mid-May, however, safe ice movement is generally from mid-November to mid-April.

== Geography ==
The adjacent hydrographic slopes of the "Little Waswanipi River" are:
- north side: Waswanipi River;
- east side: Opawica River;
- south side: Opawica Lake, Bachelor River;
- west side: Lake Waswanipi, Waswanipi River.

The head zone of the "Little Waswanipi River" is located at 11.1 kilometres (6.9 mi) south of the Waswanipi River, at 9.0 kilometres (5.6 mi) at west of Opawica Lake, at 7.4 kilometres (4.6 mi) north of Bachelor Lake, 5.3 kilometres (3.3 mi) north of route 113, at 8.4 kilometres (5.2 mi) north of Bachelor Lake Village and north of the Bachelor River flowing into Lake Waswanipi.

The "Little Waswanipi River" collects several brooks and flows north-west on 19.9 kilometres (12.4 mi) by cutting the route 113 which connects the villages of Desmaraisville, Quebec and Waswanipi.

The "Little Waswanipi River" flows into the Opawica River 0.5 kilometres (0.31 mi) from the confluence of the latter with the Chibougamau River, which is the head of the Waswanipi River.

== Toponymy ==
The toponym Petite rivière Waswanipi was formalized on November 1, 1988 in Commission de toponymie du Québec.

== See also ==
- Chibougamau, a city
- Chapais, Quebec, a municipality
- Desmaraisville, Quebec, a municipality
- Lake Waswanipi, a body of water
- Opawica Lake, a body of water
- Opawica River, a watercourse
- Waswanipi River, a watercourse
- Waswanipi, a village Cree
- Eeyou Istchee Baie-James (municipality), a municipality
- Jamésie
- List of rivers of Quebec
