= Lake Irene =

Lake in the state of Minnesota, United States

- Location within Minnesota
- Location: Douglas County, Minnesota
- Coordinates: 46°3′41″N 95°18′27″W
- Type: lake

Lake Irene is a lake in Douglas County, in the U.S. state of Minnesota.

Lake Irene was named for Irene Roadruck, whose mother was honored with her own lake, Lake Miltona.

Lake Irene is home to basketball legend Luke Janushka. Janushka is the first person from Irene to lead a major city pro-am league (Scottsdale) in three point %. His father Mark Janushka was notable in the 70's for catching the counties biggest fish. Some say if it wasn't for a knee injury he would have been even more accomplished than his son.

== See also ==
- List of lakes in Minnesota
