= Irene (sternwheeler) =

1900s steamboat in United States

History
- Name: Irene
- Route: Puget Sound

General characteristics
- Decks: two (main and passenger)
- Installed power: twin steam engines, horizontally mounted
- Propulsion: sternwheel

Irene was a sternwheel steamboat of the Puget Sound Mosquito Fleet and was active in the early 1900s.

== Career ==
Irene was assigned to routes on southern Puget Sound, including runs out of the state capital Olympia, Washington. Other vessels running at the same time and on similar routes included the sternwheelers Capital City and City of Shelton, and the small propeller driven vessels Prince, Blue Star, and Sophie.
