= Françoise Lake =

Lake in Eeyou Istchee Baie-James, Quebec, Canada

- Watershed of Nottaway River

- Location within Quebec
- Location: Eeyou Istchee James Bay (municipality)
- Coordinates: 49°27′32″N 75°18′19″W
- Type: Natural
- Primary inflows: discharge of lake Stina, Opawica River
- Primary outflows: Opawica River
- Basin countries: Canada
- Max. length: 5.3 kilometres (3.3 mi)
- Max. width: 2.0 kilometres (1.2 mi)
- Surface elevation: 338 metres (1,109 ft)

Françoise Lake is a freshwater body of the southern part of Eeyou Istchee James Bay (municipality), in the administrative region of Nord-du-Québec, in the province of Quebec, in Canada. The area of Lac Françoise extends into the townships of Grandis and du Guesclin, in the territory of the Eeyou Istchee James Bay (municipality), southwest of Chapais, Quebec.

Forestry is the main economic activity of the sector. Recreational tourism activities come second with a navigable body of water of 64.8 kilometres (40.3 mi) length, including Father Lake (South); Doda Lake (Southeast). This last lake is formed by an enlargement of the Opawica River.

The hydrographic slope of Lac Francoise is accessible via the forest road R1051 coming from the North and serving the large peninsula which stretches out on the east side for 15 kilometres (9.3 mi). This peninsula is surrounded to the north by Lake Du Guesclin and Lac Françoise; to the East and to the South by Doda Lake; Southwest, by Father Lake (Doda Lake tributary).

The surface of Lac Francoise is generally frozen from early November to mid-May, however, safe ice circulation is generally from mid-November to mid-April.

== Geography ==
This lake has a length of 5.3 kilometres (3.3 mi) in the form of an inverted hook, a maximum width of 2.0 kilometres (1.2 mi) and an altitude of 338 metres (1,109 ft). Lake Françoise has several bays, peninsulas and two islands. Lac Françoise is part of a group of lakes formed by Doda Lake, Father Lake, Stina Lake and Du Guesclin Lake.

Lake Françoise supplies itself on the North side by the Stina Lake outlet and on the east by the Opawica River.

The mouth of this lake Françoise is directly connected to the West by a short strait in Lac Du Guesclin. This mouth is located at:

- 54.2 kilometres (33.7 mi) south-east of the mouth of the Opawica River (confluence with the Chibougamau River);
- 325 kilometres (202 mi) south-east of the mouth of the Nottaway River;
- 80.3 kilometres (49.9 mi) northwest of a bay of Gouin Reservoir;
- 80.2 kilometres (49.8 mi) south-west of downtown Chibougamau;
- 59.4 kilometres (36.9 mi) south-east of the village center of Waswanipi.

The main hydrographic slopes near Lac Françoise are:

- North side: Stina Lake, Obatogamau River;
- East side: Doda Lake, Opawica River, Aigle River (Opawica River), Hébert Lake, Hébert River;
- South side: Doda Lake, Father Lake, Hébert Lake, Aigle River (Opawica River), Saint-Cyr River, Hébert River;
- West side: Du Guesclin Lake, Germain Lake, Germain Creek, Lichen Lake (Opawica River), Nicobi River, Opawica River.

== Toponymy ==
The term "Françoise" is a name of French origin.

The toponym "lake Françoise" was formalized on July 15, 1970, by the Commission de toponymie du Québec when it was created.

== See also ==
- Nottaway River, a watercourse
- Matagami Lake, a body of water
- Waswanipi River, a watercourse
- Opawica River, a watercourse
- Doda Lake, a waterbody
- Eeyou Istchee Baie-James (municipality), a municipality
- List of lakes of Canada
