= Aigle River (Doda Lake) =

Des Aigles
- Watershed of Nottaway River

Location
- Country: Canada
- Province: Quebec
- Region: Nord-du-Québec

Physical characteristics
- Source: Unidentified lake
  - location: Senneterre, Abitibi-Témiscamingue, Quebec
  - coordinates: 49°04′17″N 76°23′28″W
  - elevation: 409 m (1,342 ft)
- Mouth: Doda Lake
  - location: Eeyou Istchee James Bay (municipality), Nord-du-Québec, Quebec
  - coordinates: 49°21′27″N 75°12′52″W
  - elevation: 338 m (1,109 ft)
- Length: 115.5 km (71.8 mi)

Basin features
- Tributaries
  - left: Outlet of two unidentified lakes; outlet of lakes Machault and Noël; unidentified creek; outlet of lake L'Espinay; outlet of lake Mista Atikamekwanan; unidentified creek.
  - right: Outlet of lake Horsefly; outlet of lakes Éva, Ann and Susie; unidentified creek; outlet of six unidentified lakes; unidentified creek; unidentified creek.

The Des Aigle River (French: Rivière des Aigles) is a tributary of Doda Lake, flowing in Quebec, Canada, in the administrative regions of:

- Abitibi-Témiscamingue: in Senneterre, in the townships of Kalm, Coursol, Lacroix;
- Nord-du-Québec: Eeyou Istchee Baie-James (municipality), in Jamésie, in the townships of Lacroix, Buteux, Belmont, Espinay, Machault and Gradis.

Forestry is the main economic activity of the sector; recreational tourism activities, second.

The valley of the Aigle River is served by the forest road R1053 (East-West direction) which passes on the north-west side and north of Hébert Lake. This road joins the road R1009 (North-South direction) which passes to the East of the river of Eagle.

The surface of the Eagle River is usually frozen from early November to mid-May, however, safe ice circulation is generally from mid-November to mid-April.

== Geography ==
The surrounding hydrographic slopes of the Aigle River are:

- north side: Doda Lake, Opawica River;
- east side: Yvonne River, Évrey Creek, Roy River;
- south side: Pascagama River, Gouin Reservoir, Berthelot River;
- west side: Barry Lake (Saint-Cyr River South), Macho River, Father Lake, Hébert Lake, Hébert River.

The Eagle River originates at the mouth of an unidentified lake (length: 0.5 kilometres (0.31 mi); elevation: 411 metres (1,348 ft)) in the southern part of the township. Kalm, in Eeyou Istchee James Bay (municipality).

The mouth of this small lake is located at:

- 40.6 kilometres (25.2 mi) south of the mouth of Lac Lacroix;
- 81.5 kilometres (50.6 mi) south of the mouth of the Eagle River (confluence with Doda Lake);
- 83.1 kilometres (51.6 mi) south of the mouth of Doda Lake;
- 110.4 kilometres (68.6 mi) south-east of the confluence of the Opawica River and Chibougamau River, the head of the Waswanipi River;
- 372.4 kilometres (231.4 mi) southeasterly of the mouth of the Nottaway River (confluence with James Bay);
- 111.3 kilometres (69.2 mi) east of the village center of Lebel-sur-Quévillon;
- 46.4 kilometres (28.8 mi) west of the village center of Obedjiwan.

From the mouth of the head lake, the Aigle River flows over 111.5 kilometres (69.3 mi) according to the following segments:

Upper course of the Eagle River (segment of 35.5 kilometres (22.1 mi))

- 13.3 kilometres (8.3 mi) North in the Kalm township, to the western limit of the township of Coursol;
- 16.1 kilometres (10.0 mi) north along the western boundary of the township of Coursol;
- 12.0 kilometres (7.5 mi) northeasterly across wetlands and widening in places to the southwestern shore of Lacroix Lake;
- 11.6 kilometres (7.2 mi) to the northeast, crossing the Lac Lacroix (length: 11.6 kilometres (7.2 mi); altitude: 418 metres (1,371 ft)). Note: Located in the Lacroix township, Lacroix Lake overlaps the administrative regions of Abitibi-Témiscamingue (Senneterre) and Nord-du-Québec (Eeyou Istchee Baie James (municipality));

Intermediate course of the Eagle River (segment of 23.0 kilometres (14.3 mi))

- 3.0 kilometres (1.9 mi) north-east, to the limit of the canton of Espinay;
- 10.8 kilometres (6.7 mi) north-east in Espinay Township, to the outlet (coming from the northwest) of L'Espinay Lake;
- 7.7 kilometres (4.8 mi) northeasterly to the outlet (from the south) of "Rocky Island Lake";
- 5.2 kilometres (3.2 mi) northeasterly to the southern boundary of Machault Township;
- 8.8 kilometres (5.5 mi) North in the Township of Machault, bypassing two islands on the east side to the outlet of Lakes Suzie and Ann;

Lower course of the Eagle River (segment of 23.0 kilometres (14.3 mi))

- 12.1 kilometres (7.5 mi) to the North, bypassing an island (length: 1.7 kilometres (1.1 mi)) at the beginning of the segment, then forming a curve to the East, to the southern limit of the canton of Gradis;
- 2.7 kilometres (1.7 mi) North in Gradis Township, to the Horsefly Lake Landfill (East);
- 3.8 kilometres (2.4 mi) westerly to the outlet (coming from the North) of Noël and Machault lakes;
- 2.1 kilometres (1.3 mi) to the northwest, to the outlet (coming from the west) of two lakes;
- 2.3 kilometres (1.4 mi) northeasterly to its mouth.

The Aigle River flows on the south shore of a bay stretching over 1.2 kilometres (0.75 mi) south of Doda Lake. The northern part of this lake is crossed to the West by the Opawica River. From there, the current of this river generally descends to the West, crossing in particular Doda Lake, Françoise Lake (Opawica River), La Ronde Lake, Lessard Lake, Lichen Lake (Opawica River), then north across Wachigabau Lake and Opawica Lake to its confluence with the Chibougamau River; this confluence is the source of the Waswanipi River.

The course runs westward through the northern portion of lake Waswanipi, Goéland Lake and Lake Olga, before pouring into the Matagami Lake; the latter in turn flows into the Nottaway River, a tributary of Rupert Bay (James Bay).

The confluence of the Eagle River with the Opawica River is located at:

- 9.4 kilometres (5.8 mi) east of the mouth of Doda Lake;
- 65.1 kilometres (40.5 mi) east of the mouth of the Opawica River (confluence with the Chibougamau River), being the head of the Waswanipi River;
- 79.4 kilometres (49.3 mi) south-west of downtown Chibougamau;
- 45.6 kilometres (28.3 mi) south of the village center of Chapais, Quebec;
- 86.4 kilometres (53.7 mi) north of the village center of Obedjiwan (located on the north shore of Gouin Reservoir).
- 339 kilometres (211 mi) south-east of the mouth of the Nottaway River.

== Toponymy ==
At various times in history, this territory has been occupied by the Attikameks, the Algonquins and the Crees. This hydronym refers to a large diurnal rapacious bird with hooked bill and powerful greenhouses.

The toponym "Eagle River" was formalized on December 5, 1968, at the Commission de toponymie du Québec.

== See also ==
- James Bay
- Rupert Bay
- Nottaway River, a watercourse
- Matagami Lake, a body of water
- Waswanipi River, a watercourse
- Opawica River, a watercourse
- Doda Lake, a body of water
- Lacroix Lake, a body of water
- Senneterre, a city
- Eeyou Istchee James Bay (municipality)
- List of rivers of Quebec
