= Surprise Lake (Roy River) =

Lake in Quebec, Canada

- Watershed of Nottaway River

- Location within Quebec
- Location: Eeyou Istchee James Bay (municipality)
- Coordinates: 49°20′38″N 74°52′37″W
- Type: Natural
- Primary inflows: Roy River, Evrey stream, Yvonne River, outlet of a set of lakes including lake Phooey.
- Primary outflows: Roy River
- Basin countries: Canada
- Max. length: 15.7 kilometres (9.8 mi)
- Max. width: 8.4 kilometres (5.2 mi)
- Surface area: 55 kilometres (34 mi)
- Surface elevation: 372 metres (1,220 ft)

Surprise Lake is a freshwater body of the southeastern portion of Eeyou Istchee James Bay (municipality), in the administrative region of Nord-du-Québec, in the province of Quebec, in Canada.

The "Surprise Lake" straddles the townships of Druillettes, Langloiserie, Hazeur and Pambrun, on the territory of the Eeyou Istchee James Bay (municipality) regional government, south of Chapais, Quebec.

Forestry is the main economic activity of the sector. Recreational tourism activities come second, notably thanks to various navigable water bodies located in the area.

The hydrographic slope of "Surprise Lake" is accessible via the R1009 (North-South) and R1053 (East-West) forest roads serving the western part of the lake, the strip of land separating the Father Lake (Doda Lake) and the Surprise Lake. Route 1032 (North-South direction) serves the west side of the lake.

The surface of Surprise Lake is generally frozen from early November to mid-May, however, safe ice circulation is generally from mid-November to mid-April.

== Geography ==
Surprise Lake has an area of 55 km^{2} and an indented perimeter exceeding 80 km. This body of water has the shape of a bird's head looking towards the East, with the beak open and raised towards the North-East; the bay collecting the waters of the stream of Evrey thus constitutes the neck of the bird.

This lake contains

- many islands including a main island of 6.5 kilometres (4.0 mi) in the center of the lake;
- several peninsulas including two (respective lengths of: 2.9 kilometres (1.8 mi) and 4.1 kilometres (2.5 mi)) attached to the east shore; the course of the [Roy River] flows westward between these two peninsulas;
- many bays, many of which are accessible by narrow passes including West Bay which collects the outlet of Phooey Lake, the South Bay which collects the waters of the [Yvonne River] and the bay of Evrey Creek (South side of the lake).

Neighboring South Caopatina Lake in which it flows by rapids, the Surprise Lake is located on the route of the Roy River, tributary of the Opawica River.

Surprise Lake gets its supplies on the east side by the Opawica River. "Surprise Lake" has a length of 15.4 kilometres (9.6 mi), a maximum width of 6.0 kilometres (3.7 mi) and an altitude of 343 metres (1,125 ft). Formed by a widening of the Opawica River, the "Surprise Lake" is rather deformed, with an archipelago of islands in the northwest, numerous bays and peninsulas.

This lake includes a peninsula attached to the north side of the lake and stretching on 4.1 kilometres (2.5 mi) to the southwest. The Opawica River crosses the northern part of this lake on 14.7 metres (48 ft) bypassing the latter peninsula by the south. Another peninsula attached to the eastern shore, i.e. south of the Opawica River, stretches over 5.7 kilometres (3.5 mi) towards southwestern of the lake, either in parallel to the current. An island of 3.1 kilometres (1.9 mi) is located in the southwestern part of the lake.

From the mouth of the lake, the current flows directly north to the confluence of the Irene River. This mouth of the "Surprise Lake" is located at:

- 5.9 kilometres (3.7 mi) south of the mouth of the Roy River;
- 12.5 kilometres (7.8 mi) south of the mouth of Caopatina Lake (which is crossed by the Opawica River);
- 28.0 kilometres (17.4 mi) Southeast of the mouth of Bras Lake Cut (Opawica River)) (which is crossed by the Opawica River);
- 100.6 kilometres (62.5 mi) east of the mouth of the Opawica River (confluence with the Chibougamau River);
- 430 kilometres (270 mi) south-east of the mouth of the Nottaway River;
- 55.6 kilometres (34.5 mi) northwest of a bay of Gouin Reservoir;
- 66.3 kilometres (41.2 mi) south of downtown Chibougamau;
- 53.9 kilometres (33.5 mi) south-east of the village center of Chapais, Quebec

The main hydrographic slopes near the "Surprise Lake" are:

- North side: Opawica River, Caopatina Lake, Des Vents Lake (Opawica River), Irene River, Eau Jaune Lake, Obatogamau Lakes;
- East side: Verviers Lake, Chrysologue Lake, Proust Lake, Oriol Lake, Verchères Lake, Opawica River, Gabriel Lake (Opawica River);
- South side: Roy River, Yvonne River, Pambrun Lake;
- West side: Aigle River (Doda Lake), Hébert River, Doda Lake, Opawica River.

== Toponymy ==
This hydronym was formalized on November 18, 1935, by the Quebec Geography Commission. In 2018, the toponymy of Quebec counts 29 hydronyms named "lakes Surprise". These homonymous lakes, of various sizes and shapes, have in common that they are located in mountainous and northern regions. The origin of this toponymic designation may have been attributed to the surprise effect of the first travelers who used to ride in canoes this complex body of water to explore it as well as upstream streams.

The toponym "Lake Surprise" was made official on December 5, 1968, by the Commission de toponymie du Québec, when it was created.

== See also ==
- James Bay
- Nottaway River, a watercourse
- Matagami Lake, a body of water
- Waswanipi River, a watercourse
- Opawica River, a watercourse
- Doda Lake, a body of water
- Caopatina Lake, a body of water
- Roy River, a watercourse
- Yvonne River, a watercourse
- Eeyou Istchee Baie-James (municipality), a municipality
- List of lakes in Canada
