= Caopatina Lake =

Lake in Quebec, Canada

- Watershed of Nottaway River

- Location within Quebec
- Location: Eeyou Istchee James Bay (municipality)
- Coordinates: 49°26′52″N 74°45′54″W
- Type: Natural
- Primary inflows: Opawica River, Roy River (Opawica River), the outlet of a set of lakes
- Primary outflows: Opawica River
- Basin countries: Canada
- Max. length: 16.7 kilometres (10.4 mi)
- Surface area: 46 kilometres (29 mi)
- Surface elevation: 365 metres (1,198 ft)

Caopatina Lake is a freshwater body of the southeastern portion of Eeyou Istchee James Bay (Municipality), in Jamésie, in the administrative region of Nord-du-Québec, in the province of Quebec, in Canada.

Forestry is the main economic activity of the sector. Recreational tourism activities come second.

The hydrographic slope of Lake Caopatina is accessible through the forest road R1032 (North-South direction). The surface of Caopatina Lake is usually frozen from early November to mid-May, however, safe ice circulation is generally from mid-November to mid-April.

== Geography ==
This lake has a length of 16.7 kilometres (10.4 mi), a maximum width of 5.1 kilometres (3.2 mi) and an altitude of 365 metres (1,198 ft). Caopatina Lake has many bays, peninsulas and islands. Six narrow, long peninsulas depart from the north shore stretching southwest to the center of the lake, the longest of which is 4.6 kilometres (2.9 mi). The lake has an archipelago of islands in the Southeast. The Caopatina River (tributary of the Waswanipi River) crosses the north-eastern part of Caopatina Lake to the west.

Lake Caopatina gets its supply on the east side by the Opawica River, on the south side by the Roy River and on the west side by the discharge of a group of small lakes.

The mouth of this lake Caopatina is located at the bottom of a bay in the North-West at:

- 3.9 kilometres (2.4 mi) east of Des Vents Lake (Opawica River);
- 155.2 kilometres (96.4 mi) south-west of downtown Chibougamau;
- 34.4 kilometres (21.4 mi) south-east of the village center of Chapais, Quebec;
- 87.2 kilometres (54.2 mi) east of the village center of Waswanipi;
- 75.3 kilometres (46.8 mi) north of Gouin Reservoir;
- 170 kilometres (110 mi) north-east of Lebel-sur-Quévillon.

The main hydrographic slopes near Lake Caopatina are:

- North side: Irene River, Fancamp Lake, Chibougamau River, Chibougamau Lake;
- East side: Opawica River, Eu Lake, Nemenjiche Lake, Rohault Lake;
- South side: Roy River (Opawica River), Surprise Lake (Roy River), Cawcot River;
- West side: Des Vents Lake (Opawica River), Opawica River, Doda Lake.

== Toponymy ==
Of Innu origin or Cree, this hydronym would mean "lake between two cliffs". The name "Lac Caopatina" has been indicated on various cartographic documents since at least 1927. In the past, this body of water was designated in various toponymic forms: Kaopatina, Kaopatnaginsckao and Lac de l'Épinette Rouge.

The toponym "Lac Caopatina" was formalized on December 5, 1968, by the Commission de toponymie du Québec, when it was created.

== See also ==
- James Bay
- Nottaway River, a watercourse
- Matagami Lake, a body of water
- Waswanipi River, a watercourse
- Opawica River, a watercourse
- Roy River (Opawica River), a watercourse
- Eeyou Istchee Baie-James (municipality), a municipality
- List of lakes in Canada
