= Opawica River =

Opawica
- Watershed of Nottaway River

Location
- Country: Canada
- Province: Quebec
- Region: Nord-du-Québec

Physical characteristics
- Source: Gabriel Lake
  - location: Eeyou Istchee James Bay (municipality), Nord-du-Québec, Quebec
  - coordinates: 49°40′42″N 74°29′22″W
  - elevation: 390 m (1,280 ft)
- Mouth: Waswanipi River
  - location: Eeyou Istchee James Bay (municipality), Nord-du-Québec, Quebec
  - coordinates: 49°41′07″N 75°57′49″W
  - elevation: 280 m (920 ft)
- Length: 225.1 km (139.9 mi)

Basin features
- Tributaries
  - left: (upstream): Little Waswanipi River; Nicobi River (via Lichen Lake); Margry stream; Germain stream; La Ronde stream; Aigle River (via Doda Lake); Saint-Cyr River (via Doda Lake); Yvonne River (via Surprise Lake); Évrey stream (via Surprise Lake); Roy River (via Caopatina Lake); Cawcot River (via Gabriel Lake); Queue de Castor River (via Gabriel Lake).
  - right: (upstream): Dalime stream (via Opawica Lake); Rachel stream (via La Ronde Lake); Paul stream (via Doda Lake); Irène River.

The Opawica River is a tributary of the Waswanipi River, which is a tributary of Matagami Lake which in turn flows into the Nottaway River which flows into the south of James Bay. The Opawica River flows in the municipality of Eeyou Istchee Baie-James (municipality), in the administrative region of Nord-du-Québec, in Quebec, the Canada.

Forestry is the main economic activity of the sector. Recreational tourism activities come second, thanks to this large navigable waterway.

The northern and western portions of the Lake Opawica watershed are accessible via the forest road route 113 linking Chibougamau to Lebel-sur-Quévillon. A forest road serving the southern, eastern and northern shores of Opawica and Wachigabau lakes connects via the north to route 113. The western side of the slope is also accessible through the Canadian National Railway passing between these two lakes. The intermediate part of the slope is accessible by the forest road R1051 (coming from the North). The upper part of the river is mostly accessible by the road R1032 (coming from the South).

The surface of the Opawica River is usually frozen from early November to mid-May, however, safe ice movement is generally from mid-November to mid-April.

== Geography ==
The Opawica River originates at the mouth of Gabriel Lake (length: 8.0 kilometres (5.0 mi); elevation: 392 metres (1,286 ft)). This body of water is located at the eastern end of the Nord-du-Québec administrative region. In this sector, the watershed line on the east side of the lake corresponds approximately to the line of separation between the Le Domaine-du-Roy Regional County Municipality (RCM) and Eeyou Istchee James Bay (municipality).

The surrounding hydrographic slopes of the Opawica River are:

- north side: Chibougamau River, Obatogamau River;
- east side: Normandin River, Obatogamau Lakes, Eau Jaune Lake, Rohault Lake, Poutrincourt Lake;
- south side: Gouin Reservoir, Wetetnagami River, Mégiscane River, Mesplet Lake;
- west side: Lake Waswanipi, Waswanipi River, O'Sullivan River, Little Waswanipi River.

From the mouth of Gabriel (head lake), the river flows over 225.2 kilometres (139.9 mi) according to the following segments:

Upper course of the Opawica River (segment of 97.5 kilometres (60.6 mi)) Cantons de: De Grisafy, Gamache, Hazeur, Rasles, Lescure, Druillettes, Gradis.

- 24.8 kilometres (15.4 mi) northwesterly and crossing the "lake of Eu" (length: 2.6 kilometres (1.6 mi); elevation: 367 metres (1,204 ft)) on 2.1 kilometres (1.3 mi) to its mouth;
- 5.9 kilometres (3.7 mi) to the NW by forming 2 large curves and crossing an unidentified lake (elevation: 365 metres (1,198 ft)), to the east shore of Caopatina Lake;
- 9.5 kilometres (5.9 mi) to the northwest, crossing the Caopatina Lake (length: 16.7 kilometres (10.4 mi); elevation: 365 metres (1,198 ft)), to its mouth;
- 14.7 kilometres (9.1 mi) West, crossing the Des Vents Lake (length: 15.4 kilometres (9.6 mi); elevation: 343 metres (1,125 ft)), to its mouth;
- 8.4 kilometres (5.2 mi) towards the South-West, crossing the "Lake Rane" (length: 5.7 kilometres (3.5 mi); elevation: 345 metres (1,132 ft)) on 3.7 kilometres (2.3 mi) to its mouth;
- 3.0 kilometres (1.9 mi) southwesterly, crossing the "Bay Lake" (length: 7.4 kilometres (4.6 mi); elevation: 344 metres (1,129 ft)), to its mouth;
- 20.3 kilometres (12.6 mi) north, then south-west, across the Bras Coupé Lake (length: 21.7 kilometres (13.5 mi); elevation: 343 metres (1,125 ft)) which has the shape of a U, to its mouth;
- 10.9 kilometres (6.8 mi) southwesterly to the eastern shore of Doda Lake;

Intermediate course of the Opawica River (segment of 51.5 kilometres (32.0 mi)) Townships: De Gradis, Guesclin, Guercheville, La Ronde.

- 12.8 kilometres (8.0 mi) West, crossing the Doda Lake (length: 29.4 kilometres (18.3 mi); elevation: 338 metres (1,109 ft)) where the current bypasses the "Peninsula of the Tower" by the North;
- 8.0 kilometres (5.0 mi) northwesterly, crossing the Françoise Lake (Opawica River) (elevation: 338 metres (1,109 ft)) over its full length;
- 3.2 kilometres (2.0 mi) West, crossing Lake Du Guesclin (length: 3.2 kilometres (2.0 mi); elevation: 338 metres (1,109 ft));
- 4.4 kilometres (2.7 mi) northwesterly to the limit of the township of Guercheville;
- 11.3 kilometres (7.0 mi) westerly in the township of Guercheville, to the limit of the township of La Ronde;
- 4.4 kilometres (2.7 mi) west, then north-west, to the south shore of La Ronde Lake;
- 3.4 kilometres (2.1 mi) to the North, crossing the La Ronde Lake (length: 7.1 kilometres (4.4 mi); elevation: 312 metres (1,024 ft));
- 4.0 kilometres (2.5 mi) southwesterly to the east shore of Lessard Lake;

Lower course of the Opawica River (segment of 76.2 kilometres (47.3 mi)) Cantons: Ronde, Espérance and Ghent.

- 10.3 kilometres (6.4 mi) south-east, crossing the full length of Lake Lessard (elevation: 304 metres (997 ft)) whose shape resembles a crescent;
- 0.4 kilometres (0.25 mi) to the south, crossing falls;
- 22.6 kilometres (14.0 mi) easterly crossing the Lichen Lake (Opawica River) (length: 30.0 kilometres (18.6 mi); elevation: 302 metres (991 ft));
- 19.5 kilometres (12.1 mi) north-east across the Wachigabau Lake (length: 31.5 kilometres (19.6 mi); elevation: 302 metres (991 ft));
- 8.9 kilometres (5.5 mi) northwesterly across the Opawica Lake (length: 17.1 kilometres (10.6 mi); elevation: 301 metres (988 ft)) bypassing Gull Island;
- 7.6 kilometres (4.7 mi) northeasterly to a bridge in a river bend;
- 6.9 kilometres (4.3 mi) northwesterly to its mouth.

From the dam at the mouth of Opawica Lake, the course of the Opawica River flows over 14 kilometres (8.7 mi) first northeasterly to a bend of the river, then to the north. West to its confluence with the Chibougamau River. This confluence of these two rivers becomes the head of the Waswanipi River.

The mouth of the Opawica River is located 81 kilometres (50 mi) west of Chapais and 118 kilometres (73 mi) east of Matagami. Rapids are located 5 kilometres (3.1 mi) upstream from the mouth of the Opawica River, and 1.6 kilometres (0.99 mi) more upstream, there is the "Sturgeon Falls" where the river elbows 90 degrees, coming from the south to move west. The Little Waswanipi River empties onto the south bank of the Opawica River at 0.5 kilometres (0.31 mi) from the mouth of the Opawica River.

== Toponymy ==
The term "Opawica" is associated with the lake, the island and the river.

The toponym "Opawica River" was formalized on December 5, 1968, at the Bank of Place Names of the Commission de toponymie du Québec.

== See also ==
- Opawica Lake, a body of water
- Wachigabau Lake, a body of water
- Lichen Lake (Opawica River), a body of water
- Doda Lake, a body of water
- Surprise Lake (Roy River), a body of water
- Caopatina Lake, a body of water
- Des Vents Lake (Opawica River tributary), a body of water
- Bras Coupé Lake (Opawica River), a body of water
- Gabriel Lake (Opawica River tributary), a body of water
- Robert Lake (Opawica River tributary), a body of water
- Waswanipi River, a watercourse
- Chibougamau River, a watercourse
- Nicobi River, a watercourse
- Aigle River (Opawica River), a watercourse
- Little Waswanipi River, a watercourse
- Queue de Castor River, a watercourse
- Cawcot River, a watercourse
- Waswanipi, a village Cree
- Eeyou Istchee Baie-James (Municipality), a municipality
- James Bay
- List of rivers of Quebec
