= Doda Lake =

Lake in Quebec, Canada

- Watershed of Nottaway River

- Location within Quebec
- Location: Eeyou Istchee Baie-James (municipality)
- Coordinates: 49°24′04″N 75°11′40″W
- Primary inflows: Saint-Cyr River; Aigle River (Opawica River)
- Primary outflows: Opawica River
- Basin countries: Canada
- Max. length: 29.4 kilometres (18.3 mi)
- Max. width: 5.2 kilometres (3.2 mi)
- Surface area: 76 kilometres (47 mi)
- Surface elevation: 335 metres (1,099 ft)

Doda Lake is a freshwater body of the southern part of Eeyou Istchee James Bay (municipality), in the administrative region of Nord-du-Québec, in the province of Quebec, in Canada. Doda Lake extends into the townships of Gradis, Machault, Du Guesglin and Royal.

Forestry is the main economic activity of the sector. Recreational tourism activities come second with a navigable body of water of 64.8 kilometres (40.3 mi), including Father Lake (on southeast) and Françoise Lake (on north-west). The latter is formed by an enlargement of the Opawica River and has a dam built at its mouth.

The Doda Lake hydrographic slope is accessible via the R1051 Forest Road from the North, then branches off to the east to serve the peninsula (extending eastward on the 15 kilometres (9.3 mi) separating the Father Lake and Doda Lake.

The surface of Doda Lake is generally frozen from early December November to mid-May, however safe ice movement is generally from mid-November to mid-April.

== Geography ==
This lake has a length of 29.4 kilometres (18.3 mi) in the form of an inverted hook, a maximum width of 5.21 kilometres (3.24 mi) and an altitude of 335 metres (1,099 ft).

Lake Doda has many bays, peninsulas and islands. The Opawica River (tributary of the Waswanipi River) runs westward through the northern part of Doda Lake.

Lake Doda draws supplies from the South on the Aigle River (Opawica River) and the Saint-Cyr River.

The mouth of Lake Doda is directly connected by a short strait to Lake Francoise. This mouth is located at the bottom of a bay in the Northwest to:

- 76.4 kilometres (47.5 mi) east of Lake Waswanipi;
- 109 kilometres (68 mi) south-west of downtown Chibougamau;
- 104.6 kilometres (65.0 mi) north-east of the village center of Lebel-sur-Quévillon;
- 112.3 kilometres (69.8 mi) northwest of Gouin Reservoir.

The main hydrographic slopes near Lake Doda are:

- North side: Opawica River, Chibougamau River;
- East side: Aigle River (Opawica River), Surprise Lake (Roy River);
- South side: Aigle River (Opawica River), Saint-Cyr River, Hebert River;
- West side: Father Lake (Dora Lake), Opawica River.

== Toponymy ==
Father Lake and Doda Lake (area of 76 square kilometres (29 sq mi)) appear to be two twins, having been considered as one entity by explorers. In the past, a large forest camp has been set up on its shores, where a depot has already welcomed teams of loggers and log drivers. An outfitter is operating for recreational and tourism activities including hunting and fishing.

An 1898 map identifies Father's and Doda's lakes separately. However, explorer Henry O'Sullivan considers on his 1900 map that these two lakes form a single entity that he says "Doda Sagahaigan or Father's L". Its original name Doda Sagaigan or Doda Sagandigan of Aboriginal origin of the Algonquin Nation meant "Father's Lake" or "Fathers Lake". This name has been abbreviated for ease of use and pronunciation. It could be an allusion to the ancient presence of missionaries.

The name "Lac Doda" was officialized on December 5, 1968, by the Commission de toponymie du Québec when it was created.

== See also ==
- Nottaway River, a watercourse
- Matagami Lake, a body of water
- Waswanipi River, a watercourse
- Opawica River, a watercourse
- Aigle River (Opawica River), a watercourse
- Saint-Cyr River, a watercourse
- Eeyou Istchee Baie-James (municipality), a municipality
- List of lakes in Canada
