= Ventadour Lake (Ventadour River) =

Lake in Eeyou Istchee James Bay, Quebec, Canada

- Watershed of Nottaway River

- Location within Quebec
- Location: Eeyou Istchee James Bay (municipality)
- Coordinates: 49°01′57″N 74°24′03″W
- Type: Natural
- Primary inflows: Ventadour River; outlet of Lake Émery; outlet of Daniel Léo.
- Primary outflows: Ventadour River.
- Basin countries: Canada
- Max. length: 12.5 kilometres (7.8 mi)
- Max. width: 1.4 kilometres (0.87 mi)
- Surface elevation: 424 metres (1,391 ft)

The Ventadour Lake is a freshwater body of the southeastern portion of the Eeyou Istchee James Bay (municipality), in Jamésie, in the administrative region of Nord-du-Québec, in the province of Quebec, in Canada.

This body of water extends in the townships of Ventadour and Feuquières. Forestry is the main economic activity of the sector. Recreational tourism activities come second.

The hydrographic slope of Lake Ventadour is accessible via the forest road R1032 (North-South direction) which passes on the west side of lakes Gabriel and Ventadour; in addition, this road crosses the Ventadour River south of Ventadour Lake to merge south on route 212 which passes on the south side of the Ventadour River, connecting Obedjiwan to La Tuque.

The surface of Ventadour Lake is usually frozen from early November to mid-May, however, safe ice circulation is generally from mid-November to mid-April.

== Geography ==
Lake Ventadour has a length of 12.5 kilometres (7.8 mi), a maximum width of 1.4 kilometres (0.87 mi) and an altitude of 424 metres (1,391 ft). This long lake is an extension of the Ventadour River which also crosses Lake Nairn upstream.

Lake Ventadour is located at 4.8 kilometres (3.0 mi) west of the administrative boundaries of Saguenay-Lac-Saint-Jean and Eeyou Istchee James Bay (municipality). The mouth of this lake Ventadour is located at the bottom of a bay north of the lake, to: South of the mouth of the Ventadour River

- 29.7 kilometres (18.5 mi) south-east of the mouth of Gabriel Lake;
- 50.9 kilometres (31.6 mi) south-east of the mouth of Caopatina Lake;
- 92.2 kilometres (57.3 mi) south-east of downtown Chibougamau;
- 83.8 kilometres (52.1 mi) south-east of the village center of Chapais, Quebec;
- 153 kilometres (95 mi) west of lac Saint-Jean;
- 30.4 kilometres (18.9 mi) north of Gouin Reservoir;
- 61.2 kilometres (38.0 mi) northeast of Obedjiwan village center.

The main hydrographic slopes near Lake Ventadour are:

- North side: Robert Lake, Rohault Lake, Feuquières Lake, Gabriel Lake, Opawica River;
- East side: Normandin River, Marquette River West, Poutrincourt Lake;
- South side: Gouin reservoir, Wapous River;
- West side: Eastman Creek, Beaucours Lake, Queue de Castor River, Cawcot River, Yvonne River, Aigle River (Doda Lake), Hébert Lake (Hébert River).

== Toponymy ==
The name "Lac Ventadour" was officialized on December 5, 1968 by the Commission de toponymie du Québec, when it was created.

== See also ==
- James Bay
- Nottaway River, a watercourse
- Matagami Lake, a body of water
- Waswanipi River, a watercourse
- Opawica River, a watercourse
- Gabriel Lake (Opawica River tributary), a body of water
- Robert Lake (Opawica River tributary), a body of water
- Eeyou Istchee Baie-James (municipality), a municipality
- List of lakes in Canada
