= Ventadour =

Ventadour may refer to:

== Family name ==
- Duke of Ventadour, a noble title in the peerage of France
- Bernart de Ventadorn, a French troubadour of the 12th century
- Bernard de Ventadour, a bishop of Puy-en-Velay, France, 1251–1255
- Maria de Ventadorn, a French trobairitz from the end of the 12th century
- Guy de Ventadour, a bishop of Vabres, France, 1349–1352

== Castles ==
- Château de Ventadour, in Moustier-Ventadour, Corrèze, France
- Château de Ventadour (Ardèche), in Meyras, Ardèche, France

== Places ==
- Lake Ventadour (La Tuque), La Tuque, Mauricie, Quebec, Canada
- Ventadour Lake (Ventadour River), Jamésie, Nord-du-Québec, Québec, Canada
- Ventadour River, Eeyou Istchee Baie-James, Quebec, Canada
