= Hôtel de Ville, Lormont =

Town hall in Lormont, France

Hôtel de Ville
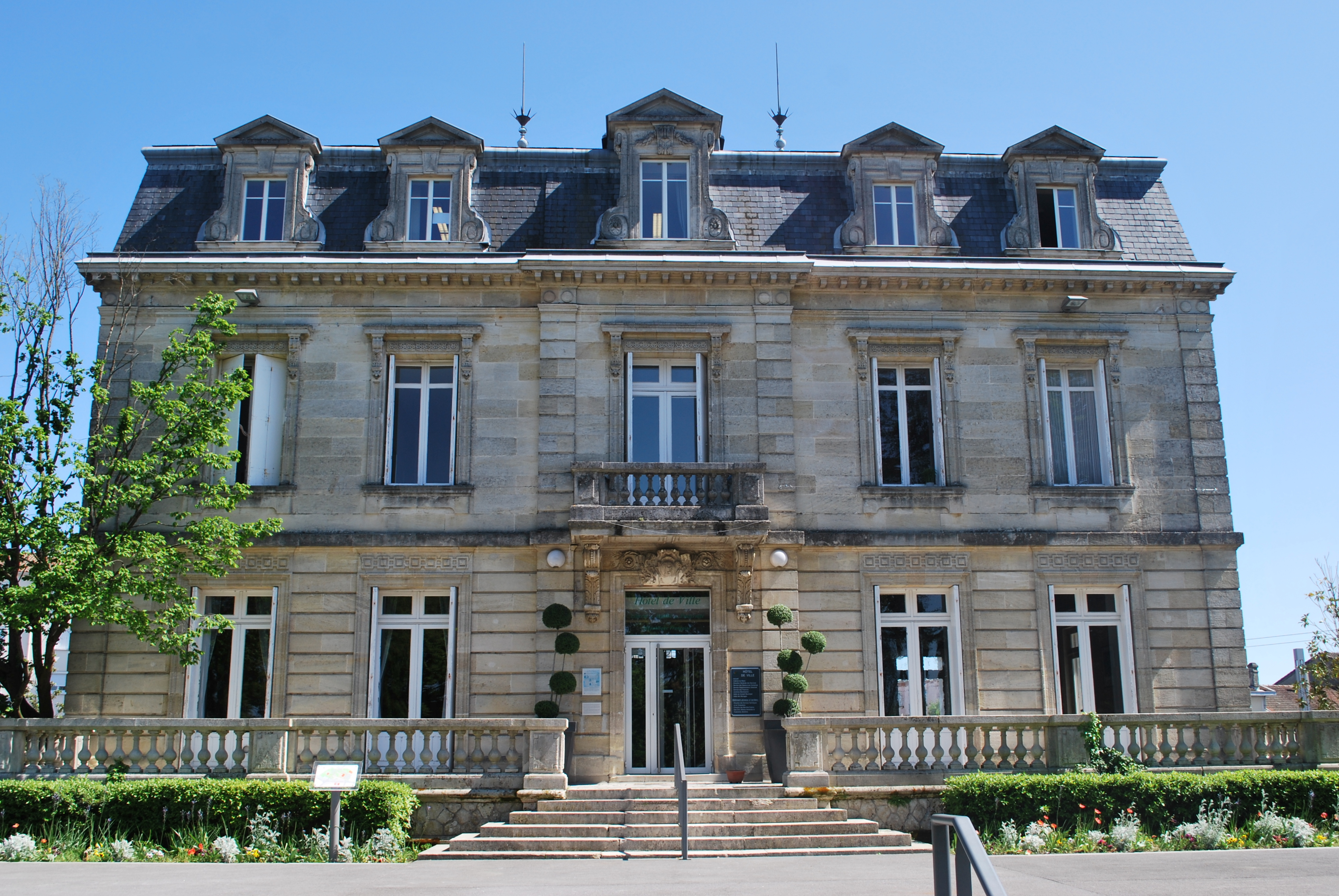
- The main frontage of the Hôtel de Ville in April 2017
- Interactive map of the Hôtel de Ville area

General information
- Type: City hall
- Architectural style: Neoclassical style
- Location: Lormont, France
- Coordinates: 44.8802°N 0.5231°W
- Completed: 1888

The Hôtel de Ville (French pronunciation: [otɛl də vil], City Hall) is a municipal building in Lormont, Gironde, in southwestern France, standing on Rue André Dupin.

== History ==
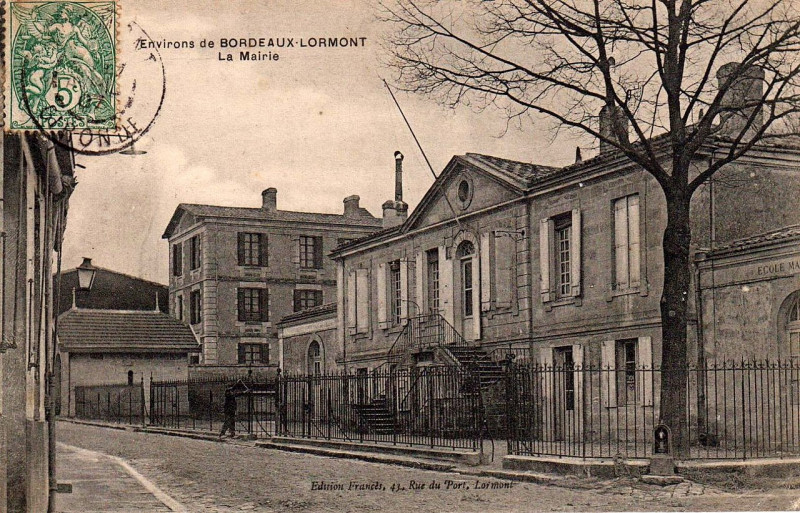
The old town hall

Following the French Revolution, the new town council initially met at the house of the mayor at the time. This arrangement continued until 1843 when the council decided to acquire a manor house on the south side of Rue de la République. The house had been designed in the neoclassical style, built in ashlar stone and had been completed in around 1800.

The design involved a symmetrical main frontage of seven bays facing onto Rue de la République. The central section of three bays, which was slightly projected forward, featured a forestair leading up to a round headed doorway on the first floor. The outer bays of the central section were fenestrated by casement windows and the section was flanked by banded pilasters supporting a pediment with an oculus in the tympanum. The outer bays of the building were fenestrated in a similar style. Single-storey pavilions, constructed to a design by Sieur Grelet, were added to accommodate a school for boys (on the left) and a nursery school (on the right) in 1865 and, after the boys relocated to a new school, the former school for boys accommodated girls from 1885. After the building was no longer required for municipal use, it was adapted by way of removal of the forestair in 1970, and converted for use as a museum in 1973.

In 1963, following significant population growth, the council led by the mayor, Paul Prévost Sansac de Traversay, decided to acquire a more substantial town hall. The building they selected was La Bachellerie on the east side of Route de Carbon Blanc. The site had served as a vineyard owned by the former bishop of Rodez, Gabriel de Voyer de Paulmy d'Argenson, in the 17th century. The building was commissioned by a former mayor, Ernest Bazille. It was designed in the neoclassical style, built in ashlar stone and was completed in 1888. The name, La Bachellerie, recalled the celebrations held by young people and youth associations in western France under the ancien regime.

The design involved a symmetrical main frontage of five bays facing towards Route de Carbon Blanc. The central bay featured a short flight of steps leading up to a doorway with a moulded surround on the ground floor, a French door with a cornice and a balustraded balcony on the first floor, and a dormer window at attic level. The other bays were fenestrated by tall casement windows on the first two floors and by dormer windows at attic level. Internally, the house accommodated spacious reception rooms on the ground floor and large bedrooms on the first floor. An extensive programme of landscaping, involving the creation of a park around the town hall, was completed in 2012.
