= Queue de Castor River =

Queue de Castor
- Watershed of Nottaway River

Location
- Country: Canada
- Province: Quebec
- Region: Nord-du-Québec

Physical characteristics
- Source: Beaucours Lake
  - location: Eeyou Istchee James Bay (municipality), Nord-du-Québec, Quebec
  - coordinates: 49°04′50″N 74°29′56″W
  - elevation: 405 m (1,329 ft)
- Mouth: Gabriel Lake (Opawica River tributary)
  - location: Eeyou Istchee James Bay (municipality), Nord-du-Québec, Quebec
  - coordinates: 49°14′30″N 74°26′24″W
  - elevation: 392 m (1,286 ft)
- Length: 23.6 km (14.7 mi)

Basin features
- Tributaries
  - left: (upstreams): Outlet of lake Joe; outlet of Lake Dick; outlet of Lakes Curuy and Miro; Eastman outlet; outlet of lake Hazel; outlet of lake Nelson.

The Queue de Castor River (English: “Beaver’s tail River”) is a tributary of Gabriel Lake, flowing into the Eeyou Istchee James Bay (Municipality), in Jamésie, in the administrative region of Nord-du-Québec, in Quebec, Canada.

This river successively crosses the townships of Beaucours, Feuquières and Robert. Forestry is the main economic activity of the sector; recreational tourism activities, second. A logging camp has been established on the west bank of Ventadour Lake near a forest road.

The South of “Queue de castor River” Valley is served by route 212 which connects Obedjiwan to La Tuque and passes south of Lake Dubois. From there, the forest road R1032 (North-South direction) passes on the strip of land between the head lakes of the “Queue de Castor River” and the Ventadour River.

The surface of the Beaver's Tail River is usually frozen from early November to mid-May, however Ice safety is usually from mid-November to mid-April.

== Geography ==
The surrounding hydrographic slopes of the “Queue de Castor River” are:
- north side: Cawcot River, Robert Lake (Opawica River tributary), Gabriel Lake (Opawica River tributary), Rohault Lake, Opawica River;
- east side: Ventadour River, Titipiti River, Robert Lake (Opawica River tributary), Normandin River, Poutrincourt Lake, Ashuapmushuan River;
- south side: Verreau Creek, Principal Lake, Gouin Reservoir, Wapous River, Magnan Lake;
- west side: Cawcot River, Yvonne River, Aigle River (Doda Lake).

The “Queue de Castor River” originates at the mouth of a Beaucours lake (length: 8.4 kilometres (5.2 mi); altitude: 405 metres (1,329 ft)) in Beaucours Township, in the Eeyou Istchee James Bay (municipality). This V-shaped lake has several small bodies of water in the northwest. It is fed by the Beaucours Creek (coming from the South).

The mouth of Beaucours Lake is located at 14.3 kilometres (8.9 mi) west of the Eeyou Istchee James Bay (municipality) boundary and the Regional County Municipality (RCM) Le Domaine-du-Roy.

The mouth of lake Beaucours is located at:

- 17.5 kilometres (10.9 mi) South of the mouth of the “Queue de Castor River” (confluence with Gabriel Lake);
- 29.4 kilometres (18.3 mi) south-east of the mouth of Gabriel Lake (Opawica River tributary);
- 47.9 kilometres (29.8 mi) south-east of the mouth of Caopatina Lake;
- 125.8 kilometres (78.2 mi) southeast of the confluence of the Opawica River and Chibougamau River, the head of the Waswanipi River;
- 388.4 kilometres (241.3 mi) southeasterly of the mouth of the Nottaway River (confluence with James Bay);
- 94.0 kilometres (58.4 mi) south-east of downtown Chibougamau;
- 28.6 kilometres (17.8 mi) north-east of Gouin Reservoir.

From the mouth of the head lake, the "Queue de Castor River" flows on 23.6 kilometres (14.7 mi) according to the following segments:

- 1.5 kilometres (0.93 mi) southeasterly to the west bank of an unidentified lake;
- 3.9 kilometres (2.4 mi) northeasterly across the northern part of an unidentified lake (length: 9.3 kilometres (5.8 mi); altitude: 402 metres (1,319 ft) ) to a road bridge;
- 6.4 kilometres (4.0 mi) to the north, crossing an unidentified lake (length: 4.0 kilometres (2.5 mi); altitude: 401 metres (1,316 ft)) that the current crosses on its full length, as far as the bridge of a forest road;
- 7.0 kilometres (4.3 mi) northeasterly across an area where the river widens to the limit of Robert Township;
- 4.8 kilometres (3.0 mi) northwesterly in Robert Township winding to mouth.

The “Queue de Castor River” flows into the bottom of a bay on the south shore of Gabriel Lake (Opawica River tributary) which flows through the North on 13.4 kilometres (8.3 mi). The latter, in turn, generally goes northwest, then west, then north, to its confluence with the Chibougamau River; this confluence is the source of the Waswanipi River. The course flows westward through the northern portion of Lake Waswanipi, Goéland Lake and Olga Lake, before pouring into the Matagami Lake which in turn flows into the Nottaway River, a tributary of Rupert Bay (James Bay).

The confluence of the "Queue de Castor River" with the Feuquières Lake is located at:

- 13.0 kilometres (8.1 mi) south-east of the mouth of Gabriel Lake (Opawica River tributary);
- 121.9 kilometres (75.7 mi) south-east of the mouth of the Opawica River (confluence with the Chibougamau River);
- 76.1 kilometres (47.3 mi) south of downtown Chibougamau;
- 68.5 kilometres (42.6 mi) south-east of the village center of Chapais, Quebec;
- 46.2 kilometres (28.7 mi) north of a bay on the north shore of Gouin Reservoir.

== Toponymy ==
At various times in history, this territory has been occupied by the Attikameks, the Algonquins and the Crees. Formerly, this hydronym was designated "Beavertail River".

The toponym "Queue de Castor River" was formalized on December 5, 1968, at the Commission de toponymie du Quebec, when it was created.

== See also ==
- James Bay
- Rupert Bay
- Nottaway River, a watercourse
- Matagami Lake, a body of water
- Waswanipi River, a watercourse
- Opawica River, a watercourse
- Gabriel Lake (Opawica River tributary), a body of water
- Eeyou Istchee James Bay (municipality)
- List of rivers of Quebec
