= Robert Lake =

Robert Lake (French: Lac Robert)
- Watershed of Nottaway River

- Location within Quebec
- Location: Eeyou Istchee James Bay (municipality)
- Coordinates: 49°13′18″N 74°22′00″W
- Type: Natural
- Primary inflows: Outlet of Lake Présent and Lake de l’Orfraie, outlet of Feuquières Lake, Ventadour River, outlet of Lake Hardy, outlet of Lake Elliot.
- Primary outflows: Outlet of Robert Lake downstream to Gabriel Lake (Opawica River tributary).
- Basin countries: Canada
- Max. length: 14.9 kilometres (9.3 mi)
- Max. width: 2.2 kilometres (1.4 mi)
- Surface elevation: 392 metres (1,286 ft)

Robert Lake is a freshwater body of the southeastern part of the Eeyou Istchee James Bay (municipality), in Jamésie, in the administrative region of Nord-du-Québec, in the province of Quebec, in Canada.

This body of water extends in the townships of Feuquières and Robert. Forestry is the main economic activity of the sector. Recreational tourism activities come second.

The Lake Robert hydrographic slope is accessible via the R1032 forest road (North-South direction) that passes on the west side of the lake. Lake Robert's surface is usually frozen from early November to mid-May, however, safe ice circulation is generally from mid-November to mid-April.

== Geography ==
Robert Lake is located near the administrative regions of Saguenay-Lac-Saint-Jean and Eeyou Istchee James Bay (municipality).

Robert Lake has a length of 14.9 kilometres (9.3 mi), a maximum width of 2.2 kilometres (1.4 mi) and an altitude of 392 metres (1,286 ft). This lake has several bays, peninsulas and islands.

The Ventadour River (coming from the South) is the main tributary of Lake Robert; the second, the outlet of Feuquières Lake (coming from the East).

The mouth of this Robert Lake is located at the bottom of a bay in the Northwest to:

- 11.5 kilometres (7.1 mi) south-east of the mouth of Gabriel Lake (Opawica River);
- 7.5 kilometres (4.7 mi) south of Rohault Lake;
- 35.4 kilometres (22.0 mi) south-east of the mouth of Caopatina Lake;
- 73.4 kilometres (45.6 mi) south of downtown Chibougamau;
- 66.8 kilometres (41.5 mi) south-east of the village center of Chapais, Quebec;
- 161.1 kilometres (100.1 mi) west of lac Saint-Jean;
- 49.0 kilometres (30.4 mi) north of Gouin Reservoir;
- 75.9 kilometres (47.2 mi) north-east of Obedjiwan village center.

The main hydrographic slopes near Lac Robert are:

- North side: Gabriel Lake (Opawica River), Rohault Lake, Nemenjiche River, Nemenjiche Lake, Nicabau Lake;
- East side: Feuquières Lake, Normandin River, Coquille River (Normandin River), Poutrincourt Lake;
- South side: Cawcot River, Queue de Castor River, Ventadour River, Titipiti River;
- West side: Cawcot River, Opawica River, Gabriel Lake (Opawica River), Surprise Lake (Roy River).

== Toponymy ==
The term "Robert" is a first name and family name of French origin.

The toponym "lac Robert" was officialized on December 5, 1968 by the Commission de toponymie du Québec, when it was created.

== See also ==
- James Bay
- Nottaway River, a watercourse
- Matagami Lake, a body of water
- Waswanipi River, a watercourse
- Opawica River, a watercourse
- Gabriel Lake (Opawica River tributary), a body of water
- Feuquières Lake, a body of water
- Ventadour River, a watercourse
- Eeyou Istchee Baie-James (unicipality), a municipality
- List of lakes in Canada
