= Vabres Cathedral =

Roman Catholic church in Vabres-l'Abbaye, France

Coordinates: 43°56′41″N 2°50′14″E

Vabres Cathedral Cathédrale Saint-Sauveur-et-Saint-Pierre de Vabres
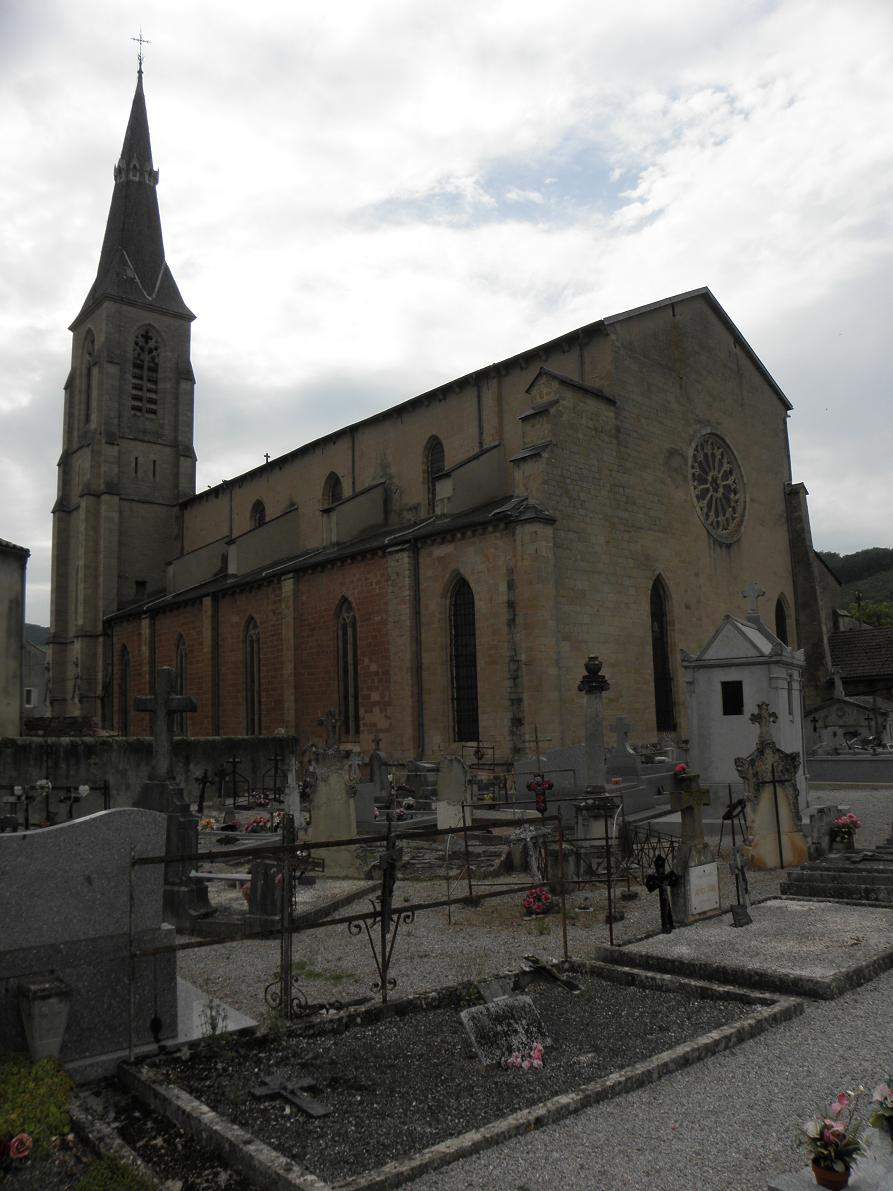
- Vabres Cathedral

Religion
- Affiliation: Roman Catholic Church
- Province: Bishopric of Vabres
- Region: Aveyron
- Rite: Roman
- Ecclesiastical or organisational status: Cathedral
- Status: Active

Location
- Location: Vabres-l'Abbaye, France
- Interactive map of Vabres Cathedral; Cathédrale Saint-Sauveur-et-Saint-Pierre de Vabres

Architecture
- Type: church

Vabres Cathedral (Cathédrale Saint-Sauveur-et-Saint-Pierre de Vabres) is a Roman Catholic church and former cathedral, dedicated to the Holy Saviour and Saint Peter, in Vabres-l'Abbaye, Aveyron, France.

It was formerly the seat of the Bishopric of Vabres, established in 1317 and abolished under the Concordat of 1801. It is now in the Diocese of Rodez.

In 1793, during the French Revolution, the cathedral was gutted by a battalion of the Revolutionary army. The soldiers removed a marble altar to build a monument for the recently murdered Jean-Paul Marat and then set fire to the cathedral.

The restored building serves as a parish church. Parts of it date from the 14th and 15th centuries, and it was registered as a historical monument in 1992.
