= Feuquières Lake =

Body of water in Quebec, Canada

- Watershed of Nottaway River

- Location within Quebec
- Location: Eeyou Istchee James Bay (municipality)
- Coordinates: 49°12′14″N 74°17′27″W
- Type: Natural
- Primary inflows: Outlet of Lake Salk, outlet of Daniel Lake, outlet of lakes Haro and Cardinal, Titipiti River.
- Primary outflows: Outlet of Feuquières Lake downstream to Robert Lake (Opawica River tributary).
- Basin countries: Canada
- Max. length: 12.7 kilometres (7.9 mi)
- Max. width: 3.0 kilometres (1.9 mi)
- Surface elevation: 392 metres (1,286 ft)

Feuquières Lake is a freshwater body of the southeastern portion of Eeyou Istchee James Bay (municipality), in Jamésie, in the administrative region of Nord-du-Québec, in the province of Quebec, in Canada.

This body of water extends in the townships of Feuquières and Robert. Forestry is the main economic activity of the sector. Recreational tourism activities come second.

The hydrographic slope of Lake Feuquières is accessible through the forest road R1032 (North-South direction) which passes on the west side of Gabriel Lake (Opawica River tributary); in addition, route 167 passes on the east side through the Normandin River, connecting Chibougamau to Saint-Félicien, Quebec. The surface of Lake Feuquières is usually frozen from early November to mid-May, however, safe ice circulation is generally from mid-November to mid-April.

== Geography ==
Lake Feuquières is located at 1.4 kilometres (0.87 mi) west of the administrative boundaries of Saguenay-Lac-Saint-Jean and Eeyou Istchee Baie-James (municipality).

Lake Feuquières has a length of 12.7 kilometres (7.9 mi), a maximum width of 3.0 kilometres (1.9 mi) and an altitude of 392 metres (1,286 ft). This lake has several bays, peninsulas and islands. Three peninsulas attached to the North shore advance towards the South (toward the center of the lake); one on 5.6 kilometres (3.5 mi), the second on 2.0 kilometres (1.2 mi) and the third on 4.2 kilometres (2.6 mi). Because of these three peninsulas, this river takes the form of a fork pointing to the North.

The Titipiti River (coming from the South) is the main tributary of Lake Feuquières; the second, the outlet of Salk Lake (coming from the North-East).

The mouth of this Lake Feuquières is located at the bottom of a bay in the North-West to:

- 20.0 kilometres (12.4 mi) south-east of the mouth of Gabriel Lake (Opawica River tributary);
- 13.8 kilometres (8.6 mi) south-east of Rohault Lake;
- 55.1 kilometres (34.2 mi) south-east of the mouth of Caopatina Lake;
- 83.7 kilometres (52.0 mi) south-east of downtown Chibougamau;
- 84.1 kilometres (52.3 mi) south-east of the village center of Chapais, Quebec;
- 77.0 kilometres (47.8 mi) west of lac Saint-Jean;
- 92.1 kilometres (57.2 mi) north of Gouin Reservoir;
- 24.1 kilometres (15.0 mi) north-east of [Obedjiwan] village center.

The main hydrographic slopes near Lake Feuquières are:

- North side: Rohault lake, Bouteroue Lake, Nemenjiche River, Nemenjiche Lake, Nicabau Lake;
- East side: Salk Lake, Finbar Lake, Normandin River, Marquette River West, Poutrincourt Lake;
- South side: Queue de Castor River, Ventadour River, Titipiti River;
- West side: Cawcot River, Opawica River, Robert Lake (Opawica River tributary), Gabriel Lake (Opawica River tributary), Surprise Lake (Roy River) .

== Toponymy ==
This hydronym evokes the work of life of Isaac de Pas, marquess of Feuquières (1618-1688), colonel of infantry and lieutenant general. He served as viceroy of New France, from August 30, 1660 to October 5, 1661. This hydronym was made official on November 2, 1956 by the Quebec Geography Commission, the current Commission de toponymie du Quebec.

The toponym "Lac Feuquières" was officialized on December 5, 1968 by the Commission de toponymie du Québec, when it was created.

== See also ==
- James Bay
- Nottaway River, a watercourse
- Matagami Lake, a body of water
- Waswanipi River, a watercourse
- Opawica River, a watercourse
- Gabriel Lake (Opawica River tributary), a body of water
- Robert Lake (Opawica River tributary), a body of water
- Eeyou Istchee Baie-James (municipality), a municipality
- List of lakes in Canada
