= Dalmatius of Rodez =

French saint and bishop

Saint Dalmatius of Rodez

Bishop
- Died: c. 580 AD
- Venerated in: Roman Catholic Church
- Feast: November 13

Saint Dalmatius of Rodez (French: Saint Dalmas, Dalmace) was a bishop of Rodez from 524 to 580.

Dalmatius was born in the late 400s in Gaul; he became bishop of Rodez in 524 at a relatively young man age. He is considered by the Catholic Church to have suffered at the hands of Amalaric, who was a follower of Arianism. In 535, Dalmatius attended the Council of Arvernum, which among its sixteen decrees, held that the granting of episcopal dignity must be according to the merits and not as a result of intrigues. In 541, he attended the Fourth Council of Orléans and on his return made a pilgrimage to the tomb of Martin of Tours.

Gregory of Tours reports that Dalmatius built a church, but tore it down so often for improvements, that it was left unfinished at his death. Dalmatius' testament requested from Childebert II that the bishop's successor not be a stranger to the see, or covetous, or married. His successor should be someone who spent all of his time praising God. His feast day is November 13.
