= Order of Aubrac =

Middle Ages military order and hospital

Coordinates: 44.6219°N 2.9861°E

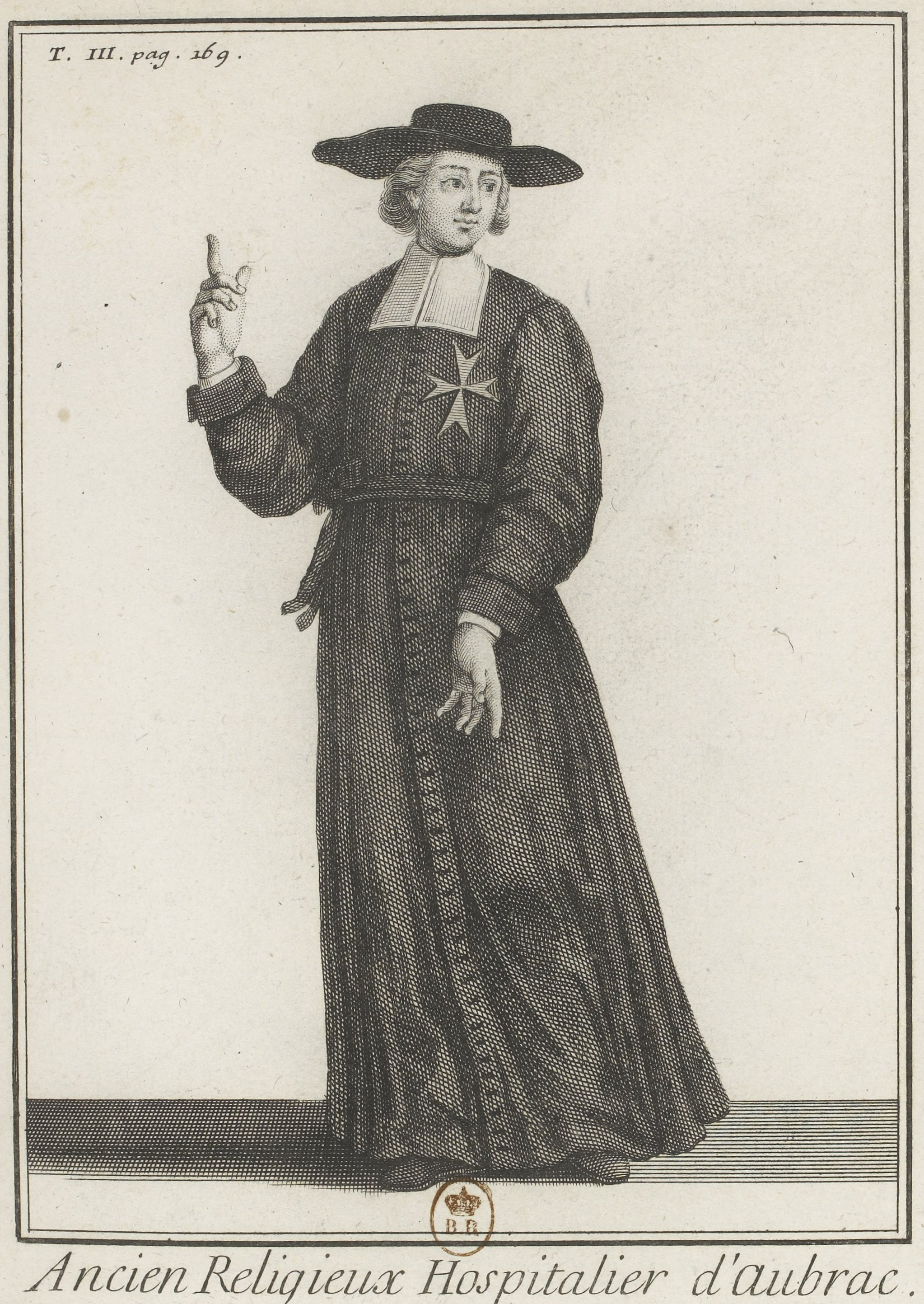
Order's robes, from a 1792 work

The Order of Aubrac was a military order and hospital (hôtel-Dieu) chartered in the twelfth century. It operated in the Rouergue to protect and care for pilgrims on the Way of Saint James and the Via Francigena.

The headquarters of the order was the monastery and hospital called the Dômerie d'Aubrac in the town of Aubrac in the Diocese of Rodez. According to later tradition, it was founded in 1031 by Adalard, viscount of Flanders, who was beset by brigands while passing through the County of Rouergue on his way to the shrine of Saint James in Compostela. If this later story is accurate, then the Order of Aubrac is a unique example in the eleventh century of a military order in the style of the later Knights Templar and Knights Hospitaller.

The Order was chartered in 1120 or 1122 and adopted the Augustinian rule with the approval of Bishop Peter of Rodez in 1162. The Order's statutes from that year survive. They were revised several times in the later Middle Ages. The Order included priests, knights, lay brothers, noblewomen and lay sisters. Satellite hospitals, called "commanderies", were established at Bozouls, Milhau, Najac, and Rodez. Though never large, the Knights Hospitaller failed in several attempts to annex it and it remained independent and operational until the French Revolution, when it disappeared.

Paul Crawford in his 1993 study of military orders, classifies Aubrac as one of the "hospitaller orders which may have had military functions" alongside Order of Saint James of Altopascio and the Order of Saint Anthony of Vienne, while noting that it is the only one of the three that seems definitely to have had a military status.
