= Charles-André-Toussaint-Bruno de Ramond-Lalande =

Charles-André-Toussaint-Bruno de Ramond-Lalande (1 November 1761, Montauban – 10 April 1830, Paris) was a Roman Catholic clergyman and bishop. He was bishop of Rodez from 1817 to 1830 and archbishop-designate of Sens in 1830.

== Life ==
The son of Philippe-Daniel de Ramond, a squire, conseiller du roi and treasurer of the Généralité de Montauban, and his wife Henriette Colomb. His father chose to send him into the church and he arrived in Paris in 1780. He spent two years at the collège du Plessis before studying at the Saint-Sulpice Seminary and then the Sorbonne. On 1 May 1793 he was made director of the seminary of the Paris Foreign Missions Society by the two directors who had fled to Amiens due to the French Revolution, but this was later annulled. He only became the curé of the parish church of église Saint-Thomas-d'Aquin de Paris after the 1801 Concordat.

After the Bourbon Restoration he was made bishop of Rodez in 1817, an appointment confirmed on 1 October that year. However, it was not validated by the chambers set up by the 1817 Concordat and so he was not consecrated bishop until 1823 by Hyacinthe-Louis de Quélen, archbishop of Paris. On 9 January 1830 he was named archbishop of Sens, but he died on 10 April the same year before this could be confirmed and before he could take possession of his new diocese.

== Sources ==
- http://archives.mepasie.org/notices/notices-biographiques/ramond-lalande
- http://gallica.bnf.fr/ark:/12148/bpt6k55180748/f186.image.r=Ramond-Lalande
