= Louis Abelly =

French priest (1603–1691)

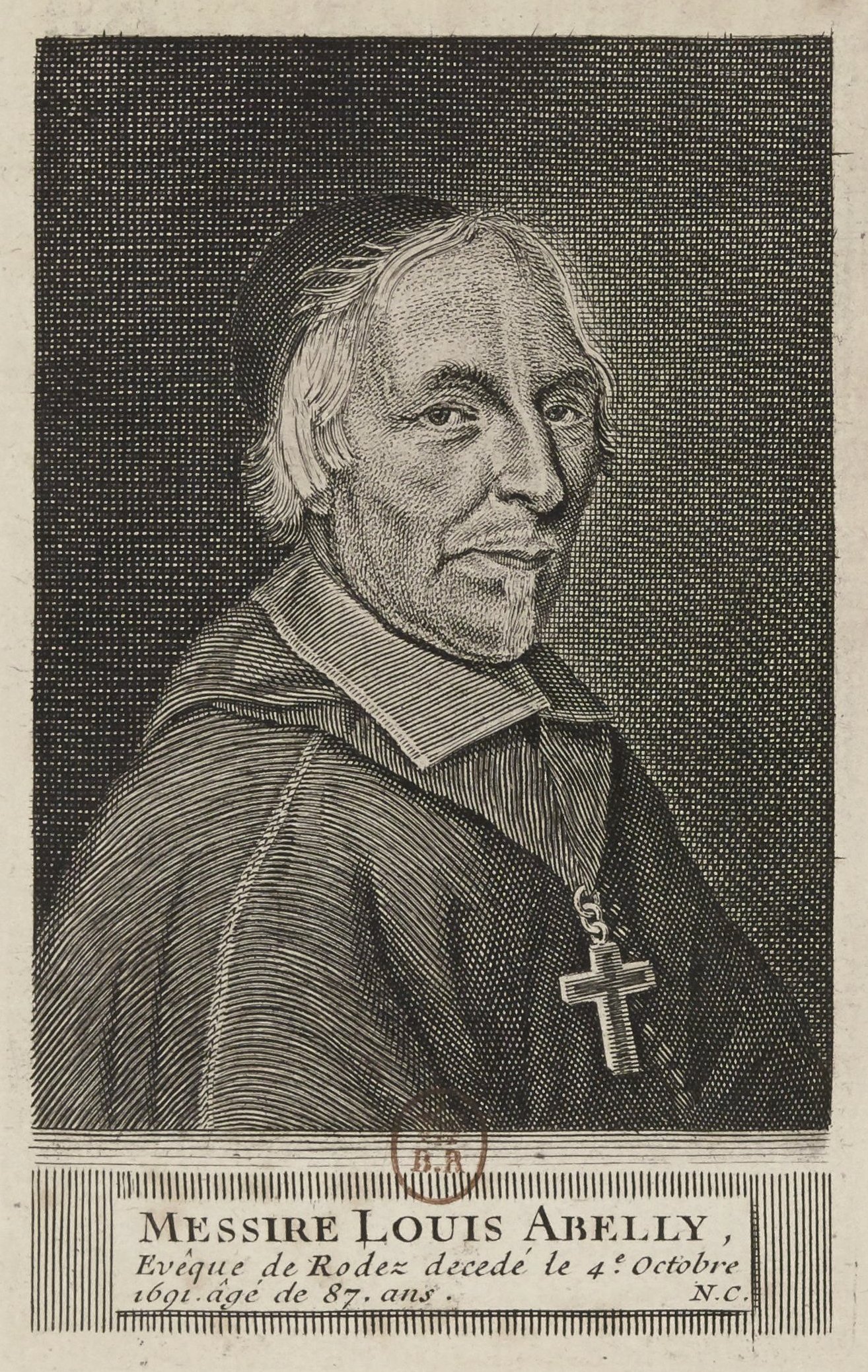

Louis Abelly (1603–1691) was Vicar-General of Bayonne, a parish priest in Paris, and subsequently Bishop of Rodez in 1664.

== Biography ==
In 1666, Abelly abdicated and attached himself to Vincent de Paul in the House of St. Lazare, Paris (Lazarists). His ascetical works reveal his deep and sincere piety. He was a bitter foe of the Jansenists, chiefly of Jean du Vergier de Hauranne, against whom he directed his Life of St. Vincent de Paul, a work which Hurter describes as "full of unction."

His Medulla Theologica went through many editions, and is characterized by its "solidity, directness, and usefulness." According to Alphonsus Liguori, Abelly is "a classic in probabilism." His Défense de la hiérarchie de l'Eglise was directed against an anonymous Gallican writer. He wrote also two Enchiridions, one for bishops, another for priests; a treatise entitled De l'obéissance et soumission due au Pape; and another called Traité des Hérésies. Replying to a Jansenist work known as Monita Salutaria, he published his Sentiments des SS. Pères, touchant les excellences et les prérogatives de la T.S. Vierge.
