= Joseph-Christian-Ernest Bourret =

French churchman, bishop and cardinal

His Eminence Joseph-Christian-Ernest Bourret
- Bishop of Rodez
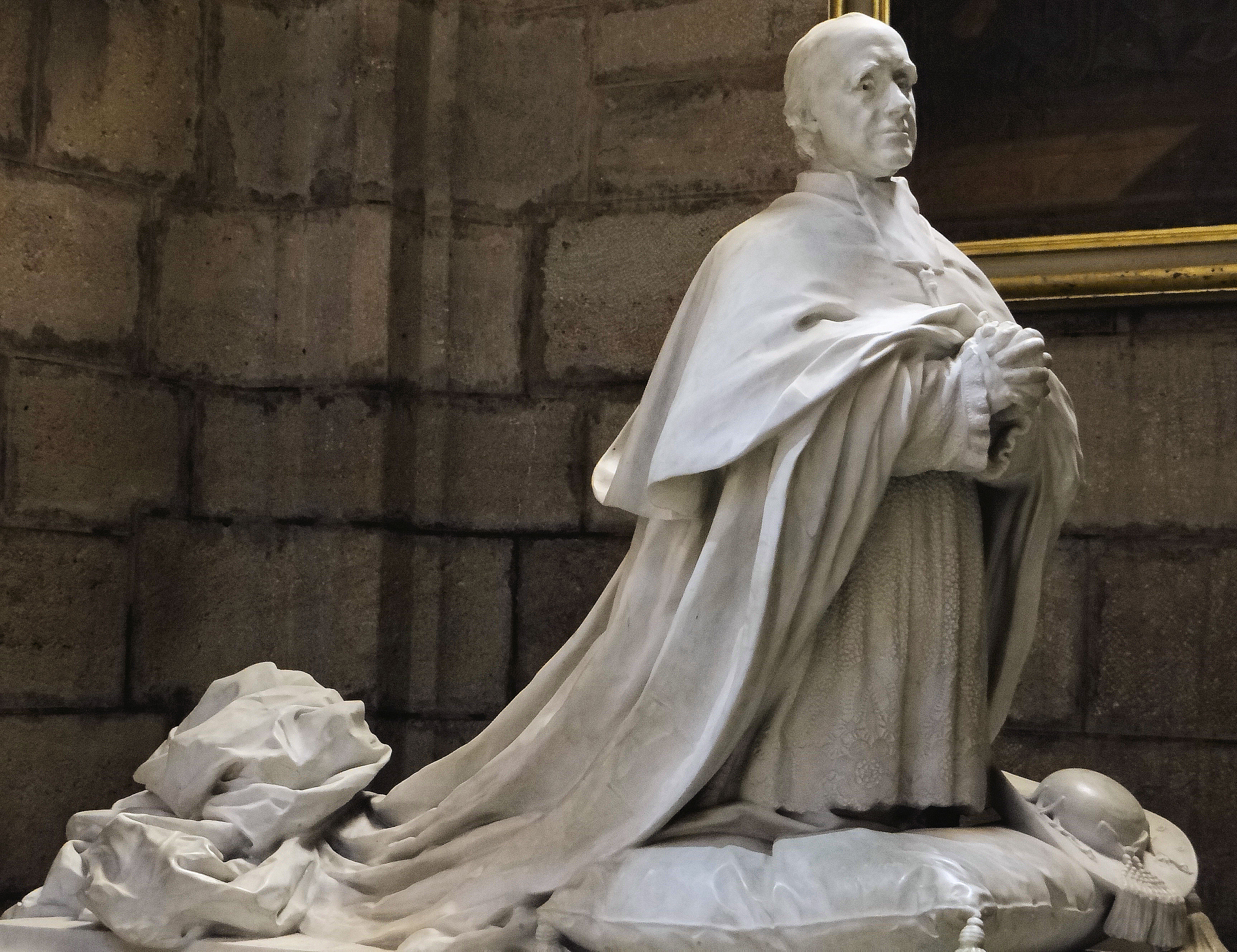
- Statute of Rodez - Cathédrale Notre-Dame - Tombeau du cardinal Joseph Bourret
- Church: Roman Catholic Church
- Diocese: Rodez
- See: Rodez
- Appointed: 27 October 1871
- Term ended: 10 July 1896
- Predecessor: Louis-Auguste Delalle
- Successor: Jean-Augustin Germain
- Other post: Cardinal-Priest of Santa Maria Nuova (1894-96)

Orders
- Ordination: 20 September 1851 by Georges Jacquot
- Consecration: 30 November 1871 by Joseph-Hippolyte Guibert
- Created cardinal: 12 June 1893 by Pope Leo XIII
- Rank: Cardinal-Priest

Personal details
- Born: Joseph-Christian-Ernest Bourret; 9 December 1827 Lubro, French Kingdom
- Died: 10 July 1896 (aged 68) Rodez, French Third Republic
- Buried: Rodez Cathedral
- Parents: Louis Bourret; Ursule Christine Bonhomme
- Education: Sorbonne University
- Motto: Robur et solatium
- Coat of arms

Styles of Joseph-Christian-Ernest Bourret
- Reference style: His Eminence
- Spoken style: Your Eminence
- Informal style: Cardinal
- See: Rodez

Joseph Christian Ernest Bourret (9 December 1827 in the hamlet of Labro, near Saint-Étienne-de-Lugdarès, Ardèche – 10 July 1896 in Rodez) was a French churchman, bishop and cardinal.

== Life ==
Joseph-Christian-Ernest Bourret was ordained into the Oratory of Saint Philip Neri as priest in 1851 in Paris. He was ordained bishop of Rodez in 1871, and made a cardinal by Pope Leo XIII in 1893.

== Sources ==
- This page is a translation of fr:Joseph-Christian-Ernest Bourret.
- Catholic Hierarchy.org
