= Cawcot River =

Cawcot
- Watershed of Nottaway River

Location
- Country: Canada
- Province: Quebec
- Region: Nord-du-Québec

Physical characteristics
- Source: Confluence of two forested lakes
  - location: Eeyou Istchee James Bay (municipality), Nord-du-Québec, Quebec
  - coordinates: 49°04′30″N 74°44′26″W
  - elevation: 450 m (1,480 ft)
- Mouth: Gabriel Lake (Opawica River tributary)
  - location: Eeyou Istchee James Bay (municipality), Nord-du-Québec, Quebec
  - coordinates: 49°18′22″N 74°28′22″W
  - elevation: 392 m (1,286 ft)
- Length: 44.2 km (27.5 mi)

Basin features
- Tributaries
  - left: (upstreams): Outlet of lake Monaco; outlet of Lake Némégousse; outlet of Lakes Chaignot and Roy.

The Cawcot River is a tributary of Gabriel Lake, flowing into the municipality of Baie-James, Jamésie, in the administrative region of Nord-du-Québec, Quebec, Canada.

This river crosses successively the cantons of Chambalon, Beaucours, Crisafy. Forestry is the main economic activity of the sector; recreational tourism activities, second. A logging camp has been established on the west bank of Lake Ventadour near the forest road.

The south of the Cawcot River Valley is served by route 212 which connects Obedjiwan to La Tuque and passes south of Lake Dubois. From there, the forest road R1032 (North–south direction) passes over the strip of land between the Queue de Castor River and the Ventadour River.

The surface of the Cawcot River is usually frozen from early November to mid-May, however, safe ice movement is generally from mid-November to mid-April.

== Geography ==
The adjacent hydrographic slopes of the Cawcot River are:
- north side: Gabriel Lake, Opawica River, Nemenjiche Lake, Nemenjiche River;
- east side: Gabriel Lake, Queue de Castor River, Ventadour River, Titipiti River, Robert Lake, Normandin River;
- south side: Eau Claire Creek, Gouin Reservoir, Wapous River, Magnan Lake;
- west side: Lake Roy, Yvonne River, Aigle River (Doda Lake).

The Cawcot River originates at the confluence of two forest streams (elevation: 450 metres (1,480 ft)) in the township of Chambalon, in Eeyou Istchee James Bay (municipality). This source is located at 27.2 kilometres (16.9 mi) west of the Eeyou Istchee James Bay (municipality) and Le Domaine-du-Roy Regional County Municipality (RCM).

This source is located at:

- 28.4 kilometres (17.6 mi) south-west of the mouth of the Cawcot River (confluence with Gabriel Lake);
- 30.9 kilometres (19.2 mi) south of the mouth of Gabriel Lake;
- 41.3 kilometres (25.7 mi) south-east of the mouth of Caopatina Lake;
- 111 kilometres (69 mi) south-east of the confluence of the Opawica River and the Chibougamau River, the head of the Waswanipi River;
- 374 kilometres (232 mi) southeasterly of the mouth of the Nottaway River (confluence with James Bay);
- 93.5 kilometres (58.1 mi) South of downtown Chibougamau;
- 33.9 kilometres (21.1 mi) northwest of a bay of Gouin Reservoir.

From the confluence of two forest streams, the Cawcot River flows over 44.2 kilometres (27.5 mi) according to the following segments:

- 4.2 kilometres (2.6 mi) southwesterly, then north, to the southwestern shore of Cawcot Lake;
- 3.8 kilometres (2.4 mi) northeasterly across Cawcot Lake (elevation: 443 metres (1,453 ft)) to its full length, passing to the northeast of a mountain whose peak reached 582 metres (1,909 ft);
- 14.0 kilometres (8.7 mi) northeasterly to the limit of the township of Beaucours;
- 8.4 kilometres (5.2 mi) northeasterly in the township of Beaucours, to the limit of the township of Crisafy;
- 12.1 kilometres (7.5 mi) north-east in Crisafy Township, to R1032 Forest Road (North-South direction);
- 5.5 kilometres (3.4 mi) northeasterly in a marsh zone to its mouth.

The Cawcot River flows to the west shore of Gabriel Lake (Opawica River tributary); thence the current crosses this lake towards North on 5.6 kilometres (3.5 mi). The latter, in turn, generally goes northwest, then west, then north, to its confluence with the Chibougamau River; this confluence is the source of the Waswanipi River. The course of the latter flows west and crosses successively the northern part of the Lake Waswanipi, Goéland Lake and Olga Lake, before entering the Matagami Lake which in turn flows into the Nottaway River, a tributary of Rupert Bay (James Bay).

The confluence of the Cawcot River with Gabriel Lake (Opawica River tributary) is located at:

- 4.6 kilometres (2.9 mi) south-east of the mouth of Gabriel Lake 116.9 kilometres (72.6 mi) southeast of the mouth of the Opawica River (confluence with the Chibougamau River);
- 68.4 kilometres (42.5 mi) south of downtown Chibougamau;
- 60 kilometres (37 mi) south-east of the village center of Chapais, Quebec;
- 53.8 kilometres (33.4 mi) north of a bay on the north shore of Gouin Reservoir.

== Toponymy ==
At various times in history, this territory has been occupied by the Attikameks, the Algonquins and the Crees. The term "Cawcot" is a first name of English origin.

The toponym "Cawcot River" was formalized on December 5, 1968, at the Commission de toponymie du Québec, when it was created.

== See also ==
- James Bay
- Rupert Bay
- Nottaway River, a watercourse
- Matagami Lake, a body of water
- Waswanipi River, a watercourse
- Opawica River, a watercourse
- Gabriel Lake (Opawica River tributary), a body of water
- Eeyou Istchee James Bay (municipality)
- List of rivers of Quebec
