= Bellino Giusto Ghirard =

French Roman Catholic bishop

- Bishop of Rodez
- Church: Catholic Church
- Diocese: Diocese of Rodez
- In office: 1 June 1991 – 2 April 2011
- Predecessor: Roger Bourrat
- Successor: François Fonlupt
- Previous post: Coadjutor Bishop of Rodez (1990-1991)

Orders
- Ordination: 30 June 1962 by Roger Johan
- Consecration: 17 June 1990 by Sabin Saint-Gaudens

Personal details
- Born: 22 May 1935 Seyches, Lot-et-Garonne, France
- Died: 26 July 2013 (aged 78)

Bellino Giusto Ghirard (22 May 1935 − 26 July 2013) was a French Roman Catholic bishop.

Ordained to the priesthood in 1962, Ghirard was appointed coadjutor bishop of the Roman Catholic Diocese of Rodez, France, in 1990 and succeeded to the diocese in 1991 retiring in 2011.
