= Ancient Diocese of Vabres =

Roman Catholic diocese in France (1317 - 1801)

Coordinates: 43.94°N 2.84°E

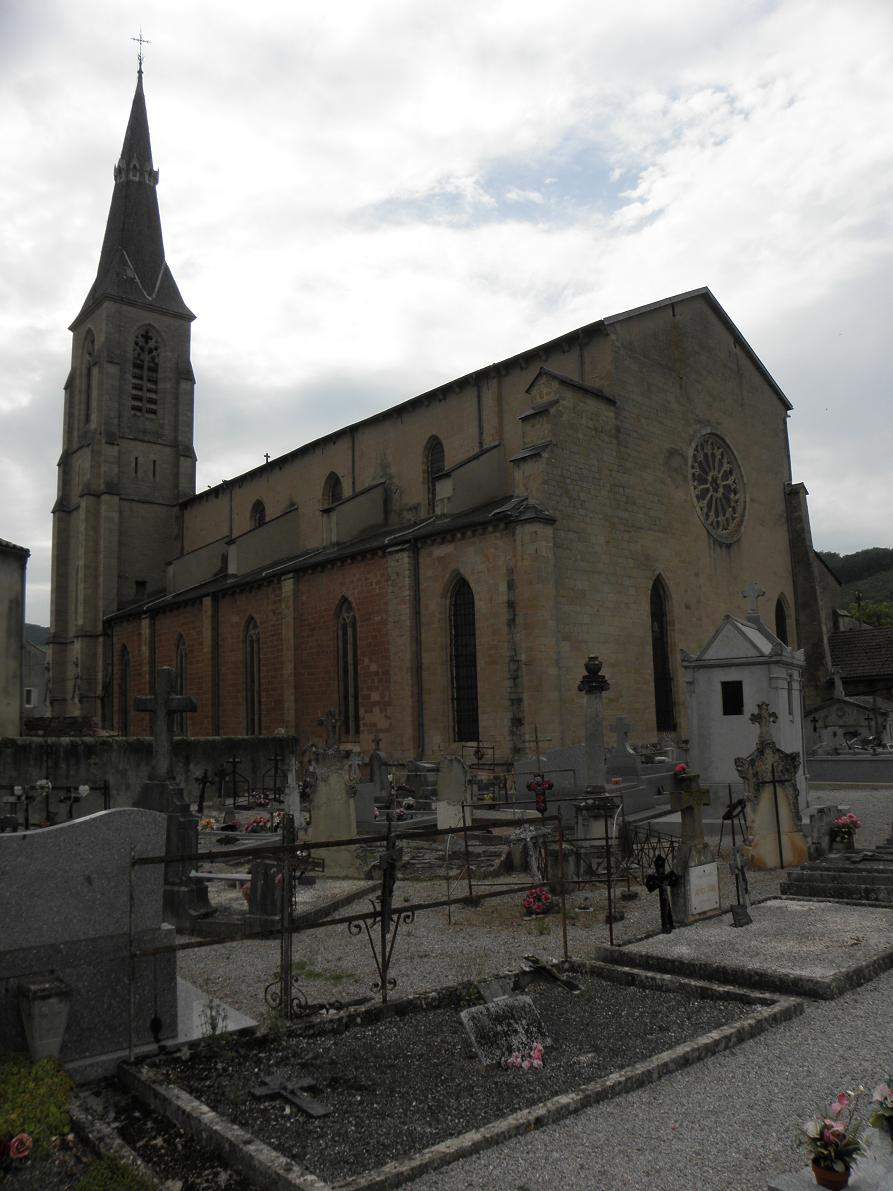
Vabres Cathedral

The former French Catholic diocese of Vabres existed from 1317 to the French Revolution. After the Concordat of 1801 its territory was divided between the diocese of Cahors and the diocese of Montpellier.

The Benedictine Abbey of Vabres, founded in 862 by Raymond I, Count of Toulouse, was raised to episcopal rank in 1317, and its diocesan territory was taken from the southeastern portion of the Diocese of Rodez. Its see was Vabres Cathedral.

== Bishops ==
- Pierre d'Olargues (1317–1329)
- Raymond d'Olargues (1329–1347)
- Pierre d'Aigrefeuille (1347–1349)
- Guy de Ventadour (1349–1352)
- Bertrand de Pébrac (1352–1360)
- Guillaume Bragosse (1361)
- Etienne de Vassignac (1362–1409)
- Mathieu Proti (1409–1413)
- Guillaume de Bastidos (1413–1421)
- Jean de Pierre (1421–1453)
- Bernard de Blanc (1453–1485)
- Antoine Pierre de Narbonne (1486–1499)
- Louis de Narbonne (1499–1518)
- Réginal de Marigny (1519–1536)
- Georges d'Armagnac (1536–1547) (administrator, also Bishop of Rodez)
- Jacques de Corneillan (1547–1561) (administrator, also Bishop of Rodez)
- François I. de la Valette-Cormusson (1561–1585)
- Thomas de Lauro (1585–1593)
- François II. de la Valette-Cormusson (1600–1622)
- François III. de la Valette-Cormusson (1622–1644)
- Isaac Hubert (1645–1668)
- Louis de la Vermhe Montemard de Tressan (1669–1671)
- Louis de Baradat (1673–1710)
- Charles-Alexandre le Filleul de la Chapelle (1710–1764)
- Jean de la Croix de Castrie (1764–1796)

== See also ==
- Catholic Church in France
- List of Catholic dioceses in France

== Bibliography ==
=== Sources ===
- Gams, Pius Bonifatius (1873). Series episcoporum Ecclesiae catholicae: quotquot innotuerunt a beato Petro apostolo. Ratisbon: Typis et Sumptibus Georgii Josephi Manz. pp. 548–549. (Use with caution; obsolete)
- Eubel, Conradus, ed. (1913). Hierarchia catholica, Tomus 1 (second ed.). Münster: Libreria Regensbergiana. p. 301. (in Latin)
- Eubel, Conradus, ed. (1914). Hierarchia catholica, Tomus 2 (second ed.). Münster: Libreria Regensbergiana. p. 175.
- Eubel, Conradus, ed. (1923). Hierarchia catholica, Tomus 3 (second ed.). Münster: Libreria Regensbergiana.
- Gauchat, Patritius (Patrice) (1935). Hierarchia catholica IV (1592-1667). Münster: Libraria Regensbergiana. p. 219.
- Ritzler, Remigius; Sefrin, Pirminus (1952). Hierarchia catholica medii et recentis aevi V (1667-1730). Patavii: Messagero di S. Antonio.

=== Studies ===
- Jean, Armand (1891). Les évêques et les archevêques de France depuis 1682 jusqu'à 1801 (in French). Paris: A. Picard. p. 520.
- Pisani, Paul (1907). Répertoire biographique de l'épiscopat constitutionnel (1791-1802) (in French). Paris: A. Picard et fils.
