= Gabriel Lake =

Lake in Jamésie, Quebec, Canada

Surprise Lake
- Watershed of Nottaway River

- Location within Quebec
- Location: Eeyou Istchee James Bay (municipality)
- Coordinates: 49°18′06″N 74°27′58″W
- Type: Natural
- Primary inflows: Lake de la Chopine, Titipiti River (via Feuquières Lake), Ventadour Lake (Ventadour River) (via Robert Lake (Opawica River)), Queue de Castor River, outlet of Eau Rouge Lake, Cawcot River.
- Primary outflows: Opawica River
- Basin countries: Canada
- Max. length: 17.6 kilometres (10.9 mi)
- Max. width: 5.1 kilometres (3.2 mi)
- Surface elevation: 392 metres (1,286 ft)

Gabriel Lake is a forest freshwater body in the southeastern part of the Eeyou Istchee James Bay (municipality), in Jamésie, in the administrative region of Nord-du-Québec, in the province of Quebec, in Canada.

This body of water extends in the townships of Rohault, Robert and Crisafy. Forestry is the main economic activity of the sector. Recreational tourism activities come second.

The watershed of Lake Gabriel is accessible via the R1032 forest road (North-South direction) which passes on the west side of the lake. The surface of Lake Gabriel is usually frozen from early November to mid-May, however, safe ice circulation is generally from mid-November to mid-April.

== Geography ==
Lake Gabriel is located near the administrative regions of Saguenay-Lac-Saint-Jean and Eeyou Istchee Baie-James (municipality).

Gabriel Lake has a length of 17.6 kilometres (10.9 mi), a maximum width of 5.1 kilometres (3.2 mi) and an altitude of 392 metres (1,286 ft). This lake has several bays, peninsulas and islands. The Gabriel Lake includes a peninsula attached to the South shore stretching on 3.6 kilometres (2.2 mi) towards the north meaning towards the center of the lake; the bottom of this bay receives the waters of the "Lac à l'Eau Rouge", located in the South. Another peninsula attached to the east bank advances towards the center of the lake, separating the lake in two, facing the opening of the bay stretching north-west to the mouth of the lake.

Gabriel Lake gets its supplies from:

- East by the discharge of "Lake Chopine" and the outlet of Robert Lake (Opawica River) which receives the waters of Feuquières Lake and the Ventadour River;
- South by the Queue de Castor River;
- West by the Cawcot River and the outlet of the "Eau Rouge lake".

The mouth of this Gabriel Lake is located at the bottom of a bay in the Northwest to:

- 1.9 kilometres (1.2 mi) west of Rohault Lake;
- 17.0 kilometres (10.6 mi) south-east of the mouth of Caopatina Lake;
- 64.0 kilometres (39.8 mi) South of downtown Chibougamau;
- 55.6 kilometres (34.5 mi) south-east of the village center of Chapais, Quebec;
- 171.4 kilometres (106.5 mi) west of Lake Saint-Jean;
- 57.0 kilometres (35.4 mi) north of Gouin Reservoir;
- 81.5 kilometres (50.6 mi) north of Obedjiwan Indian Reserve.

The main hydrographic slopes near Gabriel Lake are:

- North side: Opawica River, Rohault Lake, Nemenjiche River, Nemenjiche Lake, La Dauversière Lake;
- East side: Robert Lake (Opawica River), Normandin River, Coquille River (Normandin River), Nicabau Lake, Rohault Lake;
- South side: Cawcot River, Ventadour River, Titipiti River;
- West side: Cawcot River, Opawica River, Surprise Lake (Roy River).

== Toponymy ==
The term "Gabriel" is a name of French origin.

The toponym "lac Gabriel" was formalized on December 5, 1968, by the Commission de toponymie du Québec, when it was created.

== See also ==
- James Bay
- Nottaway River, a watercourse
- Matagami Lake, a body of water
- Waswanipi River, a watercourse
- Opawica River, a watercourse
- Queue de Castor River, a watercourse
- Cawcot River, a watercourse
- Ventadour River, a watercourse
- Titipiti River, a watercourse
- Eeyou Istchee Baie-James (municipality), a municipality
- List of lakes in Canada
