= Diocese of Rodez =

Catholic diocese in France

Coordinates: 44.35°N 2.57°E

Diocese of Rodez (–Vabres) Dioecesis Ruthenensis (–Vabrensis) Diocèse de Rodez (–Vabres)

Catholic
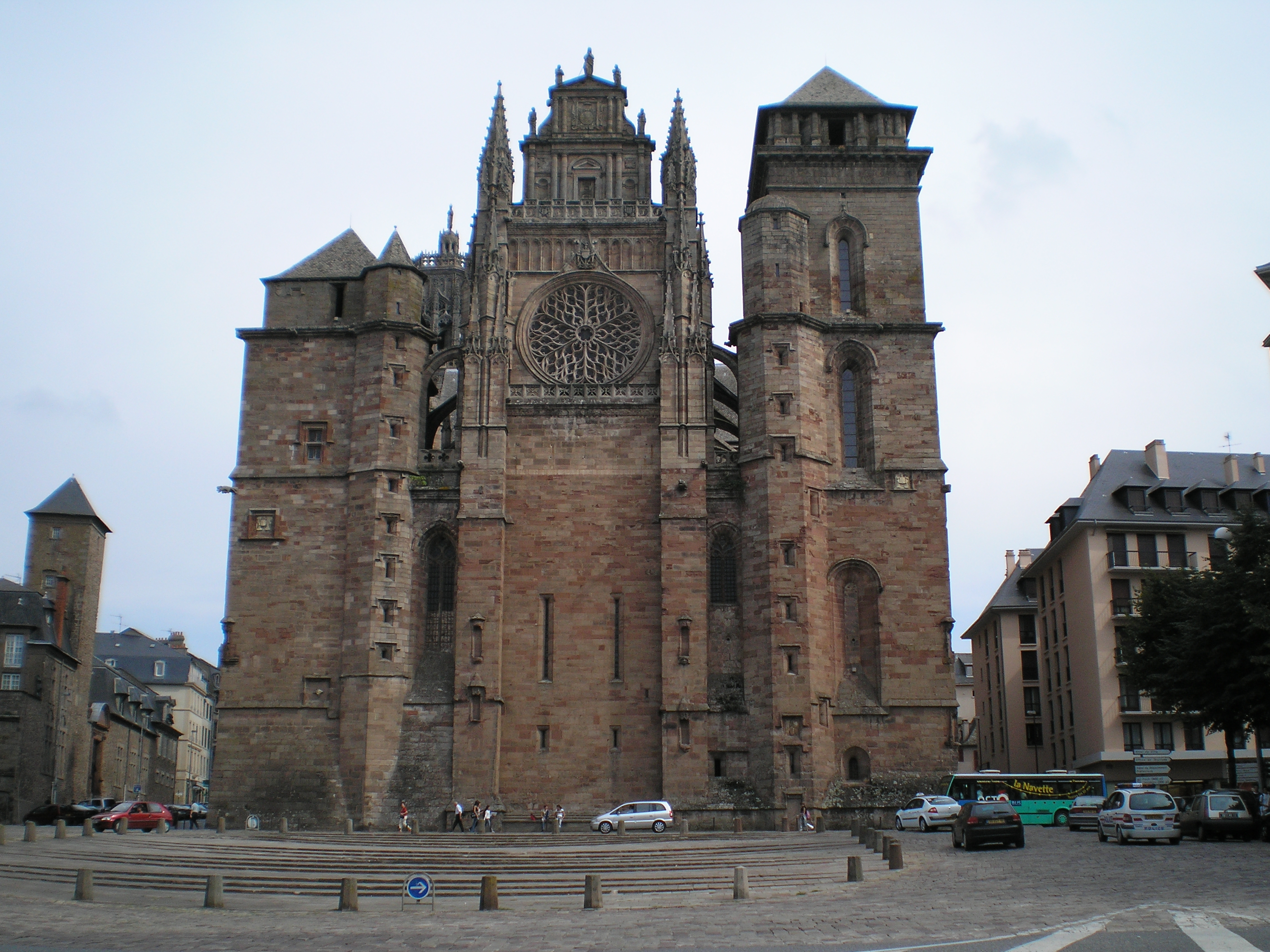
- Rodez Cathedral

Location
- Country: France
- Ecclesiastical province: Toulouse
- Metropolitan: Archdiocese of Toulouse

Statistics
- Area: 8,743 km^{2} (3,376 sq mi)
- Population: Total; Catholics: (as of 2022); 279,595 (est.); 273,595 (est.) (97.9%)
- Parishes: 36

Information
- Denomination: Catholic Church
- Sui iuris church: Latin Church
- Rite: Roman Rite
- Established: 5th century (As Diocese of Rodez); 27 May 1875 (As Diocese of Rodez-Vabres)
- Cathedral: Cathedral Basilica of Notre Dame in Rodez
- Patron saint: St. Amandus
- Secular priests: 77 (Diocesan); 11 (Religious Orders); 12 Permanent Deacons

Current leadership
- Pope: Leo XIV
- Bishop elect: Luc Meyer
- Metropolitan Archbishop: Guy de Kerimel

Map

Website
- Website of the Diocese

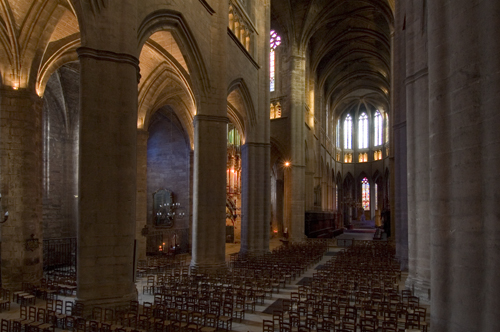
Interior of the cathedral, Rodez

The Diocese of Rodez (–Vabres) (Latin: Dioecesis Ruthenensis (–Vabrensis); French: Diocèse de Rodez (–Vabres)) is a Latin Church ecclesiastical territory or diocese of the Catholic Church in France. The episcopal see is in Rodez. The diocese corresponds exactly to the Department of Aveyron (formerly Rouergue). Since 7 July 2022, the bishop of Rodez have been Luc Meyer, who was appointed by Pope Francis.

Originally erected in the 5th century, the Diocese of Rodez lost territory when the Diocese of Vabres was created by Pope John XXII on 11 July 1317. In 1801, the diocese was suppressed and its territory split and merged with the Diocese of Cahors and the Diocese of Saint-Flour.

In 1817, the diocese was restored and given jurisdiction over the ancient Diocese of Rodez, with the exception of (1) the deanery of Saint Antonin, which was incorporated with the Diocese of Montauban; (2) the ancient Diocese of Vabres; and (3) a few scattered communes of the Diocese of Cahors.

It was a suffragan diocese of the Archdiocese of Bourges until 1676, then of the Archdiocese of Albi, until 2002, when the diocese became a suffragan in the ecclesiastical province of the metropolitan Archdiocese of Toulouse.

In 2022, in the Diocese of Rodez there was one priest for every 3,109 Catholics.

== Foundation ==
Modern tradition attributes to St. Martial the foundation of the church of Rodez and the sanctuary of the Blessed Virgin at Ceignac, for according to Cardinal Bourret, the church of Rodez honoured St. Martial as early as the sixth century. There were evidently bishops of Rodez before 475, since Sidonius Apollinaris, in a letter of AD 475, mentions that the Goths left it at that date without bishops.

== Middle Ages ==
=== Vabres ===
The Benedictine Abbey of Vabres, founded in 862 by Raymond I, Count of Toulouse. In 1061 or 1062 the abbey was in such a state of decay both in personnel and good order that its abbot, Deusdedit, arranged for it to submit itself to the control of the Abbey of S. Victor in Marseille; the abbot may have been encouraged or ordered by Pope Nicholas II to do so. The abbey and its territory was raised to episcopal rank in 1317, and its diocesan territory was taken from the southeastern portion of the Diocese of Rodez.

Some scholars hold that within the limits of the modern Diocese of Rodez there existed in Merovingian times the See of Arisitum which, according to Louis Duchesne, was in the neighbourhood of Alais.

=== Conques ===
The Diocese of Rodez is famous also through the Abbey of Conques and the cult of Saint Faith (Sainte Foy). Some Christians, flying from the Saracens about 730, sought a refuge in the "Val Rocheux" of the Dourdou and built an oratory there. In 790 the hermit Dadon made this his abode and aided by Louis the Pious, then King of Aquitaine, founded an abbey, which Louis named Conques. In 838 Pepin, King of Aquitaine, gave the monastery of Figeac to Conques. Between 877 and 883 the monks carried off the body of the youthful martyr Faith or Foy from the monastery of Sainte Foy to Conques, where it became the object of a great pilgrimage.

Abbot Odolric built the abbey church between 1030 and 1060; on the stonework over the doorway is carved the most artistic representation in France of the Last Judgment. Abbot Begon (1099–1118) enriched Conques with a superb reliquary of beaten gold and cloisonne's enamels of a kind extremely rare in France. Pope Paschal II gave him permission for the name of Sainte-Foy to be inserted in the Canon of the Mass after the names of the Roman virgins. At this time Conques, with Agen and Schelestadt in Alsace, was the centre of the cult of Saint Faith which soon spread to England, Spain, and America. The statue of St. Faith seated, which dates from the tenth century, was originally a small wooden one covered with gold leaf. In time, gems, enamels, and precious stones were added in such quantities that it is a living treatise on the history of the goldsmiths' art in France between the eleventh and sixteenth centuries. It was known during the Middle Ages as the "Majesté de Sainte Foy". The shrine enclosing the relics of the saint, which in 1590 was hidden in the masonry connecting the pillars of the choir of the abbey church, was rediscovered in 1875, repaired, transferred to the cathedral of Rodez for a novena, and brought back to Conques, a distance of 40 km, on the shoulders of the clergy.

=== Other monastic foundations ===
The Cistercian Abbeys of Silbanès, Beaulieu, Loc-Dieu, Bonneval, and Bonnecombe were model-farms during the Middle Ages. Attacked by brigands in the Rouergue country on his way to Santiago di Compostella, Adalard, Viscount of Flanders, erected in 1031 a monastery known as the Domerie d'Aubrac, a special order of priests, knights, lay brothers, ladies, and lay sisters for the care and protection of travellers. At Milhau, Rodez, Nazac, and Bozouls, hospitals, styled "Commanderies", of this order of Aubrac adopted the rule of St. Augustine in 1162.

The Franciscans had four houses, at Rodez, Villefranche, Millau, and Saint-Antonin. The Carmelites had two houses, at Millau, and Saint-Antonin. The Benedictines had two houses, at Sévérac-le-Chateau and at Rieupayroux. The Carthusians had two houses, at Rodez and at Villefranche. The Capuchins had four houses, at Rodez, Villefranche, Millau, and Saint-Antonin. There were Augustinian Canons at Villefranche and Saint-Geniès-d'Olt.

=== Town of Rodez ===
During the Middle Ages the Bishop of Rodez held temporal dominion over that portion of the town known as the Cité while in the eleventh century the Bourg became the County of Rodez. Until the expulsion of the English, the Rouergue was subject to the ducs de Guyenne, who were kings of England. In 1770 the Bishop was the Count of Rodez, and was possessed of high, middle and low justice. In 1770 the town itself had a population of around 5,000 persons, and was divided into two parishes, Saint-Amans (with 2,800 inhabitants) and Saint Martin-des-Près, in addition to the Cathedral parish. The cathedral of Rodez (thirteenth and fourteenth centuries) is a beautiful Gothic building, famous for its belfry (1510–26) and unique rood-beam. The design of the façade is attributed to Guillaume Philandrier, who had been secretary of Bishop Georges d'Armagnac, and who had been given a Canonry in the cathedral. It was spared during the Revolution for dedication to Marat. In 1772 the Cathedral Chapter was composed of twenty-five Canons, including 4 Archdeacons (Rodez, Millau, Saint-Antonin and Conques), a Sacristan, a Master of the Works, and the Precentor. There were twenty-five choral vicars, 4 hebdomidaires, a sub-cantor, and twenty-five choristers. The primary education of young children in the town was in the hands of four members of the Brothers of Christian Doctrine.

There were also eleven collegiate churches in the diocese, each with Canons:

- Villefranche (a Provost, Sacristan, ten canons).
- Saint-Foy de Conques (twenty canons, including the Abbot commendatory, Provost, Dean, Sacristan, Precentor, Treasurer, and Primicier).
- Saint-Christophe (Prior and eleven Canons).
- Varen (Dean, Sacristan, eight canons, two prebendaries).
- Mur-de-Barrès (Dean, Sacristan, ten canons, two hebdomidaires, and ten prebendaries).
- Salles-Curan (six canons and two clerics), founded by Bishop Delatour.
- Saint-Léons (Prior and ten canons).
- Lapanouse (five priests named by the Archdeacon of Rodez).
- Saint-Laurent-d'Olt (seven members).
- Saint-Antonin (twelve canons-regular and twelve secular prebendaries).
- Aubrac (twelve to fourteen canons-regular).

== Early modern period ==
The town of Millau (Milhau or Milhaud) adopted Calvinism in 1534, and in 1573 and 1620 was the scene of two large assemblies of Protestant deputies. It was at Millau in the summer of 1574 that Henri, Prince of Condé (1552–1588) was elected 'Protector' of the Calvinist community in France (chef et gouverneur général des églises de France), beginning the Fifth War of Religion. There was, for a time, a Protestant college in Millau. In 1629 Milhau and Saint-Afrique, another Protestant stronghold, were taken and dismantled by order of Louis XIII.

In 1628 a plague at Villefranche carried off 8000 inhabitants within six months; Father Ambroise, a Franciscan, and the chief of police Jean de Pomayrol saved the lives of many little children by causing them to bo suckled by goats.

In 1772, at the end of the Ancien Regime, the Diocese of Rodez had about 275,500 inhabitants. It was composed of 475 parishes and 66 annexes (churches maintained for the convenience of parishioners who lived too far from the parish church); they were divided into 48 districts, each with a Vicar Forane (supervisory priest) who was generally resident in the principal village of his district.

== Bishops of Rodez ==
=== to 1200 ===
- Martialis
- Amantius of Rodez
- Eustachius
- Quintian of Rodez (Quintianus)
- Dalmatius of Rodez : (524–580)
- Theodosius : (died 583 or 584)
- Innocentius
- Deusdedit
- Verus : (attested 614, 627)
- Aredius

Sede vacante

- Faraldus : (attested in 838)
- Elissachar : (attested in 862)
- Aymar (Adhemar)
- Frotardus (attested 887)
- Gausbertus
- Deusdedit : (922)
- Georgius (Jorius)
- Adhemar (Hacmar)
- Mengafrid (Manfroi) : (attested in 942)
- Stephanus (attested in 946, 964, 966)
- Deodatus : (attested in 961, 974 and 1004)
- Begon : ( ? )
- Arnaldus : (attested 1028, 1030)
- Geraldus (Geraud) : (attested in 1034, 1037)
- Peter Berenger of Narbonne (before 1053 – 1079)
- Pontius Stephani : (1079 – after 1082)
- Raymond de Frotard : (attested in 1095)
- Adhemar : (died between 1138 and 1144)
- N. : (ruled 3 years; deposed by Pope Eugene III
- Pierre : (attested 1146 to 1164)
- Hugues de Rodez : (ca 1162 – 1214)

=== from 1200 to 1600 ===
- Pierre de Treille : (1 July 1211 – ?)
- B.
- A.
- Berengarius Centulli : (12 December 1246 – ? )
- Vivianus : (by 15 March 1247 – 1274)
- Raymond de Calomonte : (23 October 1274 – c. 1298)
- Bernardus de Monastier : (1298–1299)
- Gasto de Cornet (Cornon) : (1300–1301)
- Petrus Pleine-Chassagne : (1302–1318)
- Petrus de Castelnau : (1318–1336)
- Bernardus d'Albi : (1336–1338)
- Girbertus de Cantabrio : (27 January 1339 – 1348/1349)
- Raymond d'Aigrefeuille : (17 June 1349 – 1361)
- Faydite d'Aigrefeuille : (2 August 1361 – 18 July 1371)
- Jean de Cardillac : (18 July 1371 – ) Administrator
- Bertrand Raffin : (24 January 1379 – 1385) (Avignon Obedience)
- Henri de Senery (Senry) : (18 May 1385 – 1397) (Avignon Obedience)
- Guillaume d'Ortolan: (25 May 1397 – 1417) (Appointed by Benedict XIII)
- Vitalis de Mauléon : (31 December 1417 – 1429) (Appointed by Benedict XIII)
- Guillaume de la Tour : (16 March 1429 – )
- Bertrand de Chalançon : (22 April 1457 – 1494)
- Bertrand de Polignac : (2 June 1494 – 2 November 1501).
- Charles de Tournon : 1501 – 1504)
- François d'Estaing (de Stagno) : (21 October 1504 – 1 November 1529)
- Georges d'Armagnac : (1529 Appointed – 1536):
- Jacques de Corneillan : (27 June 1561 – 1580)
- François de Corneillan : (12 October 1580 – 1605)

=== from 1600 ===
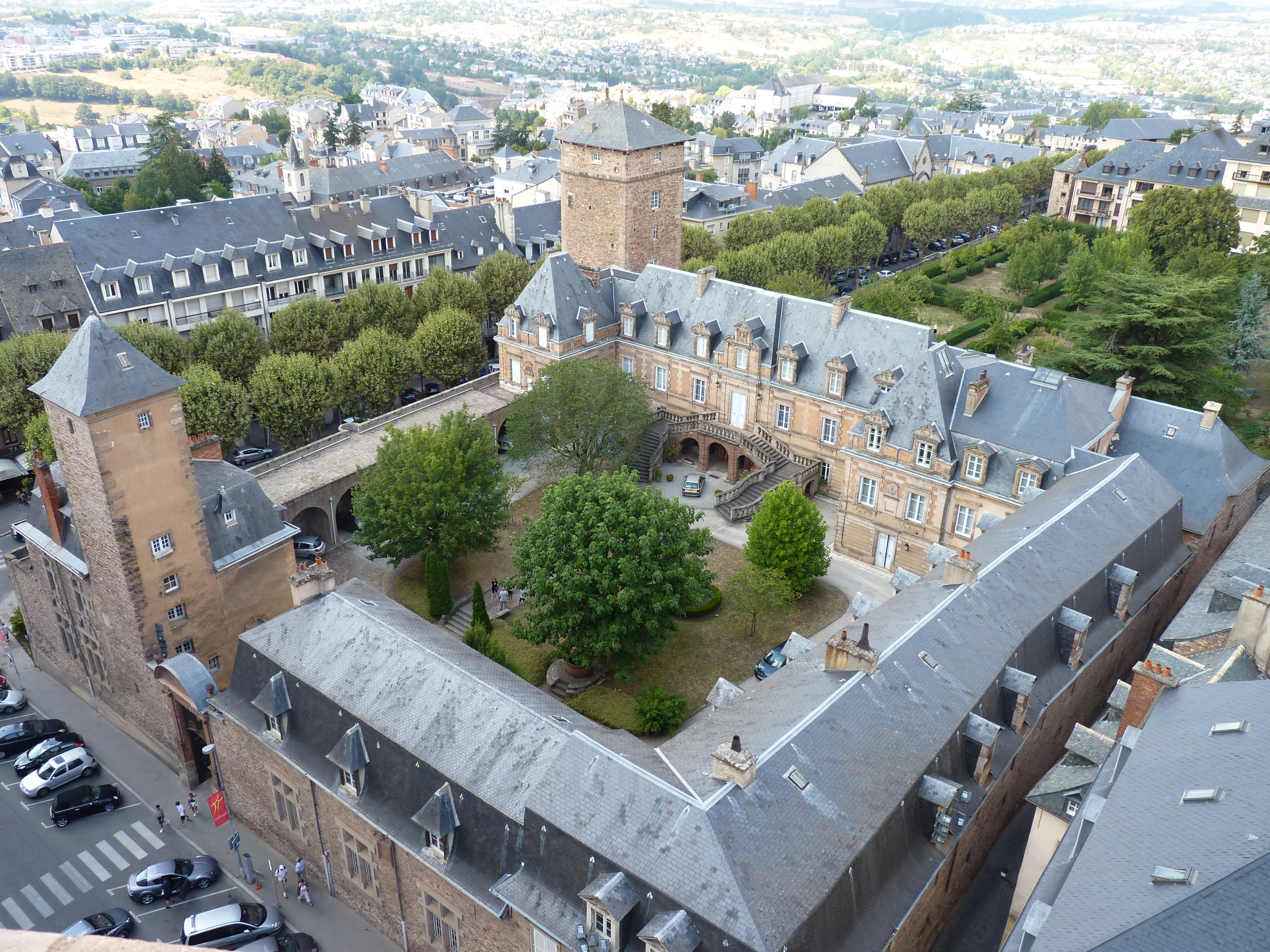
Episcopal Palace at Rodez (North wing: 1684–1694)

- Bernardin de Corneillan : (9 August 1605 – 1647)
- Hardouin de Péréfixe de Beaumont : (22 Apr 1648 Appointed – 30 Jul 1662) (Appointed Archbishop of Paris)
- Louis Abelly : (9 June 1664 – 1666)
- Gabriel de Voyer de Paulmy d'Argenson : (1666 Appointed – 11 Oct 1682 Died)
- Paul-Louis-Philippe de Lézay de Lusignan : (1684 – 25 Feb 1716 Died)
- Jean Armand de la Voue de Tourouvre : (8 June 1718 – 18 September 1733)

...

- Jean d'Yse (d'Ize) de Saléon : (11 April 1736 – 19 December 1746)
- Charles de Grimaldi d'Antibes : (19 December 1746 – 10 Mar 1770 Died)
- Jérôme-Marie Champion de Cicé : (6 August 1770 – 30 March 1781)
- Seignelay Colbert de Castle Hill : (2 Apr 1781 – 1801 refused the concordat of 1801) and https://colbertdecastlehill.com/)

...
Claude Debertier (1791–1801) (Constitutional Bishop of Averyon)

- Charles-André-Toussaint-Bruno de Ramond-Lalande : (8 Aug 1817 Appointed – 9 Jan 1830 Appointed, Archbishop of Sens)
- Pierre Giraud (9 Jan 1830 Appointed – 2 Dec 1841) (Appointed Archbishop of Cambrai)
- Jean-François Crozier (22 Feb 1842 Appointed – 2 Apr 1855 Died)
- Louis-Auguste Delalle (30 Aug 1855 Appointed – 6 Jun 1871 Died)
- Joseph-Christian-Ernest Bourret, C.O. : (19 Jul 1871 Appointed – 10 Jul 1896 Died)
- Jean-Augustin Germain (14 Apr 1897 Appointed – 7 Dec 1899 Appointed, Archbishop of Toulouse)
- Louis-Eugène Francqueville (7 Dec 1899 Appointed – 9 Dec 1905 Died)
- Charles du Pont de Ligonnès (21 Feb 1906 Appointed – 5 Feb 1925 Died)
- Charles Challiol (15 May 1925 Appointed – 11 Mar 1948 Died)
- Marcel-Marie-Henri-Paul Dubois (8 Jul 1948 Appointed – 10 Jun 1954 Appointed, Archbishop of Besançon)
- Jean-Ernest Ménard (23 Jan 1955 Appointed – 28 Jun 1973 Died)
- Roger Joseph Bourrat (30 May 1974 Appointed – 1 Jun 1991 Resigned)
- Bellino Giusto Ghirard (1 Jun 1991 Appointed – 2 April 2011 Retired)
- François Fonlupt (2 April 2011 Appointed – 11 June 2021 Appointed, Archbishop of Avignon)
- Luc Meyer (7 July 2022 Appointed – Present)

== Saints ==
Among Saints specially honoured in the Diocese of Rodez and Vabres are:

- Tarsicia, daughter of Ansbert of Moselle and Blithides of France, granddaughter of Chlothar I and of Radegunda, who retired to the Rouergue to lead an ascetic life (sixth century);
- Africanus, wrongly styled Bishop of Comminges, who died in the Rouergue (sixth century);
- Hilarian, martyred by the Moors in the time of Charlemagne (eighth and ninth century);
- Guasbert, founder and first abbot of the monastery of Montsalvy in the modern Diocese of St. Flour (eleventh century).

The chief shrines of the diocese are: Notre Dame de Ceignac, an ancient shrine rebuilt and enlarged in 1455, which over 15,000 pilgrims visited annually before World War I; Notre Dame du Saint Voile at Coupiac, another ancient shrine; Notre Dame des Treize Pierres at Villefranche, a pilgrimage site dating from 1509.

== Natives ==
Among natives of the diocese are:

- Dieudonné de Gozon (d. 1353) and Jean Parisot de Valette (1494–1568), Grand Masters of the order of St. John of Jerusalem; famous for their defence of Malta.
- Frassinous (1765–1841), preacher and minister of worship under the Restoration.
- Pierre Laromiguière (1736–1837), philosopher.
- Denis Auguste Affre (1793–1848), born at Saint-Rome-de-Tarn and, while Archbishop of Paris, accidentally shot at the Barricades in 1848, despite clear warnings of the danger.

== Sources ==
=== Reference works ===
- Gams, Pius Bonifatius (1873). Series episcoporum Ecclesiae catholicae: quotquot innotuerunt a beato Petro apostolo. Ratisbon: Typis et Sumptibus Georgii Josephi Manz. (Use with caution; obsolete)
- Eubel, Conradus, ed. (1913). Hierarchia catholica, Tomus 1 (second ed.). Münster: Libreria Regensbergiana. (in Latin)
- Eubel, Conradus, ed. (1914). Hierarchia catholica, Tomus 2 (second ed.). Münster: Libreria Regensbergiana. (in Latin)
- Gulik, Guilelmus (1923). Eubel, Conradus (ed.). Hierarchia catholica, Tomus 3 (second ed.). Münster: Libreria Regensbergiana.
- Gauchat, Patritius (Patrice) (1935). Hierarchia catholica IV (1592-1667). Münster: Libraria Regensbergiana.
- Ritzler, Remigius; Sefrin, Pirminus (1952). Hierarchia catholica medii et recentis aevi V (1667-1730). Patavii: Messagero di S. Antonio.
- Ritzler, Remigius; Sefrin, Pirminus (1958). Hierarchia catholica medii et recentis aevi VI (1730-1799). Patavii: Messagero di S. Antonio.
- Ritzler, Remigius; Sefrin, Pirminus (1968). Hierarchia Catholica medii et recentioris aevi sive summorum pontificum, S. R. E. cardinalium, ecclesiarum antistitum series... A pontificatu Pii PP. VII (1800) usque ad pontificatum Gregorii PP. XVI (1846) (in Latin). Vol. VII. Monasterii: Libr. Regensburgiana.
- Remigius Ritzler; Pirminus Sefrin (1978). Hierarchia catholica Medii et recentioris aevi... A Pontificatu PII PP. IX (1846) usque ad Pontificatum Leonis PP. XIII (1903) (in Latin). Vol. VIII. Il Messaggero di S. Antonio.
- Pięta, Zenon (2002). Hierarchia catholica medii et recentioris aevi... A pontificatu Pii PP. X (1903) usque ad pontificatum Benedictii PP. XV (1922) (in Latin). Vol. IX. Padua: Messagero di San Antonio. ISBN 978-88-250-1000-8.
- Saint-Marthe, Denis de (1715). Gallia christiana: in provincias ecclesiasticas distributa (in Latin). Vol. Tomus primus (nova ed.). Paris: J.-B. Coignard. pp. 195–274, Instrumenta, pp. 49–55, 203.

=== Studies ===
- Bion de Marlavagne, Louis (1875). Histoire de la Cathédrale de Rodez: avec pièces justificatives et de nombreux documents sur les églises et les anciens artistes du Rouergue (in French). Paris: Didron.
- Bosc, L. Charles Paul (1905). Mémoires pour servir à l'histoire du Rouergue (in French) (troisieme ed.). Rodez: E. Carrère. pp. 259–311. [notes on bishops]
- Calmet, P. (1897). "L'abbaye de Vabres et son erection en évêché," in: Annales de Saint-Louis-des-Français (in French). Rome: St. Louis-des-Français. 1897. pp. 487–539.
- Desachy, Matthieu (1997). "Tables et «pointes» de la cathédrale de Rodez (XIVe–XVIe siècle)," Bibliothèque de l'École des chartes (in French). Vol. Tome 155. Paris: Librairie Droz. 1997. pp. 575–606. ISBN 9782600002387.
- Desachy, Matthieu (ed.) (2002): Fasti Ecclesiae Gallicanae. Répertoire prosopographique des évêques, dignitaires et chanoines des diocèses de France de 1200 à 1500. VI. Diocèse de Rodez. Turnhout, Brepols. (in French)
- Desachy, Matthieu (2005). Cité des hommes: le chapitre cathédral de Rodez, 1215-1562 (in French). Rodez: Rouergue. ISBN 9782841566655.
- Desjardins, Gustave (1863). "Éveques de Rodez au IXe, au Xe, et au XIIe siècle, supplément au catalogue publié dans la Gallia christiana". Bibliothèque de l'École des Chartes. 4: 145–171. JSTOR 42998531.
- Desjardins, Gustave (1879). Cartulaire de l'abbaye de Conques en Rouergue. Paris: Alphonse Picard. (in French, Latin)
- Duchesne, Louis (1910). Fastes épiscopaux de l'ancienne Gaule: II. L'Aquitaine et les Lyonnaises. Paris: Fontemoing. pp. 39–41.
- Lempereur, Louis (1906). Etat du Diocèse de Rodez en 1771 (in French). Rodez: Louis Loup.
- Lourdou, Magali (2003). "Les protestants et le consulat millavois au temps des premières guerres de religion (vers 1560 – vers 1574)," Revue du Rouergue. 2003 (73) : pp. 49–66.
- Maisonabe, Noël, "[Jean Sicard], Ruthena Christiana, sive series et historia Episcoporum Ruthenensium" in Mémoires de la Société des lettres, sciences et arts de l' Avyron, XIV (Rodez, 1893), 331–447. (in Latin)
- Servières, Louis (1874). Histoire de l'église du Rouergue (in French). Rodez: Vve E. Carrère.
- Servières, L.; A. Bouillet (1901). Sainte Foy, vierge et martyre à Agen (in French). Impr. moderne.
- Touzery, J. (1906) Les bénéfices de Rodez avant la Revolution de 1789, état dressé par l'Abbé de Grimaldi, publié et annoté par M. le Chanoine J. Touzery. Rodez, Imprimerie catholique 1906.
- Bourret, J.-C.-E. (1902). Documents sur les origines chrétiennes de Rouergue. Saint Martial. (Rodez, 1902).
- Servières, Louis (1872). Les Saints du Rouergue (Rodez, 1872).
- Bocsquet, Tableau chronologique et biographiqu des cardinaux, archevéques et évêques originaires du Rouergue (Rodez, 1850).

==== Acknowledgment ====
(written by Georges Goyau)
