= Titipiti River =

- Watershed of Nottaway River

Location
- Country: Canada
- Province: Quebec
- Region: Nord-du-Québec

Physical characteristics
- Source: Valcourt Lake
  - location: Lac-Ashuapmushuan, Quebec (unorganized territory), Saguenay-Lac-Saint-Jean, Quebec
  - coordinates: 48°59′01″N 74°18′17″W
  - elevation: 447 m (1,467 ft)
- Mouth: Robert Lake (Opawica River)
  - location: Eeyou Istchee James Bay (municipality), Nord-du-Québec, Quebec
  - coordinates: 49°09′28″N 74°18′30″W
  - elevation: 392 m (1,286 ft)
- Length: 28.6 km (17.8 mi)

Basin features
- Tributaries
  - left: (upstreams) Outlet of lakes Karl and De l’Étang, outlet of lakes Bornais and Des Rats.
  - right: Outlet of lake Gadou, outlet of lakes Arre and Hermin.

The Titipiti River is a tributary of Feuquières Lake, in Quebec, in Canada. This watercourse crosses the administrative regions of:

- Saguenay-Lac-Saint-Jean: in the unorganized territory Lac-Ashuapmushuan, Quebec, in the Le Domaine-du-Roy Regional County Municipality (RCM);
- Nord-du-Québec: in the municipality of Eeyou Istchee Baie-James (municipality), in Jamésie.

This river crosses successively the cantons of Ventadour and Feuquières. Forestry is the main economic activity of the sector; recreational tourism activities, second. A logging camp has been established on the west bank of Ventadour Lake near a forest road.

The southern part of the Titipiti River Valley is served by route 212 which connects Obedjiwan to La Tuque and passes south of Lake Dubois. From there, the forest road R1032 (North-South direction) passes on the west side of the Ventadour River. The forest road R0212 (East-West direction) near the head lake of Titipiti River.

The surface of the Titipiti River is usually frozen from early November to mid-May, however, safe ice movement is generally from mid-November to mid-April.

== Geography ==
The surrounding hydrographic slopes of the Titipiti River are:
- north side: Feuquières Lake, Robert Lake, Gabriel Lake (Opawica River tributary), Rohault Lake, Opawica River;
- east side: Normandin River, Marquette River West, Poutrincourt Lake, Ashuapmushuan River;
- south side: Normandin Lake, Townsend Creek, Gouin Reservoir, Wapous River, Magnan Lake;
- west side: Ventadour River, Pokotciminike River, Toussaint River.

The Titipiti River originates at the mouth of a Valcourt Lake (length: 0.8 kilometres (0.50 mi), altitude: 447 metres (1,467 ft)) in the Township of Ventadour, in Lac-Ashuapmushuan, Quebec (unorganized territory). Valcourt Lake and "Petit Lac Valcourt" are the only bodies of water on the Nottaway River outside Eeyou Istchee Baie-James (municipality).

The mouth of Valcourt Lake is located in Chibougamau Park at 1.2 kilometres (0.75 mi) east of the Eeyou Istchee James Bay (municipality) boundary and Le Domaine-du-Roy Regional County Municipality. Lake Valcourt is located at the foot (east side) of a mountain whose summit reaches 550 metres (1,800 ft).

Lake Valcourt is located at 1.8 kilometres (1.1 mi) northwest of Normandin Lake which is the head lake of the Normandin River, a tributary of the Ashuapmushuan River which in turn flows to the west shore of Lac Saint-Jean.

The mouth of Lake Valcourt is located at:

- 19.7 kilometres (12.2 mi) South of the mouth of the Titipiti River (confluence with Feuquières Lake);
- 42.0 kilometres (26.1 mi) southeast of the mouth of Gabriel Lake (Opawica River tributary);
- 64.0 kilometres (39.8 mi) south-east of the mouth of Caopatina Lake;
- 143.7 kilometres (89.3 mi) south-east of the confluence of the Opawica River and Chibougamau River, the head of the Waswanipi River;
- 406.4 kilometres (252.5 mi) southeasterly of the mouth of the Nottaway River (confluence with James Bay);
- 103.9 kilometres (64.6 mi) south-east of downtown Chibougamau;
- 25.0 kilometres (15.5 mi) north-east of Gouin Reservoir.

From the mouth of the head lake, the Titipiti River flows over 28.6 kilometres (17.8 mi) according to the following segments:

- 1.6 kilometres (0.99 mi) to the northwest in the canton of Ventadour, crossing the Petit lac Valcourt, until the discharge (coming from the North-East) of the lakes Arre and Hermin, which corresponds to the Eastern limit of the administrative region of Nord-du-Québec;
- 1.0 kilometre (0.62 mi) towards the west, until the discharge (coming from the south) of the Bornais lakes and the Rats;
- 1.6 kilometres (0.99 mi) to the northwest, crossing the Vison Lake (length: 0.8 kilometres (0.50 mi); altitude: 416 metres (1,365 ft)) that the current crosses on its full length, up to the bridge of a forest road;
- 9.0 kilometres (5.6 mi) north, to the limit of the township of Feuquières;
- 15.4 kilometres (9.6 mi) to the north winding through wetlands at the end of the segment to its mouth.

The Titipiti River flows to the bottom of a bay on the south shore of Feuquières Lake which the current flows northward on 16.2 kilometres (10.1 mi) including 7.9 kilometres (4.9 mi) crossing the western part of the lake. Note: the two parts of the lake are separated by a strait of 0.9 kilometres (0.56 mi). Then, the current flows westward on 1.4 kilometres (0.87 mi) to reach the east shore of Robert Lake which the current crosses West on 5.8 kilometres (3.6 mi) to its mouth. After crossing a final stretch of river of 2.1 kilometres (1.3 mi) across the Dead Lake, the current flows into a bay on the east shore of Gabriel Lake (Opawica River tributary) that current crosses northwest on 14.1 kilometres (8.8 mi) to take the Opawica River.

The latter, in turn, generally goes northwest, then west, then north, to its confluence with the Chibougamau River; this confluence is the source of the Waswanipi River. The course of the latter flows west and crosses successively the northern part of the Lake Waswanipi, Goéland Lake and Olga Lake (Waswanipi River), before discharging into Matagami Lake which is in turn flows into the Nottaway River, a tributary of Rupert Bay (James Bay).

The confluence of the Titipiti River with the Feuquières Lake is located at:

- 9.2 kilometres (5.7 mi) south-east of the mouth of Feuquières Lake;
- 13.3 kilometres (8.3 mi) south of the mouth of Robert Lake (Opawica River);
- 24.7 kilometres (15.3 mi) south-east of the mouth of Gabriel Lake (Opawica River tributary);
- 133.7 kilometres (83.1 mi) south-east of the mouth of the Opawica River (confluence with the Chibougamau River);
- 84.4 kilometres (52.4 mi) south-east of downtown Chibougamau;
- 78.9 kilometres (49.0 mi) south-east of the village center of Chapais, Quebec;
- 41.4 kilometres (25.7 mi) north of a bay on the north shore of Gouin Reservoir.

== Toponymy ==
At various times in history, this territory has been occupied by the Attikameks, the Algonquin and the Cree.

The toponym "Titipiti River" was officialized on December 5, 1968, at the Commission de toponymie du Québec, when it was created.

== See also ==
- James Bay
- Rupert Bay
- Nottaway River, a watercourse
- Matagami Lake, a body of water
- Waswanipi River, a watercourse
- Opawica River, a watercourse
- Gabriel Lake (Opawica River tributary), a body of water
- Feuquières Lake, a body of water
- Robert Lake (Opawica River), a body of water
- Eeyou Istchee James Bay (municipality)
- Lac-Ashuapmushuan, Quebec, an unorganized territory
- List of rivers of Quebec
