= Ventadour River =

Ventadour Old name: “Lynxeye River”
- Watershed of Nottaway River

Location
- Country: Canada
- Province: Quebec
- Region: Nord-du-Québec

Physical characteristics
- Source: Georges Lake
  - location: Eeyou Istchee James Bay (municipality), Nord-du-Québec, Quebec
  - coordinates: 48°56′15″N 74°20′30″W
  - elevation: 433 m (1,421 ft)
- Mouth: Robert Lake
  - location: Eeyou Istchee James Bay (municipality), Nord-du-Québec, Quebec
  - coordinates: 49°09′37″N 74°22′22″W
  - elevation: 392 m (1,286 ft)
- Length: 33.5 km (20.8 mi)

Basin features
- Tributaries
  - left: (upstreams): Outlet of lakes Stan and Pole; outlet of Lake Simone; outlet of Lake Émery (via Lake Ventadour); outlet of Lake Toutou; outlet of Lake Du Lion (via Lake Nairn); outlet of Lake Geaty.
  - right: Outlet of lakes Sauvé and Léo.

The Ventadour River is a tributary of the south shore of Robert Lake flowing into Eeyou Istchee Baie-James (municipality), in Jamésie, in the administrative region of Nord-du-Québec, Quebec, Canada.

This river crosses successively the cantons of Ventadour and Feuquières. Forestry is the main economic activity of the sector; recreational tourism activities, second. A logging camp has been established on the west bank of Lake Ventadour near a forest road.

The south of the Ventadour River Valley is served by route 212 which connects Obedjiwan to La Tuque and passes south of Lac Dubois. From there, the forest road R1032 (North–south direction) passes on the west side of the Ventadour River.

The surface of the Ventadour River is usually frozen from early November to mid-May, however, safe ice circulation is generally from mid-November to mid-April.

== Geography ==
The surrounding hydrographic slopes of the Ventadour River are:
- north side: Robert Lake, Gabriel Lake (Opawica River tributary), Rohault Lake, Opawica River;
- east side: Titipiti River, Normandin River, Marquette River West, Poutrincourt Lake, Ashuapmushuan River;
- south side: Gouin Reservoir, Wapous River, Magnan Lake;
- west side: Pokotciminikew River, Toussaint River.

The Ventadour River originates at the mouth of a Georges Lake (length: 0.7 kilometres (0.43 mi), altitude: 433 metres (1,421 ft)) in the Ventadour Township. The mouth of this lake is located in the Haute-Mauricie Park at 0.8 kilometres (0.50 mi) west of the Eeyou Istchee James Bay (municipality) boundary and the regional county municipality (MRC) Le Domaine-du-Roy. Lake George and its neighbor to the west, Lion Lake, are the two most southerly lakes of Eeyou Istchee James Bay (municipality). Lake Georges is located at 3.3 kilometres (2.1 mi) south-west of Normandin Lake which is the head lake of the Normandin River, a tributary of the Ashuapmushuan River which in turn flows to the shore West of Lac Saint-Jean.

The mouth of Lake George is located at:

- 26.4 kilometres (16.4 mi) south of the mouth of the Ventadour River (confluence with Robert Lake (Opawica River tributary));
- 47.2 kilometres (29.3 mi) south-east of the mouth of Gabriel Lake (Opawica River tributary);
- 68.2 kilometres (42.4 mi) south-east of the mouth of Caopatina Lake;
- 145.6 kilometres (90.5 mi) south-east of the confluence of the Opawica River and Chibougamau River, the head of the Waswanipi River;
- 418 kilometres (260 mi) southeasterly of the mouth of the Nottaway River (confluence with James Bay);
- 113.1 kilometres (70.3 mi) south-east of downtown Chibougamau;
- 26.7 kilometres (16.6 mi) north-east of Gouin Reservoir.

From the mouth of the head lake, the Ventadour River flows over 33.5 kilometres (20.8 mi) according to the following segments:

- 2.2 kilometres (1.4 mi) North in the Township of Ventadour to the mouth of Quinn Lake (Length: 1.2 kilometres (0.75 mi); altitude: 427 metres (1,401 ft)) that the current flows through its full length;
- 0.9 kilometres (0.56 mi) westerly to the Geaty Lake discharge (from the south);
- 2.4 kilometres (1.5 mi) north, crossing Nairn Lake (length: 3.3 kilometres (2.1 mi); altitude: 418 metres (1,371 ft)), to the mouth of the last, where a road bridge is laid out;
- 1.3 kilometres (0.81 mi) north, to a second road bridge;
- 16.6 kilometres (10.3 mi) to the north, crossing Lake Ventadour (altitude: 424 metres (1,391 ft)) on its full length when entering the canton of Feuquières for the last 2.6 kilometres (1.6 mi) from the northern part of the lake;
- 10.1 kilometres (6.3 mi) north to mouth.

The Ventadour River flows into a bay on the south shore of Boucher Lake (Opawica River). From there, the current flows through this lake, which flows to the east shore of Gabriel Lake (Opawica River tributary). The latter, in turn, generally goes northwest, then west, then north, to its confluence with the Chibougamau River; this confluence is the source of the Waswanipi River. The course of the latter flows westward and crosses successively the northern part of Lake Waswanipi, the Goéland Lake and the Olga Lake (Waswanipi River), before discharging into Matagami Lake which in turn flows into the Nottaway River, a tributary of Rupert Bay (James Bay).

The confluence of the Ventadour River with Robert Lake is located at:

- 10.2 kilometres (6.3 mi) south of the mouth of Robert Lake;
- 21.1 kilometres (13.1 mi) south-east of the mouth of Gabriel Lake (Opawica River tributary);
- 17.1 kilometres (10.6 mi) south of a bay Rohault Lake;
- 135.6 kilometres (84.3 mi) south-east of the mouth of the Opawica River (confluence with the Chibougamau River);
- 85.1 kilometres (52.9 mi) South of downtown Chibougamau;
- 81.2 kilometres (50.5 mi) south-east of the village center of Chapais, Quebec;
- 41.1 kilometres (25.5 mi) north of a bay on the north shore of Gouin Reservoir.

== Toponymy ==
At various times in history, this territory has been occupied by the Attikameks, the Algonquin and the Cree.

The toponym "Ventadour River" was made official on December 5, 1968, at the Commission de toponymie du Québec, when it was created.

== See also ==
- James Bay
- Rupert Bay
- Nottaway River, a watercourse
- Matagami Lake, a body of water
- Waswanipi River, a watercourse
- Opawica River, a watercourse
- Gabriel Lake (Opawica River tributary), a body of water
- Robert Lake, a body of water
- Eeyou Istchee James Bay (Municipality)
- List of rivers of Quebec
